= Marichu Maceda =

Filipino film producer (1942–2020)

- Born: Maria Azucena Vera-Perez; December 23, 1942
- Died: September 7, 2020 (aged 77); Quezon City, Philippines
- Resting place: Manila Memorial Park – Sucat, Paranaque, Philippines
- Other name: Manay Ichu
- Occupation: Film producer
- Notable work: Dyesebel (1978); Batch '81 (1982)
- Spouse: Ernesto Maceda (m. 1962; died 2016)
- Children: 5 (including Edward)
- Parents: José Roxas Perez (father); Nene Vera (mother)
- Relatives: Gina de Venecia (sister); Jose O. Vera (grandfather); Dolores Honrado (grandmother); Christopher de Venecia (nephew)

Maria Azucena "Marichu" Vera-Perez Maceda (December 23, 1942 – September 7, 2020) was a Filipino film producer and executive. She was an active supporter of President Ferdinand Marcos throughout his 20-year administration, being friends with Imelda Marcos even after her husband Ernesto Maceda went into exile due to his opposition to the Marcoses' dictatorship. During the 1986 snap presidential election in 1986, Marichu Maceda was credited with recruiting several entertainment personalities for the "Stars for Marcos Movement" campaign.

== Early life ==
Maria Azucena Vera-Perez, was born on December 23, 1942 to Jose R. Perez and Azucena "Nene" Vera who owned and managed Sampaguita Pictures. Maria Azucena or Marichu, was the eldest of seven children.

== Career ==
Maceda was born to the Vera-Perez family who are known for owning Sampaguita Pictures, a major production company in the Philippines from the 1930s to the 1970s. Maceda, who would be affectionally known as "Manay Ichu" within the film industry, grew to be a film producer herself. She is known for producing the 1982 film Batch '81 directed by Mike de Leon and the 1978 film Dyesebel of Anthony Taylor. Working within and outside of Sampaguita, Maceda would also work as a writer and production designer. She would also setup MVP Pictures.

She also had a role in the establishment of various film organizations in the Philippines such as the Film Development Council of the Philippines (FDCP), Movie Workers Welfare Foundation, Metro Manila Film Festival, and the Film Academy of the Philippines. In the 1990s, she initiated a screenwriting contest sponsored by the Film Development Foundation, a precursor to the FDCP, with led to screenplays such as Lav Diaz's Serafin Geronimo and Michiko Yamamoto's Magnifico Magikero winning the contest and becoming feature-length films.

== Death ==
Maceda who had a lingering illness died on September 7, 2020, due to cardio respiratory failure at the age of 77. She died at a hospital in Quezon City.

== Legacy ==
The Manay Ichu Vera-Perez Maceda Memorial Award (also known as Marichu Maceda Achievement Award), awarded every Gabi ng Parangal (transl. Awards Night) of the Metro Manila Film Festival since 2022 to the significant contributors to the Philippine industry, is named after her.

== Personal life ==
Marichu Maceda was married to Ernesto Maceda, a former senator. They had five children. One of her children, Edward, is an incumbent representative from Manila's 4th district. Maceda's maternal grandfather, Jose O. Vera was also a senator.
