= Gina de Venecia =

Filipino politician (born 1949)

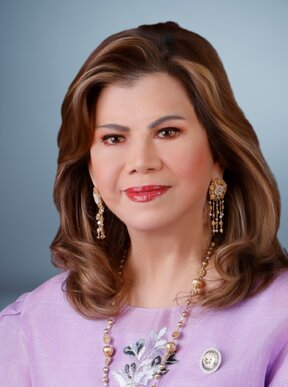
- Official portrait, 2025

Member of the Philippine House of Representatives from Pangasinan's 4th district
- Incumbent
- Assumed office June 30, 2025
- Preceded by: Christopher de Venecia
- In office June 30, 2010 – June 30, 2016
- Preceded by: Jose de Venecia Jr.
- Succeeded by: Christopher de Venecia

Personal details
- Born: Maria Georgina Vera Perez; February 15, 1949 (age 77) Manila, Philippines
- Party: Lakas (2024–present)
- Other political affiliations: NPC (2009–2024)
- Spouse(s): Felipe Cruz (separated); Jose de Venecia Jr. (d. 2026)
- Relations: Marichu Maceda (sister); Ernesto Maceda (brother-in-law); José O. Vera (grandfather); Dolores Honrado (grandmother); Edward Maceda (nephew)
- Children: 5, including Christopher
- Parent(s): José Roxas Perez; Nene Vera-Perez
- Education: Pace College; Assumption Convent
- Occupation: Public servant, politician, broadcaster

Maria Georgina Vera Perez-de Venecia (born February 15, 1949), also known as Manay Gina de Venecia, is a Filipino politician and former broadcaster. A member of the Vera-Perez family of film producers and politicians, she has served as a member of the Philippine House of Representatives for the 4th district of Pangasinan since 2025, previously holding the seat from 2010 to 2016. She was married to Jose de Venecia Jr., the five-time Speaker of the House of Representatives of the Philippines from 1992 to 1998 and 2001 to 2008.

== Early life and education ==
Gina Vera-Perez's father, José Roxas Perez, was the owner of film production company Sampaguita Pictures, while her mother, Azucena Vera-Perez of Catanduanes, served as the president of the company as well as Vera-Perez Pictures. Her grandfather, Senator José O. Vera, co-founded Sampaguita Pictures with his brother Pedro among others in what is now Quezon City.

She finished high school at the Assumption Convent and received a degree in Business Administration from Pace College, New York. Immediately after graduation, she served as Vice President and Comptroller of Sampaguita Pictures, VP Enterprises and Jose Vera Corporation.

In early 1967, a debut was organized for Perez's 18th birthday, which was held at her family's residence in New Manila, Quezon City and attended by President Ferdinand Marcos, First Lady Imelda Marcos, Vice President Fernando Lopez and his wife Maria Salvacion, Congressman Emmanuel Pelaez, and Presidential Assistant Ernesto Maceda (Perez's brother-in-law).

== Public service ==
In 1992, she became the president and chairperson of the Congressional Spouses Foundation, Inc. (CSFI). During her first two terms as CSFI president, she established The Haven for Women in Alabang. It was inaugurated on September 30, 1995, and immediately followed by the construction of the 15 regional centers nationwide.

On February 15, 1997, de Venecia also signed a Memorandum of Agreement with then Department of the Interior and Local Government Secretary Robert Barbers that prepared the setting-up of Women’s and Children’s Desk in every police station in the country.

In June 1996, she launched her radio program Pira-pirasong Pangarap. The following year, its television adaptation made its debut on GMA Network. After seven years, the program was re-launched as Nagmamahal, Manay Gina in the tri-media: DZBB, Balita and GMA Network. Her radio program won three Catholic Mass Media Awards, including Best Radio Drama. De Venecia also maintains advice columns in Balita and Tempo publications.

De Venecia served as chairperson of the 2002 Apolinario Mabini Awards that honored the achievements of the disabled; and the 2002 Aliw Awards that gave recognition to outstanding artists.

On January 15, 2004, she inaugurated another project for the CSFI, The Haven for Children in Muntinlupa, that rehabilitates street children ages six to 12. In 2006, she expanded this campaign to a national scale by finishing three regional centers for children in Dagupan City, Tarlac City, Prosperidad, Agusan del Sur and Solana, Cagayan.

On December 16, 2004, de Venecia established the INA (Inang Naulila sa Anak) Foundation. Its mission is to provide psycho–social support to grieving mothers who lost their child. INA Healing Center was opened on December 16, 2006, at the DSWD Compound, Batasan Hills, Quezon City.

In 2007, she started her third project as President of the CSFI, The Haven for the Elderly, a 20-building facility for senior citizens in Tanay, Rizal. It was opened on April 28, 2010.

At the same period, The Phase II of The Haven for Women was also constructed. From its original nine buildings, it has expanded as a 16-building facility with two livelihood centers, an inter-faith chapel, a gym, an administration office, several residential cottages, an air-conditioned nursery and a sick bay with dental and medical clinics.

=== Projects ===
- The Haven for Women with 15 regional centers.
- The Haven for Children with 4 regional centers.
- The Haven for the Elderly was started in 2007. This 20-building complex in Tanay, Rizal now operates as a refuge for senior citizens.
- Ina Healing Center is located at the DSWD Compound in Batasan Hills, Quezon City. This facility provides free psycho-social support to bereaved mothers who are orphaned by their child.

== Political career ==
In 2010, de Venecia was elected Congresswoman of the 4th District of Pangasinan, succeeding her husband Jose de Venecia Jr., who was term limited. On January 17, 2011, she was elected as President of the Association of Lady Legislators of the 15th Congress.

She was re-elected in 2013 through a landslide victory. She initially filed her bid for reelection ahead of the 2016 elections but later withdrew on December 8, 2015 and supported the candidacy of her son, Christopher, who eventually succeeded her. Gina regained the seat in 2025 after Christopher was term-limited.

== Distinctions ==
De Venecia has received an honorary doctorate degree in humanities from Mindanao State University (2001), Pangasinan State University (2007), Laguna State Polytechnic University (2007) and University of Luzon (2009). During the International Women's Day celebration on March 7, 2007, de Venecia was the recipient of the Outstanding Humanitarian Service Award from the International Centennial Feminist Association of the Philippines and the Rotary Club of Manila 101.

== Personal life ==
De Venecia was previously married to construction manager Felipe Cruz with whom she had 2 children. She later married Jose de Venecia Jr., who later became Speaker of the House of Representatives. They had two children, Christopher and Kristina Casimira (KC), who died in a house fire in 2004. Jose died in 2026.
