= Honrado =

Honrado is a Spanish surname. Notable people with the surname include:

- Azucena "Nene" Honrado Vera-Perez or Nene Vera-Perez, Filipino film producer
- Dolores Morato Honrado Vera or Dolores Vera, Filipino film studio executive
- Lara Honrado, Canadian politician
- Maria Sheilah Honrado Lacuna-Pangan (born 1965), Filipina physician and politician
