= Aymeric Sallin =

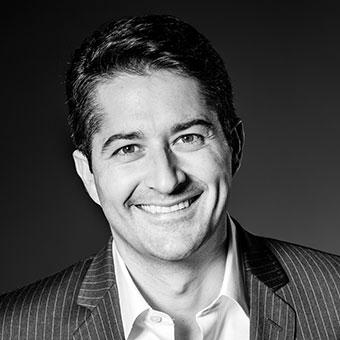
- Born: Fribourg, Switzerland
- Education: EPFL
- Occupations: Founder and CEO of NanoDimension

Aymeric Sallin is the founder and CEO of NanoDimension, a nanotechnology-focused venture and capital firm with offices in Silicon Valley and Switzerland.

== Early Career and Education ==
Prior to founding NanoDimension, Aymeric worked at Bain & Company.

He holds a Masters in Physical Engineering from the Swiss Federal Institute of Technology in Lausanne (EPFL).

Aymeric is native from Fribourg in Switzerland. He currently lives with his wife Kelly and three children in Woodside.

== Accolades ==
Since 2002, Sallin has actively promoted nanotechnology around the world, receiving the NSTI Fellow Award in 2007 and the 2012 EPFL Alumni Award for "his entrepreneurial spirit, his dedication and exceptional contribution to the field of nanotechnology". Sallin is an elected member of the World Economic Forum’s Young Global Leaders, Class of 2013 and regularly attends the World Economic Forum Annual Meeting in Davos, Switzerland. He was voted top 20 under 40 in Switzerland by Bilan Magazine and one of Switzerland’s 300 most influential people in 2011, 2012 and 2013. Since 2014, he has served as the Chairman of the Board of Alumni of EPFL as well as a member of the Strategic Advisory Board of EPFL. In May 2016, he was elected to the Swiss Academy of Engineering Sciences "for his outstanding entrepreneurship which has played a decisive role in the creation and subsequent development of extremely high-tech manufacturing companies".
