= Christopher de Venecia =

Filipino politician

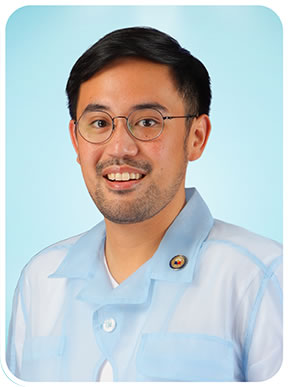
- Official portrait, 2022

Member of the Philippine House of Representatives from Pangasinan's 4th district
- In office June 30, 2016 – June 30, 2025
- Preceded by: Gina de Venecia
- Succeeded by: Gina de Venecia

Personal details
- Born: Christopher George Martin Perez de Venecia; October 27, 1986 (age 39) Los Angeles, California, U.S.
- Citizenship: United States (formerly); Philippines
- Party: Lakas (2017–present)
- Other political affiliations: Liberal (2015–2017)
- Parents: Jose de Venecia Jr. (father); Gina de Venecia (mother)
- Relatives: José Roxas Perez (grandfather); Nene Vera-Perez (grandmother); Jose de Venecia III (half-brother)
- Occupation: Politician, writer, theater director, theater producer

Christopher George Martin Perez de Venecia (born October 27, 1986), sometimes referred to as Toff de Venecia, is a Filipino former child actor, writer, director, theater producer, and politician who served as a member of the Philippine House of Representatives for the 4th district of Pangasinan from 2016 to 2025. He is the son of former House Speaker Jose de Venecia Jr. and Gina de Venecia.

== Education ==
De Venecia finished his elementary studies at the Colegio de San Agustin and his secondary education at the Ateneo de Manila High School. He earned a bachelor's degree in political science at the Ateneo de Manila University and completed courses in Public Leadership at the Harvard Kennedy School.

== Political career ==
=== Congressional stint ===
De Venecia ran for Representative of the Fourth District of Pangasinan in 2016. He ran under the platform B.A.G.E.T.S., which stands for Buhay na Turismo, Agrikultura, Gusali at Imprastraktura, Edukayson, Trabaho, at Serbisyong Pangkalusugan (lit. transl. Living Tourism, Agriculture, Buildings and Infrastructure, Education, Employment, and Health Services). He won that election. In the 2019 elections, he was overwhelmingly re-elected for a second term.

In the 18th Congress, he is sitting as a Deputy Majority Leader and also the Chairman of the Special Committee of Creative Industry and Performing Arts.

He was also the lead convener of the same Congress's Arts and Culture and Creative Industries Bloc, with 6 Deputy Speakers and 12 Committee Chairmen as members.

On July 10, 2020, he, along with his cousin Edward Maceda (Manila–4th), was one of the 11 representatives who voted to grant the franchise renewal of ABS-CBN. He is the only North Luzon Representative and the only Pangasinense to grant the franchise as opposed to Conrado Estrella III (Abono), who voted to reject the franchise renewal.

De Venecia was re-elected to his third term in 2022.

== Key Legislations ==
The following are the key legislation of de Venecia:

- Eddie Garcia Bill - An act seeking to institute policies for the protection and promotion of the welfare of workers or independent contractors in the film, television, and radio entertainment industry.
- Young Farmers and Fisherfolk Challenge Act - An act seeking to create a program to support and empower our young farmers and fisherfolk as partners in ensuring food security, agricultural development, and modernization.
- Manaoag Bill - An act declaring Manaoag, Pangasinan as a tourist destination.
- Philippine Space Development Act - An act seeking to strengthen and aid in the development of agriculture, disaster risk reduction, and telecommunications, apart from space exploration.
- SOGIE Equality Bill – An act seeking the nationwide protection of LGBT rights in the Philippines
- Department of Culture Bill – An act seeking the establishment of a Department of Culture from the current National Commission on Culture and the Arts
- ARISE Philippines Act - An act seeking to offer various forms of assistance to MSMEs and other sectors affected by the COVID-19 Pandemic and rebuild consumer confidence.
- Anti-Hazing Act - An act that addresses violence in educational institutions, organizations, and those of community-based due to the alarming increase in the number of deaths resulting from the act of hazing. It prohibits all forms of hazing that will inflict direct or indirect physical or psychological suffering to the recruit at any stage of initiation.
- Free Irrigation Services Act - An act that aims to address social order by offering a Free Irrigation Program to all farmers, irrigators' associations, and farmers' cooperatives through the assistance of the National Irrigation Association.
- Gabaldon School Buildings Conservation Act - An act aiming to conserve, restore, and protect the country's historical and cultural heritage and resources by focusing the government's efforts towards Gabaldon school buildings.
- Revised Agricultural Tariffication Act - An Act seeking to secure the country's staple source of food by imposing tariffs on all imports of rice.
- Department of Human Settlements and Urban Development Act - An act establishing a department responsible for the management of all housing, human settlement, an urban development nationwide.
- Philippine Qualifications Framework Act - An act that strengthens the constitutional rights of every Filipino by providing quality and accessible education at all levels by institutionalizing the PQF.
- An Act Ensuring the Preservation and Management of Protected Areas - An act that aims to continuously protect and maintain protected areas that have been notably recognized with biologically unique features from the increasing human activities that also affects these areas through the National Integrated Protected Areas System.
- San Fabian Holiday - An act that declares March 21 of every year, a special non-working holiday in the whole municipality of San Fabian, Pangasinan in commemoration of its founding anniversary.
- Edades and Bernal Museum - An act which seeks to establish an Edades and Bernal Museum in the City of Dagupan, Pangasinan.

== Electoral history ==
Electoral history of Christopher de Venecia
Year	Office	Party	Votes received				Result
Year	Office	Party	Total	%	P.	Swing	Result
2016	Representative (Pangasinan–4th)	Liberal	172,089	91.72%	1st	—N/a	Won
2019	Representative (Pangasinan–4th)	Lakas	166,917	73.22%	1st	-18.50	Won
2022	Representative (Pangasinan–4th)	Lakas	213,020	80.03%	1st	+6.81	Won

== Theater career ==
Directing Experience

Year	Title	Awards / Citation	Role	Source
2019	Dani Girl: A Musical About Hope	2019 Broadway World Awards nominations for: Best Director, Best Actress (Musical), Best Supporting Actor (Musical), and Best Supporting Actress (Musical) 2019 Gawad Buhay Awards nominations for: Outstanding Stage Direction (Musical), Outstanding Production for Existing Material, Outstanding Set Design, Outstanding Musical Direction, Outstanding Sound Design, Male Featured Performance in a Musical, Female Featured Performance in a Musical, Female Lead Performance, and Outstanding Ensemble Performance 2019 Inquirer Best of Theater Awards citations for: Best Actress (Musical), Best Actor (Musical)	Director	
2017	Company Call: Bluerep at 25		Director	
2015	No Filter 2.0: The Millennial Monologues		Director and Creator	
2015	No Filter: The Millennial Monologues		Director and Creator	
2015	Ang Tugon ni Conchita		Director	
2015	The Boy in the Bathroom		Director	
2015	F(r)iction: A new Musical		Director	
2014	The Glass Menagerie	Winner, Bravo! Best of Theater Awards for 2014 Best Featured Actor for JC Santos, Best Featured Actress for Justine Peña	Director	
2014	Dani Girl: A Musical Good for the Soul	Inquirer Bravo! Best of Theater Awards 2014 : Best Musical (Non-Filipino Material), Best Featured Actor – Musical, Best Featured Actress – Musical, and nominations for Best Director, Best Actress, Best Featured Actor and Musical Direction Broadway World Philippines nominations for: Best Director, Best Actress, Best Actor, Best Featured Actress, Best Costume Design, Best Lighting Design, Best Scenic Design, Best Theater Company	Director	
2014	The Boy in the Bathroom	Winner, Bravo! Best of Theater Awards for 2014 Best Featured Actor for Topper Fabregas, Best Featured Actress for Shiela Francisco	Director	
2013-2014	Wait Until Dark		Assistant Director	
2013	A New Brain: The Musical		Director	
2010-2012	Slideshow		Director	
2012	13: The Musical		Director	
2012	Spell 13: A Musical Revue		Director	
2011-2012	Company Call: Bluerep at 20		Director	
2011-2012	You're a Good Man Charlie Brown		Assistant Director	
2011	Little Shop of Horrors	Broadway World Philippines nomination for: Best Director (Musical)	Director	
2008	All Shook Up		Co-Director p	
2007-2008	Batboy: The Musical		Assistant Director	
2007	The 25th Annual Putnam County Spelling Bee		Assistant Director	

ACTING EXPERIENCE

Year	Title	Awards / Citation	Role	Source
2011-2012	You're a Good Man, Charlie Brown		Linus	
2008	Disney's Mulan Jr.		Ancestor Yao, Private Hong	
2007-2008	Batboy: The Musical		Pan	
2006-2007	Disney's High School Musical		Thespian	
2006	Hope for the Flowers		Stripe	
2006-2007	Disney's Aladdin Jr.		Iago, Narrator 2	
2005	Emperor's New Clothes		Mr. Sew, Paige	

== Filmography ==
=== Television ===
Year	Title	Role	Notes	Source
1993-95	Ober Da Bakod	Dagul		
1993-94	Billy Bilyonaryo	Billy		
1993-95	Haybol Rambol			

=== Film ===
Year	Title	Role	Notes	Source
1993	Pretty Boy	Bongbong		
1993	Kung Kailangan Mo Ako			
1994	Ober Da Bakod: The Movie	Dagul		
1994	Oo na sige na	Ampon ni Bonggoy		
