= Edward Maceda =

Filipino politician (born 1970)

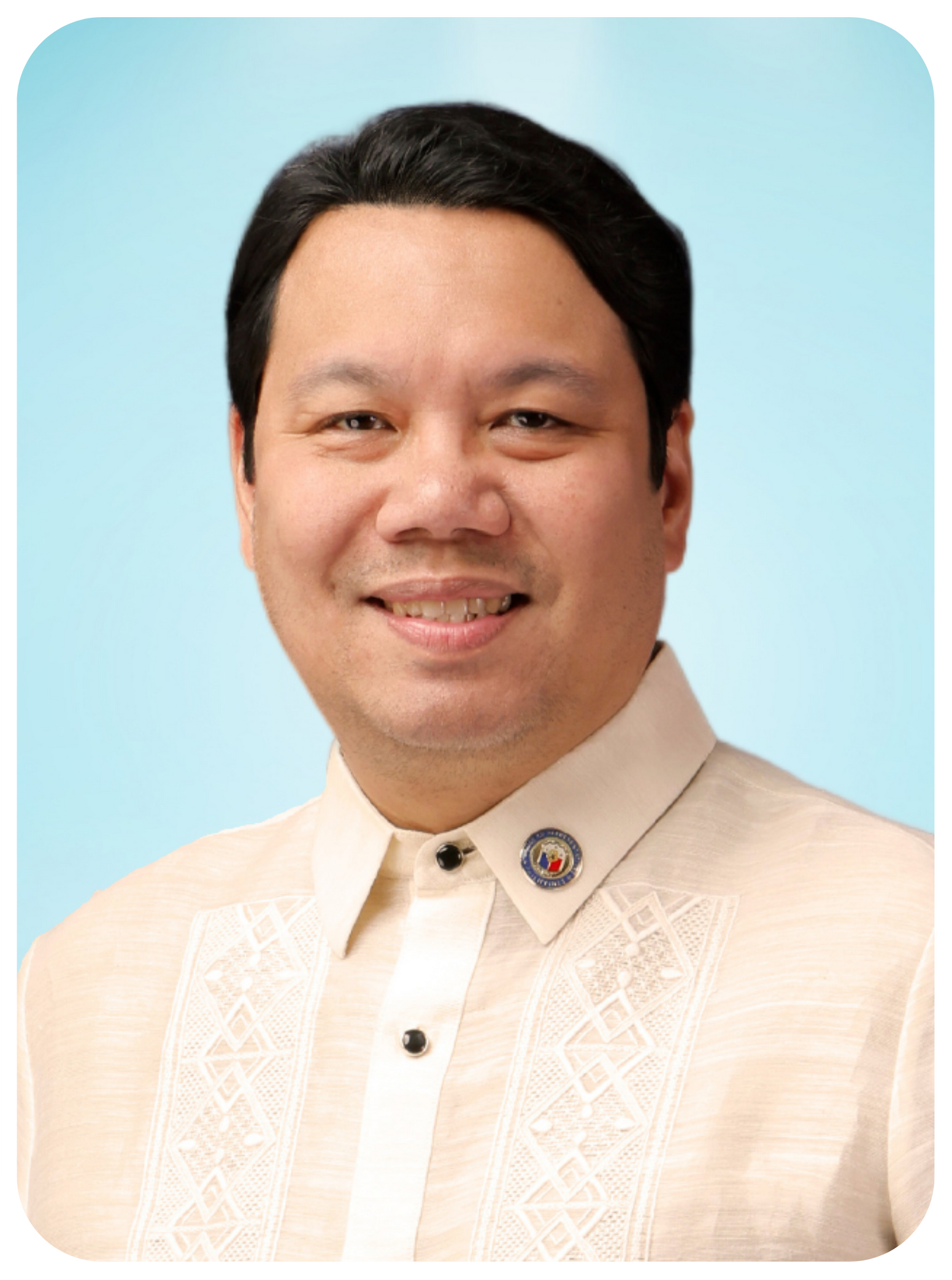
- Official portrait, 2022

Member of the Philippine House of Representatives from Manila's 4th congressional district
- In office June 30, 2016 – June 30, 2025
- Preceded by: Trisha Bonoan-David
- Succeeded by: Giselle Lazaro-Maceda

Member of the Manila City Council from the 4th district
- In office June 30, 2007 – June 30, 2016
- In office June 30, 1995 – June 30, 2004

Personal details
- Born: Edward Michael Vera Perez Maceda; October 3, 1970 (age 56)
- Citizenship: Filipino
- Party: NPC (1998–2006, 2021–present); Asenso Manileño (local party; 2015–2018, 2021–present)
- Other political affiliations: UNA (2012–2015); PMP (2009–2021); UNO (2006–2009); PRP (1995–1998)
- Spouse: Giselle Lazaro (m. 2017)
- Parent(s): Ernesto Maceda; Marichu Vera-Perez
- Relatives: Christopher de Venecia (cousin); Jose O. Vera (great-grandfather)
- Education: University of the Philippines Diliman (AB); Ateneo de Manila University (LL.B)
- Occupation: Politician
- Profession: Lawyer

Edward Michael Vera Perez Maceda (born October 3, 1970) is a Filipino lawyer and politician who served as the representative of Manila's 4th district from 2016 to 2025. Prior to his election as congressman, he was councilor of the same district from 1995 to 2004 and from 2007 to 2016.

== Early life and education ==
Maceda was born on October 3, 1970, the youngest of five sons of Ernesto Maceda and Maria Azucena, popularly known as Marichu Vera-Perez. He has four older brothers, Emmanuel, Ernesto Jr., Erwin and Edmond. His cousin, Pangasinan's 4th District Representative Christopher de Venecia, is the son of Marichu's sister Gina de Venecia.

He finished his grade school and high school at La Salle Greenhills. He went to university at University of the Philippines Diliman and finished the AB Journalism in the college of Mass Communication and went to Ateneo Law School where he finished his 4 years of Law. After that, he took the bar exam a year later and passed.

== Political career ==
=== Manila councilor ===
As his brother and Councilor Ernesto Maceda Jr. had to continue his study in the United States, Maceda ran for councilor in 1995 serving for three terms from 1995 to 2004. He ran again for councilor in 2007, serving for another three terms until 2016.

=== Representative from Manila ===
He ran in 2016 for the congressional race under Asenso Manileño and won with a total of 46,349 votes defeating Don Juan Bagatsing and Annie Bonoan.

On March 8, 2017, Maceda voted against House Bill 4727 which the bill that seeks the return of the death penalty, while his cousin Christopher de Venecia voted in favor of the bill.

In 2019, he was re-elected in the same seat and won over his predecessor Trisha Bonoan-David and barangay kagawad Christopher Gabriel.

On July 10, 2020, he and his cousin Christopher de Venecia are one of the 11 representatives who voted to grant the franchise renewal of ABS-CBN. He is one of the two Manila lawmakers to grant the franchise alongside Benny Abante.

In the May 2022 elections, he ran for the congressional race for his third and last term under National People's Coalition (NPC) and won over Bonoan-David and Gabriel once again. His term ended in 2025 and was succeeded by his wife Giselle.

== Personal life ==
Maceda is married to Giselle Maceda, who succeeded him as representative for the fourth district of Manila. The couple wed on January 21, 2017, at Sampaguita Gardens in Quezon City.
