= Pira-pirasong Pangarap =

Philippine television and radio drama series

- Genre: Drama
- Developed by: Marichu Maceda
- Directed by: Television; Gina Alajar; Manny Castañeda; Albert Martinez; Soxie Topacio; Ruel S. Bayani; Jeffrey Jeturian; Joey Romero; Khryss Adalia; Radio; Lucio Maylas
- Presented by: Gina de Venecia
- Opening theme: "Pira-pirasong Pangarap" by Dulce
- Country of origin: Philippines
- Original language: Tagalog

Production
- Executive producers: Jo-Ann Banaga (television); Gypsy Baldovino (radio)
- Camera setup: Multiple-camera setup
- Running time: 30 minutes
- Production company: Sampaguita Television

Original release
- Network: GMA Network
- Release: June 1996 (radio); August 18, 1997 (television); – February 21, 2003

Pira-pirasong Pangarap (transl. fragments of dreams) is a Philippine television drama anthology series broadcast by GMA Network and Super Radyo DZBB. Hosted by Gina de Venecia, it premiered on August 18, 1997. The series concluded on February 21, 2003.

== Overview ==
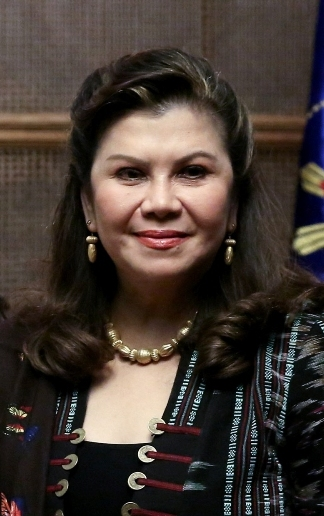
Gina de Venecia serves as a host.

The plight of battered women and children whose lives were transformed by The Haven for Women (an establishment of the nine-building in Alabang. It was inaugurated on September 30, 1995. Its main goal is to rehabilitate the abused women and help them to reclaim their God-given right to live with dignity) served as inspiration for her to come up a radio drama program entitled Pira-pirasong Pangarap, launched in June 1996 on DZRH. The following year, the TV version made its debut on GMA Network. This also the radio drama to moved from DZRH to Super Radyo DZBB, the AM radio station of GMA Network. During its run, the show raked in five Best Drama Series trophies from the Philippine Movie Press Club's (PMPC) Star Award.
