= Thomas J. Tierney =

American business magnate (born 1954)

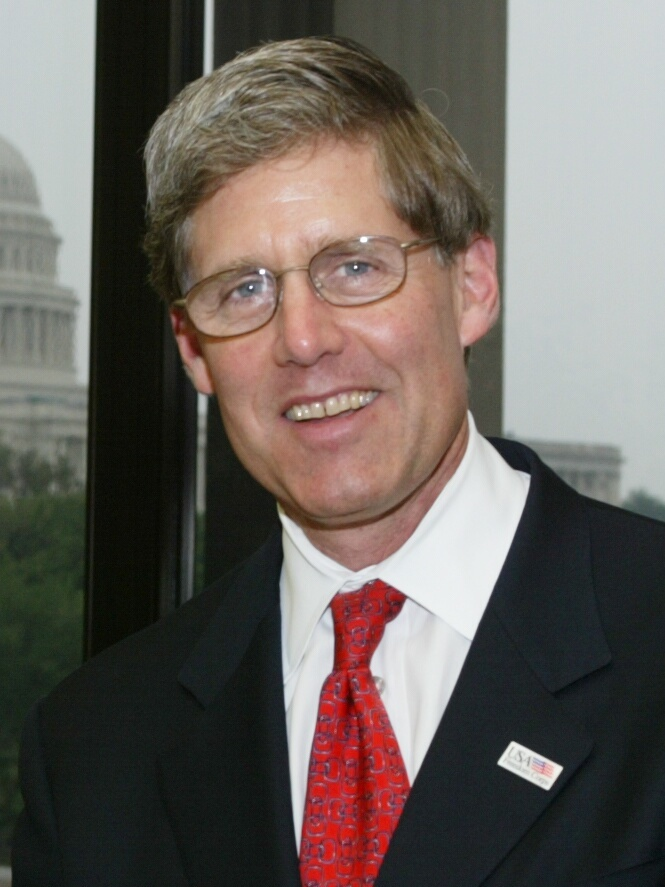
- Tierney in 2003
- Born: March 5, 1954 (age 72); San Francisco, California, US
- Education: University of California, Davis; Harvard Business School
- Occupation: Business executive
- Title: Chairman, eBay
- Term: 2015-

Thomas J. Tierney (born 5 March 1954) is an American business executive and corporate writer, who is the co-founder of the nonprofit Bridgespan Group that provides management consulting to nonprofits and philanthropists. He was chairman of eBay from July 2015 to June 2020.

Tierney is cited by the book Management Consultancy in the 21st Century as a specialist in customer service and marketing.

== Early life ==
Tierney was born in San Francisco, California in 1954. Tierney earned a BA in economics from the University of California, Davis in 1976, and an MBA from the Harvard Business School in 1980.

== Career ==
He joined Bain & Company in 1980, and served as the managing director of its San Francisco office from 1987 to 1992. In June 1992 he was appointed chief executive officer of Bain & Company, a post which he held until January 2000, during which time the company grew significantly, venturing into business internationally and generating revenues six times what they had been.

In 1998, Tierney co-founded The Bridgespan Group, described by Bloomberg as an "independent, nonprofit affiliate of Bain & Company designed to provide general management consulting services to foundations and nonprofit organizations". He launched the organization in 1999, and was appointed its chairman. In March 2003, Tierney was appointed an Independent Director at eBay, and he has been its Lead Independent Director since April 2012.

Aside from his Bridgespan and eBay position, Tierney has been the Director of The Nature Conservancy, director of the Woods Hole Oceanographic Institution, and has held numerous other posts on non-profit boards, including the Hoover Institution, The United Way of the Bay Area, the Committee for Economic Development and the WGBH Educational Foundation. He has also served administratively with the Boston Symphony Orchestra. Tierney is still associated with Harvard Business School, where he was appointed chair of the Harvard Business School Social Enterprise Initiative Advisory Board in January 2009. He occasionally lectures at the school and has contributed numerous articles to The Harvard Business Review and books, including Forbes's Learning From The Chief Executive Officer and Aligning the Stars (2002), the latter co-authored with Jay W. Lorsch, which documents business strategy and organization. In 2011, he co-authored Give Smart: Philanthropy That Gets Results with Joel L. Fleishman. Tierney said of Give Smart: Philanthropy That Gets Results: "The basic premise behind the book is that there must be ideas relevant to philanthropy that have been proven over time, ideas that were as useful to Andrew Carnegie as they are to Bill Gates. One of the reasons [co-author] Joel [Fleishman] and I teamed up was that he has done extensive research on twentieth-century philanthropy, a lot of which he used in The Foundation".
