= Trisha Bonoan-David =

Filipino lawer and politician

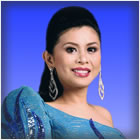
- Bonoan-David in 2013, during the 16th Congress

Member of the Philippine House of Representatives from Manila's 4th congressional district
- In office June 30, 2007 – June 30, 2016
- Preceded by: Rodolfo Bacani
- Succeeded by: Edward Maceda

Member of the Manila City Council from the 4th district
- In office June 30, 1998 – June 30, 2007

Personal details
- Born: Maria Theresa Brondial Bonoan; April 23, 1967 (age 59) Manila, Philippines
- Party: Independent (2021–present)
- Other political affiliations: Asenso Manileño (2015–2021); NUP (2011–2021); Lakas (2006–2011)
- Spouse: Atty. Rosauro Angelito S. David
- Parent(s): Zenaida B. Bonoan Emilio C. Bonoan (Former Manila 4th, District Councilor)
- Education: St. Paul University Quezon City (AB); San Beda College; Arellano University (LLB); Ateneo de Manila University (MBA)
- Occupation: Politician
- Profession: Lawyer
- Nickname(s): Trisha, (stage name) Trishia (can be referred to), and Tricia (sometimes spelled as)

Maria Theresa Brondial Bonoan-David (professionally known as Trisha Bonoan-David; born April 23, 1967) is a Filipino lawyer and politician who last served as the representative of the 4th district of Manila from 2007 to 2016. She also previously served as a member of the Manila City Council from the same district from 1998 to 2007.

== Early life ==
Bonoan-David was born on April 23, 1967.

== Political career ==
=== Councilor (1998–2007) ===
She started her political career as a councilor of Manila from the 4th district in 1998. She was re-elected in 2001 and 2004.

=== Representative, 4th District of Manila (2007–2016) ===
She started her political career as the representative of Manila's 4th district in 2007. She was reelected in 2010, defeating her predecessor Rodolfo Bacani who is attempting for a comeback, and in 2013, running unopposed.

She has created bills including:

- HB02069 - AN ACT PROVIDING FOR THE CONVERSION OF CALAMBA STREET, SAMPALOC IN THE CITY OF MANILA, INTO A NATIONAL ROAD AND APPROPRIATING FUNDS FOR THE MAINTENANCE AND IMPROVEMENT THEREOF
- HB02070 - A MORATORIUM ON THE POWER OF THE LOCAL GOVERNMENT UNITS TO RE-CLASSIFY AGRICULTURAL LAND TO NON-AGRICULTURAL LANDS UNDER R.A. 7160 (LOCAL GOVERNMENT CODE OF 1991)
- HB03057 - AN ACT PROHIBITING THE IMPORTATION OF ALL KINDS OF GMO PRODUCTS, AND FOR OTHER PURPOSES
- HB03058 - AN ACT AMENDING REPUBLIC ACT NO. 8972, OTHERWISE KNOWN AS THE SOLO PARENTS' WELFARE ACT OF 2000, BY PROVIDING FOR ADDITIONAL BENEFITS AND PENAL PROVISION FOR VIOLATIONS OF THE ACT
- HB03108 - AN ACT IMPOSING CIVIL PENALTIES ON UNREASONABLE PRICE INCREASES FOR CRUDE OIL, RESIDUAL FUEL OIL, OR REFINED PETROLEUM PRODUCTS
- HB03444 - AN ACT AMENDING SECTION 10, REPUBLIC ACT 7832, OTHERWISE KNOWN AS THE "ANTI-ELECTRICITY AND ELECTRIC TRANSMISSION LINE/MATERIALS PILFERAGE ACT OF 1994

=== Vice Mayoral attempt (2016) ===
As she was barred for running for a fourth consecutive term in the Congress, she ran for vice mayor under NUP in 2016. Although she did not have an official running mate, she supported the mayoral candidacy of former Mayor Alfredo Lim. She lost to former Councilor Honey Lacuna of Asenso Manileño. She stepped down from Congress after finishing her third term on June 30, 2016.

=== Comeback attempt in congress (2019, 2022 and 2025) ===
She attempted a comeback to Congress in 2019 under Asenso Manileño and in 2022 and the local UniTeam ticket, but lost in both occasions to her successor Edward Maceda. She attempted a comeback to Congress in the 2025 as an independent, but lost to Giselle Maceda.
