= Rainbow Coalition (Philippines) =

Political party group, from 1992 to 1998

- Leader: Jose de Venecia Jr.
- Founder: Jose de Venecia Jr.
- Founded: 1992
- Dissolved: 1998
- Succeeded by: Sunshine Coalition
- Political position: Big tent
- Coalition members: Lakas; Laban (1992–1997); NPC (1992–1997); Liberal; Nacionalista; PDP–Laban; KBL

The Rainbow Coalition was a multi-party coalition in the House of Representatives of the Philippines from 1992 to 1998. It was composed of Lakas, the Nationalist People's Coalition (NPC, 1992–1997), the Laban ng Demokratikong Pilipino (LDP, then known as Laban, 1992–1997), the Liberal Party, the Nacionalista Party, the Partido Demokratiko Pilipino–Lakas ng Bayan (PDP–Laban), and the Kilusang Bagong Lipunan (KBL). The coalition was led by then House Speaker Jose de Venecia Jr.

== History ==
After Fidel Valdez Ramos of Lakas won the presidency in 1992 with a plurality of the vote, Pangasinan representative Jose de Venecia Jr. of Lakas, from the 4th congressional district, was tasked to form a multi-party coalition in the House of Representatives to secure support for the president's legislative agenda. In the same election, the Laban ng Demokratikong Pilipino (LDP, then known as Laban) won the largest number of seats with 86, followed by Lakas with 41 seats, and the Nationalist People's Coalition (NPC) of Eduardo "Danding" Cojuangco Jr., one of Ramos's opponents, with 30 seats. De Venecia subsequently built a coalition among these parties, later joined by the Liberal Party and the Nacionalista Party.

The coalition continued after the 1995 elections and was strengthened with the formal creation of the Lakas–Laban Coalition between Lakas and the LDP.

By 1998, however, the coalition had become defunct after both the LDP and NPC supported Vice President Joseph Estrada's candidacy for the presidency. In the same year, De Venecia ran as the presidential candidate of Lakas against Estrada.

== Successor coalitions ==
=== Sunshine Coalition ===
After the ouster of Joseph Estrada from the presidency in 2001, Gloria Macapagal Arroyo assumed office. Following the 2001 elections, former House Speaker Jose de Venecia Jr., who had lost his presidential bid in 1998, returned to his post as Speaker of the House of Representatives. De Venecia revived the coalition model during the 2001 elections under the name Sunshine Coalition. Members of the original Rainbow Coalition were recruited, along with additional parties such as PDP–Laban, Reporma, Aksyon Demokratiko, Imee Marcos's Kilusang Bagong Lipunan (KBL), and Tomas Osmeña's Probinsya Muna Development Initiative (PROMDI). The Laban ng Demokratikong Pilipino (LDP), however, remained aligned with Estrada.

In 2003, following the unsuccessful impeachment attempt against Chief Justice Hilario Davide Jr., rumors circulated that the coalition might collapse due to the Nationalist People's Coalition (NPC) expressing disappointment over the failed proceedings. Reports also suggested that a faction within the House was dissatisfied with De Venecia's leadership and was preparing to challenge his speakership. The NPC later withdrew from the coalition in preparation for the 2004 elections and was rumored to be considering joining the opposition.

=== Dawn Coalition ===
After the disbandment of the Sunshine Coalition, Congressman Robert "Ace" Barbers of Surigao del Norte's 1st district proposed the creation of a new bloc, called the Dawn Coalition. Its primary purpose was to consolidate support in the House of Representatives and secure the speakership for De Venecia.

== Formula usage ==
=== 2013 ===
The senatorial slate of President Benigno Aquino III's Team PNoy in 2013 included only three members from the Liberal Party: Bam Aquino, Jamby Madrigal, and Jun Magsaysay. The rest of the candidates came from the Nacionalista Party, PDP–Laban, independent politicians, and the party-list group Akbayan. A Rappler article noted that the coalition's strategy was modeled on De Venecia's 1992 formula.

=== 2016 ===
Following the 2016 elections, Rodrigo Duterte was elected president. Pantaleon Alvarez, who was soon to become Speaker of the House of Representatives, organized a coalition similar to the Rainbow Coalition, with PDP–Laban as the leading party.

== Criticism ==
Ed Lingao, a former personnel of the Philippine Center for Investigative Journalism and anchor of TV5's News explainED, opined that the formation of the Rainbow Coalition in 1992 nearly eliminated the opposition bloc in the House of Representatives. He also argued that the coalition lacked clear intentions or goals, and that the distinct identities of the political parties "melted" into one, making them effectively indistinguishable from each other.

== See also ==
- Lakas–Laban Coalition, their Senate counterpart
