= The Bridgespan Group =

U.S. nonprofit organization in Boston, Massachusetts

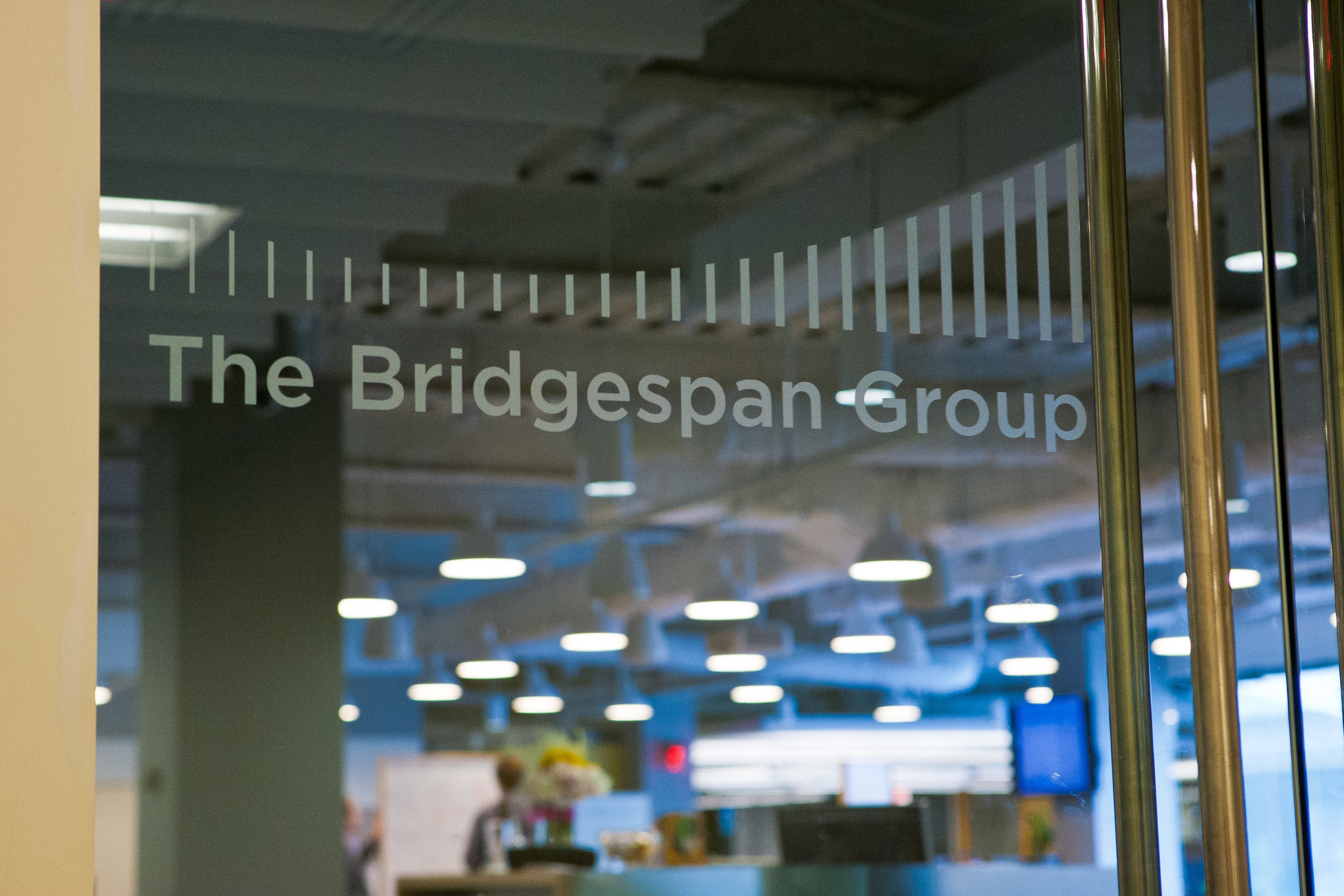
- The Bridgespan Group's Boston Office
- Formation: 2000
- Founders: Thomas Tierney, Jeffrey Bradach, Paul Carttar
- Tax ID no.: 31-1625487
- Headquarters: 2 Copley Place; Boston, Massachusetts, United States
- Services: Management consulting, Philanthrocapitalism
- Key people: William Foster, Managing Partner
- Revenue: c. $100M
- Staff: c. 500
- Website: bridgespan.org

The Bridgespan Group is a U.S. nonprofit organization headquartered in Boston, Massachusetts that provides management consulting to nonprofits and philanthropists. In addition to consulting, Bridgespan makes case studies freely available on its website and publications.

Bridgespan was launched in 1999 by Thomas Tierney, formerly managing director of Bain & Company, professor Jeffrey Bradach, from Harvard Business School, and Paul Carttar, formerly a vice president at Bain & Company. The organization has received substantial support from Bain, with whom it has maintained a close relationship. The firm has six offices worldwide.

== History ==
Bridgespan grew from a desire by Bain & Company to expand their support of nonprofits. The idea started by doing occasional pro bono work for nonprofits. Bain consultant Thomas Tierney had been involved with nonprofit work since the 1980s. After becoming worldwide managing director, Tierney began to focus his attention on consulting for charities. Between 1995 and 1999, three studies about the nonprofit market were conducted. The decision was made to create an allied, yet still independent, entity called the Bridgespan Group.

In 1996, co-founder Jeff Bradach, a business professor and former Bain consultant, joined the company. In 1998, co-founder Paul Carttar, a former Bain Partner, joined. Tierney pitched the idea of forming Bridgespan to his partners in 1999. He emphasized his desire for an ongoing partnership with Bain, which would accrue benefits (e.g., recruitment as well as public relations). Bain provided Bridgespan with a one million dollar grant for the first three years, in addition to administrative support and several loaned employees ("externs"). The organization was also initially supported by grants from the Surdna Foundation, Bill & Melinda Gates Foundation, the William and Flora Hewlett Foundation, the Edna McConnell Clark Foundation and the Atlantic Philanthropies.

It has advised Bill & Melinda Gates Foundation, Ford Foundation, Bloomberg Philanthropies, the Rockefeller Foundation, YMCA of the USA, The Salvation Army, and the Sesame Workshop.

The group launched its first website, www.bridgespan.org, in 2000 and started operations from a Boston-based office. By fall of 2000, the organization had opened an office in San Francisco. Their services emphasized analytical consulting. Even with substantial subsidies, the assignments were sometimes too expensive for small charities with foundations often funding the work for the charities they supported.

In 2003, Bridgespan created the "Bridgestar" initiative that focused on leadership development and professional's transition into nonprofit careers. The Bridgestar.org site merged with Bridgespan.org in 2012.

In 2005, it received 1,700 applications for 18 positions while claiming that they can only serve 10% of the domestic US demand.

Bridgespan has expanded globally, opening offices in:

- New York (2007)
- Mumbai, India (2015)
- Johannesburg,South Africa (2019)
- Singapore (2022)

In 2022 The Economist published "Bridgespan Group: the most powerful consultants you've never heard of" which mentioned work with MacKenzie Scott and cited annual revenue of $59m and 329 employees in 2000.

== Current operations ==
The Bridgespan Group now operates from eight locations: offices in Boston, San Francisco, New York, Mumbai, Johannesburg and Singapore; and hubs in Washington and Delhi.

The Bridgespan Group's website is organized into several learning centers, focusing on particular aspects of nonprofit management, such as hiring, strategy and funding. The site includes free access to resources—articles, podcasts, videos, Q&A sessions, as well as several Bridgespan case studies. The website also features an online job board. The company releases research reports regarding non profit funding.

The organization claims it specializes in helping clients to effect the greatest possible change with their charitable donations and advises clients against spreading donations too thinly.
