= José Roxas Perez =

Filipino film producer (1915–1975)

Jose Roxas Perez
- Born: Jose Roxas Perez; October 15, 1915; Bulakan, Bulacan, Philippine Islands
- Died: July 28, 1975 (aged 59)
- Resting place: Manila Memorial Park – Sucat, Paranaque, Philippines
- Other name: Doc Perez
- Years active: 1951–1975
- Spouse: Nene Vera (m. 1941)
- Children: 7 (including Marichu Maceda and Gina de Venecia)
- Relatives: José O. Vera (father-in-law)

Jose Roxas Perez (October 15, 1915 – July 28, 1975) was a Filipino film producer and studio executive who headed Sampaguita Pictures.

== Early life and education ==
Jose Roxas Perez was born on October 15, 1915, in Bagumbayan, Bulakan, Bulacan. Perez attended the University of Santo Tomas where he obtained a degree in medicine prior to the outbreak of World War II. He did not continue his medicine career after he as an intern witness the death of his father who underwent an operation for acute appendicitis. His father had an anesthesia allergy.

== Career ==
Perez would inherit the production studio Sampaguita Pictures from his father-in-law José O. Vera. From 1951 to 1975, he would serve as the studio's marketing manager, general manager and executive producer. Doc Perez, as he affectionally called, would develop a reputation as a starmaker helping upstart the career of several actresses including Gloria Romero, Susan Roces, and Amalia Fuentes. The studio would see a decline in the late-1960s with the rise of bomba films.

== Death ==
Perez health would decline by the early 1970s which caused him to usually stay in his residences. He died on July 28, 1975, due to heart failure.

== Personal life ==
Perez was married to Azucena "Nene" Vera. They first met when both were students at the University of Santo Tomas. Vera was a chemistry student They had seven children. They got married December 10, 1941, amidst World War II and two days after the Pearl Harbor bombing.
