= International Association of Parliamentarians for Peace =

Organization of members of parliament

- Formation: February 15, 2016; 10 years ago
- Founded at: National Assembly, Seoul, South Korea
- Affiliations: Universal Peace Federation
- Website: www.upf.org/who/primary-associations/iapp

At the beginning of 2016, more than a hundred parliamentarians from more than 40 countries in the Korean Parliament founded the International Association of Parliamentarians for Peace, based on the "Parliamentarians for Peace" initiative launched by the founders of the Universal Peace Federation, Rev. Sun Myung Moon and Dr. Hak Ja Han Moon in 2001.

The main vision behind the launch of the International Association of Parliamentarians for Peace is to provide a platform for parliamentarians from different countries to use their experience to help find concrete solutions to world problems.

The International Association of Parliamentarians for Peace operates in several countries, including Nepal, Burkina Faso, the United Kingdom, Costa Rica, Paraguay, Zambia, Japan, and the United States, in the first year of its establishment and operation.

Former member of the US Congress Dan Burton and former speaker of the Philippine Parliament Jose de Venecia were the first Co-Chairmans of the International Association of Parliamentarians for peace.

== Resolution from the founding meeting ==
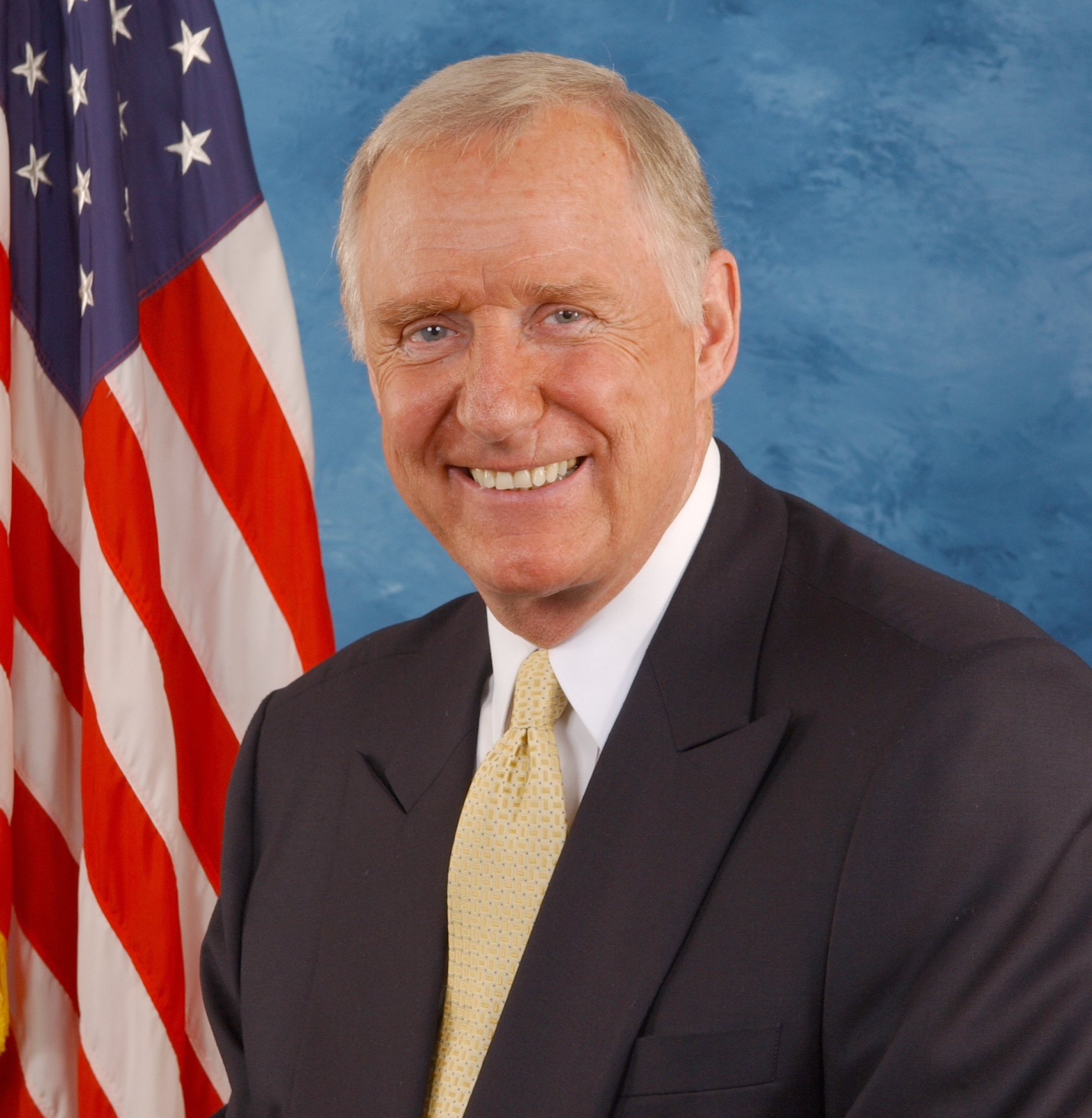
Dan Burton, The International Association of Parliamentarians for Peace, first Co-Chairman

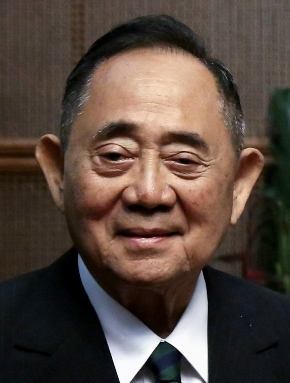
Jose de Venecia, The International Association of Parliamentarians for Peace, First Co-Chairman

During the establishment of the International Association of Parliamentarians for Peace in South Korea, a joint resolution was adopted.

Recognizing the current problems in the world such as religious conflicts, climate change, hunger and others, and especially pointing out the serious danger of the development of North Korea's nuclear program to peace in the world, the parliamentary representatives call on the international community to get involved in solving all these problems.

At the founding assembly, parliamentarians called on all people to work together to build sustainable and lasting peace in the world, while overcoming ideological, national, racial and other limitations, in accordance with publicly published information on the organization's official website.

A similar resolution was adopted at the Inaugural Conference of the International Association of Parliamentarians for Peace, Balkans, in September 2017.

== Goals ==
The International Association of Parliamentarians for Peace supports the work of the UN, and cooperate with other related organizations, including those that gather parliamentarians from other countries.

The main goals of The International Association of Parliamentarians for Peace are the following:

- Promote good governance in society
- Quality education for parliamentarians;
- To initiate communication and cooperation among parliamentarians around the world to promote and build peace
- Promote the dignity and value of all people, as members of one universal family
- To strengthen and promote the family as the central unit of society
- To encourage mutual trust and cooperation among all nations and
- To encourage cooperation between different religions of the world and to create a foundation for peace in the world

== Asia-Pacific Summit 2019 ==
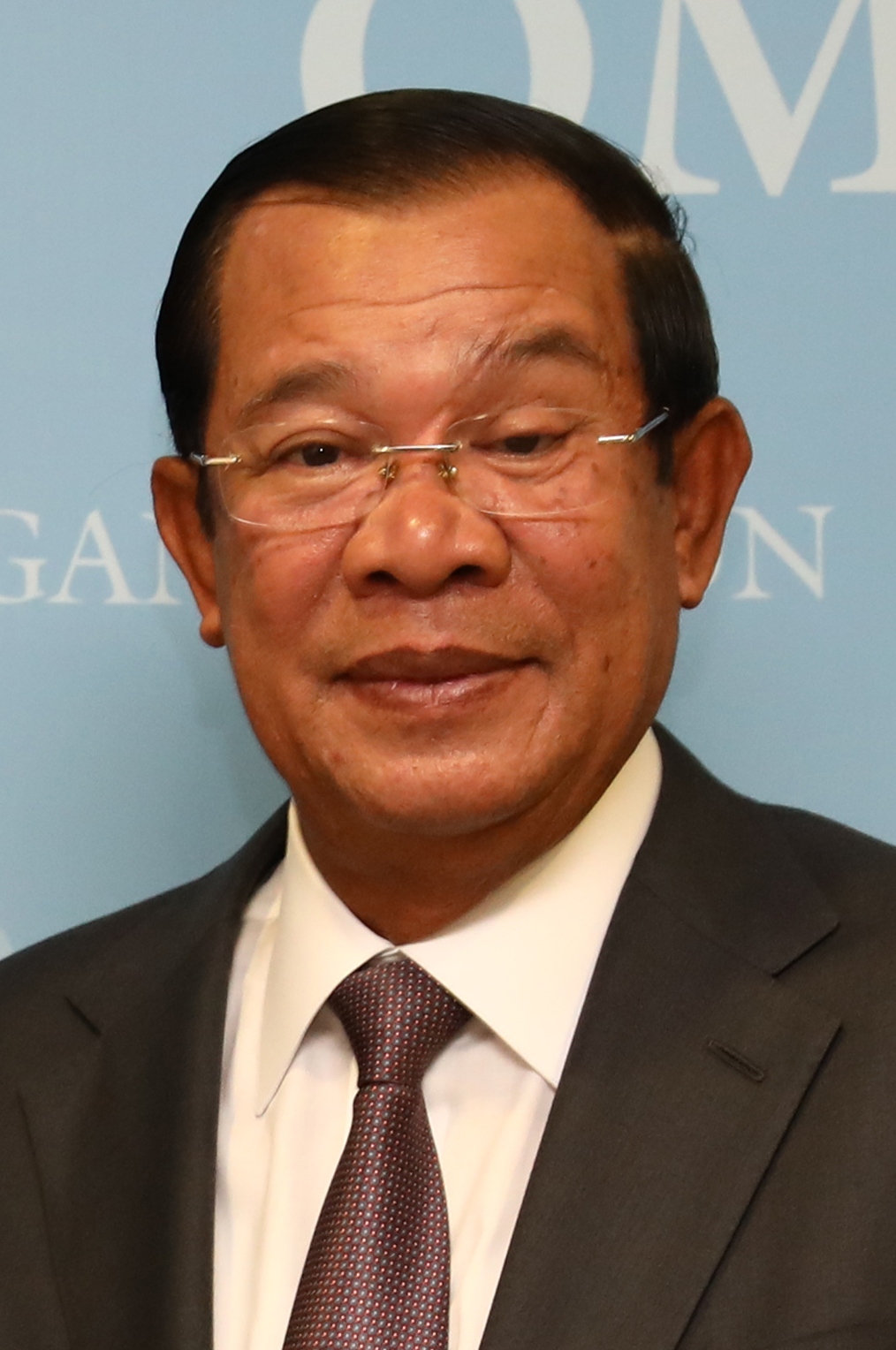
Prime Minister Hun Sen, Cambodia. Co-host, Asia-Pacific Summit 2019

The 2019 Asia-Pacific Summit was held in November 2019 in Phnom Penh, Cambodia. The summit was attended by almost 2,000 people, including several hundred delegates from more than 40 countries. Prime Minister of Cambodia Hun Sen also gave a speech at the summit. He called on representatives of governments and private organizations to work together in solving global crises.

Prime Minister Hun Sen called on all participants of the summit to cooperate in solving global challenges such as climate change, radicalism, gender inequality, human trafficking and other problems in the world.

The co-organizers of the summit were the Royal Government of Cambodia and the Universal Peace Federation, and in coordination with the International Association of Parliamentarians for Peace and other related organizations.

At the 2019 Asia-Pacific Summit, the Prime Minister of Cambodia, Hun Sen, received a special recognition from Dr. Hak Ja Han Moon, co-founder of the Universal Peace Federation, "Leadership and Good Governance" Award.

== Chapters ==
Country/Region	Foundation	Notes	Ref.
Balkans	Late-2017	Founded in Pristina, in the Assembly of Kosovo. The founders were Moisiu, former president of Albania, Mesic, former president of Croatia, Sejdiu, former president of Kosovo and others.	
Uganda	Late-2019	Founded with the support of The Speaker of Parliament, Rebecca Kadaga.	
Ghana	Mid-2021	Founded with the support of Parliament Speaker Alban Bagbin	
Liberia	Mid-2018	The Co-Chairman of the Committee on Peace, Faith and National Reconciliation of the House of Representatives, Dr. Isaac Roland, supported the establishment of IAPP in Liberia.	
Zambia	Late-2016	UPF East and Southern Africa General Secretary Mr. Ghomsi announced the launch of IAPP in Zambia during the first Regional International Leadership Conference.	
Samoa	Early-2018	The head of state also participated in the event.	
Jamaica	Late-2017	Founded with the support of Dennis Salmon from UPF.	
Peru	Late-2017	Founded with support from congressman Dr. Yonhy Lescano Ancieta.	
