= Big Three (management consultancies) =

World's three largest strategy consulting firms

MBB Logos: McKinsey, BCG, Bain

The Big Three or MBB refers to management consulting firms McKinsey & Company, Boston Consulting Group, and Bain & Company. The three companies are distinguished by the depth and rigor of their analyses and recommendations, rich histories of service dating back to their foundings in the mid-20th century, and strong client bases spanning some of the world's largest and more important companies.

The MBB firms recruit consultants from universities, MBA programs and industry. While historically associated with strategy consulting, they also provide services in areas such as operating model design, performance improvement, mergers and acquisitions due diligence, human capital and digital transformation.

MBB firms have also been the subject of criticism over the years for alleged unethical activities, with a prominent example being McKinsey's role in helping Purdue Pharma "turbo-charge" its sales of OxyContin, which has been cited as a direct contributor to the opioid epidemic in the United States.

== The firms ==
McKinsey & Company, Boston Consulting Group, and Bain & Company, collectively referred to as "MBB", are widely considered the three top and most prestigious strategy consulting firms in the world. Jobs at these firms are among the most sought after by MBA students and have a less than 1% acceptance rate.

These three firms are among the world's largest strategy consulting firms by revenue. Their latest publicly available data is summarized in the table below:

Firm	Employees (year)	Revenue (year)	Revenue per Employee	Locations (cities)	Headquarters
McKinsey & Company	38,000 (2025)	$16 B (2025)	$421 K	133	New York
Boston Consulting Group	33,500 (2025)	$14.4 B (2025)	$429 K	100+	Boston
Bain & Company	18,385 (2025)	$9.8 B (2025)	$533 K	65	Boston

== See also ==
- Big Four accounting firms
- Major film studios
- Corporate services
- List of management consulting firms
