= Ernesto Maceda =

President of the Senate of the Philippines from 1996 to 1998

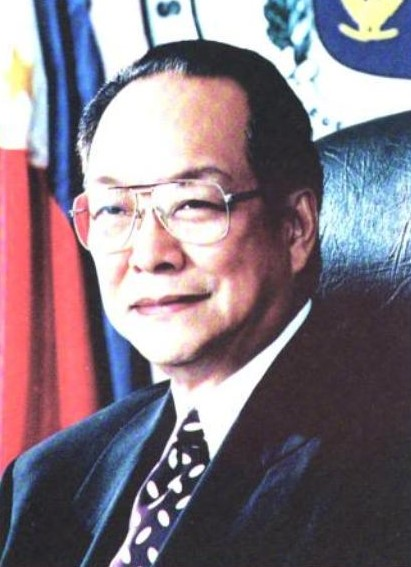
- Maceda in 1997

18th President of the Senate of the Philippines
- In office October 10, 1996 – January 26, 1998
- Preceded by: Neptali Gonzales
- Succeeded by: Neptali Gonzales

Senate Minority Leader
- In office January 26, 1998 – June 30, 1998
- Preceded by: Neptali Gonzales
- Succeeded by: Teofisto Guingona Jr.

President pro tempore of the Senate of the Philippines
- In office January 18, 1992 – January 18, 1993
- Preceded by: Sotero Laurel
- Succeeded by: Teofisto Guingona Jr.

Senator of the Philippines
- In office June 30, 1987 – June 30, 1998
- In office December 30, 1971 – September 23, 1972

Minister of Environment and Natural Resources
- In office February 25, 1986 – December 1, 1986
- Preceded by: Rodolfo del Rosario
- Succeeded by: Carlos Dominguez III

Ambassador of the Philippines to the United States
- In office 1999–2001
- President: Joseph Estrada
- Preceded by: Raul Rabe
- Succeeded by: Albert del Rosario

19th Secretary of Commerce and Industry
- In office 1970–1971
- President: Ferdinand Marcos
- Preceded by: Leonides Sarao Virata
- Succeeded by: Troadio Quiazon

20th Vice Mayor of Manila
- In office January 1, 1970 – August 31, 1970
- Mayor: Antonio Villegas
- Preceded by: Felicisimo R. Cabigao
- Succeeded by: Danny Lacuna

17th Executive Secretary of the Philippines
- In office July 26, 1969 – February 7, 1970
- President: Ferdinand Marcos
- Preceded by: Rafael M. Salas
- Succeeded by: Alejandro Melchor Jr.

Presidential Assistant on Community Development
- In office 1966–1969
- President: Ferdinand Marcos

Member of the Manila Municipal Board from the 3rd district
- In office December 30, 1959 – December 30, 1967

Personal details
- Born: Ernesto Madarang Maceda; March 26, 1935 Pagsanjan, Laguna, Philippine Islands
- Died: June 20, 2016 (aged 81) Quezon City, Philippines
- Resting place: Loyola Memorial Park, Marikina
- Party: UNA (2012–2016)
- Other political affiliations: NPC (1992–2016); UNO (2005–2010); Liberal (1987–1992); Laban (1978–1986); Nacionalista (1959–1987)
- Spouse: Marichu Vera Perez (m. 1962)
- Children: 5 (including Manny and Edward)
- Education: Ateneo de Manila University (AA, LL.B.); Harvard Law School (LL.M.)
- Occupation: Lawyer, Politician

Ernesto "Ernie" Madarang Maceda Sr. (March 26, 1935 – June 20, 2016) was a Filipino politician, lawyer, and columnist who served as a Senator of the Philippines from 1971 to 1972 and again from 1987 to 1998. He served as Senate President from 1996 to 1998.

== Early life and career ==
Maceda was born on March 26, 1935, in Pagsanjan, Laguna to Antonio Maceda (1892–1969) and Corazon Vergara Madarang (1912–2008). Maceda earned his Associate in Arts degree, magna cum laude, in 1952, and Bachelor of Laws degree, cum laude, from the Ateneo de Manila University in 1956. He then finished Master of Laws, taxation and international law, at Harvard Law School, Massachusetts, United States, in 1957.

At the age of 23, he was hailed as the No. 1 councilor of Manila in 1959. Because of his numerous achievements in the then Manila Municipal Board, Councilor Maceda was named “Outstanding Councilor of Manila".

== Roles in the Marcos Cabinet ==
In 1966, Maceda was appointed the Presidential Assistant on Community Development and was the youngest Cabinet Member of the Marcos administration.

In 1969, he was appointed executive secretary in concurrent capacity as chairman of the Commission on Reorganization.

In 1970, the Commerce and Industry portfolio was given to Maceda. In the post, he launched consumer protection programs and established trade relations with various Eastern European Social countries.

== Senator (1971–1972) ==
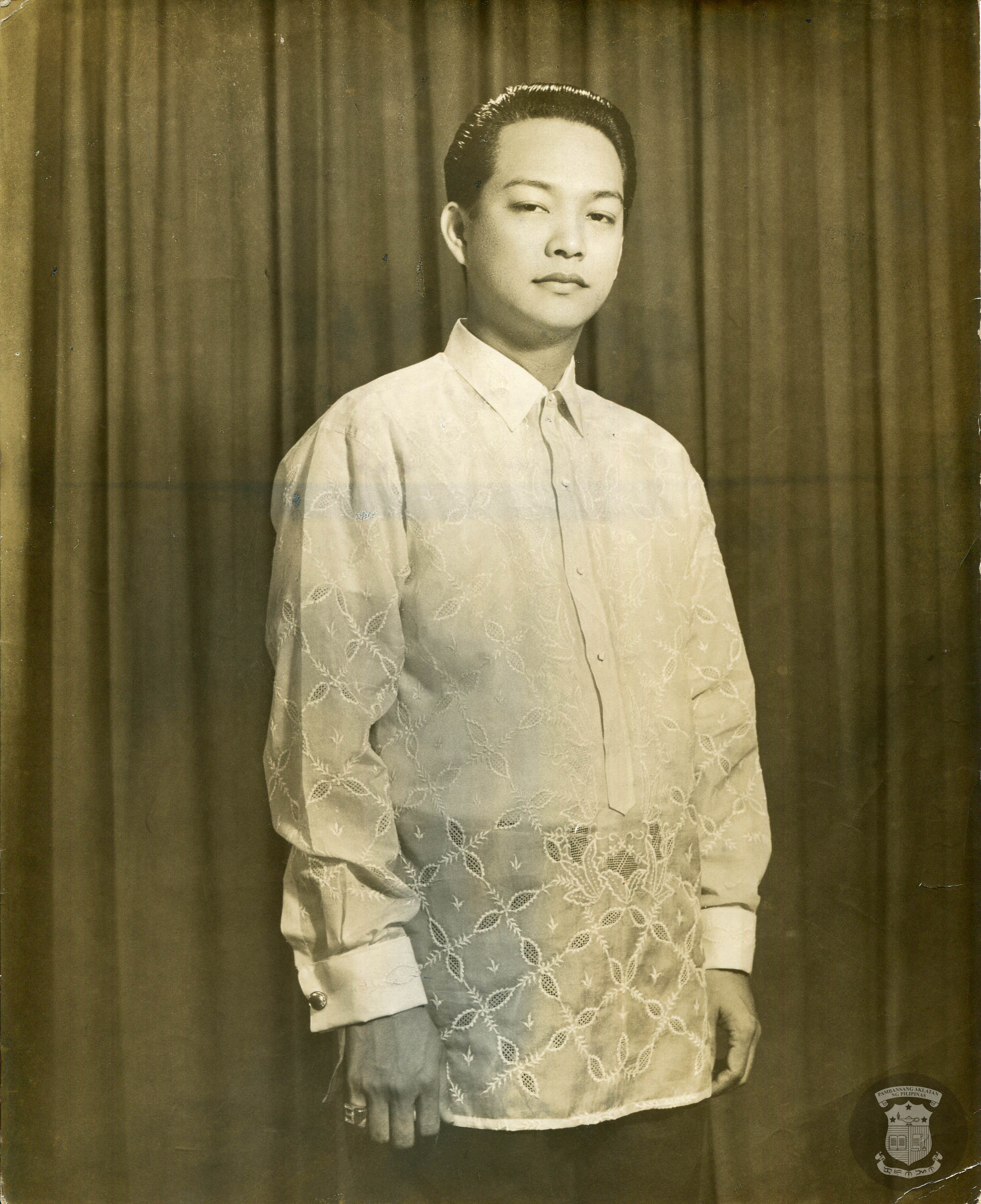
Maceda as a senator in 1972

=== First term: 1971–1972 ===
During the 1971 midterm elections, Maceda was only one out of three senators elected under the Nacionalista banner of then-President Ferdinand Marcos. He took office on December 30, 1971. In 1972, Maceda's bill granting protection to real estate buyers on installment basis was the only bill signed into law before Martial Law was proclaimed. The bill is known as the Maceda Law. His term was supposed to have ended on December 30, 1977.

== Break with Marcos, exile, and opposition leadership (1972–1986) ==
Maceda went into exile after breaking with President Marcos over the Martial Law declaration. His escape involved covertly boarding a banca at the Manila bay breakwater, whose armed boatman took him to a ship which then brought him to Hong Kong, whereupon he made his way to the United States.

He eventually became the adviser of Senator Benigno Aquino Jr. Following Aquino's assassination, he became one of the leaders of the opposition during the 1984 Batasang Pambansa Campaign and the 1986 snap presidential election.

== Return to the Senate (1987–1998) ==
=== Second Senate term (1987–1992) ===
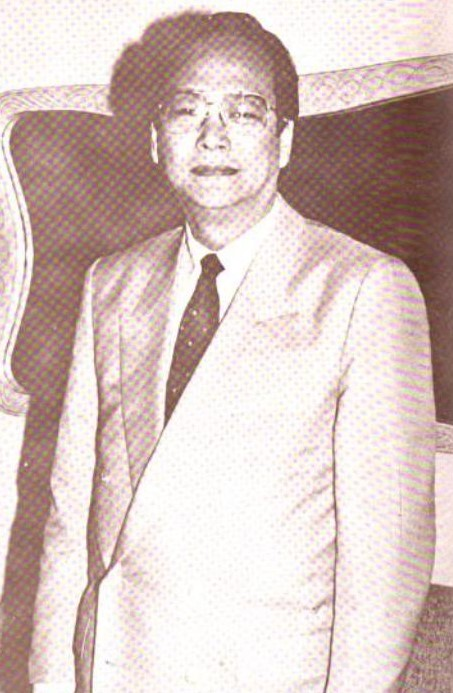
Maceda as a senator, photograph released by the Philippine Congress, c. 1988

When Corazon Aquino was installed as President of the Philippines, he was appointed to head the Ministry of Natural Resources. The following year he ran for the Senate on Corazon Aquino's ticket and won. He served his second term as senator from June 30, 1987, to June 30, 1992.

In January 1991, a survey organized by Senate reporters regarding the senators' overall performance was released, with Maceda receiving the most number of points.

On September 16, 1991, Maceda was among the "Magnificent 12" senators who voted against the extension of the PH-US Bases Treaty.

=== Third Senate term (1992–1998) ===
During the 1992 general elections, Senator Maceda was re-elected under the Nationalist People's Coalition, which was a faction that bolted from the Nacionalista Party, headed by former Tarlac Governor Danding Cojuangco. Placed sixth in the senatorial race, he took office for the third time and served from June 30, 1992, to June 30, 1998. In his third term, he served as senate president from 1996 to 1998.

=== Senate Presidency (1996-1998) ===
On October 10, 1996, the Senate was re-organized and Maceda was installed as Senate President succeeding Neptali A. Gonzales, Sr. In November of that year, Senate President Maceda delivered a speech denouncing the PEA-Amari Scandal – calling the same as the "grandmother of all scams". The PEA-Amari Scandal was a controversial deal involved the acquisition of 158 hectares of reclaimed land on Manila Bay that was to be converted into so-called Freedom Islands. The deal was forged as part of the Ramos administration's Manila Bay Master Development Plan (MBMDP). During this time, he was also nicknamed "Mr. Expose" by the Philippine Free Press.

=== Post-senate presidency ===
On January 26, 1998, he resigned as Senate President, citing loss of support by the majority of his fellow senators. Then Senator Neptali Gonzales, whom Maceda helped and was installed as Senate President from 1992 to 1993 and 1995 to 1996, succeeded him. Maceda became the new minority leader of the Senate. In February 1998, months before his second and last term as senator ended, Maceda ran for mayor of Manila in 1998, but lost to incumbent Mayor Lito Atienza. Senator Juan Ponce Enrile, then the Assistant Minority Leader of the Senate became the acting minority leader even though he was also running for president of the Philippines.

== Ambassadorship (1998-2001), EDSA III and later career ==
After his term in the Senate ended, Maceda was appointed Philippine Ambassador to the United States (1998–2001) by President Joseph Estrada. In the aftermath of Estrada's deposition in EDSA II in January 2001, Maceda was among the politicians who spoke against Estrada's arrest at pro-Estrada rallies in April that preceded the May 1 riots (dubbed as EDSA III) near Malacañang Palace. As a result, he was arrested on May 2 during a government crackdown, though authorities released him a few days later to the custody of his lawyer Alfredo Lazaro Jr. for health reasons.

In the 2004 elections, Maceda ran for senator under the Koalisyon ng Nagkakaisang Pilipino of presidential candidate Fernando Poe, Jr. but lost. He ran again in the 2013 elections, but lost his bid to return to the Senate. Maceda holds the distinction of being the only Filipino to have held 5 cabinet positions in his lifetime.

In 2007, he joined the Pamantasan ng Lungsod ng Maynila and became one of the professors of the PLM College of Law. He wrote a thrice-weekly column for the Philippine Star, entitled "Search for Truth", and hosted his own talk show Mr. Expose on the radio station DZRJ-AM.

== Personal life ==
Maceda became estranged from his wife Maria Azucena, popularly known as Marichu Vera-Perez of Sampaguita Pictures fame. His father-in-law was the great star builder and producer Dr. Jose Perez. His marriage to Ms. Vera-Perez produced five sons: Emmanuel, Ernesto Jr., Erwin, Edmond, and Edward. Ernesto Jr. is a former vice mayor of Manila, while Edward is a former representative of the 4th district of Manila and Edmond is director of sustainability at Enderun Colleges and a Sustainability Consultant to Megaworld Corporation. Ernesto Maceda also has ten grandchildren.

== Death ==
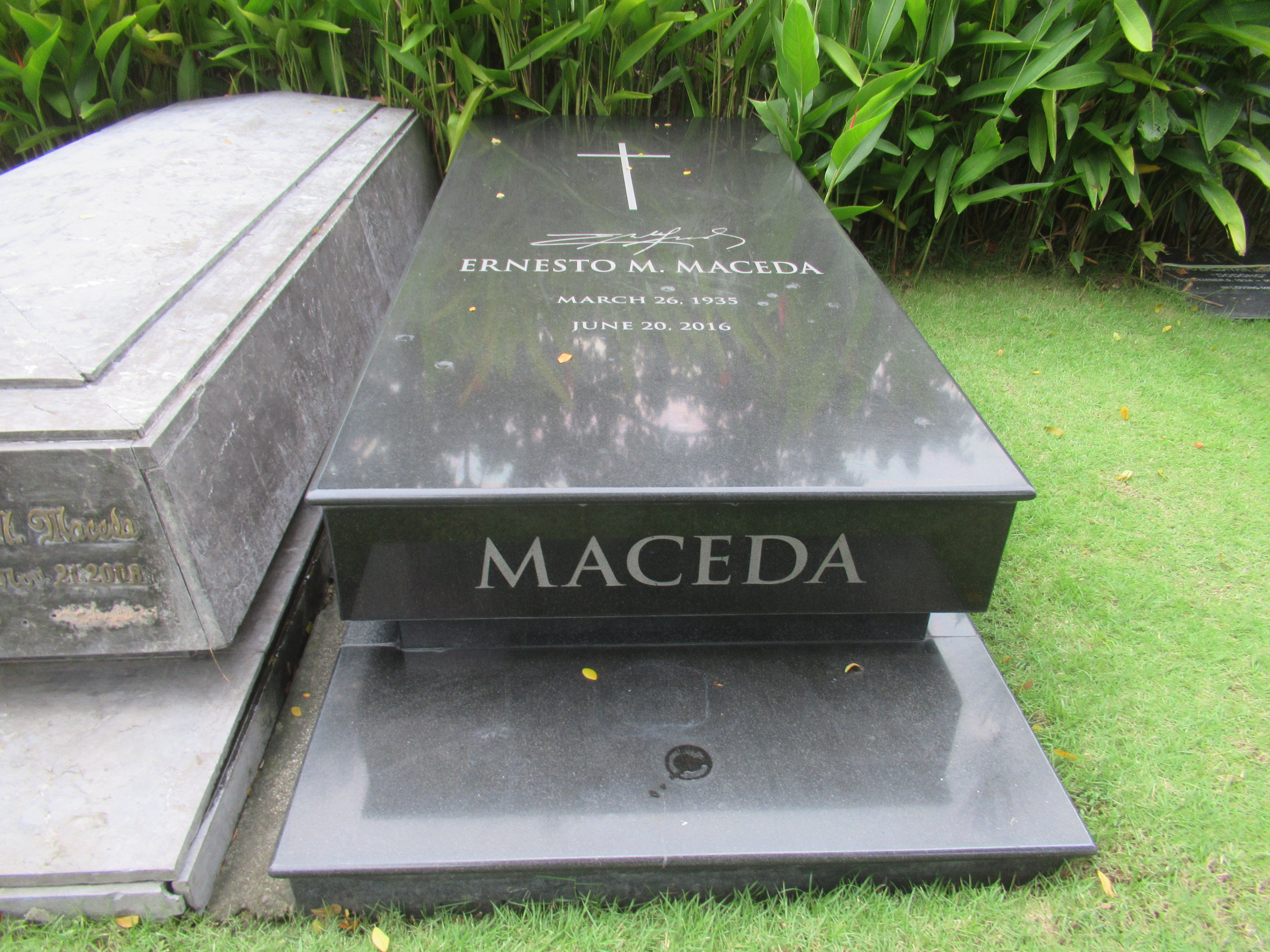
Maceda's tomb at Loyola Memorial Park, Marikina

Maceda died of multiple organ failure at St. Luke's Medical Center in Quezon City, Philippines on the night of June 20, 2016. He was aged 81. He was interred beside his parents at the Loyola Memorial Park in Marikina on June 25, 2016.

== Electoral history ==
Electoral history of Ernesto Maceda
Year	Office	Party	Votes received				Result
Year	Office	Party	Total	%	P.	Swing	Result
1971	Senator of the Philippines	Nacionalista	3,592,559	38.14%	7th	—N/a	Won
1987	Senator of the Philippines	Liberal	9,381,682	41.26%	19th	—N/a	Won
1992	Senator of the Philippines	NPC	6,820,717	28.12%	6th	—N/a	Won
2004	Senator of the Philippines	NPC	9,944,328	28.00%	14th	—N/a	Lost
2013	Senator of the Philippines	UNA	3,453,121	8.60%	23rd	—N/a	Lost
1998	Mayor of Manila	NPC	160,004	24.04%	3rd	—N/a	Lost

== External links and sources ==
- Official Website of the Philippine Senate – Sen. Ernesto Maceda, PhD
