= Sunshine Coalition =

Philippine political coalition (2001–04)

- Leader: Jose De Venecia
- Founder: Jose De Venecia
- Founded: 2001
- Dissolved: 2004
- Preceded by: Rainbow Coalition
- Political position: Big tent
- Coalition members: Lakas; Liberal; NPC (2001–2003); Nacionalista; PDP–Laban; Reporma; Aksyon; KBL; PROMDI

The Sunshine Coalition is a multi-party coalition in the House of Representatives of the Philippines composed mainly of Lakas, NPC (2001–2003), Liberal, Nacionalista, PDP–Laban, Reporma, Aksyon, KBL, and PROMDI. The coalition was led by then-House Speaker Jose De Venecia.

== History ==
After the ouster of Joseph Estrada in the presidency, Gloria Macapagal Arroyo assumed presidency, and in 2001 elections, after three years, and his presidential run defeat in 1998, former House Speaker Jose de Venecia returned to his post as speaker. He was tasked to create a model of coalition based on the formula of Rainbow Coalition, of which he is also the architect. He recruited the former members of Rainbow Coalition like Nationalist People's Coalition (NPC), Liberal Party and Nacionalista Party, with the addition of PDP–Laban, Reporma, Aksyon Demokratiko, Imee Marcos' Kilusang Bagong Lipunan (KBL), and Tomas Osmeña's Probinsya Muna Development Initiative (PROMDI). But the Laban ng Demokratikong Pilipino (LDP) stayed on the Estrada's side.

In 2003, after the failure of impeachment filing in the House against Chief Justice Hilario Davide, rumors speculated that the coalition will go to abolishment, as pro-impeachment congressmen, mainly from the NPC were disappointed in the failure of impeachment. The rumors spread, also saying that there is a faction that is lacking satisfaction on de Venecia and will challenge his speakership. NPC was later prompted to quit the coalition for the 2004 elections, and later rumored to join the opposition.

Prospero Pichay of Surigao del Sur's 1st district was recruited to be the speakership candidate to match de Venecia. After the coalition's disbandment, Congressman from Surigao del Norte's 1st district Ace Barbers proposed to create a Dawn Coalition to secure de Venecia's spot as speaker.

== See also ==
- People Power Coalition, their senate counterpart
