= PLM College of Law =

Public college in Manila, Philippines

Pamantasan ng Lungsod ng Maynila College of Law
- Type: Public
- Established: 1989
- Dean: Atty. George Erwin Garcia
- Address: Gusaling Katipunan, PLM Campus, Manila, Philippines
- Website: http://www.plm.edu.ph/

The College of Law of the Pamantasan ng Lungsod ng Maynila (PLM) in Manila, Philippines is one of the two Professional schools of the University. Its current dean is Ernesto P. Maceda Jr., former Vice Mayor and City Councilor of Manila. It is located in Gusaling Katipunan.

== Faculty ==
High-profile legal personalities have joined the College of Law teaching staff, like former Senator Ernesto Maceda in the legislation and public governance and lawyer Katrina Legarda for family law. Also part of the faculty is former Dean and Acting University President Jose M. Roy III, who served as Commissioner and Executive Director of the Preparatory Commission on Constitutional Reforms.

== Admission ==
An applicant who passes the Admission Test will be informed of the date of interview. Non-response within five days and/or his/her non-appearance will cause forfeiture of slot in the College. The Committee on Admission reserves the right to deny the admission of an applicant if the above requirements and all other admission criteria are not satisfactorily complied with.

Admission decision will be based on the result of the evaluation of all the required documents, as well as the entrance examination and the interview. The Committee on Admission shall submit to the Dean of the College its recommendation for his review and final recommendation to the President of the University. Any evidence of fraud, misrepresentation, or non-disclosure by the applicant of any information relative to the requirements shall be ground for the cancellation of his admission or enrollment.

== Curricular offering ==
- Juris Doctor (starting School Year 2009–10)
