= Manny Maceda =

Filipino-American businessman (born 1963)

- Born: 1963 (age 61–62); U.S.
- Education: Illinois Institute of Technology (BS); Massachusetts Institute of Technology (MS)
- Occupation(s): Management Consultant, Strategist
- Employer: Bain & Company
- Title: Chairman
- Spouse: Lyra Rufino
- Children: 4

Emmanuel "Manny" Maceda (born 1963) is a Filipino-American businessman. As a career management consultant, he was named worldwide managing partner of Bain & Company in November 2017 and Chairman in February 2025. Maceda is Bain & Company’s first worldwide managing partner of Asian descent.

== Early life and education ==
Manny Maceda was born in the United States and raised in the Philippines. He is the eldest son of the late Filipino politician Ernesto Maceda. He earned a bachelor's in chemical engineering from Illinois Institute of Technology, where he graduated with magna cum laude honors. He later obtained a masters degree in management from the MIT Sloan School of Management.

== Career ==
After his studies at the Illinois Institute of Technology, Maceda started his career in the engineering plastics group of DuPont in 1984. Following this he attended a Master's in Management at MIT.

During his master's at MIT he was still "unaware of the existence of the management-consulting industry." While at Sloan, he persuaded one of his role models, Jack Welch, the chairman and chief executive of General Electric Co., to speak at the school. During the speech, a man wearing a gas mask threw a grenade-like object at Welch's feet. He stopped speaking and Maceda, correctly assessing that the object wasn't a real grenade, picked it up and walked it out of the building. Sometime later, Welch invited Maceda to lunch and introduced him to two top GE executives, the head of corporate strategy and the head of plastics marketing, Jeffrey Immelt, who would later become GE's chairman and CEO. Both offered Maceda jobs, but he decided to join Bain instead.

In 1988, Maceda joined Bain as a consultant. He specializes in "full potential" transformations involving strategy, performance improvement, customer loyalty and organizational effectiveness that result in meaningful long-term increase in enterprise value. He has worked with clients across a range of industries, including financial services, industrial products, consumer products, retail, telecommunications, energy and technology.

Before being appointed as the new worldwide director, Maceda led Bain's global Full Potential Transformation practice and was a member of the firm's Management Committee, Global Operating Committee and Nominating Committee. Previously he served as chairman of Bain's Asia-Pacific region. Before this he was a global leader of the Performance Improvement and Reengineering practices and leader of the global recruiting team. Meanwhile, he also published articles, such as in the MIT World Series, and spoke at the World Economic Forum.

In November 2017, Maceda was named the successor of Bob Bechek as the worldwide managing director of Bain & Company when Bechek stepped down in March 2018. Maceda stated that he wanted to focus on the development of Bain's digital practice. Maceda stepped down from the CEO role in summer 2024.

In February 2025, Maceda was named as the successor of Orit Gadiesh as the Chairman of Bain & Company.

He is a member of the MIT Sloan North American Advisory Board.

Business positions
Preceded by Bob Bechek	President, CEO; Bain & Company; 2018–Present	Succeeded by --
Preceded by --	Chairman, Bain & Company Asia Pacific; 2007–2013	Succeeded by Dale Cottrell

== Personal life ==
Maceda is married to Lyra of the Rufino family. He and his wife and their four children currently live in San Francisco.

== Related pages ==
- Bain & Company
