= Jose de Venecia Jr. =

Filipino politician (1936–2026)

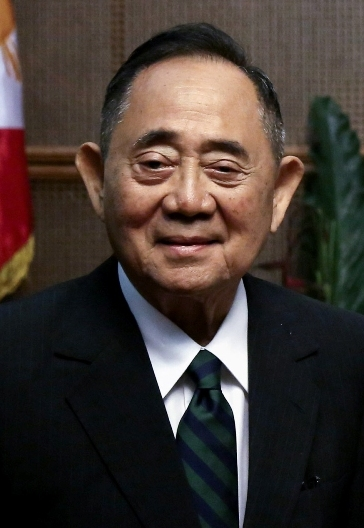
- de Venecia in 2017

17th and 21st Speaker of the Philippine House of Representatives
- In office July 23, 2001 – February 5, 2008
- Preceded by: Feliciano Belmonte Jr.
- Succeeded by: Prospero Nograles
- In office July 27, 1992 – June 30, 1998
- Preceded by: Ramon Mitra Jr.
- Succeeded by: Manny Villar

Member of the House of Representatives from Pangasinan
- In office June 30, 2001 – June 30, 2010
- Preceded by: Benjamin Lim
- Succeeded by: Gina de Venecia
- Constituency: 4th district
- In office June 30, 1987 – June 30, 1998
- Preceded by: Antonio Villar Sr.
- Succeeded by: Benjamin Lim
- Constituency: 4th district
- In office December 30, 1969 – September 23, 1972
- Preceded by: Jack Laureano Soriano
- Succeeded by: District abolished (next held by Antonio Bengson III)
- Constituency: 2nd district

Personal details
- Born: December 26, 1936 Dagupan, Pangasinan, Commonwealth of the Philippines
- Died: February 10, 2026 (aged 89)
- Resting place: Libingan ng mga Bayani, Taguig, Metro Manila
- Party: Lakas (2020–2026)
- Other political affiliations: Independent (2008–2020); Lakas (I) (1991–2008); LDP (1988–1991); Lakas ng Bansa (1987–1988); Liberal (1965–1987)
- Spouse(s): Victoria Perez (divorced); Georgina Vera-Perez
- Children: 6, including Christopher
- Education: Ateneo de Manila University (BA)
- Occupation: Politician
- Profession: Journalist

Jose Claveria de Venecia Jr. (Tagalog pronunciation: [vɛˈnɛʃa]; December 26, 1936 – February 10, 2026), also known as JDV, Joe De V or Manong Joe, was a Filipino politician and journalist who served as Speaker of the House of Representatives of the Philippines from 1992 to 1998 and from 2001 to 2008. A member of Lakas–CMD, he ran for president in the 1998 election, but lost to Vice President Joseph Estrada, finishing second among 11 candidates.

Beginning in 1987, de Venecia was elected to six terms as a representative of the 4th district of Pangasinan. He served as Speaker of the House throughout the Ninth, Tenth, Twelfth and Thirteenth Congresses of the Philippines. He had served for more than a year as the House Speaker of the Fourteenth Congress when on February 5, 2008, 174 representatives, or a considerable majority of members of the House, voted to remove de Venecia as speaker. He was the first Filipino to hold the speakership five times in separate terms.

== Early life and career ==
De Venecia was born in Dagupan, Pangasinan on December 26, 1936 to Judge Jose R. de Venecia Sr. and Casimira Villamil Clavería. De Venecia came from an influential political family. His grandfather, Guillermo de Venecia was the municipal president (now known as mayor) from 1916 to 1918 and from 1925 to 1926. In 1947, he finished his elementary studies at the Dagupan Elementary School where he was accelerated by one year. He completed his secondary education at the De La Salle College High School, and finished Journalism at the Ateneo de Manila in 1955.

As a businessman, de Venecia pioneered overseas contract work for Filipinos where he was one of the first Philippine prime contractors in the Middle East and North Africa in the mid-1970s. He hired 51,000 Filipinos for his companies and engaged in port operations in Saudi Arabia, agriculture in Africa, and mass housing and oil exploration in the United Arab Emirates. His Middle East initiative was followed and later led to the employment of millions of Filipinos. In the 1970s, he initiated an oil and gas exploration program that led to the first oil and gas strikes in offshore Palawan. He was elected president of the Petroleum Association of the Philippines.

De Venecia's first stint in politics was in 1961, when he became a spokesperson for presidential candidate Diosdado Macapagal. During the presidency of Ferdinand Marcos, De Venecia was in the diplomatic service as Minister-Economic Counselor from 1966 to 1969. He was also posted to the Philippine embassy in South Vietnam as press and economic counselor. He conceived and implemented the historic dollar-remittance program for overseas Filipino workers worldwide.

He ran and won as congressman of the 2nd district of Pangasinan from 1969 to 1972. He was one of the Ten Outstanding Congressmen before martial law in the Philippines. After the restoration of the House of Representatives in 1987, he ran and won as congressman of the fourth district of Pangasinan.

He was one of the co-founders of the Radio Philippines Network.

== Speaker of the House (1992–1998) ==
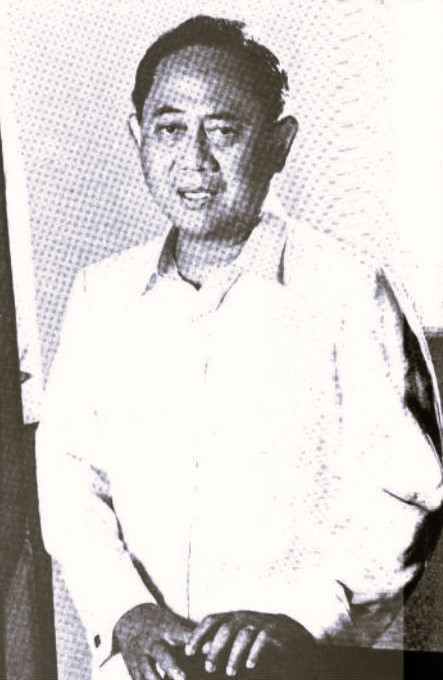
De Venecia official portrait during the 8th Congress.

After Defense Secretary Fidel Ramos failed to win the Laban ng Demokratikong Pilipino (LDP) presidential nomination, Ramos recruited de Venecia to form a brand new party, Partido Lakas ng Tao. He initiated the move to unite the National Union of Christian Democrats (NUCD), a cluster of the Progressive Party led by former Foreign Affairs Secretary Raul Manglapus, and the Union of Muslim Democrats of the Philippines, and Lakas to make it a dominant party.

That same year, he was re-elected as congressman. Since Ramos got a low plurality in the election, De Venecia created a Rainbow Coalition, converging political parties that include the LDP, NPC, Lakas–NUCD, and other minor parties to make a solid majority in the House, which made him elected Speaker of the House of Representatives. He was reelected as congressman and speaker in 1995.

=== Peace envoy ===
As Ramos' peace envoy, Speaker De Venecia reached out to insurgent groups Moro National Liberation Front (MNLF) secessionists in Mindanao, the RAM-SFP-YOU military rebels, and the Communist Party of the Philippines which operates the New People's Army (NPA). He crossed Africa's Sahara Desert twice to meet the Libyan leader Muammar al-Gaddafi and MNLF Chairman Nur Misuari and assisted in forging a peace agreement at Tripoli in 1976. His persuasion of Misuari to accept autonomy led to the signing of the peace pact on September 2, 1996.

Way back in 1992, De Venecia began secret talks with leaders of the military rebels, led by Commodore Calajate, Gen. Abenina, and Col. Honasan, which led to a ceasefire in December of that year and a final peace agreement in 1995. In April 1997, De Venecia journeyed to the Netherlands to meet with self-exiled leaders of the National Democratic Front and New People's Army led by Jose Maria Sison and Luis Jalandoni. He was the first Christian leader to enter Mindanao's Camp Abubakar mountains in November 1997 and open breakthrough peace negotiations with Hashim Salamat, Chairman of the Moro Islamic Liberation Front (MILF), and military Commander Murad.

=== 1998 presidential election ===
In 1998, the dominant party Lakas–NUCD–UMDP held a convention to select Ramos' successor as titular president and candidate for the May 11 election. A long list of candidates was trimmed and led to a choice between De Venecia and then National Defense Secretary Renato de Villa. Though De Villa was seen as the frontrunner, De Venecia won the convention vote and like what Ramos did in 1992, De Villa bolted from the party to form a new one called Partido Reporma.

De Venecia garnered the second highest number of votes in a field of 11 candidates, though he was far behind the winner, Joseph Estrada. After he lost his bid, he departed from media attention and political limelight. In one of his interviews, De Venecia said that he was depressed and took several months to recover.

== Reentry to the politics ==
De Venecia reemerged on New Year's Day of 2001 calling for a smooth transition of power to the Vice President. Estrada belittled de Venecia's statements, however, the former was ousted January 20 of that year by a four-day people power uprising.

== Speaker of the House (2001–2008) ==
In the 2001 election, he won without opposition as congressman of the 4th District of Pangasinan. He was reelected overwhelmingly by the House, and was voted by some critical left-wing partylist representatives. He formed alliance with other political parties to form Sunshine Coalition. In 2003, he received an unexpected high commendation from the public when he accepted the Supreme Court ruling that junked the petition for the impeachment of the Chief Justice Hilario Davide. In the 2004 election, he became instrumental in Gloria Macapagal Arroyo's campaign victory as president. He also won by a landslide as congressman and was reelected as speaker for the fourth time.

=== NBN-ZTE scandal ===
On July 10, 2007, De Venecia's supporters opposed secret balloting by the majority coalition to select the speaker of the House of Representatives in the Fourteenth Congress. Rep. Eduardo Zialcita of Parañaque, said the House is not a "secret society." Meanwhile, Sorsogon Rep. Jose Solis accused De Venecia's son, Jose de Venecia III, of questioning a $330 million broadband connection deal between the Philippine government and Chinese firm ZTE. Solis hit De Venecia III for desiring to have his Amsterdam Holdings, Inc. (AHI) get the deal (which will connect national government agencies to local government units through the Internet and save government up to P3 billion in telephone expenses every year). Solis further claimed that AHI is a "veritable mom's-and-pop's enterprise with a reported paid-up capital of only P650,000.

=== Re-election as Speaker ===
On July 23, 2007, 159 lawmakers picked De Venecia as House Speaker for 5th time—after the House commenced at 2:17 pm, a roll-call vote for the position. De Venecia was the lone nominee, while his opponent, Cebu Rep. Pablo Garcia, was not nominated. Iloilo Rep. Arthur Defensor Sr. was elected Majority Leader while San Juan Rep. Ronaldo Zamora was elected minority leader. The 14th Congress of the House of Representatives is composed of 240 lawmakers, 21 of whom are party-list representatives.

=== Removal as Speaker ===
On January 31, 2008, Kabalikat ng Malayang Pilipino (KAMPI) announced that 134 congressmen signed a manifesto of "loss of confidence" versus Speaker Jose de Venecia Jr. Camarines Sur's 2nd district Rep. Luis Villafuerte, KAMPI president, said the successor should be Davao City's 1st district representative Prospero Nograles.

During the regular session on February 4, 2008, Palawan Representative Abraham Kahlil Mitra moved that the position of House Speaker be declared vacant. Before the motion was submitted to a vote, De Venecia delivered a speech before the House where he criticized President Gloria Macapagal Arroyo and alleged that her government was behind the move to oust him from the speakership. He recounted the times he had stood to defend President Arroyo, and said, "It pains me grievously to hurt the President and to hurt the First Family because I have invested so much more than any of you in this chamber to help the President become Vice President, become President…." Shortly after his remarks, de Venecia acknowledged to reporters: "I will join the opposition to denounce corruption in this administration. I will join the battle against corruption."

During his speech at the House plenary, De Venecia said that three military generals visited his house. They were accompanied by Raul Lambino.

General Santos, commanding general of the Philippine Army, commander of the United Nations Forces in East Timor, came to my house accompanied by Attorney Raul Lambino, who is his friend, and who is also my friend, and he said, 'Mr. Speaker you and your son [should] keep quiet because they want to kill you and I know they can kill you and I know they have killed other people.

De Venecia's son reported the incident to the Makati police. The Speaker, meanwhile, wrote a letter to President Arroyo to ask her to do something about the threat on their lives.

My son reported this to the Makati Police and in the same day following, General Santos, such a respected general of the Armed Forces, changed his tune and said he never said such a thing. How could he say that he never said such a thing when he came to my house to ask me to listen to his story, accompanied by Raul Lambino in the presence of my son Joey, in the presence of my wife Gina.

The Speaker said he asked President Gloria Macapagal Arroyo in a letter to "please do something."

So I wrote a letter to President Gloria Macapagal Arroyo. Dear Madam President, I write to you because General Santos came to see me and said to me, and confessed to me that they wanted to kill myself and my son and that they have killed other people. I asked you because these three generals belonged to your government, please do something. That was late October of last year. Do you think up to know Malacanang has lifted a finger to arrest or to investigate these attempts on my life and of my son?

"It's simple arrogance. Just plain arrogance that Malacañang and the people of the Palace are above the law. Someday this can happen to you," he said. The speech was delivered hours after Palawan's 2nd district Rep. Abraham Kahlil Mitra, an ally of Davao City Rep. Prospero Nograles, moved the speaker's position be declared vacant.

== Post-speakership ==
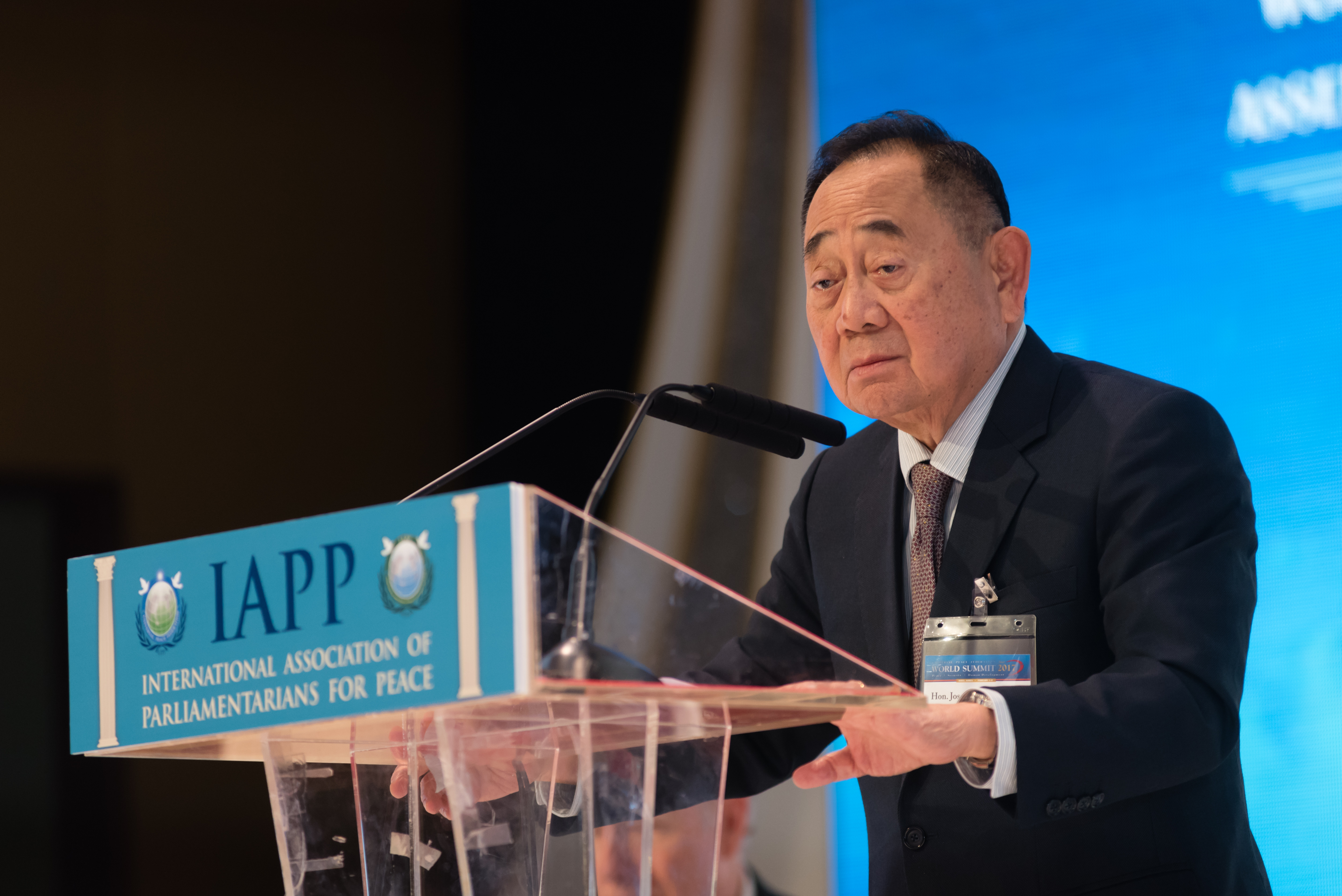
de Venecia addressing the International Association of Parliamentarians for Peace session at the International Leadership Conference by Universal Peace Federation help in Seoul in 2017

Shortly after midnight, February 5, 2008, 174 members of the House voted in favor of the motion to declare the position of House Speaker as vacant, removing de Venecia from his position. 35 members voted against the motion while 16 members abstained. Prospero Nograles was elected as the new House Speaker.

On March 10, 2008, De Venecia resigned his post as president of Lakas–CMD. In 2010, he travelled to the United States to speak to Filipino people who were living and working there. He mentioned that overseas workers sent over US$18 billion home every year and said about this: "This is your contribution. You must be aware of it, you should be proud of it. This is why we call you the heroes and heroines of the Filipino people."

In April 2017, De Venecia was appointed by President Rodrigo Duterte as Special Envoy for Inter-Cultural Dialogue. The Department of Foreign Affairs said that as special envoy, De Venecia would serve to advise the administration on policies regarding cultural diversity and citizen participation under the UNESCO declaration.

De Venecia joined the second incarnation of Lakas–CMD in 2020.

== Performance rating ==
On January 7, 2008, the Social Weather Stations (November 30 to December 3, 2007) survey stated that Speaker Jose de Venecia's performance rating was 37% satisfied and 37% dissatisfied, or net +1, having been in single digits since December 2004.

== Personal life ==
De Venecia married Victoria Perez, the daughter of Eugenio Pérez, who served as Speaker of the House of Representatives from 1946 to 1953. Together, they had four children: Alexandra (Sandra), Leslie, Vivian, and Jose III (Joey). Their marriage, ended in a divorce, and Perez now lives in Albany, New York.

De Venecia then married Georgina Vera-Perez, daughter of a film producer. They had two children: Christopher and Kristina Casimira (KC). Georgina, also known as Manay Gina, was previously married to construction manager Felipe Cruz with whom she had two children. The former host of a television drama series, she is currently a social worker and a radio host.

On December 17, 2004, a fire originating from Christmas tree lights gutted de Venecia's house in Dasmariñas Village, Makati. His 16-year-old daughter KC died of suffocation after being trapped inside the house. KC's remains were cremated and her ashes were buried at the Santuario de San Antonio chapel in Makati.

== Death ==
On February 10, 2026, De Venecia died at the age of 89. His funeral was first held at the Heritage Memorial Park in Taguig from February 11 to 13, and then at the Annunciation of the Lord Parish in Bonuan Gueset, Dagupan, from February 14 to 15. A necrological service for him was held at the Batasang Pambansa on February 16. His remains were returned to the Heritage Memorial Park for a funeral until February 17, followed by his interment at the Libingan ng mga Bayani on February 18.

== Memorials and legacy ==
In January 2025, Speaker Martin Romualdez led the opening ceremony of the "Jose de Venecia Jr. Building and Museum" at the Batasang Pambansa Complex.

House of Representatives of the Philippines
Preceded by Jack Soriano	Representative, 2nd district of Pangasinan; 1969–1972	Vacant Position abolished Title next held by Antonio Bengson III
Recreated Title last held by Antonio Villar Sr.	Representative, 4th district of Pangasinan; 1987–1998	Succeeded by Benjamin Lim
Preceded by Ramon Mitra Jr.	Speaker of the House of Representatives; 1992–1998	Succeeded by Manny Villar
Preceded by Benjamin Lim	Representative, 4th district of Pangasinan; 2001–2010	Succeeded by Gina de Venecia
Preceded by Feliciano Belmonte, Jr.	Speaker of the House of Representatives; 2001–2008	Succeeded by Prospero Nograles
Party political offices
New political party	President of Lakas-CMD; 1991–2008	Succeeded by Prospero Nograles
Preceded by Fidel V. Ramos	Lakas-CMD nominee for President of the Philippines; 1998	Succeeded by Gloria Macapagal Arroyo
