= Giselle Lazaro-Maceda =

Filipino dermatologist and politician (born 1970)

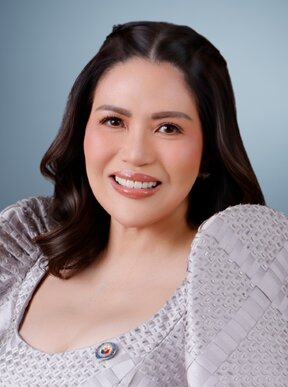
- Official portrait, 2026

Member of the Philippine House of Representatives from Manila's 4th congressional district
- Incumbent
- Assumed office June 30, 2025
- Preceded by: Edward Maceda

Personal details
- Born: Giselle Mary Serrano Lazaro; August 6, 1970 (age 56)
- Party: NPC (2025–present); Asenso Manileño (local party; 2024–present)
- Spouse: Edward Maceda (m. 2017)
- Education: University of Santo Tomas (M.D.)
- Occupation: Dermatologist, politician

Giselle Mary Lazaro-Maceda (born Giselle Mary Serrano Lazaro; August 6, 1970) is a Filipino dermatologist and politician. She is serving as representative of the 4th District of Manila in the House of Representatives of the Philippines since 2025.

== Political career ==
In 2025, Maceda was elected as representative for fourth district of Manila, succeeding her husband who was term-limited.

== Personal life ==
She is married to Edward Maceda, who had served as representative for fourth district of Manila from 2016 to 2025. The couple wed on January 21, 2017, at Sampaguita Gardens, Quezon City.

== Election results ==
=== 2025 ===
Candidate	Party	Votes	%
Giselle Lazaro-Maceda	Asenso Manileño	54,446	41.75
Joel T. Villanueva	Aksyon Demokratiko	35,651	27.34
Luisito Chua	Independent	32,937	25.26
Trisha Bonoan-David	Independent	7,371	5.65
Total		130,405	100.00
Asenso Manileño gain from Nationalist People's Coalition			

== See also ==
- List of female members of the House of Representatives of the Philippines
