= Nene Vera-Perez =

Filipino film producer

- Born: Azucena Honrado Vera; May 22, 1917; Camalig, Albay, Philippine Islands
- Died: May 15, 2014 (aged 96); Quezon City, Philippines
- Resting place: Manila Memorial Park – Sucat, Paranaque, Philippines
- Occupations: Media executive; film producer
- Spouse: Jose Roxas Perez (m. 1941; died 1975)
- Children: 7 (including Marichu Maceda and Gina de Venecia)
- Parents: José O. Vera (father); Dolores Honrado (mother)

Azucena "Nene" Honrado Vera-Perez was a Filipino film producer who was part of Sampaguita Pictures.

== Early life ==
Azucena "Nene" Vera was born on May 22, 1917, in Camalig, Albay to José O. Vera and Dolores Honrado. Vera attended the University of Santo Tomas prior to the onset of World War II and pursued a degree in chemistry.

== Career ==
Her father José O. Vera would entrust Sampaguita Pictures to her husband Jose Roxas Perez in the 1950s. She would help her husband manage the production studio. Under her husband's watch the studio produced 300 films. In 1980, Vera would take over as Sampaguita's president after the death of her mother. The studio helped produced actresses such as Gloria Romero, Susan Roces, Amalia Fuentes, and Gina Pareño.

== Death ==
Vera-Perez died on May 14, 2014, at St. Luke's Medical Center in Quezon City due to pneumonia.

== Personal life ==
Vera-Perez was married to Jose Roxas Perez. They first met when both were students at the University of Santo Tomas. Perez was a medicine student They had seven children. They got married December 10, 1941, amidst World War II and two days after the Japanese invasion of the Philippines.
