= Orit Gadiesh =

Israeli-American corporate strategist

- אורית גדיש
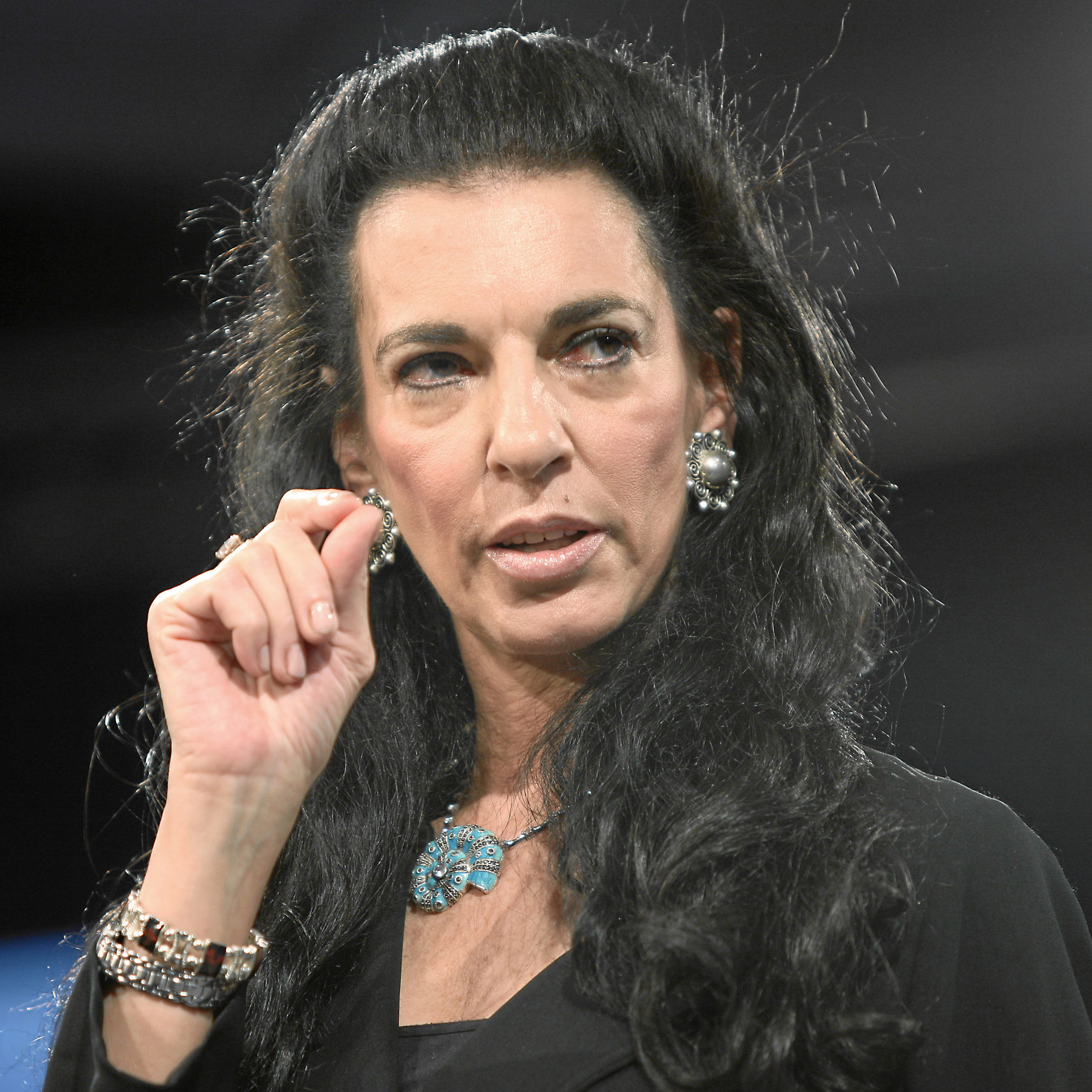
- Gadiesh in 2010
- Born: Orit Grunfeld; January 31, 1951 (age 75); Haifa, Israel
- Citizenship: Israeli; United States
- Education: Hebrew University of Jerusalem (BA); Harvard University (MBA)
- Occupation: Management consultant
- Employer: Chairman of Bain & Company
- Spouse: Grenville Byford

Orit Gadiesh (Hebrew: אורית גדיש; born January 31, 1951) is an Israeli-American corporate strategist and Chairman of management consulting firm Bain & Company since 1993.

== Biography ==
Gadiesh was born Orit Grunfeld in Haifa, Israel, in 1951, to a Berlin-born Israel Defense Forces Colonel Falk Gadiesh (né Grunfeld) and his Ukrainian-born wife Pninah, a nurse. Her family changed the surname Grunfeld to its Hebrew equivalent Gadiesh after requested by David Ben-Gurion. She completed her compulsory IDF service in the office of the Deputy Chief of Staff Ezer Weizman. She then studied at Hebrew University of Jerusalem, graduating in 1975 with a bachelor's degree in psychology. Gadiesh graduated from Harvard Business School in 1977 in the top 5 percent of her class (Baker Scholar) and was awarded the Brown prize for the most outstanding marketing student. She was elected chairman of Bain & Company in July 1993 and has been at the helm for over 30 years.

Forbes has listed her among the world's 100 most powerful women four times since 2004. A frequent business speaker and journal contributor, Gadiesh is co-author of Lessons from Private Equity Any Company Can Use.

Gadiesh is a member of the Board of Trustees of the World Economic Forum. In May 2020, Gadish was elected as a term member of MIT Corporation.
