= José O. Vera =

Filipino politician (1888–1956)

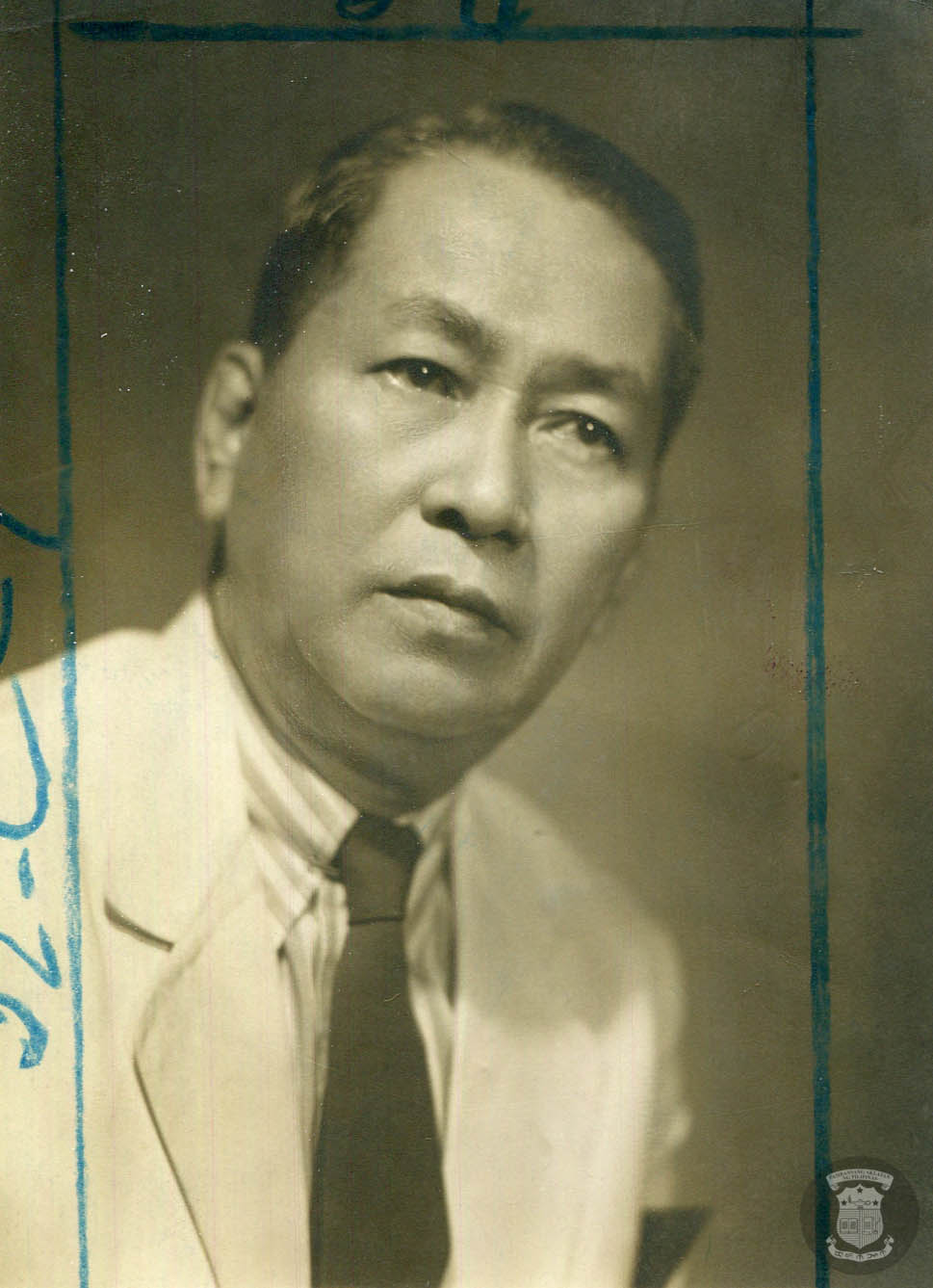

Senator of the Philippines
- In office May 25, 1946 – December 30, 1949
- Constituency: At-large
- In office August 18, 1931 – September 16, 1935
- Preceded by: Juan B. Alegre
- Succeeded by: Position abolished
- Constituency: 6th district
- In office June 2, 1925 – June 2, 1931
- Preceded by: Vicente de Vera
- Succeeded by: Juan B. Alegre
- Constituency: 6th district

11th Governor of Albay
- In office October 16, 1919 – October 16, 1922
- Preceded by: Timoteo Alcala
- Succeeded by: Leoncio Imperial

Member of the Philippine House of Representatives from Albay's 2nd district
- In office 1916–1919
- Preceded by: Mariano A. Locsin (as Assemblyman)
- Succeeded by: Pedro Martínez Jimeno

Personal details
- Born: November 15, 1888 Pandan, Albay, Captaincy General of the Philippines
- Died: August 15, 1956 (aged 67) Quezon City, Philippines
- Party: Nacionalista
- Relatives: Marichu Maceda (granddaughter); Gina de Venecia (granddaughter); Edward Maceda (great-grandson); Christopher de Venecia (great-grandson)

José Olfinas Vera (November 15, 1888 – August 15, 1956) was a Filipino politician, judge and film studio executive.

Vera served as Representative from Albay's 2nd district from 1916 to 1919, Governor of Albay from 1919 to 1922, and Senator of the Philippines from the 6th district during the 7th to 10th Legislatures (1925–1935) and for the whole nation in the 1st Congress (1946–1949). He served in the seventh branch of the Court of First Instance of Manila as judge ad interim. Beyond politics, he was also the head of the production studio Sampaguita Pictures which he handed over to his son-in-law Jose R. Perez in the 1950s.

In 2004, the Quezon City Council honored Vera by renaming Granada Street, which runs through the old Sampaguita Pictures estate, after him.

== Early life and education ==
Vera was born November 15, 1888 in Pandan, which was then part of Albay province. He studied at Colegio de San Juan de Letran then took up law at Escuela de Derecho, garnering second place in the bar in 1913 after peer Manuel Roxas.
