= Dolores Vera =

Filipino film studio executive

- Born: Dolores Morato Honrado
- Died: May 15, 1980
- Other name: Mommy Vera
- Occupation: Media executive
- Spouse: José O. Vera (died 1956)
- Children: Nene Vera
- Awards: Presidential Medal of Merit and Citation

Dolores Morato Honrado Vera was a Filipino film studio executive.

== Career ==
She would head Sampaguita Pictures as its president and executive producer from 1956, the death of her husband José O. Vera. She would introduce a "morality clause" for Sampaguita's contract stars where signees had to adhere to moral standards or risk suspension or expulsion. She would be awarded the Presidential Medal of Merit and Citation from President Carlos P. Garcia for her work.

== Death ==
Vera died on May 15, 1980. Her daughter Nene Vera-Perez would take over Sampaguita.

== Personal life ==
Vera was married to José O. Vera who was also a Senate of the Philippines.
