= Manila's 4th congressional district =

Legislative district of the Philippines

- Constituency for the House of Representatives of the Philippines
- Boundary of Manila's 4th congressional district in Manila
- Location of Manila within Metro Manila
- City: Manila
- Region: Metro Manila
- Population: 388,305 (2020)
- Electorate: 162,767 (2020)
- Major settlements: Sampaloc
- Area: 5.14 km^{2} (1.98 sq mi)

Current constituency
- Created: 1949
- Representative: Giselle Lazaro-Maceda
- Political party: NPC; Asenso Manileño
- Congressional bloc: Majority

Manila's 4th congressional district is one of the six congressional districts of the Philippines in the city of Manila. It has been represented in the House of Representatives of the Philippines since 1949. The district consists of barangays 395 to 586 in the northern Manila district of Sampaloc bordering Quezon City. It is currently represented in the 20th Congress by Giselle Lazaro-Maceda of the Nationalist People's Coalition and Asenso Manileño.

Previously from 1949 to 1972, the district encompassed the southern Manila districts of Ermita, Intramuros, Malate, Paco, Pandacan, Port Area, and Santa Ana, which also includes the present-day San Andres. The current configuration took effect after the restoration of the Congress in 1987, when the aforementioned districts were reapportioned to the new fifth and sixth districts, respectively, while the fourth district was reapportioned to encompass Sampaloc.

== Representation history ==
#	Image	Member	Term of office		Congress	Party	Electoral history	Constituent LGUs
#	Image	Member	Start	End	Congress	Party	Electoral history	Constituent LGUs
=== Manila's 4th district for the House of Representatives of the Philippines ===
District created June 18, 1949.
1		Hermenegildo Atienza	December 30, 1949	February 9, 1952	2nd	Liberal	Redistricted from the 2nd district and re-elected in 1949. Election annulled after an election protest.	1949–1972; Ermita, Intramuros, Malate, Paco, Pandacan, Port Area, Santa Ana
2		Gavino Viola Fernando	February 9, 1952	December 30, 1953	2nd	Nacionalista	Declared winner of 1949 elections.	1949–1972; Ermita, Intramuros, Malate, Paco, Pandacan, Port Area, Santa Ana
3		Augusto S. Francisco	December 30, 1953	December 30, 1961	3rd	Nacionalista	Elected in 1953.	1949–1972; Ermita, Intramuros, Malate, Paco, Pandacan, Port Area, Santa Ana
3		Augusto S. Francisco	December 30, 1953	December 30, 1961	4th	Nacionalista	Re-elected in 1957.	1949–1972; Ermita, Intramuros, Malate, Paco, Pandacan, Port Area, Santa Ana
4		Justo L. Albert	December 30, 1961	December 30, 1965	5th	Liberal	Elected in 1961.	1949–1972; Ermita, Intramuros, Malate, Paco, Pandacan, Port Area, Santa Ana
5		Pablo V. Ocampo	December 30, 1965	September 23, 1972	6th	Nacionalista	Elected in 1965.	1949–1972; Ermita, Intramuros, Malate, Paco, Pandacan, Port Area, Santa Ana
5		Pablo V. Ocampo	December 30, 1965	September 23, 1972	7th	Nacionalista	Re-elected in 1969. Removed from office after imposition of martial law.	1949–1972; Ermita, Intramuros, Malate, Paco, Pandacan, Port Area, Santa Ana
District dissolved into the nineteen-seat Region IV's at-large district for the Interim Batasang Pambansa, followed by the six-seat Manila's at-large district for the Regular Batasang Pambansa.
District re-created February 2, 1987.
6		Ramon Bagatsing Jr.	June 30, 1987	June 30, 1998	8th	UNIDO	Elected in 1987.	1987–present Sampaloc (Barangays 395–586)
6		Ramon Bagatsing Jr.	June 30, 1987	June 30, 1998	8th	LDP	Elected in 1987.	1987–present Sampaloc (Barangays 395–586)
6		Ramon Bagatsing Jr.	June 30, 1987	June 30, 1998	9th	LDP	Re-elected in 1992.	1987–present Sampaloc (Barangays 395–586)
6		Ramon Bagatsing Jr.	June 30, 1987	June 30, 1998	10th	LDP	Re-elected in 1995.	1987–present Sampaloc (Barangays 395–586)
7		Rodolfo C. Bacani	June 30, 1998	June 30, 2007	11th	Liberal	Elected in 1998.	1987–present Sampaloc (Barangays 395–586)
7		Rodolfo C. Bacani	June 30, 1998	June 30, 2007	12th	Liberal	Re-elected in 2001.	1987–present Sampaloc (Barangays 395–586)
7		Rodolfo C. Bacani	June 30, 1998	June 30, 2007	13th	Liberal	Re-elected in 2004.	1987–present Sampaloc (Barangays 395–586)
8		Trisha Bonoan-David	June 30, 2007	June 30, 2016	14th	Lakas	Elected in 2007.	1987–present Sampaloc (Barangays 395–586)
8		Trisha Bonoan-David	June 30, 2007	June 30, 2016	15th	NUP	Re-elected in 2010.	1987–present Sampaloc (Barangays 395–586)
8		Trisha Bonoan-David	June 30, 2007	June 30, 2016	16th	NUP	Re-elected in 2013.	1987–present Sampaloc (Barangays 395–586)
9		Edward Maceda	June 30, 2016	June 30, 2025	17th	PMP (Asenso Manileño)	Elected in 2016.	1987–present Sampaloc (Barangays 395–586)
9		Edward Maceda	June 30, 2016	June 30, 2025	18th	PMP (Asenso Manileño)	Re-elected in 2019.	1987–present Sampaloc (Barangays 395–586)
9		Edward Maceda	June 30, 2016	June 30, 2025	19th	NPC (Asenso Manileño)	Re-elected in 2022.	1987–present Sampaloc (Barangays 395–586)
10		Giselle Lazaro-Maceda	June 30, 2025	Incumbent	20th	NPC (Asenso Manileño)	Elected in 2025.	1987–present Sampaloc (Barangays 395–586)

== Election results ==
=== 2025 ===
Candidate	Party	Votes	%
Giselle Lazaro-Maceda	Asenso Manileño	54,446	41.75
Joel T. Villanueva	Aksyon Demokratiko	35,651	27.34
Luisito Chua	Independent	32,937	25.26
Trisha Bonoan-David	Independent	7,371	5.65
Total		130,405	100.00
Asenso Manileño gain from Nationalist People's Coalition			

=== 2022 ===
2022 Philippine House of Representatives election in the 4th District of Manila
Party	Candidate	Votes	%
NPC	Edward Maceda	90,075	73.40
Independent	Trisha Bonoan-David	25,961	21.15
PRP	Christopher Gabriel	6,687	5.45
Total votes		122,723	100.00
NPC hold			

=== 2019 ===
2019 Philippine House of Representatives elections
Party	Candidate	Votes	%
PMP	Edward Maceda	63,298	60.19
Asenso	Ma. Theresa David	30,238	28.75
Independent	Christopher Gabriel	11,621	11.06
Total votes		105,157	100.00
PMP hold			

=== 2016 ===
2016 Philippine House of Representatives elections
Party	Candidate	Votes	%
Asenso	Edward Maceda	46,349	41.53
KABAKA	Don Juan Bagatsing	23,807	21.28
Independent	Science Reyes	23,650	21.25
NUP	Rosemary Leilani Bonoan	16,525	14.81
PDP–Laban	Jobe Sherwin Nkemakolam	1,263	1.13
Total votes		111,594	100.00
Asenso gain from NUP			

=== 2013 ===
2013 Philippine House of Representatives elections
Party	Candidate	Votes	%
NUP	Trisha Bonoan-David	78,026	100.00
Total votes		78,026	100.00
NUP hold			

=== 2010 ===
2010 Philippine House of Representatives elections
Party	Candidate	Votes	%
Lakas–Kampi	Trisha Bonoan-David	56,769	55.13
Liberal	Rudy Bacani	46,206	44.87
Valid ballots		102,975	94.96
Invalid or blank votes		5,464	5.04
Total votes		108,439	100.00
Lakas–Kampi hold			

== See also ==
- Legislative districts of Manila
