= Results of the 1984 Philippine parliamentary election =

The following are the results of the 1984 Philippine parliamentary election by province.

== Abra (1 seat) ==
Summary of the May 14, 1984 Regular Batasang Pambansa election results for the Province of Abra
Rank	Candidate	Party	Votes
1.	Arturo V. Barbero	KBL	40,103
2.	Jeremias Zapata	Independent	26,402
3.	Elpidio Valera	KBL	18,355
4.	Gavino Balbin	KBL	10,302
5.	Eustaqio Padaoil	KBL	7,688
6.	Demetrio Pre	UNIDO	5,099
7.	Antonio Paredes	Independent	4,876
8.	Romeo Bringas	UNIDO	4,500
9.	Leonides Benesa	Nacionalista	2,103
10.	Apolonio Enrile	Independent	433
11.	Rodolfo Bernardes	Independent	102

== Agusan del Norte (1 seat) ==
Summary of the May 14, 1984 Regular Batasang Pambansa election results for the Province of Agusan del Norte
Rank	Candidate	Party	Votes
1.	Edelmiro Amante	Nacionalista	68,267
2.	Antonio R. Tupaz	KBL	55,082
3.	Jose Gonzalez	Mindanao Alliance	23,003
4.	Sinforoso Grana	Independent	1,781

== Agusan del Sur (1 seat) ==
Summary of the May 14, 1984 Regular Batasang Pambansa election results for the Province of Agusan del Sur
Rank	Candidate	Party	Votes
1.	Democrito Plaza	KBL	54,307
2.	Ceferino Paredes Jr	Mindanao Alliance	23,088
3.	Vicente Guzman	UNIDO	15,679
4.	Marcelino Arias	Liberal	8,498
5.	Mariano Cerna Jr	Nacionalista	6,227
6.	Timoteo Lerio Sr	Independent	907
7.	Roland Doncillo	People's Party	431

== Aklan (1 seat) ==
Summary of the May 14, 1984 Regular Batasang Pambansa election results for the Province of Aklan
Rank	Candidate	Party	Votes
1.	Rafael B. Legaspi	UNIDO	68,567
2.	Sergio Rigodon	KBL	67,034
3.	Juan P. Dayyang	Nacionalista	15,084
4.	Sergio Kismundo	Independent	102

== Albay (3 seats) ==
Summary of the May 14, 1984 Regular Batasang Pambansa election results for the Province of Albay
Rank	Candidate	Party	Votes
1.	Peter A. Sabido	KBL	68,702
2.	Victor Ziga	UNIDO	57,208
3.	Pedro M. Marcellana Jr	UNIDO	49,247
4.	Carlos Imperial	KBL	46,247
5.	Dominador Aytona	UNIDO	45,196
6.	Jose Estevez	KBL	39,844
7.	Jose Balde	Bicol Saro	36,431
8.	Ismael Buban	UNIDO	33,090
9.	Teresita Flores	UNIDO	32,831
10.	Diego Obido	PDP–Laban	27,113
11.	Leoncio Opida	Bicol Saro	24,888
12.	Crispin Rayala	Liberal	22,669
13.	Honesto de Vera	Bicol Saro	18,996
14.	Vladimir Bruzola	Bicol Saro	15,321
15.	Juan M. Casil	Young Philippines	12,311
16.	Juan Sangreo	LM	9,370
17.	Antonio Betito	Independent	3,543
18.	Reynaldo Bocalbos	Independent	3,012
19.	Manuel Relorcasa	Independent	2,963

== Antique (1 seat) ==
Summary of the May 14, 1984 Regular Batasang Pambansa election results for the Province of Antique
Rank	Candidate	Party	Votes
1.	Arturo Pacificador^{a}	KBL	51,123
2.	Evelio Javier^{a}	UNIDO	50,911
3.	Antero Pagunsan	Nacionalista (Roy Wing)	11,278
4.	Andresito Fornier	Federal	755

^aThe Supreme Court proclaimed Pacificador's opponent, Evelio Javier, the real winner in 1986, but by then, Javier was dead already, having been assassinated on February 11, 1986.

== Aurora (1 seat) ==
Summary of the May 14, 1984 Regular Batasang Pambansa election results for the Province of Aurora
Rank	Candidate	Party	Votes
1.	Luis S. Etcubañez	KBL	16,111
2.	Estello T. Ong	Nacionalista	13,769
3.	Victor Bitong	UNIDO	10,205
4.	Emilio Almazan	Independent	3,788
5.	Leoncio Aragon	Independent	191

== Baguio (1 seat) ==
Summary of the May 14, 1984 Regular Batasang Pambansa election results for Baguio City
Rank	Candidate	Party	Votes
1.	Honorato Y. Aquino	UNIDO	18,346
2.	Luis L. Lardizabal	KBL (Independent)	16,785
3.	Ramon Labo Jr	KBL	14,490
4.	Jaime Bugnosen	KBL (Independent)	12,323
5.	Leonides Bautista	Independent	8,482
6.	Benjamin Rillera	Independent	3,145
7.	Galleazo Bucaycay	Nacionalista	2,540
8.	Pedro Claravall	Independent	842
9.	Teopisto Rondez	KBL	665
10.	Rafaels Wasan	Social Democratic Party (Philippines)	497
11.	George Angel	Independent	200
12.	Jeorge Manalo	Independent	155
13.	Melchor Paras	Independent	92

== Basilan (1 seat) ==
Summary of the May 14, 1984 Regular Batasang Pambansa election results for the Province of Basilan
Rank	Candidate	Party	Votes
1.	Candu I. Muarip	CCA	34,684
2.	Elnorita Tugung	Independent	16,677
3.	Kalbi Tupay	KBL	13,073
4.	Abdullah Camlian	KBL	9,086
5.	Epifanio Anoos	Nacionalista (Roy Wing)	7,854
6.	Conrado Pablo	Nacionalista (Roy Wing)	6,992

== Bataan (1 seat) ==
Summary of the May 14, 1984 Regular Batasang Pambansa election results for the Province of Bataan
Rank	Candidate	Party	Votes
1.	Antonino Roman	KBL	79,322
2.	Leonardo Roman	PDP–Laban	66,861
3.	Dominador Venegas	Nacionalista (Roy Wing)	11,173
4.	Claudio Benzon	Partido ng Bansa	696

== Batanes (1 seat) ==
Summary of the May 14, 1984 Regular Batasang Pambansa election results for the Province of Batanes
Rank	Candidate	Party	Votes
1.	Fernando C. Faberes	KBL	2,589
2.	Priscilla Yadan	UNIDO	1,004
3.	Silvino Barsana Agudo	Nacionalista	942
4.	Cesar Hidalgo	UNIDO	786
5.	Constantino Agayan	Independent	152
6.	Marcial Armando	Independent	43

== Batangas (4 seats) ==
Summary of the May 14, 1984 Regular Batasang Pambansa election results for the Province of Batangas
Rank	Candidate	Party	Votes
1.	Jose Laurel Jr.	UNIDO	433,305
2.	Hernando Perez	Nacionalista (Laurel Wing)	254,173
3.	Manuel Collantes	KBL	248,838
4.	Rafael Recto	Nacionalista (Laurel Wing)	236,601
5.	Tomas Apacible	Nacionalista (Laurel Wing)	187,202
6.	Arturo Tanco	KBL	183,629
7.	Roberto Diokno	KBL	180,006
8.	Antonio Leviste	KBL	174,521
9.	Hermilando Mandanas	Independent	156,905
10.	Expedito Leviste	KBL	153,733
11.	Fernando Cabitac Sr.	Nacionalista	149,885
12.	Jose Julian Aliling	Independent	83,002
13.	Maximiano Medalla	Independent	48,880
14.	Edgardo Mendoza	Independent	23,911
15.	Nemesio Valencia	Independent	3,001
16.	Jose Dimayuga	Independent	1,554

== Benguet (1 seat) ==
Summary of the May 14, 1984 Regular Batasang Pambansa election results for the Province of Benguet
Rank	Candidate	Party	Votes
1.	Samuel Dangwa	Nacionalista	65,153
2.	Andres Cosalan	KBL	40,082

== Bohol (3 seats) ==
Summary of the May 14, 1984 Regular Batasang Pambansa election results for the Province of Bohol
Rank	Candidate	Party	Votes
1.	Ramon M. Lapez	KBL	148,817
2.	David B. Tirol	KBL	148,326
3.	Eladio I. Chatto	KBL	119,672
4.	Natalio Castillo Jr	UNIDO	87,746
5.	Venice Borja-Agana	UNIDO	75,833
6.	Dan Lim	Independent	67,853
7.	Victor de la Cerna	Pusyon Bisaya	41,473
8.	Gaudencio Beduya	Nacionalista	39,340
9.	Abundio Gultiano	KBL (Independent)	20,062
10.	Lord Marapao	Pusyon Bisaya	14,328
11.	Heliodoro Petalcorin	Nacionalista	13,338
12.	Epifania Bolando	Nacionalista	13,009
13.	Romeo Bautista Jr	Liberal	11,222
14.	Romeo Justiniano	Liberal	10,794
15.	Eleazar Nuñez	Nacionalista	8,336
16.	Francisco Aranello	Christian Democratic Party	4,874
17.	Erique Gabriel	Independent	1,044
18.	Eduardo Rosales	Independent	663

== Bukidnon (2 seats) ==
Summary of the May 14, 1984 Regular Batasang Pambansa election results for the Province of Bukidnon
Rank	Candidate	Party	Votes
1.	Jose Maria Zubiri Jr.	KBL	61,617
2.	Lorenzo S. Dinlayan	KBL	50,692
3.	Ernesto Tabios	PDP–Laban	48,220
4.	Rube Gamolo Sr	PDP–Laban	43,220
5.	Luis Dongallo	UNIDO	25,937
6.	Wilfredo Linaac	Mindanao Alliance	20,065
7.	Severo Dignos	UNIDO	14,870
8.	Israel Damasco	Independent	3,001
9.	Mary Socorro Turrencha	Independent	2,945

== Bulacan (4 seats) ==
Summary of the May 14, 1984 Regular Batasang Pambansa election results for the Province of Bulacan
Rank	Candidate	Party	Votes
1.	Rogaciano M. Mercado	UNIDO	417,344
2.	Blas Ople	KBL	347,482
3.	Jesus S. Hipolito	KBL	333,258
4.	Teodulo C. Natividad	KBL	276,723
5.	Cesar Serapio	KBL	270,885
6.	Sixto Antonio	UNIDO	233,330
7.	Jose Cabochan	UNIDO	229,476
8.	Ranulfo David	UNIDO	219,543
9.	Carlos Serapio	Christian Democratic Party	76,688
10.	Benjamin Cruz	Independent	9,004

== Cagayan (3 seats) ==
Summary of the May 14, 1984 Regular Batasang Pambansa election results for the Province of Cagayan
Rank	Candidate	Party	Votes
1.	Juan Ponce Enrile	KBL	307,507
2.	Alfonso R. Reyno Jr.	KBL	277,384
3.	Antonio C. Carag	KBL	276,474
4.	Tito Dupaya	UNIDO	53,786
5.	Manuel T. Molina	UNIDO	33,144
6.	Eulogio C. Balao Jr.	UNIDO	28,198
7.	Elpidio Atal	Nacionalista (Roy Wing)	12,985
8.	Policropio Taguinod	Nacionalista (Roy Wing)	10,887
9.	Edgar Dupaya	Independent	8,449
10.	Alberto Manginod	Independent	5,741
11.	Mike Caronan	Independent	3,004

== Cagayan de Oro (1 seat) ==
Summary of the May 14, 1984 Regular Batasang Pambansa election results for Cagayan de Oro
Rank	Candidate	Party	Votes
1.	Nene Pimentel	PDP–Laban	64,758
2.	Pedro N. Roa	KBL	59,796
3.	Guerrero Adaza	Mindanao Alliance	2,472
4.	Galvino Jardin	Liberal	496
5.	Elsal Magnaye	Christian People's Party	205
6.	Lorenzo de la Serna	Social Democratic Party (Philippines)	130

== Caloocan City (2 seats) ==
Summary of the May 14, 1984 Regular Batasang Pambansa election results for Caloocan City
Rank	Candidate	Party	Votes
1.	Virgilio Robles	UNIDO	145,032
2.	Antonio Martinez	PDP–Laban	121,284
3.	Tomas Teodoro	KBL	104,497
4.	Alejandro Fider	KBL	96,926
5.	Flora Jacinto	Independent	11,020
6.	Carmelito Montano	Independent	5,108
7.	Eulogio Malicse	Nacionalista	3,298
8.	Benjamin Rabo	Independent	2,837
9.	Lolita Dabu	Independent	462

== Camarines Norte (1 seat) ==
Summary of the May 14, 1984 Regular Batasang Pambansa election results for the Province of Camarines Norte
Rank	Candidate	Party	Votes
1.	Roy Padilla Sr.	UNIDO	42,898
2.	Jose T. Atienza	Independent	38,901
3.	Marcial Pimentel	KBL	35,834
4.	Roger Panotes	Bicol Saro	21,840

== Camarines Sur (4 seats) ==
Summary of the May 14, 1984 Regular Batasang Pambansa election results for the Province of Camarines Sur
Rank	Candidate	Party	Votes
1.	Luis Villafuerte	UNIDO	245,922
2.	Ciriaco R. Alfelor	UNIDO	233,433
3.	Edmundo B. Cea	UNIDO	222,413
4.	Rolando R. Andaya Sr.	UNIDO	218,013
5.	Arnulfo Fuentebella	KBL	107,252
6.	Salvador Bigay	KBL	89,719
7.	Juan Triviño	KBL	67,705
8.	Lorenzo Ballecer	KBL	64,398
9.	Jesus Antonio M. Carpio Sr.	PDP–Laban	59,018
10.	Salvador Tuy Jr.	PDP–Laban	48,768
11.	Rodolfo Villanueva	PDP–Laban	45,890
12.	Eduardo Lopes	Independent	21,444
13.	Mauro Magistrado	Independent	15,754
14.	Marciano Trinidad	Independent	8,001

== Camiguin (1 seat) ==
Summary of the May 14, 1984 Regular Batasang Pambansa election results for the Province of Camiguin
Rank	Candidate	Party	Votes
1.	Jose Paul N. Neri	Independent	11,508
2.	Faustino Neri Jr	KBL	8,908
3.	Pedro Romualdo	Mindanao Alliance	7,054
4.	Dioscoro Quiblat	UNIDO	6,987
5.	Leodegario Vallar	PDP–Laban	5,014
6.	Juanito Abat	Independent	1,093

== Capiz (2 seats) ==
Summary of the May 14, 1984 Regular Batasang Pambansa election results for the Province of Capiz
Rank	Candidate	Party	Votes
1.	Enrique Belo	UNIDO	94,987
2.	Charles B. Escolin	KBL	93,024
3.	Gabriel Villareal	KBL	80,598
4.	Pedro Exmundo	Nacionalista (Roy Wing)	69,243
5.	Arturo Villanueva	Nacionalista (Roy Wing)	55,039
6.	Raul Villareal	Independent	4,120
7.	Virgilio Asis	Independent	2,980

== Catanduanes (1 seat) ==
Summary of the May 14, 1984 Regular Batasang Pambansa election results for the Province of Catanduanes
Rank	Candidate	Party	Votes
1.	Jose M. Alberto	KBL	37,847
2.	Rosita Alberto	Independent	25,884
3.	Leandro Verceles Sr.	Bicol Saro	19,966
4.	Clemente Abundo	UNIDO	1,294
5.	Silverio Tabirara	Independent	852
6.	Nellie Tarrobago-Rojas	Independent	603
7.	Luis Tayo	Independent	477
8.	Horatio Villarete	Independent	203

== Cavite (3 seats) ==
Summary of the May 14, 1984 Regular Batasang Pambansa election results for the Province of Cavite
Rank	Candidate	Party	Votes
1.	Cesar Virata	KBL	258,321
2.	Renato P. Dragon	KBL	178,629
3.	Helena Benitez	KBL (Independent)	174,777
4.	Jorge Nuñez	KBL	131,557
5.	Alfredo Gimenez	UNIDO	66,801
6.	Florentino A. Bautista	Nacionalista (Roy Wing)	56,034
7.	Fernando Campos	UNIDO	41,032
8.	Reynaldo Maraan	UNIDO	35,865
9.	Mario V. Villareal	Nacionalista (Roy Wing)	31,225
10.	Romeo B. Batino	Nacionalista (Roy Wing)	29,658
11.	Luis Espiritu	PDP–Laban	26,660
12.	Jose Ricafrente Jr	Independent	24,963
13.	Igmedio Corpin	Christian Democratic Party	14,236
14.	Franco Loyola	Independent	8,007
15.	Gaudencio Fabroa	Independent	5,987
16.	Rosalio Benig	Independent	4,008
17.	Natividad Nazareno	Independent	2,753
18.	Arturo Topacio Jr	Independent	1,009

== Cebu Province (6 seats) ==
Summary of the May 14, 1984 Regular Batasang Pambansa election results for the Province of Cebu
Rank	Candidate	Party	Votes
1.	Ramon Durano III	KBL	474,687
2.	Emerito S. Calderon	KBL	375,892
3.	Adelino Sitoy	KBL	349,318
4.	Nenita Cortes-Daluz	Panaghiusa	335,698
5.	Luisito R. Patalinjug	KBL	329,497
6.	Regalado Maambong	KBL	326,525
7.	Antonio Almirante Jr	KBL	324,002
8.	Osmundo Rama	Panaghiusa	318,659
9.	Antonio Bacaltos	Panaghiusa	316,555
10.	Ribomapil Holganza Sr.	Panaghiusa	308,256
11.	Hilario Davide Jr.	Social Democratic Party (Philippines)	305,887
12.	Casimiro Madarang Jr	Pusyon Bisaya	299,996
13.	Nazario Pacquiao	Panaghiusa	297,803
14.	Guillermo Legaspi	UNIDO	288,559
15.	Andres Flores	Panaghiusa	286,004
16.	Mariano Florido	Pusyon Bisaya	284,693
17.	Pontico Fortuna	UNIDO	257,651
18.	Oliveros Kintanar	Pusyon Bisaya	254,639
19.	Alfonso Corominas	Pusyon Bisaya	241,009
20.	Rogelio Osmeña	Independent	230,263
21.	Serafin Cabanlit	UNIDO	223,005
22.	Francisco Emilio Remotugue	Nacionalista	214,633
23.	Julian Iballe	Pusyon Bisaya	210,884
24.	Clavel Asas-Martinez	Pundok Sugbuanon	198,550
25.	Fortunato Clavano Jr	Federal	190,225
26.	Wilda Dulcero	Federal	52,044
27.	Filemon Fernandez	Independent	23,542
28.	Mariano Logarta	Independent	22,436
29.	Gaudioso Manliguez	Federal	18,997
30.	Jose Manzanares	Independent	17,548
31.	Marcelo Bacalso	Independent	15,006
32.	Buenaventura Najarro	Federal	14,659
33.	Teofanio Nuñez	Federal	12,778
34.	Lolita Pahang	Independent	9,663
35.	Juanito Recio	Independent	7,256
36.	Rosario Sabalones	Independent	5,863
37.	Rodisendo Sabanal Jr	Federal	3,993
38.	Caridad Sarmiento	Independent	793

== Cebu City (2 seats) ==
Summary of the May 14, 1984 Regular Batasang Pambansa election results for Cebu City
Rank	Candidate	Party	Votes
1.	Marcelo Fernan	Panaghiusa	155,156
2.	Antonio Cuenco	Panaghiusa	129,443
3.	Florentino Solon	KBL	92,707
4.	Luis Diores	KBL	42,902
5.	George Baladjay	UNIDO	38,951
6.	Raul del Mar	Independent	35,003
7.	Valentino Legaspi	UNIDO	31,448
8.	Loreto Durano	Independent	27,235
9.	Ramon Llaguno	Nacionalista	25,649
10.	Antonio Mansueto	Nacionalista	23,008
11.	Manuel Paradela	PDP–Laban	21,543
12.	Bartolome Cabangbang	Federal	21,223
13.	Vicente Abangan	National Union for Liberation	19,856
14.	Emilio Lumontad Jr	Partido Democrata	18,991
15.	Salutario Fernandez	Pusyon Bisaya	17,005
16.	Manuel Maranga	Partido Democrata	15,483
17.	Miguel Enriquez	Pundok Sugbuanon	12,556
18.	Elias Tan	Federal	10,226
19.	Jose Echavez	Partido Democrata	9,289
20.	Virgilio Abadilla	Independent	7,880
21.	Elydegario Arnado	Independent	6,339
22.	Victor Elipe	Independent	5,990
23.	Abraham Interompa	Independent	4,332
24.	Stephen Java	Independent	3,867
25.	Jose Maria Lozada	Independent	2,007
26.	Mario Relente	Independent	1,589
27.	Franklin Seno	Independent	976
28.	Romeo Sogue	Independent	733
29.	Sinforoso Villarosa	Independent	430

== Cotabato del Norte (2 seats) ==
Summary of the May 14, 1984 Regular Batasang Pambansa election results for the Province of Cotabato del Norte
Rank	Candidate	Party	Votes
1.	Carlos B. Cajelo	KBL	72,137
2.	Tomas Baga Jr	KBL	60,880
3.	Esteban Doruelo	Nacionalista (Roy Wing)	58,470
4.	Ernesto Roldan	Nacionalista (Roy Wing)	49,678
5.	Jesus Amparo	Konsensiya ng Bayan	45,631
6.	Anacleto Badoy	UNIDO	43,986
7.	John Hofer	KBL (Independent)	38,014
8.	Leopoldo Jalandoni	UNIDO	32,548
9.	Wahab Tandual	UNIDO	30,698
10.	Mama Dalandag	Independent	11,005

== Cotabato del Sur (3 seats) ==
Summary of the May 14, 1984 Regular Batasang Pambansa election results for the Province of Cotabato del Sur
Rank	Candidate	Party	Votes
1.	Rogelio V. Garcia	UNIDO	106,357
2.	Hilario B. de Pedro	UNIDO	92,699
3.	Rufino B. Bañas	UNIDO	92,144
4.	Antonio Acharon	KBL	47,512
5.	Adelbert Antonino	Independent	24,433
6.	Jose T. Sison	KBL	
7.	Gregoria Morales	KBL	
8.	Quirico Lim	Mindanao Alliance	
9.	Leonardo Cocjin Jr	Mindanao Alliance	
10.	Ephraim Defiño	Youth Party (Philippines)	
11.	Camilo Dionio Jr	Nacionalista	
12.	Thomas Hofer	Independent	
13.	Dionisio Literal	Nacionalista	
14.	Felixberto Perbillo	Nacionalista	
15.	Danilo Napala	Federal	
16.	Juanito Purisima	Independent	
17.	Honorio Cornejo	Independent	
18.	Rio Rivera	Independent	
19.	Edmund Ruaro	Independent	
20.	Alimudin Hassan	Independent	
21.	Felix Naciongayo Jr	Independent	

== Davao City (2 seats) ==
Summary of the May 14, 1984 Regular Batasang Pambansa election results for Davao City
Rank	Candidate	Party	Votes
1.	Manuel M. Garcia	KBL	79,825
2.	Zafiro Respicio	PDP–Laban	77,608
3.	Prospero Nograles	UNIDO	67,529
4.	Valentino Banzon	Nacionalista	52,714
5.	Luis Santos	UNIDO	52,226
6.	Felicidad Santos	KBL	
7.	Bienvenido Amora	Independent	
8.	Domingo Vidanes	Nacionalista	
9.	Samuel Oceña	PDP–Laban	
10.	Jose Santes	Independent	
11.	Jose Lopez	Independent	
12.	Mariano Santander Jr	Poor People's Party	
13.	Mateo Deligero	Federal	
14.	Eduardo Dacudao	Federal	
15.	Enrique Lozada	Independent	
16.	Gregorio Batiller	Independent	
17.	Joseph Perez de Tagle	Independent	
18.	Benjamin del Rosario	Independent	
19.	Aurelio Marasigan	Independent	

== Davao del Norte (3 seats) ==
Summary of the May 14, 1984 Regular Batasang Pambansa election results for the Province of Davao del Norte
Rank	Candidate	Party	Votes
1.	Rodolfo P. del Rosario Sr	KBL	165,531
2.	Rolando C. Marcial	PDP–Laban	126,065
3.	Rogelio M. Sarmiento	KBL	124,722
4.	Baltazar Sator	PDP–Laban	91,633
5.	Gelacio Gementiza	KBL	89,283
6.	Jose R. Caballero	UNIDO	55,309
7.	Ramon Tirol	Nacionalista	54,431
8.	Ruperto Gonzaga	PDP–Laban	46,886
9.	Verulo Boiser	UNIDO	20,832
10.	Dominador Payot	Federal	311
11.	Ruperto Garcia	Federal	110
12.	Valeriano Pintor	Independent	42
13.	Cecilia de la Paz (withdrew)	Nacionalista	0

== Davao del Sur (2 seats) ==
Summary of the May 14, 1984 Regular Batasang Pambansa election results for the Province of Davao del Sur
Rank	Candidate	Party	Votes
1.	Douglas Cagas	PDP–Laban	100,067
2.	Alejandro Almendras	KBL	92,384
3.	Benjamin Bautista Sr	KBL	83,034
4.	Dominador Carillo	PDP–Laban	
5.	Saturnino Parcasio	Nacionalista	
6.	Isidoro Bajo	Independent	
7.	Antonio Kinoc	Independent	
8.	Jose Enginco	People's Party	

== Davao Oriental (1 seat) ==
Summary of the May 14, 1984 Regular Batasang Pambansa election results for the Province of Davao Oriental
Rank	Candidate	Party	Votes
1.	Merced Edith N. Rabat	KBL	57,218
2.	Josefina Sibala	UNIDO	40,322
3.	Leopoldo N. Lopez	KBL (Independent)	34,803
4.	Thelma Z. Almario	Nacionalista	
5.	Crisanto Maniwang	Mindanao Alliance	
6.	Jose Cayetano	Mindanao Alliance	

== Eastern Samar (1 seat) ==
Summary of the May 14, 1984 Regular Batasang Pambansa election results for the Province of Eastern Samar
Rank	Candidate	Party	Votes
1.	Vicente O. Valley	KBL	54,124
2.	Fidel Anacta	Nacionalista (Roy Wing)	53,637
3.	Jose Ramirez	National Union for Liberation	3,251
4.	Celestino Sabate	Independent	2,200
5.	Camilo Libanan	UNIDO	151
6.	Adelino Ravas	Independent	35
7.	Jovencio Bernardo	Independent	5
8.	Vicente Montallana (withdrew)	Nacionalista	0

== Ifugao (1 seat) ==
Summary of the May 14, 1984 Regular Batasang Pambansa election results for the Province of Ifugao
Rank	Candidate	Party	Votes
1.	Zosimo Paredes	KBL (Independent)	17,480
2.	Gualberto Lumauig	KBL	15,492
3.	Teodoro Baguilat Sr.	Nacionalista	565
4.	Benjamin Nadugo	Independent	36

== Iligan City (1 seat) ==
Summary of the May 14, 1984 Regular Batasang Pambansa election results for Iligan City
Rank	Candidate	Party	Votes
1.	Camilo P. Cabili	KBL	65,961
2.	Alan Flores	UNIDO	11,192
3.	Romeo Maata	PDP–Laban	4,127
4.	Bonifacio Legaspi	Nacionalista	3,438
5.	Teofilo Landez	PDP–Laban	2,100

== Ilocos Norte (2 seats) ==
Summary of the May 14, 1984 Regular Batasang Pambansa election results for the Province of Ilocos Norte
Rank	Candidate	Party	Votes
1.	Imee Marcos	KBL	199,837
2.	Antonio Raquiza	KBL	164,117
3.	Arturo Romero	Independent	23,197
4.	Cesar Ventura	UNIDO	
5.	Damaso Samonte	UNIDO	
6.	Ross Tipon	UNIDO	
7.	Emerito Salva	Independent	

== Ilocos Sur (2 seats) ==
Summary of the May 14, 1984 Regular Batasang Pambansa election results for the Province of Ilocos Sur
Rank	Candidate	Party	Votes
1.	Salacnib F. Baterina	KBL	161,218
2.	Eric Singson	KBL	147,734
3.	Pablito Sanidad Jr	UNIDO	78,050
4.	Chavit Singson	KBL	
5.	Porfirio Rapanut	Nacionalista	13,365
6.	Ramon Encarnacion	UNIDO	12,225
7.	Benjamin Singson	Independent	
8.	Godofredo Reyes	KBL	
9.	Pedro Singson	Independent	
10.	Clemente Gagarin	Nacionalista	
11.	Augusto Tobias	Nacionalista (Roy Wing)	
12.	Fidel Villanueva	Independent	
13.	Francisco Ante	Independent	
14.	Ernesto Antolin	Independent	
15.	Jose Bragado	Independent	
16.	Lucas Cauton	Independent	

== Iloilo (5 seats) ==
Summary of the May 14, 1984 Regular Batasang Pambansa election results for the Province of Iloilo
Rank	Candidate	Party	Votes
1.	Fermin Z. Caram Jr	UNIDO	360,555
2.	Arthur Defensor Sr.	UNIDO	331,322
3.	Rafael Palmares	Nacionalista	309,839
4.	Narciso Monfort	KBL	248,680
5.	Salvador B. Britanico	KBL	225,557
6.	Niel Tupas Sr.	KBL	
7.	Lazaro Zulueta	KBL	
8.	Emilio dela Cruz	KBL	
9.	Teodulo Padernal	KBL	
10.	Domingo Trompeta Jr	UNIDO	
11.	Mario Salcedo Jr	UNIDO	
12.	Licargo Tirador	UNIDO	
13.	Fortunato Padilla	Nacionalista	
14.	Benjamin Moreno	Nacionalista	
15.	Lazaro Belgica	Nacionalista	
16.	Quirino Baterna	Social Democratic Party (Philippines)	
17.	Pascual Espinosa	PDP–Laban	
18.	Roman Mosqueda III	PDP–Laban	
19.	Avelino Javellana	PDP–Laban	
20.	Nicolas Lutero Jr	PDP–Laban	
21.	Rodolfo Cabado	PDP–Laban	
22.	Gualberto Opong	Nacionalista (Roy Wing)	
23.	Crispin Taaban	Federal	

== Isabela (3 seats) ==
Summary of the May 14, 1984 Regular Batasang Pambansa election results for the Province of Isabela
Rank	Candidate	Party	Votes
1.	Rodolfo B. Albano	KBL	307,052
2.	Prospero G. Bello	KBL	226,064
3.	Simplicio B. Domingo Jr	KBL	225,373
4.	Celso Gangan	Timek	
5.	Wilson Nuesa	Timek	
6.	Melanio T. Singson	Timek	
7.	Gaudencio Sarangaya III	UNIDO	
8.	Horacio Pascual	Nacionalista (Roy Wing)	
9.	Floresmindo Ramirez	Nacionalista (Roy Wing)	
10.	Antonio Tarampi	Nacionalista (Roy Wing)	
11.	Isaac de Alban	Social Democratic Party (Philippines)	
12.	Agustin Guillermo	Social Democratic Party (Philippines)	
13.	Federico Pobre	Social Democratic Party (Philippines)	
14.	Jaime Imbag	Federal	
15.	Benedicto Mariano	Independent	
16.	Bibiano Paggao	Independent	
17.	Elpidio Sumabat	Independent	

== Kalinga-Apayao (1 seat) ==
Summary of the May 14, 1984 Regular Batasang Pambansa election results for the Province of Kalinga-Apayao
Rank	Candidate	Party	Votes
1.	David M. Puzon	KBL	24,198
2.	Domingo Masadao Jr	UNIDO	8,048
3.	Amado Vargas	Independent	7,454
4.	Tanding Odiem	KBL (Independent)	2,939
5.	Alfredo Apaling	Nacionalista	
6.	Inocencio Lopez	UNIDO	
7.	Ephraim Ordonio	Independent	

== La Union (2 seats) ==
Summary of the May 14, 1984 Regular Batasang Pambansa election results for the Province of La Union
Rank	Candidate	Party	Votes
1.	Jose Aspiras	KBL	176,412
2.	Joaquin L. Ortega	KBL	142,315
3.	Manuel Cases Jr.	UNIDO	75,969
4.	Napoleon Dulay	Nacionalista	19,383
5.	Edmundo Jose Rimando	UNIDO	
6.	Victor Ortega	Independent	
7.	Cecilio Milo	Nacionalista	
8.	Epifanio Castillejos	Independent	
9.	Luis Viloria	Independent	
10.	Ceferino Arquiza	Independent	
11.	Gil Gallardo	Independent	
12.	Rosendo Ganaden	Independent	
13.	Casiano Ledda	Independent	
14.	Benigno Pulmano	Independent	

== Laguna (4 seats) ==
Summary of the May 14, 1984 Regular Batasang Pambansa election results for the Province of Laguna
Rank	Candidate	Party	Votes
1.	Luis A. Yulo	KBL	207,977
2.	Rustico F. delos Reyes Jr.	PSL	178,862
3.	Arturo Brion	KBL	141,236
4.	Wenceslao Lagumbay	KBL	133,037
5.	Florante Aquino	PSL	132,900
6.	Edgardo Salandanan	UNIDO	112,259
7.	Magdaleno Palacol Sr.	UNIDO	84,413
8.	Napoleon Medalla	PSL	84,313
9.	Jun Chipeco	PDP–Laban	76,773
10.	Leonides C. de Leon	KBL	52,784
11.	Restituto Luna	PSL	48,416
12.	Isidro Hildawa	UNIDO	42,530
13.	Marciano Brion Jr	UNIDO	39,980
14.	Benjamin Agarao Sr.	Independent	36,971
15.	Pepito Castro	PDP–Laban	31,378
16.	Jimmy Gonzales	Nacionalista	27,870
15.	Clarence Agarao	Nacionalista	22,980
18.	Lina Litton	Nacionalista	19,134
19.	Diosdado Monzon	Nacionalista	15,540
20.	Fidel Bardos	Federal	11,843
21.	Rodolfo Galang	Independent	9,902

== Lanao del Norte (1 seat) ==
Summary of the May 14, 1984 Regular Batasang Pambansa election results for the Province of Lanao del Norte
Rank	Candidate	Party	Votes
1.	Abdullah D. Dimaporo	KBL	104,497
2.	Francisco L. Abalos	Mindanao Alliance	45,674
3.	Abdel Azish Ali	PDP–Laban	5,968
4.	Romeo Lluch	UNIDO	
5.	Marconi Paiso	Nacionalista	
6.	Tirso Cabili	Independent	

== Lanao del Sur (2 seats) ==
Summary of the May 14, 1984 Regular Batasang Pambansa election results for the Province of Lanao del Sur
Rank	Candidate	Party	Votes
1.	Macacuna B. Dimaporo	KBL	163,858
2.	Omar M. Dianalan	KBL	147,754
3.	Liningding Pangandaman	Nacionalista	51,317
4.	Abdul Ghafur Madki Alonto	UNIDO	34,809
5.	Said Amen Pangarungan	PDP–Laban	
6.	Kunnug Sinad Tumbaya	Nacionalista	
7.	Kasam Alawi Marahombsar	UNIDO	
8.	Meno Manabilang	Federal	
9.	Adhel Tomabiling Pangandaman	Independent	

== Las Piñas-Parañaque (1 seat) ==
Summary of the May 14, 1984 Regular Batasang Pambansa election results for the Municipalities of Las Piñas & Parañaque
Rank	Candidate	Party	Votes
1.	Jaime Ferrer	UNIDO	118,020
2.	Roilo Golez	KBL	78,472
3.	Antonio Tamayo	Social Democratic Party (Philippines)	12,160
4.	Freddie Webb	Independent	6,611
5.	Jose Maria Mercader	Nacionalista	322
6.	Jose Crisostomo Jr	Independent	67
7.	Floro Caritan	Independent	

== Leyte (5 seats) ==
Summary of the May 14, 1984 Regular Batasang Pambansa election results for the Province of Leyte
Rank	Candidate	Party	Votes
1.	Benjamin Romualdez^{b}	KBL	139,388
2.	Artemio E. Mate	KBL	116,918
3.	Alberto S. Veloso	KBL	115,957
4.	Damian V. Aldaba	KBL	107,103
5.	Emiliano J. Melgazo	KBL	90,352
6.	Emmanuel Veloso	UNIDO	
7.	Cesar Villegas	UNIDO	
8.	Benjamin Abella	UNIDO	
9.	Claudio Dayaon	Nacionalista	
10.	Abraham Lagarde	Nacionalista	
11.	Felicisimo Asoy	UNIDO	
12.	Basilio Agravante	Nacionalista (Roy Wing)	
13.	Cirilo Roy Montejo	UNIDO	
14.	Manuel Tutaan	Nacionalista	
15.	Agustin Arnaiz Sr	Social Democratic Party (Philippines)	
16.	Bernardino Solano	Nacionalista	
17.	Macario Esmas Jr	Social Democratic Party (Philippines)	
18.	Baldomero Falcone	Social Democratic Party (Philippines)	
19.	Miguel Peliño	Nacionalista (Roy Wing)	
20.	Crispulo Truya	PDP–Laban	
21.	Wallentin Banzon	Independent	
22.	Eduardo Bertulfo	Independent	

^bRomualdez preferred to sit as Ambassador of the Philippines to the United States, thereby he was disqualified to sit as Mambabatas Pambansa of Leyte.

== Maguindanao (2 seats) ==
Summary of the May 14, 1984 Regular Batasang Pambansa election results for the Province of Maguindanao
Rank	Candidate	Party	Votes
1.	Simeon Datumanong	KBL	233,584
2.	Salipada Pendatun^{c}	KBL	217,428
3.	Tahir Lidasan	KBL (Independent)	131,377
4.	Datu Mama Sinsuat	UNIDO	80,163
5.	Amilil Malaguiok	KBL (Independent)	
6.	Alunan C. Gland	PDP–Laban	
7.	Romulo Ferran	Independent	

^cPendatun died in office on January 27, 1985.

== Makati (1 seat) ==
Summary of the May 14, 1984 Regular Batasang Pambansa election results for the Municipality of Makati
Rank	Candidate	Party	Votes
1.	Ruperto Gaite	KBL	107,920
2.	Aurora Pijuan	UNIDO	103,978
3.	Rolando Carbonell	Partido ng Malayang Pilipino	
4.	Alexander Villalon	Independent	3,242
5.	Andres Cacanindo	Christian Democratic Party	
6.	Ted Samuel Jr	Federal	
7.	Benjamin Bargas	Independent	
8.	Jeanette Dorres	Independent	
9.	Ricardo Francisco	Independent	
10.	Friedrich Paterro	Independent	

== Malabon–Navotas–Valenzuela (2 seats) ==
Summary of the May 14, 1984 Regular Batasang Pambansa election results for the Municipalities of Malabon–Navotas–Valenzuela
Rank	Candidate	Party	Votes
1.	Jesus T. Tanchanco	KBL	136,647
2.	Manuel C. Domingo	UNIDO	112,866
3.	Cipriano Bautista	KBL	102,538
4.	Ricardo Valmonte	UNIDO	98,774
5.	Edgardo Romero	Independent	
6.	Benito Bolito	Independent	
7.	Facifico Morelos	Independent	
8.	Bernardo Nazal	Independent	
9.	Angel Paez	Independent	
10.	Conrado Radam	Independent	
11.	Abelardo del Rosario	Independent	
12.	Antonio Villanueva	Independent	

== Manila (6 seats) ==
Summary of the May 14, 1984 Regular Batasang Pambansa election results for the City of Manila
Rank	Candidate	Party	Votes
1.	Eva Estrada-Kalaw	UNIDO	549,281
2.	Gonzalo Puyat II	UNIDO	508,270
3.	Mel Lopez	UNIDO	497,388
4.	Arturo Tolentino	KBL	422,986
5.	Carlos Fernandez	UNIDO	388,365
6.	Lito Atienza	UNIDO	363,505
7.	Joey Lina	UNIDO	334,283
8.	Gerardo Espina Sr.	KBL	321,669
9.	Amado Bagatsing	KBL	294,278
10.	James Barbers	KBL	273,107
11.	Felicisimo Cabigao	KBL	198,412
12.	Roberto Sese	KBL	198,159
13.	Pablo V. Ocampo	PDP–Laban	109,915
14.	Herminio Astorga	Independent	44,630
15.	Juan T. David	PDP–Laban	38,241
16.	Roberto Oca Jr.	Independent	24,681
17.	Arturo Salonga	PDP–Laban	18,238
18.	Ruben Paypon	Independent	15,526
19.	Simeon Garcia	Nacionalista	12,998
20.	Rodrigo Melchor	PDP–Laban	11,269
21.	Reynaldo Aralar	Independent	10,957
22.	Jose Santos	Nacionalista	9,010
23.	Paquita Flores	LM	8,985
24.	Arleo Magtibay	Independent	8,335
25.	Virgilio Tomesa	PDP–Laban	7,739
26.	Honesto Salcedo	PDP–Laban	7,430
27.	Joaquin Yuseco	Nacionalista	7,279
28.	Rosendo Yap	Independent	3,315
29.	Ramon Arevalo	Independent	2,558
30.	Felino Timbol	Federal	2,544
31.	Daniel Edralin	Christian Democratic Party	1,480
32.	William Chan	Independent	1,477
33.	Joseph Sehra	Independent	881
34.	Roman Uy	Independent	880
35.	Nicanor Bautista	Christian Democratic Party	844
36.	Antonio Ramirez	Federal	819
37.	Federico Ce	Independent	797
38.	Lucio Galad	Federal	793
39.	Isabelo Lim	Independent	742
40.	Humberto Basco	Independent	714
41.	Josefina de Joya	Independent	633
42.	Cirilo Olleres	Independent	583
43.	Augusto Galido	Independent	521
44.	Rogelio Poblete	Federal	519
45.	Leonides Peñaflor	Philippine Labor Party	464
46.	Crisostomo Vitug	Federal	430
47.	Juanito Ilaw	Independent	389
48.	Gavino Magdamit	Philippine Labor Party	381
49.	Florendio Tipanao Sr.	Independent	360
50.	Jose Belviz	Independent	350
51.	Felipe Pangilinan	Independent	284
52.	Job Montecillo	Federal	284
53.	Manuel Igrosa	Federal	273
54.	Onofre Sebastian	Independent	236
55.	Aniceto Quime	Independent	222
56.	Danny Trajano	Independent	210
57.	Eduardo Derequito	Independent	189
58.	Francisco Gatmaitan	Independent	127
59.	Arturo V. Samaniego	Allied Socialist Party	90
60.	Gregorio Taruc	Independent	83

== Marinduque (1 seat) ==
Summary of the May 14, 1984 Regular Batasang Pambansa election results for the Province of Marinduque
Rank	Candidate	Party	Votes
1.	Carmencita Reyes	KBL	24,960
2.	Francisco Lecaroz	UNIDO	24,340
3.	Wilfredo Red	Independent	
4.	Efren Marciano	Independent	

== Masbate (2 seats) ==
Summary of the May 14, 1984 Regular Batasang Pambansa election results for the Province of Masbate
Rank	Candidate	Party	Votes
1.	Jolly T. Fernandez	UNIDO	81,688
2.	Venancio L. Yaneza	Independent	70,679
3.	Manuel Sese	KBL	67,538
4.	Pablo Bautista	KBL	63,286
5.	Nestor Espenilla	UNIDO	46,557
6.	Raul Estrella	Bicol Saro	19,687
7.	Santos Abenir	LM	
8.	Henrietta Esparago	Liberal	
9.	Jesus Blanca	Liberal	
10.	Nestor Joson	Bicol Saro	
11.	Antonio Medina	PDP–Laban	
12.	Ricardo Butalid	Independent	
13.	Amancio Aguilar	Independent	
14.	Vicente Lim Jr.	Independent	

== Misamis Occidental (1 seat) ==
Summary of the May 14, 1984 Regular Batasang Pambansa election results for the Province of Misamis Occidental
Rank	Candidate	Party	Votes
1.	Henry Y. Regalado	KBL	61,290
2.	William Chiongbian	Independent	56,220
3.	Napoleon Sanciangco	Mindanao Alliance	11,405
4.	Felipe Tac-an	UNIDO	
5.	Sonny Leuterio	PDP–Laban	
6.	Arturo del Pozo	Nacionalista	
7.	Julio Ozamiz	Independent	
8.	Ursula Dajao	Independent	

== Misamis Oriental (2 seats) ==
Summary of the May 14, 1984 Regular Batasang Pambansa election results for the Province of Misamis Oriental
Rank	Candidate	Party	Votes
1.	Homobono Adaza	Mindanao Alliance	
2.	Concordio C. Diel	KBL	
3.	Rufus Rodriguez	KBL	
4.	Teodoro Cabeltes	Mindanao Alliance	
5.	Constantino Jaraula	PDP–Laban	
6.	Arturo Lugod	PDP–Laban	
7.	Irving Mediante	UNIDO	
8.	Frederico Gapuz	Social Democratic Party (Philippines)	
9.	Antonio Dugenio	Federal	
10.	Fernando Pagano Jr	Independent	
11.	Alexander Tacarde	Independent	

== Mountain Province (1 seat) ==
Summary of the May 14, 1984 Regular Batasang Pambansa election results for Mountain Province
Rank	Candidate	Party	Votes
1.	Victor Dominguez	KBL	15,754
2.	William Claver	PDP–Laban	7,620
3.	Padong Lazaro	Nacionalista (Roy Wing)	508

== Negros Occidental (7 seats) ==
Summary of the May 14, 1984 Regular Batasang Pambansa election results for the Province of Negros Occidental
Rank	Candidate	Party	Votes
1.	Roberto L. Montelibano	KBL	328,763
2.	Alfredo Marañon	KBL	281,801
3.	Roberto A. Gatuslao	KBL	270,244
4.	Antonio M. Gatuslao	Independent	254,427
5.	Wilson Gamboa Sr.	UNIDO	253,305
6.	Jaime G. Golez	KBL	243,703
7.	Jose Y. Varela Jr	KBL	242,050
8.	Alfonso Garcia	KBL	
9.	Teodoro Benedicto	KBL	
10.	Artemio Balinas	UNIDO	
11.	Corazon Zayco	UNIDO	
12.	Hortensia Starke	UNIDO	
13.	Amado Parreño Jr	UNIDO	
14.	Jose Puey Jr	UNIDO	
15.	Ernesto Faunlaque	Nacionalista	
16.	Jose Villagracia	Nacionalista	
17.	Reynaldo Novero	Nacionalista	
18.	Rodolfo Guance	Nacionalista	
19.	Jose Jimenez	Nacionalista	
20.	Teodoro Aritao	Nacionalista (Roy Wing)	
21.	Angel Dudero	Nacionalista (Roy Wing)	
22.	Winston Rodrigazo	Nacionalista (Roy Wing)	
23.	Guillermo Rojo Jr.	Nacionalista (Roy Wing)	
24.	Francisco Tagamolia	Nacionalista (Roy Wing)	
25.	Pachico Villaluna	Nacionalista (Roy Wing)	
26.	Serafin Yngson	Nacionalista (Roy Wing)	
27.	Marcelo Briones	Coalition of Concerned Citizens of Negros	
28.	Lorendo Dilag	Coalition of Concerned Citizens of Negros	
29.	Renecio Espiritu Sr	Coalition of Concerned Citizens of Negros	
30.	Maria Socorro Tuvilla	Coalition of Concerned Citizens of Negros	
31.	Nicasio V. Garces	Philippine Reformist Party	
32.	Luis Anfore	Independent	
33.	Antonio Feria	Independent	

== Negros Oriental (3 seats) ==
Summary of the May 14, 1984 Regular Batasang Pambansa election results for the Province of Negros Oriental
Rank	Candidate	Party	Votes
1.	Emilio Macias II	KBL	139,984
2.	Andres C. Bustamante	KBL	137,445
3.	Ricardo D. Abiera	KBL	100,346
4.	Margarito Teves	UNIDO	
5.	Sergio Flamiano Beltran	UNIDO	
6.	Marcelino Maximo	Pusyon Bisaya	
7.	Saleto Erames	UNIDO	
8.	Henry Sojor	Pusyon Bisaya	
9.	Jesus Villegas	Pusyon Bisaya	
10.	Efren Quial III	PDP–Laban	
11.	Jose Ancheta	PDP–Laban	
12.	Elpidio Onto	PDP–Laban	
13.	Oscar Trinidad	Independent	

== Northern Samar (1 seat) ==
Summary of the May 14, 1984 Regular Batasang Pambansa election results for the Province of Northern Samar
Rank	Candidate	Party	Votes
1.	Edilberto A. Del Valle	KBL	
2.	Emil Ong	Nacionalista	
3.	Remigio Wan	UNIDO	
4.	Wenceslao Pancho	Federal	

== Nueva Ecija (4 seats) ==
Summary of the May 14, 1984 Regular Batasang Pambansa election results for the Province of Nueva Ecija
Rank	Candidate	Party	Votes
1.	Eduardo Nonato Joson	KBL	260,983
2.	Angel D. Concepcion	KBL	156,892
3.	Mario S. Garcia	KBL	156,144
4.	Leopoldo D. Diaz	KBL (Independent)	152,146
5.	Sedfrey Ordoñez	LABAN	130,342
6.	Narciso Nario	KBL	111,367
7.	Domingo Bautista	UNIDO	
8.	Rebeck Espiritu	UNIDO	
9.	Virgilio Calica	PDP–Laban	
10.	Pablo Salomon	UNIDO	
11.	Emmanuel Noli Santos	PDP–Laban	
12.	Celestino Juan	Nacionalista	
13.	Romeo Maliwat	Nacionalista	
14.	Alfonso Bajimma	Nacionalista	
15.	Florentino Daus	Social Democratic Party (Philippines)	
16.	Rudy Franklin Eduardo	Independent	
17.	Jose Espino	UNIDO	
18.	Santiago Marcos	Independent	
19.	Meliton Pajarillaga	Independent	

== Nueva Vizcaya (1 seat) ==
Summary of the May 14, 1984 Regular Batasang Pambansa election results for the Province of Nueva Vizcaya
Rank	Candidate	Party	Votes
1.	Leonardo B. Perez	KBL	65,184
2.	Carlos M. Padilla	Social Democratic Party (Philippines)	62,052
3.	Francisco Acosta	UNIDO	3,907
4.	Quirico Pilotin	Nacionalista (Roy Wing)	
5.	Ruth Padilla	Independent	
6.	Belen Calderon	Independent	

== Occidental Mindoro (1 seat) ==
Summary of the May 14, 1984 Regular Batasang Pambansa election results for the Province of Occidental Mindoro
Rank	Candidate	Party	Votes
1.	Pedro T. Mendiola	KBL	40,795
2.	Ricardo Quintos	UNIDO	25,674
3.	Anita N. Villarosa	KBL (Independent)	19,645
4.	Albino Arevalo	PDP–Laban	4,955
5.	Alberto Tajonera	Independent	741

== Olongapo City (1 seat) ==
Summary of the May 14, 1984 Regular Batasang Pambansa election results for Olongapo City
Rank	Candidate	Party	Votes
1.	Amelia Gordon	KBL	42,525
2.	Teddy Macapagal	PDP–Laban	38,100
3.	Hector Ruiz	UNIDO	
4.	Jose Igrobay	Federal	
5.	Mercado Odoc	Federal	
6.	Aquilino Panganiban	Independent	
7.	Alberto Roxas	Independent	

== Oriental Mindoro (2 seats) ==
Summary of the May 14, 1984 Regular Batasang Pambansa election results for the Province of Oriental Mindoro
Rank	Candidate	Party	Votes
1.	Rolleo L. Ignacio	UNIDO	80,906
2.	Jose Reynaldo V. Morente	KBL	63,607
3.	Alfonso Umali Sr.	KBL	
4.	Herminio Erorita	KBL (Independent)	
5.	Emilio Leachon Jr	UNIDO	
6.	Epigenio Navarro	UNIDO	
7.	Benildo Hernandez	UNIDO (Independent)	
8.	Teresita Infantado-Gines	Independent	
9.	Leandro Marcos Jr	Independent	
10.	Pablo Reyes	Independent	

== Palawan (1 seat) ==
Summary of the May 14, 1984 Regular Batasang Pambansa election results for the Province of Palawan
Rank	Candidate	Party	Votes
1.	Ramon Mitra Jr.	PDP–Laban	79,236
2.	Teodoro Q. Peña	KBL	57,090

== Pampanga (4 seats) ==
Summary of the May 14, 1984 Regular Batasang Pambansa election results for the Province of Pampanga
Rank	Candidate	Party	Votes
1.	Juanita Nepomuceno	UNIDO	246,231
2.	Emigdio Lingad	UNIDO	227,111
3.	Rafael Lazatin	UNIDO	211,288
4.	Aber P. Canlas	KBL	203,856
5.	Bren Guiao	UNIDO	195,583
6.	Lorenzo Timbol	KBL	124,148
7.	Cicero Jose Punsalan	KBL	
8.	Rogelio de la Rosa	KBL	
9.	Rogelio Tiglao	Nacionalista (Roy Wing)	
10.	Eller Torres	Social Democratic Party (Philippines)	
11.	Amelio Mutuc	Independent	
12.	Jose Ocampo	LM	
13.	Abelardo Galang	Christian Democratic Party	
14.	Ruben Feliciano	Federal	
15.	Oliver Sanchez	Federal	
16.	Paterno Canlas	Independent	
17.	Romeo Taruc	Independent	

== Pangasinan (6 seats) ==
Summary of the May 14, 1984 Regular Batasang Pambansa election results for the Province of Pangasinan
Rank	Candidate	Party	Votes
1.	Victor Aguedo E. Agbayani	KBL (Independent)	532,433
2.	Gregorio S. Cendaña	KBL	407,595
3.	Felipe P. de Vera	KBL	395,210
4.	Demetrio G. Demetria	UNIDO	267,196
5.	Conrado Estrella Sr.	KBL	260,426
6.	Fabian S. Sison	UNIDO	240,133
7.	Vicente Millora	KBL	178,516
8.	Jeremias U. Montemayor	KBL	177,527
9.	Antonio Villar Sr	KBL	168,756
10.	Liberato Reyna	UNIDO	131,819
11.	Oscar Orbos	UNIDO	
12.	Romualdo de Leon	UNIDO	
13.	Roberto Ferrer	UNIDO	
14.	Ruth Noel	PDP–Laban	
15.	Nancy Sison	Nacionalista	
16.	Juan de Vera	Nacionalista	
17.	Manuel Castro	Nacionalista	
18.	Antonio Reyes	Nacionalista	
19.	Leopoldo Quesada	Nacionalista	
20.	Candido Campos	Christian Democratic Party	
21.	Camilo Laforteza	Federal	
22.	Cesar Victro	LM	
23.	Julius Magno	Independent	
24.	Rogelio Perez	Independent	
25.	Gilbert Uson	Independent	

== Pasay (1 seat) ==
Summary of the May 14, 1984 Regular Batasang Pambansa election results for the Municipality of Pasay
Rank	Candidate	Party	Votes
1.	Jose Conrado Benitez	KBL	84,772
2.	Eduardo Calixto	UNIDO	70,422
3.	Ramon Bagatsing Jr.	Nacionalista	8,366
4.	Glicerio Gervero	Christian Democratic Party	727
5.	Jovino Angel	Independent	192
6.	Elmer Villacastin	Independent	190
7.	Eufemio Pollo	Independent	106
8.	Liberato Roldan	Independent	36
9.	Justo Evangelista	Independent	34

== Pasig-Marikina (2 seats) ==
Summary of the May 14, 1984 Regular Batasang Pambansa election results for the Pasig-Marikina
Rank	Candidate	Party	Votes
1.	Augusto Sanchez	UNIDO	148,321
2.	Emilio de la Paz Jr.	UNIDO	119,842
3.	Jose T. Surban	KBL	101,560
4.	Valenciano Floro	KBL	92,013
5.	Benjamin Molina Jr.	Nacionalista	
6.	Felizardo Bulaong	PDP–Laban	
7.	Mabuhay Sanchez	Nacionalista	
8.	Enrique Abila	LM	
9.	Peter Custodio	Christian Democratic Party	
10.	Conrado Leonardo	LM	
11.	Mamerto Potenciano	Independent	
12.	Saturnino Solomon	Independent	

== Quezon Province (4 seats) ==
Summary of the May 14, 1984 Regular Batasang Pambansa election results for the Province of Quezon
Rank	Candidate	Party	Votes
1.	Oscar F. Santos Jr.	UNIDO	188,424
2.	Hjalmar Quintana	UNIDO	165,833
3.	Bienvenido O. Marquez Jr.	UNIDO	153,935
4.	Cesar D. Bolaños	UNIDO	142,535
5.	Eduardo Escueta	KBL	103,325
6.	Flora V. Tumagay	Independent	94,622
7.	Danilo Suarez	KBL	58,041
8.	Cesar Villariba	KBL	49,738
9.	Godofredo M. Tan	KBL	49,103
10.	Angel Tagarao	Nacionalista	29,061
11.	John B. Calamigan	Nacionalista	
12.	Vicente Rabaya	Nacionalista (Roy Wing)	
13.	Teresita Lalic	Christian Democratic Party	
14.	Francisco Agana	Independent	
15.	Leovegildo Cerilla	Independent	
16.	Gonzalo Gandia	Independent	
17.	Andres Mapaye Jr	Independent	
18.	Florentino Martinez	Independent	
19.	Casiano Montes	Independent	
20.	Jose Bico	Independent	
21.	Ramon Aldea	Independent	

== Quezon City (4 seats) ==
Summary of the May 14, 1984 Regular Batasang Pambansa election results for Quezon City
Rank	Candidate	Party	Votes
1.	Orly Mercado	UNIDO	397,560
2.	Cecilia Muñoz-Palma	UNIDO	327,408
3.	Mel Mathay	KBL	264,067
4.	Alberto Romulo	UNIDO	251,100
5.	Ricardo C. Puno	KBL	238,260
6.	Francisco Tatad	Social Democratic Party (Philippines)	197,849
7.	Estanislao G. Alinea Jr.	KBL	144,386
8.	Brigido Simon Jr.	UNIDO	130,531
9.	Rogelio Quiambao	KBL	115,853
10.	Alfredo Francisco	Independent	51,336
11.	Melencio Castelo	Independent	44,791
12.	Manuel Serrano	Social Democratic Party (Philippines)	42,862
13.	Rafael Mison Jr.	Nacionalista (Laurel Wing)	34,576
14.	Victor Wood	LM	23,764
15.	Mario Montenegro	Independent	18,526
16.	Firdausi Ismail Abbas	Social Democratic Party (Philippines)	13,757
17.	Diosdado Peralta	Social Democratic Party (Philippines)	12,468
18.	Quintin San Diego	Independent	6,710
19.	Francisco Wenceslao	Nacionalista	4,404
20.	Benito Tahare	Independent	3,728
21.	Oscar Lazo Jr.	Nacionalista	2,755
22.	Onofre Julvara	LM	2,678
23.	Oliver Lozano	Independent	2,456
24.	Santiago Manongdo	Independent	2,240
25.	Jose Peñalosa	Independent	2,178
26.	Edward David	LM	1,813
27.	Jose Jesus Nazareno	Social Democratic Party (Philippines)	921
28.	Remigio Tibigar	Independent	813
29.	Wilfredo Torres	Independent	773
30.	Dufronio Calope	Federal	723
31.	Ranavalona Gaite	Independent	702
32.	Romeo Vicente	Independent	649
33.	Nemesio Salvador	Independent	561
34.	Agripino Dumlao Jr.	Christian Democratic Party	517
35.	Ernesto Arellano	Christian Democratic Party	512
36.	Felipe Ysmael	Independent	479
37.	Luis Dicbalo	Nacionalista	427
38.	Lope Rimando	Katipunan ng Katapatan at Kagalingan	423
39.	Numeriano Sabatin	Christian Democratic Party	382
40.	Eva Falcon	Christian Democratic Party	376
41.	Martin Capoli	Federal	340
42.	Rafael Ungria	Christian Democratic Party	166
43.	Victor Planas	Federal	142
44.	Rafael Baloso	Maharlika Welfare Party	111
45.	Andres Culamag	Independent	80

== Quirino Province (1 seat) ==
Summary of the May 14, 1984 Regular Batasang Pambansa election results for the Province of Quirino
Rank	Candidate	Party	Votes
1.	Orlando Dulay	KBL	13,793
2.	Arnulfo Agullana	Nacionalista (Roy Wing)	10,552
3.	Mariano Pimentel	Independent	7,208
4.	Bannuar Bongolan	Independent	1,297
5.	Ernesto Salun-at	UNIDO	1,013

== Rizal Province (2 seats) ==
Summary of the May 14, 1984 Regular Batasang Pambansa election results for the Province of Rizal
Rank	Candidate	Party	Votes
1.	Francisco Sumulong	PDP–Laban	198,432
2.	Emigdio S. Tanjuatco Jr.	PDP–Laban	158,278
3.	Frisco F. San Juan Sr.	KBL	130,613
4.	Gilberto Duavit Sr.	KBL	110,708
5.	Dante San Jose	Christian Democratic Party	3,004

== Romblon (1 seat) ==
Summary of the May 14, 1984 Regular Batasang Pambansa election results for the Province of Romblon
Rank	Candidate	Party	Votes
1.	Natalio M. Beltran Jr.	UNIDO	33,773
2.	Esteban Madrona	Independent	20,964
3.	Nemesio Ganan Jr.	KBL	
4.	Lindbergh Pangga Maaba	KBL (Independent)	
5.	Richard Young	Nacionalista	
6.	Armando Gaac	Federal	
7.	Librado Cuadrasal	Independent	
8.	Manuel Martinez	Independent	
9.	Jovencio Mayor Jr.	Independent	

== Samar (2 seats) ==
Summary of the May 14, 1984 Regular Batasang Pambansa election results for the Province of Samar
Rank	Candidate	Party	Votes
1.	Jose Roño	KBL	29,070
2.	Fernando Veloso	KBL	27,748
3.	Ricardo Avelino	UNIDO	
4.	Godofreda Dean	UNIDO	

== San Juan–Mandaluyong (1 seat) ==
Summary of the May 14, 1984 Regular Batasang Pambansa election results for the Municipalities of San Juan–Mandaluyong
Rank	Candidate	Party	Votes
1.	Neptali Gonzales	UNIDO	101,156
2.	Ronaldo Zamora	KBL	70,504
3.	Rogelio Lepana	Federal	2,110
4.	Emmanuel Topacio	Independent	58
5.	Oliver Raymundo	Independent	54
6.	Ruben Espigol	Christian Democratic Party	36

== Siquijor (1 seat) ==
Summary of the May 14, 1984 Regular Batasang Pambansa election results for the Province of Siquijor
Rank	Candidate	Party	Votes
1.	Manolito L. Asok	KBL	17,244
2.	Orlando Fua Sr.	UNIDO	13,182
3.	Dominador Pernes	PDP–Laban	
4.	Guido Ganhinhin	Social Democratic Party (Philippines)	

== Sorsogon (2 seats) ==
Summary of the May 14, 1984 Regular Batasang Pambansa election results for the Province of Sorsogon
Rank	Candidate	Party	Votes
1.	Salvador Escudero	KBL	62,394
2.	Augusto G. Ortiz	KBL	47,284
3.	Rafael Aquino	Nacionalista	43,733
4.	Redentor Guyala	UNIDO	23,417
5.	Henry Fajardo	Bicol Saro	
6.	Elizalde Diaz	PDP–Laban	
7.	Celerina Gillego-Gotladera	PDP–Laban	
8.	Dominador Reyes	Bicol Saro	
9.	Teodoro de Vera Jr.	UNIDO	
10.	Jose Sabater	Sorsogon Action Party	
11.	Socorro de Castro	Independent	
12.	Manuel Fulgar	Independent	
13.	Fernando Gerona Jr.	Independent	
14.	Geronimo Gimeno	Independent	
15.	Domingo Lucenario	Independent	

== Sultan Kudarat (1 seat) ==
Summary of the May 14, 1984 Regular Batasang Pambansa election results for the Province of Sultan Kudarat
Rank	Candidate	Party	Votes
1.	Benjamin C. Duque	KBL	78,053
2.	Jose Escribano	UNIDO	35,190
3.	Ciscolario Diaz	Nacionalista	3,075
4.	Lina Defino	Young Philippines Party	1,540

== Sulu (1 seat) ==
Summary of the May 14, 1984 Regular Batasang Pambansa election results for the Province of Sulu
Rank	Candidate	Party	Votes
1.	Hussin T. Loong	KBL	
2.	Abraham Rasul	CCA	
3.	Jai Anni	CCA	
4.	Hasim Abubakar	Independent	

== Surigao del Norte (1 seat) ==
Summary of the May 14, 1984 Regular Batasang Pambansa election results for the Province of Surigao del Norte
Rank	Candidate	Party	Votes
1.	Constantino C. Navarro Sr.	KBL	78,519
2.	Wencelito Andanar	PDP–Laban	38,324
3.	Gil Mantilla	UNIDO	
4.	Carmelito Cervantes	Nacionalista	
5.	Desiderio Millari	Nacionalista	

== Surigao del Sur (1 seat) ==
Summary of the May 14, 1984 Regular Batasang Pambansa election results for the Province of Surigao del Sur
Rank	Candidate	Party	Votes
1.	Higino C. Llaguno Jr.	KBL	57,056
2.	Hernando Masangkay	UNIDO	35,779
3.	Montano Ortiz Jr.	PDP–Laban	
4.	Hermie Delicona	Mindanao Alliance	
5.	Leopoldo Rivas	Nacionalista	
6.	Mario Lumanao	Hugpong sa Katawhan	
7.	Jesus Tolentino	Nacionalista	
8.	Homero Elpa	Independent	

== Taguig–Pateros–Muntinlupa (1 seat) ==
Summary of the May 14, 1984 Regular Batasang Pambansa election results for the Municipalities of Taguig–Pateros–Muntinlupa
Rank	Candidate	Party	Votes
1.	Rene Cayetano	KBL	91,174
2.	Damaso Flores	UNIDO	53,731
3.	Dante Tiñga	PDP–Laban	44,766
4.	Rufino Lizardo	Nacionalista	
5.	Calixto Roman	Republican Socialist Party	
6.	Benjamin Musca	Independent	
7.	Jorge Sales	Independent	
8.	Bernardo Tensuan	Independent	

== Tarlac (2 seats) ==
Summary of the May 14, 1984 Regular Batasang Pambansa election results for the Province of Tarlac
Rank	Candidate	Party	Votes
1.	Mercedes Cojuangco-Teodoro	KBL	222,859
2.	Homobono Sawit	KBL	173,883
3.	Jose V. Yap Sr.	PDP–Laban	140,930
4.	Edilberto Zarraga	UNIDO	19,486
5.	Enrique Agana Sr.	Nacionalista	
6.	Bienvenido Balot	Independent	
7.	Benjamin Domingo	Independent	
8.	Arsenia Joaquin	Independent	

== Tawi-Tawi (1 seat) ==
Summary of the May 14, 1984 Regular Batasang Pambansa election results for the Province of Tawi-Tawi
Rank	Candidate	Party	Votes
1.	Celso J. Palma	KBL	23,712
2.	Almarin C. Tillah	CCA	
3.	Cipriano Negrosa	Independent	

== Zambales (1 seat) ==
Summary of the May 14, 1984 Regular Batasang Pambansa election results for the Province of Zambales
Rank	Candidate	Party	Votes
1.	Antonio M. Diaz	KBL	75,640
2.	Amor Deloso	PDP–Laban	67,933

== Zamboanga City (1 seat) ==
Summary of the May 14, 1984 Regular Batasang Pambansa election results for Zamboanga City
Rank	Candidate	Party	Votes
1.	Cesar Climaco^{d}	CCA	85,103
2.	Maria Clara Lobregat	Independent	46,750
3.	Joaquin Enriquez Jr.	KBL	14,116
4.	Rommel Corro	Independent	
5.	Antolin Bongcawel	Nacionalista	
6.	Hadji Limpasan Idjirani	Muslim Democratic Party	
7.	Angelina Corro	Independent	
8.	Ramon Evangelista	Independent	

^dClimaco was assassinated on November 14, 1984.

== Zamboanga del Norte (2 seats) ==
Summary of the May 14, 1984 Regular Batasang Pambansa election results for the Province of Zamboanga del Norte
Rank	Candidate	Party	Votes
1.	Romeo G. Jalosjos Sr.	Nacionalista	64,197
2.	Guardson R. Lood	KBL	39,163
3.	Ernesto S. Amatong	CCA	35,399
4.	Mariano Macias	KBL	
5.	Felipe Azcuna Jr.	CCA	
6.	Reubin Maraon	Nacionalista	
7.	Manuel Sumbilon	Independent	
8.	Nenita Lacaya	Nacionalista	
9.	Alfredo Aleta	Independent	
10.	Germanico Carreon	Independent	
11.	Simeon Jaicten	Independent	

== Zamboanga del Sur (3 seats) ==
Summary of the May 14, 1984 Regular Batasang Pambansa election results for the Province of Zamboanga del Sur
Rank	Candidate	Party	Votes
1.	Vicente M. Cerilles	KBL	138,012
2.	Isidoro E. Real Jr.	CCA	91,513
3.	Bienvenido A. Ebarle	KBL	82,925
4.	Benjamin Arao	CCA	80,470
5.	Wilfredo Cainglet	CCA	
6.	Benjamin Rodriguez	KBL	
7.	Amador Macatangay	CCA	
8.	Belma Cabilao	CCA	
9.	Guillermo Saladaga	Nacionalista (Roy Wing)	
10.	Joseph Banghulot	LM	
11.	Michael Perocho	LM	
12.	Luis Eleazar Bersales Jr.	Nacionalista (Roy Wing)	
13.	Antonio Ceniza	Independent	
14.	Pelagio Estopia	Independent	
15.	Baldomero Fernandez	Independent	

Note: Tally of votes in most provinces and cities were incomplete due to scarcity of resources from the Commission on Elections and various Philippine media outlets.
