= 1987 Philippine House of Representatives elections =

15th Philippine House of Representatives elections

- May 11, 1987
- 200 (of the 214) seats in the House of Representatives of the Philippines; 101 seats needed for a majority
Party	Vote %	Seats	+/–
Lakas	17.48	24	+24
PDP–Laban	17.32	43	+37
UNIDO	12.80	19	−16
Liberal	10.46	16	+16
Nacionalista	7.19	4	+2
KBL	4.10	11	−99
PnB	1.63	2	+2
GAD	1.34	2	+2
LABAN	1.24	1	+1
Coalitions/others	13.19	55	+38
Independent	13.25	23	+17
This lists parties that won seats. See the complete results below.
Speaker before	Speaker after
Nicanor Yñiguez; KBL	Ramon Mitra Jr. Lakas

Elections for the House of Representatives of the Philippines were held on May 11, 1987. This was the first legislative election since 1984, the first House of Representatives elections since 1969, and the first election since the People Power Revolution that overthrew president Ferdinand Marcos and brought Corazon Aquino to power after alleged election fraud by the former during the 1986 presidential election against the latter.

Although no party surpassed 20% of the popular vote, candidates that ran under two or more parties won a quarter of the seats, followed by PDP–Laban and Lakas ng Bansa of subsequent speaker Ramon Mitra, Jr. that would later be the Laban ng Demokratikong Pilipino after some of the members of PDP–Laban defected. The Ferdinand Marcos loyalists either ran under the Kilusang Bagong Lipunan, as independents, or found their way into the pro-Corazon Aquino parties. The pro-Aquino parties won majority of the seats in the House of Representatives.

Under the provisions of the Constitution, the 8th Congress spanned for an unprecedented five years, from June 30, 1987 until June 30, 1992.

== Electoral system ==
The House of Representatives shall have not more than 250 members, unless otherwise fixed by law, of which 20% shall be elected via the party-list system, while the rest are elected via congressional districts. In lieu of an enabling law in regards to the party-list system, sectoral representatives shall continued to be appointed by the president just like previously in the Batasang Pambansa for the first three congresses from the enactment of the constitution, which includes this congress.

In this election, there are 200 seats voted via first-past-the-post in single-member districts. Each province, and a city with a population of 250,000, is guaranteed a seat, with more populous provinces and cities divided into two or more districts.

Congress has the power of redistricting three years after each census.

== Redistricting ==
This election is the first under the 1987 constitution. The districts were based on the ordinance to the constitution. Unlike in the Regular Batasang Pambansa where each province and some cities elected members of parliament at-large in multi-member districts for more populous provinces and cities, the 1987 constitution reintroduced the single-member districts for more populous provinces and cities.

These include the changes in the number of seats per province and city, as compared with the Regular Batasang Pambansa, with each at-large district having one seat unless specified:

- Division of Malabon–Navotas–Valenzuela's at-large district to two districts:
  - Valenzuela becomes its own at-large district.
  - Malabon and Navotas becomes the Malabon–Navotas's at-large district.
- Division of Pasig–Marikina's at-large district to two districts
  - Marikina becomes its own at-large district.
  - Pasig becomes its own at-large district.
- Reapportionment of Las Piñas–Parañaque's at-large district and Taguig–Pateros–Muntinglupa's at-largest district to three districts
  - Las Piñas and Muntinlupa becomes the Las Piñas–Muntinlupa's at-large district.
  - Taguig and Pateros becomes the Taguig–Pateros's at-large district.
  - Parañaque becomes its own at-large district.
- Reapportionment of Baguio's at-large district and Benguet's at-large district
  - Baguio becomes Benguet's 1st district.
  - Benguet becomes the 2nd district.
- Reapportionment of Isabela's at-large district to four districts
  - Isabela's northeastern municipalities becomes the 1st district
  - The Mallig Plains municipalities, Gamu, Naguillan and San Mariano becomes the 2nd district.
  - Cauayan and its bordering municipalities not included in the 2nd district becomes the 3rd district.
  - The southern municipalities becomes the 4th district.
- Reapportionment of Tarlac's at-large district to three districts
  - Tarlac's northern municipalities becomes the 1st district,
  - The central municipalities becomes the 2nd district
  - The southern municipalities becomes the 3rd district.
- Reapportionment of Olongapo's at-large district and Zambales's at-large district
  - Olongapo and the three southernmost municipalities of Zambales becomes the 1st district
  - The rest of Zambales becomes the 2nd district.
- Division of Palawan's at-large district to two districts:
  - Palawan's municipalities north of Puerto Princesa becomes the 1st district
  - Puerto Princesa and the municipalities to its south becomes the 2nd district.
- Reapportionment of Masbate's at-large district to three districts:
  - Masbate's municipalities in Ticao Island and Burias Island becomes the 1st district.
  - The western municipalities in Masbate Island becomes the 2nd district.
  - The eastern municipalities becomes the 3rd district.
- Reapportionment of Iloilo's at-large district to six districts:
  - Iloilo's five southwesternmost municipalities becomes the 1st district.
  - The municipalities immediately to the north and northwest of Iloilo City becomes the 2nd district.
  - Northwestern and central municipalities becomes the 3rd district.
  - Northern municipalities and Passi becomes the 4th district.
  - Barotac Viejo, San Rafael and the municipalities to the northeast of it becomes the 5th district.
  - Iloilo CIty becomes its own at-large district.
- Reapportionment of Negros Occidental's at-large district
  - Negros Occidental's municipalities facing the Tañon Strait becomes the 1st district.
  - The municipalities facing the Visayan Sea becomes the 2nd district
  - The cities and municipalities facing Guimaras Strait north of Bacolod, and Murcia becomes the 3rd district.
  - La Carlota and its bordering cities and municipalities, and Pulupundan becomes the 4th district.
  - Isabela and its bordering municipalities and Himamaylan becomes the 5th district.
  - Kabankalan and all cities and municipalities to the south of it becomes the 6th district.
  - Bacolod becomes its own at-large district.
- Division of Northern Samar's at-large district to two districts
  - Northern Samar's western municipalities becomes the 1st district.
  - The eastern municipalities becomes the 2nd district.
- Division of Sulu's at-large district to two districts
  - Sulu's western municipalities becomes the 1st district.
  - The eastern municipalities becomes the 2nd district.
- Reapportionment of Zamboanga del Norte's at-large district to three districts:
  - Zamboanga del Norte's northeastern municipalities and Dapitan becomes the 1st district.
  - The central municipalities and Dipolog becomes the 2nd district.
  - The southwestern municipalities becomes the 3rd district.
- Division of Agusan del Norte's at-large district to two districts
  - Butuan and Las Nieves becomes the 1st district.
  - The rest of Agusan del Norte becomes the 2nd district.
- Reapportionment of Bukidnon's at-large district to three districts
  - Bukidnon's northern municipalities becomes the 1st district.
  - The eastern municipalities becomes the 2nd district.
  - The southern municipalities becomes the 3rd district.
- Division of Misamis Occidental's at-large district to two districts
  - Oroquieta and the northern municipalities of Misamis Occidental becomes the 1st district.
  - Ozamiz, Tangub and the southern municipalities becomes the 2nd district.
- Division of Surigao del Norte's at-large district to two districts
  - The insular municipalities of Surigao del Norte becomes the 1st district.
  - Surigao City and the municipalities mostly on the Mindanao mainland becomes the 2nd district.
- Division of Davao Oriental's at-large district to two districts
  - Davao Oriental's northern municipalities becomes the 1st district.
  - The southern municipalities becomes the 2nd district.
- Division of Surigao del Sur's at-large district to two districts
  - Surigao del Sur's northern municipalities becomes the 1st district.
  - The southern municipalities becomes the 2nd district.
- Reapportionment of Lanao del Norte's at-large district and Iligan's at-large district to two districts
  - Iligan and Lanao del Norte's coastal municipalities from Baroy to Linamon becomes the 1st district.
  - The rest of the province becomes the 2nd district.

Other at-large districts were divided into districts of the same number. There are 17 new seats that were disputed on this election.

== Results ==
Party	Seats	+/–
Lakas ng Bansa	24	New
PDP–Laban	43	+49
United Nationalist Democratic Organization	19	−16
Liberal Party	16	New
Nacionalista Party	4	+2
Kilusang Bagong Lipunan	11	−99
Partido ng Bayan	2	New
Grand Alliance for Democracy	2	New
Lakas ng Bayan	1	New
Coalitions/others	55	+38
Independent	23	+17
Appointed seats	14	+11
Total	214	+14

== See also ==
- 8th Congress of the Philippines
- Commission on Elections
- Politics of the Philippines
- Philippine elections

== Bibliography ==
- Paras, Corazon L. (2000). The Presidents of the Senate of the Republic of the Philippines. ISBN 971-8832-24-6.
- Pobre, Cesar P. (2000). Philippine Legislature 100 Years. ISBN 971-92245-0-9.
