= Democlito Angeles =

Filipino politician and lawyer

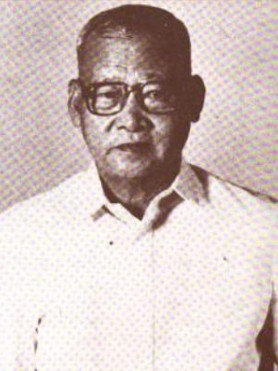
- Official portrait, 1988

Member of the Philippine House of Representatives from Marikina's at-large district
- In office June 30, 1988 – June 30, 1992
- Preceded by: Emilio de la Paz Jr. (redistricting); Augusto Sanchez (redistricting)
- Succeeded by: Romeo Candazo

Personal details
- Born: Democlito J. Angeles; August 3, 1922 Marikina, Philippines
- Party: Liberal
- Spouse: Serabella Angeles
- Children: 2
- Education: Far Eastern University (BA); Manuel L. Quezon University (LLB)
- Occupation: Politician; lawyer

Democlito J. Angeles (born August 3, 1922) was a Filipino politician and lawyer who served as the representative for Marikina's at-large district from 1988 to 1992.

A graduate of the Far Eastern University, Angeles ran a law office before entering politics. He served as a member of the Marikina Municipal Council before being elected to Congress in the 1987 election. As a representative, he allied with Jovito Salonga and served on various committees, including the House Agrarian Reform Committee.

== Early life and career ==
Angeles was born on August 3, 1922, in Calumpang, Marikina. He studied liberal arts at Far Eastern University and pursued legal studies at Manuel L. Quezon University. During his legal career, he operated a law office. Before being elected to Congress, he served as a member of the Marikina Municipal Council.

== House of Representatives (1988–1992) ==
=== Election ===
Marikina received its at-large congressional district upon the effectivity of the 1987 Constitution, after having been grouped in the Pasig–Marikina district since 1984 under the Regular Batasang Pambansa. Angeles ran for the seat in the subsequent 1987 election, the first following the People Power Revolution. During the campaign, he ran under the Liberal Party wing led by senatorial candidate Jovito Salonga. He faced two candidates, including lawyer Salome Montoya, who was endorsed by President Corazon Aquino.

In the May 11 election, Angeles defeated Montoya, receiving 40.93% of the votes counted as of May 13. His election was contested before the Commission of Elections, which went on to proclaim him the winner on June 10.

=== Tenure ===
During his tenure, Angeles sat on six committees—Agrarian Reform, Justice, Human Rights, Foreign Affairs, Ways and Means, and Urban Planning.

In November 1987, Angeles endorsed a bill seeking cityhood status for Novaliches. In March 1988, Angeles walked out with members of the agrarian reform committee to protest the weakening of a proposed land reform program.

== Personal life ==
Angeles was married to Serabella Angeles. Together, they had two children. They were residents of Calumpang.

== Electoral history ==
Electoral history of Democlito Angeles
Year	Office	Party	Votes received				Result
Year	Office	Party	Total	%	P.	Swing	Result
1987	Representative (Marikina–at-large)	Liberal	7,787 (Note: Partial tally)	40.93%	1st	—N/a	Won

== Notes ==
House of Representatives of the Philippines
Preceded by Emilio de la Paz Jr. (redistricting); Augusto Sanchez (redistricting)	Member of the House of Representatives of the Philippines from Marikina's at-large district 1988–1992	Succeeded by Romeo Candazo
