= Augusto Sanchez (lawyer) =

Filipino lawyer and politician (1932–2003)

Minister of Labor and Employment
- In office February 1986 – January 1987
- President: Corazon Aquino
- Preceded by: Blas Ople
- Succeeded by: Franklin Drilon

Member of the Regular Batasang Pambansa
- In office 1984–1986 Serving with Emilio de la Paz Jr.
- Constituency: Pasig–Marikina

Personal details
- Born: Augusto Santos Sanchez; August 6, 1932 Pasig, Philippines
- Died: February 15, 2003 (aged 70) Metro Manila, Philippines
- Education: San Beda College of Law
- Occupation: Lawyer, politician

Augusto Santos Sanchez (August 6, 1932 – February 15, 2003), commonly known as Bobbit Sanchez, was a Filipino labor leader, and human rights lawyer and politician. An opponent of the administration of Ferdinand Marcos, he was the first chairperson of the Movement of Attorneys for Brotherhood, Integrity, and Nationalism (MABINI), an organization of lawyers that represented political detainees and other victims of human-rights violations.

Sanchez was a delegate to the Philippine Constitutional Convention of 1971, a member of the Regular Batasang Pambansa from 1984 to 1986, and minister of labor and employment under President Corazon Aquino from 1986 to 1987. He ran for senator in the May 1987 election, and ranked one place below the winning 24 candidates; he filed a recount petition and challenged the 24th-place win of Juan Ponce Enrile, with the election concluding in August after the Supreme Court issued its Sanchez vs. Comelec ruling to dismiss the petition.

== Early life and legal career ==
Sanchez was born on August 6, 1932, in Pasig, then a municipality of Rizal. He studied law at San Beda College of Law.

Sanchez began practicing law during the early 1960s at the law office of Jovito Salonga. He later established a private practice specializing in labor law and the representation of workers. He also published and edited a weekly newspaper in Pasig called the Weekly Post. Its criticism of local politicians led some of its opponents to refer to it as the “Weekly Pest”.

== Opposition to the Marcos administration ==
Sanchez was elected in 1970 as a delegate to the Constitutional Convention that convened the following year. He represented the second congressional district of Rizal, which included Pasig. After Marcos declared martial law in September 1972, Sanchez went into hiding for a period before resuming his law practice.

Sanchez subsequently helped organize MABINI and served as its first chairperson. The organization represented political detainees and people alleging abuses by government authorities during the Marcos administration. A fact-finding report published by the Australian Section of the International Commission of Jurists identified MABINI as one of the principal Philippine organizations providing free legal assistance to poor people and defendants in political and national-security cases during this period. Sanchez also participated in demonstrations opposing the Marcos government.

Following the assassination of opposition leader Benigno Aquino Jr. in 1983, Sanchez ran in the 1984 Philippine parliamentary election. He was elected to represent the Pasig–Marikina district in the Regular Batasang Pambansa and served until the body was dissolved in 1986.

== Minister of labor and employment ==
After the People Power Revolution and the installation of Corazon Aquino as president in February 1986, Sanchez was appointed minister of labor and employment. His appointment reflected his connections with labor organizations and groups that had opposed the Marcos administration.

Sanchez's tenure attracted criticism from some military, business and labor groups, which variously accused him of being too closely aligned with left-wing organizations or with particular sections of the labor movement.

One labor dispute handled during his tenure was later considered by the Supreme Court of the Philippines in UERM Employees Union–FFW v. Minister of Labor. The Court dismissed the union's petition and found no evidence that Sanchez had given the employer an unfair advantage. It nevertheless criticized the handling and premature release of an earlier decision and stated that Sanchez should have refrained from deciding the dispute because his brother was a member of the employer's negotiating panel.

President Aquino accepted Sanchez's resignation in December 1986 during a reorganization of her Cabinet. In his resignation letter, Sanchez said that the controversy over his remaining in office was contributing to political polarization. Aquino allowed him to remain until the end of the year, after which he was succeeded by his undersecretary, Franklin Drilon.

== 1987 Senate election and later work ==
Sanchez ran for the Senate in the 1987 Philippine Senate election. He disputed the counting of ballots that contained only the surname “Sanchez”, arguing that election officials could not determine whether they referred to him or another candidate with the same surname.

The Commission on Elections initially considered a recount, but the Supreme Court ruled that the request had been made too late and directed election officials to proclaim Juan Ponce Enrile as the winner of the final Senate seat.

Following the election, Sanchez returned to private legal practice and continued representing workers and people alleging government abuse. He also participated in the movement opposing the continued presence of United States military bases in the Philippines.

== Death and recognition ==
Sanchez died of a heart attack on February 15, 2003, at a hospital in the Philippines. He was 70. The Bantayog ng mga Bayani Foundation records his place of death as Metro Manila.

In 2004, Sanchez was posthumously honored by the Bantayog ng mga Bayani, a memorial dedicated to people who opposed the Marcos dictatorship.

== Electoral history ==
Electoral history of Augusto Sanchez
| Year | Office | Party | Votes received | | | | Result |
| Year | Office | Party | Total | % | P. | Swing | Result |
|---|---|---|---|---|---|---|---|
| 1984 | Assemblyman (Pasig–Marikina) | UNIDO | 148,321 | —N/a | 1st | —N/a | Won |
| 1987 | Senator of the Philippines | LABAN | 7,891,932 | 34.71% | 25th | —N/a | Lost |
