= Bukidnon's at-large congressional district =

Legislative district of the Philippines

Bukidnon's at-large congressional district refers to the lone congressional district of the Philippines in the province of Bukidnon. It existed between 1935 and 1986 as either a single or plural member constituency for several national legislatures.

Bukidnon was first created as a subprovince of Agusan in 1907 from the territory of the Buquidnones that was previously unorganized spanning the Spanish politico-military districts of Misamis and Cotabato. It was admitted as a special province in 1914 under the direct control and jurisdiction of the Department of Mindanao and Sulu whose representatives to the national legislature were appointed by the Governor General as one at-large district beginning with the 4th Philippine Legislature in 1916. Following the passage of the Tydings–McDuffie Act in 1934, a delegate from the province was elected for the first time to the Philippine constitutional convention held in the same year. The province then began to send a representative to the Commonwealth National Assembly the following year from its single-member at-large district created under the 1935 constitution.

Bukidnon was also represented in the Second Republic National Assembly during the Pacific War. It returned to a single-member constituency for the restored House of Representatives in both the Commonwealth Congress and all seven meetings of the Third Philippine Republic Congress until 1972. The district was last contested at the 1984 Philippine parliamentary election and was eliminated following the 1987 apportionment under a new constitution.

== Representation history ==
#	Term of office		National Assembly	Single seat							
#	Start	End	National Assembly	Image	Member	Party	Electoral history				
=== Bukidnon's at-large district for the National Assembly (Commonwealth of the Philippines) ===
District created February 8, 1935 from Mindanao and Sulu's at-large district.
1	September 16, 1935	December 30, 1941	1st		Manuel Fortich	Nacionalista; Democrático	Elected in 1935.				
1	September 16, 1935	December 30, 1941	2nd		Manuel Fortich	Nacionalista	Re-elected in 1938.				
#	Term of office		National Assembly	Seat A				Seat B			
#	Start	End	National Assembly	Image	Member	Party	Electoral history	Image	Member	Party	Electoral history
=== Bukidnon's at-large district for the National Assembly (Second Philippine Republic) ===
District re-created September 7, 1943.
–	September 25, 1943	February 2, 1944	3rd		Pedro Carrillo	KALIBAPI	Elected in 1943.		Antonio Rubin	KALIBAPI	Appointed as an ex officio member.
#	Term of office		Common wealth Congress	Single seat				Seats eliminated			
#	Start	End	Common wealth Congress	Image	Member	Party	Electoral history	Seats eliminated			
=== Bukidnon's at-large district for the House of Representatives of the Commonwealth of the Philippines ===								Seats eliminated			
District re-created May 24, 1945.								Seats eliminated			
(1)	–	–	1st		Manuel Fortich	Nacionalista	Re-elected in 1941. Died before start of term.	Seats eliminated			
#	Term of office		Congress	Single seat				Seats eliminated			
#	Start	End	Congress	Image	Member	Party	Electoral history	Seats eliminated			
=== Bukidnon's at-large district for the House of Representatives of the Philippines ===								Seats eliminated			
2	May 25, 1946	October 12, 1946	1st		Carlos A. Fortich	Liberal	Elected in 1946. Died in office.	Seats eliminated			
3	March 11, 1947	December 30, 1949	1st		Remedios Ozámiz Fortich	Liberal	Elected in 1947 to finish her husband's term.	Seats eliminated			
4	December 30, 1949	March 3, 1960	2nd		Cesar M. Fortich	Liberal	Elected in 1949.	Seats eliminated			
4	December 30, 1949	March 3, 1960	3rd		Cesar M. Fortich	Nacionalista	Re-elected in 1953.	Seats eliminated			
4	December 30, 1949	March 3, 1960	4th		Cesar M. Fortich	Nacionalista	Re-elected in 1957. Resigned on appointment as Secretary of Agriculture and Natural Resources.	Seats eliminated			
–	March 3, 1960	September 15, 1961	4th	vacant		–	No special election held to fill vacancy.	Seats eliminated			
(4)	September 15, 1961	December 30, 1965	4th		Cesar M. Fortich	Nacionalista	Returned to office upon resignation as Secretary of Agriculture and Natural Resources.	Seats eliminated			
(4)	September 15, 1961	December 30, 1965	5th		Cesar M. Fortich	Nacionalista	Re-elected in 1961.	Seats eliminated			
5	December 30, 1965	December 30, 1969	6th		Benjamin N. Tabios	Liberal	Elected in 1965.	Seats eliminated			
(4)	December 30, 1969	September 23, 1972	7th		Cesar M. Fortich	Nacionalista	Elected in 1969. Removed from office after imposition of martial law.	Seats eliminated			
District dissolved into the nine-seat Region X's at-large district for the Interim Batasang Pambansa.								Seats eliminated			
#	Term of office		Batasang Pambansa	Seat A				Seat B			
#	Start	End	Batasang Pambansa	Image	Member	Party	Electoral history	Image	Member	Party	Electoral history
=== Bukidnon's at-large district for the Regular Batasang Pambansa ===
District re-created February 1, 1984.
–	July 23, 1984	March 25, 1986	2nd		Lorenzo S. Dinlayan	KBL	Elected in 1984.		Jose Maria Zubiri Jr.	KBL	Elected in 1984.
District dissolved into Bukidnon's 1st, 2nd and 3rd districts.

== See also ==
- Legislative districts of Bukidnon
