= Emilio de la Paz Jr. =

Filipino lawyer

Deputy Minister of Justice
- In office July 9, 1986 – 1989
- Appointed by: Corazon Aquino

Member of the Regular Batasang Pambansa from Pasig–Marikina
- In office June 30, 1984 – March 25, 1986 Serving with Augusto Sanchez
- Preceded by: District established
- Succeeded by: Democlito Angeles (redistricting); Rufino Javier (redistricting)

Personal details
- Born: Emilio Nuñez de la Paz Jr. December 29, 1922 Philippines
- Died: July 15, 1999 (aged 76) Mandaluyong, Philippines
- Party: UNIDO (1984–1986)
- Spouse: Leonida Ocampo de la Paz
- Children: 8
- Education: University of Santo Tomas (LL.B.)

Emilio Nuñez de la Paz Jr. (December 29, 1922 – July 15, 1999) was a Filipino lawyer and politician who served as the assemblyman for Pasig–Marikina's at-large district alongside Augusto Sanchez from 1984 to 1986. A member of the United Nationalist Democratic Organization, he previously served as the dean of the College of Law at the Lyceum of the Philippines University.

== Early life and education ==
De la Paz was born in 1922 to politician and Spanish-language journalist Emilio de la Paz Sr. (1895–1951) from Marikina, Rizal, and Maria Nuñez. Both his uncle and his cousin, Wenceslao de la Paz and Enrique de la Paz, respectively, served as mayors of Marikina, the former from 1931 to 1938 and the latter in 1945.

De la Paz graduated from the Ateneo de Manila High School in 1940, and earned a Bachelor of Laws from the University of Santo Tomas.

== Legal career ==
In the 1960s, de la Paz served as dean of the College of Law at the Lyceum of the Philippines University. In 1971, de la Paz and journalist-lawyer Augusto "Bobbit" Sanchez served as delegates in the 1971 Constitutional Convention, where they represented the second district of Rizal.

== Assemblyman of Pasig–Marikina (1984–1986) ==
In 1984, during the dictatorship of President Ferdinand Marcos, de la Paz was invited to run alongside Bobbit Sanchez in the Batasang Pambansa (transl. National Assembly) election for assemblyman of the district of Pasig–Marikina under the UNIDO electoral opposition alliance, but was hesitant to become a candidate due to his lack of funds. Barangay captain Harry Singh of Marikina Heights and his two colleagues attempted to convince him further, but when he remained unmoved, they decided to file a certificate of candidacy with the Commission on Elections (COMELEC) in de la Paz's name, which they later presented to de la Paz to finally persuade him to run. During an UNIDO-Laban party meeting, former Marikina councilor Rodolfo B. Valentino became his campaign manager while Singh became his tactician.

Both de la Paz and Sanchez won their seats representing the district of Pasig–Marikina, defeating candidates Danny Floro and Dindo Fernando, who both ran under the Kilusang Bagong Lipunan (KBL; transl. New Society Movement), the administration party established by President Marcos. As an assemblyman, de la Paz made Singh his chief of staff.

== Department of Justice ==
In early 1986, after the ouster of President Marcos and his family in the People Power Revolution, de la Paz was appointed by President Corazon Aquino as an undersecretary at the Ministry of Justice (later the Department of Justice). On July 9, 1986, de la Paz was sworn in as deputy minister of justice. Barangay captain Harry Singh later credited de la Paz with recommending Rodolfo Valentino's appointment as mayor of Marikina to President Aquino in 1986.

As an undersecretary of justice during the Aquino administration, de la Paz assisted political detainees from the Marcos dictatorship in seeking legal recourse for their criminal charges.
