= Legislative district of Malabon–Navotas–Valenzuela =

Former legislative district located in Manila, Philippines

The Legislative district of Malabon–Navotas–Valenzuela was the combined representation of the Metropolitan Manila municipalities of Malabon, Navotas and Valenzuela in the Regular Batasang Pambansa from 1984 to 1986.

== History ==
Prior to gaining joint representation, areas now under the respective jurisdictions of Malabon and Navotas were represented under the provinces of Manila (1898–1899) and Rizal (1907–1972), and Valenzuela under Bulacan (1898–1899; 1907–1972). These three municipalities were separated from their respective provinces to form the Metropolitan Manila Area on 7 November 1975 by virtue of Presidential Decree No. 824; Metro Manila was represented in the Interim Batasang Pambansa as Region IV from 1978 to 1984.

Among the amendments to the 1973 Constitution of the Philippines which were approved in the January 1984 plebiscite was a new apportionment ordinance for the election of Regular Batasang Pambansa members, as embodied in Batas Pambansa Blg. 643. Under this apportionment ordinance, the municipalities of Malabon, Navotas and Valenzuela were grouped into a single parliamentary district which was allotted two representatives, who were elected at large in the May 1984 elections. The combined representation of the three municipalities lasted until the abolition of the Regular Batasang Pambansa in the aftermath of the People Power Revolution in 1986.

Under the new Constitution which was proclaimed on 11 February 1987, Malabon and Navotas were combined to form the congressional district of Malabon–Navotas, while Valenzuela formed its own congressional district. Each elected its member to the restored House of Representatives starting that same year.

== At-Large (defunct) ==
Period	Representatives	Constituents
Regular Batasang Pambansa; 1984–1986	Manuel C. Domingo	Malabon, Navotas, Valenzuela
Regular Batasang Pambansa; 1984–1986	Jesus T. Tanchanco	Malabon, Navotas, Valenzuela

== See also ==
- Legislative districts of Bulacan
- Legislative districts of Rizal
- Legislative district of Malabon-Navotas
  - Legislative district of Malabon
  - Legislative district of Navotas
- Legislative district of Valenzuela
