= Legislative district of Taguig–Pateros–Muntinlupa =

Filipino legislative district

The Legislative district of Taguig–Pateros–Muntinlupa was the combined representation of the Metropolitan Manila municipalities of Muntinlupa, Pateros and Taguig in the Regular Batasang Pambansa from 1984 to 1986.

== History ==
Prior to gaining joint representation, areas now under the respective jurisdictions of Taguig, Pateros and Muntinlupa were represented under the provinces of Manila (1898–1899) and Rizal (1907–1972). These three municipalities were separated from the latter to form the Metropolitan Manila Area on 7 November 1975 by virtue of Presidential Decree No. 824; Metro Manila was represented in the Interim Batasang Pambansa as Region IV from 1978 to 1984.

Among the amendments to the 1973 Constitution of the Philippines which were approved in the January 1984 plebiscite was a new apportionment ordinance for the election of Regular Batasang Pambansa members, as embodied in Batas Pambansa Blg. 643. Under this apportionment ordinance, the municipalities of Muntinlupa, Pateros and Taguig were grouped into a single parliamentary district which was allotted one representative, who was elected at large in the May 1984 elections. The combined representation of the two municipalities lasted until the abolition of the Regular Batasang Pambansa in the aftermath of the People Power Revolution in 1986.

Under the new Constitution which was proclaimed on 11 February 1987, Pateros and Taguig constituted the congressional district of Pateros–Taguig, while Muntinlupa was combined with Las Piñas to form the congressional district of Las Piñas-Muntinlupa. Each elected its member to the restored House of Representatives starting that same year.

== At-Large (defunct) ==
Period	Representative
Regular Batasang Pambansa; 1984–1986	Renato L. Cayetano

== See also ==
- Legislative districts of Rizal
- Legislative district of Las Piñas–Muntinlupa
  - Legislative district of Muntinlupa
- Legislative district of Pateros–Taguig
  - Legislative district of Taguig
