= Dominador Aytona =

Filipino politician and lawyer

The Honorable Dominador Aytona
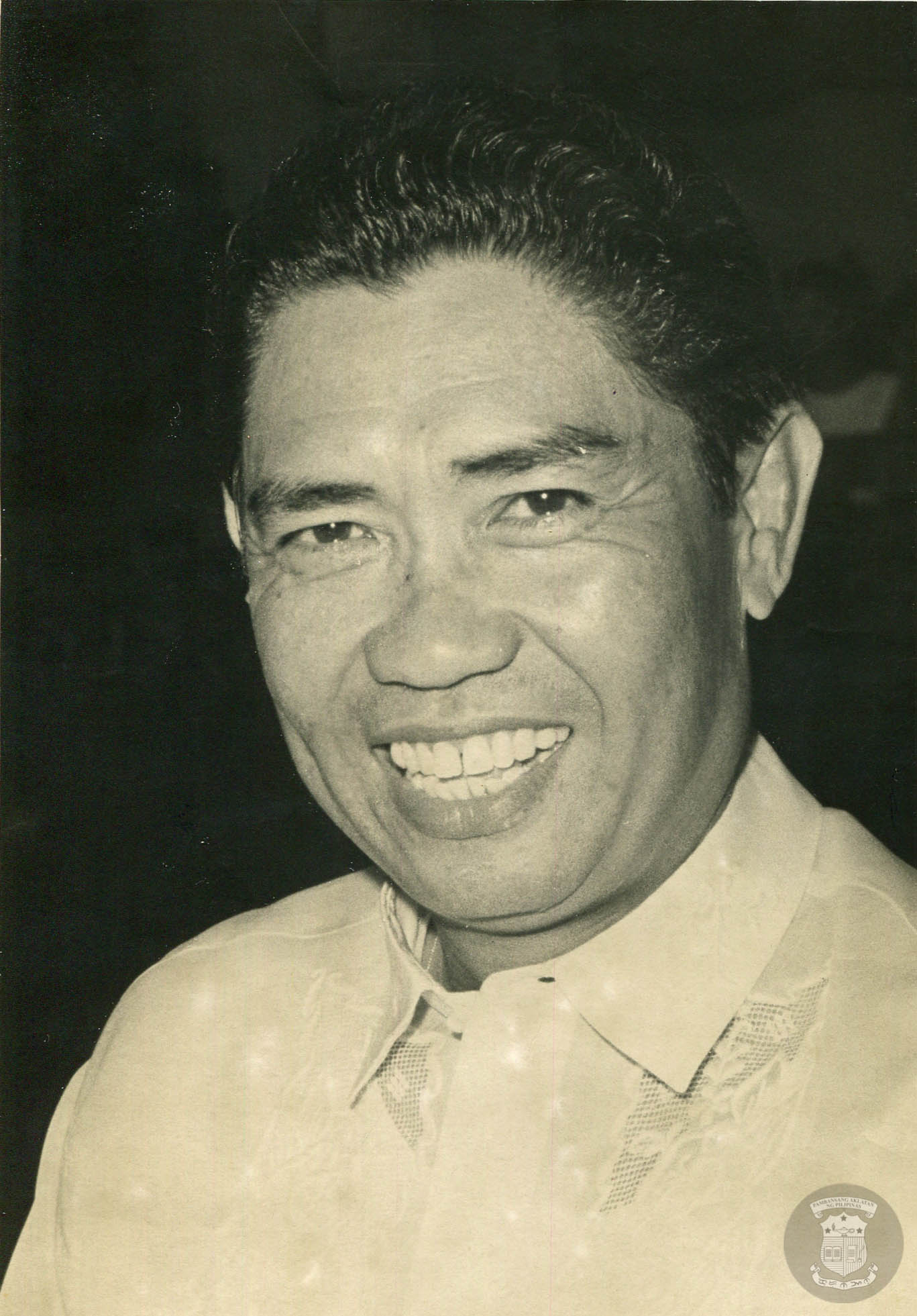

Senator of the Philippines
- In office December 30, 1965 – December 30, 1971

Secretary of Finance
- In office January 25, 1960 – December 30, 1961
- President: Carlos P. Garcia
- Preceded by: Jaime Hernandez
- Succeeded by: Fernando Sison

Personal details
- Born: May 23, 1918 Libon, Albay, Philippine Islands
- Died: September 26, 2017 (aged 99)
- Party: Nacionalista
- Education: University of Manila (BBA, LL.B, LL.M)
- Profession: teacher, lawyer

Dominador Rosauro Aytona (23 May 1918 – 26 September 2017) was a Filipino politician and lawyer.

== Early life and education ==
Aytona was a native of Libon, Albay, born to Jose Ataviado Aytona and Vivencia Cerdon Rosauro. He attended the Albay Training Department and the Albay Normal School and worked as a teacher before earning a bachelor's degree in business administration from the University of Manila in 1947. He earned an LL.B and LL.M from UM in 1949 and 1951 respectively.

== Career ==
Aytona began working for the Senate of the Philippines as a financial adviser in 1950. In 1954, he became Commissioner of the Budget under president Ramon Magsaysay. Magsaysay's successor Carlos P. Garcia named Aytona Secretary of Finance in 1960. After stepping down from that post in 1961, Aytona served in the Senate of the Philippines between 1965 and 1971.
