= 1984 Philippine parliamentary election =

2nd parliamentary elections in the Philippines

- May 14, 1984

197 (of the 200) seats in the Regular Batasang Pambansa 99 seats needed for a majority
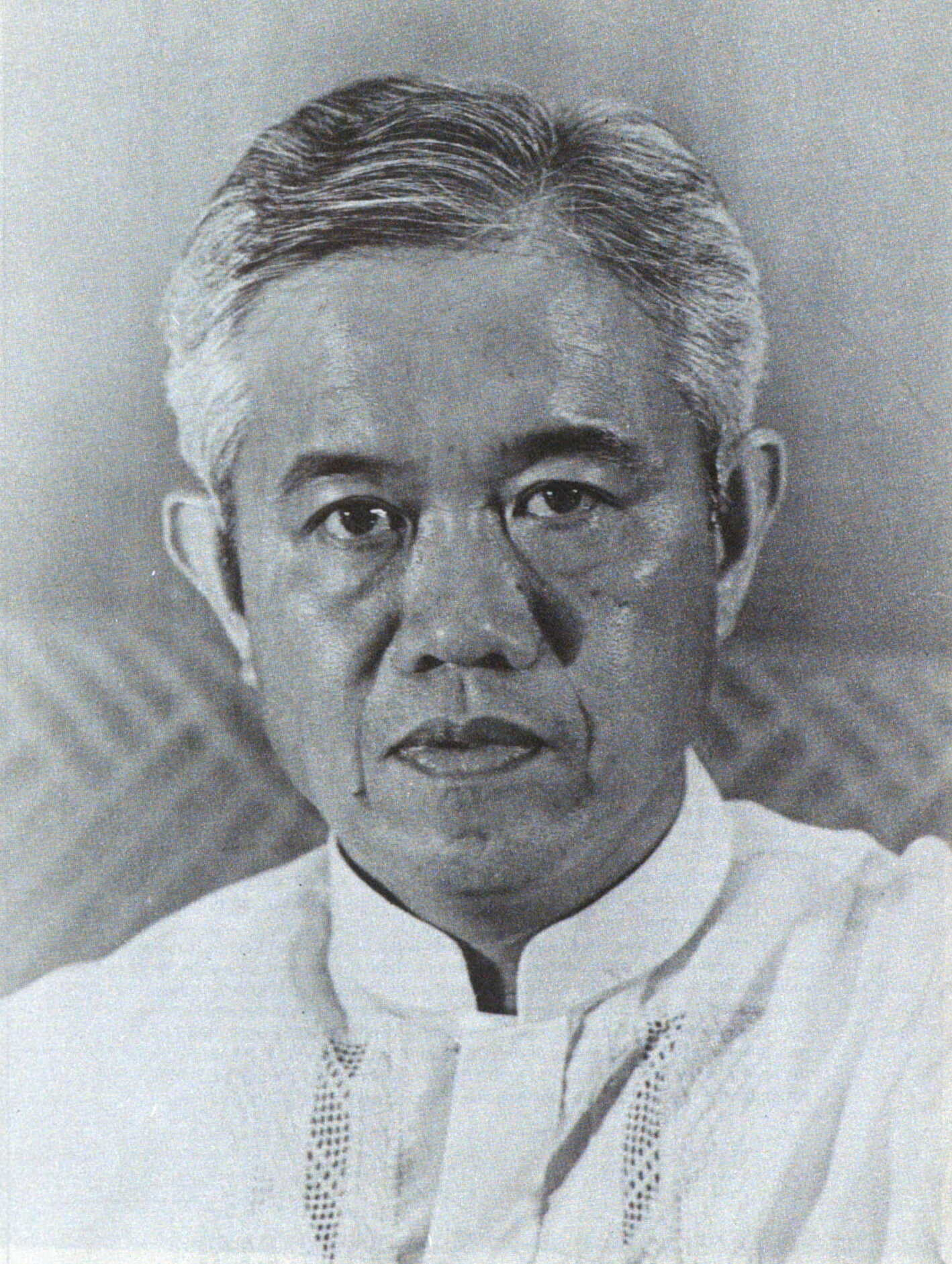

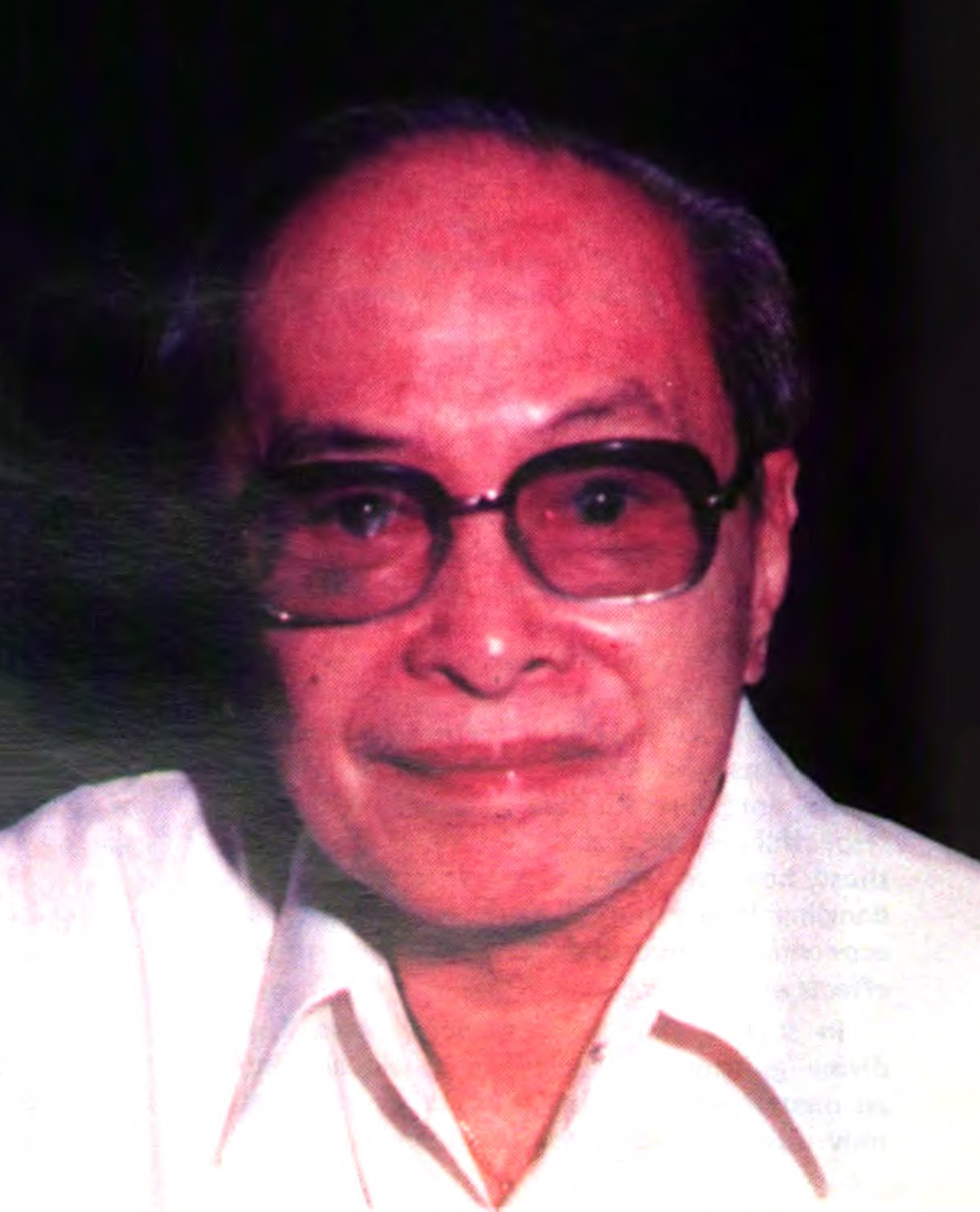
	Majority party	Minority party
Leader	Cesar Virata	Jose Laurel Jr.
Party	KBL	UNIDO
Leader's seat	Cavite	Batangas
Last election	150 seats, 71.13%	new party
Seats won	110	35
Seat change	▼40	▲35
Popular vote	27,237,315	20,352,815
Percentage	46.01	34.38
Swing	▼25.12	▲34.38
- Results by province or city
Prime Minister before election
Cesar Virata
KBL
Prime Minister-designate
Cesar Virata
KBL

A parliamentary election was held in the Philippines on May 14, 1984. Like past elections, charges of bribery, protests and complaints on irregularities marred the elections. Former Manila Times publisher Chino Roces and former senator and opposition leader Jose W. Diokno supported the campaign boycotting the election. The National Movement for Free Elections (NAMFREL) helped mitigate electoral fraud during the election.

The ruling Kilusang Bagong Lipunan (KBL) retained a majority in parliament, but the opposition United Nationalist Democratic Organization (UNIDO) made massive gains, winning 60 seats and reducing the KBL's majority to 114 compared to the 150 they had in 1978. This was the first Philippine election to happen after the end of the controversial martial law period from 1972 to 1981.

The opposition's success was due in most part to the public fallout after the assassination of Benigno Aquino Jr. on August 21, 1983. His murder exposed an increasingly incapable administration under President Ferdinand Marcos, exposing serious corruption and nepotism within, including from Marcos' wife Imelda, as well as exposing Marcos' worsening health at that time. As a result of Aquino's assassination and subsequent investigation, the political opposition became more widespread and united, rallying behind his widow Corazon Aquino. The economy was also in crisis with severe poverty and debt dragging down growth, which was attributed to the Reagan administration's decision to distance itself from Marcos following Aquino's death, resulting in fewer investments that boosted the regime earlier before.

The gains from UNIDO, among other factors would force Marcos to call for the 1986 snap presidential election, which would ultimately see him ousted following accusations of fraud, leading to Corazon Aquino becoming president.

== Electoral system ==
The Batasang Pambansa has not more than 200 members, of which 183 are elected via multi-member districts via plurality block vote, similar to the Philippine Senate elections in the past. Each province or city corresponds to a parliamentary district, with the number of seats dependent on the province's or city's population, with each province guaranteed at least 1 seat..

An additional 14 members are reserved for sectoral seats. There are three sectors: agricultural labor, industrial labor, and youth, each having 1 seat each from Visayas and Mindanao, 2 seats for Luzon, and the youth sector having an additional 2 seats elected at-large. The seats are determined by electoral college within each sector, with the electoral colleges voting via first-past-the-post system.

Finally, the president may choose members of the Cabinet to be members.

== Background ==
After the assassination of opposition leader Senator Benigno Aquino Jr. in 1983, the opposition ran for the Regular Batasang Pambansa under the United Nationalist Democratic Organization (UNIDO) and the Partido Demokratiko Pilipino-Lakas ng Bayan (PDP–Laban) against the ruling Kilusang Bagong Lipunan of Ferdinand Marcos.

== Redistricting ==
Reapportionment (redistricting) is carried out by the Batasang Pambansa (transl. National Legislature). Voting for Interim Batasang Pambansa in 1978 was via multi-member districts based on the then newly established regions, via plurality block voting.

In January 1984, a plebiscite asked the voters to revert the Batasang Pambansa's representation via provinces and cities, as last seen in 1972. The voters approved the proposal, and the Interim Batasang Pambansa passed Batas Pambansa Bilang (transl. National Law No.) 697 reinstituting representation by province and city. This means the regional at-large districts have been divided as follows:

- Division of 12-seat Region I's at-large district to 16 seats
  - Abra's at-large district (1 seat)
  - Baguio's at-large district (1 seat)
  - Benguet's at-large district (1 seat)
  - Ilocos Norte's at-large district (2 seats)
  - Ilocos Sur's at-large district (2 seats)
  - La Union's at-large district (2 seats)
  - Mountain Province's at-large district (1 seat)
  - Pangasinan's at-large district (6 seats)
- Division of 7-seat Region II's at-large district to 11 seats
  - Batanes's at-large district (1 seat)
  - Cagayan's at-large district (3 seats)
  - Ifugao's at-large district (1 seat)
  - Isabela's at-large district (3 seats)
  - Kalinga-Apayao's at-large district (1 seat)
  - Nueva Vizcaya's at-large district (1 seat)
  - Quirino's at-large district (1 seat)
- Division of 16-seat Region III's at-large district to 18 seats
  - Bataan's at-large district (1 seat)
  - Bulacan's at-large district (4 seats)
  - Nueva Ecija's at-large district (4 seats)
  - Olongapo's at-large district (1 seat)
  - Pampanga's at-large district (4 seats)
  - Tarlac's at-large district (3 seats)
  - Zambales's at-large district (1 seat)
- Division of 20-seat Region IV's at-large district to 19 seats
  - Caloocan's at-large district (2 seats)
  - Las Piñas–Parañaque's at-large district (1 seat)
  - Makati's at-large district (1 seat)
  - Malabon–Navotas–Valenzuela's at-large district (1 seat)
  - Manila's at-large district (6 seats)
  - Pasay's at-large district (1 seat)
  - Pasig–Marikina's at large district (1 seat)
  - Quezon City's at-large district (4 seats)
  - San Juan–Mandaluyong's at large district (1 seat)
  - Taguig–Pateros–Muntinglupa's at-large district (1 seat)
- Division of 19-seat Region IV–A's at-large district to 24 seats
  - Aurora's at-large district (1 seat)
  - Batangas's at-large district (4 seats)
  - Cavite's at-large district (3 seats)
  - Laguna's at-large district (4 seats)
  - Marinduque's at-large district (1 seat)
  - Occidental Mindoro's at-large district (1 seat)
  - Oriental Mindoro's at-large district (2 seats)
  - Palawan's at-large district (1 seat)
  - Quezon's at-large district (4 seats)
  - Rizal's at-large district (2 seats)
  - Romblon's at-large district (1 seat)
- Division of 12-seat Region V's at-large district to 13 seats
  - Albay's at-large district (3 seats)
  - Camarines Norte's at-large district (1 seat)
  - Camarines Sur's at-large district (4 seats)
  - Catanduanes's at-large district (1 seat)
  - Masbate's at-large district (2 seats)
  - Sorsogon's at-large district (2 seats)
- Division of 16-seat Region VI's at-large district to 16 seats
  - Aklan's at-large district (1 seat)
  - Antique's at-large district (1 seat)
  - Capiz's at-large district (2 seats)
  - Guimaras's at-large district (1 seat)
  - Iloilo's at-large district (5 seats)
  - Negros Occidental's at-large district (7 seats)
- Division of 13-seat Region VII's at-large district to 15 seats
  - Bohol's at-large district (3 seats)
  - Cebu's at-large district (6 seats)
  - Cebu City's at-large district (2 seats)
  - Negros Oriental's at-large district (3 seats)
  - Siquijor's at-large district (1 seat)
- Division of 10-seat Region VIII's at-large district to 10 seats
  - Biliran's at-large district (1 seat)
  - Eastern Samar's at-large district (1 seat)
  - Leyte's at-large district (5 seats)
  - Northern Samar's at-large district (1 seat)
  - Samar's at-large district (2 seats)
  - Southern Leyte's at-large district (1 seat)
- Division of 8-seat Region IX's at-large district to 9 seats
  - Basilan's at-large district (1 seat)
  - Sulu's at-large district (1 seat)
  - Tawi-Tawi's at-large district (1 seat)
  - Zamboanga City's at-large district (1 seat)
  - Zamboanga del Norte's at-large district (2 seats)
  - Zamboanga del Sur's at-large district (2 seats)
  - Zamboanga Sibugay's at-large district (1 seat)
- Division of 9-seat Region X's at-large district to 10 seats
  - Agusan del Norte's at-large district (1 seat)
  - Agusan del Sur's at-large district (1 seat)
  - Bukidnon's at-large district (2 seats)
  - Cagayan de Oro's at-large district (1 seat)
  - Camiguin's at-large district (1 seat)
  - Dinagat Islands's at-large district (1 seat)
  - Misamis Occidental's at-large district (1 seat)
  - Misamis Oriental's at-large district (2 seats)
  - Surigao del Norte's at-large district (1 seat)
- Division of 10-seat Region XI's at-large district to 13 seats
  - Surigao del Sur's at-large district (1 seat)
  - Davao City's at-large district (2 seats)
  - Davao del Norte's at-large district (3 seats)
  - Davao del Sur's at-large district (1 seat)
  - Davao Occidental's at-large district (1 seat)
  - Davao Oriental's at-large district (2 seats)
  - Sarangani's at-large district (1 seat)
  - South Cotabato's at-large district (2 seats)
- Division of 8-seat Region XII's at-large district to 9 seats
  - Iligan's at-large district (1 seat)
  - Lanao del Norte's at-large district (1 seat)
  - Lanao del Sur's at-large district (2 seats)
  - Maguindanao del Norte's at-large district (1 seat)
  - Maguindanao del Sur's at-large district (1 seat)
  - North Cotabato's at-large district (2 seats)
  - Sultan Kudarat's at-large district (1 seat)

A total of 17 new seats were disputed.

The number of sectoral representatives were not changed.

== Results ==
Party	Votes	%	±	Seats	±
Kilusang Bagong Lipunan	27,237,315	46.01	−25.12	110	−40
United Nationalist Democratic Organization	20,352,815	34.38	New	35	New
Nacionalista Party	2,084,331	3.52	+3.19	2	0
Kilusang Bagong Lipunan (independent)	1,596,900	2.70	New	4	+4
PDP–Laban	1,344,607	2.27	New	6	+6
Partido Panaghiusa	471,551	0.80	New	1	+1
Social Democratic Party	349,891	0.59	New	0	0
Mindanao Alliance	202,945	0.34	−2.88	1	0
Pusyon Bisaya	161,944	0.27	-4.30	0	−13
United Nationalist Democratic Organization (independent)	140,539	0.24	New	0	0
Liberal Party	127,243	0.21	New	0	0
Pundok Sugboanon (independent)	107,745	0.18	New	0	0
Nacionalista Party (independent)	102,776	0.17	New	0	0
Konsensiya ng Bayan	94,592	0.16	New	0	0
Federal Party of the Philippines	91,082	0.15	New	0	0
Bicol Saro	83,656	0.14	-0.87	0	0
Lapiang Manggagawa	69,007	0.12	New	0	0
Concerned Citizens' Aggrupation	41,735	0.07	-0.59	1	+1
Other parties	191,683	0.32	New	0	0
Independent	4,352,328	7.35	+3.68	6	+5
Coalitions				17	+17
Sectoral seats				14	0
Appointed seats				3	0
Total	59,204,685	100.00	–	200	+10
Registered voters/turnout	24,824,934	83.74			
Source: Teehankee, COMELEC

== See also ==
- Commission on Elections
- Politics of the Philippines
- Philippine elections
- Batasang Pambansa
