= Regular Batasang Pambansa =

27th legislative term of the Philippines

←	Interim Batasang Pambansa	8th Congress	→
- Batasang Pambansa Complex (2010)

Overview
- Term: June 30, 1984 – March 25, 1986
- President: Ferdinand Marcos (until February 25, 1986); Corazon Aquino (from February 25, 1986)
- Vice President: Salvador Laurel (from February 25, 1986)
- Prime Minister: Cesar Virata (until February 25, 1986); Salvador Laurel (from February 25, 1986)
- Deputy Prime Minister: Jose Roño

Batasang Pambansa
- Members: 200
- Speaker: Nicanor Yñiguez
- Speaker pro tempore: Salipada Pendatun (until January 27, 1985); Macacuna Dimaporo (from March 13, 1985)
- Majority leader: Jose Roño
- Minority leader: Jose Laurel Jr.

The Regular Batasang Pambansa (English: Regular National Assembly), or the First Batasang Pambansa, was the meeting of the Batasang Pambansa from the beginning of its session on July 23, 1984 until it was abolished by President Corazon Aquino on March 25, 1986.

== Events ==
=== Marcos impeachment attempt ===
On August 13, 1985, 56 assemblymen signed a resolution calling for the impeachment of President Marcos for graft and corruption, culpable violation of the Constitution, gross violation of his oath of office and other high crimes.

They cited the San Jose Mercury News exposé of the Marcoses' multimillion-dollar investment and property holdings in the United States. The properties allegedly amassed by the First Family were the Crown Building, Lindenmere Estate, and a number of residential apartments (in New Jersey and New York), a shopping center in New York, mansions (in London, Rome and Honolulu), the Helen Knudsen Estate in Hawaii and three condominiums in San Francisco, California.

The Assemblymen also included in the complaint the misuse and misapplication of funds "for the construction of the Film Center, where X-rated and pornographic films are exhibited, contrary to public morals and Filipino customs and traditions".

The impeachment complaint was later dismissed for being insufficient in form and substance.

=== The People Power Revolution ===
The People Power Revolution from February 22–25, 1986 was a series of mostly nonviolent mass demonstrations in the Metro Manila area. The peaceful protests were held after a call by Cardinal Jaime Sin, Archbishop of Manila, for civilian support of rebels, and this led to the fall of Marcos' regime and the installation of Corazon Aquino as president.

=== Abolition ===
On March 25, 1986, President Aquino signed Presidential Proclamation No. 3, known as the "Freedom Constitution". Article I, Section 3 of this provisional constitution abolished the Regular Batasang Pambansa among other things:

Section 3. ARTICLE VIII (The Batasang Pambansa), ARTICLE IX (The Prime Minister and the Cabinet), ARTICLE XVI (Amendments), ARTICLE XVII (Transitory Provisions) and all amendments thereto are deemed superseded by this Proclamation.

== Sessions ==
- First Regular Session: July 23, 1984 – June 7, 1985
- Second Regular Session: July 22, 1985 – March 25, 1986

== Leadership ==
Speaker of the Batasang Pambansa

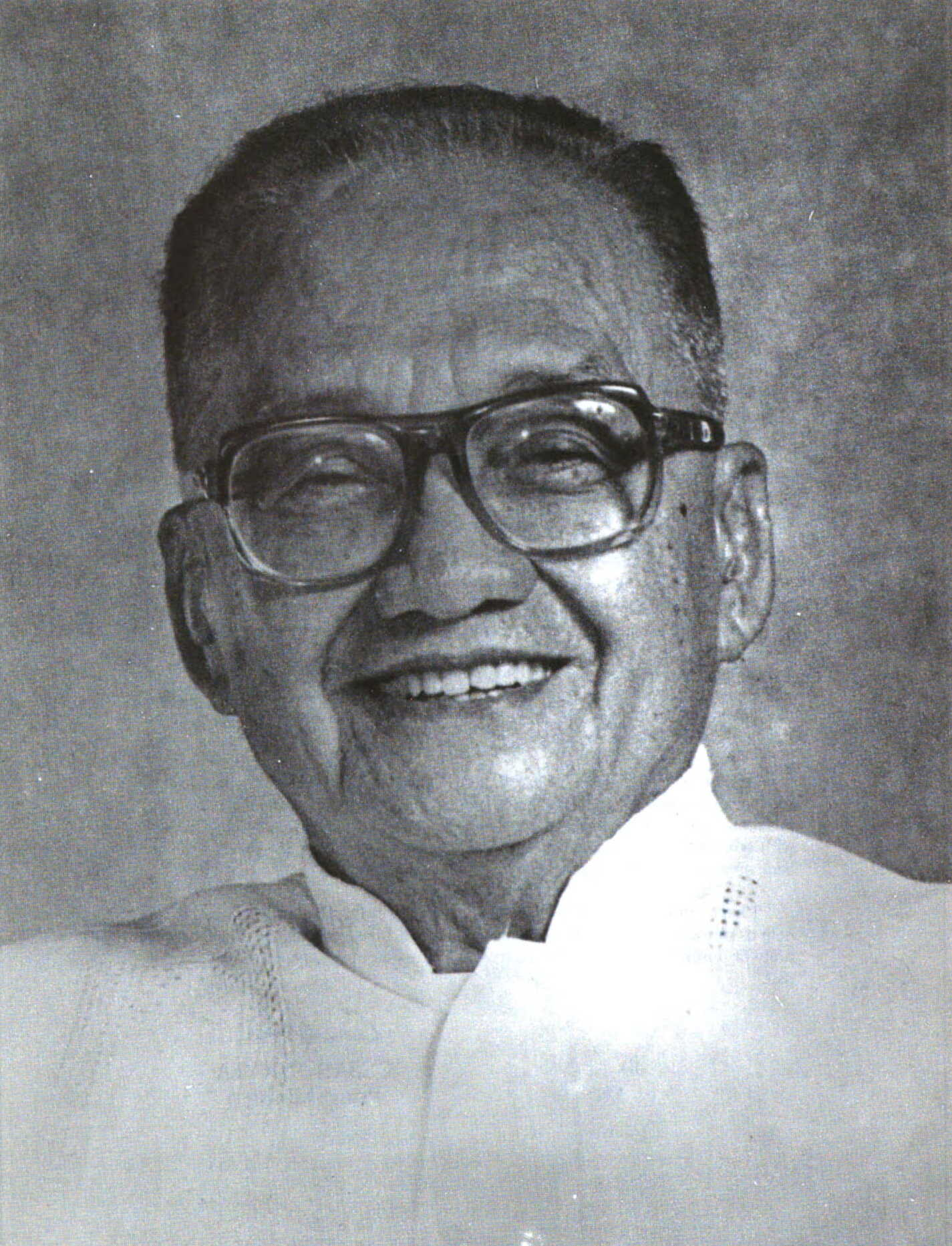
Nicanor Yñiguez

- Prime Minister:
  - Cesar Virata (Cavite, KBL), until February 25, 1986
  - Salvador Laurel (UNIDO), from February 25, 1986
- Deputy Prime Minister: Jose Roño (Samar, KBL)
- Speaker: Nicanor Yñiguez (Southern Leyte, KBL)
- Speaker pro tempore:
  - Salipada Pendatun (Maguindanao, KBL), until January 27, 1985
  - Macacuna Dimaporo (Lanao del Sur, KBL), from March 13, 1985
- Majority leader: Jose Roño (Samar, KBL)
- Minority leader: Jose Laurel Jr. (Batangas, UNIDO)

== Legislation ==
The Regular Batasang Pambansa passed a total of 181 laws: Mga Batas Pambansa Blg. 703 to 884.

=== Major legislation ===
- Batas Pambansa Blg. 877 – Stabilization and Regulation of, Rentals of Certain Residential Units for Other Purposes
- Batas Pambansa Blg. 880 – Public Assembly Act of 1985
- Batas Pambansa Blg. 881 – Omnibus Election Code of the Philippines
- Batas Pambansa Blg. 882 – Order of Succession Act
- Batas Pambansa Blg. 883 – Special Presidential and Vice-Presidential Elections Act
- Batas Pambansa Blg. 884 – Presidential Electoral Tribunal Act

== Members ==
Final composition of the Regular Batasang Pambansa.

Province/City/Sector	Member	Party
Abra	Arturo Barbero	KBL
Agusan del Norte	Edelmiro Amante	Nacionalista
Agusan del Sur	Democrito Plaza	KBL
Aklan	Rafael Legaspi	UNIDO
Albay	Pedro Marcellana Jr.	UNIDO
Albay	Peter Sabido	KBL
Albay	Victor Ziga	UNIDO
Antique	Arturo Pacificador (Note: The Supreme Court set aside Arturo Pacificador's proclamation as the winner of the 1984 election on September 22, 1986.)	KBL
Aurora	Luis Etcubañez	KBL
Baguio	Honorato Aquino	UNIDO
Basilan	Candu Muarip	CCA
Bataan	Antonino Roman	KBL
Batanes	Fernando Faberes	KBL
Batangas	Manuel Collantes	KBL
Batangas	Jose Laurel Jr.	UNIDO
Batangas	Hernando Perez	Nacionalista
Batangas	Rafael Recto	Nacionalista
Benguet	Samuel Dangwa	Independent
Bohol	Eladio Chatto	KBL
Bohol	Ramon Lapez	KBL
Bohol	David Tirol	KBL
Bukidnon	Lorenzo Dinlayan	KBL
Bukidnon	Jose Maria Zubiri Jr.	KBL
Bulacan	Jesus Hipolito	KBL
Bulacan	Rogaciano Mercado	UNIDO
Bulacan	Teodulo Natividad	KBL
Bulacan	Blas Ople	KBL
Cagayan	Antonio Carag	KBL
Cagayan	Juan Ponce Enrile	KBL
Cagayan	Alfonso Reyno Jr.	KBL
Cagayan de Oro	Nene Pimentel	PDP–Laban
Caloocan	Antonio Martinez	PDP–Laban
Caloocan	Virgilio Robles	UNIDO
Camarines Norte	Roy Padilla Sr.	UNIDO
Camarines Sur	Ciriaco Alfelor	UNIDO
Camarines Sur	Rolando Andaya	UNIDO
Camarines Sur	Edmundo B. Cea	UNIDO
Camarines Sur	Luis Villafuerte	UNIDO
Camiguin	Jose Paul Neri	Independent
Capiz	Enrique Belo	Independent
Capiz	Charles Escolin	KBL
Catanduanes	Jose Alberto	KBL
Cavite	Helena Benitez	Independent KBL
Cavite	Renato Dragon	KBL
Cavite	Cesar Virata	KBL
Cebu	Emerito Calderon	KBL
Cebu	Nenita Cortes-Daluz	Panaghiusa
Cebu	Ramon Durano III	KBL
Cebu	Regalado Maambong	KBL
Cebu	Luisito Patalinjug	KBL
Cebu	Adelino Sitoy	KBL
Cebu City	Antonio Cuenco	Panaghiusa
Cebu City	Marcelo Fernan	Panaghiusa
Cotabato	Tomas Baga Jr.	KBL
Cotabato	Carlos Cajelo	KBL
Davao City	Manuel Garcia	KBL
Davao City	Zafiro Respicio	PDP–Laban
Davao del Norte	Rodolfo del Rosario	KBL
Davao del Norte	Rolando Marcial	PDP–Laban
Davao del Norte	Rogelio Sarmiento	KBL
Davao del Sur	Alejandro Almendras	KBL
Davao del Sur	Douglas Cagas	PDP–Laban
Davao Oriental	Merced Edith Rabat	KBL
Eastern Samar	Vicente Valley	KBL
Ifugao	Zosimo Paredes	Independent KBL
Iligan	Camilo Cabili	KBL
Ilocos Norte	Imee Marcos	KBL
Ilocos Norte	Antonio Raquiza	KBL
Ilocos Sur	Salacnib Baterina	KBL
Ilocos Sur	Eric Singson	KBL
Iloilo	Salvador Britanico	KBL
Iloilo	Fermin Caram Jr.	UNIDO
Iloilo	Arthur Defensor Sr.	UNIDO
Iloilo	Narciso Monfort	KBL
Iloilo	Rafael Palmares	Nacionalista
Isabela	Rodolfo Albano Jr.	KBL
Isabela	Prospero Bello	KBL
Isabela	Simplicio Domingo Jr.	KBL
Kalinga-Apayao	David Puzon	KBL
La Union	Jose Aspiras	KBL
La Union	Joaquin L. Ortega	KBL
Laguna	Arturo Brion	KBL
Laguna	Rustico delos Reyes Jr.	PSL
Laguna	Wenceslao Lagumbay	KBL
Laguna	Luis Yulo	KBL
Lanao del Norte	Abdullah Dimaporo	KBL
Lanao del Sur	Omar Dianalan	KBL
Lanao del Sur	Macacuna Dimaporo	KBL
Las Piñas–Parañaque	Jaime Ferrer	UNIDO
Leyte	Damian Aldaba	KBL
Leyte	Artemio Mate	KBL
Leyte	Emiliano Melgazo	KBL
Leyte	Alberto Veloso	KBL
Leyte	Vacant (Note: Member-elect Benjamin Romualdez (KBL) remained as ambassador of the Philippines to the United States.)	
Maguindanao	Simeon Datumanong	KBL
Maguindanao	Salipada Pendatun (Note: Salipada Pendatun died on January 27, 1985.)	KBL
Makati	Ruperto Gaite	KBL
Malabon–Navotas–Valenzuela	Manuel Domingo	UNIDO
Malabon–Navotas–Valenzuela	Jesus Tanchanco	KBL
Manila	Lito Atienza	UNIDO
Manila	Eva Estrada Kalaw	UNIDO
Manila	Carlos Fernando	UNIDO
Manila	Mel Lopez	UNIDO
Manila	Gonzalo Puyat II	UNIDO
Manila	Arturo Tolentino	KBL
Marinduque	Carmencita Reyes	KBL
Masbate	Jolly Fernandez	UNIDO
Masbate	Venancio Yaneza (Note: Venancio Yaneza died on September 9, 1984.)	Independent
Misamis Occidental	Henry Regalado	KBL
Misamis Oriental	Homobono Adaza	Mindanao Alliance
Misamis Oriental	Concordio Diel	KBL
Mountain Province	Victor Dominguez	KBL
Negros Occidental	Wilson Gamboa	UNIDO
Negros Occidental	Antonio Gatuslao	Independent
Negros Occidental	Roberto Gatuslao	KBL
Negros Occidental	Jaime Golez	KBL
Negros Occidental	Alfredo Marañon	KBL
Negros Occidental	Roberto Montelibano	KBL
Negros Occidental	Jose Varela Jr.	KBL
Negros Oriental	Ricardo Abiera	KBL
Negros Oriental	Andres Bustamante	KBL
Negros Oriental	Emilio Macias	KBL
Northern Samar	Edilberto del Valle	KBL
Nueva Ecija	Angel Concepcion	KBL
Nueva Ecija	Leopoldo Diaz	Independent KBL
Nueva Ecija	Mario Garcia	KBL
Nueva Ecija	Eduardo Nonato Joson	KBL
Nueva Vizcaya	Leonardo B. Perez	KBL
Occidental Mindoro	Pedro Mendiola	KBL
Olongapo	Amelia Gordon	KBL
Oriental Mindoro	Rolleo Ignacio	UNIDO
Oriental Mindoro	Jose Reynaldo Morente	KBL
Palawan	Ramon Mitra Jr.	PDP–Laban
Pampanga	Aber Canlas	KBL
Pampanga	Rafael Lazatin	UNIDO
Pampanga	Emigdio Lingad	UNIDO
Pampanga	Juanita Nepomuceno	UNIDO
Pangasinan	Victor Agbayani	Independent KBL
Pangasinan	Gregorio Cedaña	KBL
Pangasinan	Felipe de Vera	KBL
Pangasinan	Demetrio Demetria	UNIDO
Pangasinan	Conrado Estrella Sr.	KBL
Pangasinan	Fabian Sison	UNIDO
Pasay	Jose Conrado Benitez	KBL
Pasig–Marikina	Emilio de la Paz Jr.	UNIDO
Pasig–Marikina	Augusto Sanchez	UNIDO
Quezon	Cesar Bolaños	UNIDO
Quezon	Bienvenido Marquez Jr.	UNIDO
Quezon	Hjalmar Quintana	UNIDO
Quezon	Oscar Santos	UNIDO
Quezon City	Mel Mathay	KBL
Quezon City	Orly Mercado	UNIDO
Quezon City	Cecilia Muñoz-Palma	UNIDO
Quezon City	Alberto Romulo	UNIDO
Quirino	Orlando Dulay	KBL
Rizal	Francisco Sumulong	PDP–Laban
Rizal	Emigdio Tanjuatco Jr.	PDP–Laban
Romblon	Natalio Beltran Jr.	UNIDO
Samar	Jose Roño	KBL
Samar	Fernando Veloso	KBL
San Juan–Mandaluyong	Neptali Gonzales	UNIDO
Siquijor	Manolito Asok	KBL
Sorsogon	Salvador Escudero	KBL
Sorsogon	Augusto Ortiz	KBL
South Cotabato	Rufino Bañas	UNIDO
South Cotabato	Hilario de Pedro	UNIDO
South Cotabato	Rogelio Garcia	UNIDO
Southern Leyte	Nicanor Yñiguez	KBL
Sultan Kudarat	Benjamin Duque	KBL
Sulu	Hussin Loong	KBL
Surigao del Norte	Constantino Navarro Sr.	KBL
Surigao del Sur	Higino Llaguno Jr.	KBL
Taguig–Pateros–Muntinlupa	Rene Cayetano	KBL
Tarlac	Mercedes Cojuangco-Teodoro	KBL
Tarlac	Homobono Sawit	KBL
Tawi-Tawi	Celso Palma	KBL
Zambales	Antonio Diaz	KBL
Zamboanga City	Vacant (Note: Member-elect Cesar Climaco (CCA) declined to take office until his term as mayor of Zamboanga City is completed. He was later assassinated on November 14, 1984.)	
Zamboanga del Norte	Romeo Jalosjos Sr.	Nacionalista
Zamboanga del Norte	Guardson Lood	KBL
Zamboanga del Sur	Vicente Cerilles	KBL
Zamboanga del Sur	Bienvenido Ebarle	KBL
Zamboanga del Sur	Isidoro Real Jr.	CCA
Agricultural Labor	Flores Bayot	Nonpartisan
Agricultural Labor	Jose Bico	Nonpartisan
Agricultural Labor	Luis Taruc	Nonpartisan
Industrial Labor	Eulogio Lerum	Nonpartisan
Youth	Armando Aguja Jr.	Nonpartisan
Youth	Roberto Antonio	Nonpartisan
Youth	Maria Victoria Calderon	Nonpartisan
Youth	Romel Cañete	Nonpartisan
Youth	Edward Chua	Nonpartisan
Youth	Nasser Mustafa	Nonpartisan
Cabinet	Estelito Mendoza	KBL
Cabinet	Roberto Ongpin	KBL
Cabinet	Manuel Alba	KBL

== See also ==
- Congress of the Philippines
- 1984 Philippine parliamentary election
