= United Nationalist Democratic Organization =

Political party in the Philippines founded by Salvador Laurel

- President: Vacant
- Founder: Salvador Laurel
- Founded: January 1980 2021 (revival)
- Dissolved: 1987
- Merger of: PDP–Laban; Liberal; Nacionalista; NUCD; PDSP
- Political position: Big tent (with centre-left factions; 1980–1988)
- Colors: Green, Yellow (only as customary from 2021)
- Slogan: Laban Na! People Power

The United Nationalist Democratic Organization (UNIDO) was the main political multi-party electoral alliance of the traditional political opposition in the Philippines during the turbulent last years of President Ferdinand Marcos in the mid-1980s. Formed in January 1980 as the United Democratic Opposition, it initially comprised eight major and minor political parties and organizations with the main aim of ousting President Marcos through legal political means. In April 1982, the coalition received its present name, and increased its members to twelve parties. Shortly after the August 1983 assassination of popular opposition senator Benigno Aquino Jr., the party was led by Senator Salvador Laurel of Batangas.

== History ==
The political leaders forming UNIDO such as prominent anti-Marcos leaders like former Senator and Batangas Assemblyman Salvador Laurel, former President Diosdado Macapagal, former Senator Edmundo B. Cea, Zamboanga City Mayor Cesar Climaco, Senator Gerardo Roxas, Manila Assemblyman Lito Atienza, Antique Governor Evelio Javier, Mandaluyong Assemblyman Neptali Gonzales, former Pampanga Governor Jose B. Lingad, Senator John Osmeña, Senator Dominador Aytona, Senator and renowned nationalist statesman Lorenzo Tañada, Senator Eva Estrada-Kalaw, Senator Rene Espina, Senator Mamintal Tamano, Senator Domocao Alonto and nephew Abul Kharyl, Assemblyman Rufino Bañas, Assemblyman Raul Gonzales, Assemblyman Homobono Adaza, former Philippine Collegian editor-in-chief and leftist-bent journalist Abe Sarmiento, and all significant personalities that contributed to the fall of the Marcos dictatorship.

The political groups allied with UNIDO were the Partido Demokratiko Pilipino–Lakas ng Bayan (PDP–Laban) represented by Senator Aquilino Pimentel, Jr., Bansang Nagkakaisa sa Diwa at Layunin (BANDILA) led by Agapito Aquino, the younger brother of Ninoy Aquino and co-founder of the August Twenty-One Movement (ATOM).

UNIDO gained momentum in the last week of November 1985, when President Ferdinand Marcos called for a snap presidential election due to mounting political pressure. At first, UNIDO supported Senator Salvador Laurel of Batangas as its standard-bearer, but business tycoon Chino Roces was not convinced that Laurel or Jovito Salonga could defeat Marcos in the polls. Roces argued that Corazon Aquino, widow of assassinated Senator Aquino, should be their presidential candidate. Roces then initiated the Cory Aquino for President Movement (CAPM) to gather one million signatures in one week to urge Aquino to run for president, convincing Aquino to do so. She was made presidential bet of the party Lakas ng Bayan, but Laurel did not yield to Aquino as opposition nominee for president until he was convinced by Archbishop of Manila Cardinal Jaime Sin to be her running mate. Aquino had previously approached Laurel with a deal, wherein she would relinquish her allegiance to PDP–LABAN and run as president with UNIDO, with Laurel running for Vice-president, effectively uniting the opposition groups against Marcos. Conversely, Laurel had also previously offered Aquino the vice-presidential nomination for UNIDO. In any case, Aquino ran for president under the UNIDO banner, with PDP–Laban endorsing the UNIDO coalition.

The campaign was mounted in January 1986, less than a month before the February 7 elections. Although the Commission on Elections (COMELEC) official tally reported Aquino had lost to Marcos, the polls were widely believed to have been fraudulent. Popular, peaceful demonstrations reached a tipping point when Marcos and Aquino claimed victory, and holding rival inaugurations on February 25. With the Armed Forces of the Philippines refusing to crush the protests, Marcos fled to exile in Hawaiʻi marking the success of the People Power Revolution.

UNIDO was dissolved after the 1987 legislative and general elections, when new parties were formed and members parted ways. Among the parties formed from UNIDO, Laban ng Demokratikong Pilipino (LDP) became the dominant party in the Philippine politics until 1992.

=== 1987 Philippine Legislative Elections ===
The Lakas ng Bayan coalition for the elections was composed of PDP–Laban, Lakas ng Bansa, UNIDO, the Liberal Party–Salonga wing, the National Union of Christian Democrats–United Muslim Democrats of the Philippines (NUCD–UMDP), the Philippine Democratic Socialist Party, BANDILA and Panaghiusa.

=== 1988 Crisis ===
The PDP–Laban was split into the Pimentel and Cojuangco wings. The Lakas ng Bansa, headed by Ramon Mitra Jr., and PDP–Laban's Cojuangco wing, joined forces to found a new party that would support President Aquino's programs, the Laban ng Demokratikong Pilipino or LDP, thus shaking the anti-Aquino alliance into confusion.

=== 2021 party revival ===
After a long break of the party, on the year 2021, COMELEC accredited UNIDO as a political entity based in the Southern Tagalog region. It was formally reemerged as a regional political party on April 23, 2022, around two weeks before the May 9, 2022 polls. It was attended by Senator Francis Tolentino, senatorial aspirants Robin Padilla and Gilbert Teodoro, re-electionist Senator Joel Villanueva, as well as AGIMAT party-list representative and Bacoor Mayor Lani Mercado-Revilla. Also present was UNIDO President Jose Laurel IV, nephew of the party's founding chairman. At the said event hold in Manila Yacht Club, the party announced its support for 2022 election candidates Bongbong Marcos for president (son of former President Ferdinand Marcos, whom the party helped oust) and his running mate, Davao City Mayor Sara Duterte in an alliance dubbed UniTeam.

== Electoral performance ==
=== Parliamentary ===
Batasang Pambansa
Election	Leader	Votes		Seats			Position	Government
Election	Leader	No.	Share	No.	±	Share	Position	Government
1984	Jose Laurel Jr.	1,344,607	2.27%	35 / 200	new	34.38%	▲35	KBL

=== Congress ===
House elections	House seats won	Result	Senate seats won	Ticket	Result	Senate elections
1987	19 / 200	Lakas ng Bansa / PDP–Laban plurality	1 / 24	LABAN	LABAN win 22/24 seats	1987 (Note: Participated as members of the Lakas ng Bayan)

== Party leadership history ==
=== Party president ===
President	Term start	Term end
Salvador Laurel	1980	1987
Jose Laurel IV	2021	2025

=== Party chairman ===
Chairman	Term start	Term end
Aquilino Pimentel Jr.	1980	1987

=== Party Secretary General ===
President	Term start	Term end
Salvador Laurel	1980	1987
