= Legislative district of Pasig–Marikina =

Legislative district of the Philippines

The Legislative district of Pasig–Marikina was the combined representation of the Metropolitan Manila municipalities of Pasig and Marikina in the Regular Batasang Pambansa from 1984 to 1986.

== History ==
Prior to gaining joint representation, areas now under the respective jurisdictions of Pasig and Marikina were represented under the provinces of Manila (1898–1899) and Rizal (1907–1972). These two municipalities were separated from the latter to form the Metropolitan Manila Area on 7 November 1975 by virtue of Presidential Decree No. 824; Metro Manila was represented in the Interim Batasang Pambansa as Region IV from 1978 to 1984.

Among the amendments to the 1973 Constitution of the Philippines which were approved in the January 1984 plebiscite was a new apportionment ordinance for the election of Regular Batasang Pambansa members, as embodied in Batas Pambansa Blg. 643. Under this apportionment ordinance, the municipalities of Pasig and Marikina were grouped into a single parliamentary district which was allotted two representatives, who were elected at large in the May 1984 elections. The combined representation of the two municipalities lasted until the abolition of the Regular Batasang Pambansa in the aftermath of the People Power Revolution in 1986.

Under the new Constitution which was proclaimed on February 11, 1987, the two municipalities were separated to form the congressional district of Pasig and the congressional district of Marikina. Each elected its member to the restored House of Representatives starting that same year.

== At-Large (defunct) ==
Period	Representatives
Regular Batasang Pambansa; 1984–1986	Emilio N. de la Paz Jr.
Regular Batasang Pambansa; 1984–1986	Augusto S. Sanchez

== See also ==
- Legislative districts of Rizal
- Legislative district of Pasig
- Legislative district of Marikina
