= 1984 Philippine constitutional plebiscite =

- January 27, 1984

Representation in the Batasang Pambansa to be via districts
| For | 83.94% |
| Against | 16.06% |

Abolishing the Executive Committee and restoring the vice presidency
| For | 82.99% |
| Against | 17.01% |

Allowing indigents to possess public land via grants
| For | 69.25% |
| Against | 30.75% |

Undertaking an urban land reform program
| For | 68.59% |
| Against | 30.75% |

National and local plebiscites for the approval of the proposed constitutional amendments and local bills made by the Interim Batasang Pambansa were held on January 27, 1984, in the Philippines.

== Constitutional amendments ==
The majority of the Filipino people voted "Yes" to the terms and constitutional amendments. But several opposition politicians, like José W. Diokno and Lorenzo M. Tañada, called for a boycott. Below are the constitutional amendments as a result of the plebiscite:

- Creating the Office of the Vice President of the Philippines (OVP)
- Abolishing the Executive Committee
- Elections for the regular members of the Batasang Pambansa by provinces, highly urbanized cities, and districts of Metro Manila
- Land grant and urban housing program

== Results ==
=== On districting the Batasang Pambansa ===
Do you want representation in the Batasang Pambansa to be by province, highly urbanized city, and district (as opposed to by region)?
| Choice | Votes | % |
|---|---|---|
| Yes | 11,353,161 | 83.94 |
| No | 2,171,963 | 16.06 |
| Total | 13,525,124 | 100.00 |
| Valid votes | 13,525,124 | 98.25 |
| Invalid/blank votes | 240,383 | 1.75 |
| Total votes | 13,765,507 | 100.00 |
Source: Proclamation No. 2332, s. 1984

Question #1 of the 1984 Philippine constitutional plebiscite results (excluding invalid votes)
| Yes; 11,353,161 (83.9%) |
▲50%

=== On abolishing the Executive Committee and restoring the vice presidency ===
Do you want to abolish the Executive Committee and restore the vice presidency?
| Choice | Votes | % |
|---|---|---|
| Yes | 11,350,748 | 82.99 |
| No | 2,326,954 | 17.01 |
| Total | 13,677,702 | 100.00 |
| Valid votes | 13,677,702 | 99.36 |
| Invalid/blank votes | 87,805 | 0.64 |
| Total votes | 13,765,507 | 100.00 |
Source: Proclamation No. 2332, s. 1984

Question #2 of the 1984 Philippine constitutional plebiscite results (excluding invalid votes)
| Yes; 11,350,748 (83%) |
▲50%

=== On allowing indigents to possess public lands by grants ===
Do you want to include "grant" as an additional mode for the acquisition of public lands by qualified tenants, farmers, and other landless citizens?
| Choice | Votes | % |
|---|---|---|
| Yes | 9,533,138 | 69.25 |
| No | 4,232,369 | 30.75 |
| Required majority | | 50.00 |
| Total | 13,765,507 | 100.00 |
| Valid votes | 13,765,507 | 100.00 |
| Invalid/blank votes | 0 | 0.00 |
| Total votes | 13,765,507 | 100.00 |
Source: Proclamation No. 2332, s. 1984

Question #3 of the 1984 Philippine constitutional plebiscite results (excluding invalid votes)
| Yes; 9,533,138 (69.3%) | No; 4,232,369 (30.7%) |
▲50%

=== On the state undertaking an urban land reform program ===
Do you approve of the state undertaking an urban land reform program for landless, homeless, or low-income citizens?
| Choice | Votes | % |
|---|---|---|
| Yes | 9,373,596 | 68.59 |
| No | 4,293,297 | 31.41 |
| Required majority | | 50.00 |
| Total | 13,666,893 | 100.00 |
| Valid votes | 13,666,893 | 99.28 |
| Invalid/blank votes | 98,614 | 0.72 |
| Total votes | 13,765,507 | 100.00 |
Source: Proclamation No. 2332, s. 1984

Question #4 of the 1984 Philippine constitutional plebiscite results (excluding invalid votes)
| Yes; 9,373,596 (68.6%) | No; 4,293,297 (31.4%) |
▲50%
