= List of speakers of the House of Representatives of the Philippines =

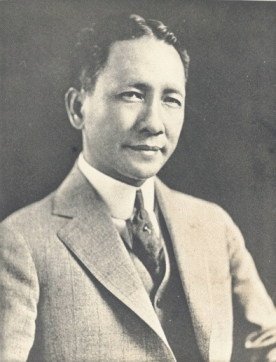
Sergio Osmeña was the first and longest-serving speaker of the House (as the Philippine Assembly) in history.

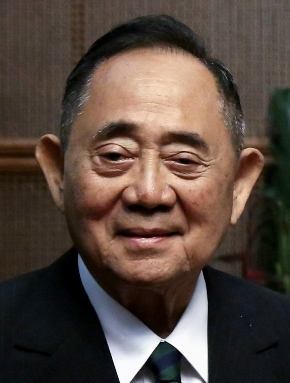
Jose de Venecia Jr. was the longest-serving post-martial law speaker of the House.

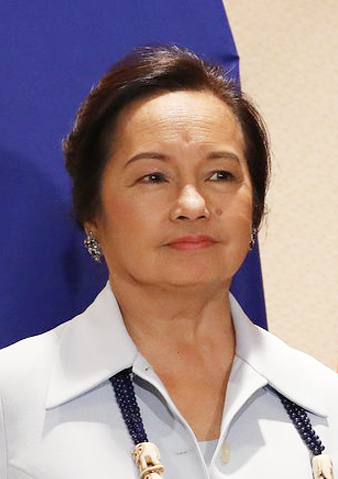
Gloria Macapagal Arroyo is the first female speaker of the House.

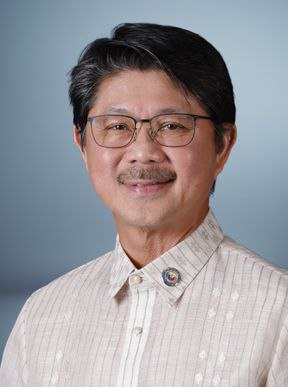
Bojie Dy is the current speaker of the House.

The speaker of the House of Representatives of the Philippines is the presiding officer and the highest-ranking official of the House of Representatives of the Philippines. The office was established in 1907, when the Philippine Assembly was created through the 1902 Philippine Organic Act passed by the United States Congress as the lower house of the Philippine Legislature, with the appointed Philippine Commission as the upper chamber.

The House speaker serves as the administrative head of the chamber and as its main political leader, setting the House's legislative agenda. The speaker is third in the line of succession to the presidency, following the vice president and the president of the Senate.

When the House convenes at the opening of a new Congress, or when the position becomes vacant due to death, resignation, or removal of the incumbent by a leadership coup, the members elect a new speaker by roll call vote. A majority of the votes cast is required for the election. If there is only a single nominee, the candidate may be chosen by acclamation.

In total, 25 representatives have served as speaker of a lower or sole legislative chamber. The incumbent speaker of the House is Bojie Dy, who assumed office on September 17, 2025.

== List of speakers ==
This list also includes the presidents of the Malolos Congress (1898–1899) and speakers of the Philippine Assembly (1907–1916), the Commonwealth National Assembly (1935–1941), the Second Republic National Assembly (1943–1944), and the Batasang Pambansa (1978–1986).

Every speaker has been a member of a political party or faction (Note: Excludes Pedro Paterno who served as President of the Malolos Congress who was unaffiliated with any political party; the Federalista Party, the first political party in the Philippines, would only be established after the Congress was dissolved in 1900.); the number affiliated with each is:

Nacionalista – 9; (Note: Includes the tenures of Manuel Roxas from 1925 to 1928 and Quintín Paredes from 1933 to 1934.) Lakas – 4; (Note: Includes the tenure of Feliciano Belmonte Jr. in 2001.) Liberal – 3; (Note: Includes the tenure of Feliciano Belmonte Jr. from 2010 to 2016.) PDP–Laban – 3; KBL – 2; Nacionalista Democratico – 2; (Note: Includes the tenures of Quintín Paredes from 1934 to 1935 and Gil Montilla from 1935 to 1938.) KALIBAPI – 1; LnB – 1; (Note: Includes the tenure of Ramon Mitra Jr. from 1987 to 1988.) LDP – 1; (Note: Includes the tenure of Ramon Mitra Jr. from 1988 to 1992.) LAMMP – 1; (Note: Includes the tenure of Manny Villar from 1998 to November 3, 2000.) Nacionalista Colectivista – 1; (Note: Includes the tenure of Manuel Roxas from 1922 to 1925.) NPC – 1; PFP – 1; Independent – 1. (Note: Includes the tenure of Manny Villar from November 3 to November 13, 2000.)

=== Malolos Congress (1898–1899) ===
The National Assembly of the Revolutionary Government of the Philippines and later of the First Philippine Republic, historically known as the Malolos Congress, was established in 1898. Pedro Paterno was elected as the first and only president of the Congress.

No.	Portrait	Name (Birth–Death)	Term of office		Party	Legislature
No.	Portrait	Name (Birth–Death)	Took office	Left office	Party	Legislature
—		Pedro Paterno; Member for Ilocos Norte (1857–1911)	September 15, 1898	November 13, 1899	Nonpartisan	Malolos Congress

=== Philippine Assembly (1907–1916) ===
The Philippine Assembly was created in 1907 under the Philippine Organic Act as the lower house of the bicameral Philippine Legislature. Sergio Osmeña was elected the first speaker of the Philippine Assembly.

No.	Portrait	Name (Birth–Death)	Term of office		Party	Legislature
No.	Portrait	Name (Birth–Death)	Took office	Left office	Party	Legislature
1		Sergio Osmeña; Member for Cebu–2nd (1878–1961)	October 16, 1907	October 16, 1916	Nacionalista	1st Legislature
1		Sergio Osmeña; Member for Cebu–2nd (1878–1961)	October 16, 1907	October 16, 1916	Nacionalista	2nd Legislature
1		Sergio Osmeña; Member for Cebu–2nd (1878–1961)	October 16, 1907	October 16, 1916	Nacionalista	3rd Legislature

=== House of Representatives (1916–1935) ===
In 1916, the Philippine Assembly was renamed the House of Representatives of the Philippines, becoming the lower chamber of the Philippine Congress.

No.	Portrait	Name (Birth–Death)	Term of office		Party	Legislature
No.	Portrait	Name (Birth–Death)	Took office	Left office	Party	Legislature
(1)		Sergio Osmeña; Member for Cebu–2nd (1878–1961)	October 16, 1916	June 6, 1922 (Note: Sergio Osmeña resigned on December 17, 1921, with the speakership's power being given to a steering committee of the House of Representatives.)	Nacionalista	4th Legislature
(1)		Sergio Osmeña; Member for Cebu–2nd (1878–1961)	October 16, 1916	June 6, 1922	Nacionalista	5th Legislature
2		Manuel Roxas; Member for Capiz–1st (1892–1948)	October 26, 1922	August 23, 1933	Nacionalista Colectivista (until 1925)	6th Legislature
2		Manuel Roxas; Member for Capiz–1st (1892–1948)	October 26, 1922	August 23, 1933	Nacionalista Consolidado (from 1925)	7th Legislature
2		Manuel Roxas; Member for Capiz–1st (1892–1948)	October 26, 1922	August 23, 1933	Nacionalista Consolidado (from 1925)	8th Legislature
2		Manuel Roxas; Member for Capiz–1st (1892–1948)	October 26, 1922	August 23, 1933	Nacionalista Consolidado (from 1925)	9th Legislature
3		Quintín Paredes; Member for Abra–Lone (1884–1973)	August 23, 1933	November 25, 1935	Nacionalista Consolidado (until 1934)	9th Legislature
3		Quintín Paredes; Member for Abra–Lone (1884–1973)	August 23, 1933	November 25, 1935	Nacionalista Democratico (from 1934)	10th Legislature

=== National Assembly (1935–1945) ===
The Constitutional Convention of 1934 provided for the creation of a unicameral National Assembly, abolishing the bicameral Congress. It served as the legislature during the Commonwealth period. During the Second Philippine Republic, a separate assembly was convened as established by the 1943 Constitution.

No.	Portrait	Name (Birth–Death)	Term of office		Party	Legislature
No.	Portrait	Name (Birth–Death)	Took office	Left office	Party	Legislature
4		Gil Montilla; Member for Negros Occidental–3rd (1876–1946)	November 25, 1935	December 30, 1938	Nacionalista Democratico	1st National Assembly
5		José Yulo; Member for Negros Occidental–3rd (1894–1976)	January 24, 1939	December 30, 1941	Nacionalista	2nd National Assembly
6		Benigno Aquino Sr. Member for Tarlac (1894–1947)	October 18, 1943	February 2, 1944	KALIBAPI	National Assembly (Second Republic)

=== House of Representatives (1945–1973) ===
Amendments to the 1935 Constitution in 1940 reestablished the House of Representatives.

No.	Portrait	Name (Birth–Death)	Term of office		Party	Legislature
No.	Portrait	Name (Birth–Death)	Took office	Left office	Party	Legislature
7		Jose Zulueta; Member for Iloilo–1st (1889–1972)	June 9, 1945	May 25, 1946	Nacionalista	1st Commonwealth Congress
8		Eugenio Pérez; Member for Pangasinan–2nd (1896–1957)	May 25, 1946	December 30, 1953	Liberal	2nd Commonwealth Congress
8		Eugenio Pérez; Member for Pangasinan–2nd (1896–1957)	May 25, 1946	December 30, 1953	Liberal	1st Congress
8		Eugenio Pérez; Member for Pangasinan–2nd (1896–1957)	May 25, 1946	December 30, 1953	Liberal	2nd Congress
9		Jose Laurel Jr. Member for Batangas–3rd (1912–1998)	January 25, 1954	December 30, 1957	Nacionalista	3rd Congress
10		Daniel Romualdez; Member for Leyte–4th (until 1961) and Leyte–1st (from 1961) (1907–1965)	January 27, 1958	March 8, 1962	Nacionalista	4th Congress
10		Daniel Romualdez; Member for Leyte–4th (until 1961) and Leyte–1st (from 1961) (1907–1965)	January 27, 1958	March 8, 1962	Nacionalista	5th Congress
11		Cornelio Villareal; Member for Capiz–2nd (1904–1992)	March 8, 1962	February 2, 1967	Liberal	5th Congress
11		Cornelio Villareal; Member for Capiz–2nd (1904–1992)	March 8, 1962	February 2, 1967	Liberal	6th Congress
12		Jose Laurel Jr. Member for Batangas–3rd (1912–1998)	February 2, 1967	April 1, 1971	Nacionalista	6th Congress
12		Jose Laurel Jr. Member for Batangas–3rd (1912–1998)	February 2, 1967	April 1, 1971	Nacionalista	7th Congress
13		Cornelio Villareal; Member for Capiz–2nd (1904–1992)	April 1, 1971	January 17, 1973	Liberal	7th Congress

=== Batasang Pambansa (1978–1986) ===
In 1972, President Ferdinand Marcos proclaimed martial law, effectively abolishing Congress. The unicameral Batasang Pambansa was established in 1976 under the 1973 Constitution. It was first convened as an interim assembly in 1978 and as a regular assembly in 1984.

No.	Portrait	Name (Birth–Death)	Term of office		Party	Legislature
No.	Portrait	Name (Birth–Death)	Took office	Left office	Party	Legislature
14		Querube Makalintal; Member for Region IV (1910–2002)	July 31, 1978	June 30, 1984	KBL	Interim Batasang Pambansa
15		Nicanor Yñiguez; Member for Southern Leyte (1915–2007)	July 23, 1984	March 25, 1986	KBL	Regular Batasang Pambansa

=== House of Representatives (1987–present) ===
With the ratification of the 1987 Constitution, the House of Representatives was reestablished.

No.	Portrait	Name (Birth–Death)	Term of office		Party	Legislature
No.	Portrait	Name (Birth–Death)	Took office	Left office	Party	Legislature
16		Ramon Mitra Jr. Member for Palawan–2nd (1928–2000)	July 27, 1987	June 30, 1992	LnB (until 1988)	8th Congress
16		Ramon Mitra Jr. Member for Palawan–2nd (1928–2000)	July 27, 1987	June 30, 1992	LDP (from 1988)	8th Congress
17		Jose de Venecia Jr. Member for Pangasinan–4th (1936–2026)	July 27, 1992	June 30, 1998	Lakas	9th Congress
17		Jose de Venecia Jr. Member for Pangasinan–4th (1936–2026)	July 27, 1992	June 30, 1998	Lakas	10th Congress
18		Manny Villar; Member for Las Piñas–Lone (born 1949)	July 27, 1998	November 13, 2000	LAMMP (until 2000)	11th Congress
18		Manny Villar; Member for Las Piñas–Lone (born 1949)	July 27, 1998	November 13, 2000	Independent (from 2000)	11th Congress
19		Arnulfo Fuentebella; Member for Camarines Sur–3rd (1945–2020)	November 13, 2000	January 24, 2001	NPC	11th Congress
20		Feliciano Belmonte Jr. Member for Quezon City–4th (born 1936)	January 24, 2001	June 30, 2001	Lakas	11th Congress
21		Jose de Venecia Jr. Member for Pangasinan–4th (1936–2026)	July 23, 2001	February 5, 2008	Lakas	12th Congress
21		Jose de Venecia Jr. Member for Pangasinan–4th (1936–2026)	July 23, 2001	February 5, 2008	Lakas	13th Congress
21		Jose de Venecia Jr. Member for Pangasinan–4th (1936–2026)	July 23, 2001	February 5, 2008	Lakas	14th Congress
22		Prospero Nograles; Member for Davao City–1st (1947–2019)	February 5, 2008	June 30, 2010	Lakas	14th Congress
23		Feliciano Belmonte Jr. Member for Quezon City–4th (born 1936)	July 26, 2010	June 30, 2016	Liberal	15th Congress
23		Feliciano Belmonte Jr. Member for Quezon City–4th (born 1936)	July 26, 2010	June 30, 2016	Liberal	16th Congress
24		Pantaleon Alvarez; Member for Davao del Norte–1st (born 1958)	July 25, 2016	July 23, 2018	PDP–Laban	17th Congress
25		Gloria Macapagal Arroyo; Member for Pampanga–2nd (born 1947)	July 23, 2018	June 30, 2019	PDP–Laban	17th Congress
26		Alan Peter Cayetano; Member for Taguig–Pateros–1st (born 1970)	July 22, 2019	October 12, 2020	Nacionalista	18th Congress
27		Lord Allan Velasco; Member for Marinduque–Lone (born 1977)	October 12, 2020	June 30, 2022	PDP–Laban	18th Congress
28		Martin Romualdez; Member for Leyte–1st (born 1963)	July 25, 2022	September 17, 2025	Lakas	19th Congress
28		Martin Romualdez; Member for Leyte–1st (born 1963)	July 25, 2022	September 17, 2025	Lakas	20th Congress
29		Bojie Dy; Member for Isabela–6th (born 1961)	September 17, 2025	Incumbent	PFP	20th Congress

== Speakers per region ==
Region	Total
National Capital Region	4
Eastern Visayas	3
Western Visayas	3
Central Luzon	2
Davao	2
Ilocos	2
Mimaropa	2
Negros Island	2
Bicol	1
Cagayan Valley	1
Calabarzon	1
Central Visayas	1
Cordillera	1

== Speakers by time in office ==
Rank	Name	Time in office	TE	Year(s) in which elected
1	Sergio Osmeña	14 years, 233 days	6	1907; 1908; 1910; 1912; 1916; 1919
2	Jose de Venecia Jr.	12 years, 170 days	5	1992; 1995; 2001; 2004; 2007
3	Manuel Roxas	10 years, 300 days	4	1922; 1925; 1928; 1931
4	Jose Laurel Jr.	8 years, 32 days	3	1954; 1967; 1970
5	Eugenio Pérez	7 years, 219 days	2	1946; 1949
6	Cornelio Villareal	6 years, 257 days	3	1962; 1966; 1971
7	Feliciano Belmonte Jr.	6 years, 132 days	3	2001; 2010; 2013
8	Querube Makalintal	5 years, 335 days	1	1978
9	Ramon Mitra Jr.	4 years, 339 days	1	1987
10	Daniel Romualdez	4 years, 40 days	2	1958; 1962
11	Martin Romualdez	3 years, 54 days	2	2022; 2025
12	Gil Montilla	3 years, 35 days	1	1935
13	José Yulo	2 years, 340 days	1	1939
14	Prospero Nograles	2 years, 145 days	1	2008
15	Manny Villar	2 years, 109 days	1	1998
16	Quintín Paredes	2 years, 94 days	2	1933; 1934
17	Pantaleon Alvarez	1 year, 363 days	1	2016
18	Lord Allan Velasco	1 year, 261 days	1	2020
19	Nicanor Yñiguez	1 year, 245 days	1	1984
20	Alan Peter Cayetano	1 year, 82 days	1	2019
21	Bojie Dy	1 year, 58 days	1	2025
22	Jose Zulueta	350 days	1	1945
23	Gloria Macapagal Arroyo	342 days	1	2018
24	Benigno Aquino Sr.	107 days	1	1943
25	Arnulfo Fuentebella	72 days	1	2000

== See also ==
- List of Speaker of the Philippine House of Representatives elections
- Floor leaders of the House of Representatives of the Philippines
- List of current presidents of legislatures
