= List of Speaker of the Philippine House of Representatives elections =

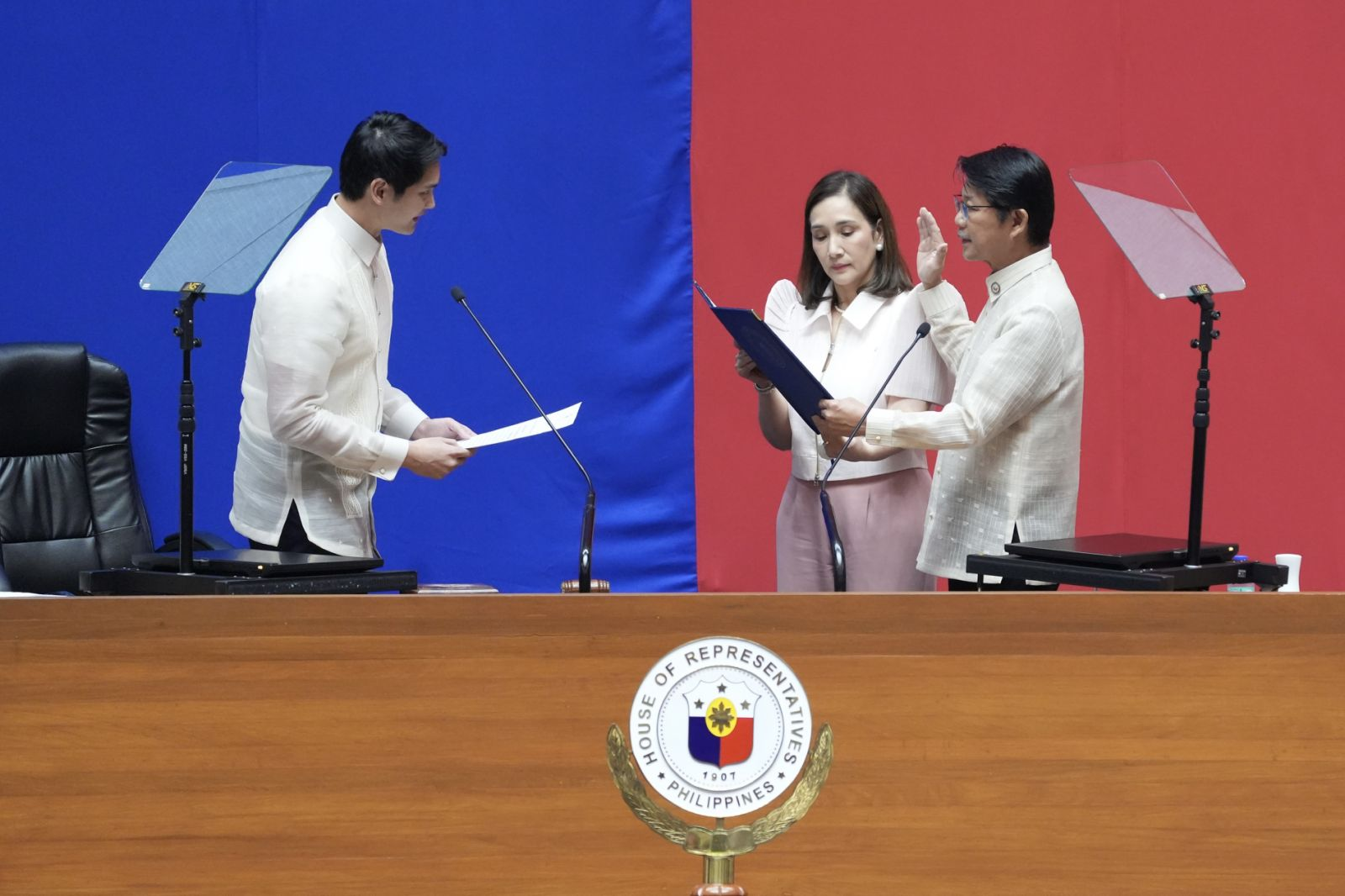
Bojie Dy (right) is sworn in by Javi Benitez (left) as the new speaker of the House on September 17, 2025.

An election for the speaker of the House of Representatives of the Philippines is regularly held after a general election upon the opening of a new Congress, or when the incumbent speaker dies, resigns, or is ousted from the position through a motion to vacate, or when a majority of representatives sign a resolution supporting another member for the speakership. The speaker is the body's presiding officer and highest-ranking official, serving as the administrative head of the House.

Elections for a new House speaker are generally held at least every three years, and have been held at least 48 times (originating from the election of the president of the Malolos Congress, followed by elections for the lower house of the national legislature, and later, for the unicameral Batasang Pambansa). By tradition, the majority party in the House decides from among its members whom to nominate for the speakership. Most elections since 1987 have seen coalitions of major parties supporting a single nominee for the position, with a contender also chosen by the opposition. An election is generally conducted by nominal voting, with the secretary calling the roll of members to cast their votes. If there is only one nominee for the position, upon the closing of nominations and with no objection heard from the floor, the candidate is elected speaker by acclamation. The representative who receives a majority of all votes cast is declared the new speaker. Historically, only the 1898 election for the president of the Malolos Congress and the 1922 election for House speaker required multiple ballots to determine a winner. All succeeding elections required only one round of voting, but if no candidate receives a majority, it is presumed that the roll call is repeated until a speaker is elected.

Representatives are not restricted to voting for a candidate from their own party, although in recent Congresses lawmakers have tended to vote for their partymates or the nominee belonging to party of the sitting president.

Since 1907, 25 representatives have served as speaker; ten served multiple terms, while 15 were elected only once. Sergio Osmeña, who served as the first House speaker from 1916 to 1935, holds the record for the most electoral victories for the speakership, having been elected six times. He is also the youngest speaker to serve at 29.

- Malolos Congress (1898–1899)
- 1898
- Philippine Assembly (1907–1916)
- 1907
- 1908
- 1910
- 1912
- House of Representatives (1916–1935)
- 1916
- 1919
- 1922
- 1925
- 1928
- 1931
- 1933
- 1934
- National Assembly (1935–1944)
- 1935
- 1939
- 1943
- House of Representatives (1945–1973)
- 1945
- 1946
- 1949
- 1954
- 1958
- January 1962
- March 1962
- 1966
- 1967
- 1970
- 1971
- Batasang Pambansa (1978–1986)
- 1978
- 1984
- House of Representatives (since 1987)
- 1987
- 1992
- 1995
- 1998
- 2000
- January 2001
- July 2001
- 2004
- 2007
- 2008
- 2010
- 2013
- 2016
- 2018
- 2019
- 2020
- 2022
- July 2025
- September 2025

== Malolos Congress (1898–1899) ==
=== September 1898 ===
The election for the president of the Malolos Congress took place on September 15, 1898. Pedro Paterno, a delegate from Ilocos Norte, was elected president of the Congress on the second ballot after failing to obtain an absolute majority in the first vote.

1898 election for president of the Congress
September 15, 1898 – 1st ballot
Party	Candidate	Votes	%
Nonpartisan	Pedro Paterno (Ilocos Norte)	24	(Note: As the specific number of votes in the election is not known, a candidate vote percentage is indeterminable.)
Nonpartisan	Antonio Luna (Ilocos Norte)	23	(Note: As the specific number of votes in the election is not known, a candidate vote percentage is indeterminable.)
Nonpartisan	Hugo Ilagan (Cavite)	5	(Note: As the specific number of votes in the election is not known, a candidate vote percentage is indeterminable.)
—	Others	(?)	(Note: As the specific number of votes in the election is not known, a candidate vote percentage is indeterminable.)
Total votes		52+	100.00
September 15, 1898 – 2nd ballot
Party	Candidate	Votes	%
Nonpartisan	Pedro Paterno (Ilocos Norte)	31	55.36
Nonpartisan	Antonio Luna (Ilocos Norte)	25	44.64
Total votes		56	100.00

== Philippine Assembly (1907–1916) ==
=== October 1907 ===
An election for speaker of the Philippine Assembly took place on October 16, 1907, at the start of the 1st Legislature, following the 1907 elections in which members of the Nacionalista Party won a majority of the seats. Sergio Osmeña was elected speaker by acclamation.

1907 election for speaker
Party	Candidate	Votes	%
Nacionalista	Sergio Osmeña (Cebu–2nd)	80	100.00
Total votes		80	100.00

=== February 1908 ===
An election for speaker took place on February 8, 1908, during the second regular session of the 1st Legislature. Sergio Osmeña was re-elected speaker.

1908 election for speaker
Party	Candidate	Votes	%
Nacionalista	Sergio Osmeña (Cebu–2nd) (incumbent)	Majority	
Total votes		(?)	100.00

=== October 1910 ===
An election for speaker took place on October 17, 1910, at the start of the 2nd Legislature, following the 1909 elections in which members of the Nacionalista Party won a majority of the seats. Sergio Osmeña was re-elected speaker.

1910 election for speaker
Party	Candidate	Votes	%
Nacionalista	Sergio Osmeña (Cebu–2nd) (incumbent)	Majority	
Total votes		(?)	100.00

=== October 1912 ===
An election for speaker took place on October 16, 1912, at the start of the 3rd Legislature, following the 1912 elections in which members of the Nacionalista Party won a majority of the seats. Sergio Osmeña was re-elected speaker.

1912 election for speaker
Party	Candidate	Votes	%
Nacionalista	Sergio Osmeña (Cebu–2nd) (incumbent)	Majority	
Total votes		(?)	100.00

== House of Representatives (1916–1935) ==
=== October 1916 ===
An election for speaker of the Philippine House of Representatives took place on October 16, 1916, at the start of the 4th Legislature, following the 1916 elections in which members of the Nacionalista Party won a majority of the seats. Sergio Osmeña was re-elected speaker.

1916 election for speaker
Party	Candidate	Votes	%
Nacionalista	Sergio Osmeña (Cebu–2nd) (incumbent)	Majority	
Total votes		(?)	100.00

=== July 1919 ===
An election for speaker took place on July 21, 1919, at the start of the 5th Legislature, following the 1919 elections in which members of the Nacionalista Party won a majority of the seats. Sergio Osmeña was re-elected speaker.

1919 election for speaker
Party	Candidate	Votes	%
Nacionalista	Sergio Osmeña (Cebu–2nd) (incumbent)	Majority	
Total votes		(?)	100.00

=== October 1922 ===
An election for speaker took place on October 16, 1922, at the start of the 6th Legislature, following the 1922 elections in which members of the Colectivista faction of the Nacionalista Party won a majority of the seats. Manuel Roxas received a majority of the votes cast in the 13th ballot and was elected speaker.

1922 election for speaker
October 16, 1922 – 1st ballot
Party	Candidate	Votes	%
Nacionalista Colectivista	Manuel Roxas (Capiz–1st)	33	35.48
Democrata	Claro M. Recto (Batangas–3rd)	25	26.88
Nacionalista Unipersonalista	Mariano Cuenco (Cebu–5th)	5	5.38
Independent	Anselmo Bernad (Misamis–2nd)	3	3.23
Nacionalista Unipersonalista	Benigno Aquino Sr. (Tarlac–2nd)	1	1.08
Nacionalista Colectivista	Antonio de las Alas (Batangas–1st)	1	1.08
Democrata	Mariano Melendres (Rizal–2nd)	1	1.08
Total votes		93	100.00
October 26, 1922 – 13th ballot
Party	Candidate	Votes	%
Nacionalista Colectivista	Manuel Roxas (Capiz–1st)	49	52.69
Independent	Anselmo Bernad (Misamis–2nd)	3	3.23
Nacionalista Colectivista	Antonio de las Alas (Batangas–1st)	1	1.08
Total votes		93	100.00

=== July 1925 ===
An election for speaker took place on July 16, 1925, at the start of the 7th Legislature, following the 1925 elections in which members of the Nacionalista Consolidado Party won a majority of the seats. Manuel Roxas was re-elected speaker.

1925 election for speaker
Party	Candidate	Votes	%
Nacionalista Consolidado	Manuel Roxas (Capiz–1st) (incumbent)	Majority	
Total votes		(?)	100.00

=== July 1928 ===
An election for speaker took place on July 16, 1928, at the start of the 8th Legislature, following the 1928 elections in which members of the Nacionalista Consolidado Party won a majority of the seats. Manuel Roxas was re-elected speaker.

1928 election for speaker
Party	Candidate	Votes	%
Nacionalista Consolidado	Manuel Roxas (Capiz–1st) (incumbent)	Majority	
Total votes		(?)	100.00

=== July 1931 ===
An election for speaker took place on July 16, 1931, at the start of the 9th Legislature, following the 1931 elections in which members of the Nacionalista Consolidado Party won a majority of the seats. Manuel Roxas was re-elected speaker.

1931 election for speaker
Party	Candidate	Votes	%
Nacionalista Consolidado	Manuel Roxas (Capiz–1st) (incumbent)	Majority	
Total votes		(?)	100.00

=== July 1933 ===
On July 24, 1933, Manuel Roxas was ousted from the speakership. Consequently, an intra-term election for a new speaker was held on the same day, during the 9th Legislature. Quintín Paredes was elected speaker.

1933 election for speaker
Party	Candidate	Votes	%
Nacionalista Consolidado	Quintín Paredes (Abra at-large)	54	60.67
Abstention		35	39.33
Total votes		89	100.00

=== July 1934 ===
An election for speaker took place on July 16, 1934, at the start of the 10th Legislature, following the 1934 elections in which members of the Democratico faction of the Nacionalista Party won a majority of the seats. Quintín Paredes was re-elected speaker.

1934 election for speaker
Party	Candidate	Votes	%
Nacionalista Democratico	Quintín Paredes (Abra at-large) (incumbent)	63	75.90
Nacionalista Democrata Pro-Independencia	Manuel Roxas (Capiz–1st)	19	22.89
Nacionalista Democrata Pro-Independencia	Nicolas Rafols (Cebu–6th)	1	0.01
Total votes		83	100.00

== National Assembly (1935–1944) ==
=== November 1935 ===
An election for speaker of the National Assembly of the Philippine Commonwealth took place on November 25, 1935, at the start of the 1st National Assembly, following the 1935 elections in which members of the Democratico faction of the Nacionalista Party won a majority of the seats. Gil Montilla was formally elected speaker, after having been unanimously chosen in a party caucus on November 23.

1935 election for speaker
Party	Candidate	Votes	%
Nacionalista Democratico	Gil Montilla (Negros Occidental–3rd)	Unanimous	
Total votes		(?)	100.00

=== January 1939 ===
An election for speaker took place on January 12, 1939, during the party caucus of the Nacionalista Party before the first session of the 2nd National Assembly on January 24. It followed the 1938 elections in which members of the Nacionalista Party won all of the seats. José Yulo was elected speaker.

1939 election for speaker
Party	Candidate	Votes	%
Nacionalista	José Yulo (Negros Occidental–3rd)	Unanimous	
Total votes		(?)	100.00

=== October 1943 ===
An election for speaker of the National Assembly of the Second Republic took place on October 18, 1943, following the 1943 elections in which members of the KALIBAPI won all of the seats. Benigno Aquino Sr. was elected speaker by acclamation.

1943 election for speaker
Party	Candidate	Votes	%
KALIBAPI	Benigno Aquino Sr. (Tarlac at-large)	107	100.00
Total votes		107	100.00

== House of Representatives (1945–1973) ==
=== June 1945 ===
An election for speaker of the reestablished Philippine House of Representatives took place on June 9, 1945, when the 1st Commonwealth Congress finally convened after the end of World War II which had prevented representatives elected in 1941 from taking office, following the 1941 elections in which members of the Nacionalista Party won a majority of the seats. Jose Zulueta was elected speaker.

1945 election for speaker
Party	Candidate	Votes	%
Nacionalista	Jose Zulueta (Iloilo–1st)	Majority	
Total votes		(?)	100.00

=== May 1946 ===
An election for speaker took place on May 25, 1946, at the start of the 1st Congress (originally convened as the 2nd Commonwealth Congress), one month after the 1946 elections in which members of the Liberal Party won a majority of the seats. Eugenio Pérez was elected speaker.

1946 election for speaker
Party	Candidate	Votes	%
Liberal	Eugenio Pérez (Pangasinan–2nd) (incumbent)	Majority	
Total votes		(?)	100.00

=== December 1949 ===
An election for speaker took place on December 30, 1949, at the start of the 2nd Congress, one month after the 1949 elections in which members of the Liberal Party won a majority of the seats. Eugenio Pérez was re-elected speaker.

1949 election for speaker
Party	Candidate	Votes	%
Liberal	Eugenio Pérez (Pangasinan–2nd) (incumbent)	Majority	
Total votes		(?)	100.00

=== January 1954 ===
An election for speaker took place on January 25, 1954, at the start of the 3rd Congress, two months after the 1953 elections in which members of the Nacionalista Party won a majority of the seats. Jose Laurel Jr. was elected speaker.

1954 election for speaker
Party	Candidate	Votes	%
Nacionalista	Jose Laurel Jr. (Batangas–3rd)	Majority	
Total votes		(?)	100.00

=== January 1958 ===
An election for speaker took place on January 27, 1958, at the start of the 4th Congress, two months after the 1957 elections in which members of the Nacionalista Party won a majority of the seats. Daniel Romualdez was elected speaker.

1958 election for speaker
Party	Candidate	Votes	%
Nacionalista	Daniel Romualdez (Leyte–4th)	Majority	
Total votes		(?)	100.00

=== January 1962 ===
An election for speaker took place on January 22, 1962, at the start of the 5th Congress, two months after the 1961 elections in which members of the Nacionalista Party won a majority of the seats. Daniel Romualdez was re-elected speaker.

January 1962 election for speaker
Party	Candidate	Votes	%
Nacionalista	Daniel Romualdez (Leyte–1st) (incumbent)	Majority	
Total votes		(?)	100.00

=== March 1962 ===
On March 9, 1962, Daniel Romualdez was ousted from the speakership. Consequently, an intra-term election for a new speaker was held on the same day, during the 5th Congress. Cornelio Villareal was elected speaker.

March 1962 election for speaker
Party	Candidate	Votes	%
Liberal	Cornelio Villareal (Capiz–2nd)	Majority	
Total votes		(?)	100.00

=== January 1966 ===
An election for speaker took place on January 17, 1966, at the start of the 6th Congress, two months after the 1965 elections in which members of the Liberal Party won a majority of the seats. Cornelio Villareal was re-elected speaker.

1966 election for speaker
Party	Candidate	Votes	%
Liberal	Cornelio Villareal (Capiz–2nd) (incumbent)	Majority	
Total votes		(?)	100.00

=== February 1967 ===
On February 2, 1967, Cornelio Villareal was ousted from the speakership. Consequently, an intra-term election for a new speaker was held on the same day, during the 6th Congress. Jose Laurel Jr. was elected speaker.

1967 election for speaker
Party	Candidate	Votes	%
Nacionalista	Jose Laurel Jr. (Batangas–3rd)	Majority	
Total votes		(?)	100.00

=== January 1970 ===
An election for speaker took place on January 26, 1970, at the start of the 7th Congress, two months after the 1969 elections in which members of the Nacionalista Party won a majority of the seats. Jose Laurel Jr. was re-elected speaker.

1970 election for speaker
Party	Candidate	Votes	%
Nacionalista	Jose Laurel Jr. (Batangas–3rd) (incumbent)	Majority	
Total votes		(?)	100.00

=== April 1971 ===
On April 1, 1971, Jose Laurel Jr. was ousted from the speakership. Consequently, an intra-term election for a new speaker was held on the same day, during the 7th Congress. Cornelio Villareal was elected speaker.

1971 election for speaker
Party	Candidate	Votes	%
Liberal	Cornelio Villareal (Capiz–2nd)	Majority	
Total votes		(?)	100.00

== Batasang Pambansa (1978–1986) ==
=== July 1978 ===
An election for speaker of the Interim Batasang Pambansa took place on July 31, 1978, three months after the 1978 elections in which members of the Kilusang Bagong Lipunan won a majority of the seats. Querube Makalintal was elected speaker by acclamation.

1978 election for speaker
Party	Candidate	Votes	%
KBL	Querube Makalintal (Region IV)	Unanimous	
Total votes		(?)	100.00

=== July 1984 ===
An election for speaker of the Regular Batasang Pambansa took place on July 23, 1984, two months after the 1984 elections in which members of the Kilusang Bagong Lipunan won a majority of the seats. Nicanor Yñiguez received a majority of the votes cast and was elected speaker.

1984 election for speaker
Party	Candidate	Votes	%
KBL	Nicanor Yñiguez (Southern Leyte at-large)	111	63.43
UNIDO	Jose Laurel Jr. (Batangas at-large)	56	32.00
Nacionalista	Rafael Palmares (Iloilo at-large)	8	4.57
Total votes		175	100.00

== House of Representatives (since 1987) ==
=== July 1987 ===
An election for speaker of the reestablished Philippine House of Representatives took place on July 27, 1987, at the start of the 8th Congress, two months after the 1987 elections. Ramon Mitra Jr. received a majority of the votes cast and was elected speaker.

1987 election for speaker
Party	Candidate	Votes	%
Lakas ng Bansa	Ramon Mitra Jr. (Palawan at-large)	167	91.26
KBL	Rodolfo Albano Jr. (Isabela–1st)	16	8.74
Total votes		183	100.00

=== July 1992 ===
An election for speaker took place on July 27, 1992, at the start of the 9th Congress, two months after the 1992 elections. Jose de Venecia Jr. received a majority of the votes cast and was elected speaker.

1992 election for speaker
Party	Candidate	Votes	%
Lakas–NUCD	Jose de Venecia Jr. (Pangasinan–4th)	151	78.24
LDP	Peping Cojuangco (Tarlac–1st)	42	21.76
Total votes		193	100.00

=== July 1995 ===
An election for speaker took place on July 24, 1995, at the start of the 10th Congress, two months after the 1995 elections. Jose de Venecia Jr. received a majority of the votes cast and was re-elected speaker.

1995 election for speaker
Party	Candidate	Votes	%
Lakas–NUCD–UMDP	Jose de Venecia Jr. (Pangasinan–4th) (incumbent)	159	86.41
NPC	Ronaldo Zamora (San Juan at-large)	25	13.59
Total votes		184	100.00

=== July 1998 ===
An election for speaker took place on July 27, 1998, at the start of the 11th Congress, two months after the 1998 elections. Manny Villar received a majority of the votes cast and was elected speaker.

1998 election for speaker
Party	Candidate	Votes	%
LAMMP	Manny Villar (Las Piñas at-large)	171	77.38
Lakas–NUCD–UMDP	Feliciano Belmonte Jr. (Quezon City–4th)	39	17.65
LAMMP	Joker Arroyo (Makati–1st)	11	4.98
Total votes		219	100.00

=== November 2000 ===
On November 13, 2000, Manny Villar was removed from the speakership through a motion to vacate. Consequently, an intra-term election for a new speaker was held on the same day, during the 11th Congress. Arnulfo Fuentebella was elected speaker.

2000 election for speaker
Party	Candidate	Votes	%
NPC	Arnulfo Fuentebella (Camarines Sur–3rd)	114	54.55
Independent	Manny Villar (Las Piñas at-large) (incumbent)	93	44.50
Abstention		2	0.96
Total votes		209	100.00

=== January 2001 ===
On January 24, 2001, Arnulfo Fuentebella was removed from the speakership through a motion to vacate. Consequently, an intra-term election for a new speaker was held on the same day, during the 11th Congress. Feliciano Belmonte Jr. was elected speaker.

January 2001 election for speaker
Party	Candidate	Votes	%
Lakas–NUCD–UMDP	Feliciano Belmonte Jr. (Quezon City–4th)	112	57.73
LDP	Butz Aquino (Makati–2nd)	79	40.72
Abstention		3	1.55
Total votes		194	100.00

=== July 2001 ===
An election for speaker took place on July 26, 2001, at the start of the 12th Congress, two months after the 2001 elections. Jose de Venecia Jr. received a majority of the votes cast and was elected speaker.

July 2001 election for speaker
Party	Candidate	Votes	%
Lakas–NUCD–UMDP	Jose de Venecia Jr. (Pangasinan–4th)	186	91.18
LDP	Jacinto Paras (Negros Oriental–1st)	17	8.33
Abstention		1	0.49
Total votes		204	100.00

=== July 2004 ===
An election for speaker took place on July 26, 2004, at the start of the 13th Congress, two months after the 2004 elections. Jose de Venecia Jr. received a majority of the votes cast and was re-elected speaker.

2004 election for speaker
Party	Candidate	Votes	%
Lakas–NUCD–UMDP	Jose de Venecia Jr. (Pangasinan–4th) (incumbent)	193	85.02
NPC	Francis Escudero (Sorsogon–1st)	13	5.73
LDP	Jacinto Paras (Negros Oriental–1st)	8	3.52
PMP	Ronaldo Zamora (San Juan at-large)	7	3.08
Abstention		6	2.64
Total votes		227	100.00

=== July 2007 ===
An election for speaker took place on July 23, 2007, at the start of the 14th Congress, two months after the 2007 elections. Jose de Venecia Jr. received a majority of the votes cast and was re-elected speaker.

2007 election for speaker
Party	Candidate	Votes	%
Lakas–NUCD–UMDP	Jose de Venecia Jr. (Pangasinan–4th) (incumbent)	186	88.15
Abstention		24	11.37
Against		1	0.47
Total votes		211	100.00

=== February 2008 ===
On February 5, 2008, Jose de Venecia Jr. was removed from the speakership through a motion to vacate. Consequently, an intra-term election for a new speaker was held on the same day, during the 14th Congress. Prospero Nograles was elected speaker by acclamation.

2008 election for speaker
Party	Candidate	Votes	%
Lakas–NUCD–UMDP	Prospero Nograles (Davao City–1st)	231	100.00
Total votes		231	100.00

=== July 2010 ===
An election for speaker took place on July 26, 2010, at the start of the 15th Congress, two months after the 2010 elections. Feliciano Belmonte Jr. received a majority of the votes cast and was elected speaker.

2010 election for speaker
Party	Candidate	Votes	%
Liberal	Feliciano Belmonte Jr. (Quezon City–4th)	227	88.67
Lakas–Kampi–CMD	Edcel Lagman (Albay–1st)	29	11.33
Total votes		256	100.00

=== July 2013 ===
An election for speaker took place on July 22, 2013, at the start of the 16th Congress, two months after the 2013 elections. Feliciano Belmonte Jr. received a majority of the votes cast and was re-elected speaker.

2013 election for speaker
Party	Candidate	Votes	%
Liberal	Feliciano Belmonte Jr. (Quezon City–4th) (incumbent)	244	86.83
UNA	Ronaldo Zamora (San Juan at-large)	19	6.76
Lakas–CMD	Martin Romualdez (Leyte–1st)	16	5.69
Abstention		2	0.71
Total votes		281	100.00

=== July 2016 ===
An election for speaker took place on July 25, 2016, at the start of the 17th Congress, two months after the 2016 elections. Pantaleon Alvarez received a majority of the votes cast and was elected speaker.

2016 election for speaker
Party	Candidate	Votes	%
PDP–Laban	Pantaleon Alvarez (Davao del Norte–1st)	252	87.20
Abstention		21	7.27
Liberal	Teddy Baguilat (Ifugao at-large)	8	2.77
Lakas–CMD	Danilo Suarez (Quezon–1st)	7	2.42
Against		1	0.35
Total votes		289	100.00

=== July 2018 ===
The start of the 2018 State of the Nation Address of President Rodrigo Duterte on July 23, 2018 was delayed by almost half an hour, after the House of Representatives informally convened to hold an intra-term election for a new speaker. Gloria Macapagal Arroyo received a majority of the votes cast and was elected speaker. Incumbent speaker Pantaleon Alvarez disputed the appointment and his allies blocked the declaration of the position as vacant. The House convened in a formal session in the evening after the presidential speech to conduct another vote. The session which included Arroyo's formal election was recorded in House Resolution No. 2025.

2018 election for speaker
Party	Candidate	Votes	%
PDP–Laban	Gloria Macapagal Arroyo (Pampanga–2nd)	184	92.46
Abstention		12	6.03
Against		3	1.51
Total votes		199	100.00

=== July 2019 ===
An election for speaker took place on July 22, 2019, at the start of the 18th Congress, two months after the 2019 elections. Alan Peter Cayetano received a majority of the votes cast and was elected speaker.

2019 election for speaker
Party	Candidate	Votes	%
Nacionalista	Alan Peter Cayetano (Taguig–Pateros–1st)	266	89.56
NUP	Benny Abante (Manila–6th)	28	9.43
Abstention		2	0.67
Against		1	0.34
Total votes		297	100.00

=== October 2020 ===
On October 12, 2020, a total of 186 members of the House of Representatives gathered at the Celebrity Sports Complex in Quezon City to hold an intra-term election for a new speaker during the 18th Congress, ousting Alan Peter Cayetano. Lord Allan Velasco received a majority of the votes cast and was elected speaker. This was initially disputed by Cayetano until October 13, 2020, when the same number of representatives first approved a motion to vacate the chair, then elected Velasco as speaker during a special session at the Batasang Pambansa.

2020 election for speaker
Party	Candidate	Votes	%
PDP–Laban	Lord Allan Velasco (Marinduque at-large)	186	100.00
Total votes		186	100.00

=== July 2022 ===
An election for speaker took place on July 25, 2022, at the start of the 19th Congress, two months after the 2022 elections. Martin Romualdez received a majority of the votes cast and was elected speaker.

2022 election for speaker
Party	Candidate	Votes	%
Lakas–CMD	Martin Romualdez (Leyte–1st)	283	98.26
Abstention		4	1.39
Against		1	0.35
Total votes		303	100.00

=== July 2025 ===
An election for speaker took place on July 28, 2025, at the start of the 20th Congress, two months after the 2025 elections. Martin Romualdez received a majority of the votes cast and was re-elected speaker.

July 2025 election for speaker
Party	Candidate	Votes	%
Lakas–CMD	Martin Romualdez (Leyte–1st) (incumbent)	269	88.78
Abstention		34	11.22
Total votes		303	100.00

=== September 2025 ===
On September 17, 2025, Martin Romualdez resigned from the speakership after being implicated in the controversy involving anomalous flood control projects. Consequently, an intra-term election for a new speaker was held on the same day, during the 20th Congress. Bojie Dy received a majority of the votes cast and was elected speaker.

September 2025 election for speaker
Party	Candidate	Votes	%
PFP	Bojie Dy (Isabela–6th)	253	90.04
Abstention		28	9.96
Total votes		281	100.00

== See also ==
- List of President of the Senate of the Philippines elections
