= PDP–Lakas Coalition =

Filipino political alliance for 1988 local elections

- Leader: Corazon Aquino; Ramon Mitra Jr.
- Founded: 1988; 38 years ago
- Dissolved: September 16, 1988; 38 years ago
- Succeeded by: Laban ng Demokratikong Pilipino
- Ideology: Big tent
- Political position: Centre
- Coalition members: PDP–Laban; Lakas ng Bansa
- Colors: Blue (customary), and White

The PDP–Lakas Coalition also known as PDP–Lakas was a defunct multi-party electoral alliance supported by President Corazon Aquino and her administration for the 1988 Philippine local elections. It was a coalition of then two major parties in the Philippines, the PDP–Laban of President Aquino, and the Lakas ng Bansa of House Speaker Ramon Mitra Jr.

The coalition featured local candidates from both PDP–Laban and the Lakas ng Bansa parties in various provinces, cities and towns for the January 18, 1988 local election. The coalition won 5,093 seats (31.94%) out of the 15,946 total local posts up for this election.

== History ==
In preparation for the upcoming local election, scheduled to held on January 18, 1988. House Speaker Ramon Mitra Jr. of Palawan meet with PDP–Laban officials to form a coalition for the local election and to strengthen the administration of President Corazon Aquino in the local politics.

== Election results ==
=== Local elections ===
Local Government of the Philippines
Year	Seats won	Result	President
1988 (Note: Combined results of PDP–Laban and Lakas ng Bansa)	5,093 / 15,946	PDP–Lakas plurality	Corazon Aquino

== Aftermath ==
In late 1988, Speaker Mitra, Congressman Peping Cojuangco, and presidential in-law Paul Aquino agreed to merge Lakas ng Bansa and the PDP–Laban (Cojuangco faction) to form the Laban ng Demokratikong Pilipino (LDP). The Cojuangco faction was formed in 1988 due to Cojuangco's recruitment of former Pro-Marcoses and Kilusang Bagong Lipunan (KBL) politicians to be members of the administration PDP–Laban. On September 16, 1988 the Laban ng Demokratikong Pilipino was officially established headed by Mitra and Cojuangco and until this day still stand as a political party, respectively.

== See also ==
- Laban ng Demokratikong Pilipino, PDP–Lakas successor.
