= September 2025 Speaker of the Philippine House of Representatives election =

47th speakership election in the Philippine House of Representatives

- September 17, 2025
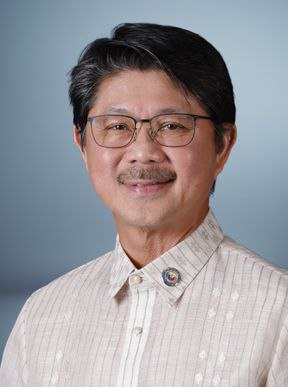
Candidate	Bojie Dy
Party	PFP
House vote	253
Percentage	90.04%
Constituency	Isabela–6th
House Speaker before election
Martin Romualdez
Lakas
Elected House Speaker
Bojie Dy
PFP

An election for the speaker of the House of Representatives of the Philippines was suddenly held on September 17, 2025. It was the second leadership election of the House of Representatives in the 20th Congress and was the 47th election for the speakership in the chamber's history.

This election followed the resignation of incumbent House speaker Martin Romualdez, after being implicated in the controversy on anomalous flood control projects. This was the first leadership election in the House since July 26, 2001 that happened in the same year when a previous leadership election also took place.

== Background ==
On July 28, 2025, President Bongbong Marcos delivered his fourth State of the Nation Address, which centered on the government's accomplishments despite various issues surrounding the administration, particularly government-funded anomalous flood control projects, which gave rise to allegations of corruption and bribery involving several lawmakers, government officials, and associated contractors. House speaker Martin Romualdez, who had drawn criticism for his involvement in the approval of the 2025 national budget, tagged as one of the "most corrupt" general appropriations measures in Philippine history, was implicated by contractor Curlee Discaya during a Senate Blue Ribbon Committee probe into public works contracts. Discaya alleged that Romualdez approved the budget through unprogrammed funds and insertions, citing statements by former Quezon City Representative Marvin Rillo and incumbent Uswag Ilonggo party-list Representative Jojo Ang. Romualdez denied the allegations, but amid growing pressure from various sectors, ultimately resigned as speaker on September 17, 2025. A day earlier, Deputy Speaker Ronaldo Puno reported that Romualdez had considered taking a leave of absence instead, but stated that before going to Malacañang Palace to discuss with the president, Romualdez chose to resign completely.

== Electoral system ==
When the office of speaker is vacant (usually at the beginning of a new Congress), the secretary-general of the House sits as the presiding officer until a person is elected. A speaker is usually elected via majority vote via roll call of the representatives, after nomination at the start of each new Congress. Usually, despite the current multi-party system used, only two representatives are nominated, with nominations being agreed upon before each Congress during caucuses between the administration and opposition coalitions, with the chosen candidate of the majority coalition being almost certain to win by a large margin. The two competing candidates by tradition vote for each other; those who voted for the speaker-elect is assigned as the "majority" coalition while those who didn't are the minority coalition, with the losing candidate usually being named as minority leader.

In the 2013 election for the speakership, there were three candidates. Feliciano Belmonte Jr. was elected speaker over Ronaldo Zamora and Martin Romualdez. In this case, the candidates did not vote for each other, and the second-placed candidate, Zamora, became the minority leader and headed the minority bloc. Romualdez, who placed third, became the leader of the "independent minority" bloc. Only the majority and minority blocs were given seats in committees. There was a possibility that neither candidate would secure a majority of votes; it is undetermined what procedure would be followed in such an event.

== Election ==
=== Nominations ===
On September 17, 2025, Martin Romualdez resigned from his position as speaker of the House, a move he noted was intended to restore the chamber's credibility and was in response to his cousin, President Bongbong Marcos's, call for accountability, after he was implicated in the flood control scandal. Romualdez was said to have recommended to House party leaders Deputy Speaker Bojie Dy of Isabela, a partymate of Marcos in Partido Federal ng Pilipinas, as his successor. Dy was later nominated by Ralph Tulfo of Quezon City after the table for nominations was declared open by Deputy Speaker Kristine Singson-Meehan, the sole nominee in the election. Notable votes were those of independent members, who belonged to neither the majority nor the minority bloc: Albee Benitez of Bacolod, Duke Frasco of Cebu, and Toby Tiangco of Navotas, who were noted to have not supported Romualdez but voted for Dy in the election.

=== Results ===
September 2025 election for speaker
Party	Nominees	Nominated by	Votes	%
PFP	Bojie Dy (Isabela–6th)	Ralph Tulfo	253	90.04
Abstention			28	9.96
Total votes			281	100.00

List of representatives who participated in the election
No.	Representative	Constituency	Party	Original bloc (after the July 2025 election for speaker)	Ballot vote cast	New bloc
1	Joseph Bernos	Abra at-large	Lakas	Majority	Dy	Majority
2	Dale Corvera	Agusan del Norte at-large	Lakas	Majority	Dy	Majority
3	Alfel Bascug	Agusan del Sur–1st	NUP	Majority	Dy	Majority
4	Eddiebong Plaza	Agusan del Sur–2nd	NUP	Majority	Dy	Majority
5	Jess Marquez	Aklan–1st	NPC	Majority	Dy	Majority
6	Florencio Miraflores	Aklan–2nd	NPC	Majority	Dy	Majority
7	Krisel Lagman	Albay–1st	Liberal	Minority	Abstain	Minority
8	Caloy Loria	Albay–2nd	NUP	Majority	Dy	Majority
9	Adrian Salceda	Albay–3rd	Lakas	Majority	Dy	Majority
10	Ronaldo Puno	Antipolo–1st	NUP	Majority	Dy	Majority
11	Romeo Acop	Antipolo–2nd	NUP	Majority	Dy	Majority
12	Antonio Legarda Jr.	Antique at-large	NPC	Majority	Dy	Majority
13	Eleanor Begtang	Apayao at-large	NPC	Majority	Dy	Majority
14	Rommel T. Angara	Aurora at-large	LDP	Majority	Dy	Majority
15	Albee Benitez	Bacolod at-large	Independent	Independent	Dy	Majority
16	Mauricio Domogan	Baguio at-large	Lakas	Majority	Dy	Majority
17	Yusop Alano	Basilan at-large	PFP	Majority	Dy	Majority
18	Antonino Roman III	Bataan–1st	Lakas	Majority	Dy	Majority
19	Albert Garcia	Bataan–2nd	NUP	Majority	Dy	Majority
20	Maria Angela Garcia	Bataan–3rd	NUP	Majority	Dy	Majority
21	Jun Gato	Batanes at-large	NPC	Majority	Dy	Majority
22	Leandro Leviste	Batangas–1st	Lakas	Majority	Dy	Majority
23	Gerville Luistro	Batangas–2nd	Lakas	Majority	Dy	Majority
24	King Collantes	Batangas–3rd	NPC	Majority	Dy	Majority
25	Caloy Bolilia	Batangas–4th	Nacionalista	Majority	Dy	Majority
26	Beverley Dimacuha	Batangas–5th	Nacionalista	Majority	Dy	Majority
27	Ryan Recto	Batangas–6th	Nacionalista	Majority	Dy	Majority
28	Eric Yap	Benguet at-large	Lakas	Majority	Dy	Majority
29	Gerardo Espina Jr.	Biliran at-large	Lakas	Majority	Dy	Majority
30	Arman Dimaguila	Biñan at-large	Lakas	Majority	Dy	Majority
31	John Geesnell Yap	Bohol–1st	LDP	Majority	Dy	Majority
32	Jose Manuel Alba	Bukidnon–1st	Lakas	Majority	Dy	Majority
33	Jonathan Keith Flores	Bukidnon–2nd	Lakas	Majority	Dy	Majority
34	Audrey Zubiri	Bukidnon–3rd	PFP	Minority	Abstain	Minority
35	Laarni Roque	Bukidnon–4th	Nacionalista	Majority	Dy	Majority
36	Danny Domingo	Bulacan–1st	NUP	Majority	Dy	Majority
37	Tina Pancho	Bulacan–2nd	NUP	Majority	Dy	Majority
38	Cholo Violago	Bulacan–3rd	Lakas	Majority	Dy	Majority
39	Linabelle Villarica	Bulacan–4th	PFP	Majority	Dy	Majority
40	Agay Cruz	Bulacan–5th	Lakas	Majority	Dy	Majority
41	Salvador Pleyto	Bulacan–6th	Lakas	Majority	Dy	Majority
42	Jose Aquino II	Butuan at-large	Lakas	Majority	Dy	Majority
43	Ramon Nolasco	Cagayan–1st	Lakas	Majority	Dy	Majority
44	Baby Alfonso	Cagayan–2nd	Lakas	Majority	Dy	Majority
45	Joseph Lara	Cagayan–3rd	Lakas	Majority	Dy	Majority
46	Lordan Suan	Cagayan de Oro–1st	Lakas	Majority	Dy	Majority
47	Rufus Rodriguez	Cagayan de Oro–2nd	CDP	Majority	Dy	Majority
48	Cha Hernandez	Calamba at-large	Lakas	Majority	Dy	Majority
49	Oscar Malapitan	Caloocan–1st	Nacionalista	Majority	Dy	Majority
50	Edgar Erice	Caloocan–2nd	Liberal	Minority	Abstain	Minority
51	Dean Asistio	Caloocan–3rd	Lakas	Majority	Dy	Majority
52	Josefina Tallado	Camarines Norte–1st	Lakas	Majority	Dy	Majority
53	Rosemarie Panotes	Camarines Norte–2nd	Lakas	Majority	Dy	Majority
54	Hori Horibata	Camarines Sur–1st	NUP	Majority	Dy	Majority
55	Luigi Villafuerte	Camarines Sur–2nd	NUP	Majority	Dy	Majority
56	Nelson Legacion	Camarines Sur–3rd	Lakas	Majority	Dy	Majority
57	Arnulf Bryan Fuentebella	Camarines Sur–4th	NPC	Majority	Dy	Majority
58	Miguel Luis Villafuerte	Camarines Sur–5th	NUP	Majority	Dy	Majority
59	Jurdin Jesus Romualdo	Camiguin at-large	Lakas	Majority	Dy	Majority
60	Howard Guintu	Capiz–1st	Independent	Majority	Dy	Majority
61	Jane Castro	Capiz–2nd	Lakas	Majority	Dy	Majority
62	Eulogio Rodriguez	Catanduanes at-large	PFP	Majority	Dy	Majority
63	Jolo Revilla	Cavite–1st	Lakas	Majority	Dy	Majority
64	Lani Mercado	Cavite–2nd	Lakas	Majority	Dy	Majority
65	Adrian Jay Advincula	Cavite–3rd	NUP	Majority	Dy	Majority
66	Kiko Barzaga	Cavite–4th	Independent	Minority	Abstain	Minority
67	Roy Loyola	Cavite–5th	NPC	Majority	Dy	Majority
68	Antonio Ferrer	Cavite–6th	NUP	Majority	Dy	Majority
69	Crispin Diego Remulla	Cavite–7th	NUP	Majority	Dy	Majority
70	Aniela Tolentino	Cavite–8th	NUP	Majority	Dy	Majority
71	Rhea Gullas	Cebu–1st	Lakas	Majority	Dy	Majority
72	Edsel Galeos	Cebu–2nd	Lakas	Majority	Dy	Majority
73	Karen Flores-Garcia	Cebu–3rd	NUP	Majority	Dy	Majority
74	Sun Shimura	Cebu–4th	PMP	Majority	Dy	Majority
75	Duke Frasco	Cebu–5th	1Cebu	Independent	Dy	Majority
76	Daphne Lagon	Cebu–6th	Lakas	Majority	Dy	Majority
77	Patricia Calderon	Cebu–7th	NPC	Majority	Dy	Majority
78	Rachel del Mar	Cebu City–1st	NPC	Minority	Dy	Majority
79	Eduardo Rama Jr.	Cebu City–2nd	Lakas	Majority	Dy	Majority
80	Edwin Cruzado	Cotabato–1st	Lakas	Majority	Dy	Majority
81	Rudy Caoagdan	Cotabato–2nd	Nacionalista	Majority	Dy	Majority
82	Samantha Santos	Cotabato–3rd	Lakas	Majority	Dy	Majority
83	Maricar Zamora	Davao de Oro–1st	Lakas	Majority	Dy	Majority
84	Jhong Ceniza	Davao de Oro–2nd	Lakas	Majority	Dy	Majority
85	De Carlo Uy	Davao del Norte–1st	Lakas	Majority	Dy	Majority
86	Jose Manuel Lagdameo	Davao del Norte–2nd	PFP	Majority	Dy	Majority
87	John Tracy Cagas	Davao del Sur at-large	Lakas	Majority	Dy	Majority
88	Nelson Dayanghirang Jr.	Davao Oriental–1st	Lakas	Majority	Dy	Majority
89	Cheeno Almario	Davao Oriental–2nd	NPC	Majority	Dy	Majority
90	Kaka Bag-ao	Dinagat Islands at-large	Liberal	Minority	Abstain	Minority
91	Sheen Gonzales	Eastern Samar at-large	Independent	Minority	Abstain	Minority
92	Shirlyn Bañas-Nograles	General Santos at-large	PDP	Majority	Dy	Majority
93	Solomon Chungalao	Ifugao at-large	NPC	Majority	Dy	Majority
94	Celso Regencia	Iligan at-large	Lakas	Majority	Dy	Majority
95	Sandro Marcos	Ilocos Norte–1st	PFP	Majority	Dy	Majority
96	Eugenio Angelo Barba	Ilocos Norte–2nd	Nacionalista	Majority	Dy	Majority
97	Ronald Singson	Ilocos Sur–1st	NPC	Majority	Dy	Majority
98	Kristine Singson-Meehan	Ilocos Sur–2nd	NPC	Majority	Presiding	Majority
99	Janette Garin	Iloilo–1st	Lakas	Majority	Dy	Majority
100	Kathryn Joyce Gorriceta	Iloilo–2nd	Lakas	Majority	Dy	Majority
101	Lorenz Defensor	Iloilo–3rd	NUP	Majority	Dy	Majority
102	Ferjenel Biron	Iloilo–4th	Nacionalista	Majority	Dy	Majority
103	Julienne Baronda	Iloilo City at-large	Lakas	Majority	Dy	Majority
104	Tonypet Albano	Isabela–1st	Lakas	Majority	Dy	Majority
105	Ed Christopher Go	Isabela–2nd	Lakas	Majority	Dy	Majority
106	Ian Paul Dy	Isabela–3rd	Lakas	Majority	Dy	Majority
107	Joseph Tan	Isabela–4th	Lakas	Majority	Dy	Majority
108	Mike Dy III	Isabela–5th	Lakas	Majority	Dy	Majority
109	Bojie Dy	Isabela–6th	PFP	Majority	Dy	Majority
110	Caroline Agyao	Kalinga at-large	PFP	Majority	Dy	Majority
111	Paolo Ortega	La Union–1st	Lakas	Majority	Dy	Majority
112	Ann Matibag	Laguna–1st	Lakas	Majority	Dy	Majority
113	Ramil Hernandez	Laguna–2nd	Lakas	Majority	Dy	Majority
114	Loreto Amante	Laguna–3rd	Lakas	Majority	Dy	Majority
115	Benjamin Agarao Jr.	Laguna–4th	PFP	Majority	Dy	Majority
116	Imelda Dimaporo	Lanao del Norte–1st	PFP	Majority	Dy	Majority
117	Aminah Dimaporo	Lanao del Norte–2nd	Lakas	Majority	Dy	Majority
118	Zia Alonto Adiong	Lanao del Sur–1st	Lakas	Majority	Dy	Majority
119	Yasser Balindong	Lanao del Sur–2nd	Lakas	Majority	Dy	Majority
120	Junard Chan	Lapu-Lapu City at-large	PFP	Majority	Dy	Majority
121	Mark Anthony Santos	Las Piñas at-large	Independent	Majority	Dy	Majority
122	Martin Romualdez	Leyte–1st	Lakas	Majority	Dy	Majority
123	Lolita Javier	Leyte–2nd	Nacionalista	Majority	Dy	Majority
124	Anna Veloso-Tuazon	Leyte–3rd	NUP	Majority	Dy	Majority
125	Carl Cari	Leyte–5th	Lakas	Majority	Dy	Majority
126	Dimple Mastura	Maguindanao del Norte at-large	Lakas	Majority	Dy	Majority
127	Esmael Mangudadatu	Maguindanao del Sur at-large	PFP	Majority	Dy	Majority
128	Monique Lagdameo	Makati–1st	MKTZNU	Majority	Dy	Majority
129	Alden Almario	Makati–2nd	MKTZNU	Majority	Dy	Majority
130	Antolin Oreta III	Malabon at-large	NUP	Majority	Dy	Majority
131	Alexandria Gonzales	Mandaluyong at-large	NUP	Majority	Dy	Majority
132	Emmarie Dizon	Mandaue at-large	Lakas	Majority	Dy	Majority
133	Ernix Dionisio	Manila–1st	Lakas	Majority	Dy	Majority
134	Rolan Valeriano	Manila–2nd	NUP	Majority	Dy	Majority
135	Joel Chua	Manila–3rd	Lakas	Majority	Dy	Majority
136	Giselle Lazaro-Maceda	Manila–4th	Asenso Manileño	Majority	Dy	Majority
137	Irwin Tieng	Manila–5th	Lakas	Majority	Dy	Majority
138	Marcelino Teodoro	Marikina's 1st	NUP	Majority	Dy	Majority
139	Miro Quimbo	Marikina–2nd	Lakas	Majority	Dy	Majority
140	Reynaldo Salvacion	Marinduque at-large	Lakas	Majority	Dy	Majority
141	Olga Kho	Masbate–2nd	Lakas	Majority	Dy	Majority
142	Jason Almonte	Misamis Occidental–1st	Nacionalista	Majority	Dy	Majority
143	Karen Lagbas	Misamis Oriental–1st	NUP	Majority	Dy	Majority
144	Yevgeny Emano	Misamis Oriental–2nd	Nacionalista	Majority	Dy	Majority
145	Maximo Dalog Jr.	Mountain Province at-large	Nacionalista	Majority	Dy	Majority
146	Toby Tiangco	Navotas at-large	Navoteño	Independent	Dy	Majority
147	Alfredo Marañon III	Negros Occidental–2nd	NUP	Majority	Dy	Majority
148	Javi Benitez	Negros Occidental–3rd	PFP	Majority	Dy	Majority
149	Jeffrey Ferrer	Negros Occidental–4th	NUP	Majority	Dy	Majority
150	Dino Yulo	Negros Occidental–5th	Lakas	Majority	Dy	Majority
151	Mercedes Alvarez-Lansang	Negros Occidental–6th	NPC	Majority	Dy	Majority
152	Emmanuel Iway	Negros Oriental–1st	PFP	Majority	Dy	Majority
153	Maisa Sagarbarria	Negros Oriental–2nd	Lakas	Majority	Dy	Majority
154	Janice Degamo	Negros Oriental–3rd	Lakas	Majority	Dy	Majority
155	Niko Raul Daza	Northern Samar–1st	NUP	Minority	Abstain	Minority
156	Edwin Ongchuan	Northern Samar–2nd	PFP	Majority	Dy	Majority
157	Mika Suansing	Nueva Ecija–1st	Lakas	Majority	Dy	Majority
158	Kokoy Salvador	Nueva Ecija–2nd	PFP	Majority	Dy	Majority
159	Jay Vergara	Nueva Ecija–3rd	PFP	Majority	Dy	Majority
160	Emeng Pascual	Nueva Ecija–4th	Lakas	Majority	Dy	Majority
161	Tim Cayton	Nueva Vizcaya at-large	Aksyon	Majority	Dy	Majority
162	Odie Tarriela	Occidental Mindoro at-large	PFP	Majority	Dy	Majority
163	Arnan Panaligan	Oriental Mindoro–1st	Lakas	Majority	Dy	Majority
164	Alfonso Umali Jr.	Oriental Mindoro–2nd	Liberal	Majority	Dy	Majority
165	Rose Salvame	Palawan–1st	PRP	Majority	Dy	Majority
166	Jose Alvarez	Palawan–2nd	NPC	Majority	Dy	Majority
167	Gil Acosta Jr.	Palawan–3rd	Lakas	Majority	Dy	Majority
168	Carmelo Lazatin Jr.	Pampanga–1st	PFP	Majority	Dy	Majority
169	Mica Gonzales	Pampanga–3rd	Lakas	Majority	Dy	Majority
170	Anna York Bondoc	Pampanga–4th	Nacionalista	Majority	Dy	Majority
171	Arthur Celeste	Pangasinan–1st	Nacionalista	Majority	Dy	Majority
172	Mark Cojuangco	Pangasinan–2nd	NPC	Majority	Dy	Majority
173	Maria Rachel Arenas	Pangasinan–3rd	Lakas	Majority	Dy	Majority
174	Gina de Venecia	Pangasinan–4th	Lakas	Majority	Dy	Majority
175	Ramon Guico Jr.	Pangasinan–5th	Lakas	Majority	Dy	Majority
176	Marlyn Primicias-Agabas	Pangasinan–6th	Lakas	Majority	Dy	Majority
177	Eric Olivarez	Parañaque–1st	Lakas	Majority	Dy	Majority
178	Brian Yamsuan	Parañaque–2nd	NUP	Majority	Dy	Majority
179	Antonino Calixto	Pasay at-large	Lakas	Majority	Dy	Majority
180	Roman Romulo	Pasig at-large	NPC	Majority	Dy	Majority
181	Mark Enverga	Quezon–1st	NPC	Majority	Dy	Majority
182	David Suarez	Quezon–2nd	Lakas	Majority	Dy	Majority
183	Reynante Arrogancia	Quezon–3rd	NPC	Majority	Dy	Majority
184	Keith Micah Tan	Quezon–4th	NPC	Majority	Dy	Majority
185	Arjo Atayde	Quezon City–1st	Nacionalista	Majority	Dy	Majority
186	Ralph Tulfo	Quezon City–2nd	PFP	Majority	Dy	Majority
187	Franz Pumaren	Quezon City–3rd	NUP	Majority	Dy	Majority
188	Bong Suntay	Quezon City–4th	UNA	Minority	Abstain	Minority
189	Patrick Michael Vargas	Quezon City–5th	Lakas	Majority	Dy	Majority
190	Marivic Co-Pilar	Quezon City–6th	NUP	Majority	Dy	Majority
191	Midy Cua	Quirino at-large	Lakas	Majority	Dy	Majority
192	Mia Ynares	Rizal–1st	NPC	Majority	Dy	Majority
193	Dino Tanjuatco	Rizal–2nd	NPC	Majority	Dy	Majority
194	Jose Arturo Garcia Jr.	Rizal–3rd	NPC	Majority	Dy	Majority
195	Dennis Hernandez	Rizal–4th	NPC	Majority	Dy	Majority
196	Eleandro Jesus Madrona	Romblon at-large	Nacionalista	Majority	Dy	Majority
197	Stephen James Tan	Samar–1st	Nacionalista	Minority	Abstain	Minority
198	Reynolds Michael Tan	Samar–2nd	Lakas	Minority	Abstain	Minority
199	Arthur Robes	San Jose del Monte at-large	Lakas	Majority	Dy	Majority
200	Bel Zamora	San Juan at-large	Lakas	Majority	Dy	Majority
201	Roy Gonzales	Santa Rosa at-large	Lakas	Majority	Dy	Majority
202	Steve Solon	Sarangani at-large	Lakas	Majority	Dy	Majority
203	Dette Escudero	Sorsogon–1st	NPC	Majority	Dy	Majority
204	Wowo Fortes	Sorsogon–2nd	NPC	Majority	Dy	Majority
205	Ed Lumayag	South Cotabato–1st	PFP	Majority	Dy	Majority
206	Dinand Hernandez	South Cotabato–2nd	PFP	Majority	Dy	Majority
207	Dibu Tuan	South Cotabato–3rd	Lakas	Majority	Dy	Majority
208	Roger Mercado	Southern Leyte–1st	NPC	Majority	Dy	Majority
209	Christopherson Yap	Southern Leyte–2nd	Lakas	Majority	Dy	Majority
210	Ruth Sakaluran	Sultan Kudarat–1st	Lakas	Majority	Dy	Majority
211	Bella Suansing	Sultan Kudarat–2nd	PFP	Majority	Dy	Majority
212	Abdulmunir Arbison	Sulu–2nd	Lakas	Majority	Dy	Majority
213	Francisco Matugas	Surigao del Norte–1st	Lakas	Majority	Dy	Majority
214	Bernadette Barbers	Surigao del Norte–2nd	Nacionalista	Majority	Dy	Majority
215	Romeo Momo	Surigao del Sur–1st	Nacionalista	Majority	Dy	Majority
216	Alexander Pimentel	Surigao del Sur–2nd	PFP	Majority	Dy	Majority
217	Ading Cruz	Taguig–Pateros at-large	Nacionalista	Majority	Dy	Majority
218	Daniel Bocobo	Taguig at-large	Nacionalista	Majority	Dy	Majority
219	Cristy Angeles	Tarlac–2nd	PFP	Majority	Dy	Majority
220	Bong Rivera	Tarlac–3rd	NPC	Majority	Dy	Majority
221	Dimszar Sali	Tawi-Tawi at-large	NUP	Majority	Dy	Majority
222	Kenneth Gatchalian	Valenzeula–1st	NPC	Majority	Dy	Majority
223	Gerald Galang	Valenzuela–2nd	Lakas	Majority	Dy	Majority
224	Jay Khonghun	Zambales–1st	Lakas	Majority	Dy	Majority
225	Bing Maniquiz	Zambales–2nd	Lakas	Majority	Dy	Majority
226	Katrina Reiko Chua-Tai	Zamboanga City–1st	Independent	Majority	Dy	Majority
227	Jerry Perez	Zamboanga City–2nd	AZAP	Majority	Dy	Majority
228	Pinpin Uy	Zamboanga del Norte–1st	Lakas	Majority	Dy	Majority
229	Irene Labadlabad	Zamboanga del Norte–2nd	Lakas	Majority	Dy	Majority
230	Ian Amatong	Zamboanga del Norte–3rd	Liberal	Majority	Dy	Majority
231	Joseph Yu	Zamboanga del Sur–1st	Lakas	Majority	Dy	Majority
232	Victoria Yu	Zamboanga del Sur–2nd	Lakas	Majority	Dy	Majority
233	Marlo Bancoro	Zamboanga Sibugay–1st	PFP	Majority	Dy	Majority
234	Marly Hofer–Hasim	Zamboanga Sibugay–2nd	PFP	Majority	Dy	Majority
235	Rodge Gutierrez	Party-list	1-Rider	Majority	Dy	Majority
236	Nathaniel Oducado	Party-list	1Tahanan	Majority	Dy	Majority
237	Iris Marie Montes	Party-list	4K	Minority	Abstain	Minority
238	Marcelino Libanan	Party-list	4Ps	Minority	Abstain	Minority
239	Jonathan Clement Abalos	Party-list	4Ps	Minority	Abstain	Minority
240	Maximo Rodriguez Jr.	Party-list	Abamin	Majority	Dy	Majority
241	Manuel Frederick Ko	Party-list	Abang Lingkod	Majority	Dy	Majority
242	Antonio Tinio	Party-list	ACT Teachers	Minority	Abstain	Minority
243	Jocelyn Tulfo	Party-list	ACT-CIS	Majority	Dy	Majority
244	Edvic Yap	Party-list	ACT-CIS	Majority	Dy	Majority
245	Nicanor Briones	Party-list	AGAP	Minority	Dy	Majority
246	Bryan Revilla	Party-list	Agimat	Majority	Dy	Majority
247	Chel Diokno	Party-list	Akbayan	Minority	Abstain	Minority
248	Perci Cendaña	Party-list	Akbayan	Minority	Abstain	Minority
249	Dadah Kiram Ismula	Party-list	Akbayan	Minority	Abstain	Minority
250	Alfredo Garbin	Party-list	Ako Bicol	Majority	Dy	Majority
251	Sonny Lagon	Party-list	Ako Bisaya	Majority	Dy	Majority
252	Richelle Singson-Michael	Party-list	Ako Ilocano Ako	Majority	Dy	Majority
253	Maria Cristina Lopez	Party-list	ALONA	Majority	Dy	Majority
254	Sergio Dagooc	Party-list	APEC	Minority	Abstain	Minority
255	Henry Oaminal Jr.	Party-list	Asenso Pinoy	Majority	Dy	Majority
256	Roberto Nazal Jr.	Party-list	BH	Minority	Abstain	Minority
257	Terry Ridon	Party-list	Bicol Saro	Minority	Abstain	Minority
258	Brian Poe	Party-list	FPJ Panday Bayanihan	Majority	Dy	Majority
259	Jan Rurik Padiernos	Party-list	GP	Minority	Dy	Majority
260	Renee Co	Party-list	Kabataan	Minority	Abstain	Minority
261	Caroline Tanchay	Party-list	Kamalayan	Majority	Dy	Majority
262	Eli San Fernando	Party-list	Kamanggagawa	Minority	Abstain	Minority
263	Munir Arbison Jr.	Party-list	Kapuso PM	Majority	Dy	Majority
264	Allan Ty	Party-list	LPGMA	Minority	Abstain	Minority
265	Girlie Veloso	Party-list	Malasakit@Bayanihan	Majority	Dy	Majority
266	Leila de Lima	Party-list	ML	Minority	Abstain	Minority
267	Florabel Yatco	Party-list	Nanay	Majority	Dy	Majority
268	Maria Kristina Jihan Glepa	Party-list	One Coop	Majority	Dy	Majority
269	Presley de Jesus	Party-list	Philreca	Minority	Abstain	Minority
270	Franz Vincent Legazpi	Party-list	Pinoy Workers	Majority	Dy	Majority
271	Jernie Jett Nisay	Party-list	Pusong Pinoy	Minority	Abstain	Minority
272	Paolo Marcoleta	Party-list	Sagip	Minority	Abstain	Minority
273	Rodolfo Ordanes	Party-list	Senior Citizens	Majority	Dy	Majority
274	Ching Bernos	Party-list	Solid North	Majority	Dy	Majority
275	Rolando Macasaet	Party-list	SSS-GSIS Pensyonado	Majority	Dy	Majority
276	Arlyn Ayon	Party-list	Swerte	Minority	Abstain	Minority
277	Jose Teves Jr.	Party-list	TGP	Majority	Dy	Majority
278	Jude Acidre	Party-list	Tingog	Majority	Dy	Majority
279	Johanne Monich Bautista	Party-list	Trabaho	Majority	Dy	Majority
280	Raymond Mendoza	Party-list	TUCP	Majority	Dy	Majority
281	Milagros Magsaysay	Party-list	United Senior Citizens	Majority	Dy	Majority
282	Jojo Ang	Party-list	Uswag Ilonggo	Majority	Dy	Majority
