= Martin Romualdez =

Filipino politician and businessman (born 1963)

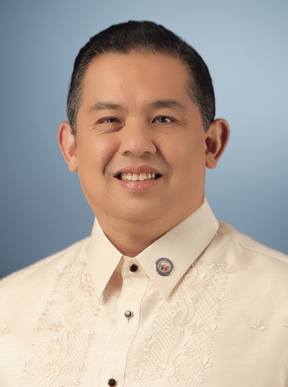
- Official portrait, 2025

Member of the Philippine House of Representatives from Leyte's 1st district
- Incumbent
- Assumed office June 30, 2019
- Preceded by: Yedda Marie Romualdez
- In office June 30, 2007 – June 30, 2016
- Preceded by: Remedios Petilla
- Succeeded by: Yedda Marie Romualdez

28th Speaker of the House of Representatives of the Philippines
- In office July 25, 2022 – September 17, 2025
- Preceded by: Lord Allan Velasco
- Succeeded by: Bojie Dy

House Majority Leader
- In office July 22, 2019 – June 30, 2022
- Preceded by: Fredenil Castro
- Succeeded by: Mannix Dalipe

Personal details
- Born: Ferdinand Martin Gomez Romualdez; November 14, 1963 (age 62) Manila, Philippines
- Party: Lakas (since 2008)
- Other political affiliations: KAMPI (2007–2008)
- Spouse: Yedda Marie Kittilstvedt (m. 1999)
- Children: 4
- Parent(s): Benjamin Romualdez; Juliette Gomez
- Relatives: Romualdez family
- Education: Cornell University (BA); University of the Philippines Diliman (LL.B.)
- Criminal information
- Status: Detained; awaiting trial
- Criminal charge: Plunder

Details
- Date apprehended: September 7, 2026
- Imprisoned at: New Quezon City Jail

Ferdinand Martin Gomez Romualdez Sr. (Tagalog pronunciation: [ˈgɔmɛs ɾoˈmwɐldɛs], born November 14, 1963) is a Filipino politician, businessman, and lawyer who served as the 28th speaker of the House of Representatives from 2022 until his resignation in 2025 which followed claims of his alleged involvement in ghost flood control projects. He has also served as the representative for Leyte's first district since 2019 and previously from 2007 to 2016. He was previously the House Majority Leader from 2019 to 2022. He is a first cousin of President Bongbong Marcos.

Born to the fourth generation of the Romualdez family of Tacloban, Leyte, he graduated from Cornell University in the United States and pursued legal studies at the University of the Philippines College of Law, being admitted to the bar in 1993. Romualdez entered government in 2007 after being elected to the House of Representatives, being reelected in 2010 and 2013. Upon being term-limited as a representative in 2016, he sought a seat in the Senate and lost.

Romualdez was elected back to the lower chamber in 2019. During his second tenure, he managed the successful vice presidential campaign of Sara Duterte. He was elected as speaker in 2022. During his speakership, Romualdez played a key role in the Marcos–Duterte rift and pursued constitutional reforms that were marred by irregularities.

Romualdez was arrested on September 7, 2026 after Sandiganbayan charged him over ₱7.4-billion plunder case and is currently detained at the Quezon City Jail in Payatas.

== Early life and education ==
Ferdinand Martin Gomez Romualdez is the third child of former Leyte Governor and Ambassador to the United States Benjamin Romualdez and Juliette Gomez-Romualdez. His father was once named by Forbes as the 30th richest man in the Philippines with a net worth of ₱3.3 billion, which the Presidential Commission on Good Government claimed was ill-gotten. He is the nephew of former first lady Imelda Marcos and former President Ferdinand Marcos, while incumbent President Bongbong and Senator Imee Marcos are his cousins.

Romualdez attended Cornell University in the United States from 1981 to 1985, graduating with a Bachelor of Arts in government. In 1988, he earned a Certificate of Special Studies in Administration and Management from Harvard Extension School. He later enrolled at the University of the Philippines College of Law in 1988, becoming a Upsilon Sigma Phi fraternity member. He earned his Bachelor of Laws degree in 1992. He was admitted to the bar in 1993.

In 1992, Romualdez was appointed concurrent trustee and president of the Doña Remedios Trinidad Romualdez Medical Foundation and Dr. Vicente Orestes Romualdez Educational Foundation, both of which are owned by his family.

In 1995, he started work as a director and legal counsel for the CARPA Realty Development Corporation. Prior to his political career, Romualdez served as chairman of the board for Equitable PCI Bank. He also served as a chairman of Benguet Corporation.

== House of Representatives ==
=== Elections ===
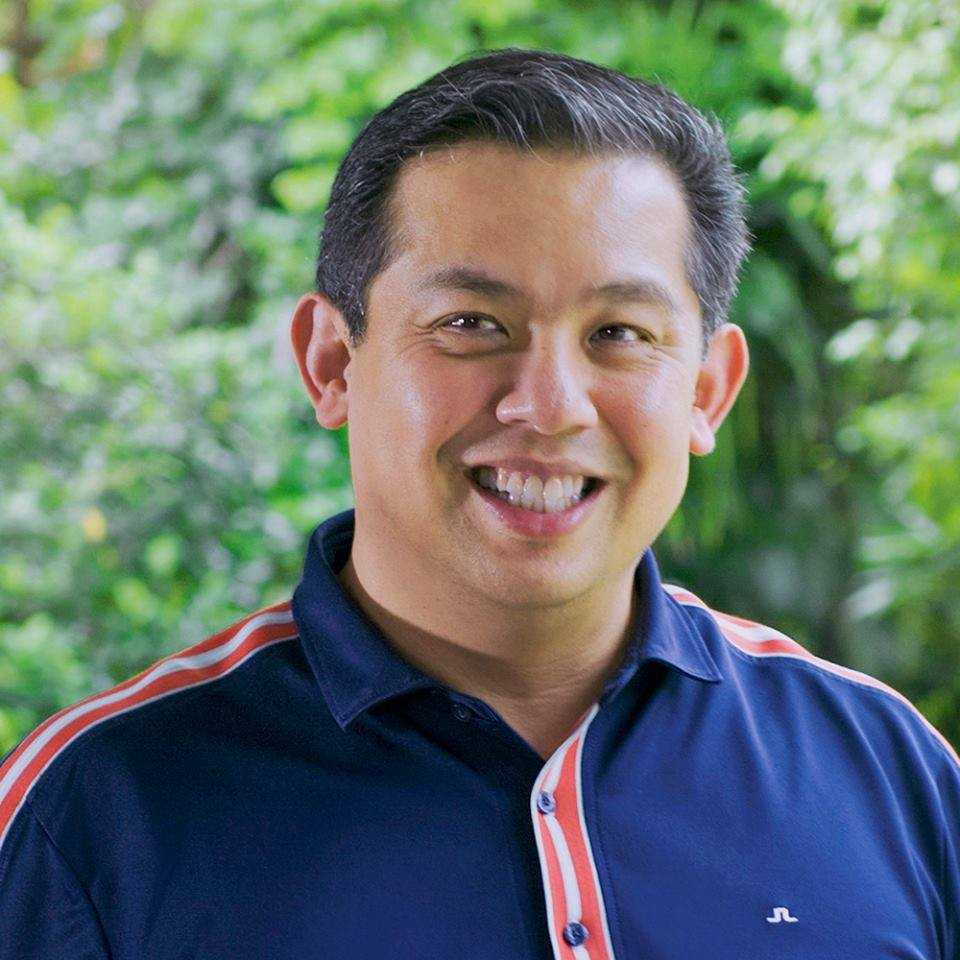
Romualdez in 2009.

Romualdez was first elected as representative of Leyte's first district in 2007. He was re-elected in 2010 and in 2013.

In April 2014, Romualdez expressed interest in running for senator in the 2016 elections. He filed his certificate of candidacy for senator on October 13, 2015. On November 7, 2015, Romualdez declared his support for presidential candidate Jejomar Binay. In 2016 Davao City Mayor and presidential aspirant Rodrigo Duterte also endorsed the candidacy of Romualdez. He ran under the Lakas–CMD party, which he is the national president of, but ultimately failed to win a senate seat, placing 15th.

In the 2019 elections, Romualdez again won as representative of Leyte's first district. Romualdez was later elected as Majority Floor Leader of the House of Representatives of the Philippines for the 18th Congress. He was re-elected in 2022 and in 2025.

In December 2021, Romualdez became the campaign manager of Sara Duterte's vice presidential campaign alongside Davao Occidental Governor Claude Bautista.

=== Tenure ===
Romualdez authored House Bill No. 1039, which was enacted as Republic Act No. 10754, expanding benefits and privileges for persons with disabilities in the Philippines and improving their access to essential goods and services through VAT exemptions and statutory discounts.

On July 10, 2020, Martin and his wife Yedda Marie Romualdez were among the 70 representatives who voted to reject the franchise renewal of ABS-CBN.

== House Speaker (2022–2025) ==
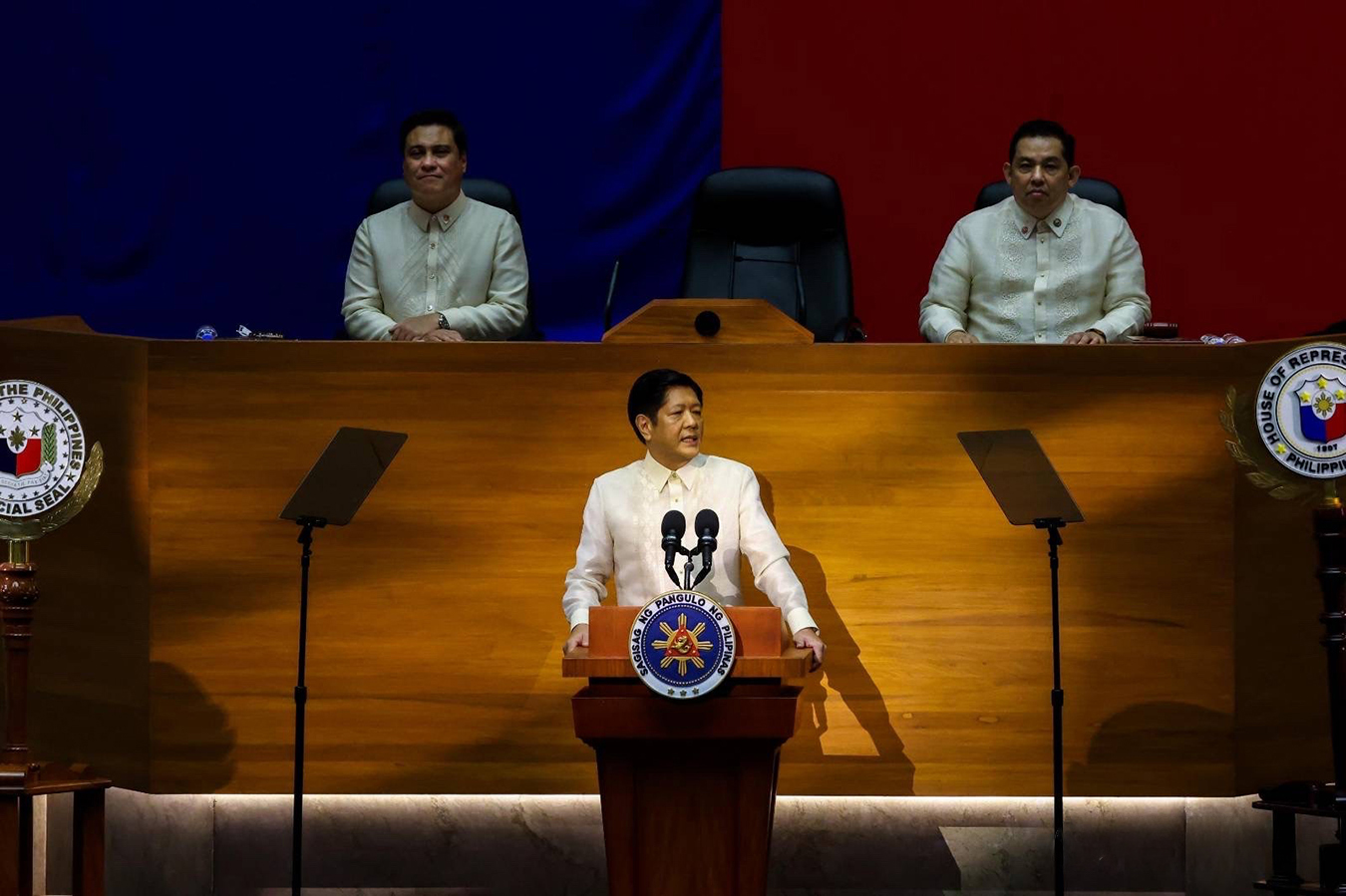
Romualdez (right) during President Bongbong Marcos's first State of the Nation Address in 2022.

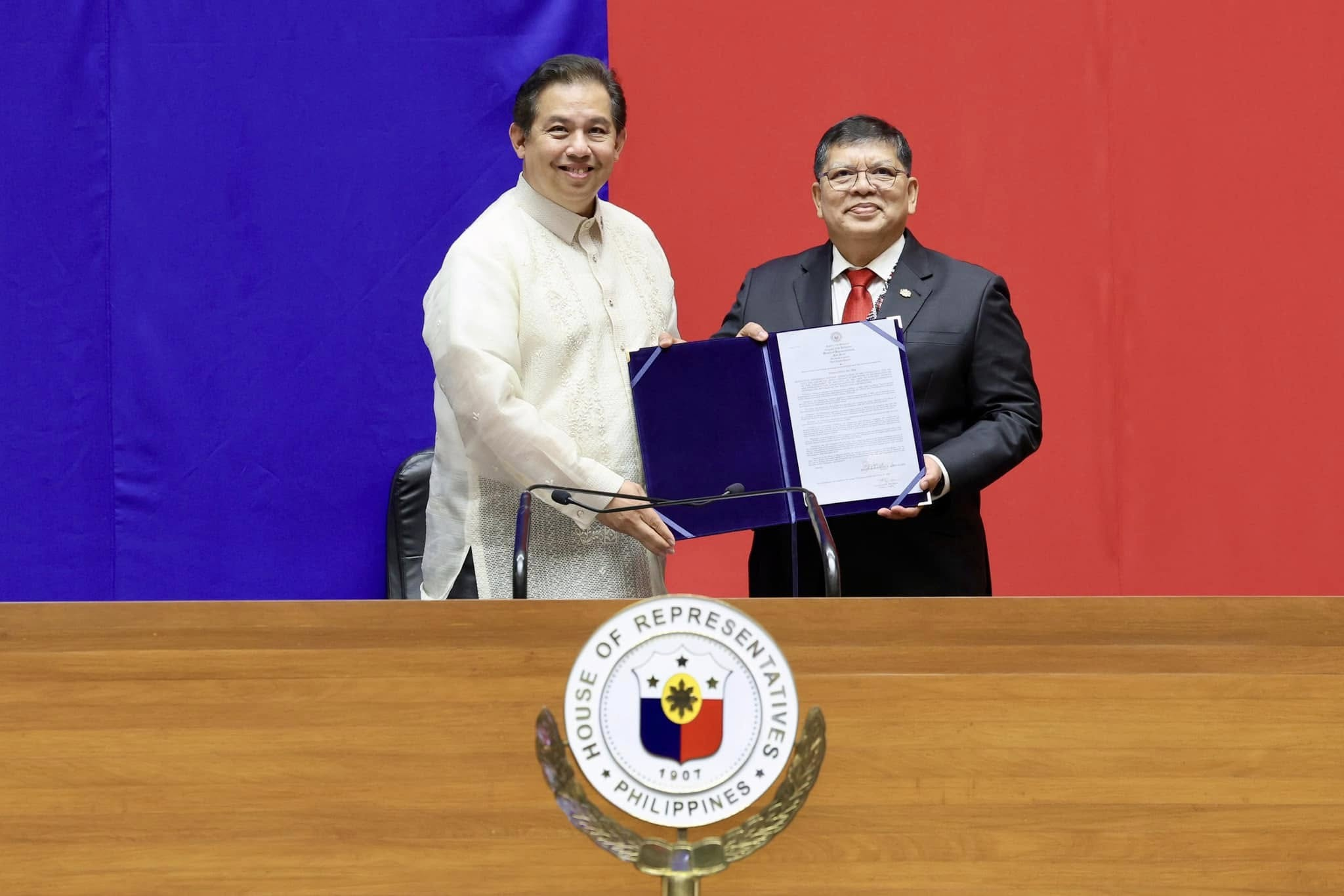
Romualdez and his Malaysian counterpart, Speaker of the Dewan Rakyat Johari Abdul, in 2025.

Romualdez was as Speaker of the House of Representatives elected in July 2022, receiving the votes of the 284 House members. During his speakership, Romualdez also assumed legislative caretaker roles for the majority of the vacated districts during the 19th Congress, such as Cavite–7th (later filled by Crispin Diego Remulla), Negros Oriental–3rd, Batangas–6th, Palawan–3rd, Palawan–1st, Cavite–4th, and Negros Occidental–3rd.

In November 2022, Romualdez, along with six other lawmakers, filed House Bill No. 6398 proposing the creation of the Maharlika Investment Fund, a sovereign wealth fund for the Philippines inspired by South Korea's Korea Investment Corporation. The proposal drew mixed reactions from economists and mostly negative reactions from the general public.

In 2023, the House of Representatives approved House Bill 8937 (an Act Enhancing the Fiscal Regime for the Mining Industry), which will reduce taxes for the mining industry and potentially benefit mining companies owned by the Romualdez family.

In February 2025, election watchdog Kontra Daya tagged Tingog Sinirangan as among the party-list groups with ties to political dynasties in the Philippines, with its nominees being the wife and son of Romualdez. Kontra Daya said that more than half of party-list organizations vying for slots in the House of Representatives do not represent marginalized groups, having links to political dynasties, big business, or corruption cases. Tingog Sinirangan's candidacy deserves scrutiny, especially since House Speaker Romualdez is a cousin of President Bongbong Marcos, according to Kontra Daya.

From 2023 to 2025, Romualdez received ₱14.4 billion of "allocable" funds from the national budget, which is the second highest amount approved by Congress for its members in the House of Representatives. "Allocable" funds have been criticized by the People’s Budget Coalition as a new form of pork barrel, since it goes to "politically determined projects that crowd out more equitable and accountable public spending".

The Right to Know Right Now Coalition alleged that public funds went to massive corruption through congressional insertions and unprogrammed funds, which were channeled to flood-control projects that rose significantly in 2023 and 2024 while Romualdez was House Speaker, Zaldo Co was House Committee on Appropriations chair, Francis Escudero was Senate president, and Joel Villanueva was majority floor leader.

=== Role in the Marcos–Duterte rift ===
Romualdez was instrumental in the deepening rift between the Marcos and Duterte families. Under Romualdez's watch, the House denied Vice President and Education Secretary Sara Duterte's requests for confidential funds that could be used for the Education department's proposed Reserve Officers' Training Corps program but swiftly passed the same funds for the Office of the President; this led Sara's father and former President Rodrigo Duterte to allege a connivance between Romualdez and the leftist Makabayan bloc in stripping Sara of confidential funds. Rodrigo Duterte criticized the House as the "most rotten institution" in the country and demanded an audit of the House under Romualdez; Duterte's comments offended some House members including Romualdez, prompting the House to issue a loyalty check resolution in support of Romualdez. Shortly after, the House expelled Duterte's political allies former president and Representatives Gloria Macapagal-Arroyo and Isidro Ungab as Deputy House Speakers for failing to sign the resolution. Several House members of Duterte's party, PDP–Laban, later party-switched, mostly to the Romualdez-led Lakas-CMD, In late November 2023, reports circulated that some House members want Vice President Sara impeached. The House later began tackling at least three house resolutions filed separately by the Makabayan bloc, House Human Rights Panel chairperson Bienvenido Abante Jr. and 1-Rider Partylist Rep. Ramon Rodrigo Gutierrez, and Albay 1st District Rep. Edcel Lagman urging the Marcos administration to cooperate with the International Criminal Court's investigation into Duterte's war on drugs; Romualdez denied prioritizing the measures.

A month later, the National Telecommunications Commission imposed a 30-day suspension on SMNI, a media network which hosted Rodrigo Duterte's platform Gikan sa Masa, Para sa Masa, after the House adopted a resolution filed by PBA Partylist Representative Margarita Nograles, who claimed that the network was propagating false information. Two hosts of another SMNI talk show, Laban Kasama ang Bayan, were detained and cited in contempt by the House after one of its hosts–Jeffrey Celiz–refused to reveal his source for his claim that Romualdez had ₱1.8 billion worth of travel funds.

Amid the feud between the Marcos and Duterte clans in late April 2023, Romualdez said the House will probe into an agreement Duterte made during his presidency with Chinese leader Xi Jinping. Under the agreement, Duterte agreed to maintain the "status quo" in the South China Sea to avoid escalating a war. Political analyst Ronald Llamas said the probe was engineered by President Bongbong Marcos as a "political payback" to Duterte's verbal attacks and to reduce Duterte's political influence ahead of the 2025 midterm elections.

=== Charter change attempts ===
Efforts to amend the Constitution intensified in January 2024 after pro-Charter Change group, People's Initiative for Reform Modernization and Action (PIRMA), admitted talking with Romualdez and claimed responsibility for a signature drive campaign that attempted to start a People's Initiative. The proponents proposed that both chambers of the Congress—the House of Representatives and the Senate—vote jointly on the proposed amendments in a constitutional assembly; consequentially, the 24-member Senate unanimously rejected the proposal since its vote would be overpowered by the 316-member House. The signature drive has been marred by allegations of vote-buying, and by the evening of January 23, the proponents claimed to have achieved the required minimum 12 percent of national voters threshold. Romualdez denied spearheading the initiative, although a video evidence showing the opposite was later disclosed by Senator Francis Escudero. As of December 2023, Romualdez is the president of the Philippine Constitution Association.

=== Controversy over flood control projects and resignation ===
Months leading up to the height of the flood control projects controversy in the Philippines in September 2025, media speculation arose regarding a possible leadership change in the lower house, especially after Sarah Discaya implicated Romualdez in the alleged anomalies. By September 6, Executive Secretary Lucas Bersamin rebuked Congress under Romualdez's speakership, urging the speaker to "clean up your house first". Romualdez, along with his ally and former appropriations chair Zaldy Co, has drawn criticism over alleged involvement in the 2025 General Appropriations Act, which opponents denounce as one of the most flawed and corrupt spending measures ever approved.

At a House of Representatives corruption probe on September 8, 2025, contractor Curlee Discaya implicated Romualdez in alleged kickbacks from public works contracts. On September 17, Romualdez formally resigned as speaker, a move Deputy Speaker Jay Khonghun described as one that aimed to allow Romualdez to better clarify his role in the allegations made against him. Leading up to Romualdez's resignation, media outlets reported that Bojie Dy was a leading candidate to replace the former as speaker. Dy was eventually elected as House Speaker on the same day, garnering 253 votes.

During a Senate Blue Ribbon Committee hearing on September 25, 2025, Orly Guteza testified that he regularly delivered luggage filled with cash to Romualdez's residence while working as a security aide to Zaldy Co. The amount allegedly delivered to Romualdez was an estimated ₱1.68 billion.

On September 30, the Department of Justice (DOJ) said that it was investigating Romualdez in connection with the flood control corruption scandal. The DOJ issued an immigration lookout order on October 8 against Romualdez and senators Francis Escudero, Joel Villanueva, Jinggoy Estrada, upon the request of the Independent Commission for Infrastructure.

On December 18, Department of Public Works and Highways recommended the filing of charges for plunder, malversation, graft and bribery against Romualdez and 86 other people. The Independent Commission for Infrastructure also recommended the filing of plunder, graft, and bribery charges against Romualdez and Zaldy Co before the Office of the Ombudsman.

In December 2025, Alyansa Tigil Mina and other environmental groups pushed for the passage of an anti-dynasty law, pointing out alleged links between political dynasties and mining companies. A report by Alyansa Tigil Mina and Global Witness pointed out links between Romualdez and Marcventures Mining and Development Corporation, Benguet Corporation, and Brightgreen Resources Corporation. "When politicians are beneficial owners or when politicians are part of the value chain of mining operations, we cannot expect compliance with environmental laws and other regulatory policies", said Alyansa Tigil Mina.

In July 2026, the Office of the Ombudsman said that it was filing plunder charges against Romualdez, whom the office identified as a "central figure" in the flood control corruption scandal. On September 7, 2026, Romualdez was arrested while seeking medical treatment at the Cardinal Santos Medical Center in San Juan, Metro Manila on charges of plunder relating to the flood control scandal. He was later transferred to the Philippine General Hospital in Manila on September 12 for an independent medical examination, and was then sent to detention at the Quezon City Jail Male Dormitory after a Sandiganbayan order based on findings that he was stable.

On November 10, 2026, Romualdez was ordered suspended as congressman by the Sandiganbayan as a preventative measure.

== Other ventures ==
Romualdez is the owner of the newspaper companies Manila Standard and Journal Group of Publications and the mass media firm Philippine Collective Media Corporation.

== Personal life ==
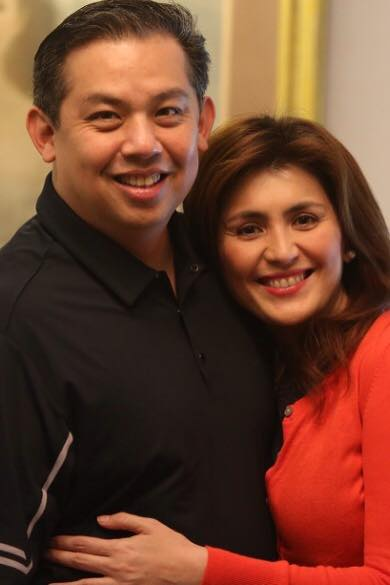
Romualdez with his wife Yedda in 2011

Romualdez married Yedda Marie Kittilstvedt, who represented the Philippines at Miss International 1996, in civil rites in Hong Kong in November 1999, with a church wedding following at Santuario de San Antonio in Forbes Park, Makati, on February 4, 2001. They have four children and currently live in Tacloban and Makati. Their sons Ferdinand Martin Romualdez Jr., also known as Marty, and Andrew Julian Romualdez are also in politics, having been elected as a councilor of Tacloban and a representative of Tingog Party List in 2025, respectively.

In 2026, Romualdez was arrested on charges of plunder. This action was related to alleged malfeasance while in public office.

== Electoral history ==
Electoral history of Martin Romualdez
Year	Office	Party	Votes received				Result
Year	Office	Party	Total	%	P.	Swing	Result
2007	Representative (Leyte–1st)	KAMPI	121,201	—N/a	1st	—N/a	Won
2010	Representative (Leyte–1st)	Lakas	99,807	60.05%	1st	—N/a	Won
2013	Representative (Leyte–1st)	Lakas	122,022	56.05%	1st	—N/a	Unopposed
2019	Representative (Leyte–1st)	Lakas	160,401	—N/a	1st	—N/a	Won
2022	Representative (Leyte–1st)	Lakas	181,415	100.00%	1st	—N/a	Unopposed
2025	Representative (Leyte–1st)	Lakas	177,486	100.00%	1st	—N/a	Unopposed
2016	Senator of the Philippines	Lakas	12,325,824	27.40%	15th	—N/a	Lost

House of Representatives of the Philippines
Preceded by Remedios Petilla	Member of the House of Representatives from Leyte; 2007–2016	Succeeded by Yedda Marie Romualdez
Preceded by Yedda Romualdez	Member of the House of Representatives from Leyte; 2019–present	Incumbent
Preceded by Fredenil Castro	House Majority Leader; 2019–2022	Succeeded by Manuel Jose Dalipe
Preceded by Lord Allan Velasco	Speaker of the House of Representatives of the Philippines; 2022–2025	Succeeded by Faustino Dy III
