= Palawan's at-large congressional district =

Legislative district of the Philippines

Palawan's at-large congressional district refers to the lone congressional district of the Philippines in the province of Palawan, formerly Paragua, for various national legislatures before 1987. The province elected its representatives province-wide at-large from its reorganization under Article 6 of the Decreto de 18 junio de 1898 y las instrucciones sobre el régimen de las provincias y pueblos for the Malolos Congress in 1898 until the creation of a first and second district on February 2, 1987. It was a single-member district throughout the ten legislatures of the Insular Government of the Philippine Islands from 1907 to 1935, the three legislatures of the Philippine Commonwealth from 1935 to 1946, the seven congresses of the Third Philippine Republic from 1946 to 1972, and the national parliament of the Fourth Philippine Republic from 1984 to 1986.

Palawan has had two instances in its history where more than one member represented it in the national legislatures. The province, still separate from Calamianes and Balabac, sent two representatives to the National Assembly (Malolos Congress) of the First Philippine Republic from 1898 to 1901 and two representatives to the National Assembly of the Second Philippine Republic from 1943 to 1944.

After 1986, all representatives were elected from its congressional districts.

== Representation history ==
#	Term of office		National Assembly	Seat A				Seat B			
#	Start	End	National Assembly	Image	Member	Party	Electoral history	Image	Member	Party	Electoral history
=== Paragua's at-large district for the Malolos Congress ===
District created June 18, 1898.
–	September 15, 1898	March 23, 1901	1st		Felipe Calderón	Nonpartisan	Appointed.		Domingo Colmenar	Nonpartisan	Appointed.
#	Term of office		Legislature	Single seat				Seats eliminated			
#	Start	End	Legislature	Image	Member	Party	Electoral history	Seats eliminated			
=== Palawan's at-large district for the Philippine Assembly ===								Seats eliminated			
District re-created January 9, 1907.								Seats eliminated			
1	October 16, 1907	October 16, 1909	1st		Santiago M. Patero	Independent	Elected in 1907.	Seats eliminated			
2	October 16, 1909	October 16, 1916	2nd		Manuel M. Sandoval	Nacionalista	Elected in 1909.	Seats eliminated			
2	October 16, 1909	October 16, 1916	3rd		Manuel M. Sandoval	Nacionalista	Re-elected in 1912.	Seats eliminated			
#	Term of office		Legislature	Single seat				Seats eliminated			
#	Start	End	Legislature	Image	Member	Party	Electoral history	Seats eliminated			
=== Palawan's at-large district for the House of Representatives of the Philippine Islands ===								Seats eliminated			
(2)	October 16, 1916	June 3, 1919	4th		Manuel M. Sandoval	Nacionalista	Re-elected in 1916.	Seats eliminated			
3	June 3, 1919	June 6, 1922	5th		Román de Jesús	Nacionalista	Elected in 1919.	Seats eliminated			
4	June 6, 1922	June 2, 1931	6th		Patricio Fernández	Nacionalista; Colectivista	Elected in 1922.	Seats eliminated			
4	June 6, 1922	June 2, 1931	7th		Patricio Fernández	Nacionalista; Consolidado	Re-elected in 1925.	Seats eliminated			
4	June 6, 1922	June 2, 1931	8th		Patricio Fernández	Nacionalista; Consolidado	Re-elected in 1928.	Seats eliminated			
5	June 2, 1931	September 16, 1935	9th		Claudio R. Sandoval	Nacionalista; Consolidado	Elected in 1931.	Seats eliminated			
5	June 2, 1931	September 16, 1935	10th		Claudio R. Sandoval	Nacionalista; Democrático	Re-elected in 1934.	Seats eliminated			
#	Term of office		National Assembly	Single seat				Seats eliminated			
#	Start	End	National Assembly	Image	Member	Party	Electoral history	Seats eliminated			
=== Palawan's at-large district for the National Assembly (Commonwealth of the Philippines) ===								Seats eliminated			
(5)	September 16, 1935	December 30, 1941	1st		Claudio R. Sandoval	Nacionalista; Democrático	Re-elected in 1935.	Seats eliminated			
(5)	September 16, 1935	December 30, 1941	2nd		Claudio R. Sandoval	Nacionalista	Re-elected in 1938.	Seats eliminated			
#	Term of office		National Assembly	Seat A				Seat B			
#	Start	End	National Assembly	Image	Member	Party	Electoral history	Image	Member	Party	Electoral history
=== Palawan's at-large district for the National Assembly (Second Philippine Republic) ===
District re-created September 7, 1943.
–	September 25, 1943	February 2, 1944	1st		Íñigo R. Peña	KALIBAPI	Elected in 1943.		Patricio Fernández	KALIBAPI	Appointed as an ex officio member.
#	Term of office		Common wealth Congress	Single seat				Seats eliminated			
#	Start	End	Common wealth Congress	Image	Member	Party	Electoral history	Seats eliminated			
=== Palawan's at-large district for the House of Representatives of the Commonwealth of the Philippines ===								Seats eliminated			
District re-created May 24, 1945.								Seats eliminated			
6	June 11, 1945	May 25, 1946	1st		Sofronio T. Española	Nacionalista	Elected in 1941.	Seats eliminated			
#	Term of office		Congress	Single seat				Seats eliminated			
#	Start	End	Congress	Image	Member	Party	Electoral history	Seats eliminated			
=== Palawan's at-large district for the House of Representatives of the Philippines ===								Seats eliminated			
(6)	May 25, 1946	December 30, 1949	1st		Sofronio T. Española	Liberal	Re-elected in 1946.	Seats eliminated			
7	December 30, 1949	March 6, 1953	2nd		Gaudencio E. Abordo	Nacionalista	Elected in 1949. Election annulled by House electoral tribunal after an electoral protest.	Seats eliminated			
(6)	March 6, 1953	December 30, 1953	2nd		Sofronio T. Española	Liberal	Declared winner of 1949 elections.	Seats eliminated			
(7)	December 30, 1953	December 30, 1965	3rd		Gaudencio E. Abordo	Nacionalista	Elected in 1953.	Seats eliminated			
(7)	December 30, 1953	December 30, 1965	4th		Gaudencio E. Abordo	Nacionalista	Re-elected in 1957.	Seats eliminated			
(7)	December 30, 1953	December 30, 1965	5th		Gaudencio E. Abordo	Nacionalista	Re-elected in 1961.	Seats eliminated			
8	December 30, 1965	December 30, 1971	6th		Ramón Mitra Jr.	Liberal	Elected in 1965.	Seats eliminated			
8	December 30, 1965	December 30, 1971	7th		Ramón Mitra Jr.	Liberal	Re-elected in 1969. Resigned on election as senator.	Seats eliminated			
District dissolved into the twenty-seat Region IV-A's at-large district for the Interim Batasang Pambansa.								Seats eliminated			
#	Term of office		Batasang Pambansa	Single seat				Seats eliminated			
#	Start	End	Batasang Pambansa	Image	Member	Party	Electoral history	Seats eliminated			
=== Palawan's at-large district for the Regular Batasang Pambansa ===								Seats eliminated			
District re-created February 1, 1984.								Seats eliminated			
–	July 23, 1984	March 25, 1986	2nd		Ramón Mitra Jr.	PDP–Laban	Elected in 1984.	Seats eliminated			
District dissolved into Palawan's 1st and 2nd districts.								Seats eliminated			

== See also ==
- Legislative districts of Palawan
