= Nicanor Yñiguez =

Filipino lawyer and politician (1915–2007)

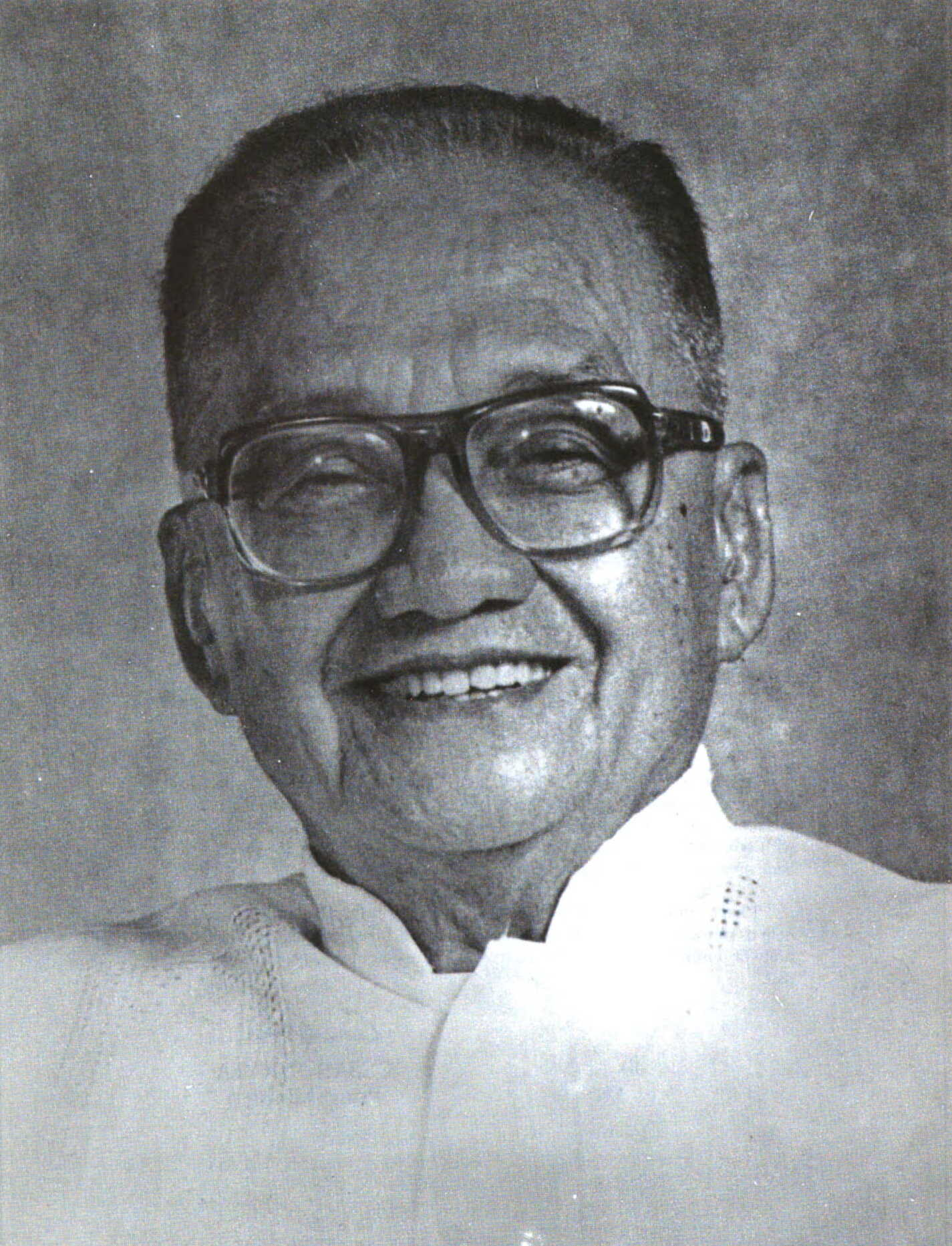
- Yñiguez in 1984

Speaker of the Batasang Pambansa
- In office July 23, 1984 – March 25, 1986
- Preceded by: Querube Makalintal
- Succeeded by: Ramon Mitra Jr. (as speaker of the House of Representatives)

Member of the Batasang Pambansa from Southern Leyte
- In office June 30, 1984 – March 25, 1986

Member of the Philippine House of Representatives
- In office December 30, 1961 – January 17, 1973
- Preceded by: District established
- Succeeded by: Roger Mercado
- Constituency: Southern Leyte's at-large district
- In office December 30, 1957 – December 30, 1961
- Preceded by: Francisco Pajao
- Succeeded by: Marcelino Veloso
- Constituency: Leyte's 3rd district

Personal details
- Born: November 6, 1915 Maasin, Leyte, Philippine Islands
- Died: April 13, 2007 (aged 91) Maasin, Southern Leyte, Philippines
- Party: KBL (1978–2007)
- Other political affiliations: Nacionalista (1957–1978)
- Spouse: Salvacion Oppus Yñiguez
- Children: 3
- Education: Silliman University (AA); University of the Philippines Diliman (LL.B)
- Occupation: Politician
- Profession: Lawyer

Nicanor Espina Yñiguez (November 6, 1915 – April 13, 2007) was a Filipino lawyer and politician and speaker of the Regular Batasang Pambansa from 1984 to 1986. Considered the "Father of Southern Leyte", he authored the law that created the province of Southern Leyte.

== Early life and education ==
Yñiguez finished his Associate in Arts degree from Silliman University in 1935. Later, he graduated from the University of the Philippines, where he joined the Upsilon Sigma Phi fraternity with Ferdinand Marcos and Jolly Bugarin in 1937.

== Political career ==
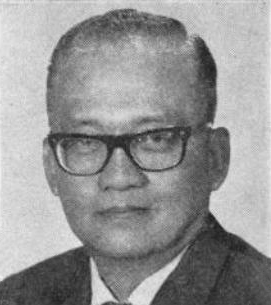
Yñiguez in 1967

Yñiguez was first elected to the House of Representatives on December 30, 1957, as representative of Leyte's third district. During his first term, he filed a bill creating the province of Southern Leyte. This bill became Republic Act No. 2227 and was signed into law by President Carlos P. Garcia in 1959. In 1961, he became the first representative of Southern Leyte's at-large district.

He became an assemblyman from 1984 to 1986, where he served as Speaker of the Batasang Pambansa. In 1986, he was acting president of Kilusang Bagong Lipunan.

After the 1986 People Power Revolution, Yñiguez did not flee from the Philippines. In fact, he was the only Marcos crony who had not a case filed against him in the Sandiganbayan.

== Death ==
He died on April 13, 2007. He was married for 66 years to Salvacion Oppus Yñiguez, who died in September 2004. Their eldest child, Gabriel, died young. They are survived by their children Rosette and Alfredo, and several grandchildren and great-grandchildren.

== Electoral history ==
Electoral history of Nicanor Yñiguez
Year	Office	Party	Votes received				Result
Year	Office	Party	Total	%	P.	Swing	Result
1957	Representative (Leyte–3rd)	Nacionalista	—N/a	—N/a	1st	—N/a	Won
1961	Representative (Southern Leyte)	Nacionalista	—N/a	—N/a	1st	—N/a	Won
1965	Representative (Southern Leyte)	Nacionalista	31,238	55.24%	1st	—N/a	Won
1969	Representative (Southern Leyte)	Nacionalista	—N/a	—N/a	1st	—N/a	Won
1978	Assemblyman (Region IV)	KBL	373,034	7.43%	8th	—N/a	Won
1984	Assemblyman (Southern Leyte)	KBL	—N/a	—N/a	—N/a	—N/a	Won
1987	Senator of the Philippines	KBL	1,429,910	6.29%	53rd	—N/a	Lost

House of Representatives of the Philippines
Preceded by Querube Makalintal	Speaker of the Batasang Pambansa; July 23, 1984 – March 25, 1986	Succeeded by Ramon Mitra Jr. (as speaker of the House of Representatives)
New district	Member of the Batasang Pambansa from Southern Leyte; June 30, 1984 – March 25, 1986	District abolished
New district	Member of the Philippine House of Representatives for Southern Leyte's at-large district December 30, 1961 – January 17, 1973	District abolished (seat later held by Roger Mercado in 1987)
Preceded by Francisco Pajao	Member of the Philippine House of Representatives for Leyte's 3rd district December 30, 1957 – December 30, 1961	Succeeded by Marcelino Veloso
