= 1922 Speaker of the Philippine House of Representatives election =

7th speakership election in the Philippine House of Representatives

- October 16–26, 1922

Needed to win: Majority of votes cast First ballot: 93 votes cast, 47 needed for a majority Thirteenth ballot: 93 votes cast, 47 needed for a majority
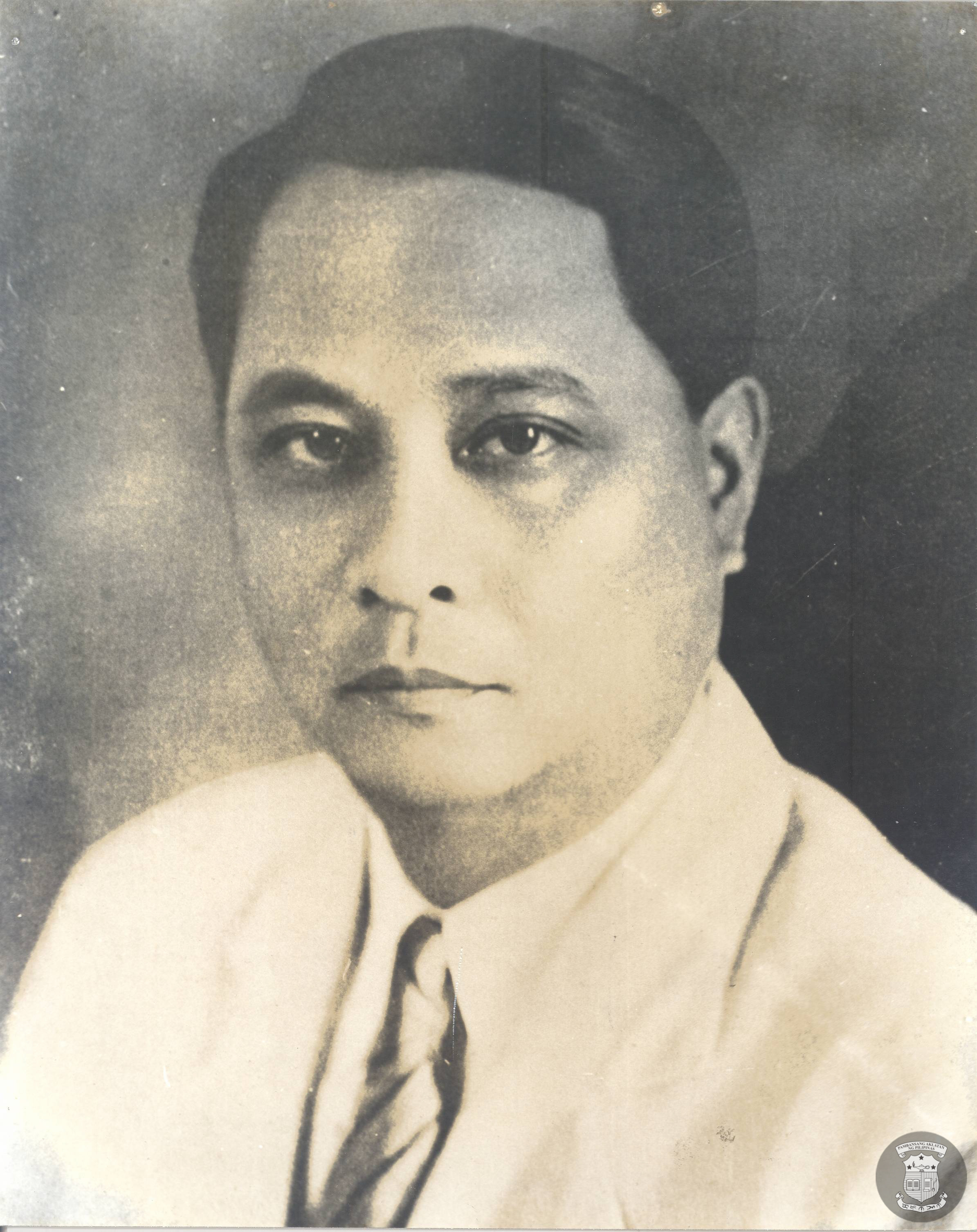

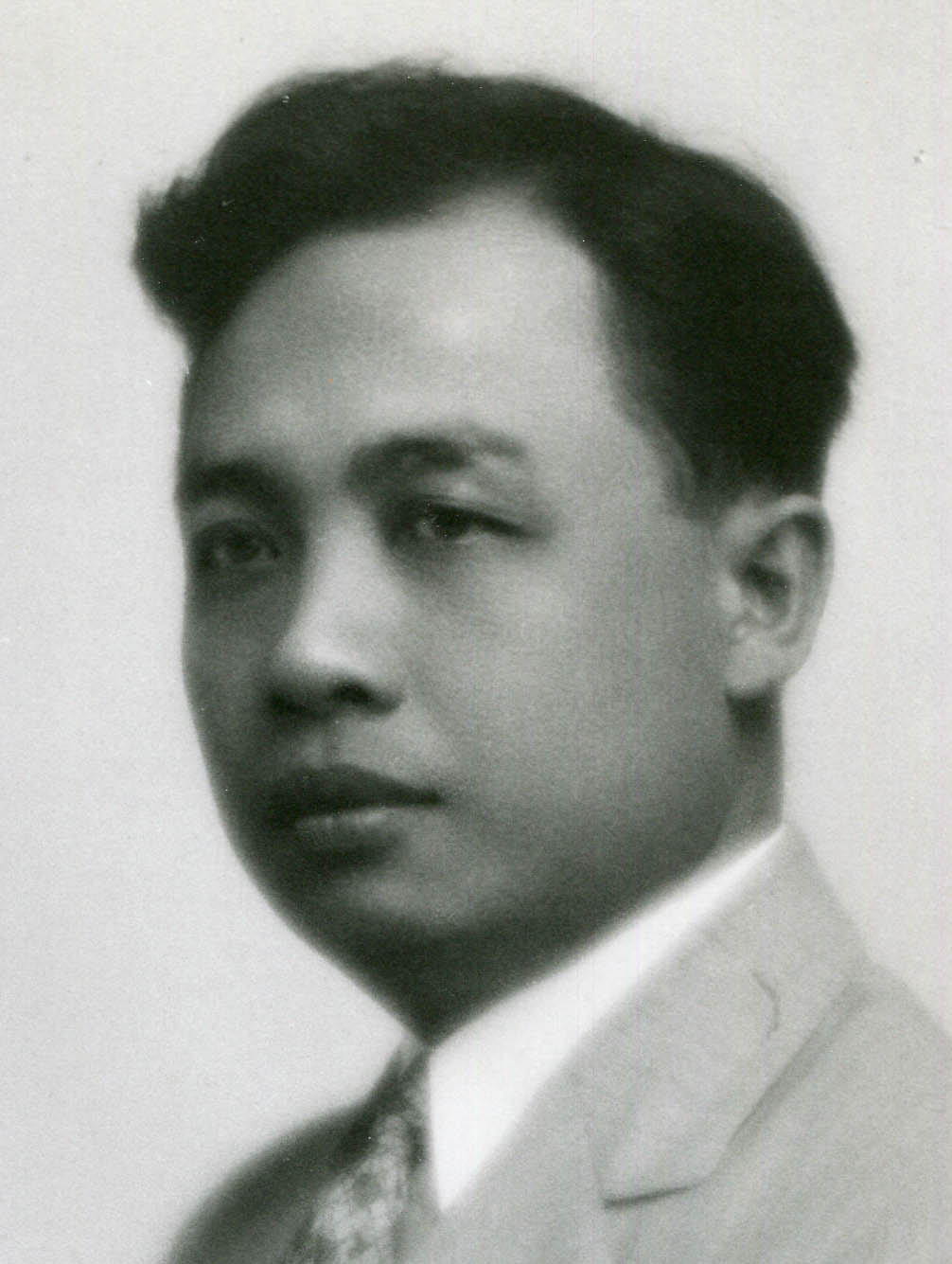

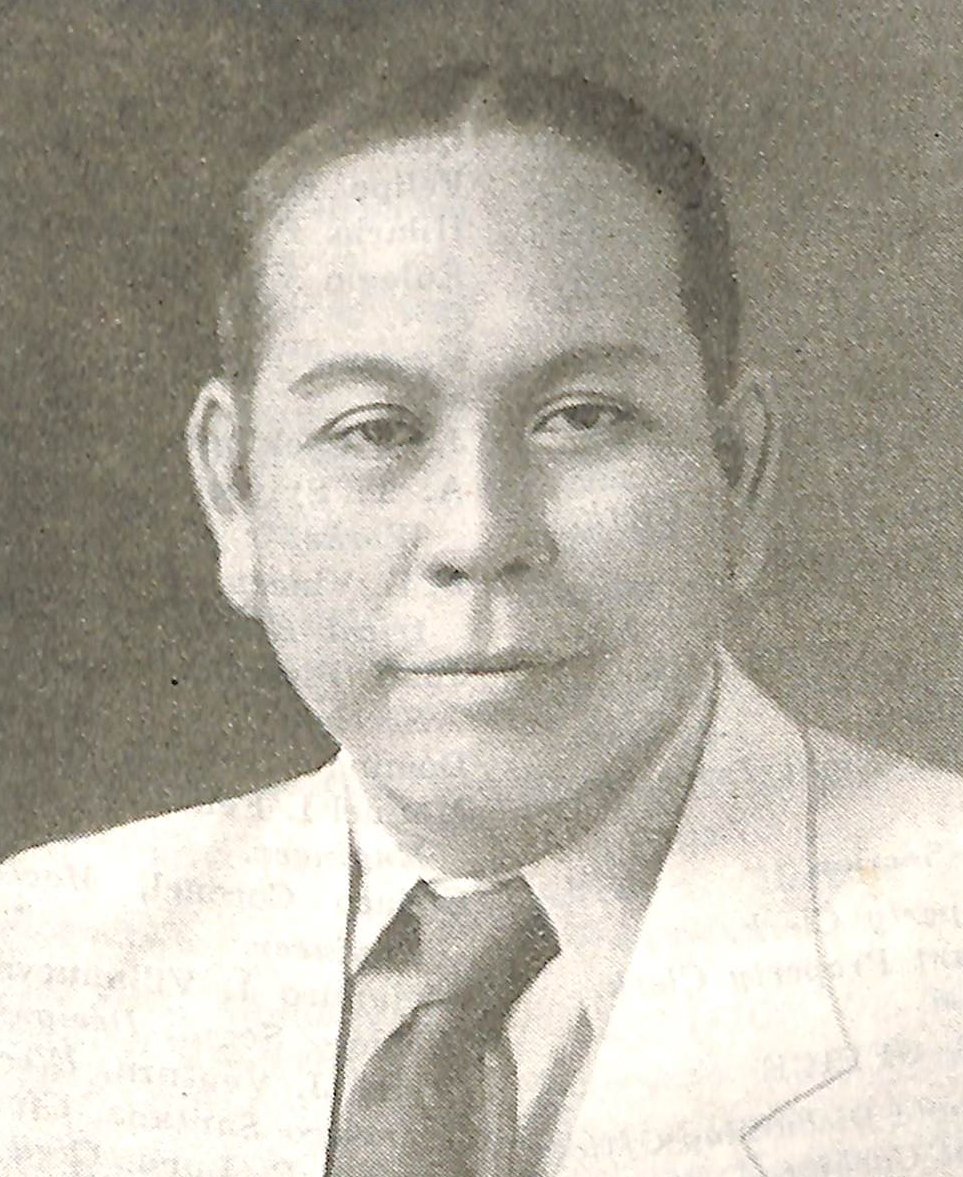

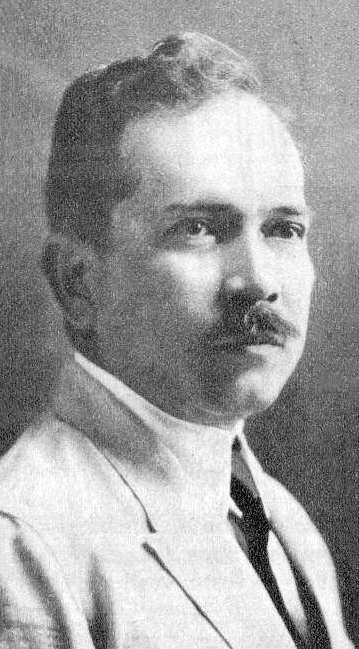
	Majority party	Minority party	Third party
Candidate	Manuel Roxas	Claro M. Recto	Mariano Cuenco
Party	Nacionalista Colectivista	Democrata	Nacionalista Unipersonalista
Leader's seat	Capiz–1st	Batangas–3rd	Cebu–5th
First ballot	33 (35.5%)	25 (26.9%)	20 (21.5%)
Final ballot	49 (52.7%)	Did not contest	Did not contest
	Fourth party
Candidate	Anselmo Bernad	Others
Party	Independent
Leader's seat	Misamis–2nd
First ballot	3 (3.2%)	5 (5.4%)
Final ballot	3 (3.2%)	1 (1.1%)
Speaker before election
Sergio Osmeña
Nacionalista
Elected Speaker
Manuel Roxas
Nacionalista Colectivista

At the opening of the 6th Philippine Legislature, the members of the House of Representatives elected in 1922 held an election for its speaker. It was the 7th and longest-recorded election for the speakership in the chamber's history. The election began on October 16, 1922, and concluded on October 26, when Manuel Roxas, leader of the Colectivista faction of the Nacionalista Party, won a majority of the votes cast on the thirteenth ballot. Other nominees in the first round of ballots were Claro M. Recto of the Democrata Party and Mariano Cuenco of the Unipersonalista faction of the Nacionalista Party.

== Background ==
Leading to the 1922 elections, the split between Manuel L. Quezon and Sergio Osmeña stemmed from disagreements over leadership within the Nacionalista Party, particularly Osmeña's influence over government affairs and executive appointments. Quezon advocated collective leadership and greater independence for the Senate, opposing Osmeña's dominance over the party and the government. After several unsuccessful attempts at reconciliation, Quezon and his supporters formally established the Partido Nacionalista Colectivista on February 17, 1922. At its inauguration, Quezon declared, "My loyalty to my party ends where my loyalty to my country begins," formalizing the division of the Nacionalista Party into rival factions.

The division carried into the election for speaker of the House of Representatives at the opening of the 6th Philippine Legislature on October 16, 1922, where Manuel Roxas, leader of the Colectivista faction, contested the speakership amid a prolonged deadlock. After thirteen ballots over eleven days, Roxas secured a majority of votes cast and was elected speaker on October 26, 1922.

== Election of the speaker ==
=== Candidates ===
==== Main party nominations ====
Jose Avelino, representative for Samar of the Democrata Party, nominated Claro M. Recto for speaker. The Nacionalista Colectivista faction, through Batangas representative Antonio de las Alas, nominated Manuel Roxas of Capiz, while the Nacionalista Unipersonalista faction, through Tarlac representative Benigno Aquino Sr., nominated Mariano Cuenco of Cebu. Anselmo Bernad, an independent representative from Misamis, was also nominated by Democrata representative Jose Maria Veloso.

==== Other candidates ====
The following other individuals received at least one vote in the election for speaker.

- Benigno Aquino Sr. (Tarlac–2nd, Nacionalista Unipersonalista)
- Anselmo Bernad (Misamis–2nd, Independent)
- Antonio de las Alas (Batangas–1st, Nacionalista Colectivista)
- Cresenciano Lozano (Iloilo–2nd, Nacionalista Unipersonalista)
- Mariano Melendres (Rizal–2nd, Democrata)

=== Summary of votes ===
Nacionalista Colectivista nominee
Democrata nominee
Nacionalista Unipersonalista nominee

Speaker ballot
Date	October 16		October 17			October 19	October 23		October 25				October 26
Ballot	1st	2nd	3rd	4th	5th	6th	7th	8th	9th	10th	11th	12th	13th
Benigno Aquino Sr.	1												
Jose Avelino												Declined	
Anselmo Bernad	3												3
Mariano Cuenco	20		19	20				19	17		15	34	
Antonio de las Alas	1												
Cresenciano Lozano						1							
Mariano Melendres	1												
Claro M. Recto	25	27	28			27	28	27				Withdrawn	Declined
Manuel Roxas	33					32	33					34	49
Votes needed	47												
Total votes	93					92	93						
Abstention	5	7	6				7	8	9			16	31
Absent	4	3	4	3			2	3	4		6	7	9
