= Lakas ng Bansa =

Defunct political party in the Philippines

- Founder: Ramon Mitra Jr.
- Founded: 1986
- Dissolved: 1988
- Merged into: LDP
- Ideology: Conservative liberalism Economic liberalism
- Political position: Center-right
- National affiliation: Laban (1987); PDP–Lakas Coalition (1988)
- Colors: Blue, dark blue, and Yellow

The Lakas ng Bansa (Lakas; lit. 'Power of Nation') was a defunct conservative liberal political party in the Philippines established in 1986, and folded until 1988 when merged with the Cojuangco faction of PDP–Laban to form Laban ng Demokratikong Pilipino (LDP).

== History ==
In 1986, after the snap elections which made Corazon Aquino swept in power, House Speaker Ramon Mitra and some members of United Nationalist Democratic Organization (UNIDO) created a pro-Aquino party which supports the president, regardless of previous party affiliation.

In 1988, Mitra, Congressman Peping Cojuangco, and presidential sister-in-law Paul Aquino (father of Bam Aquino) agreed to merge Lakas ng Bansa and PDP–Laban (Cojuangco faction) to form Laban ng Demokratikong Pilipino (LDP). The Cojuangco faction was formed in 1988 due to Cojuangco's recruitment of former Pro-Marcos and Kilusang Bagong Lipunan (KBL) politicians to the PDP–Laban.

== Electoral performance ==
House elections	House seats won	Result	Senate elections	Senate seats won	Ticket	Result
1987 (Note: Seat total consists of 24 Lakas ng Bansa representatives and 21 dual representatives of Lakas ng Bansa and PDP–Laban.)	45 / 200	Lakas ng Bansa / PDP–Laban plurality	1987 (Note: Participated as Bansang Nagkakaisa sa Diwa at Layunin (BANDILA).)	1 / 24	LABAN	LABAN win 22/24 seats
