= Ramon Mitra Jr. =

Speaker of the House of Representatives of the Philippines from 1987 to 1992

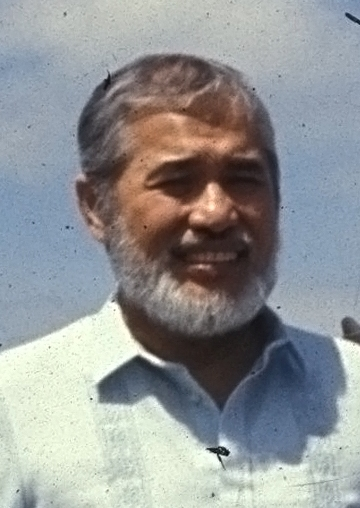
- Mitra in 1986

16th Speaker of the Philippine House of Representatives
- In office July 27, 1987 – June 30, 1992
- Preceded by: Nicanor Yñiguez (as speaker of the Batasang Pambansa)
- Succeeded by: Jose de Venecia Jr.

House Minority Leader
- In office June 12, 1971 – January 24, 1972
- Preceded by: Justiniano Montano
- Succeeded by: Ramon Felipe Jr.

Minister/Secretary of Agriculture
- In office March 25, 1986 – March 9, 1987
- President: Corazon Aquino
- Preceded by: Salvador Escudero
- Succeeded by: Carlos Dominguez III

Member of the Batasang Pambansa from Palawan
- In office June 30, 1984 – March 25, 1986

Member of the House of Representatives from Palawan
- In office June 30, 1987 – June 30, 1992
- Preceded by: District established
- Succeeded by: Alfredo Abueg Jr.
- Constituency: 2nd district
- In office December 30, 1965 – December 30, 1971
- Preceded by: Gaudencio Abordo
- Succeeded by: District abolished
- Constituency: At-large district

Senator of the Philippines
- In office December 30, 1971 – January 17, 1973

Personal details
- Born: Ramon Villarosa Mitra Jr. February 4, 1928 Puerto Princesa, Palawan, Philippine Islands
- Died: March 20, 2000 (aged 72) Makati, Philippines
- Party: LDP (1988–2000)
- Other political affiliations: LnB (1987–1988); PDP–Laban (1983–1987); Laban (1978–1983); Liberal (1965-1978)
- Spouse: Cecilia Aldeguer Blanco (m. 1959)
- Children: 7, including Ramon III, Abraham and Raul
- Parent: Ramon P. Mitra (father)
- Education: San Beda College (LL.B)
- Occupation: Politician
- Profession: Lawyer

Ramon Villarosa Mitra Jr. (February 4, 1928 – March 20, 2000) was a Filipino statesman, diplomat, and pro-democracy activist. He served as speaker of the House of Representatives of the Philippines from 1987 to 1992. Prior to that, he was Corazon Aquino's first minister of Agriculture from 1986 to 1987, a member of the Batasang Pambansa from 1984 to 1986, and a senator during the 7th Congress.

== Early life and career ==
Mitra was born on February 4, 1928, inside the Iwahig Penal Colony in Puerto Princesa, Palawan to Ramon P. Mitra and Purification Villarosa. At the time of his birth, his father was the superintendent of the penal colony. He attended public school for elementary education and took his secondary education in San Beda College. He finished his degree in liberal arts in Baguio and obtained his Bachelor of Laws in San Beda College.

Mitra was a foreign service officer in Washington, D.C., and at the United Nations from 1954 to 1961. In 1961, he was special assistant to the Office of the President. He then became a senior technical assistant to the Manila mayor's office from 1962 to 1965.

== Political life ==
Mitra's official portrait during the 6th Congress

=== Representative (1965–1971) ===
Mitra's political career began when he ran and won a seat in the House of Representatives representing Palawan's at-large congressional district during the 1965 general election. He ran again for a second term in 1969 and won again, but resigned before completing his term to run for the Senate in 1971. During his first stint in the House, he was the minority leader for one year.

=== Senator of the Philippines (1971–1972) ===
Mitra was one of the eight candidates fielded by the Liberal Party for the 1971 Senate election. In August 1971, during a campaign rally held in Plaza Miranda to proclaim their candidacies, a deadly bombing occurred which caused 9 deaths and injured 95, including Mitra. He acquired 32 shrapnel wounds and 13 shrapnel buried in his body.

He won sixth place in the election with around 3 million votes. In September 1972, his term was cut short by martial law and was subsequently arrested. He was one of the first arrested and jailed when Ferdinand Marcos declared martial law.

=== Assemblyman (1984–1986) ===
In 1978, Mitra unsuccessfully ran for the Interim Batasang Pambansa together with former Senator Ninoy Aquino. In 1984, he was elected as an assemblyman to the Regular Batasang Pambansa. After the People Power Revolution in 1986, Mitra joined the Aquino administration and was appointed as Agriculture Minister.

=== Speaker of the House (1987–1992) ===
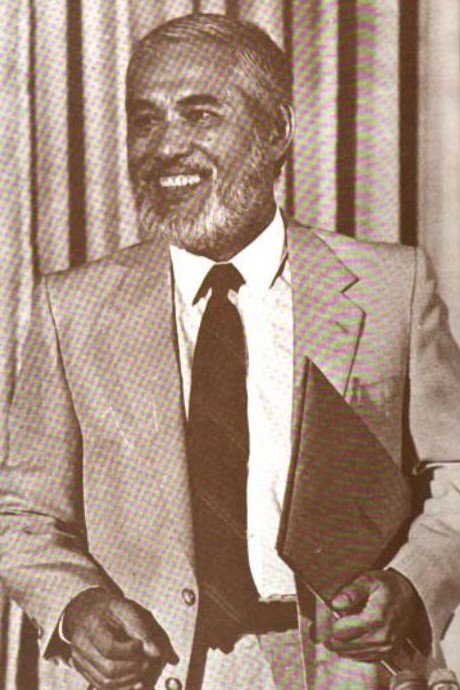
Mitra's official portrait during the 8th Congress.

After the restoration of the House of Representatives, he ran for the second district of Palawan. He was eventually elected as Speaker of the House at its inaugural session. During his sterling leadership of the House, major bills were passed into laws of the country and instituted policies, aimed at enhancing the functions of the House as a legislative institution.

=== 1992 presidential campaign ===
In 1991, Mitra, who was also the party president of the LDP, was selected at a party convention as the candidate for President of the Philippines, defeating Defense Secretary Fidel V. Ramos for the nomination. Ramos left the LDP and formed his own party, the Lakas ng Tao. Mitra's bid was difficult because he was branded as a "traditional politician" and suffered many controversies, including the alleged use of the congressional printing press for his election materials. Mitra ultimately lost the 1992 presidential election to Ramos.

A television film based on Mitra's life was planned to be directed by Lupita Kashiwahara, written by Baby Nebrida, and star Cesar Montano.

=== Later career ===
In 1995, he agreed to create a coalition with Ramos and formed the Lakas-Laban Coalition. In the 1995 Philippine general election, he ran for senator but lost. In the 1998 general election, he returned to the political spotlight as a key supporter of Joseph Estrada's successful presidential campaign. Estrada rewarded Mitra by naming him president of the state-owned Philippine National Oil Corporation.

== Personal life ==
Popularly known as "Monching", he married Cecilia Aldeguer Blanco in April 1959 and had six sons. The third son, Ramon III, graduated from the Philippine Military Academy in 1988 and served in the Philippine Marine Corps before running for senator in the 2010 elections. The fourth son, Bernardo, has been working for government in various capacities since 1989. The youngest son, Abraham Kahlil, was the governor of Palawan from 2010 to 2013. He had an illegitimate son, Raul, who is a composer and songwriter. His granddaughter, Monica Ann Mitra, is currently serving as chief political officer for politician Alan Peter Cayetano.

During a night rally of farmers and fishermen in the midst of the 1992 presidential elections, he told his story about his poor life:

All candidates say they're going to do something about poverty, I don't doubt the sincerity of their words. But do they really know how it is to be poor? Do they really know how it is to be hungry, really hungry? I do. Do they know how to throw a fishing net, how to fish from a boat through the long night? I do. The farmer who follows the carabao, what he thinks and what he feels, is something I know very well.

With that, Mitra confessed he was born out of wedlock, reared barefoot and hungry, who caught crocodiles as a youth and was shunned by his affluent father.

He had a lifelong involvement with cattle. He was chairman of the Farm Management Enterprises Corporation which owned and operated farm cattle ranches and was a breeder of gamecocks, thoroughbred horses, and cattle. When he conceded defeat in the 1992 presidential race, he found solace within the fences of his ranch and after which, continued to live his life as a farmer.

Mitra died at the Makati Medical Center from liver cancer on March 20, 2000, at the age of 72. One of his last requests was to be buried beside a lighthouse in Palawan with simple funeral rites. In one of his last interviews, he said "the lighthouse overlooks the ocean where all boats entering and leaving Puerto Princesa Bay pass by. By making that my final resting place, I can continuously guide and protect my people."

A building was named after him serving as the West Wing in the Batasang Pambansa Complex in Quezon City.

== Electoral history ==
Electoral history of Ramon Mitra Jr.
Year	Office	Party	Votes received				Result
Year	Office	Party	Total	%	P.	Swing	Result
1965	Representative (Palawan)	Liberal	21,052	53.80%	1st	—N/a	Won
1971	Senator of the Philippines	Liberal	3,916,833	41.58%	6th	—N/a	Won
1995	Senator of the Philippines	LDP	8,650,618	33.61%	13th	-7.97	Lost
1978	Assemblyman (Region IV)	LABAN	1,179,529	2.13%	24th	—N/a	Lost
1984	Assemblyman (Palawan)	PDP–Laban	79,236	58.12%	1st	—N/a	Won
1987	Representative (Palawan–2nd)	LnB	—N/a	—N/a	1st	—N/a	Won
1992	President of the Philippines	LDP	3,316,661	14.64%	4th	—N/a	Lost

House of Representatives of the Philippines
Preceded by Nicanor Yñiguez (as speaker of the Batasang Pambansa)	Speaker of the House of Representatives of the Philippines; July 27, 1987 – June 30, 1992	Succeeded by Jose de Venecia Jr.
Preceded by Justiniano Montano	House Minority Leader; June 12, 1971 – January 24, 1972	Succeeded by Ramon Felipe Jr.
New district	Member of the Philippine House of Representatives for Palawan's 2nd district June 30, 1987 – June 30, 1992	Succeeded by Alfredo Abueg Jr.
New district	Member of the Batasang Pambansa from Palawan; June 30, 1984 – March 25, 1986	District abolished
Preceded by Gaudencio Abordo	Member of the Philippine House of Representatives for Palawan's at-large district December 30, 1965 – December 30, 1971	District abolished
Government offices
Preceded by Salvador Escudero III	Minister and Secretary of Agriculture; March 25, 1986 – March 9, 1987	Succeeded by Carlos Dominguez III
Party political offices
First	LDP nominee for President of the Philippines; 1992	Vacant Supported Joseph Estrada (LAMMP) Title next held by Panfilo Lacson
