= 1987 Philippine legislative election =

10th Philippine general elections

1987 Philippine general election
- May 11, 1987
- Senate election
- May 11, 1987

12 (of the 24) seats in the Senate 13 seats needed for a majority
Alliance	LABAN	GAD
Seats won	22	2
Popular vote	243,237,045	98,060,057
Percentage	67.71	26.16
Senate President before election
Abolished (last held by Gil Puyat)
Nacionalista
Elected Senate President
Jovito Salonga
LABAN (Liberal)
- House elections
- May 11, 1987
- 200 (of the 214) seats in the House of Representatives of the Philippines; 101 seats needed for a majority
Party	Vote %	Seats	+/–
LnB	17.48	24	+24
PDP–Laban	17.32	43	+37
UNIDO	12.80	19	−16
Liberal	10.46	16	+16
Nacionalista	7.19	4	+2
KBL	4.10	11	−99
PnB	1.63	2	+2
GAD	1.34	2	+2
LABAN	1.24	1	+1
Coalitions/others	13.19	55	+38
Independent	13.25	23	+17
This lists parties that won seats. See the complete results below.
Speaker before	Speaker after
Nicanor Yñiguez; KBL	Ramon Mitra Jr. LnB

The 1987 Philippine legislative election was the first general election in the Philippines since the People Power Revolution and the approval of the 1987 constitution. The election was for the restored bicameral Congress of the Philippines. All winners' terms are from June 30, 1987, up to June 30, 1992.

== Background ==
In the aftermath of then 1986 Philippine presidential election, incumbent Ferdinand Marcos and his running mate Arturo Tolentino were declared winners. There were widespread protests denouncing Marcos' victory, alleging massive fraud. The protests evolved into the People Power Revolution, driving Marcos into exile.

Corazon Aquino, the candidate Marcos supposedly defeated, became president. A month after taking power, she proclaimed the Freedom Constitution, abolishing the Batasang Pambansa (parliament). The Freedom Constitution contained provisions for Aquino appointing a constitutional commission that shall draft a new constitution. The constitutional commission indeed drafted a new constitution, which was approved by the voters on February 2, 1987.

== Electoral system ==
=== Senate ===
The new constitution restored the Senate and its plurality block voting system in use from 1941 to 1972. In this election, all 24 seats are up, and the winners' terms will start on June 30, 1987, and end five years later.

=== House of Representatives ===
The new constitution reverted to the House of Representatives, in use from 1935 to 1972. Unlike its original iteration, the House now adopts the additional seats reserved for sectors first applied in the Batasang Pambansa. There are now 200 districts from congressional districts, then 20% of the seats will be reserved for the party-list system; in lieu of the adoption of such a system, the constitution allows for the old sectoral representation from the Batasang Pambansa to be continued.

== Campaign ==
The pro-Aquino forces coalesced to the Lakas ng Bayan (People Power), while the anti-Aquino forces were split into the Grand Alliance for Democracy, and the Kilusang Bagong Lipunan (New Society Movement), composed mostly of pro-Marcos forces. The left ran candidates under the Partido ng Bayan (People's Party, forerunner of Makabayan) banner.

In the House elections, the constituent parties under Lakas ng Bayan split up and ran against each other on multiple districts.

== Results ==
The Lakas ng Bayan had a resounding victory, winning a majority on both chambers of Congress.

=== Senate ===
Candidate	Party	Votes	%
Jovito Salonga	Lakas ng Bayan	12,988,360	57.12
Butz Aquino	Lakas ng Bayan	12,426,432	54.65
Orly Mercado	Lakas ng Bayan	11,901,673	52.34
John Henry Osmeña	Lakas ng Bayan	11,299,102	49.69
Edgardo Angara	Lakas ng Bayan	11,288,407	49.64
Alberto Romulo	Lakas ng Bayan	11,119,193	48.90
Leticia Ramos-Shahani	Lakas ng Bayan	11,089,340	48.77
Rene Saguisag	Lakas ng Bayan	10,871,850	47.81
Neptali Gonzales	Lakas ng Bayan	10,855,796	47.74
Joey Lina	Lakas ng Bayan	10,679,150	46.96
Wigberto Tañada	Lakas ng Bayan	10,420,831	45.83
Heherson Alvarez	Lakas ng Bayan	10,288,113	45.24
Sotero Laurel	Lakas ng Bayan	10,278,729	45.20
Joseph Estrada	Grand Alliance for Democracy (Note: Guest candidate of Union for Peace and Progress–Kilusang Bagong Lipunan)	10,029,978	44.11
Teofisto Guingona Jr.	Lakas ng Bayan	9,957,591	43.79
Raul Manglapus	Lakas ng Bayan	9,910,244	43.58
Vicente Paterno	Lakas ng Bayan	9,647,680	42.43
Victor Ziga	Lakas ng Bayan	9,489,132	41.73
Ernesto Maceda	Lakas ng Bayan	9,381,682	41.26
Nene Pimentel	Lakas ng Bayan	9,042,696	39.77
Ernesto Herrera	Lakas ng Bayan	8,474,297	37.27
Mamintal A.J. Tamano	Lakas ng Bayan	8,102,231	35.63
Santanina Rasul	Lakas ng Bayan	7,966,882	35.03
Juan Ponce Enrile	Grand Alliance for Democracy	7,964,966	35.03
Augusto Sanchez	Lakas ng Bayan	7,891,932	34.71
Arthur Defensor Sr.	Lakas ng Bayan	7,865,702	34.59
Eva Estrada-Kalaw	Grand Alliance for Democracy	6,922,810	30.44
Vicente Puyat	Grand Alliance for Democracy	6,859,307	30.16
Alejandro Almendras	Grand Alliance for Democracy	6,317,107	27.78
Blas Ople	Grand Alliance for Democracy	5,736,911	25.23
Arturo Tolentino	Grand Alliance for Democracy	5,725,189	25.18
Vicente Magsaysay	Grand Alliance for Democracy	5,500,447	24.19
Ramon Revilla Sr.	Independent	5,203,982	22.88
Rene Espina	Grand Alliance for Democracy	5,107,313	22.46
Francisco Tatad	Grand Alliance for Democracy	4,743,678	20.86
Homobono Adaza	Grand Alliance for Democracy	4,657,782	20.48
Roilo Golez	Grand Alliance for Democracy	4,657,782	20.48
Rafael Recto	Union for Peace and Progress–Kilusang Bagong Lipunan	3,277,088	14.41
Romeo Jalosjos Sr.	Grand Alliance for Democracy	3,131,226	13.77
Wilson Gamboa Sr.	Grand Alliance for Democracy	2,450,523	10.78
Isidro Rodriguez	Grand Alliance for Democracy	2,326,937	10.23
Wenceslao Lagumbay	Grand Alliance for Democracy	2,168,086	9.53
Abul Khayr Alonto	Grand Alliance for Democracy	1,998,261	8.79
Rafael Palmares	Grand Alliance for Democracy	1,974,023	8.68
Lorenzo Teves	Grand Alliance for Democracy	1,790,962	7.88
Zosimo Paredes	Grand Alliance for Democracy	1,786,271	7.86
Rodolfo Fariñas	Independent	1,668,147	7.34
Fernando R. Veloso	Grand Alliance for Democracy	1,660,100	7.30
Merced Edith Nakpil-Rabat	Grand Alliance for Democracy	1,655,065	7.28
Leonardo B. Perez	Union for Peace and Progress–Kilusang Bagong Lipunan	1,559,353	6.86
Jeremias U. Montemayor	Grand Alliance for Democracy	1,522,413	6.69
Salvador Britanico	Union for Peace and Progress–Kilusang Bagong Lipunan	1,501,159	6.60
Nicanor Yñiguez	Union for Peace and Progress–Kilusang Bagong Lipunan	1,429,910	6.29
Firdausi Ismail Abbas	Grand Alliance for Democracy	1,372,920	6.04
Horacio Morales	Alliance for New Politics	1,327,920	5.84
Bernabe Buscayno	Alliance for New Politics	1,307,527	5.75
Jose Burgos Jr.	Alliance for New Politics	1,300,596	5.72
Nelia Sancho	Alliance for New Politics	1,264,375	5.56
Vicente Millora	Union for Peace and Progress–Kilusang Bagong Lipunan	1,242,115	5.46
Crispin Beltran	Alliance for New Politics	1,154,593	5.08
Jaime Tadeo	Alliance for New Politics	1,093,995	4.81
Romeo Capulong	Alliance for New Politics	1,063,818	4.68
Macabangkit Lanto	Union for Peace and Progress–Kilusang Bagong Lipunan	861,506	3.79
Pacifico Lopez de Leon	Union for Peace and Progress–Kilusang Bagong Lipunan	836,316	3.68
Antonio Raquiza	Union for Peace and Progress–Kilusang Bagong Lipunan	771,951	3.39
Norma Precy Mathay	Union for Peace and Progress–Kilusang Bagong Lipunan	743,573	3.27
Nilo Tayag	Union for Peace and Progress–Kilusang Bagong Lipunan	721,431	3.17
Concordio Diel	Union for Peace and Progress–Kilusang Bagong Lipunan	573,248	2.52
Manuel Manahan	Independent	570,979	2.51
Joaquin Venus	Union for Peace and Progress–Kilusang Bagong Lipunan	554,644	2.44
Vicente Abangan	Union for Peace and Progress–Kilusang Bagong Lipunan	549,901	2.42
Edilberto A. del Valle	Union for Peace and Progress–Kilusang Bagong Lipunan	468,522	2.06
Rommel Corro	Union for Peace and Progress–Kilusang Bagong Lipunan	459,758	2.02
Geronimo Quadra	Union for Peace and Progress–Kilusang Bagong Lipunan	402,346	1.77
Salvador Panelo	Union for Peace and Progress–Kilusang Bagong Lipunan	393,413	1.73
Oswaldo Carbonell	Independent	326,848	1.44
Antonio Velasco	Independent	261,707	1.15
Jacinto Tamayo	Lapiang Manggagawa	155,353	0.68
Juan T. David	Lakas ng Bayan (original)	101,499	0.45
Carmelito Montano	Independent	85,425	0.38
Elpidio Dizon	Independent	79,080	0.35
Bienvenido Medrano	Lapiang Manggagawa	59,653	0.26
Leopoldo Quesada	Partido Nacionalista ng Pilipinas	55,519	0.24
Manuel Pages	Independent	29,908	0.13
Franco Rimando	Independent	26,650	0.12
Glicerio Gervero	Independent	18,750	0.08
Silvino Barsana Agudo	Independent	11,250	0.05
Julian Taasan	Independent	7,501	0.03
Ramon A. Gonzales	Independent	3,750	0.02
Elly Pamatong	Independent	3,098	0.01
Liberato Roldan	Independent	2,487	0.01
Total		374,827,746	100.00
Total votes		22,739,995	–
Registered voters/turnout		26,569,539	85.59

=== House of Representatives ===
Party	Votes	%	Seats	+/–
Lakas ng Bansa	3,510,638	17.48	24	New
PDP–Laban	3,477,958	17.32	43	+49
United Nationalist Democratic Organization	2,570,876	12.80	19	−16
Liberal Party	2,101,575	10.46	16	New
Nacionalista Party	1,444,399	7.19	4	+2
Kilusang Bagong Lipunan	823,676	4.10	11	−99
Partido ng Bayan	328,215	1.63	2	New
Grand Alliance for Democracy	268,156	1.34	2	New
Lakas ng Bayan	248,489	1.24	1	New
Coalitions/others	2,648,719	13.19	55	+38
Independent	2,660,894	13.25	23	+17
Appointed seats			14	+11
Total	20,083,595	100.00	214	+14
Source: Dieter Nohlen; Florian Grotz; Christof Hartmann; Graham Hassall; Soliman M. Santos (15 November 2001). Elections in Asia and the Pacific: A Data Handbook: Volume II: South East Asia, East Asia, and the South Pacific. ISBN 978-0-19-924959-6. & Julio Teehankee. "Electoral Politics in the Philippines" (PDF). quezon.ph.

== Aftermath ==
The first local elections above the barangay level under the 1987 constitution was held in 1988. The first barangay elections under the 1987 constitution was held in 1989. The first presidential and vice presidential elections held under the 1987 constitution was held in 1992.
