= Marcos loyalism =

Supporters of Ferdinand Marcos and his family

Marcos loyalism refers to the supporters of Ferdinand Marcos, 10th president of the Philippines and his family. Members of his political base were often referred to as "Marcos Loyalists" (Filipino: Loyalista ni Marcos).

== Ideology ==
The ideology of Marcos loyalists centered on constitutional authoritarianism, a cult of personality and the narrative of romanticized belief that the martial law era as a "golden age".

== Symbols ==
=== V Sign ===
The V sign or victory symbol was associated with the Marcos family when Ferdinand Marcos Sr. used the gesture during his four presidential campaigns. His son and namesake, President Bongbong Marcos, his electoral alliance, and his supporters used the "V sign" gesture as the official identity of their political campaign during the 2022 presidential elections. In the pro-Marcos camp, the "V sign" (made by raising the index and middle fingers to form a V) stands for victory and peace.

=== Color Red ===
The color red became prominent in the Marcos political machinery during the late 1970s through the Kilusang Bagong Lipunan. For the loyalist camp, red signifies strength, unyielding political continuity, nationalism tied to the strongman era, and a direct counter-symbol to the anti-Marcos opposition's yellow. Loyalists also clarified that their usage of color red is not the same as Leftist, Communists usage of the color, in which they called "hijacking of the terrorists".

== Allied parties and organizations ==
=== Political parties ===
- Kilusang Bagong Lipunan (a political party loyal to Marcos Sr. formed as merger of former Nacionalista and Liberal members)
- Partido Federal ng Pilipinas
- Nationalist People's Coalition
- National Unity Party
- Bangon Pilipinas Party
- Loyalist Party of the Philippines
- Grand Alliance for Democracy (an electoral alliance formed by Marcos Loyalists and breakaway factions of Pro Aquino movement in 1987 that stands as an opposition against Corazon Aquino's presidency)

=== Political organizations ===
- Kabataang Barangay (currently Sangguniang Kabataan)
- Marcos Loyalist Movement
- One Nation Movement
- Kilusang Pilipinismo (founded by Nilo Tayag, a former member of the Communist Party of the Philippines)
- United Vloggers and Influencers of the Philippines (A group of internet vloggers formed in 2022 to support Marcos Jr.'s presidency)
- Alyansa Bantay Kapayapaan at Demokrasya (a multi-sectoral and civic alliance in the Philippines that actively voices support for the administration of President Ferdinand "Bongbong" Marcos Jr., particularly regarding national sovereignty and anti-disinformation campaigns.)
- Reform the Armed Forces Movement (a once Anti Marcos military cabal who later pledged loyalty to Marcos Sr., and staged several unsuccessful coups against then-president Corazon Aquino)

== List of Marcos loyalists ==
- Joseph Estrada, 13th President of the Philippines from 1998 to 2001
- Juan Ponce Enrile, defense minister during Martial Law
- Gregorio Honasan, Philippine Army officer
- Fabian Ver, former chief of staff
- Arturo Tolentino, lawyer, diplomat, Marcos Sr.'s running mate during 1986 snap election
- Ferdinand Topacio, lawyer (he clarifies during his interview in Politika All the Way that he only supports Marcos Sr.)
- Blas Ople, journalist, foreign affairs, and labor secretary
- Francisco Tatad, journalist and politician
- Larry Gadon, disbarred lawyer and serves as Presidential Adviser on Poverty Alleviation since 2023
- Rene Cayetano, journalist, lawyer, and politician
- Oliver Lozano, legal counsel of President Marcos Sr.
- Vicente Millora, lawyer and politician
- Nicanor Yñiguez, lawyer and politician
- Nilo Tayag, bishop and activist
- Ruben Guevarra, former Communist rebel
- Luis Taruc, former Communist rebel
- Chavit Singson, businessman, former Governor of Ilocos Sur
- Roberto Benedicto, lawyer, ambassador, diplomat, and businessman
- Danding Cojuangco, businessman and politician
- Rigoberto Tiglao, activist and opinion columnist
- Rita Gadi, author
- Cherry Cobarrubias, businessperson and film producer
- Julio Cardinal Rosales, archbishop of Cebu, CBCP president from 1970 to 1974
- Teopisto Alberto, archbishop of Sorsogon, CBCP president from 1974 to 1977
- Domingo Nebres, monsignor
- Manuel Aspiras, monsignor and parish priest in Ilocos Norte
- Juan Sison, archbishop in Vigan, Ilocos Sur
- Charles Van den Ouwelant, bishop in Surigao, hardline Anti-communist
- Alicia Lipata, vlogger
- Mike Cervera, vlogger
- John Anthony Jaboya, vlogger
- Nora Aunor, actress
- Amalia Fuentes, actress
- Elizabeth Oropesa, actress
- Herbert Bautista, actor and politician
- J.C. Bonnin, retired actor
- Weng Weng, actor and martial artist
- Imelda Papin, singer and politician
- Victor Wood, singer and politician
- Florante, singer
- Hajji Alejandro, singer
- Harrold Toledana, Content Creator, Youth advocate

== Legacy ==
Following the 1986 People Power Revolution and the end of the dictatorship, the Marcos family returned from exile in the 1990s and gradually re-established their political influence in the Philippines. Over the following decades, family members and political allies engaged in efforts to rehabilitate the regime's historical narrative, frequently presenting the martial law period as a "golden age" of infrastructure development and law and order.

The concept of Marcos loyalism saw a major revival with the election of Bongbong Marcos as president in 2022. Some media have described this resurgence as a "Marcosian restoration".

== See also ==
- Presidency of Ferdinand Marcos
- Cronies of Ferdinand Marcos
- Ferdinand Marcos's cult of personality
- Marcos family
- Rolex 12
- Diehard Duterte Supporters
