= 1987 Philippine Senate election =

23rd Philippine senatorial election

- May 11, 1987

All 24 seats in the Senate 13 seats needed for a majority
	Majority party	Minority party
Party	LABAN	GAD
Seats won	22	2
Popular vote	243,237,045	98,060,057
Percentage	64.89	26.16
- Results showing the alliance affiliation of first-placed candidates by region
Senate President before election
Abolished
Last held by: Gil Puyat
Nacionalista
Elected Senate President
Jovito Salonga
LABAN

The 23rd election of members to the Senate of the Philippines was held on Monday, May 11, 1987. The Senate was re-instituted following the approval of a new constitution in 1987 restoring the bicameral Congress of the Philippines; earlier, a constitution was approved in 1973 that created a unicameral Batasang Pambansa (parliament) that replaced the bicameral Congress. The last Senate election prior to this was the 1971 election.

The Lakas ng Bayan (LABAN) got 64.9% of the vote but won 22 out of 24 seats in the Senate; only two candidates from the opposition Grand Alliance for Democracy won: former Secretary of National Defense Juan Ponce Enrile and San Juan Mayor Joseph Estrada, despite getting 26.6% of the vote.

Along with the 1916, 1941 and the 1992 elections, this is the third senatorial election where all seats were up.

== Electoral system ==
The 1987 constitution reintroduced the bicameral Congress, restoring the Senate. Philippine Senate elections are held via plurality block voting with staggered elections, with the country as an at-large district. The Senate has 24 seats, of which all 24 seats were up for this election. Each voter has 24 votes, can vote up to 24 names, and the 24 candidates with the highest number of votes winning the seats. All winners shall serve until 1992.

== Background ==
After Marcos was ousted in the People Power Revolution in 1986, his political party, the Kilusang Bagong Lipunan, was fragmented. Almost all its members including Assemblymen Arturo Tolentino, Jose Roño, Nicanor Yñiguez, Cesar Virata who were coming from the Nacionalista Party among others were orphaned.

On the other hand, the Aquino coalition took all positions in the Ministry/Cabinet. Most notable were Prime Minister Salvador Laurel, Local Government Minister Aquilino Pimentel Jr. and Executive Secretary Joker Arroyo.

The Lakas ng Bayan (LABAN) consists of the PDP–Laban headed by Local Government Minister Pimentel, the Lakas ng Bansa party headed by Assemblyman Ramon Mitra Jr., the UNIDO, the Liberal Party headed by Senator Jovito Salonga, the National Union of Christian Democrats headed by Raul Manglapus, the Bayang Nagkakaisa sa Diwa at Layunin (BANDILA) headed by Butz Aquino, Panaghuisa and other pro-Cory regional parties

The GAD consists of the faction of the KBL headed by Assemblyman Arturo Tolentino, the Jose Roy faction of the Nacionalista Party headed by Renato Cayetano, the pre-1986 opposition leaders who defected from Aquino headed by Senator Eva Estrada-Kalaw, the Partido Nacionalista ng Pilipinas headed by Former Labor Minister Blas Ople, the Mindanao Alliance, the Muslim Federal Party and the Christian Social Democratic Party.

The UPP-KBL coalition was composed of pro-Marcos forces. This coalition included some GAD candidates as guest candidates, and was considered to be the loyalist politicians of the Marcos government.

The Left also put up a seven-man slate, under the Partido ng Bayan banner. This includes the Bagong Alyansang Makabayan and its allied organizations.

Other political parties who fielded candidates are the Lapiang Manggagawa, Lakas ng Bansa and the Partido Nacionalista ng Pilipinas, along with several independent candidates.

== Candidates ==
There were major four coalitions for this election, of which two put up complete 24-person slate, while one had guest candidates to complete its slates, and one had a 7-member slate:

- Lakas ng Bayan (People Power), supporters of President Corazon Aquino
- Grand Alliance for Democracy, opposes Aquino
- Union for Peace and Progress–Kilusang Bagong Lipunan (New Society Movement): supporters of former president Ferdinand Marcos
- Partido ng Bayan (Party of the Nation), by the leftist Bagong Alyansang Makabayan

Main coalitions
Lakas ng Bayan (LABAN)	Grand Alliance for Democracy (GAD)	Union for Peace and Progress–Kilusang Bagong Lipunan (UPP–KBL)	Partido ng Bayan (PnB)	Independents
Heherson Alvarez	Firdausi Ismail Abbas	Vicente Abangan	Crispin Beltran	Silvino Barsana Agudo
Edgardo Angara	Homobono Adaza	Salvador Britanico	Joe Burgos	Oswaldo Carbonell
Butz Aquino	Alejandro Almendras	Rommel Corro	Bernabe Buscayno	Elpidio Dizon
Arthur Defensor	Abul Khayr Alonto (Note: Defected from the Aquino administration)	Edilberto del Valle	Romeo Capulong	Rodolfo Fariñas
Neptali Gonzales	Rene Espina	Concordio Diel	Horacio Morales	Glicerio Gervero
Teofisto Guingona Jr.	Joseph Estrada	Joseph Estrada (Note: Guest candidate)	Nelia Sancho	Ramon A. Gonzales
Ernesto Herrera	Eva Estrada-Kalaw	Wenceslao Lagumbay	Jaime Tadeo	Manuel Manahan
Sotero Laurel	Wilson Gamboa	Macabangkit Lanto	—N/a	Carmelito Montano
Joey Lina	Romeo Jalosjos Sr.	Pacifico Lopez de Leon	—N/a	Manuel Pages
Ernesto Maceda	Roilo Golez	Vicente Magsaysay	—N/a	Elly Pamatong
Raul Manglapus	Wenceslao Lagumbay	Norma Precy Mathay	—N/a	Franco Rimando
Orly Mercado	Vicente Magsaysay	Vicente Millora	—N/a	Liberato Roldan
John Henry Osmeña	Jeremias Montemayor	Edith Nakpil-Rabat	—N/a	Ramon Revilla Sr.
Vicente Paterno	Edith Nakpil-Rabat	Salvador Panelo	—N/a	Julian Taasan
Nene Pimentel	Blas Ople	Leonardo Perez	—N/a	Antonio Velasco
Santanina Rasul	Rafael Palmares	Geronimo Quadra	—N/a	—N/a
Alberto Romulo	Zosimo Paredes	Antonio Raquiza	—N/a	—N/a
Rene Saguisag	Juan Ponce Enrile	Rafael Recto	—N/a	—N/a
Augusto Sanchez	Vicente Puyat	Isidro Rodriguez Sr.	—N/a	—N/a
Jovito Salonga	Isidro Rodriguez	Nilo Tayag	—N/a	—N/a
Leticia Ramos-Shahani	Francisco Tatad	Lorenzo Teves	—N/a	—N/a
Mamintal Tamano	Lorenzo Teves	Arturo Tolentino	—N/a	—N/a
Wigberto Tañada	Arturo Tolentino	Joaquin Venus	—N/a	—N/a
Victor Ziga	Fernando Veloso	Nicanor Yñiguez	—N/a	—N/a

Other tickets
Lapiang Manggagawa (LM)	Lakas ng Bayan (original; LABAN)	Partido Nacionalista ng Pilipinas (PNP)
Jacinto Tamayo	Juan T. David	Leopoldo Quesada
Bienvenido Medrano	—N/a	—N/a

== Results ==
The Lakas ng Bayan (LABAN) coalition won 22 seats, while the Grand Alliance for Democracy (GAD) won two.

Winners who had served in the 1935 constitution Senate were LABAN's Raul Manglapus, Ernesto Maceda, John Henry Osmeña, Jovito Salonga and Mamintal A.J. Tamano.

Winners who had served in the Batasang Pambansa were LABAN's Neptali Gonzales, Orlando S. Mercado, Aquilino Pimentel Jr., Alberto Romulo, and Victor Ziga, and GAD's Juan Ponce Enrile.

Winners who had neither served in the 1935 constitution Senate and in the 1973 constitution Batasang Pambansa were LABAN's Heherson Alvarez, Edgardo Angara, Butz Aquino, Teofisto Guingona Jr., Ernesto Herrera, Sotero Laurel, Joey Lina, Leticia Ramos-Shahani, Nina Rasul, Rene Saguisag and Wigberto Tañada, and GAD's Joseph Estrada.

The first 21 proclaimed winners were all seated on June 30, the day the terms start. The 22nd and 23rd senators were proclaimed a few days after June 30. Finally, the Commission on Elections, due to the tight race between GAD's Juan Ponce Enrile and LABAN's Augusto Sanchez, only declared the 24th winner by August.

	1	2	3	4	5	6	7	8	9	10	11	12	13	14	15	16	17	18	19	20	21	22	23	24
Before election	‡^	‡^	‡^	‡^	‡^	‡^	‡^	‡^	‡^	‡^	‡^	‡^	‡^	‡^	‡^	‡^	‡^	‡^	‡^	‡^	‡^	‡^	‡^	‡^
Election result	LABAN																						GAD	
After election	+	+	+	+	+	+	+	+	+	+	+	+	+	+	+	+	+	+	+	+	+	+	+	+
Senate bloc	Majority bloc																						Min bloc	

Key:

- ‡ Seats up
- + Gained by a party from another party
- ^ Vacancy

=== Per candidate ===
Candidate	Party	Votes	%
Jovito Salonga	Lakas ng Bayan	12,988,360	57.12
Butz Aquino	Lakas ng Bayan	12,426,432	54.65
Orly Mercado	Lakas ng Bayan	11,901,673	52.34
John Henry Osmeña	Lakas ng Bayan	11,299,102	49.69
Edgardo Angara	Lakas ng Bayan	11,288,407	49.64
Alberto Romulo	Lakas ng Bayan	11,119,193	48.90
Leticia Ramos-Shahani	Lakas ng Bayan	11,089,340	48.77
Rene Saguisag	Lakas ng Bayan	10,871,850	47.81
Neptali Gonzales	Lakas ng Bayan	10,855,796	47.74
Joey Lina	Lakas ng Bayan	10,679,150	46.96
Wigberto Tañada	Lakas ng Bayan	10,420,831	45.83
Heherson Alvarez	Lakas ng Bayan	10,288,113	45.24
Sotero Laurel	Lakas ng Bayan	10,278,729	45.20
Joseph Estrada	Grand Alliance for Democracy (Note: Guest candidate of Union for Peace and Progress–Kilusang Bagong Lipunan)	10,029,978	44.11
Teofisto Guingona Jr.	Lakas ng Bayan	9,957,591	43.79
Raul Manglapus	Lakas ng Bayan	9,910,244	43.58
Vicente Paterno	Lakas ng Bayan	9,647,680	42.43
Victor Ziga	Lakas ng Bayan	9,489,132	41.73
Ernesto Maceda	Lakas ng Bayan	9,381,682	41.26
Nene Pimentel	Lakas ng Bayan	9,042,696	39.77
Ernesto Herrera	Lakas ng Bayan	8,474,297	37.27
Mamintal A.J. Tamano	Lakas ng Bayan	8,102,231	35.63
Santanina Rasul	Lakas ng Bayan	7,966,882	35.03
Juan Ponce Enrile	Grand Alliance for Democracy	7,964,966	35.03
Augusto Sanchez	Lakas ng Bayan	7,891,932	34.71
Arthur Defensor Sr.	Lakas ng Bayan	7,865,702	34.59
Eva Estrada-Kalaw	Grand Alliance for Democracy	6,922,810	30.44
Vicente Puyat	Grand Alliance for Democracy	6,859,307	30.16
Alejandro Almendras	Grand Alliance for Democracy	6,317,107	27.78
Blas Ople	Grand Alliance for Democracy	5,736,911	25.23
Arturo Tolentino	Grand Alliance for Democracy	5,725,189	25.18
Vicente Magsaysay	Grand Alliance for Democracy	5,500,447	24.19
Ramon Revilla Sr.	Independent	5,203,982	22.88
Rene Espina	Grand Alliance for Democracy	5,107,313	22.46
Francisco Tatad	Grand Alliance for Democracy	4,743,678	20.86
Homobono Adaza	Grand Alliance for Democracy	4,657,782	20.48
Roilo Golez	Grand Alliance for Democracy	4,657,782	20.48
Rafael Recto	Union for Peace and Progress–Kilusang Bagong Lipunan	3,277,088	14.41
Romeo Jalosjos Sr.	Grand Alliance for Democracy	3,131,226	13.77
Wilson Gamboa Sr.	Grand Alliance for Democracy	2,450,523	10.78
Isidro Rodriguez	Grand Alliance for Democracy	2,326,937	10.23
Wenceslao Lagumbay	Grand Alliance for Democracy	2,168,086	9.53
Abul Khayr Alonto	Grand Alliance for Democracy	1,998,261	8.79
Rafael Palmares	Grand Alliance for Democracy	1,974,023	8.68
Lorenzo Teves	Grand Alliance for Democracy	1,790,962	7.88
Zosimo Paredes	Grand Alliance for Democracy	1,786,271	7.86
Rodolfo Fariñas	Independent	1,668,147	7.34
Fernando R. Veloso	Grand Alliance for Democracy	1,660,100	7.30
Merced Edith Nakpil-Rabat	Grand Alliance for Democracy	1,655,065	7.28
Leonardo B. Perez	Union for Peace and Progress–Kilusang Bagong Lipunan	1,559,353	6.86
Jeremias U. Montemayor	Grand Alliance for Democracy	1,522,413	6.69
Salvador Britanico	Union for Peace and Progress–Kilusang Bagong Lipunan	1,501,159	6.60
Nicanor Yñiguez	Union for Peace and Progress–Kilusang Bagong Lipunan	1,429,910	6.29
Firdausi Ismail Abbas	Grand Alliance for Democracy	1,372,920	6.04
Horacio Morales	Alliance for New Politics	1,327,920	5.84
Bernabe Buscayno	Alliance for New Politics	1,307,527	5.75
Joe Burgos	Alliance for New Politics	1,300,596	5.72
Nelia Sancho	Alliance for New Politics	1,264,375	5.56
Vicente Millora	Union for Peace and Progress–Kilusang Bagong Lipunan	1,242,115	5.46
Crispin Beltran	Alliance for New Politics	1,154,593	5.08
Jaime Tadeo	Alliance for New Politics	1,093,995	4.81
Romeo Capulong	Alliance for New Politics	1,063,818	4.68
Macabangkit Lanto	Union for Peace and Progress–Kilusang Bagong Lipunan	861,506	3.79
Pacifico Lopez de Leon	Union for Peace and Progress–Kilusang Bagong Lipunan	836,316	3.68
Antonio Raquiza	Union for Peace and Progress–Kilusang Bagong Lipunan	771,951	3.39
Norma Precy Mathay	Union for Peace and Progress–Kilusang Bagong Lipunan	743,573	3.27
Nilo Tayag	Union for Peace and Progress–Kilusang Bagong Lipunan	721,431	3.17
Concordio Diel	Union for Peace and Progress–Kilusang Bagong Lipunan	573,248	2.52
Manuel Manahan	Independent	570,979	2.51
Joaquin Venus	Union for Peace and Progress–Kilusang Bagong Lipunan	554,644	2.44
Vicente Abangan	Union for Peace and Progress–Kilusang Bagong Lipunan	549,901	2.42
Edilberto A. del Valle	Union for Peace and Progress–Kilusang Bagong Lipunan	468,522	2.06
Rommel Corro	Union for Peace and Progress–Kilusang Bagong Lipunan	459,758	2.02
Geronimo Quadra	Union for Peace and Progress–Kilusang Bagong Lipunan	402,346	1.77
Salvador Panelo	Union for Peace and Progress–Kilusang Bagong Lipunan	393,413	1.73
Oswaldo Carbonell	Independent	326,848	1.44
Antonio Velasco	Independent	261,707	1.15
Jacinto Tamayo	Lapiang Manggagawa	155,353	0.68
Juan T. David	Lakas ng Bayan (original)	101,499	0.45
Carmelito Montano	Independent	85,425	0.38
Elpidio Dizon	Independent	79,080	0.35
Bienvenido Medrano	Lapiang Manggagawa	59,653	0.26
Leopoldo Quesada	Partido Nacionalista ng Pilipinas	55,519	0.24
Manuel Pages	Independent	29,908	0.13
Franco Rimando	Independent	26,650	0.12
Glicerio Gervero	Independent	18,750	0.08
Silvino Barsana Agudo	Independent	11,250	0.05
Julian Taasan	Independent	7,501	0.03
Ramon A. Gonzales	Independent	3,750	0.02
Elly Pamatong	Independent	3,098	0.01
Liberato Roldan	Independent	2,487	0.01
Total		374,827,746	100.00
Total votes		22,739,995	–
Registered voters/turnout		26,569,539	85.59

=== Per coalition ===
Party	Votes	%	Seats
Lakas ng Bayan	243,237,045	64.89	22
Grand Alliance for Democracy	98,060,057	26.16	2
Union for Peace and Progress–Kilusang Bagong Lipunan	16,346,234	4.36	0
Alliance for New Politics	8,512,824	2.27	0
Lapiang Manggagawa	215,006	0.06	0
Lakas ng Bayan (original)	101,499	0.03	0
Partido Nacionalista ng Pilipinas	55,519	0.01	0
Independent	8,299,562	2.21	0
Total	374,827,746	100.00	24
Total votes	22,739,995	–	
Registered voters/turnout	26,569,539	85.59	

Vote share
LABAN	64.89%
GAD	26.16%
Others	9.95%

Senate seats
LABAN	91.67%
GAD	8.33%
Others	0.00%

== See also ==
- 1987 Philippine House of Representatives elections
- Commission on Elections
- 8th Congress of the Philippines
