= 1998 Philippine general election =

- May 11, 1998
- Registered: 33,873,665
- Turnout: 29,285,775
- 1998 Philippine presidential election
- May 11, 1998
- Turnout: 86.5% ▲11.0%
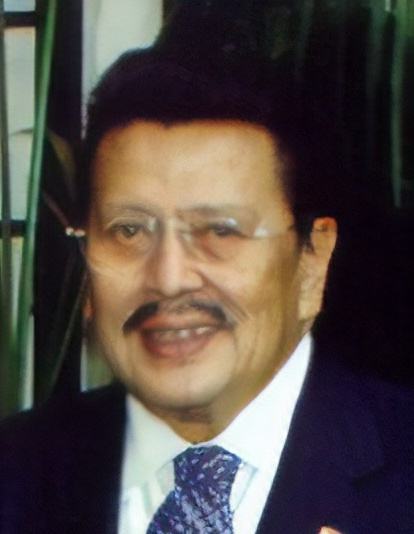

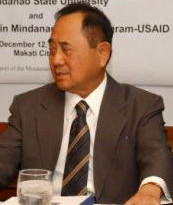

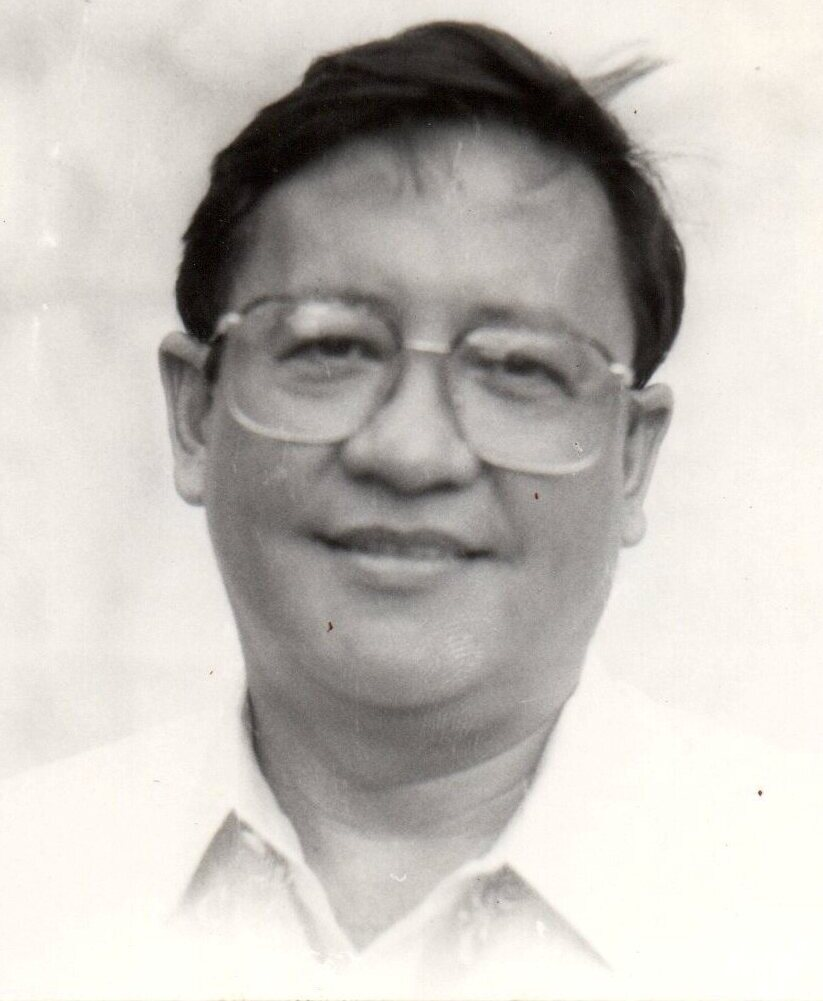
| Nominee | Joseph Estrada | Jose de Venecia Jr. | Raul Roco |
| Party | LAMMP | Lakas | Aksyon |
| Running mate | Edgardo Angara | Gloria Macapagal Arroyo | Irene Santiago |
| Popular vote | 10,722,295 | 4,268,483 | 3,720,212 |
| Percentage | 39.86% | 15.87% | 13.38% |
President before election
Fidel V. Ramos
Lakas
Elected President
Joseph Estrada
LAMMP
- 1998 Philippine vice presidential election
- May 11, 1998
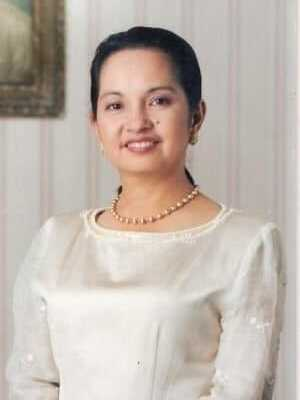

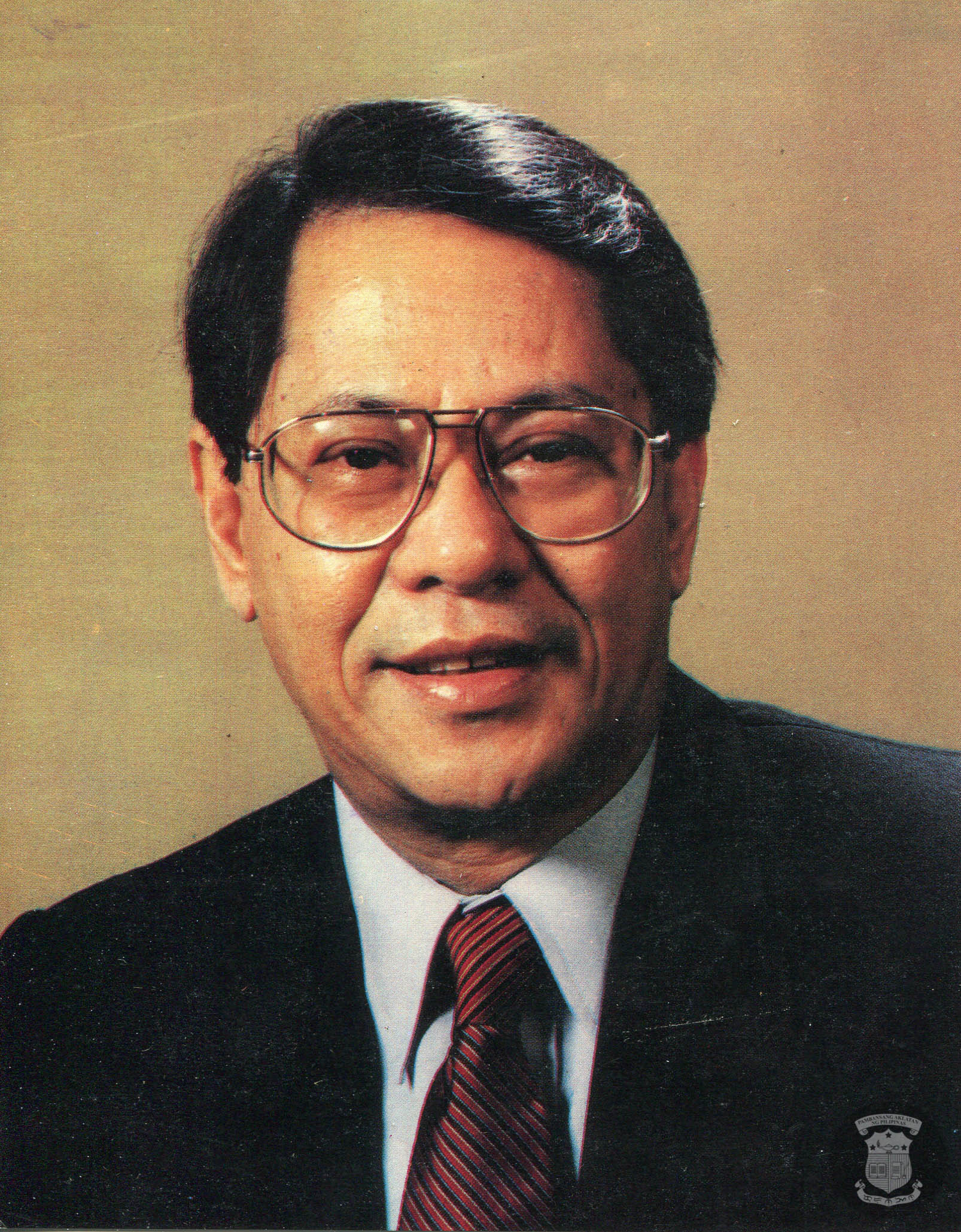

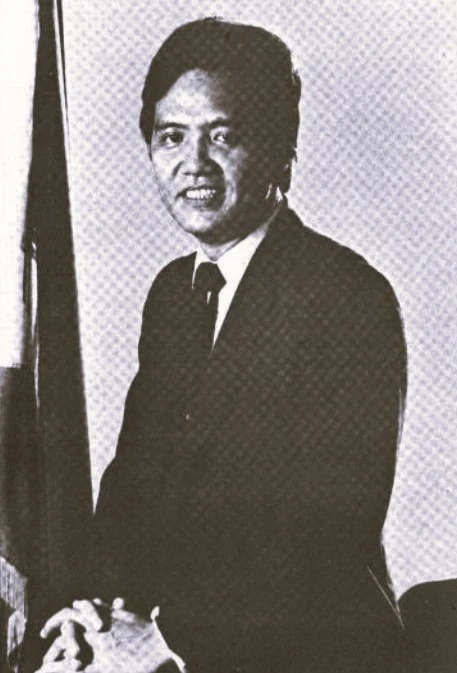
| Candidate | Gloria Macapagal Arroyo | Edgardo Angara | Oscar Orbos |
| Party | Lakas | LAMMP | Reporma |
| Popular vote | 12,667,252 | 5,652,068 | 3,321,779 |
| Percentage | 49.56% | 22.11% | 13.00% |
Vice President before election
Joseph Estrada
LAMMP
Elected Vice President
Gloria Macapagal Arroyo
Lakas
- 1998 Philippine Senate election
- May 11, 1998

12 (of the 24) seats in the Senate 13 seats needed for a majority
| | First party | Second party |
|---|---|---|
| Party | Lakas | LDP |
| Seats won | 5 | 7 |
| Popular vote | 93,261,379 | 91,421,394 |
| Percentage | 45.44 | 44.54 |
Senate President before election
Neptali Gonzales
LDP
Elected Senate President
Marcelo Fernan
LDP
- 1998 Philippine House of Representatives elections
- May 11, 1998
- All 257 seats in the House of Representatives (including 38 underhang seats); 129 seats needed for a majority
| Party | Vote % | Seats | +/– |
|---|---|---|---|
| Lakas | 49.01 | 111 | +11 |
| LAMMP | 26.68 | 55 | +55 |
| Liberal | 7.25 | 15 | +10 |
| NPC | 4.08 | 9 | −13 |
| Reporma | 3.95 | 4 | +4 |
| PROMDI | 2.40 | 4 | +4 |
| Aksyon | 0.44 | 1 | +1 |
| Ompia | 0.19 | 1 | +1 |
| Others | 1.42 | 4 | +4 |
| Independent | 3.42 | 2 | −5 |
| Party-list | — | 14 | +14 |
This lists parties that won seats. See the complete results below.
| Speaker before | Speaker after |
|---|---|
| Jose de Venecia Jr. Lakas | Manny Villar; LAMMP |

Presidential elections, legislative and local elections were held in the Philippines on May 11, 1998. In the presidential election, Vice President Joseph Estrada won a six-year term as president by a landslide victory. In the vice-presidential race, Senator Gloria Macapagal Arroyo won a six-year term as vice president also by a landslide victory. This was the third election where both president and vice president came from different parties.

== Candidates ==
=== Lakas–NUCD–UMDP ===
Lakas–NUCD–UMDP
For President
| Jose de Venecia Jr. | Lakas |
For Vice President
| Gloria Macapagal-Arroyo | Lakas |
For Senators
| Lisandro Abadia | Lakas |
| Rolando Andaya | Lakas |
| Robert Barbers | Lakas |
| Rene Cayetano | Lakas |
| Roberto De Ocampo | Lakas |
| Ricardo Gloria | Lakas |
| Teofisto Guingona Jr. | Lakas |
| Loren Legarda | Lakas |
| Roberto Pagdanganan | Lakas |
| Hernando Perez | Lakas |
| Nina Rasul | Lakas |
| Ramon Revilla Sr. | Lakas |

=== LAMMP ===
Laban ng Makabayang Masang Pilipino
For President
| Joseph Estrada | LAMMP |
For Vice President
| Edgardo Angara | LAMMP |
For Senators
| Tessie Aquino-Oreta | LDP |
| Ramon Bagatsing Jr. | LDP |
| Rodolfo Biazon | LDP |
| Robert Jaworski | PMP |
| Edcel Lagman | LDP |
| Blas Ople | LDP |
| John Henry Osmeña | NPC |
| Nene Pimentel | PDP–Laban |
| Miguel Romero | LDP |
| Tito Sotto | LDP |
| Ruben Torres | Independent |
| Freddie Webb | LDP |

== Results ==
=== President ===
| Candidate | Party | Votes | % |
|---|---|---|---|
| Joseph Estrada | Laban ng Makabayang Masang Pilipino | 10,722,295 | 39.86 |
| Jose de Venecia Jr. | Lakas–NUCD–UMDP | 4,268,483 | 15.87 |
| Raul Roco | Aksyon Demokratiko | 3,720,212 | 13.83 |
| Lito Osmeña | PROMDI | 3,347,631 | 12.44 |
| Alfredo Lim | Liberal Party | 2,344,362 | 8.71 |
| Renato de Villa | Partido para sa Demokratikong Reporma–Lapiang Manggagawa | 1,308,352 | 4.86 |
| Miriam Defensor Santiago | People's Reform Party | 797,206 | 2.96 |
| Juan Ponce Enrile | Independent | 343,139 | 1.28 |
| Santiago Dumlao | Kilusan para sa Pambansang Pagpapanibago | 32,212 | 0.12 |
| Manuel Morato | Partido Bansang Marangal | 18,644 | 0.07 |
| Total | | 26,902,536 | 100.00 |
| Valid votes | | 26,902,536 | 91.86 |
| Invalid/blank votes (Note: Includes 232,714 votes for Imelda Marcos (Kilusang Bagong Lipunan) who withdrew after the ballots were printed.) | | 2,383,239 | 8.14 |
| Total votes | | 29,285,775 | 100.00 |
| Registered voters/turnout | | 33,873,665 | 86.46 |
Source: Nohlen, Grotz, Hartmann, Hasall and Santos

=== Vice president ===
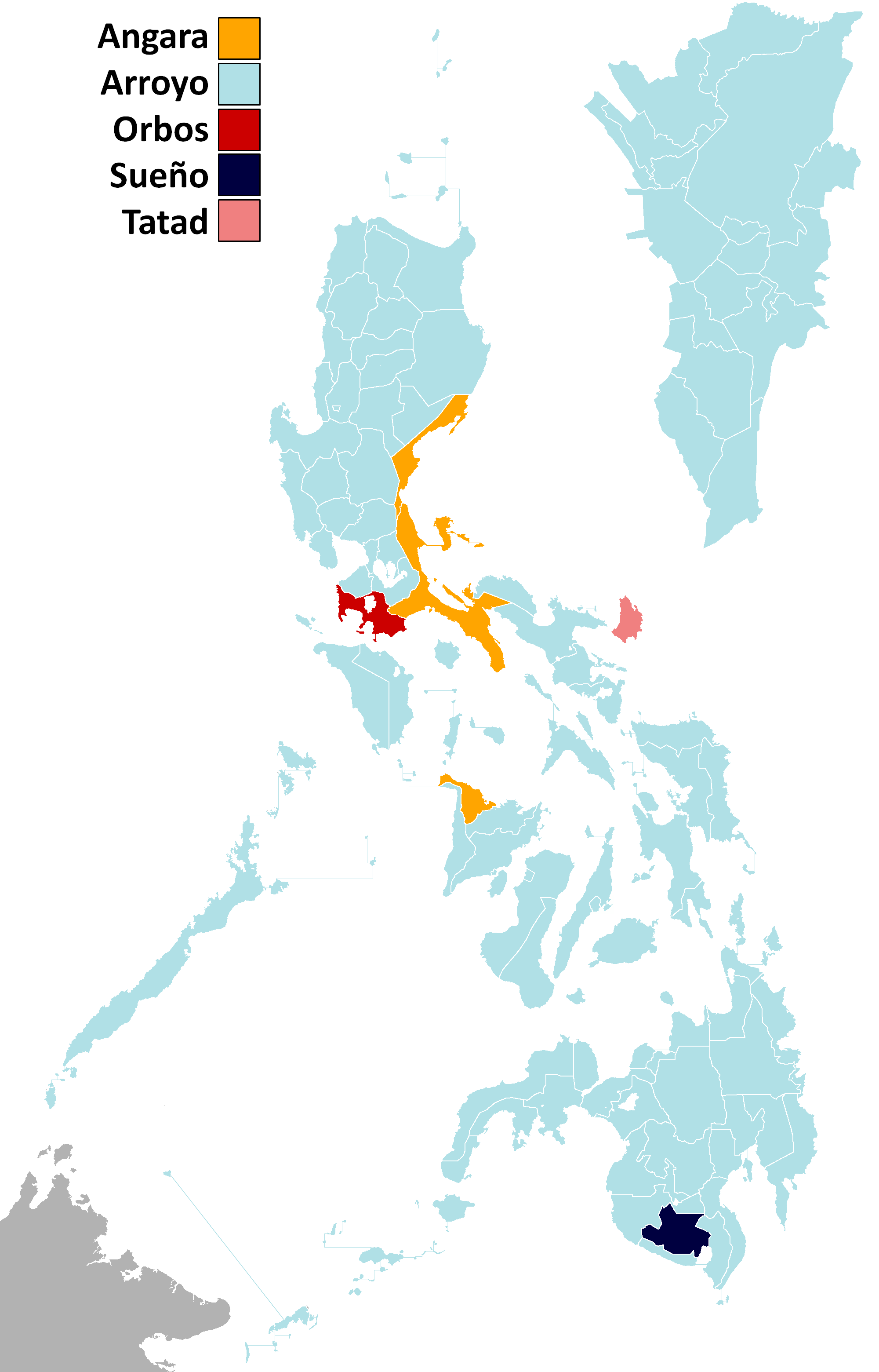
Vice presidential election per province/city.

| Candidate | Party | Votes | % |
|---|---|---|---|
| Gloria Macapagal Arroyo | Lakas–NUCD–UMDP | 12,667,252 | 49.56 |
| Edgardo Angara | Laban ng Makabayang Masang Pilipino | 5,652,068 | 22.11 |
| Oscar Orbos | Partido para sa Demokratikong Reporma–Lapiang Manggagawa | 3,321,779 | 13.00 |
| Serge Osmeña | Liberal Party | 2,351,462 | 9.20 |
| Francisco Tatad | Grand Alliance for Democracy | 745,389 | 2.92 |
| Ismael Sueno | PROMDI | 537,677 | 2.10 |
| Irene Santiago | Aksyon Demokratiko | 240,210 | 0.94 |
| Camilo Sabio | Partido Bansang Marangal | 22,010 | 0.09 |
| Reynaldo Pacheco | Kilusan para sa Pambansang Pagpapanibago | 21,422 | 0.08 |
| Total | | 25,559,269 | 100.00 |
| Valid votes | | 25,559,269 | 87.28 |
| Invalid/blank votes | | 3,726,506 | 12.72 |
| Total votes | | 29,285,775 | 100.00 |
| Registered voters/turnout | | 33,873,665 | 86.46 |

=== Senate ===
Representation of results; seats contested are inside the box. Lakas-NUCD-UMDP LDP NPC Aksyon Demokratiko GAD/Gabaybayan PDP–Laban PRP PMP Independent Vacancy

| Candidate | Party or alliance | | Votes | % |
|---|---|---|---|---|
| Loren Legarda | Lakas–NUCD–UMDP | | 14,933,965 | 50.99 |
| Rene Cayetano | Lakas–NUCD–UMDP | | 13,177,584 | 45.00 |
| Tito Sotto | Laban ng Makabayang Masang Pilipino | Laban ng Demokratikong Pilipino | 11,520,678 | 39.34 |
| Nene Pimentel | Laban ng Makabayang Masang Pilipino | PDP–Laban | 10,227,765 | 34.92 |
| Robert Barbers | Lakas–NUCD–UMDP | | 9,768,045 | 33.35 |
| Rodolfo Biazon | Laban ng Makabayang Masang Pilipino | Laban ng Demokratikong Pilipino | 9,352,964 | 31.94 |
| Blas Ople | Laban ng Makabayang Masang Pilipino | Laban ng Demokratikong Pilipino | 9,278,448 | 31.68 |
| John Henry Osmeña | Laban ng Makabayang Masang Pilipino | Nationalist People's Coalition | 9,242,652 | 31.56 |
| Robert Jaworski | Laban ng Makabayang Masang Pilipino | Partido ng Masang Pilipino | 8,968,616 | 30.62 |
| Ramon Revilla Sr. | Lakas–NUCD–UMDP | | 8,683,500 | 29.65 |
| Teofisto Guingona Jr. | Lakas–NUCD–UMDP | | 7,325,343 | 25.01 |
| Tessie Aquino-Oreta | Laban ng Makabayang Masang Pilipino | Laban ng Demokratikong Pilipino | 7,238,086 | 24.72 |
| Roberto Pagdanganan | Lakas–NUCD–UMDP | | 6,938,178 | 23.69 |
| Ruben Torres | Laban ng Makabayang Masang Pilipino | Independent | 6,923,821 | 23.64 |
| Edcel Lagman | Laban ng Makabayang Masang Pilipino | Laban ng Demokratikong Pilipino | 6,831,441 | 23.33 |
| Santanina Rasul | Lakas–NUCD–UMDP | | 6,695,955 | 22.86 |
| Rolando Andaya Sr. | Lakas–NUCD–UMDP | | 5,722,871 | 19.54 |
| Roberto de Ocampo | Lakas–NUCD–UMDP | | 5,663,401 | 19.34 |
| Lisandro Abadia | Lakas–NUCD–UMDP | | 5,426,378 | 18.53 |
| Haydee Yorac | Partido para sa Demokratikong Reporma–Lapiang Manggagawa | | 4,618,565 | 15.77 |
| Ricardo Gloria | Lakas–NUCD–UMDP | | 4,589,190 | 15.67 |
| Ramon Bagatsing Jr. | Laban ng Makabayang Masang Pilipino | Laban ng Demokratikong Pilipino | 4,540,475 | 15.50 |
| Freddie Webb | Laban ng Makabayang Masang Pilipino | Laban ng Demokratikong Pilipino | 4,514,475 | 15.42 |
| Hernando Perez | Lakas–NUCD–UMDP | | 4,336,969 | 14.81 |
| Rey Langit | Partido para sa Demokratikong Reporma–Lapiang Manggagawa | | 3,930,085 | 13.42 |
| Raul Daza | Liberal Party | | 2,995,851 | 10.23 |
| Miguel Luis Romero | Laban ng Makabayang Masang Pilipino | Laban ng Demokratikong Pilipino | 2,781,973 | 9.50 |
| Charito Plaza | Liberal Party | | 2,433,272 | 8.31 |
| Roy Señeres | Partido para sa Demokratikong Reporma–Lapiang Manggagawa | | 1,165,455 | 3.98 |
| Gerry Geronimo | Partido para sa Demokratikong Reporma–Lapiang Manggagawa | | 871,518 | 2.98 |
| Hadja Putri Zorayda Tamano | Partido para sa Demokratikong Reporma–Lapiang Manggagawa | | 855,738 | 2.92 |
| Roberto Sebastian | Partido para sa Demokratikong Reporma–Lapiang Manggagawa | | 721,824 | 2.46 |
| Jose Villegas | Partido para sa Demokratikong Reporma–Lapiang Manggagawa | | 608,186 | 2.08 |
| Renato Garcia | Kilusan para sa Pambansang Pagpapanibago | | 554,818 | 1.89 |
| David Castro | Kilusan para sa Pambansang Pagpapanibago | | 436,779 | 1.49 |
| Ludovico Badoy | Kilusan para sa Pambansang Pagpapanibago | | 388,465 | 1.33 |
| Oliver Lozano | Independent | | 352,037 | 1.20 |
| Abraham Iribani | Partido para sa Demokratikong Reporma–Lapiang Manggagawa | | 319,410 | 1.09 |
| Eduardo Bondoc | Kilusan para sa Pambansang Pagpapanibago | | 202,217 | 0.69 |
| Fred Henry Marallag | Kilusan para sa Pambansang Pagpapanibago | | 106,496 | 0.36 |
| Total | | | 205,243,489 | 100.00 |
| Total votes | | | 29,285,775 | – |
| Registered voters/turnout | | | 33,873,665 | 86.46 |

=== House of Representatives ===
The first party-list elections were held. Aside from voting for the representative from their congressional district, a voter can also vote for a party-list.

==== District elections ====
| Party | Votes | % | +/– | Seats | +/– |
|---|---|---|---|---|---|
| Lakas–NUCD–UMDP | 11,981,024 | 49.01 | +8.35 | 111 | +11 |
| Laban ng Makabayang Masang Pilipino | 6,520,744 | 26.68 | New | 55 | New |
| Liberal Party | 1,773,124 | 7.25 | +5.39 | 15 | +10 |
| Nationalist People's Coalition | 998,239 | 4.08 | −8.11 | 9 | −13 |
| Partido para sa Demokratikong Reporma | 966,653 | 3.95 | New | 4 | New |
| Probinsya Muna Development Initiative | 586,954 | 2.40 | New | 4 | New |
| PDP–Laban | 134,331 | 0.55 | −0.13 | 0 | −1 |
| Aksyon Demokratiko | 106,843 | 0.44 | New | 1 | New |
| Kabalikat ng Malayang Pilipino | 47,273 | 0.19 | New | 0 | New |
| Ompia Party | 46,462 | 0.19 | New | 1 | New |
| People's Reform Party | 38,640 | 0.16 | −0.73 | 0 | 0 |
| Kilusang Bagong Lipunan | 35,522 | 0.15 | New | 0 | 0 |
| Partido Demokratiko Sosyalista ng Pilipinas | 8,850 | 0.04 | −0.00 | 0 | 0 |
| Lapiang Manggagawa | 8,792 | 0.04 | −0.50 | 0 | 0 |
| Nacionalista Party | 4,412 | 0.02 | −0.78 | 0 | −1 |
| Partido ng Masang Pilipino | 2,010 | 0.01 | −0.52 | 0 | −1 |
| Kilusan para sa Pambansang Pagpapabago | 1,310 | 0.01 | New | 0 | New |
| Unaffiliated | 348,281 | 1.42 | New | 4 | New |
| Independent | 834,934 | 3.42 | −3.03 | 2 | −5 |
| Party-list seats (Note: Only 14 were seated in the party-list election.) | | | | 51 | +51 |
| Total | 24,444,398 | 100.00 | – | 257 | +37 |
| Valid votes | 24,444,398 | 83.47 | | | |
| Invalid/blank votes | 4,841,377 | 16.53 | | | |
| Total votes | 29,285,775 | 100.00 | | | |
| Registered voters/turnout | 33,873,665 | 86.46 | | | |
Source: Nohlen, Grotz and Hartmann and Teehankee

==== Party-list election ====
| Party | Votes | % | Seats |
|---|---|---|---|
| Association of Philippine Electric Cooperatives | 503,487 | 5.50 | 2 |
| Alyansang Bayanihan ng mga Magsasaka, Manggagawang Bukid at Mangingisda | 321,646 | 3.51 | 1 |
| Alagad | 312,500 | 3.41 | 1 |
| Veterans Federation Party | 304,902 | 3.33 | 1 |
| Probinsya Muna Development Initiative | 255,184 | 2.79 | 1 |
| Adhikain at Kilusan ng Ordinaryong Tao Para sa Lupa, Pabahay, Hanapbuhay at Kaunlaran | 239,042 | 2.61 | 1 |
| National Federation of Small Coconut Farmers Organization | 238,303 | 2.60 | 1 |
| Abanse! Pinay | 235,548 | 2.57 | 1 |
| Akbayan | 232,376 | 2.54 | 1 |
| Luzon Farmers Party | 215,643 | 2.36 | 1 |
| Sanlakas | 194,617 | 2.13 | 1 |
| Cooperative NATCCO Network Party | 189,802 | 2.07 | 1 |
| Philippine Coconut Producers Federation | 186,388 | 2.04 | 1 |
| Coalition of Associations of Senior Citizens in the Philippines | 143,444 | 1.57 | 0 |
| Others | 5,582,427 | 60.97 | 0 |
| Total | 9,155,309 | 100.00 | 14 |
| Valid votes | 9,155,309 | 31.26 | |
| Invalid/blank votes | 20,130,466 | 68.74 | |
| Total votes | 29,285,775 | 100.00 | |
| Registered voters/turnout | 33,873,665 | 86.46 | |
Source: Supreme Court, Dieter Nohlen

=== Local elections ===
Local elections for all positions above the barangay level, but below the regional level, were held on this day.

The newly created province of Compostela Valley (now known as "Davao de Oro") held its first local elections on this day as well.

==== Gubernatorial elections ====
The following are the results of the gubernatorial elections by party:

| Party | Seats |
|---|---|
| Lakas–NUCD–UMDP | 42 |
| Laban ng Makabayang Masang Pilipino | 23 |
| Nationalist People's Coalition | 3 |
| Partido para sa Demokratikong Reporma | 3 |
| Liberal Party | 2 |
| Kilusang Bagong Lipunan | 1 |
| PROMDI | 1 |
| Independents | 3 |
| Total | 78 |
Source: Commission on Elections

The following are the results of the gubernatorial elections by party:

| Province | Elected governor | Party |
|---|---|---|
| Abra | Maria Zita Valera | Lakas |
| Agusan del Norte | Angelica Amante | Lakas |
| Agusan del Sur | Valentina Plaza | LAMMP |
| Aklan | Florencio Miraflores | LAMMP |
| Albay | Al Francis Bichara | Lakas |
| Antique | Exequiel Javier | Lakas |
| Apayao | Batara Laoat | Lakas |
| Aurora | Edgardo Ong | Lakas |
| Basilan | Wahab Akbar | LAMMP |
| Bataan | Leonardo Roman | LAMMP |
| Batanes | Vicente Gato | Liberal |
| Batangas | Hermilando Mandanas | Reporma |
| Benguet | Raul Molintas | LAMMP |
| Biliran | Danilo Parilla | LAMMP |
| Bohol | Rene Relampagos | LAMMP |
| Bukidnon | Carlos Fortich | Lakas |
| Bulacan | Josefina dela Cruz | Lakas |
| Cagayan | Florencio Vargas | Lakas |
| Camarines Norte | Emmanuel Pimentel | NPC |
| Camarines Sur | Luis Villafuerte | LAMMP |
| Camiguin | Pedro Romualdo | Lakas |
| Capiz | Vicente Bermejo | Liberal |
| Catanduanes | Hector Sanchez | Lakas |
| Cavite | Bong Revilla | Lakas |
| Cebu | Pablo P. Garcia | PROMDI |
| Compostela Valley | Jose Caballero | LAMMP |
| Cotabato | Emmanuel Piñol | Lakas |
| Davao del Norte | Rodolfo del Rosario | Lakas |
| Davao del Sur | Rogelio Llanos | NPC |
| Davao Oriental | Rosalind Lopez | Lakas |
| Eastern Samar | Ruperto Ambil Jr. | LAMMP |
| Guimaras | JC Rahman Nava | LAMMP |
| Ifugao | Ildefonso Dulinayan | LAMMP |
| Ilocos Norte | Bongbong Marcos | KBL |
| Ilocos Sur | Chavit Singson | LAMMP |
| Iloilo | Arthur Defensor Sr. | Lakas |
| Isabela | Benjamin Dy | Lakas |
| Kalinga | Dominador Belac | Lakas |
| La Union | Justo Orros Jr. | Lakas |
| Laguna | Joey Lina | LAMMP |
| Lanao del Norte | Imelda Dimaporo | Lakas |
| Lanao del Sur | Mahid Mutilan | Lakas |
| Leyte | Remedios Petilla | Lakas |
| Maguindanao | Zacaria Candao | Lakas |
| Marinduque | Carmencita Reyes | Lakas |
| Masbate | Antonio Kho | Reporma |
| Misamis Occidental | Ernie Clarete | Reporma |
| Misamis Oriental | Antonio Calingin | LAMMP |
| Mountain Province | Leonard Mayaen | Lakas |
| Negros Occidental | Rafael Cosculluela | Independent |
| Negros Oriental | George Arnaiz | LAMMP |
| Northern Samar | Madeleine Ong | LAMMP |
| Nueva Ecija | Tomas Joson III | LAMMP |
| Nueva Vizcaya | Rodolfo Agbayani | Lakas |
| Occidental Mindoro | Josephine Sato | Lakas |
| Oriental Mindoro | Rodolfo Valencia | LAMMP |
| Palawan | Salvador Socrates | Lakas |
| Pampanga | Lito Lapid | Lakas |
| Pangasinan | Victor Agbayani | Independent |
| Quezon | Wilfrido Enverga | LAMMP |
| Quirino | Pedro Bacani | Independent |
| Rizal | Casimiro Ynares Jr. | LAMMP |
| Romblon | Perpetuo Ylagan | Lakas |
| Samar | Jose Roño | Lakas |
| Sarangani | Priscilla Chiongbian | Lakas |
| Siquijor | Lucito Balanay | Lakas |
| Sorsogon | Raul Lee | LAMMP |
| South Cotabato | Hilario de Pedro III | Lakas |
| Southern Leyte | Rosette Lerias | NPC |
| Sultan Kudarat | Pax Mangudadatu | Lakas |
| Sulu | Abdusakur Mahail Tan | Lakas |
| Surigao del Norte | Francisco Matugas | Lakas |
| Surigao del Sur | Primo Murillo | Lakas |
| Tarlac | Jose Yap | Lakas |
| Tawi-Tawi | Sadikul Sahali | Lakas |
| Zambales | Vicente Magsaysay | LAMMP |
| Zamboanga del Norte | Isagani Amatong | Lakas |
| Zamboanga del Sur | Isidoro Real Jr. | Lakas |
Source: Commission on Elections

==== Vice gubernatorial elections ====
The following are the results of the vice gubernatorial elections by party:

| Party | Seats |
|---|---|
| Lakas–NUCD–UMDP | 46 |
| Laban ng Makabayang Masang Pilipino | 19 |
| Partido para sa Demokratikong Reporma | 4 |
| Liberal Party | 3 |
| Nationalist People's Coalition | 1 |
| Ompia Party | 1 |
| Kilusang Bagong Lipunan | 1 |
| Independents | 3 |
| Total | 78 |
Source: Commission on Elections

The following are the results of the vice gubernatorial elections by province:

| Province | Elected vice governor | Party |
|---|---|---|
| Abra | Luis Bersamin Jr. | Lakas |
| Agusan del Norte | Roberto Tejano | Lakas |
| Agusan del Sur | Virginia Getes | LAMMP |
| Aklan | Jean Rodriguez | LAMMP |
| Albay | Jesus James Calisin | Lakas |
| Antique | Damian Marfil | Independent |
| Apayao | Paul Delwasen | Lakas |
| Aurora | Isaias Noveras Jr. | Lakas |
| Basilan | Bonnie Balamo | LAMMP |
| Bataan | Rogelio Roque | LAMMP |
| Batanes | Constante Castillejos | LAMMP |
| Batangas | Ricky Recto | Lakas |
| Benguet | Robert Tinda-an | LAMMP |
| Biliran | Carlos Chan Sr. | LAMMP |
| Bohol | Edgar Chatto | LAMMP |
| Bukidnon | Nemesio Beltran | Lakas |
| Bulacan | Aurelio Plamenco | Lakas |
| Cagayan | Oscar Pagulayan | Reporma |
| Camarines Norte | Renato Unico Jr. | Lakas |
| Camarines Sur | Imelda Papin | Lakas |
| Camiguin | Domingo Talian | Lakas |
| Capiz | Victor Tanco | Liberal |
| Catanduanes | Alfred Aquino | Lakas |
| Cavite | Jonvic Remulla | LAMMP |
| Cebu | Fernando Celeste | Lakas |
| Compostela Valley | Reynaldo Navarro | Lakas |
| Cotabato | Jesus Sacdalan | Lakas |
| Davao del Norte | Gelacio Gementiza | Reporma |
| Davao del Sur | Antonio Sunga | Lakas |
| Davao Oriental | Capistrano Roflo | Lakas |
| Eastern Samar | Emiliana Villacarillo | LAMMP |
| Guimaras | Edgar Espinosa | Lakas |
| Ifugao | Robert Mangyao | Lakas |
| Ilocos Norte | Mariano Nalupta Jr. | KBL |
| Ilocos Sur | Deogracias Victor Savellano | LAMMP |
| Iloilo | Demetrio Sonza | Lakas |
| Isabela | Edwin Uy | Lakas |
| Kalinga | Jocel Baac | Lakas |
| La Union | Aureo Augusto Nisce | Lakas |
| Laguna | Teresita Lazaro | LAMMP |
| Lanao del Norte | Timoteo Dacalos | Lakas |
| Lanao del Sur | Alim Mokhtar Abedin | Ompia |
| Leyte | Trinidad Apostol | Lakas |
| Maguindanao | Muslimin Ampatuan | Lakas |
| Marinduque | Teodorito Rejano | Lakas |
| Masbate | Mario Espinosa | Lakas |
| Misamis Occidental | Eufracio Lood | Lakas |
| Misamis Oriental | Danilo Lagbas | Lakas |
| Mountain Province | Mateo Chiyawan | Lakas |
| Negros Occidental | Romeo Gamboa Jr. | Independent |
| Negros Oriental | Edgar Teves | Lakas |
| Northern Samar | Ramon Lubos | Liberal |
| Nueva Ecija | Eduardo Joson IV | LAMMP |
| Nueva Vizcaya | Luisa Cuaresma | LAMMP |
| Occidental Mindoro | Godofredo Mintu | LAMMP |
| Oriental Mindoro | Bartolome Marasigan | Lakas |
| Palawan | Mario Joel Reyes | Lakas |
| Pampanga | Clayton Olalia | Lakas |
| Pangasinan | Oscar Lambino | Lakas |
| Quezon | Jovito Talabong | Reporma |
| Quirino | Reynaldo Galinato | Independent |
| Rizal | Benjamin Felix | LAMMP |
| Romblon | Jose Cesar Fonte | Lakas |
| Samar | Ernesto Arcales | Lakas |
| Sarangani | Miguel Escobar | Lakas |
| Siquijor | Arthur Chan | LAMMP |
| Sorsogon | Antonio Escudero Jr. | Lakas |
| South Cotabato | Arthur Pingoy Jr. | LAMMP |
| Southern Leyte | Eva Tomol | NPC |
| Sultan Kudarat | Rolando Recinto | Lakas |
| Sulu | Hadji Munib Estino | Lakas |
| Surigao del Norte | Cruz Yuipco Jr. | Lakas |
| Surigao del Sur | Tito Cañedo III | Lakas |
| Tarlac | Herminio Aquino | Liberal |
| Tawi-Tawi | Mohammad Abubakar | Lakas |
| Zambales | Cheryl Deloso | Reporma |
| Zamboanga del Norte | Concordio Adriatico | LAMMP |
| Zamboanga del Sur | Romeo Vera Cruz | Lakas |
Source: Commission on Elections

==== Provincial board elections ====
The following are the results of the provincial board elections by party:

| Party | Seats |
|---|---|
| Lakas–NUCD–UMDP | 408 |
| Laban ng Makabayang Masang Pilipino | 191 |
| Liberal Party | 40 |
| Nationalist People's Coalition | 19 |
| Partido para sa Demokratikong Reporma | 14 |
| PROMDI | 5 |
| Ompia Party | 3 |
| Kilusang Bagong Lipunan | 1 |
| PDP–Laban | 1 |
| Ummah Party | 1 |
| Independents | 33 |
| No data | 6 |
| Total | 722 |
Source: Commission on Elections

The following are the results of the provincial board elections by province:

| Province | Elected seats | Party | Seats won |
|---|---|---|---|
| Abra | 8 | Lakas | 7 |
| Abra | 8 | Independent | 1 |
| Agusan del Norte | 8 | Lakas | 7 |
| Agusan del Norte | 8 | LAMMP | 1 |
| Agusan del Sur | 10 | LAMMP | 9 |
| Agusan del Sur | 10 | Lakas | 1 |
| Aklan | 8 | LAMMP | 8 |
| Albay | 10 | Lakas | 7 |
| Albay | 10 | LAMMP | 2 |
| Albay | 10 | Independent | 1 |
| Antique | 8 | Lakas | 6 |
| Antique | 8 | LAMMP | 2 |
| Apayao | 8 | Lakas | 5 |
| Apayao | 8 | LAMMP | 2 |
| Apayao | 8 | Independent | 1 |
| Aurora | 8 | Lakas | 4 |
| Aurora | 8 | LAMMP | 3 |
| Aurora | 8 | Independent | 1 |
| Basilan | 8 | LAMMP | 5 |
| Basilan | 8 | Lakas | 3 |
| Bataan | 10 | LAMMP | 5 |
| Bataan | 10 | Liberal | 4 |
| Bataan | 10 | Lakas | 1 |
| Batanes | 6 | Liberal | 5 |
| Batanes | 6 | Lakas | 1 |
| Batangas | 10 | Lakas | 7 |
| Batangas | 10 | Reporma | 2 |
| Batangas | 10 | Independent | 1 |
| Benguet | 8 | LAMMP | 5 |
| Benguet | 8 | Lakas | 3 |
| Biliran | 8 | LAMMP | 5 |
| Biliran | 8 | Lakas | 3 |
| Bohol | 10 | LAMMP | 8 |
| Bohol | 10 | Lakas | 2 |
| Bukidnon | 10 | Lakas | 9 |
| Bukidnon | 10 | Liberal | 1 |
| Bulacan | 10 | Lakas | 8 |
| Bulacan | 10 | LAMMP | 2 |
| Cagayan | 10 | Lakas | 9 |
| Cagayan | 10 | LAMMP | 1 |
| Camarines Norte | 8 | Lakas | 4 |
| Camarines Norte | 8 | LAMMP | 4 |
| Camarines Sur | 10 | Lakas | 4 |
| Camarines Sur | 10 | LAMMP | 4 |
| Camarines Sur | 10 | NPC | 2 |
| Camiguin | 8 | Lakas | 5 |
| Camiguin | 8 | LAMMP | 2 |
| Camiguin | 8 | Independent | 1 |
| Capiz | 10 | Lakas | 6 |
| Capiz | 10 | Liberal | 4 |
| Catanduanes | 8 | Lakas | 7 |
| Catanduanes | 8 | Reporma | 1 |
| Cavite | 10 | LAMMP | 8 |
| Cavite | 10 | Lakas | 2 |
| Cebu | 10 | PROMDI | 5 |
| Cebu | 10 | Lakas | 3 |
| Cebu | 10 | LAMMP | 1 |
| Cebu | 10 | Independent | 1 |
| Compostela Valley | 10 | Lakas | 7 |
| Compostela Valley | 10 | LAMMP | 3 |
| Cotabato | 10 | Lakas | 8 |
| Cotabato | 10 | LAMMP | 1 |
| Cotabato | 10 | NPC | 1 |
| Davao del Norte | 10 | Lakas | 8 |
| Davao del Norte | 10 | Reporma | 2 |
| Davao del Sur | 10 | Lakas | 5 |
| Davao del Sur | 10 | LAMMP | 5 |
| Davao Oriental | 10 | Lakas | 8 |
| Davao Oriental | 10 | Independent | 2 |
| Eastern Samar | 10 | Lakas | 6 |
| Eastern Samar | 10 | LAMMP | 4 |
| Guimaras | 8 | Lakas | 7 |
| Guimaras | 8 | LAMMP | 1 |
| Ifugao | 8 | LAMMP | 4 |
| Ifugao | 8 | Lakas | 1 |
| Ifugao | 8 | Liberal | 1 |
| Ifugao | 8 | Independent | 2 |
| Ilocos Norte | 10 | Lakas | 6 |
| Ilocos Norte | 10 | LAMMP | 2 |
| Ilocos Norte | 10 | KBL | 1 |
| Ilocos Norte | 10 | Independent | 1 |
| Ilocos Sur | 10 | LAMMP | 6 |
| Ilocos Sur | 10 | Lakas | 2 |
| Ilocos Sur | 10 | Reporma | 1 |
| Ilocos Sur | 10 | Independent | 1 |
| Iloilo | 10 | Lakas | 6 |
| Iloilo | 10 | LAMMP | 3 |
| Iloilo | 10 | Independent | 1 |
| Isabela | 10 | Lakas | 8 |
| Isabela | 10 | NPC | 2 |
| Kalinga | 8 | LAMMP | 4 |
| Kalinga | 8 | Lakas | 1 |
| Kalinga | 8 | Liberal | 1 |
| Kalinga | 8 | Independent | 2 |
| La Union | 10 | Lakas | 4 |
| La Union | 10 | NPC | 4 |
| La Union | 10 | LAMMP | 1 |
| La Union | 10 | Liberal | 1 |
| Laguna | 10 | Lakas | 5 |
| Laguna | 10 | LAMMP | 5 |
| Lanao del Norte | 10 | Lakas | 9 |
| Lanao del Norte | 10 | LAMMP | 1 |
| Lanao del Sur | 8 | LAMMP | 3 |
| Lanao del Sur | 8 | Ompia | 3 |
| Lanao del Sur | 8 | Lakas | 1 |
| Lanao del Sur | 8 | Ummah | 1 |
| Leyte | 10 | Lakas | 9 |
| Leyte | 10 | Liberal | 1 |
| Maguindanao | 10 | Lakas | 8 |
| Maguindanao | 10 | LAMMP | 2 |
| Marinduque | 8 | Lakas | 5 |
| Marinduque | 8 | Independent | 3 |
| Masbate | 10 | Lakas | 8 |
| Masbate | 10 | Liberal | 1 |
| Masbate | 10 | Reporma | 1 |
| Misamis Occidental | 8 | Lakas | 7 |
| Misamis Occidental | 8 | Reporma | 1 |
| Misamis Oriental | 10 | Lakas | 7 |
| Misamis Oriental | 10 | LAMMP | 3 |
| Mountain Province | 8 | Lakas | 4 |
| Mountain Province | 8 | LAMMP | 2 |
| Mountain Province | 8 | Independent | 2 |
| Negros Occidental | 10 | Lakas | 3 |
| Negros Occidental | 10 | NPC | 2 |
| Negros Occidental | 10 | Independent | 5 |
| Negros Oriental | 10 | Lakas | 7 |
| Negros Oriental | 10 | LAMMP | 3 |
| Northern Samar | 10 | Liberal | 7 |
| Northern Samar | 10 | LAMMP | 2 |
| Northern Samar | 10 | Lakas | 1 |
| Nueva Ecija | 10 | LAMMP | 7 |
| Nueva Ecija | 10 | Lakas | 3 |
| Nueva Vizcaya | 10 | LAMMP | 7 |
| Nueva Vizcaya | 10 | Lakas | 3 |
| Occidental Mindoro | 10 | Lakas | 9 |
| Occidental Mindoro | 10 | LAMMP | 1 |
| Oriental Mindoro | 10 | Lakas | 6 |
| Oriental Mindoro | 10 | LAMMP | 4 |
| Palawan | 10 | Lakas | 7 |
| Palawan | 10 | LAMMP | 3 |
| Pampanga | 10 | Lakas | 5 |
| Pampanga | 10 | NPC | 3 |
| Pampanga | 10 | LAMMP | 1 |
| Pampanga | 10 | Independent | 1 |
| Pangasinan | 10 | Lakas | 5 |
| Pangasinan | 10 | LAMMP | 2 |
| Pangasinan | 10 | Reporma | 1 |
| Pangasinan | 10 | Independent | 2 |
| Quezon | 10 | Lakas | 6 |
| Quezon | 10 | LAMMP | 2 |
| Quezon | 10 | Liberal | 1 |
| Quezon | 10 | Reporma | 1 |
| Quirino | 8 | Lakas | 7 |
| Quirino | 8 | LAMMP | 1 |
| Rizal | 10 | LAMMP | 8 |
| Rizal | 10 | Lakas | 1 |
| Rizal | 10 | Liberal | 1 |
| Romblon | 8 | Lakas | 7 |
| Romblon | 8 | Reporma | 1 |
| Samar | 10 | Lakas | 6 |
| Samar | 10 | Liberal | 4 |
| Sarangani | 8 | Lakas | 6 |
| Sarangani | 8 | LAMMP | 2 |
| Siquijor | 8 | Lakas | 6 |
| Siquijor | 8 | LAMMP | 1 |
| Siquijor | 8 | Independent | 1 |
| Sorsogon | 10 | Lakas | 6 |
| Sorsogon | 10 | LAMMP | 4 |
| South Cotabato | 10 | LAMMP | 5 |
| South Cotabato | 10 | Lakas | 4 |
| South Cotabato | 10 | Independent | 1 |
| Southern Leyte | 8 | Lakas | 7 |
| Southern Leyte | 8 | NPC | 1 |
| Sultan Kudarat | 10 | Lakas | 5 |
| Sultan Kudarat | 10 | NPC | 4 |
| Sultan Kudarat | 10 | Independent | 1 |
| Sulu | 8 | Lakas | 7 |
| Sulu | 8 | LAMMP | 1 |
| Surigao del Norte | 10 | Lakas | 7 |
| Surigao del Norte | 10 | Liberal | 3 |
| Surigao del Sur | 10 | Lakas | 8 |
| Surigao del Sur | 10 | LAMMP | 2 |
| Tarlac | 10 | Liberal | 5 |
| Tarlac | 10 | Lakas | 4 |
| Tarlac | 10 | PDP–Laban | 1 |
| Tawi-Tawi | 6 | No data | 6 |
| Zambales | 10 | Lakas | 5 |
| Zambales | 10 | Reporma | 3 |
| Zambales | 10 | LAMMP | 1 |
| Zambales | 10 | Independent | 1 |
| Zamboanga del Norte | 10 | Lakas | 7 |
| Zamboanga del Norte | 10 | LAMMP | 3 |
| Zamboanga del Sur | 10 | Lakas | 6 |
| Zamboanga del Sur | 10 | LAMMP | 4 |
Source: Commission on Elections

== See also ==
- Commission on Elections
- Politics of the Philippines
- Philippine elections
- President of the Philippines
- 11th Congress of the Philippines
