= List of senators of the Philippines in the 11th Congress by seniority =

This is a complete list of senators of the Philippines during the 11th Congress of the Philippines listed by seniority from June 30, 1998, to June 30, 2001.

The criteria for seniority used in this article are derived from the cumulative length of service of a member of the Senate prior to the current Congress. Although an official roster ranking senators by seniority is not publicly available, their total cumulative years of service have been used to determine seniority. It has long been customary, following the practice of the United States Senate, to elect the most senior senator as either president of the Senate or president pro tempore, although this practice has become less common in the modern Senate. Furthermore, seniority is traditionally considered in the selection of chairpersons of major Senate committees.

In cases where senators have equal cumulative service, seniority is determined by the following criteria, in order:

- Longest uninterrupted period of service
- Earlier date on which the cumulative length of service was achieved
- Alphabetical order of surnames

In this Congress, John Henry Osmeña was the most senior senator, having previously served eight years in Senate, while Robert Jaworski was the most junior senator.

== List of senators by seniority ==
Rank	Senator	Party		Length of previous tenures (Dates of previous tenures)	Notes
Rank	Senator	Start of Congress	End of Congress	Length of previous tenures (Dates of previous tenures)	Notes
1	John Henry Osmeña	LDP		8 years, 268 days (December 30, 1971 – September 23, 1972; June 30, 1987 – June 30, 1995)	Senate president pro tempore (July 26, 1999 – April 12, 2000)
2	Juan Ponce Enrile	Independent	LDP	7 years, 320 days (August 15, 1987 – June 30, 1992; June 30, 1995 – June 30, 1998)	
3	Teofisto Guingona Jr.	Lakas		6 years, 6 days (June 30, 1987 – July 6, 1993)	Resigned on February 7, 2001, upon being appointed as Vice President of the Philippines.
4	Nikki Coseteng	NPC		6 years, 0 days (June 30, 1992 – June 30, 1998)	
5	Blas Ople	LDP		6 years, 0 days (June 30, 1992 – June 30, 1998)	Senate president pro tempore (until July 26, 1999; from April 12, 2000); Senate president (acting, June 28 – July 26, 1999; July 26, 1999 – April 12, 2000)
6	Ramon Revilla Sr.	Lakas		6 years, 0 days (June 30, 1992 – June 30, 1998)	
7	Raul Roco	Aksyon		6 years, 0 days (June 30, 1992 – June 30, 1998)	Resigned on February 9, 2001, upon being appointed as Secretary of Education, Culture and Sports.
8	Tito Sotto	LDP		6 years, 0 days (June 30, 1992 – June 30, 1998)	
9	Francisco Tatad	Gabay Bayan		6 years, 0 days (June 30, 1992 – June 30, 1998)	
10	Nene Pimentel	PDP–Laban		5 years, 0 days (June 30, 1987 – June 30, 1992)	Senate president (from November 13, 2000)
11	Rodolfo Biazon	LDP		3 years, 0 days (June 30, 1992 – June 30, 1995)	
12	Miriam Defensor Santiago	PRP		3 years, 0 days (June 30, 1995 – June 30, 1998)	
13	Franklin Drilon	LAMMP	Independent	3 years, 0 days (June 30, 1995 – June 30, 1998)	Senate president (April 12 – November 13, 2000)
14	Marcelo Fernan	LDP		3 years, 0 days (June 30, 1995 – June 30, 1998)	Senate president (until June 28, 1999); Died on July 11, 1999.
15	Juan Flavier	Lakas		3 years, 0 days (June 30, 1995 – June 30, 1998)	
16	Gregorio Honasan	Independent		3 years, 0 days (June 30, 1995 – June 30, 1998)	
17	Ramon Magsaysay Jr.	LAMMP	Independent	3 years, 0 days (June 30, 1995 – June 30, 1998)	
18	Serge Osmeña	Liberal	PDP–Laban	3 years, 0 days (June 30, 1995 – June 30, 1998)	
19	Tessie Aquino-Oreta	LDP			
20	Robert Barbers	Lakas			
21	Rene Cayetano	Lakas			
22	Loren Legarda	Lakas			
23	Robert Jaworski	PMP	Lakas		
