= Recto (surname) =

Recto is a surname. Notable people with the surname include:

- Claro M. Recto (1890–1960), Filipino politician
- Rafael Recto (1931–2008), Filipino sports shooter
- Ralph Recto (born 1964), Filipino politician
- Vilma Santos-Recto (born 1953), Filipina actress
