= Homobono Adaza =

Filipino lawyer and former politician

Commissioner of the Commission on Immigration and Deportation
- In office 1998–1998

Member of the Batasang Pambansa for Misamis Oriental
- In office July 19, 1984 – March 25, 1986

Governor of Misamis Oriental
- In office March 3, 1980 – July 19, 1984
- Vice Governor: Fernando Pacana Jr.
- Preceded by: Meynardo Tiro
- Succeeded by: Fernando Pacana Jr.

Personal details
- Party: Mindanao Alliance
- Education: University of the Philippines College of Law
- Profession: Lawyer

Homobono A. Adaza, commonly known as Bono Adaza, is a Filipino lawyer, author and former politician. He served as Governor of Misamis Oriental from 1980 until his election to the Batasang Pambansa in 1984. He later served briefly as commissioner of the Commission on Immigration and Deportation, now the Bureau of Immigration, in 1998.

Adaza was a leader of the Mindanao Alliance, a regional political organization opposed to the government of President Ferdinand Marcos. He subsequently became a critic of the administration of President Corazon Aquino.

== Education and legal career ==
Adaza studied pre-law and later law at the University of the Philippines. While a student, he served as editor-in-chief of the university's student newspaper, the Philippine Collegian, for two consecutive years. After qualifying as a lawyer, he practised in Manila before returning to Misamis Oriental.

== Political career ==
=== Mindanao Alliance and governorship ===
Adaza was one of the principal figures of the Mindanao Alliance, along with Reuben Canoy and Aquilino Pimentel Jr. The organization opposed the Marcos administration during the period of martial law. Political scientist Benedict Kerkvliet identified Adaza as a leading opposition spokesman in Mindanao during the early 1980s.

Adaza was elected governor of Misamis Oriental on January 30, 1980, and assumed office on March 3. Fernando Pacana Jr. was elected vice governor in the same election.

=== Batasang Pambansa ===
Adaza contested the May 14, 1984, parliamentary election and won a seat representing Misamis Oriental. He took his oath as a member of the Batasang Pambansa on July 19, 1984. Pacana subsequently assumed the governorship, resulting in a dispute over whether Adaza could simultaneously remain governor and serve in the national legislature.

In Adaza v. Pacana, decided on March 18, 1985, the Supreme Court held that the 1973 Constitution prohibited a member of the Batasang Pambansa from holding another government office. The court consequently upheld Pacana's succession to the governorship.

In 1985, Adaza participated in an opposition effort to impeach Marcos. After a Batasang Pambansa committee rejected the impeachment resolution, Adaza delivered the opposition's concluding speech before several opposition members walked out of the chamber. His service in the Batasang Pambansa ended when the legislature was abolished in March 1986.

=== Later political activity ===
Following the People Power Revolution, Adaza became a critic of the Aquino administration. In 1987, he joined the opposition Grand Alliance for Democracy slate as a candidate in the Philippine Senate election.

Adaza briefly served as commissioner of the Commission on Immigration and Deportation in 1998.

In March 2025, Adaza announced the formation of a national movement advocating changes to the Philippine political and economic system.

== Writing and legal discipline ==
Adaza wrote several books about Philippine politics and political figures, including Leaders from Marcos to Arroyo, Presidentiables and Emerging Upheavals, and Ideas, Principles and Lost Opportunities.

In 2015, the Supreme Court declared Adaza a delinquent member of the Integrated Bar of the Philippines for failing to comply with mandatory continuing legal education requirements. It suspended him from practising law for six months, or until he had completed the outstanding requirements and paid the applicable fees, whichever occurred later.
