= Compañero y Compañera =

Philippine television public affairs show

- Genre: Public affairs; Talk show
- Presented by: Rene Cayetano; Gel Santos-Relos; Tessie Tomas; Daniel Razon; Ted Failon; Ali Sotto; Angelique Lazo; Nanette Medved
- Country of origin: Philippines
- Original language: Tagalog

Production
- Production locations: ABS-CBN Broadcasting Center, Quezon City (1997–98); GMA Network Center, Quezon City (1998–2000); RPN Studios, Broadcast City, Quezon City (2000–01)
- Camera setup: Multiple-camera setup
- Running time: 90–105 minutes

Original release
- Network: ABS-CBN (March 16, 1997 – August 30, 1998); GMA Network (October 1998 – July 26, 2000); RPN (August 2000 – 2001)
- Release: March 16, 1997 – 2001

Compañero y Compañera (transl. male comrade and female comrade) is a Philippine television public affairs talk show broadcast by ABS-CBN, GMA Network and Radio Philippines Network. It ran from 1997 to 2001.

== Overview ==
=== DZMM (1994–97) ===
On June 24, 1994, Renato Cayetano, a lawyer and senior partner of the Ponce-Enrile, Cayetano, Bautista, Reyes law firm, often known as PECABAR, started hosting a regular segment for Relos Reports, a program hosted by Gel Santos-Relos on DZMM. This is when the idea for Compañero y Compañera was born. Cayetano and Relos spoke about the legal issues of the week's top news. Cayetano's appearance as a guest on the show also opened the stage for what would become one of his most enduring contributions: providing free legal assistance to listeners in need of information and guidance. The segment grew in popularity and eventually took up a significant daily portion of the program.

=== ABS-CBN (1997–98) ===
Compañero y Compañera began to air as a TV current affairs program on ABS-CBN from 1997 to 1998. The show's format in its first season was more magazine-style, beginning with a 20-minute dramatization of a case/problem issue. Cayetano would next go over the laws that would apply in the given circumstance. Cayetano and Relos would host the public service segment of the one-hour show in the second half. The program changed to a more talk-interactive style with less reenactment around the conclusion of the first season. There was a panel of guests who spoke with Cayetano and Relos about the current legal topic. Family, criminal, and civil law issues and circumstances were the most often discussed subjects. Additionally, Cayetano was available for inquiries from the live studio audience, who may also receive free legal counsel. The public service segment of the show also included emails and letters from viewers. Tessie Tomas, an actress and comedian, took Relos' position when she left for a parental and educational leave of absence. The final episodes of the show before it shifted to the GMA Network were hosted by broadcaster Daniel Razon in place of Cayetano, who was running for the Senate in 1998.

=== GMA Network (1998–2000) ===
Compañero y Compañera, which replaced Public Life with Randy David, went to GMA Network in October 1998 after spending a total of four years on ABS-CBN as a radio-television program. As his co-hosts, radio-TV personalities Ali Sotto and Angelique Lazo joined Cayetano, who was elected to the Senate months after the change. On July 26, 2000, the program's run on GMA came to an end, and Imbestigador took its place.

=== RPN (2000–01) ===
Compañero y Compañera moved to RPN in August 2000, with Nanette Medved serving as Cayetano's co-host. The network's run of the show lasted a year.

== Hosts ==
- Rene Cayetano (1997–2001)
- Gel Santos-Relos (1997)
- Tessie Tomas (1997–98)
- Daniel Razon (1997–98)
- Ted Failon (1997)
- Ali Sotto (1998–99)
- Angelique Lazo (1999–2000)
- Nanette Medved (2000–01)
