= Nelia Sancho =

Filipino beauty queen, activist, feminist

- Born: Nelia de los Reyes Sancho; August 30, 1951; Pandan, Antique, Philippines
- Died: September 1, 2022 (aged 71); Quezon City, Metro Manila, Philippines
- Height: 5 ft 6 in (168 cm)
- Spouse: Antonio "Tony" Manlunas Liao
- Children: 2
- Beauty pageant titleholder
- Title: Queen of the Pacific 1971
- Major competitions: Binibining Pilipinas 1969; (1st Runner-up)

Nelia Sancho (August 30, 1951 – September 1, 2022) was a Filipino women's rights activist and beauty queen. She was one of the co-founders of the Gabriela Women's Party.

Nelia was born in Antique to Rogelio Canimo Sancho Sr., a lawyer, and Rosario Martizano de los Reyes, a homemaker, but grew up in Caticlan, Aklan (her mother's hometown) and Pandan, Antique then Davao City. While studying at the University of the Philippines Diliman, Sancho joined Binibining Pilipinas 1969, finishing first runner-up to Gloria Diaz who will go on and win the first Miss Universe crown for the Philippines.

She earned her own international pageant title when she won Queen of the Pacific 1971 in Melbourne, Australia.

With some of her sorority sisters in the UP Sigma Delta Phi, she participated in the First Quarter Storm, the protests against human rights violations by then president Ferdinand Marcos. In 1973, Sancho was first arrested by state forces; then incarcerated again in 1976 as a political prisoner in Bicutan, Taguig. She was later released in 1978 after two and a half years due to humanitarian grounds after conceiving her firstborn child, Antonio Karlo. She then co-founded GABRIELA in 1984.

While she was with the underground movement to resist the brutality of martial law under Marcos, she was assigned as head of the finance committee of the Communist Party of the Philippines. In 1974, she met Antonio "Tony" Liao, a CPP commander for the Misamis front, leading the civil resistance in Mindanao. He will go on to become her husband and they will have two children together. After Marcos was unseated in 1986 due to the peaceful popular uprising People Power Revolution, Sancho ran for senator in 1987 and lost. During the late 1990s, Sancho led groups that advocated for the Filipina World War II comfort women survivors.

In the 2000s, she also helmed an NGO with United Nations observer status called Buhay Foundation for Women.

Together with its Secretary General and Program Coordinator, Natalie Kaye Ganipis; with Sancho as Board President – they evaluated the impact of anti-trafficking measures on migrant workers in the International Congress held in Bangkok, Thailand and in Bali, Indonesia by United Nations Development Program or UNDP and GAATW or Global Alliance Against Traffic in Women.

Social media posts of Anna Louise Balanquit and Natalie Kaye Ganipis both confirmed September 1, 2022 as the date of Sancho's passing. This was also announced by Gabriela Women's Party. She died of natural causes, believed to be complications of diabetes, multiple organ failure and recently acquired tuberculosis at her Quezon City home.

She is survived by her 2 children: a son, Karlo and a daughter, Anna. She has 5 grandchildren by them: Fiona, Thomas, Chloe, Ava, and Wayne Tony Scott. Her remains are inurned at Aeternitas Chapels and Columbarium.
