= Antonio Kho =

Antonio Kho may refer to:

- Antonio Kho (politician) (born 1958), Filipino civil engineer and politician
- Antonio Kho Jr. (born 1966), Filipino jurist
