= Joe Burgos =

Jose “Joe” Gacusano Burgos Jr. (January 4, 1941 - November 16, 2003) was a Filipino journalist, newspaper publisher, and press freedom advocate best known for establishing several alternative news media outlets which challenged the Marcos dictatorship - what has been called the "Mosquito Press."

He is the father of the disappeared activist Jonas Burgos and of film director JL Burgos.

He established the WE Forum in 1977 and Ang Pahayagang Malaya in 1983. He also published two other papers - Midday and Masa - at around this time.

Inter Press Service named him International Journalist of the Year in 1986, and the International Press Institute recognized him as one of its World Press Freedom Heroes of the 20th Century in 2000. His name is inscribed on the wall of remembrance of the Philippines' Bantayog ng mga Bayani, which honors the Martyrs and Heroes who fought the dictatorship of Ferdinand Marcos from 1965 to 1986.

Burgos died in 2003.

== See also ==
- Journalism during the Marcos dictatorship
