= Augusto Sanchez =

Augusto Sanchez may refer to the following:

- Augusto Sánchez (born 1983), Dominican cyclist
- Augusto Sanchez (lawyer) (1932–2003), Filipino lawyer and politician
- Luis Augusto Sánchez (1917–1981), Colombian chess player
