= Nilo Tayag =

Filipino revolutionary and activist

The Right Reverend Nilo Tayag
- Bishop
- Church: International Conference of Philippine Independent Catholic Churches of Jesus Christ (ICPICCJC)

Orders
- Ordination: 1989 (priesthood) by Manuel Lagasca Sr.
- Consecration: March 19, 1993 by Macario V. Ga, Armando L. de la Cruz, and Melvyn Acosta

Personal details
- Born: Nilo Salumbides Tayag; 1942 or 1943 (age 82–83) Porac, Pampanga
- Denomination: "Aglipayan sect" (not in communion with the Philippine Independent Church)
- Education: University of the Philippines Diliman; ICFI National Seminary
- Known for: Co-founding Kabataang Makabayan
- Notable work: "On Commitment"

Nilo Tayag is a Filipino bishop, social activist, and revolutionary. He is a bishop of the Philippine Independent Catholic Church and is an advocate for a revolutionary government in the Philippines

Tayag co-founded, along with Jose Maria Sison and others, the Maoist youth group Kabataang Makabayan ("Patriotic Youth") in 1964, which became the nucleus of the established Communist Party of the Philippines in 1968, and served as its Central Committee member. He was the group's national chairman until he was arrested on June 11, 1970, in Barrio Concepcion, San Pablo, Laguna. Detained along with Benito Tiamzon, Jesus Lava and other left-wing personalities at the Youth Rehabilitation Center in Fort Bonifacio, and later declaring support for the incumbent president Ferdinand Marcos, he was released in 1981 or 1982 after pleading guilty to the charge of subversion.

After being released from prison, Tayag undertook theology studies in the Iglesia Catolica Filipina Independiente (ICFI) National Seminary at Batac, Ilocos Norte (a splinter group from the Philippine Independent Church). In 1987, he ran for the Senate under the UPP-KBL ticket but lost. After losing the election, in January 1988, Tayag and other Marcos loyalists declared their exit from the Kilusang Bagong Lipunan party to form a new party called the Loyalist Party of the Philippines (LPP), of which Tayag was co-vice president with Pacifico de Leon. In 1989, his Church ordained him a priest, and by 1993 consecrated him as a bishop. He was a prominent supporter of Rodrigo Duterte during the latter's campaign for the Presidency and is a founding member of the "Democratic Front for Filipinism" and "Kilusang Pilipinismo", groups supporting Duterte's "revolution against illegal drugs, the oligarchs and the exploiters of the Filipino masses".

Tayag is a member of the UP Alpha Sigma fraternity, Philippine Guardians Brotherhood Inc., and Freemasonry.

== See also ==
- First Quarter Storm
- Jose Maria Sison
- Kabataang Makabayan
