= Rafael Recto =

Filipino sports shooter and politician (1931–2008)

Member of the Mambabatas Pambansa (Assemblyman) from Batangas
- In office 1984–1986
- Constituency: At-large

Personal details
- Born: Rafael Reyes Recto; November 6, 1931
- Died: March 17, 2008 (aged 76)
- Party: Nacionalista (1984–1992; 1993–2008)
- Other political affiliations: KBL (1992)
- Children: 3 (including Ralph)
- Parent: Claro M. Recto; Aurora Reyes
- Profession: Politician
- Sports career
- Sport: Sports shooting

Rafael Reyes Recto (November 6, 1931 – March 17, 2008) was a Filipino politician and sports shooter. He competed in the 25 metre pistol event at the 1972 Summer Olympics.

In August 1985, Recto signed an impeachment complaint against President Ferdinand Marcos, but soon disowned his signature and continued siding with the Marcoses.

In July 1986, Recto took part in a coup attempt led by Arturo Tolentino at the Manila Hotel against the Corazon Aquino administration, being named Tolentino's "justice minister". He is the father of Executive Secretary Ralph Recto.
