= Romeo Capulong =

Filipino human rights lawyer

Romeo T. Capulong (February 15, 1935 - September 16, 2012), sometimes nicknamed "Ka Romy" or "RTC", was a prominent Filipino human rights lawyer best known for his resistance against the Dictatorship of Ferdinand Marcos. He had been elected delegate for Nueva Ecija to the 1971 Philippine Constitutional Convention, becoming part of the convention's opposition faction. He was immediately arrested and became a political detainee when Marcos declared martial law in September 1972. Released a few years later due to pressure from international human rights adovocates, Capulong eventually managed to go into political exile in the United States. He founded the Public Interest Law Center (PILC) in 1989 and then the National Union of People's Lawyers in 1997. Capulong was also the chief legal counsel of the National Democratic Front during its peace talks with the Philippine government, although the peace talks had limited succes. He was also the general counsel of the Society of Ex-Detainees for Liberation against Detention and for Amnesty (SELDA) when it initiated the case that eventually became the landmark Maximo Hilao, et al. v. Estate of Ferdinand E. Marcos, which held Ferdinand Marcos Sr. Legally responsible for the human rights abuses which took place during his regime the Marcos dictatorship.

== See also ==
- Martial law under Ferdinand Marcos
