= Silvino Barsana Agudo =

Filipino businessman (1917–2010)

The Honorable Silvino Barsana Agudo
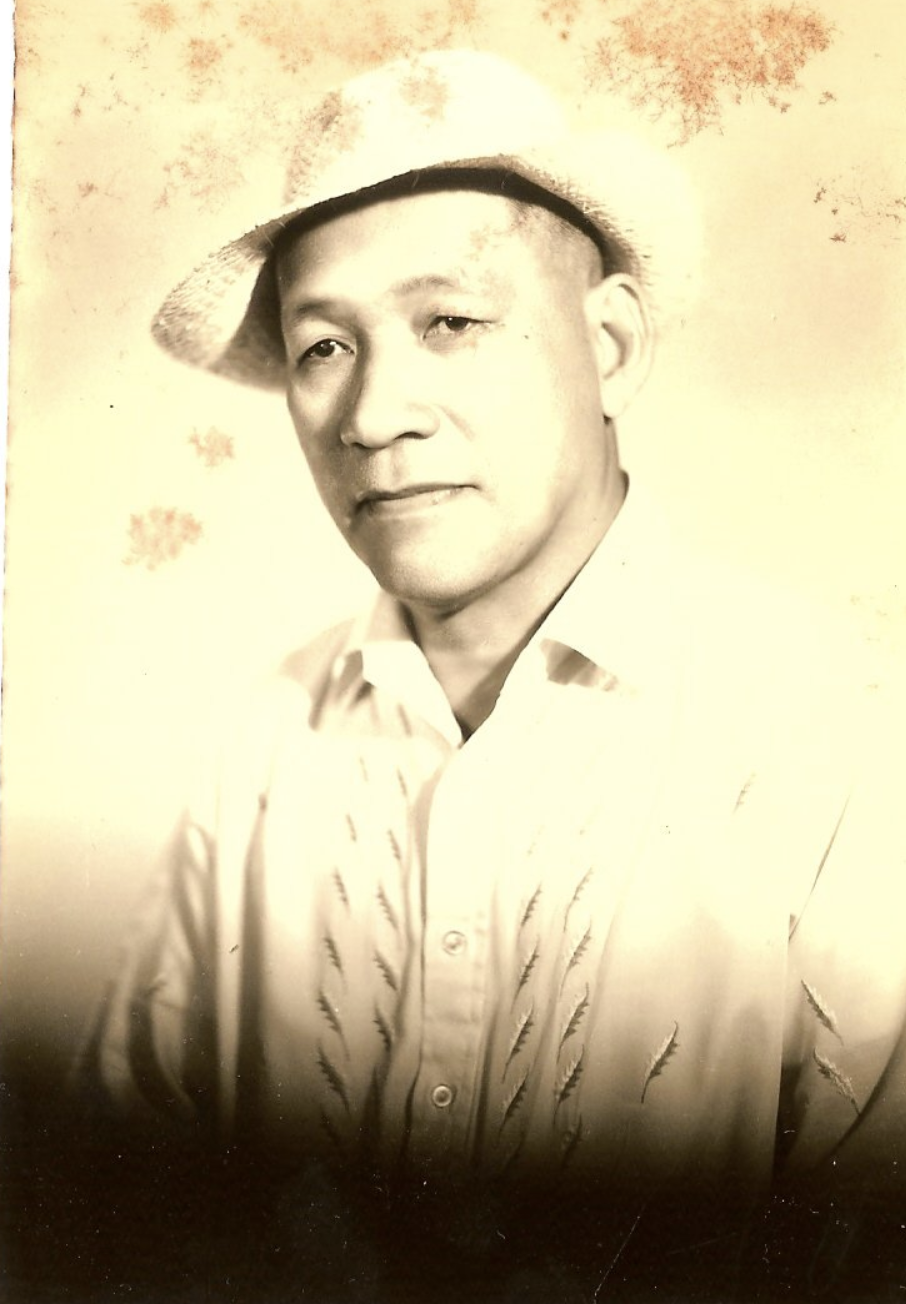

29th Governor of Batanes
- In office December 30, 1968 – December 30, 1971
- Preceded by: Eugenio Agudo
- Succeeded by: Simon Gato

Personal details
- Born: Silvino Artemio Barsana Agudo; September 12, 1917 Tuguegarao, Cagayan, Philippine Islands
- Died: December 17, 2010 (aged 93) Sacramento, California, United States
- Spouse: Honorata P. Arcilla
- Children: 7
- Parent(s): Pablo Agudo; Consolacion Barsana
- Education: University of Santo Tomas (BS)
- Occupation: Businessman, lawyer, politician
- Nickname(s): S.B., Binong

Silvino Artemio Barsana Agudo (September 12, 1917 – December 17, 2010), also known as S.B. or Binong, was a Filipino businessman, lawyer, World War II veteran, and public servant. He was the governor of Batanes province from 1968 to 1971.

== Early years ==
Silvino Barsana Agudo was born on September 12, 1917, in Tuguegarao, Cagayan. He was the third of seven children of Pablo Agudo, a farmer turned tailor who was the ninth of ten children, and Consolacion Castillejos Barsana, was one of the first pre-school / elementary teachers in Ivana, Batanes.

Agudo's siblings were Vicente Homobono Agudo (born November 14, 1907), Aurora Elisa Agudo (April 22, 1915 – 1949), Silvino Artenio Agudo (born September 12, 1917), Robustiano "Robust" Federico Agudo (born October 12, 1920), Ramon Agudo (September 2, 1922 – 1954), Daz Agudo (1923-1928; died from influenza) and Soccorro "Corring" Agudo (1925-1960).

Agudo's parents were natives of Ivana but later moved to mainland Luzon to search for a better livelihood. Silvino's father, Pablo, fished for arayu tuna and flying fish; he also grew "fertile but small crops" on Mount Matarem including tobacco, corn, and rice, and exported dried fish and dried garlic to Manila. Consequently, Pablo Agudo moved to Cagayan and established a tailor shop in the provincial capital Tuguegarao. His father's prospering business provided the opportunity for short vacations back to Ivana.

Agudo's mother, Consolacion, was born on December 27, 1882, in Ivana. Silvino and his siblings called their mother Nana and father Tata as children until adulthood. Consolacion was one of the first to be taught English when the Americans came and consequently became a pre-school kindergarten teacher by profession. Her father, Luciano Barsana, served as governor of Batanes.

As a young boy, Agudo often travelled to Batanes for vacations with his father and brothers Robustiano and Ramon. They would go fishing for dibang flying fish and arayu tuna with their father and were there in Batanes during the Japanese construction of the national road including the construction of the landmark 'Payhaysan' found on the road connecting Basco to Mahatao to Ivana.

Consolacion, besides taking care of six children, helped her husband's tailoring business and cooked food for the tailor shop staff. Agudo cared for his mother who suffered from tuberculosis, which eventually led to her death on May 7, 1930, in Tuguegarao when he was 13.

== Education ==
Agudo graduated from Cagayan National High School in Tuguegarao in March 1935.

Immediately, after his graduation Agudo's father made arrangements for him to go to Manila to pursue further studies. Six months later, his father died. His older brother Bono subsequently brought the rest of their siblings to Manila.

Agudo graduated with a bachelor's degree in commerce (which is now Business) with a major in accounting from the University of Santo Tomas. He passed the Certified Public Accountant Exam (CPA) the following year. Silvino also graduated from University of Santo Tomas University Civil Law in 1941 and passed the Bar of the Philippines on December 2, 1941, at 27 years of age. Silvino opened his own Law & Accounting firm located the historic Calvo Building, Suite 211, 60 Escolta Street, (Binondo), Manila Published by the Philippine Yearbook 1951-1952 Edition.

== World War II ==
Agudo was in Santa Cruz, Laguna for a court hearing when news of the outbreak of the Pacific War broke out on 8 December 1941. Returning to his house in Manila, he found that it was filled with expatriate Ivatans seeking shelter. Despite the conflict, Agudo hosted them until Batanes Congressman Vicente Agan informed him about a Japanese-sponsored boat that would take them back to Batanes with free passage.

During the course of the conflict, Agudo was drafted into the 7th Military Police Command and received military police training in Cavite, Rizal, and Nueva Ecija and was told his unit was to do service in Tokyo upon the surrender of the Japanese Imperial Army. However, the trip was cancelled by General Douglas MacArthur. For his service during the war, Agudo was decorated by the Basco Program of the Veterans Federation of the Philippines in 1967.

== Marriage and family life ==
Agudo married Honorata Arcilla in a civil ceremony in May 1949 and formally through the Catholic Church on December 10. They had 7 children namely: Consolacion, Aurora, Pablo, Regina, Beatriz, Maria Luisa, and Luningning.

== Legal career ==
Agudo presided as a defense lawyer in various criminal cases that reached the Supreme Court of the Philippines on behalf of defendants with limited resources prosecuted for murder and rape.

His law office, Agudo, Reyes, Estrella and Associates, was located in the Puzon Building in Quezon City.

Agudo also served as First Corporate Counsel for Cosmos Bottling Company, bottler for Pop Cola, Sarsi, and other local Philippine soft drink brands, and Leslie Corporation, manufacturer of Clover Chips and other local Philippine snack products. Additionally, he mentored rising talent, including hiring and training a young Diosdado Peralta, future Chief Justice of Supreme Court, to work in his law firm.

== Political career ==
=== Campaign for governor ===
As the 1967 mid-election approached President Ferdinand Marcos moved to ensure that his Nacionalista Party would be victorious by electing most of the Senators, Governors, and Mayors of the country. President Ferdinand Marcos asked Chairman Manuel "Maning" Agudo to choose Silvino as his candidate for governor of Batanes. Manuel Agudo's reputation was critically important to Silvino's endorsement to run for Governor because of his chairmanship of the Civil Service Board of Appeals, tenure as Congressman of Batanes (1958–1961), and service as administrative officer in the Office of the President in Malacañang Palace during the tenure of six Presidents of the Philippines, namely: José P. Laurel, Sergio Osmeña, Manuel Roxas, Elpidio Quirino, Ramon Magsaysay, and Carlos P. Garcia.

During this time Silvino Agudo was a successful law practitioner with many clients in the Filipino, American, Spanish, and Chinese communities. Precisely because of his success in law practice, he was induced to run for Governor. He participated in the Provincial Convention in Batanes and then boarded a Philippine Navy boat to Basco in August 1967.

Agudo's trip was delayed by a typhoon but when he arrived in Basco, he described the town as a "gog." Manuel and Renee Agudo rented a house to stay and Silvino stayed in the house of his uncle, Jose Barona, and aunt Bilay (Severa) Barsana Barona, sister of Silvino's mother.

Two days after his arrival, the Nacionalista Party Convention was held on Tukon Hill. Nominations were made and three were nominated for Governor: Jose Aceron of Ivana, Tobias Abad of Basco, and Atty. Silvino Barsana Agudo of Ivana. After the nominations, Jose Martinez, Agudo's campaign manager, talked to delegates in each town without consulting jim. After the short campaigning, voting was done by secret ballot. At the end of the day, Renee Agudo, Chairwoman of the Batanes Nacionalista Party announced the winning party candidates: Agudo as its gubernatorial candidate, with Tobias Abad as his running mate. Afterwards, Agudo and other official candidates took the same Philippine Navy Boat back to Manila.

Renee Agudo reported to Marcos and Senator Gil Puyat the results of the convention. Within a month Marcos invited all the candidates for governor and city mayor to Malacañang for individual conversations with him. To everyone's surprise, President Marcos knew all candidates' names by heart. All candidates were also brought into a room filled with 6-foot piles of legal-sized brown envelopes. The President's aid gave one envelope to each candidate. However, Agudo was pulled aside and given a second envelope which was to be for the six candidates for mayor in Batanes. Agudo took a taxi home and examined the contents of the brown envelopes – each containing US$10,000 in $10 bills or $20,000 in all. He subsequently bought a new refrigerator and distributed and spent the rest of the money for provisions for his campaign.

=== Governor of Batanes ===
During his term (1968–1971), Agudo supported the preservation and promotion of Batanes culture through various initiatives including research of archaic Itbayaten numeral writing systems.

=== Suzuki Boys ===
Agudo presided over Batanes during one of its most tumultuous times and played an instrumental role in preventing election fraud and protecting Ivatan people from armed thugs known as Suzuki Boys for the branded motorcycles they rode on.

During the 1969 election, there were five candidates for the lone congressional seat of the province. The important candidates were Renee Agudo (Nacionalista), former Congressmen Jorge Abad, and Rufino Antonio Jr. and Independent who was affiliated with the Nacionalistas and was a businessman from Metro Manila who opened a Suzuki brand motorcycle dealership in the province.)

Weeks before the 1969 elections, about 100 non-residents landed in Basco and scattered in the six towns of the province. Crates also landed in Basco. In late October, as an effort to maintain security of the island, Governor Agudo instructed Provincial Commander of the Philippine Constabulary (PC), Captain Fulgencio Albano, to collect licensed firearms from the residents "for verification." Furthermore, he advised the PC to search airport passengers and their luggage for firearms.

On November 9, Philippine Airlines suspended flights to Basco after several privately owned planes, including light aircraft, a helicopter and a Douglas DC-3 blocked the runway, forcing the PAL plane that carried Ivatan voters from Manila to turn back.

On November 10, a day before the elections, telegraph communications from Basco through the Bureau of Telecommunications and Station and Radio Communications of the Philippines Incorporated (RCPI) went dead. Armed goons had allegedly destroyed all private and government wireless facilities and drove away operators of the telecoms and RCPI stations; an operator of the weather bureau was reportedly tear gassed. The equipment was destroyed, however, some operators who fled to the mountains used a transmitter to report "goon activities" and request the Albano and President Marcos for aid. Later during the night of November 10, the Bureau of Public Highways compound was raided and vehicles were destroyed.

Even before this, on October 24, Ivatans in Manila held a meeting in Quezon City and decided to ask the PC and the Commission on Elections (Comelec) to relieve Captain Albano from his post. On November 2, Albano was replaced by Major Benjamin Amante. On November 7, Major Amante and Congressman Roque Ablan Jr. of Ilocos Norte flew to Basco in Ablan's plane. However, Amante stayed only a few days then left Basco before the elections. The PC Officer in charge was a Captain Velasco.

On election day, the roads leading to the six towns of Batanes were barricaded by checkpoints manned by armed thugs. Governor Agudo and his party making tours of the towns were turned back at one of the checkpoints and warned if they proceeded they might be ambushed. An American Peace Corps Volunteer, Larry Jones, was given six hours to surrender photographs of goons terrorizing voters at precincts.

Three days after the elections, Batanes was one of the few provinces from which results of the congressional elections were not heard. In the past elections, which were peaceful, results were known by the next day, there being only less than 5,000 votes to count. In Manila, Agudo's wife, Honorata, asked Executive Secretary Ernesto Maceda to assign security men to her house near Quezon City because suspicious looking men were loitering near their home.

In less than a week after the elections, residents of Batanes, were up in arms against the takeover of their islands by thugs. Reports of the terror that gripped Batanes filtered to Manila several days after the counting finished, prompting them to call public attention to the "rape of the ballot" in the province.

On January 16, 1970, President Ferdinand Marcos acknowledged a report from Governor Agudo stating "three of the suspected malefactors in connection with the November 11 polls had escaped by private plane (Official Gazette of the Republic of the Philippines)." Eventually, the Supreme Court decrying the "rape of democracy" in the province, annulled the victory of Marcos' candidate, Rufino Antonio Jr. in 1970 in favor of his rival, Jorge Abad.

== Batanes Bicentennial Commission ==
Governor Agudo remained active in provincial affairs into his retired days as President of the Batanes Bicentennial Commission in 1983.

In May 1983, on the initiative of the Dominican Fathers in Santo Domingo Church in Quezon City, a Bicentennial Commission was created to plan the celebration of the 200th Anniversary of the Christianization of Batanes and establishment of a centralized civil government therein. (In 1773, two missionaries from the Dominican Order from Tuguegarao landed in Ivana and put up a church. Ten years later in June 1783, civil government was established in Basco.)

The Bicentennial Commission was composed of Ivatans from Manila invited by the Fathers. The Fathers consulted Engineer Anastacio Agan, former Congressmen from Batanes and at that time incumbent Quezon City Engineer. Agan was also the structural engineer who built the Santo Domingo Church. He was assisted in the job of construction of the church by Engineer Ruperto Agudo. The assembly of Ivatans who were invited to form the Commission elected Agudo as its President.

The Bicentennial Anniversary was celebrated in two places, one in the Aquinas School at Sanctuario de Santo Cristo at Blumentritt Road, San Juan, Metro Manila and the other was held in Basco, Batanes under the joint auspices of the Provincial Government and the Bishop of Batanes Msgr. Mario Baltazar O.P. Agudo, as President of the Commission led both occasions.

== In popular culture ==
Agudo's YouTube videos recorded by his grandchildren, Patrick and Caroline Agudo Waterman, highlighted him singing native Ivatan songs, "IVASAY KAMOSAWEN" on YouTube and "YAHES MO DU VITUGEN" on YouTube. At the age of 91, Silvino Barsana Agudo's folk renditions gained the attention of the Ivatan diaspora.

== Death ==
Agudo died at the age of 93 years old on December 17, 2010, in Sacramento, California. He was accompanied on his deathbed by his daughters Gina and Lulu, and grandson, Patrick. He was buried with his wife Honorata and daughter Nining at St. Mary Cemetery and Funeral Center in Sacramento.
