= Grand Alliance for Democracy =

Philippine political coalition of opposition in 1987

- Founder: Vicente Puyat
- Founded: February 1987
- Dissolved: 1994
- Merger of: Liberal (Kalaw wing); Nacionalista (Cayetano wing); Partido Nacionalista ng Pilipinas; Mindanao Alliance; Christian Social Democratic Party; KBL; Muslim Federal Party; UNIDO (Espina wing)
- Split from: Lakas ng Bayan
- Merged into: Gabay Bayan

The Grand Alliance for Democracy (GAD) was a political multi-party electoral alliance during the 1987 Philippine legislative election. The coalition opposed the policies of incumbent president Corazon Aquino and her Lakas ng Bayan (Laban; transl. People's Power) coalition, while severing ties with ousted president Ferdinand Marcos. The coalition consisted mostly of defectors from the Kilusang Bagong Lipunan (New Society Movement), Marcos' political party, the Nacionalista Party and the United Nationalist Democratic Organization, the coalition that supported Aquino during the 1986 presidential election.

== History ==
Upon establishment in February 1987, the Grand Alliance for Democracy was led by chairman Vicente Puyat, with former assemblyman Rene Cayetano, then head of the Nacionalista Party (Roy wing), serving as campaign manager.

In the Senate election, Laban won 22 of the 24 seats, with only San Juan mayor Joseph Estrada winning a seat outright for GAD; former Minister of Defense Juan Ponce Enrile, one of the leaders of the People Power Revolution that ousted Marcos, was eventually declared the winner of the last Senate seat, bringing the winning GAD candidates to two. Estrada later defected to the Liberal Party, one of the parties making up Laban, resulting in Enrile becoming the sole member of the minority bloc in the Senate. Enrile himself would also resign from GAD in February 1988 amidst unification talks among the splintered Nacionalista Party factions.

Candidates running under the GAD name won two seats in the House of Representatives elections, although its member parties such as the Nacionalista and the KBL won 4 and 11 seats, respectively. Candidates running under GAD-affiliated parties also won seats.

On December 23, 1987, the GAD Governing Council held a reorganization meeting, with vice chairman for Luzon Francisco Tatad thus named as its new chairman, former assemblyman Wilson Gamboa as its new secretary general, and Vicente Magsaysay as its new deputy secretary general. The chairmanship was planned to rotate among the regional vice chairmen, with Tatad to be succeeded by Rene Espina and Abul Khayr Alonto, the vice chairmen for Visayas and Mindanao respectively. In 1992, GAD entered into a coalition with the Nationalist People's Coalition (NPC) during the 1992 elections, wherein Tatad ran as an NPC senatorial candidate and won. By November 1993, however, the coalition was dissolved by Tatad upon quitting the NPC. On June 3, 1994, Tatad left GAD to join the Laban ng Demokratikong Pilipino.

In December 1997, GAD was reconstituted as the Gabay Bayan by Senator Tatad in order to support his presidential candidacy in the 1998 election, but upon deciding to run as Miriam Defensor Santiago's running mate instead in February 1998, Tatad had Gabay Bayan form a coalition with Santiago's People's Reform Party (PRP).

== Congressional results ==
Congress of the Philippines
House of Representatives			Senate			
Year	Seats won	Result	Year	Seats won	Ticket	Result
1987 (Note: Only 1 is directly affiliated with GAD, as 4 seats are from Nacionalista while 11 seats are from KBL)	16 / 214	Lakas ng Bayan plurality	1987	2 / 24	Grand Alliance for Democracy	Lakas ng Bayan win 22/24 seats

== See also ==
- Nationalist People's Coalition, the political party that led the opposition coalition during the 1995 elections.
- Laban ng Makabayang Masang Pilipino (LAMMP), the opposition coalition during the 1998 elections.
- Puwersa ng Masa, the opposition coalition during the 2001 elections.
- Koalisyon ng Nagkakaisang Pilipino (KNP), the opposition coalition during the 2004 elections.
- Genuine Opposition (GO), the opposition coalition during the 2007 elections.
- United Nationalist Alliance (UNA), the opposition coalition during the 2013 elections.
