= Vicente Millora =

Filipino politician and lawyer (1933–2020)

Vicente D. Millora (February 22, 1933 – July 9, 2020) was the former chairman of the Kilusang Bagong Lipunan (KBL) party in the Philippines. He previously served as the National President of the Integrated Bar of the Philippines.

In January 1988, Millora and other Ferdinand Marcos loyalists declared their exit from the KBL to form a new party called the Loyalist Party of the Philippines (LPP), of which Millora was president. Millora, however, had returned to KBL as its Secretary General when former first lady Imelda Marcos declared her candidacy in the 1992 Philippine presidential election on December 30, 1991.

On July 9, 2020, Millora died due to renal failure aged 87.

== In media ==
In 2023, Millora was portrayed by Rez Cortez in the biographical film Imelda Papin: The Untold Story.
