= Rene Cayetano =

Filipino lawyer, television presenter, journalist, and politician

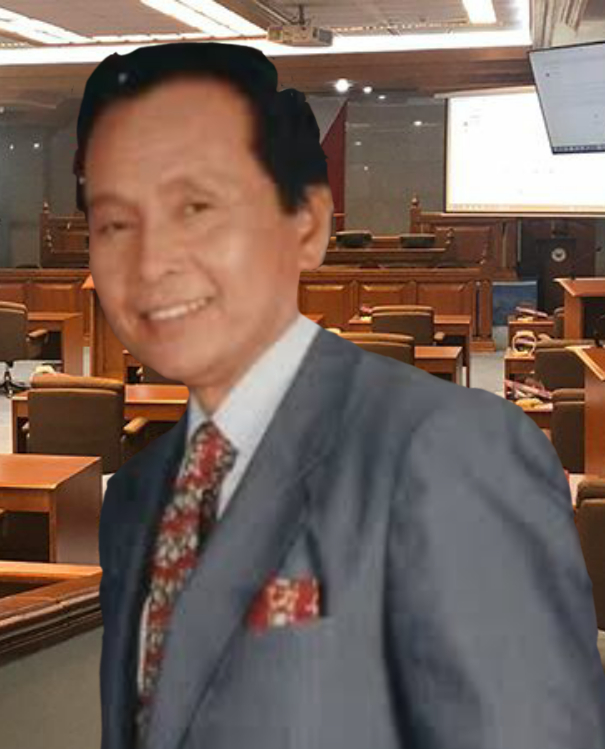

Senate Minority Leader
- In office February 9, 2001 – June 30, 2001
- Preceded by: Teofisto Guingona Jr.
- Succeeded by: Nene Pimentel

Senator of the Philippines
- In office June 30, 1998 – June 25, 2003

Member of the Batasang Pambansa from Taguig–Pateros–Muntinlupa
- In office June 30, 1984 – March 25, 1986

Personal details
- Born: Renato Luna Cayetano; December 12, 1934 San Carlos, Pangasinan, Philippine Islands, U.S.
- Died: June 25, 2003 (aged 68) Muntinlupa, Philippines
- Party: Lakas (1998–2003)
- Other political affiliations: KBL (1984–1986); Nacionalista (1986–1998)
- Spouse: Sandra Schramm
- Children: 4, including Pia, Alan, Lino
- Education: University of the Philippines Diliman (BA, LLB); University of Michigan (MPA, LLM, SJD)

Renato "Rene" Luna Cayetano (Tagalog: [rɛˈnɛ kajɛˈtano]; December 12, 1934 – June 25, 2003), commonly known as Compañero, was a Filipino lawyer, television presenter, journalist, and politician. He served in the Regular Batasang Pambansa, representing the lone district of the Metro Manila municipalities of Taguig, Pateros and Muntinlupa, from 1984 until its abolition in 1986. He then served as a Senator from 1998 to 2003. He briefly served as the minority leader of the Senate in 2001 towards the end of the 11th Congress. He also hosted the television program Compañero y Compañera from 1997 to 2001.

He was the father of politicians Pia, Alan Peter, and Lino Cayetano.

== Early life and education ==
Cayetano was born on December 12, 1934, in San Carlos, Pangasinan, Philippines. He was the eldest son of mechanic Pedro Santiago Cayetano of Marilao, Bulacan and public school teacher Julianna Cabrera-Luna of Pateros, Rizal.

He graduated from Pateros Elementary School and Rizal High School. He earned his bachelor's degree in Political Science and Bachelor’s of Laws degree at the University of the Philippines Diliman and three graduate degrees - Master of Public Administration, Master of Laws, and Doctor of Juridical Science at the University of Michigan in Ann Arbor, Michigan.

== Legal career ==
Rene Cayetano was a founding partner of the Cayetano, Sebastian, Dado and Cruz Law Office, chairman of the House of Delegates and governor of the Integrated Bar of the Philippines, and, with Juan Ponce Enrile, co-founder of the Pecabar (Ponce Enrile Cayetano Bautista & Reyes) Law Offices.

Cayetano was active in private law practice, handling many sensational cases pro bono. He acted as private prosecutor in the Pepsi Paloma rape case, the Manila Film Festival scandal on behalf of Mayor Alfredo Lim, co-defense counsel for Luis Beltran in the libel case filed against him by former President Corazon Aquino, and defense counsel for Enrile in a Supreme Court case where he successfully argued that Enrile's charge of "rebellion complexed with murder" was a non-existent crime. Most famous of these cases was the Vizconde case where all the accused were found guilty and sentenced to life imprisonment.

To reach a wider audience, he hosted the public service program Compañero y Compañera alongside Gel Santos-Relos in the 1990s. Initially airing on the radio station DZMM from 1994 to 1997, it offered free legal advice to television viewers and radio listeners.

== Political career ==
After his 1984 election as an assemblyman to the Regular Batasang Pambansa, he was appointed Deputy Minister for Trade and Industry Administrator of the Export Processing Zone Authority (now Philippine Export Zone Authority). In November 1985, he filed a resolution expressing opposition to the United States' Textile and Apparel Trade Enforcement Act of 1985, a bill seeking to limit textile imports from several non-European countries, calling it "plain and pure discrimination" and stating that "this will affect an estimated 200,000 workers, 440 garment companies and a possible loss of 434 million dollars in the Philippines. Although the bill was passed by the US Congress, it was ultimately vetoed by President Ronald Reagan in December 1985.

In August 1986, Cayetano became acting secretary general of the revived Nacionalista Party, with Rafael "Nono" Palmares maintaining his position as party head. However, by early 1987, the party had splintered into three different factions, with his wing being named after the late senator Jose Roy and becoming largely composed of former members of the Kilusang Bagong Lipunan (KBL). Around this time, Cayetano was considered to be the closest political associate of Juan Ponce Enrile. Both Cayetano and Enrile accused the newly-formed political party of Bagong Alyansang Makabayan, the "Partido ng Bayan", to be a front for communists, with Cayetano stating that it is "no more than a clone of the Communisty [sic] Party, seeking to win power through the ballots, while leaving the CPP to carry on its program the use of violence and armed struggle."

During the 1987 Senate election, Cayetano served as the campaign manager of the Grand Alliance for Democracy, a coalition of opposition groups that included his wing of the Nacionalista Party, the Kalaw wing of the Liberal Party, and the KBL.

In February 1996, he was appointed chief presidential counsel by President Fidel V. Ramos, succeeding Antonio Carpio. According to JB Baylon, Young Nacionalistas secretary general in the 1980s, Cayetano's acceptance of the appointment resulted in the eventual deterioration of his friendship with Enrile. In recognition of his efforts in crime prevention and improvement of the criminal justice system, he was named Vice Chairman of the Presidential Anti-Crime Commission (PACC).

In 1998, President Ramos conferred on Cayetano the Legion of Honor; and the Philippine Jaycees chose him as TOYM finalist in the field of law. Earlier, the Order of the Purple Feather of the UP College of Law adopted him as member and the Philippine Jaycees named him as outstanding Jaycees president. The University of Michigan and Princeton University in United States gave him various grants. He also received a doctorate in humanities, honoris causa, by Misamis University in 1997.

=== Legislator ===
In May 1998, Cayetano was elected senator, garnering the second highest number of votes. The freshman senator became the Chairman of the Committee on Justice and Human Rights and Vice-Chairman of the Committee on Public Order and Illegal Drugs. He is also the Minority Leader of the Commission on Appointments and was a member of the Judicial Bar Council and BIR Oversight Committee. Before the 11th Congress adjourned February 9, he became the Senate Minority Leader Floor Leader, making him an ex-officio member of all Senate committees.

In his first term as a lawmaker, Senator Cayetano has filed a number of Senate bills and resolutions aimed at speeding up the dispensation of justice for criminal cases and in curbing graft and corruption. Through his efforts, the Supreme Court issued Administrative Order 51-96 designating special criminal courts in Metro Manila and other cities to hear cases involving heinous crimes and finish the trial within 60 days. A strong exponent of the rights of the consuming public, he filed Resolution No. 579 and fought for the ban on collection of parking fees by shopping malls. The Senate Committee on Commerce and Industry jointly with the Justice and Human Rights Committee found the collection of parking fees, and the provisions of the waiver of liability, stated in parking tickets are illegal.

He authored and co-authored landmark pieces of legislation during the 11th Congress which includes RA 8972 –"An Act to Facilitate the Acquisition of Right-of-Way, Site or Location for National Government Infrastructure Projects and for Other Purposes"; RA 8975 – An act to Ensure the Expeditious Implementation and Completion of Government Infrastructure Projects by prohibiting Lower Courts from Issuing a Temporary Restraining Orders, Preliminary Injunctions or Preliminary Mandatory Injunctions", RA 8799 – The Securities Regulation Code; RA 8749 "An Act providing for a Comprehensive Air Pollution Control Policy, and For Other Purposes (Clean Air Act); RA 8792 – "An Act Providing for and Electronic Commerce Law and for Other Purposes (E-Commerce Law) RA 9139 – "Administrative Naturalization Law of 2000"; RA 9136 – Electronic Power Industry Reform Act of 2201" and RA 9006 – The Fair Elections Act.

He was also responsible for Republic Act 9048 aimed at correcting clerical and typographical errors in an entry in personal legal documents as the city or municipality civil register level.

In January 2001, during the impeachment trial of former President Estrada, Cayetano was one of the ten senator-judges who voted for the opening of a second envelope of bank documents alleged to contain incriminating evidence against the president. The resulting narrow vote against it led to a walkout by the ten senators and the prosecution team, triggering the EDSA II protest movement that led to the ousting of President Estrada.

He was the Chair of the Senate Committee on Education, Arts and Culture, and the Senate Committee on Energy for the 12th Congress.

== Death ==
Cayetano peacefully died from the complications of abdominal cancer and liver cancer on June 25, 2003, at his home in Ayala Alabang, Muntinlupa. He is buried at the Garden of Memories Memorial Park in his hometown of Pateros. In 2005, the school "Senator Renato "Companero" Cayetano Memorial Science and Technology High School" was built in memory of him.

== Legacy ==
Several educational institutions were named after Cayetano.

- Rene L. Cayetano Memorial School - Barangay Maligaya, Mariveles, Bataan
- Rene Cayetano Elementary School - Patay Rd, Barangay 176-D, Bagong Silang, Caloocan
- Rene Cayetano Elementary School (Gabriela Silang Elementary School Annex I) - Package 5, Barangay 176-D, Bagong Silang, Caloocan
- Compañero Rene Cayetano Foundation, Inc. - NDC Bldg, 116 Tordesillas, Makati
- Senator Renato "Compañero" Cayetano Memorial Science and Technology High School - Taguig

== Personal life ==
Rene Cayetano was married to Sandra Schramm, an American kindergarten teacher and writer from Ann Arbor, Michigan. They had four children:

- Pilar Juliana ("Pia", born March 22, 1966), with four children: Gabriel (passed away on 2001), Lucas, Maxine, Nadine
- Alan Peter (born October 28, 1970), married to Ma. Laarni Lopez
- Rene Carl ("Ren Ren", born July 31, 1973), married with two children
- Lino Edgardo (born January 4, 1978), married to Fille Cainglet, with three children

== See also ==
- List of Philippine legislators who died in office
