= Kilusang Bagong Lipunan =

Political party founded by Ferdinand Marcos

New Society Movement Kilusang Bagong Lipunan
- Abbreviation: KBL; KBLNNL
- President: Vacant
- Chairman: Imelda Marcos (emerita)
- Secretary-General: Joeme Erroba
- Founder: Ferdinand Marcos
- Founded: February 4, 1978; 48 years ago
- Split from: Nacionalista Party; Liberal Party
- Headquarters: 3rd Floor Narsan Bldg. West 4th, Brgy. West Triangle, Quezon City Quezon City
- Ideology: Conservatism; Anti-communism; Economic nationalism; Factions: Libertarianism; 1978–1986: Authoritarianism; Neoliberalism; Developmentalism; Keynesianism (Note: Not ideological but some keynesian economic policies in practice.)
- Political position: Right-wing
- National affiliation: UniTeam (2021–2024); GO (2007); KNP (2004)
- Colors: Blue, white, red, and yellow
- Senate: 0 / 24
- House of Representatives: 0 / 316
- Provincial Governors: 0 / 82
- Provincial Vice Governors: 0 / 82
- Provincial Board Members: 0 / 82

The Kilusang Bagong Lipunan (KBL; English: New Society Movement), formerly named the Kilusang Bagong Lipunan ng Nagkakaisang Nacionalista, Liberal, at iba pa (KBLNNL; English: New Society Movement of United Nationalists, Liberals, et cetera), is a right-wing political party in the Philippines. It was first formed in 1978 as an umbrella coalition of parties supporting President Ferdinand Marcos for the Interim Batasang Pambansa (the unicameral parliament) and served as his political vehicle during his 20-year rule. It was reorganized as a political party in 1986, and is considered among the furthest to the right of the political spectrum among active parties after Marcos' ouster.

Since 1986, the KBL has contested most national and local elections in the Philippines, but has retained only a single seat in the House of Representatives in Ilocos Norte, formerly held by former first lady Imelda Marcos until 2019.

== Establishment and ideology ==
The ideological roots of the "Bagong Lipunan" ("new society") concept can be traced to one Marcos' rationalizations for the declaration of Martial Law in September 23, 1972. In his rhetoric, Marcos contended that a system of "constitutional authoritarianism" was necessary in order to "reform society" and create a "new society" under his authority.

Six years after the declaration of Martial Law, Marcos adopted this rhetoric and used the phrase as the name of the umbrella coalition of administration parties running in the 1978 Philippine parliamentary election. The coalition retained the name when it was reorganized as a political party in 1986.

=== Splinter factions after the People Power Revolution ===
After the 1986 People Power Revolution ended Ferdinand Marcos' 21 years in power, he, his family and key followers fled to Hawaii. Marcos' party machinery quickly began to break into numerous factions, the most successful of which were Blas Ople's Partido Nacionalista ng Pilipinas, a reorganized Nacionalista Party led by Rafael Palmares and Renato Cayetano after the death of Senator Jose Roy, and a reorganized Kilusang Bagong Lipunan led by Nicanor Yñiguez.

By the time of the 1987 Philippine constitutional plebiscite, the reconstituted KBL under Yñiguez was the party furthest to the right among the rightwing political parties of the mid-1980s, remaining loyal to Marcos' authoritarian ideology in contrast to the Partido Nacionalista ng Pilipinas, which took a conservative centrist stance, and the Palmares wing of the Nacionalista party and the Kalaw wing of the Liberal Party which took center-right stances.

=== 2009 party division ===
Former logo of KBL

By 2007, KBL started to strengthen their political power, and was expected to merge with the founder's former party, Nacionalista. KBL chairman Vicente Millora advocated for a two-party system return, stating that the KBL is willing to merge with Nacionalista if the two-party system is revived.

On November 20, 2009, the KBL forged an alliance with the Nacionalista Party (NP) between Bongbong Marcos and NP Chairman Senator Manny Villar at the Laurel House in Mandaluyong. Bongbong was later on removed as a member by the KBL National Executive Committee on November 29. As such, the NP broke its alliance with the KBL due to internal conflicts within the party, though Marcos remained part of the NP Senatorial line-up.

== Electoral candidacy history ==
=== Candidates for the 2010 Philippine general election ===
- Vetellano Acosta (disqualified) – Presidential Candidate (lost)
- Jay Sonza – Vice Presidential Candidate (lost)
- Senatorial slate:
  1. Alma Lood (lost)
  2. Hector Villanueva (lost)
  3. Shariff Ibrahim Albani (lost)
  4. Dodong Maambong (lost)
  5. Nanette Espinosa (lost)

=== Candidates for the 2016 Philippine Senate election ===
- Jaiwie Peredes (lost) (Note: Under the presidential ticket of Miriam Defensor Santiago.)

=== Candidates for the 2019 Philippine Senate election ===
- Maria Cabintoy (lost) (Note: Under the ticket of Katipunan ng Demokratikong Pilipino.)

=== Candidates for the 2022 Philippine Senate election ===
- Nino Villamor (lost) (Note: Under the presidential ticket of Bongbong Marcos.)

=== Candidates for the 2025 Philippine Senate election ===
- Relly Jose Jr. (Note: Didn't join any ticket.)

== Notable members ==
=== Past ===
- Rodolfo B. Albano, Jr. — (1987-1995; moved to Lakas-CMD in 1995) former Representative of 1st District of Isabela
- Alejandro Almendras — former Member of Interim Batasang Pambansa from Southern Mindanao and Regular Batasang Pambansa from Davao del Sur's at-large district
- Helena Benitez — former Member of Interim Batasang Pambansa from Region IV-A and Regular Batasang Pambansa from Cavite
- Conrado M. Estrella III — (1987-1992; moved to Nationalist People's Coalition in 1992) former Representative of 6th District of Pangasinan
- Jaime C. Laya — 5th Governor of the Bangko Sentral ng Pilipinas, 1st Action Officer of Intramuros Administration, former Minister of Education, Culture, and Sports, Mambabatas Pambansa of Interim Batasang Pambansa from Minister of Budget and Management, Minister of Budget and Management
- Bongbong Marcos — (moved to Nacionalista Party in 2009, then to Partido Federal ng Pilipinas in 2021) former Vice Governor and Governor of Ilocos Norte, Representative of 2nd District of Ilocos Norte, former Senator (2010-2016) and the incumbent President of the Philippines (2022–present).
- Imee Marcos — (moved to Nacionalista Party) Senator, former Governor of Ilocos Norte, Representative of 2nd District of Ilocos Norte
- Estelito Mendoza — former Solicitor General of the Philippines, Governor of Pampanga, Mambabatas Pambansa (Assemblyman) of Interim Batasang Pambansa from Region III, and Minister of Justice
- Benjamin Romualdez - 10th Governor of Leyte, Ambassador of the Philippines to the United States, and Member of Interim Batasang Pambansa from Region VIII and Regular Batasang Pambansa from Leyte
- Carlos P. Romulo- former Minister of Foreign Affairs and Member of Interim Batasang Pambansa from Region IV-A
- Chavit Singson — Former Governor of Ilocos Sur
- Cesar Virata — 4th Prime Minister of the Philippines, 3rd Director-General of National Economic and Development Authority, former Minister of Finance, and Mambabatas Pambansa (Assemblyman) of Interim Batasang Pambansa from Region IV-A and Regular Batasang Pambansa from Cavite
- Rolando Abadilla — former military officer served as Vice Governor of Ilocos Norte
- Orlando Dulay — 3rd Governor of Quirino

=== Present ===
- Remy Albano — Vice Governor of Apayao
- Raymond Bagatsing – Manila vice mayoral candidate (2022), actor
- Roberto "Amay Bisaya" Reyes Jambongana – Bohol gubernatorial candidate (2019), comedian
- Jerry Dalipog — Governor of Ifugao
- Larry Gadon – secretary for poverty alleviation, senatorial candidate (2016, 2019 and 2022), former lawyer; pushed for the impeachment of former Chief Justice Maria Lourdes Sereno
- Efren Rafanan Sr.- Provincial Board Member of Ilocos Sur

== Electoral performance ==
=== Presidential and vice presidential elections ===
Year	Presidential election			Vice presidential election		
Year	Candidate	Vote share	Result	Candidate	Vote share	Result
1981	Ferdinand Marcos	88.02%	Ferdinand Marcos (KBL)	Vice presidency abolished		
1986	Ferdinand Marcos	53.62%	Disputed; See article for details	Arturo Tolentino	50.65%	Disputed; See article for details
1992	Imelda Marcos	10.32%	Fidel Ramos (Lakas–NUCD)	Vicente Magsaysay	3.43%	Joseph Estrada (NPC)
1998	Imelda Marcos	Withdraw	Joseph Estrada (LAMMP–PMP)	None (Note: Endorsed the candidacy of Edgardo Angara of LAMMP–LDP who lost.)		Gloria Macapagal Arroyo (Lakas–NUCD)
1998	None (Note: Endorsed the candidacy of Joseph Estrada of LAMMP–PMP who won.)		Joseph Estrada (LAMMP–PMP)	None		Gloria Macapagal Arroyo (Lakas–NUCD)
2004	None (Note: Endorsed the candidacy of Fernando Poe Jr. of KNP who lost.)		Gloria Macapagal Arroyo (Lakas–CMD)	None (Note: Endorsed the candidacy of Loren Legarda of KNP who lost.)		Noli de Castro (Independent)
2010	Vetallano Acosta (Note: Acosta was disqualified from the presidential race.)	0.48%	Benigno Aquino III (Liberal)	Jay Sonza	0.18%	Jejomar Binay (PDP–Laban)
2016	None (Note: Endorsed the candidacy of Miriam Defensor Santiago of PRP who lost.)		Rodrigo Duterte (PDP–Laban)	None (Note: Endorsed the candidacy of Bongbong Marcos an independent who lost.)		Leni Robredo (Liberal)
2022	None (Note: Endorsed the candidacy of Bongbong Marcos of Partido Federal ng Pilipinas who won.)		Bongbong Marcos (Partido Federal)	None (Note: Endorsed the candidacy of Sara Duterte of Lakas–CMD who won.)		Sara Z. Duterte (Lakas)

=== Legislative elections ===
Interim Batasang Pambansa
Year	Seats won	Result	Senate abolished			
1978	150 / 179	KBL majority	Senate abolished			
Regular Batasang Pambansa
Year	Seats won	Result	Senate abolished			
1984	110 / 197	KBL majority	Senate abolished			
Congress of the Philippines
Year	Seats won	Result	Year	Seats won	Ticket	Result
1987	11 / 200	Lakas ng Bansa / PDP–Laban plurality	1987	0 / 24	Split ticket	LABAN win 22/24 seats
1992	3 / 200	LDP plurality	1992	0 / 24	Single party ticket	LDP win 16/24 seats
1995	1 / 204	Lakas–Laban majority	1995	0 / 12	Nationalist People's Coalition ticket	Lakas–Laban win 9/12 seats
1998	0 / 258	Lakas plurality	1998	Did not contest		LAMMP win 7/12 seats
2001	Did not contest	Lakas plurality	2001	0 / 13	Single party ticket	People Power win 8/13 seats
2004	1 / 261	Lakas plurality	2004	0 / 12	Single party ticket	K4 win 7/12 seats
2007	1 / 270	Lakas plurality	2007	0 / 12	Single party ticket	Go win 8/12 seats
2010	1 / 286	Lakas plurality	2010	0 / 12	Single party ticket	Liberal win 4/12 seats
2013	1 / 292	Liberal plurality	2013	Did not contest		Team PNoy win 9/12 seats
2016	0 / 297	Liberal Party plurality	2016	0 / 12	Single party ticket	Daang Matuwid win 7/12 seats
2019	0 / 304	PDP–Laban plurality	2019	0 / 12	Single party ticket	HNP win 9/12 seats
2022	0 / 316	PDP-Laban plurality	2022	0 / 12	UniTeam ticket	UniTeam win 6/12 seats
2025	Did not contest	Lakas plurality	2025	0 / 12	Single party ticket	Bagong Pilipinas win 6/12 seats
