= National Assembly (Second Philippine Republic) =

Former legislature of the Second Philippine Republic

←	2nd Commonwealth National Assembly	1st Commonwealth Congress	→
- Old Legislative Building (c. 1988)

Overview
- Term: September 25, 1943 – February 2, 1944
- President: Jose P. Laurel

National Assembly
- Members: 108
- Speaker: Benigno Aquino Sr.
- Floor leader: Francisco Zulueta

The National Assembly was the legislature of the Second Philippine Republic from September 25, 1943, to February 2, 1944.

Half of the membership of the assembly consisted of provincial governors or city mayors acting in an ex officio capacity, while the other half were indirectly elected through local conventions of KALIBAPI members during the Japanese occupation of the Philippines.

== Sessions ==
- First Special Session: October 18 – 23, 1943
- First Regular Session: November 25 – December 22, 1943
- Second Special Session: January 10 – February 2, 1944

== Legislation ==
The National Assembly of the Second Philippine Republic passed a total of 66 laws: Act No. 1 to 66.

=== Major legislation ===
- Act No. 1 – Creation of the Ministry of Foreign Affairs

== Party summary ==
Composition of the National Assembly during the Second Philippine Republic.

	Party (shading shows control)	Total	Vacant
	KALIBAPI	Total	Vacant
Begin	108	108	0
End	108	108	0
Final voting share	100%		

== Leadership ==
Speaker of the
National Assembly

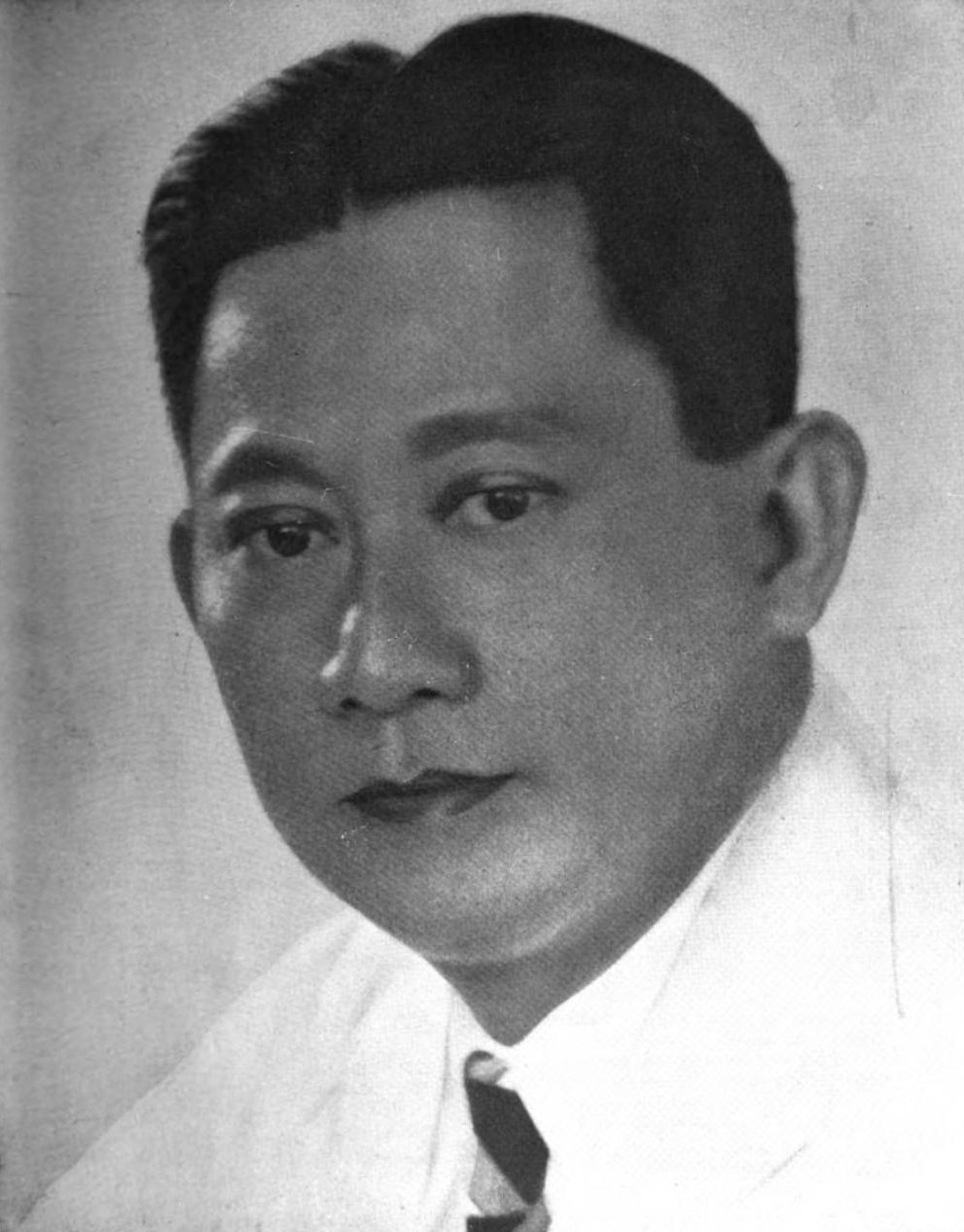
Benigno Aquino Sr.

- Speaker: Benigno Aquino Sr. (Tarlac, KALIBAPI)
- Floor Leader: Francisco Zulueta (Bacolod, KALIBAPI)

== Members ==
The assembly consisted of 108 members from 46 provinces and 8 chartered cities. The numbers and territorial coverages of these areas differed from the pre-war status in several ways:

- The provinces of Batanes, Marinduque and Romblon had been abolished and their municipalities annexed to Cagayan, Tayabas and Capiz respectively by virtue of Executive Order No. 84 issued by Philippine Executive Commission Chairman Jorge Vargas on August 31, 1942.
- Jurisdiction over several areas in Tayabas were transferred to Nueva Ecija (the municipalities of Baler and Casiguran; corresponding to the entire present-day territory of Aurora) and Laguna (Infanta, including the present-day municipalities of General Nakar and Real) by virtue of Executive Order No. 84 issued by Executive Commission Chairman Jorge Vargas on August 31, 1942.
- Jurisdiction over the Polillo Islands in Tayabas was transferred to Laguna by virtue of Executive Order No. 103 issued by Executive Commission Chairman Jorge Vargas on November 1, 1942.
- The chartered cities of Dansalan (now Marawi), Tagaytay and Zamboanga were also not represented separately in the assembly; their territories were administered by the governments of their mother provinces Lanao, Cavite and Zamboanga, respectively.
- The representation of Manila also included the chartered city of Quezon City, along with the Rizal municipalities of Caloocan, Makati, Mandaluyong, Parañaque, Pasay and San Juan, which were constituted as the City of Greater Manila by Manuel Quezon's Executive Act No. 400 on January 1, 1942, as an emergency wartime measure.

Province/City	Member	Party	Notes
Abra	Quintin Paredes Jr.	KALIBAPI	Elected
Abra	Juan Brillantes	KALIBAPI	Ex-officio
Agusan	Elisa Ochoa	KALIBAPI	Elected
Agusan	Ramon Aguirre	KALIBAPI	Ex-officio
Albay	Pio Duran	KALIBAPI	Elected
Albay	Julian Locsin Jr.	KALIBAPI	Ex-officio
Antique	Alberto A. Villavert	KALIBAPI	Elected
Antique	Tobias Fornier	KALIBAPI	Ex-officio
Bacolod	Francisco Zulueta	KALIBAPI	Elected
Bacolod	Alfredo Yulo	KALIBAPI	Ex-officio
Baguio	Florendo Aquino	KALIBAPI	Elected
Baguio	Nicasio Valderrosa	KALIBAPI	Ex-officio
Bataan	Joaquin Linao	KALIBAPI	Elected
Bataan	Simeon Salonga	KALIBAPI	Ex-officio
Batangas	Jose Laurel Jr.	KALIBAPI	Elected
Batangas	Maximo Malvar	KALIBAPI	Ex-officio
Bohol	Vicente Bullecer	KALIBAPI	Elected
Bohol	Agapito Hontanosas	KALIBAPI	Ex-officio
Bukidnon	Pedro Carrillo	KALIBAPI	Elected
Bukidnon	Antonio Rubin	KALIBAPI	Ex-officio
Bulacan	Jacinto Molina	KALIBAPI	Elected
Bulacan	Emilio Rustia	KALIBAPI	Ex-officio
Cagayan	Melecio Arranz	KALIBAPI	Elected
Cagayan	Nicanor Carag	KALIBAPI	Ex-officio
Camarines Norte	Trinidad Zenarosa	KALIBAPI	Elected
Camarines Norte	Carlos Ascutia	KALIBAPI	Ex-officio
Camarines Sur	Jose Fuentebella	KALIBAPI	Elected
Camarines Sur	Andres Hernandez	KALIBAPI	Ex-officio
Capiz	Eduardo Abalo	KALIBAPI	Elected
Capiz	Alfredo Jacinto	KALIBAPI	Ex-officio
Cavite	Emiliano Tria Tirona	KALIBAPI	Elected
Cavite	Luis Ferrer	KALIBAPI	Ex-officio
Cavite City	Demetrio Encarnacion	KALIBAPI	Elected
Cavite City	Ricardo Poblete	KALIBAPI	Ex-officio
Cebu	Jose Leyson	KALIBAPI	Elected
Cebu	Jose Delgado	KALIBAPI	Ex-officio
Cebu City	Paulino Gullas	KALIBAPI	Elected
Cebu City	Juan Zamora	KALIBAPI	Ex-officio
Cotabato	Menandang Piang	KALIBAPI	Elected
Cotabato	Alfonso Pablo	KALIBAPI	Ex-officio
Davao	Juan Sarenas	KALIBAPI	Elected
Davao	Romualdo Quimpo	KALIBAPI	Ex-officio
Davao City	Celestino Chavez	KALIBAPI	Elected
Davao City	Alfonso Oboza	KALIBAPI	Ex-officio
Ilocos Norte	Conrado Rubio	KALIBAPI	Elected
Ilocos Norte	Emilio Medina	KALIBAPI	Ex-officio
Ilocos Sur	Fidel Villanueva	KALIBAPI	Elected
Ilocos Sur	Alejandro Quirolgico	KALIBAPI	Ex-officio
Iloilo	Cirilo Mapa Jr.	KALIBAPI	Elected
Iloilo	Fermin Caram Sr.	KALIBAPI	Ex-officio
Iloilo City	Fortunato Ybiernas	KALIBAPI	Elected
Iloilo City	Vicente Ybiernas	KALIBAPI	Ex-officio
Isabela	Gregorio Formoso	KALIBAPI	Elected
Isabela	Lino Castillejos	KALIBAPI	Ex-officio
La Union	Rufino Macagba	KALIBAPI	Elected
La Union	Bonifacio Tadiar	KALIBAPI	Ex-officio
Laguna	Marcelo Zorilla	KALIBAPI	Elected
Laguna	Jesus Bautista	KALIBAPI	Ex-officio
Lanao	Datu Bato Ali	KALIBAPI	Elected
Lanao	Ciriaco Raval	KALIBAPI	Ex-officio
Leyte	Jose Maria Veloso	KALIBAPI	Elected
Leyte	Bernardo Torres	KALIBAPI	Ex-officio
Manila	Alfonso Mendoza	KALIBAPI	Elected
Manila	Leon Guinto	KALIBAPI	Ex-officio
Masbate	Emilio Espinosa	KALIBAPI	Elected
Masbate	Pio Corpus	KALIBAPI	Ex-officio
Mindoro	Raul Leuterio	KALIBAPI	Elected
Mindoro	Felipe Abeleda	KALIBAPI	Ex-officio
Misamis Occidental	Rufino Abadiez	KALIBAPI	Elected
Misamis Occidental	P.M. Stuart del Rosario	KALIBAPI	Ex-officio
Misamis Oriental	Isidro Vamenta	KALIBAPI	Elected
Misamis Oriental	Jose Artadi	KALIBAPI	Ex-officio
Mountain Province	Florencio Bagwan	KALIBAPI	Elected
Mountain Province	Hilary Clapp	KALIBAPI	Ex-officio
Negros Occidental	Gil Montilla	KALIBAPI	Elected
Negros Occidental	Vicente Gustilo	KALIBAPI	Ex-officio
Negros Oriental	Julian Teves	KALIBAPI	Elected
Negros Oriental	Guillermo Villanueva	KALIBAPI	Ex-officio
Nueva Ecija	Hermogenes Concepcion	KALIBAPI	Elected
Nueva Ecija	Jose Robles Jr.	KALIBAPI	Ex-officio
Nueva Vizcaya	Guillermo Boñgolan	KALIBAPI	Elected
Nueva Vizcaya	Demetrio Quirino	KALIBAPI	Ex-officio
Palawan	Iñigo Peña	KALIBAPI	Elected
Palawan	Patricio Fernandez	KALIBAPI	Ex-officio
Pampanga	Felix Bautista	KALIBAPI	Elected
Pampanga	Eligio Lagman	KALIBAPI	Ex-officio
Pangasinan	Bernabe Aquino	KALIBAPI	Elected
Pangasinan	Santiago Estrada	KALIBAPI	Ex-officio
Rizal	Nicanor Roxas	KALIBAPI	Elected
Rizal	Tomas Molina	KALIBAPI	Ex-officio
Samar	Serafin Marabut	KALIBAPI	Elected
Samar	Cayetano Lucero	KALIBAPI	Ex-officio
San Pablo	Sofronio Abrera	KALIBAPI	Elected
San Pablo	Tomas Dizon	KALIBAPI	Ex-officio
Sorsogon	Manuel Estipona	KALIBAPI	Elected
Sorsogon	Rafael Ramos	KALIBAPI	Ex-officio
Sulu	Gulamu Rasul	KALIBAPI	Elected
Sulu	Ombra Amilbangsa	KALIBAPI	Ex-officio
Surigao	Jose Cortez	KALIBAPI	Elected
Surigao	Fernando Silvosa	KALIBAPI	Ex-officio
Tarlac	Benigno Aquino Sr.	KALIBAPI	Elected
Tarlac	Sergio Aquino	KALIBAPI	Ex-officio
Tayabas	Tomas Morato	KALIBAPI	Elected
Tayabas	Natalio Enriquez	KALIBAPI	Ex-officio
Zambales	Valentin Afable	KALIBAPI	Elected
Zambales	Francisco Dantes	KALIBAPI	Ex-officio
Zamboanga	Juan Alano	KALIBAPI	Elected
Zamboanga	Agustin Luceo Alvarez	KALIBAPI	Ex-officio

Note: List is according to the National Assembly Yearbook 1943 and the Official program of the inauguration of the Republic of the Philippines and the induction into office of His Excellency Jose P. Laurel.

== See also ==
- National Assembly of the Philippines
- 1943 Philippine general election
