= Laguna's 1st congressional district =

Legislative district of the Philippines

- Constituency for the House of Representatives of the Philippines
- Location of Laguna within the Philippines
- Province: Laguna
- Region: Calabarzon
- Population: 326,001 (2020)
- Electorate: 188,803 (2025)
- Major settlements: San Pedro
- Area: 24.05 km^{2} (9.29 sq mi)

Current constituency
- Created: 1907
- Representative: Ann Matibag
- Political party: PFP
- Congressional bloc: Majority

Laguna's 1st congressional district is one of the six congressional districts of the Philippines in the province of Laguna, formerly La Laguna. It has been represented in the House of Representatives of the Philippines since 1916 and earlier in the Philippine Assembly from 1907 to 1916. The district currently consists of the northwestern city of San Pedro. It also encompassed the city of San Pablo and western Laguna municipalities of Alaminos, Bay, Cabuyao, Calamba, Calauan, Los Baños, Pila, and Victoria until 1972; Biñan until 2016; and Santa Rosa until 2022. It is currently represented in the 20th Congress by Ann Matibag of Partido Federal ng Pilipinas (PFP).

== Representation history ==
#	Image	Member	Term of office		Legislature	Party	Electoral history	Constituent LGUs
#	Image	Member	Start	End	Legislature	Party	Electoral history	Constituent LGUs
=== La Laguna's 1st district for the Philippine Assembly ===
District created January 9, 1907.
1		Pedro Paterno (1857–1911)	October 16, 1907	October 16, 1909	1st	Nacionalista	Elected in 1907.	1907–1909; Biñan, Cabuyao, Calamba, Calauan, Los Baños, Pila, San Pablo, San Pedro Tunasan, Santa Rosa
2		Potenciano Malvar (1867–1964)	October 16, 1909	October 1, 1910	2nd	Nacionalista	Elected in 1909. Resigned on appointment as La Laguna governor.	1909–1916; Bay, Biñan, Cabuyao, Calamba, Calauan, Los Baños, Pila, San Pablo, San Pedro Tunasan, Santa Rosa
3		Marcos Paulino (1871–1951)	December 20, 1910	October 16, 1912	2nd	Progresista	Elected in 1910 to finish Malvar's term.	1909–1916; Bay, Biñan, Cabuyao, Calamba, Calauan, Los Baños, Pila, San Pablo, San Pedro Tunasan, Santa Rosa
4		Serviliano Platón (1877–1953)	October 16, 1912	October 16, 1916	3rd	Nacionalista	Elected in 1912.	1909–1916; Bay, Biñan, Cabuyao, Calamba, Calauan, Los Baños, Pila, San Pablo, San Pedro Tunasan, Santa Rosa
=== La Laguna's 1st district for the House of Representatives of the Philippine Islands ===
5		Feliciano Gómez (1882–1944)	October 16, 1916	June 3, 1919	4th	Nacionalista	Elected in 1916.	1916–1919; Alaminos, Bay, Biñan, Cabuyao, Calamba, Calauan, Los Baños, Pila, San Pablo, San Pedro, Santa Rosa
=== Laguna's 1st district for the House of Representatives of the Philippine Islands ===
6		Vicente Ocampo (1873–1951)	June 3, 1919	June 6, 1922	5th	Nacionalista	Elected in 1919.	1919–1935; Alaminos, Bay, Biñan, Cabuyao, Calamba, Calauan, Los Baños, Pila, San Pablo, San Pedro, Santa Rosa
7		Tomás Dizon (1888–1966)	June 6, 1922	June 5, 1928	6th	Nacionalista; Colectivista	Elected in 1922.	1919–1935; Alaminos, Bay, Biñan, Cabuyao, Calamba, Calauan, Los Baños, Pila, San Pablo, San Pedro, Santa Rosa
7		Tomás Dizon (1888–1966)	June 6, 1922	June 5, 1928	7th	Nacionalista; Consolidado	Re-elected in 1925.	1919–1935; Alaminos, Bay, Biñan, Cabuyao, Calamba, Calauan, Los Baños, Pila, San Pablo, San Pedro, Santa Rosa
8		Román Gesmundo	June 5, 1928	June 2, 1931	8th	Nacionalista; Consolidado	Elected in 1928.	1919–1935; Alaminos, Bay, Biñan, Cabuyao, Calamba, Calauan, Los Baños, Pila, San Pablo, San Pedro, Santa Rosa
(5)		Feliciano Gómez (1882–1944)	June 2, 1931	June 5, 1934	9th	Nacionalista; Consolidado	Elected in 1931.	1919–1935; Alaminos, Bay, Biñan, Cabuyao, Calamba, Calauan, Los Baños, Pila, San Pablo, San Pedro, Santa Rosa
9		Aurelio C. Almazán	June 5, 1934	September 16, 1935	10th	Sakdalista	Elected in 1934.	1919–1935; Alaminos, Bay, Biñan, Cabuyao, Calamba, Calauan, Los Baños, Pila, San Pablo, San Pedro, Santa Rosa
#	Image	Member	Term of office		National Assembly	Party	Electoral history	Constituent LGUs
#	Image	Member	Start	End	National Assembly	Party	Electoral history	Constituent LGUs
=== Laguna's 1st district for the National Assembly (Commonwealth of the Philippines) ===
(7)		Tomás Dizon (1888–1966)	September 16, 1935	December 30, 1941	1st	Nacionalista; Democrático	Elected in 1935.	1935–1941; Alaminos, Bay, Biñan, Cabuyao, Calamba, Calauan, Los Baños, Pila, San Pablo, San Pedro, Santa Rosa
(7)		Tomás Dizon (1888–1966)	September 16, 1935	December 30, 1941	2nd	Nacionalista	Re-elected in 1938.	1935–1941; Alaminos, Bay, Biñan, Cabuyao, Calamba, Calauan, Los Baños, Pila, San Pablo, San Pedro, Santa Rosa
District dissolved into the two-seat Laguna's at-large district and the one-seat San Pablo's at-large district for the National Assembly (Second Philippine Republic).
#	Image	Member	Term of office		Common wealth Congress	Party	Electoral history	Constituent LGUs
#	Image	Member	Start	End	Common wealth Congress	Party	Electoral history	Constituent LGUs
=== Laguna's 1st district for the House of Representatives of the Commonwealth of the Philippines ===
District re-created May 24, 1945.
10		Conrado Potenciano (1888-1951)	June 11, 1945	May 25, 1946	1st	Nacionalista	Elected in 1941.	1945–1946; Alaminos, Bay, Biñan, Cabuyao, Calamba, Calauan, Los Baños, Pila, San Pablo, San Pedro, Santa Rosa
#	Image	Image	Term of office		Congress	Party	Electoral history	Constituent LGUs
#	Image	Image	Start	End	Congress	Party	Electoral history	Constituent LGUs
=== Laguna's 1st district for the House of Representatives of the Philippines ===
11		Eduardo A. Barretto	May 25, 1946	December 30, 1949	1st	Liberal	Elected in 1946.	1946–1949; Alaminos, Bay, Biñan, Cabuyao, Calamba, Calauan, Los Baños, Pila, San Pablo, San Pedro, Santa Rosa
12		Manuel A. Concordia	December 30, 1949	December 30, 1953	2nd	Liberal	Elected in 1949.	1949–1972; Alaminos, Bay, Biñan, Cabuyao, Calamba, Calauan, Los Baños, Pila, San Pablo, San Pedro, Santa Rosa, Victoria
13		Jacobo Z. Gonzales	December 30, 1953	December 30, 1961	3rd	Nacionalista	Elected in 1953.	1949–1972; Alaminos, Bay, Biñan, Cabuyao, Calamba, Calauan, Los Baños, Pila, San Pablo, San Pedro, Santa Rosa, Victoria
13		Jacobo Z. Gonzales	December 30, 1953	December 30, 1961	4th	Nacionalista	Re-elected in 1957.	1949–1972; Alaminos, Bay, Biñan, Cabuyao, Calamba, Calauan, Los Baños, Pila, San Pablo, San Pedro, Santa Rosa, Victoria
14		Joaquín E. Chipeco	December 30, 1961	December 30, 1965	5th	Nacionalista	Elected in 1961.	1949–1972; Alaminos, Bay, Biñan, Cabuyao, Calamba, Calauan, Los Baños, Pila, San Pablo, San Pedro, Santa Rosa, Victoria
(12)		Manuel A. Concordia	December 30, 1965	December 30, 1969	6th	Liberal	Elected in 1965.	1949–1972; Alaminos, Bay, Biñan, Cabuyao, Calamba, Calauan, Los Baños, Pila, San Pablo, San Pedro, Santa Rosa, Victoria
(14)		Joaquín E. Chipeco	December 30, 1969	September 23, 1972	7th	Nacionalista	Elected in 1969. Removed from office after imposition of martial law.	1949–1972; Alaminos, Bay, Biñan, Cabuyao, Calamba, Calauan, Los Baños, Pila, San Pablo, San Pedro, Santa Rosa, Victoria
District dissolved into the twenty-seat Region IV-A's at-large district for the Interim Batasang Pambansa, followed by the four-seat Laguna's at-large district for the Regular Batasang Pambansa.
District re-created February 2, 1987.
15		Nereo R. Joaquin (born 1939)	June 30, 1987	June 30, 1992	8th	LABAN	Elected in 1987.	1987–2016; Biñan, San Pedro, Santa Rosa
15		Nereo R. Joaquin (born 1939)	June 30, 1987	June 30, 1992	8th	NPC	Elected in 1987.	1987–2016; Biñan, San Pedro, Santa Rosa
16		Roy M. Almoro	June 30, 1992	June 30, 1995	9th	LDP	Elected in 1992.	1987–2016; Biñan, San Pedro, Santa Rosa
16		Roy M. Almoro	June 30, 1992	June 30, 1995	9th	Lakas	Elected in 1992.	1987–2016; Biñan, San Pedro, Santa Rosa
(15)		Nereo R. Joaquin (born 1939)	June 30, 1995	June 30, 1998	10th	LDP	Elected in 1995.	1987–2016; Biñan, San Pedro, Santa Rosa
17		Uliran T. Joaquin (born 1944)	June 30, 1998	June 30, 2007	11th	LAMMP	Elected in 1998.	1987–2016; Biñan, San Pedro, Santa Rosa
17		Uliran T. Joaquin (born 1944)	June 30, 1998	June 30, 2007	12th	NPC	Re-elected in 2001.	1987–2016; Biñan, San Pedro, Santa Rosa
17		Uliran T. Joaquin (born 1944)	June 30, 1998	June 30, 2007	13th	NPC	Re-elected in 2004.	1987–2016; Biñan, San Pedro, Santa Rosa
18		Dan Fernandez (born 1966)	June 30, 2007	June 30, 2016	14th	UNO	Elected in 2007. Election annulled by House electoral tribunal November 20, 2009 but reversed by Supreme Court January 4, 2010.	1987–2016; Biñan, San Pedro, Santa Rosa
18		Dan Fernandez (born 1966)	June 30, 2007	June 30, 2016	14th	Lakas	Elected in 2007. Election annulled by House electoral tribunal November 20, 2009 but reversed by Supreme Court January 4, 2010.	1987–2016; Biñan, San Pedro, Santa Rosa
18		Dan Fernandez (born 1966)	June 30, 2007	June 30, 2016	15th	Liberal	Re-elected in 2010.	1987–2016; Biñan, San Pedro, Santa Rosa
18		Dan Fernandez (born 1966)	June 30, 2007	June 30, 2016	16th	Liberal	Re-elected in 2013.	1987–2016; Biñan, San Pedro, Santa Rosa
19		Arlene Arcillas (born 1969)	June 30, 2016	June 30, 2019	17th	Liberal	Elected in 2016.	2016–2022; San Pedro, Santa Rosa
19		Arlene Arcillas (born 1969)	June 30, 2016	June 30, 2019	17th	PDP–Laban	Elected in 2016.	2016–2022; San Pedro, Santa Rosa
(18)		Dan Fernandez (born 1966)	June 30, 2019	June 30, 2022	18th	PDP–Laban	Elected in 2019. Redistricted to Santa Rosa's at-large district.	2016–2022; San Pedro, Santa Rosa
(18)		Dan Fernandez (born 1966)	June 30, 2019	June 30, 2022	18th	NUP	Elected in 2019. Redistricted to Santa Rosa's at-large district.	2016–2022; San Pedro, Santa Rosa
20		Ann Matibag (born 1984)	June 30, 2022	Incumbent	19th	PDP–Laban	Elected in 2022.	2022–present San Pedro
20		Ann Matibag (born 1984)	June 30, 2022	Incumbent	20th	Lakas	Re-elected in 2025.	2022–present San Pedro
20		Ann Matibag (born 1984)	June 30, 2022	Incumbent	20th	PFP	Re-elected in 2025.	2022–present San Pedro

== Election results ==
=== 2025 ===
2025 Philippine House of Representatives election in the Laguna's 1st congressional district
Party	Candidate	Votes	%
Lakas	Ma. Rene Ann Lourdes G. Matibag (AMB)	111,214	100
Total votes		111,214	100
Lakas hold			

=== 2022 ===
2022 Philippine House of Representatives elections
Party	Candidate	Votes	%
PDP–Laban	Ma. Rene Ann Lourdes Garcia Matibag	69,815	50.68
Nacionalista	Dave Almarinez	53,783	39.04
PRP	Dave Aldave	5,346	3.88
Liberal	Kathleen Kay Gilbuena	4,028	2.92
Independent	Edsel Mercado, Jr.	3,889	2.82
Independent	John Gilbuena	895	0.64
Total votes		137,756	100.00
PDP–Laban gain from NUP			

=== 2019 ===
2019 Philippine House of Representatives elections
Party	Candidate	Votes	%
PDP–Laban	Danilo Fernandez	188,929	100.00
Total votes		188,929	100.00
PDP–Laban hold			

=== 2016 ===
2016 Philippine House of Representatives elections
Party	Candidate	Votes	%
Liberal	Arlene Arcillas	196,440	73.45
Invalid or blank votes		71,012	26.55
Total votes		267,452	100.00
Liberal hold			

=== 2013 ===
2013 Philippine House of Representatives elections
Party	Candidate	Votes	%
Liberal	Danilo Ramon Fernandez	131,384	63.30
PDP–Laban	Gat-Ala Alatiit, Jr.	43,441	20.93
Margin of victory		87,943	42.37%
Invalid or blank votes		32,717	15.76
Total votes		207,542	100.00
Liberal hold			

=== 2010 ===
2010 Philippine House of Representatives elections
Party	Candidate	Votes	%
Lakas–Kampi	Danilo Fernandez	219,439	75.89
NPC	Uliran Joaquin	69,715	24.11
Valid ballots		289,154	94.82
Invalid or blank votes		15,783	5.18
Total votes		304,937	100.00
Lakas–Kampi hold			

=== 2007 ===
2022 Philippine House of Representatives elections
Party	Candidate	Votes	%
Lakas	Danilo Fernandez	95,927	43.74%
NPC	Nereo Joaquin, Jr.	61,891	28.22%
Independent	Felicisimo Vierneza	46,541	21.22%
PMP	Gabnulang Alatiit	14,519	6.62%
Liberal	Libreto Patromo	426	0.19%
Total votes		219,304	100.00
Lakas gain from NPC			

=== 2004 ===
2004 Philippine House of Representatives elections
Party	Candidate	Votes	%
NPC	Uliran Joaquin	166,558	70.46%
Lakas	Melvin Matibag	69,812	29.54%
Total votes		236,370	100.00
NPC hold			

=== 2001 ===
2001 Philippine House of Representatives elections
Party	Candidate	Votes	%
NPC	Uliran Joaquin	136,795	83.23%
Lakas	Arturo Anas	24,497	14.91%
Independent	Cornelio Lauron, Jr.	3,056	1.86%
Total votes		164,348	100.00
NPC hold			

=== 1998 ===
1998 Philippine House of Representatives elections
Party	Candidate	Votes	%
LAMMP	Uliran Joaquin	111,659	56.01
Lakas	Calixto Cataquiz	77,736	38.99%
Reporma	Reynaldo Cardeno	8,569	4.3%
PDP–Laban	Jacinto Lappay	1,396	0.7%
Total votes		199,360	100.00
LAMMP hold			

=== 1995 ===
1995 Philippine House of Representatives elections
Party	Candidate	Votes	%
LDP	Nereo Joaquin	71,692	53.39%
Lakas	Roy Almoro	62,576	46.61%
Total votes		134,268	100.00
LDP gain from Lakas			

=== 1992 ===
1992 Philippine House of Representatives elections
Party	Candidate	Votes	%
LDP	Roy Almoro	44,756	37.72
NPC	Noe Zarate	31,835	26.83
LDP	Roman Artes	15,360	12.95
Nacionalista	Rodolfo Galang	11,364	9.58
Independent	Potenciano Flores, Jr.	5,544	4.67
KBL	Leonardo Lazarte	3,928	3.31
NUCD	Luis Alberto	3,326	2.80
KBL	Victor Escueta	1,994	1.68
Lakas	Roland Rivera	548	0.46
Total votes		118,655	100.00

=== 1910 special ===
1910 La Laguna's 1st Philippine Assembly district special election
Party	Candidate	Votes	%
Progresista	Marcos Paulino	1,491	59.66
Nacionalista	Serviliano Platon	1,008	40.34
Total votes		2,499	100.00
Progresista gain from Nacionalista			

== See also ==
- Legislative districts of Laguna
