= Sakdalista =

Lapiang Sakdal
- Leader: Benigno Ramos; Celerino Tiongco
- Founded: 1933; 93 years ago
- Dissolved: 1935; 91 years ago
- Succeeded by: Ganap Party
- Headquarters: Manila, Philippines
- Newspaper: Sakdal
- Ideology: Filipino nationalism Populism; Anti-imperialism; Anti-Americanism; Agrarianism
- Political position: Left-wing

The Sakdalista movement was founded by the writer Benigno Ramos in 1930. The name of the movement is derived from the Tagalog word "Sakdal", which means "to accuse" and a nod to the J'Accuse…! editorial of the French novelist Émile Zola. The movement's platform was centered upon immediate independence, estate redistribution, taxation reductions, and greater governmental transparency. The movement lasted until 1935, when the Sakdalista leaders organized an active uprising that quickly failed, causing the party to dissolve. The movement is estimated to have had 20,000 formal members that influenced hundreds of thousands of Filipinos in the early 1930s.

== Identity of the movement ==
The central goal of the Sakdalistas was simple: they wanted complete and immediate independence from the United States, which they believed would be the most effective means towards the alleviation of crippling taxation. The movement was born out of frustrations with corruption and inequality. Benigno Ramos described these sentiments in a December 1930 editorial: "In Manila we see our so-called leaders growing fat and rich on money amassed from taxing the poor. They have fine automobiles and fine homes for themselves, but for us they have only fine and empty words. They have learned to promise as much as the Americans and to deliver as little."

People joined the Sakdalista movement for a variety of reasons. The party fearlessly exposed the wrongdoings of politicians, was truly compassionate about the poor and oppressed, was uncompromising in its stand on independence, and possessed integrity in terms of living up to its record of not being after the people's money. Its members perceived the movement as being very honest, as it was founded by a small group of modest middle-class citizens.

The Sakdalistas believed that, if independence were gained, the government would be able to right all of its past wrongs by giving land back to the landless, looking after the workers' welfare, nationalizing industries, providing youths with Filipino educations, setting up a pro-people judiciary, and keeping a close watch on the performance of politicians. The consensus was that this would all result in citizens not committing crimes because of a new independent standard of life where everybody would be rich, happy, and comfortable.

=== Benigno Ramos ===
Benigno Ramos (1893–1946) spent his youth and formative years working as a poet, schoolmaster, government clerk, and newspaper editor before he was hired by Manuel Quezon to become a full-time translator for the Senate in 1917. He spent thirteen years as an influential speechwriter and orator, and in the process he amassed a small but solid following of political admirers by speaking for Quezon at party functions in Manila and Bulacan.

A falling out with Quezon in June 1930 caused Ramos to resign from his government positions at the request of the Senate President. Ramos began publishing the Sakdal newspaper, thus founding the Sakdalista movement. After managing the paper for four years, Ramos made the strategic shift towards actively campaigning for Sakdalistas to get seats in government positions rather than simply pushing critical writings through the newspaper. The Sakdalistas had several unexpected electoral victories throughout the 1934 general election, making Benigno more famous than ever.

Ramos observed the massive failure of the May 1935 uprising from Tokyo. He refused to acknowledge the loss, and countered, "we know the American Government in the Islands is so strong that revolt against it means suicide. But what else can we do?" Ramos' response to the uprising cut his power, and public opinion quickly shifted against him.

He permanently moved to Japan in order to continue his work on Filipino independence by forming the Ganap political party. Ramos spent the years 1939 to 1942 in jail for illegal solicitation of money, and after his release he helped found the Kalibapi and Makapili political organizations. He possibly died in a plane crash in 1946, but the details of his death remain unknown.

== History of the movement ==
=== Origins ===
In February 1930, an American teacher working in the Philippines, Mabel Brummitt, made racist insults toward several high school students, referring to them as "a bunch of sweet potato eaters" and "monkeys". In retaliation to the teacher's racist comments, the students staged high-profile walkout protests. Benigno Ramos found that he was sympathetic to the students' cause, so he decided to participate in the protests.

Ramos was an eloquent high-level government employee, and his vocal dissent was at odds with the beliefs of future Filipino president Manuel Quezon. Quezon was a senator at the time, and also served as Ramos' employer and mentor. He insisted that Ramos resign from his government positions upon hearing about his participation in the protest, and on June 18, Ramos acquiesced.

Angered by the government's response to the protest, Ramos decided to establish a newspaper that would serve as a pulpit to air his criticisms of the current Filipino regime. Using personal funds as well as donations from friends and admirers, the first issue of his fortnightly newspaper, Sakdal, was published on June 28, 1930. The distribution of this first issue signaled the formal beginning of the Sakdalista movement.

=== 1931–1932 ===
The paper consisted of defenses of weak, impoverished, and exploited citizens in the Philippines. Any critic of the current regime was able to contribute editorials to the paper, and circulation grew to 18,494 subscribers by the end of 1931. The paper depended upon government-sanctioned mailing privileges, and so thus the writers were sometimes forced to avoid sensitive topics at certain tense moments at the risk of having their voices silenced completely. In addition to regularly printing criticism of officials, Sakdalistas collected donations for exiled sympathizers, boycotted foreign goods, and gave speeches at the request of various organizations in locations ranging from Pampanga to Zambales to Marinduque.

In 1932, the organization raised enough funds through donations in order to buy their own printing press, which streamlined the publication process. Near the end of the year, Sakdal subscribers raised several thousand pesos to send Benigno Ramos on a diplomatic trip to the United States in order to protest the Hare–Hawes–Cutting Act in front of Congress. Ramos would bring copies of Sakdal with him to disperse along the way in order to rally foreign sympathizers to his cause.

==== Hare–Hawes–Cutting Act ====
The Hare–Hawes–Cutting Act originated with rural American farmer political action committees. The American PACs believed that Filipino imports posed great dangers to their economic welfare during the Great Depression. The law would subject Filipinos to official American tariffs and commence a ten-year transition towards independence. The Sakdalistas believed that ten years was an excessively long waiting period, and thus vehemently disapproved of the bill. The Filipino Nacionalista Party was in favor of the act, which was eventually approved by the United States Congress in early 1933 after a veto from President Herbert Hoover was overturned.

=== 1933 ===
Ramos left for the United States on April 10, and Sakdal editor Celerino Tiongco became the acting manager of the newspaper in his absence. Ramos toured through California, Utah, and Denver over several months, finally arriving in Washington D.C. in July. To the Sakdalistas' dismay, Ramos was unable to stop the passage of the Hare–Hawes–Cutting Act because of his leisurely pace through the west. He had arrived to the capital too late to act.

Ramos' ineffective tour caused a great sense of frustration within the Sakdalista party. The management concluded that their standard methods of political demonstration and critical press were not going to be effective in advancing towards independence. Furthermore, the incumbent legislators in the Philippines were certainly not going to change their minds on the subject. Considering the fact that the country's general election was set to occur the next year, they decided that the only way forward was to form their own political party and gain official seats in congress. Thus, the official Sakdalista political party was formed in mid-October, 1933.

=== 1934 ===
Chapters of the movement were established all across the Philippines in preparation for the June Senate and House elections. The Sakdalistas made a credible showing, winning all three seats that they ran for in the House of Representatives. A Sakdalista became governor of the Marinduque province. Additionally, "[i]n Laguna, Bulacan, Rizal, and Cavite, the party's candidates for municipal offices made remarkable showings and won more than a score of important posts." These numerous victories were certainly not strong enough to truly challenge the Nacionalista's support of the Tydings–McDuffie Act (a successor to the Hare–Hawes–Cutting Act), but they were enough to move the Sakdalista movement into the limelight and illustrate the extent of rural discontent in the Philippines.

The Nacionalista party quickly realized the true power of the Sakdalista movement. They immediately resolved petty intra-party differences in order to close ranks and politically exclude the Sakdalistas. To counter this political obstacle, Ramos traveled to Japan in November in an attempt to gain foreign support after his failed tour through the United States.

==== Tydings–McDuffie Act ====
This act, enacted March 24, 1934, was the direct successor of the Hare-Hawes-Cutting Act from the year before. It, like the Hare–Hawes–Cutting Act, also promised independence after 10 years, to which Ramos responded "[h]ow many 'Ten Years' does the U.S. Government need to kill our independence, and… confiscate all the lands of the Filipinos?" (Sturtevant Book, 231). The act was one of the central motivating factors behind the continued frustrations of the Sakdalista party, and it inspired Ramos to embrace the idea of more drastic methods of protestation.

=== 1935 ===
The Sakdalistas in power promised their constituents that the Philippines would have complete and absolute independence by December 31, 1935, if they had their way in congress. Aside from continuing the usual inflammatory diatribe, Ramos laid out seven new objectives:

1. Investigation of religious lands
2. Formation of a 500,000-man Philippine Army
3. Teaching of native languages in the public schools
4. Retention of lawyers to defend poor clients
5. Reduction of official salaries
6. Pay increases for teachers, policemen, and laborers.
7. Adoption of voting machines to prevent election frauds

With the party officially recognized in Congress, the Sakdalistas were more hopeful than ever. However, the newfound hope was quickly extinguished by the political exclusion perpetrated by the Nacionalista party. Thus, the Sakdalistas instituted a drastic shift in strategy.

==== May 2 Uprising ====
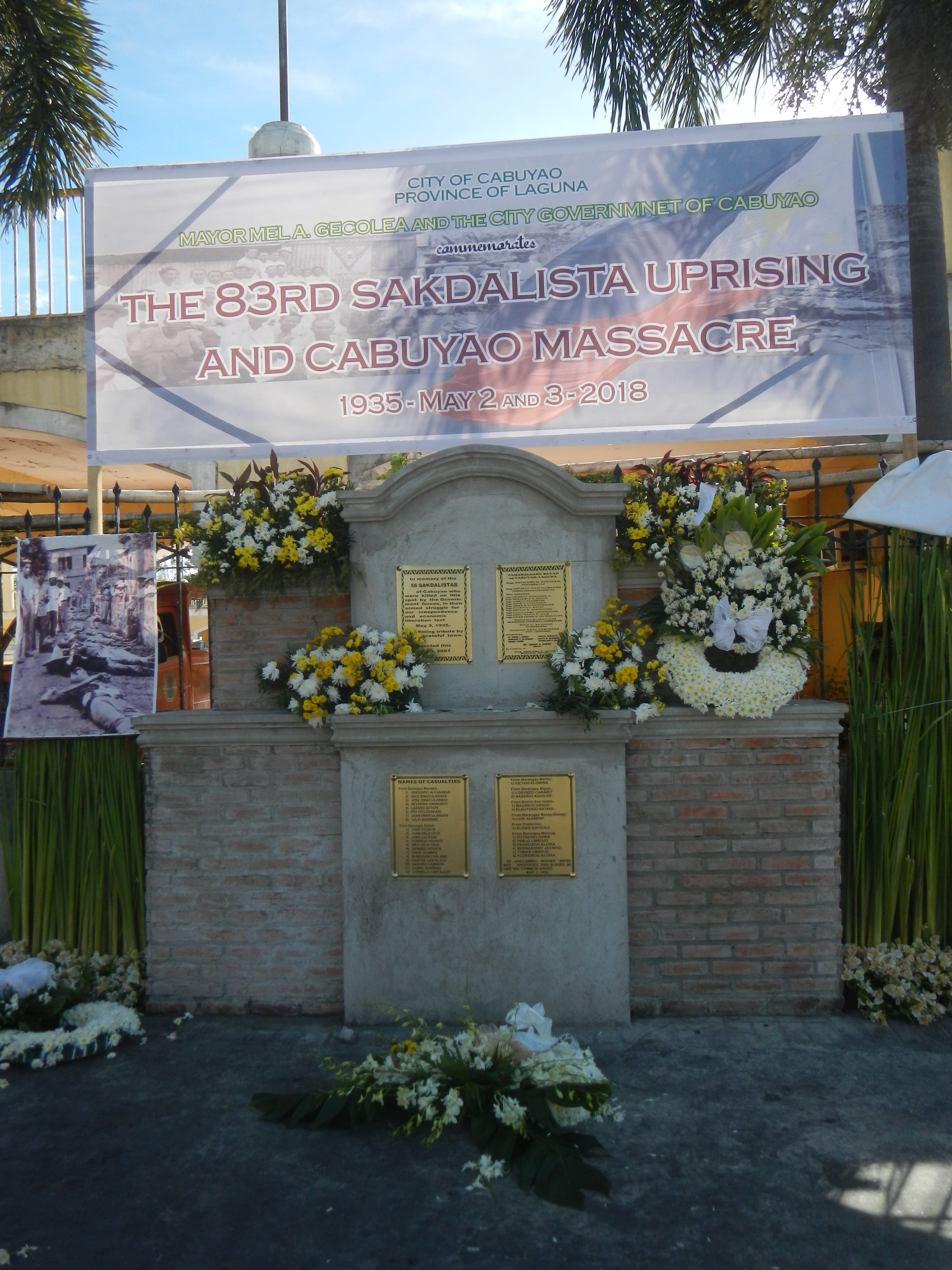
Memorial to the 56 marchers of Cabuyao killed in the May 2 Uprising.

The Sakdalista party had grown quickly over a short period of time, and by early April, their activities in the provinces surrounding Manila were causing concern in government circles. The Filipino government, anticipating escalating acts of public unrest, stifled the Sakdal newspaper by revoking its mailing rights and by ordering that public meetings could only be held with government-sponsored permits. These measures proved unsuccessful, however, because Ramos had succeeded in printing and smuggling thousands of copies of a Japanese-sponsored pamphlet entitled "Free Filipinos" while on his tour of Japan. The pamphlet offered the illusion of popular Japanese support for the Sakdal cause.

The alleged Japanese approval combined with the numerous frustrations of the Sakdalistas, and a popular uprising was planned. Late on May 1, 1935, Sakdalista activists spread the word that the endeavor to achieve independence would begin within twenty-four hours. Hesitant party members were told that, in the event of retaliatory American military action, Japan would intervene with support on the side of the Sakdalistas. Additionally, many were told that the constables had become sympathetic to the Sakdalista cause, and would assist in the uprising by throwing down their weapons.

During the evening of May 2, it is estimated that as many as 68,000 Sakdalistas convened at prearranged locations in order to march on several municipalities. They expected the constables to throw down their weapons as allies, but were instead greeted with intentional rifle fire. The Washington Post reported that there had been 69 deaths by noon on May 3, with the total death count at about 100. More than 1,000 protesters had been arrested. The rebellion had been immediately crushed, and the organizers of the protest went into hiding. The scale of the demonstration was impressive, but not nearly large nor effective enough to force an immediate change in government in a US territory of 12 million people.

== Aftermath and legacy of the movement ==
The Sakdalistas were decisively defeated in their attempted uprising, and the public opinion of Benigno Ramos quickly sank to an all-time low. However, the party's efforts were not completely in vain. Congress assumed a more empathetic stance towards the Sakdalista mentality, and thus granted three concessions.

1. Initiation of a program of land redistribution via various estate purchases.
2. Formation of the National Rice and Corn Corporation to provide storage facilities for small farmers.
3. Allocation of funds to pay public defenders in legal trials of the nation's poorest citizens.

Despite these parliamentary successes, dissidents became progressively more dispersed in the absence of Ramos' guiding charisma. He rarely returned to the Philippines, and Sakdal ceased to be published. It was impressive that such a diverse body of citizens had been brought under one banner by a middle-class leader, but the formal movement had come to an end, and little progress had been made for the poorest Filipino citizens.
