= San Pablo's at-large assembly district =

At-large Philippine legislative district for Batangas

- Former constituency for the National Assembly of the Philippines
- City: San Pablo
- Province: Laguna

Former constituency
- Created: 1943
- Abolished: 1945

San Pablo's at-large assembly district refers to the representation of the city of San Pablo in the province of Laguna in the National Assembly (Second Philippine Republic) from 1943 to 1944. The city sent two representatives to the assembly. After the dissolution of the Second Republic in 1945, the district was incorporated into the Laguna's 1st congressional district for the re-established House of Representatives.

== List of members representing the district ==
=== National Assembly (1935–1944) ===
==== Second Republic ====
Seat A					Seat B					Legislature	Constituency
Portrait	Member (Lifespan)	Term of office	Party	Electoral history	Portrait	Member (Lifespan)	Term of office	Party	Electoral history	Legislature	Constituency
District created September 7, 1943.
	Sofronio Abrera (1896–1962)	September 25, 1943 – February 2, 1944	KALIBAPI	Elected in 1943.		Tomas Dizon (1888–1966)	September 25, 1943 – February 2, 1944	KALIBAPI	Appointed as an ex officio member. (Note: As Mayor of San Pablo.)	National Assembly (Second Republic)	1943–1944; San Pablo
District dissolved into Laguna's 1st district for the House of Representatives.

== See also ==
- Legislative districts of San Pablo

== Sources ==
- "Roster of Philippine Legislators (1907 - 2019)" (PDF). House of Representatives of the Philippines. 2019. Archived (PDF) from the original on August 13, 2025.
