= Cavite City's at-large assembly district =

At-large Philippine legislative district for Batangas

- Former constituency for the National Assembly of the Philippines
- City: Cavite City
- Province: Cavite

Former constituency
- Created: 1943
- Abolished: 1945

Cavite City's at-large assembly district refers to the representation of Cavite City in the National Assembly (Second Philippine Republic) from 1943 to 1944. The city sent two representatives to the assembly. After the dissolution of the Second Republic in 1945, the district was incorporated into the province-wide congressional district of Cavite for the re-established House of Representatives.

== List of members representing the district ==
=== National Assembly (1935–1944) ===
==== Second Republic ====
Seat A					Seat B					Legislature	Constituency
Portrait	Member (Lifespan)	Term of office	Party	Electoral history	Portrait	Member (Lifespan)	Term of office	Party	Electoral history	Legislature	Constituency
District created September 7, 1943.
	Demetrio Encarnacion	September 25, 1943 – February 2, 1944	KALIBAPI	Elected in 1943.		Ricardo Poblete	September 25, 1943 – February 2, 1944	KALIBAPI	Appointed as an ex officio member. (Note: As Mayor of Cavite City.)	National Assembly (Second Republic)	1943–1944; Cavite City
District dissolved into Cavite's at-large district for the House of Representatives.

== See also ==
- Legislative districts of Cavite City

== Sources ==
- "Roster of Philippine Legislators (1907 - 2019)" (PDF). House of Representatives of the Philippines. 2019. Archived (PDF) from the original on August 13, 2025.
