= Benigno Ramos =

Filipino poet and revolutionary (1892–1945)

- Born: Benigno Ramos y Pantaleón; February 10, 1892; Bulakan, Bulacan, Captaincy General of the Philippines
- Disappeared: 1945 (aged 52–53) according to most sources Philippines
- Other name: Ben Ruben
- Occupations: Author, writer, politician
- Known for: Advocate for the independence of the Philippines from the United States author, writer Founder, Sakdalista movement, Ganap Party, Makapili
- Political party: Ganap Party
- Other political affiliations: Nacionalista (until 1930)
- Movement: Sakdalista

Benigno "Ben Ruben" Ramos y Pantaleón (February 10, 1892 – disappeared 1945) was a Filipino author, writer, organization founder, politician, and an advocate for the independence of the Philippines from the United States who collaborated with Japan.

Educated in Bulacan, Ramos went to work there as a teacher. Later, whilst based in Manila, he entered the civil service and by 1928 had risen to a high position with the Senate Staff. He became a member of the Nacionalista Party and a close associate of Manuel L. Quezon but this came to an end in 1930 when he joined a wildcat strike by teachers in the capital, causing Quezon to demand his resignation. Ramos did so but became a figure of anti-Quezon agitation, setting up a Tagalog language newspaper Sakdal which gained a wide circulation in rural areas.

Ramos reconstituted his followers as the Sakdalista movement. Gaining as many as 20,000 members the group launched an attempted uprising in May 1935 but this was quickly crushed and Ramos went into exile in Japan.

Ramos returned to Manila on August 28, 1938 on board the German passenger ship Gneisenau. He became leader of the Ganap Party which contested the 1941 elections (although Ramos himself was imprisoned during the vote). During the Japanese occupation this group became part of the KALIBAPI governing coalition, whilst Ramos formed the Makapili, a militant youth movement that aimed to limit the power of José P. Laurel and to provide soldiers for Japan. The followers of Ramos and his ally Artemio Ricarte were eventually armed by the Japanese in December 1944 by which time the Americans had already landed.

Accounts differ on Ramos' fate after the fall of the Second Philippine Republic; some claim that he was killed in an airplane crash in Baguio along with the retreating Japanese.

Aside from his political activism, Ramos was also noted as a writer of poetry with a collection Mga Agam-agam at Iba Pang Tula due for publication.
