= 1910 La Laguna's 1st Philippine Assembly district special election =

1910 La Laguna's 1st assembly district special election
- December 10, 1910

La Laguna's 1st district seat in the Philippine Assembly Triggered by resignation of incumbent
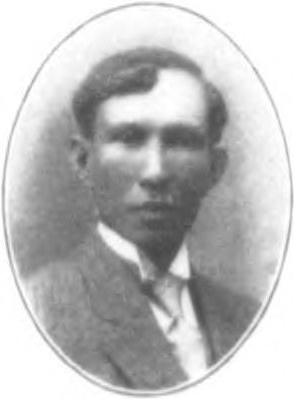

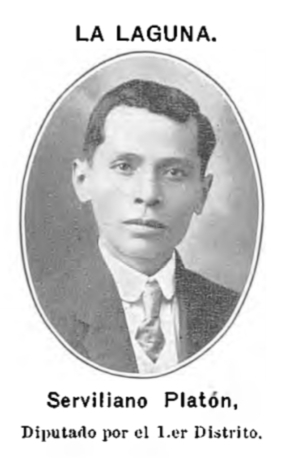
Candidate	Marcos Paulino	Serviliano Platon
Party	Progresista	Nacionalista
Popular vote	1,491	1,008
Percentage	59.66%	40.34%
Delegate before election
Potenciano Malvar
Nacionalista
Subsequent delegate
Marcos Paulino
Progresista

A special election (known elsewhere as "by-elections") for the seat of La Laguna's 1st district in the Philippine Assembly, the lower house of the Philippine Legislature of the Insular Government of the Philippine Islands, was held on December 13, 1910. This was triggered due to the appointment of the incumbent delegate Potenciano Malvar as the governor of La Laguna (now called simply as Laguna).

Marcos Paulino won the special election, defeating Serviliano Platon, a flip from the Nacionalista Party to the Progresista Party. He served the remainder of Malvar's term during the 2nd Philippine Legislature, which ended in 1912.

== Background ==
Juan Cailles, a Progresista Party stalwart, was to retire as governor of La Laguna. In the immediately preceding gubernatorial election, the Nacionalista Party's Domingo Ordoveza won, but Governor-General William Cameron Forbes, upon the advice of vice governor Newton W. Gilbert, was convinced that Ordoveza bought votes and refused to seat him nor Cailles, and will appoint someone from the Nacionalista Party instead. On September 22, 1910, Forbes appointed Potenciano Malvar, the younger brother of Miguel Malvar and incumbent delegate from La Laguna's 1st district, as governor, succeeding Cailles. La Democracia newspaper had opposed Malvar's appointment, pointing out that he was ineligible for the post as a sitting member of the Philippine Assembly. La Democracia is the official organ of the Progresistas. A day later, the Philippine Commission approved the appointment of Malvar as provincial governor. On October 4, Forbes scheduled the special election for the vacant assembly seat on December 13.

=== District profile ===
La Laguna's 1st district composed of the province's western municipalities of Bay, Binang, Cabuyao, Calamba, Calauang, Los Baños, Pila, San Pablo, San Pedro Tunasan, and Santa Rosa since its establishment in 1907. Although legally part of San Pablo at the time, Alaminos was listed separately.

== Candidates ==
A total of two persons ran to fill the vacant seat, namely:

- Marcos Paulino (Progresista), municipal president of San Pablo (1902–1906)
- Serviliano Platon (Nacionalista), former revolutionary captain and law graduate

== Results ==
Marcos Paulino of the Progresista Party defeated Serviliano Platon of the Nacionalistas. The latter carried Calauang, Los Baños, Santa Rosa and San Pedro Tunasan, Binang saw a tied result, and the former won in Alaminos, Bay, Calamba, Cabuyao, Pila and San Pablo. Paulino's win increased the number of opposition Progresistas in the assembly during the 2nd Philippine Legislature. Paulino took his oath of office at the Ayuntamiento de Manila on December 20, 1910.

1910 La Laguna's 1st Philippine Assembly district special election
Candidate	Party	Votes	%
Marcos Paulino	Progresista Party	1,491	59.66
Serviliano Platon	Nacionalista Party	1,008	40.34
Total		2,499	100.00
Majority		483	19.33
Progresista Party gain from Nacionalista Party			
Source: The Cablenews-American

=== Per town ===
Town	Paulino		Platon		Total
Town	Votes	%	Votes	%	Total
Alaminos (Note: Alaminos was part of San Pablo from 1903 to 1916 but was grouped separately during the 1910 tally.)	200	74.07%	70	25.93%	270
Bay	76	50.33%	75	49.67%	151
Binang	106	50.00%	106	50.00%	212
Cabuyao	91	60.26%	60	39.74%	151
Calamba	107	66.46%	54	33.54%	161
Calauang	33	45.21%	40	54.79%	73
Los Baños	21	30.88%	47	69.12%	68
Pila	64	51.61%	60	48.39%	124
San Pablo	725	67.32%	352	32.68%	1,077
San Pedro Tunasan	35	43.75%	45	56.25%	80
Santa Rosa	33	25.00%	99	75.00%	132
Total	1,491	59.66%	1,008	40.34%	2,499

== Aftermath ==
Serviliano Platon won the district's seat in the 1912 general election, succeeding Marcos Paulino. He served as assemblyman for one term until 1916, and then became a judge of the court of first instance in Tayabas during the 1930s. Paulino became governor of Laguna from 1914 to 1916.
