= Serviliano Platon =

Filipino lawyer and politician (1877-1953)

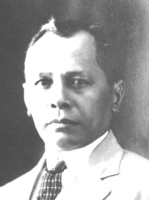

Member of the Philippine Assembly from La Laguna's 1st district
- In office October 16, 1912 – October 16, 1916
- Preceded by: Marcos Paulino
- Succeeded by: Feliciano Gómez

Personal details
- Born: Serviliano Platón y Javier; April 20, 1877 Tanauan, Batangas, Captaincy General of the Philippines
- Died: January 24, 1953 (aged 75) Manila, Philippines
- Party: Nacionalista
- Education: Colegio de San Juan de Letran; University of Santo Tomas

Serviliano Platón y Javier (20 April 1877 – 24 January 1953), also spelled as Servillano Platon, was a Filipino nationalist and politician who became a member of the Philippine Assembly from 1912 to 1916.

== Biography ==
=== Early life and education ===
Platon was born in Tanauan, Batangas to a poor family. Due to this, he relied on his relatives for his education. At age 6, he was sent to elementary school and to a public school in the municipality.

In 1888, Platon studied in the school ran by Vicente Laureola, a Professor in Latin and a Civil Law graduate. In 1894, he moved to Manila and attended San Juan de Letran. However, he stopped his studies due to the Philippine Revolution and return to Batangas. In 1898, he joined the revolutionary forces and was captain until 1900 due to illness.

In 1905, Platon once again returned to Manila to continue studying and enrolled at the University of Santo Tomas. He graduated at the university in 1910 with a degree in law.

=== Political career ===
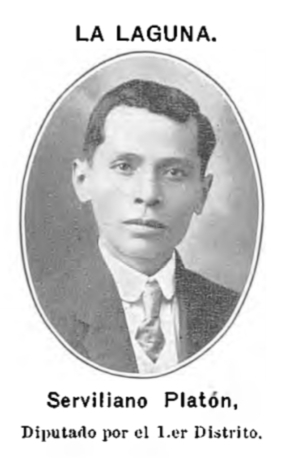
Platon as member of the Philippine Assembly, c. 1913

In 1910, Platon ran for assemblyman of the 1st District of La Laguna in a special election, but lost to Marcos Paulino. In 1912, he was finally elected to the Philippine Assembly as assemblyman of the same district, serving for one term until 1916.

== Later career ==
Platon became Court of First Instance in the provinces of Tayabas and Rizal during the 1940s. He also became Judge of First Instance in Albay during the 1930s.
