= Nunong Karugtong =

Nunong Karugtong was the name of a legendary figure in early Philippine history who supposedly established Binangonan de Lampon, the settlement which would eventually become the modern-day municipality of Infanta, Quezon.

According to the legend, a group of settlers led by a figure named Nunong Karugtong crossed the Sierra Madre Mountains from what is now Rizal Province in search of better living conditions. After examining multiple sites, they eventually settled on a site near the Bantilan River, where the discovery of a huge yam root convinced them that the site was ideal for settlement. This eventually became the site of the settlement which European colonizers would call "Binangonan de Lampon," which in turn evolved into the Municipality of Infanta.
