= Northern Quezon College =

Private college in Quezon, Philippines

Northern Quezon College Incorporated
- NQCI
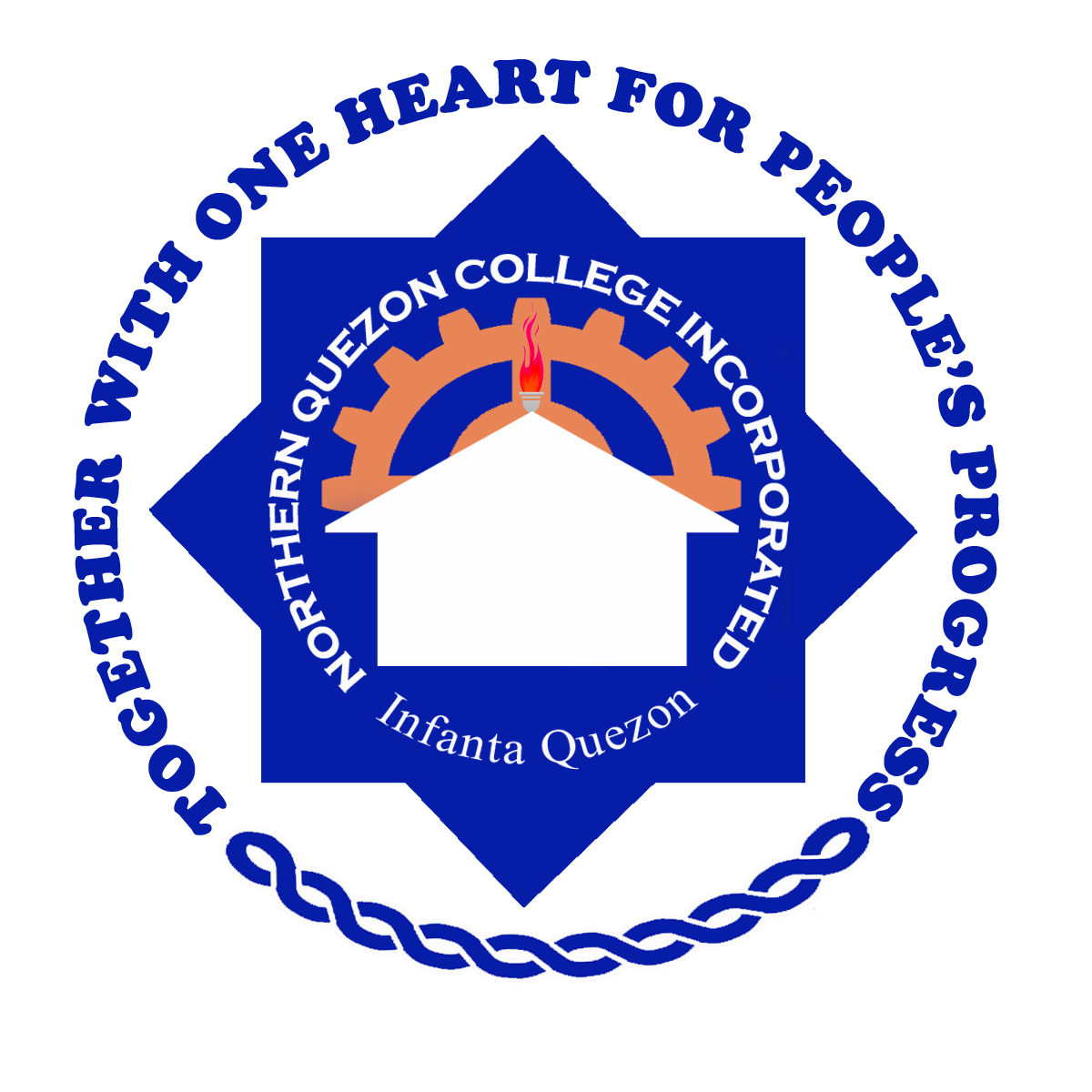
- Motto: Together with one heart for people's progress
- Type: Community College
- Established: 1988
- Faculty: Full-time permanent, probationary status part-time instructors
- Administrative staff: 28 regular non-faculty personnel,
- Students: about 2,500
- Undergraduates: 2,450
- Postgraduates: 100
- Location: Infanta, Quezon, Philippines; 14°44′17″N 121°38′40″E
- Colors: White & blue
- Website: nqci.edu.ph
- Location in Luzon Location in the Philippines

Northern Quezon College Incorporated is a college institution in Infanta, Quezon, Philippines.

== History ==
The Northern Quezon College Inc., formerly Northern Quezon Cooperative College (NQCC), Infanta Community College (ICC), started operating during the second semester of 1968–1969 with the initial enrolment of thirty eight (38) students. The management of the school was entrusted to the Division Superintendent of schools with the authority of the former Secretary of Education, Juan Manuel.

The management of the college was then entrusted to a board of trustees, composed of eleven members: the Municipal Mayor, Honorary member, President of the College, the incumbent Principal of the Infanta Provincial High School, and the division superintendent, as consultant.

The initial courses were:

1. Two year course in Associate in Arts General Curriculum leading to SB, BSE, and BSEED.
2. Associate in Commerce, 2 year Curriculum.
3. Secretarial Science

The classroom of the Infanta Provincial High Schools were used from 4:30 P.M. to 9:00 in the evening. The Infanta Community College (ICC) later acquired office and laboratory equipment and books for the library.

Qualified instructors were hired on a part-time basis from Infanta Provincial High School and other professionals within the community.

The college operated mainly from tuition fees and occasional budgetary support from the Municipality of Infanta.

In 1988, a group of civic professional groups, including the staff of Infanta Community College (ICC) organized themselves and formed the Northern Quezon Cooperative College (NQCC) and took over the management and administration of the Infanta Community College (ICC) through a resolution of the Sangguniang Bayan, introduced by one of the councilors. From the members of the Incorporators, Board of Directors, was elected to run the Cooperative.

Through an intensive membership campaign enrollment grew from fifty (50) to eighty two (82) by 1992. The NQCC management initiated various fund raising campaigns for the purpose of purchasing one (1) hectare site near the National Highway at Barangay Comon, Infanta, Quezon. A seven-room school building was constructed with separate comfort room for boys and girls.

Each classroom is furnished with blackboards, forty (40) chairs and a teacher's table. All classrooms are provided with electric lights and electric fans.

== Board of trustees ==
As of August 2017, the following is the list of BOT of Northern Quezon College, Inc.

Board of Trustees
Mr. Allan Borreo - President
Mr. Ronald Orejola - Vice President
Mr. Alejo Romantico
Mr. Roy Villaflor
Ms. Yolanda Crisostomo
Ms. Presentacion Pujeda
Ms. Ma. Luisa Avila
Ms. Emily Burgo
Mr. Juanito Gucilatar
Mr. Jaime Establecida

== Program Offerings ==
Senior High School Academics

- Accountancy, Business and Management (ABM) - Tourism, HRM, Accounting, BSBA
- Humanities and Social Sciences (HUMSS) Education, Criminology
- Science, Technology, Engineering and Mathematics (STEM) - Science, Maritime, Computer Programming, Engineering/Math

Bachelor's degree courses

- Four-Year Bachelor of Elementary Education
- Four-Year Bachelor of Secondary Education
  Major in English
  Major in Math
  Major in Social Studies
  Major in Filipino
- Four-Year Bachelor of Elementary Education
  Major in Early Childhood Education
- Four-Year Bachelor of Science in Business Administration
  Major in Financial Management
  Major in Marketing Management
  Major in Human Resource Development Management

Graduate studies

- Master of Arts in Education
  Educational Management
- Master in Business Administration in Partnership with PCU Manila
- Doctor of Education in Partnership with PCU Manila

== Gallery ==
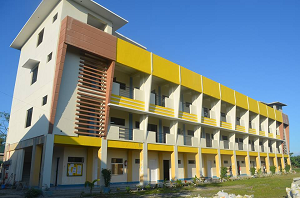
BSBA building

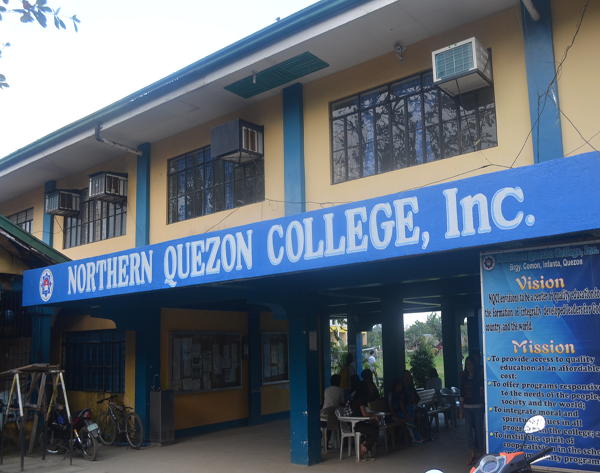
NQCI front building

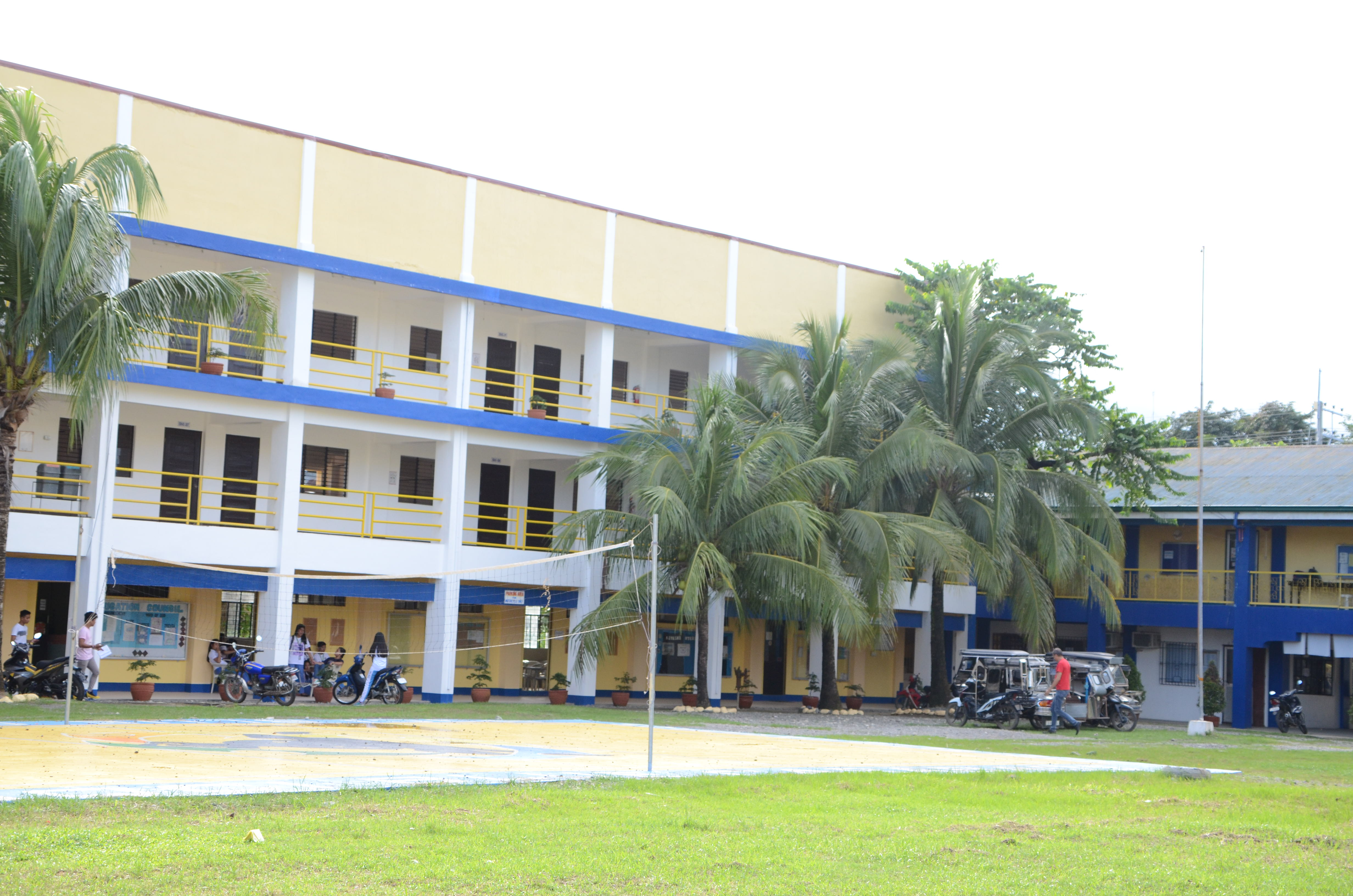
Education building

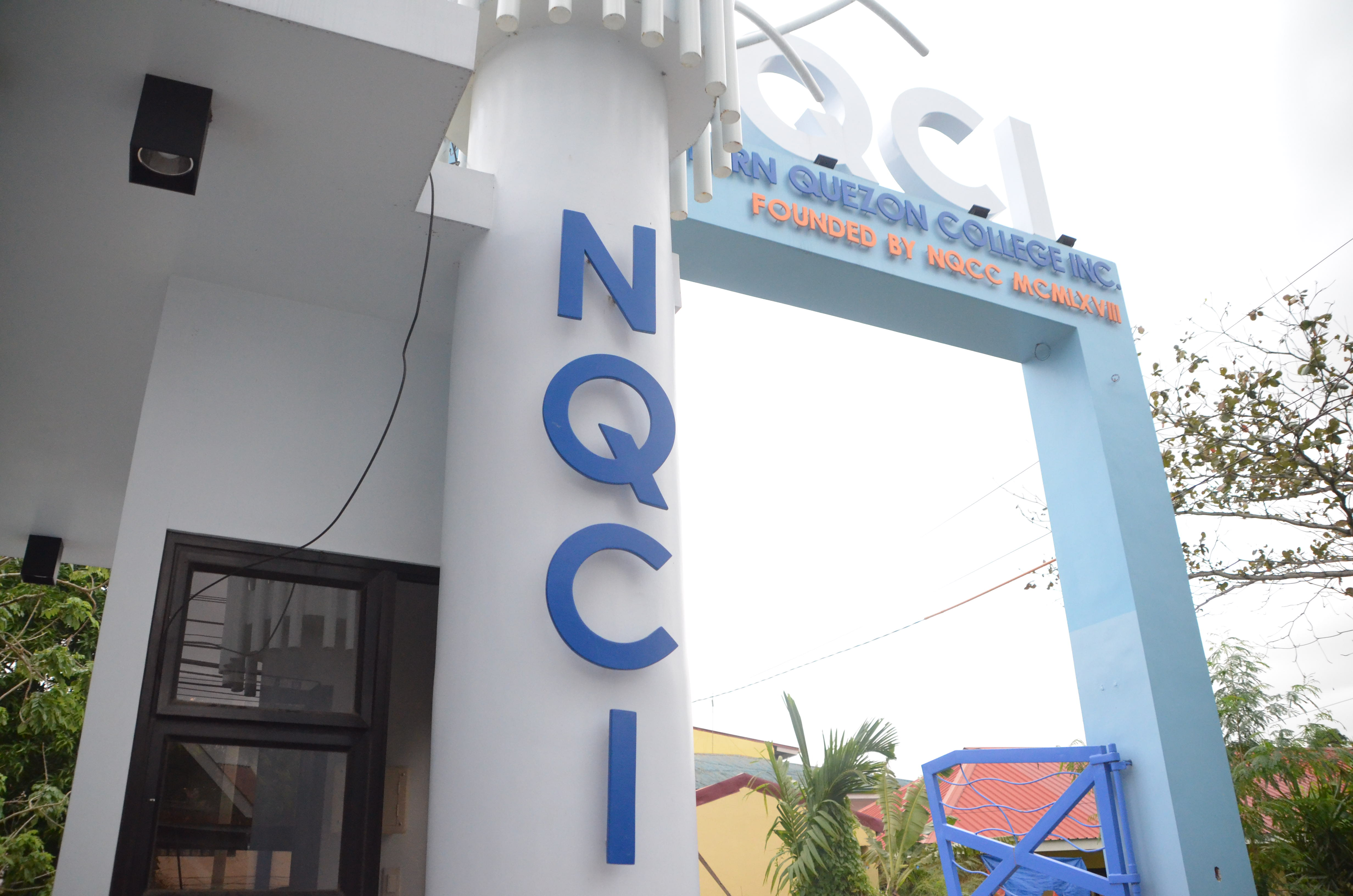
Triumphal Arch

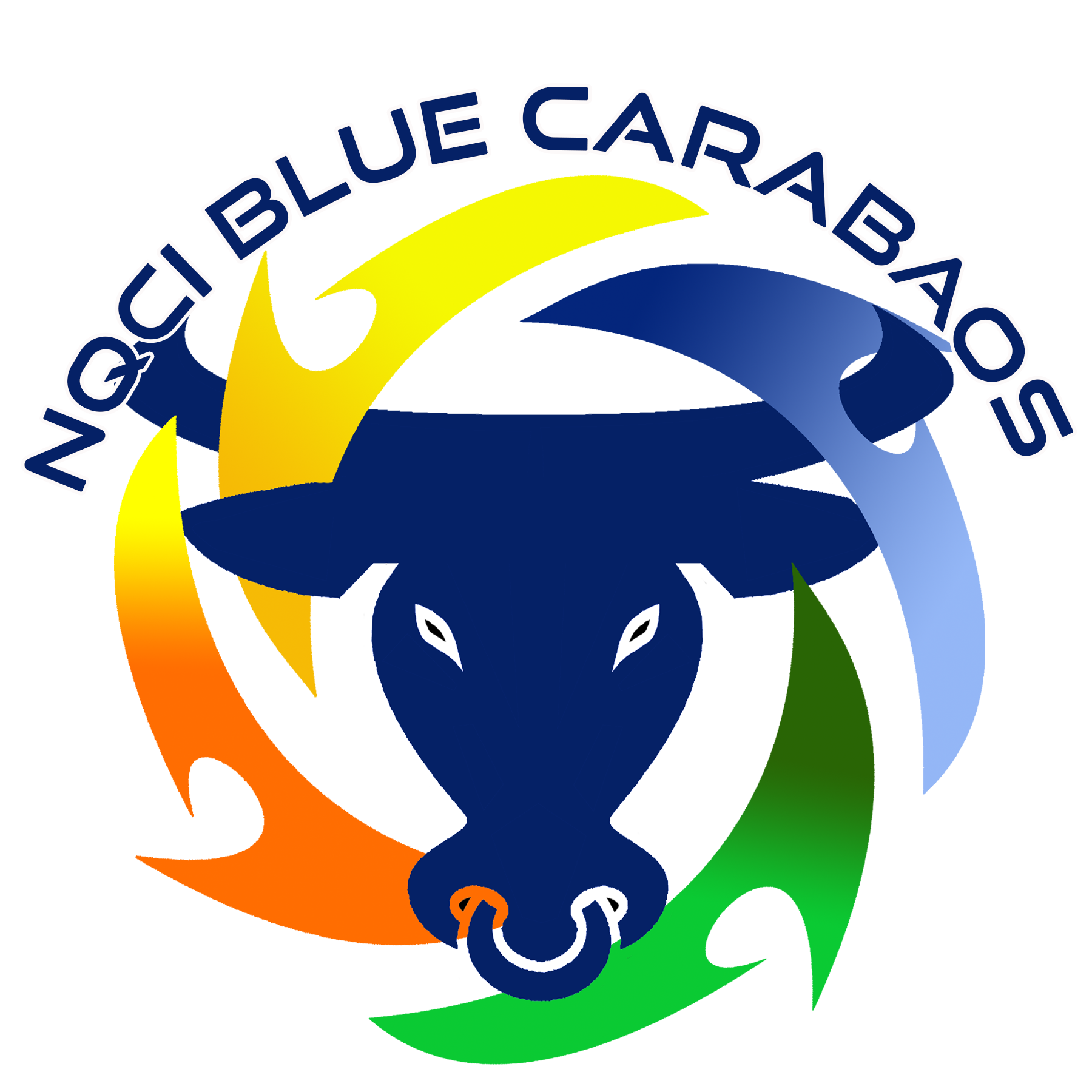
NQCI Blue Carabaos logo
