= Marcos Paulino =

Filipino politician (1871–1951)

The Honorable Marcos Paulino
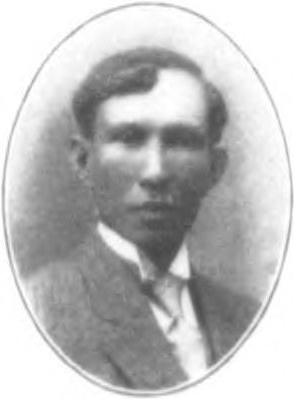
- Paulino as member of the Philippine Assembly, c. 1912

3rd Governor of Laguna
- In office 1914–1916
- Preceded by: Potenciano Malvar
- Succeeded by: Juan Cailles

Member of the Philippine Assembly from Laguna's 1st district
- In office December 20, 1910 – October 16, 1912
- Preceded by: Potenciano Malvar
- Succeeded by: Serviliano Platon

Municipal President of San Pablo, Laguna
- In office 1902–1906

Personal details
- Born: October 7, 1871 San Pablo, La Laguna, Captaincy General of the Philippines
- Died: February 5, 1951 (aged 79) San Miguel, Manila, Philippines
- Party: Progresista
- Spouse: Dionisia Hernández
- Children: 4
- Education: Ateneo de Manila University; Colegio de San Juan de Letran

Marcos Alcos Paulino (October 7, 1871 – February 5, 1951) was a Filipino politician who served as 3rd governor of Laguna from 1914 to 1916. He also represented the first district of Laguna at the Philippine Assembly from 1910 to 1912.

== Biography ==
=== Early life and education ===
Paulino was born on October 7, 1851 in San Pablo, La Laguna (now Laguna), to Carlos Paulino and Paula Alcos. He studied in Colegio de San Juan de Letran and Ateneo Municipal de Manila.

=== Political career ===
Paulino became a municipal president in San Pablo, La Laguna in 1902. In the 1910 special election, Paulino won against Serviliano Platon by 483 votes to become the assemblyman for La Laguna's 1st district.

In 1914, Paulino became the governor of La Laguna, serving until 1916.

=== Death ===
Paulino died on February 5, 1951 at Singian Clinic (now Singian Memorial Hospital) in San Miguel, Manila.

== Personal life ==
Paulino was married to Dionisia Hernández and has four children.

== Legacy ==
Marcos Paulino Avenue is a major throughfare in San Pablo, Laguna, forming part of the old Manila South Road alignment.
