= Infanta, Quezon =

Infanta
- Municipality
- Municipality of Infanta
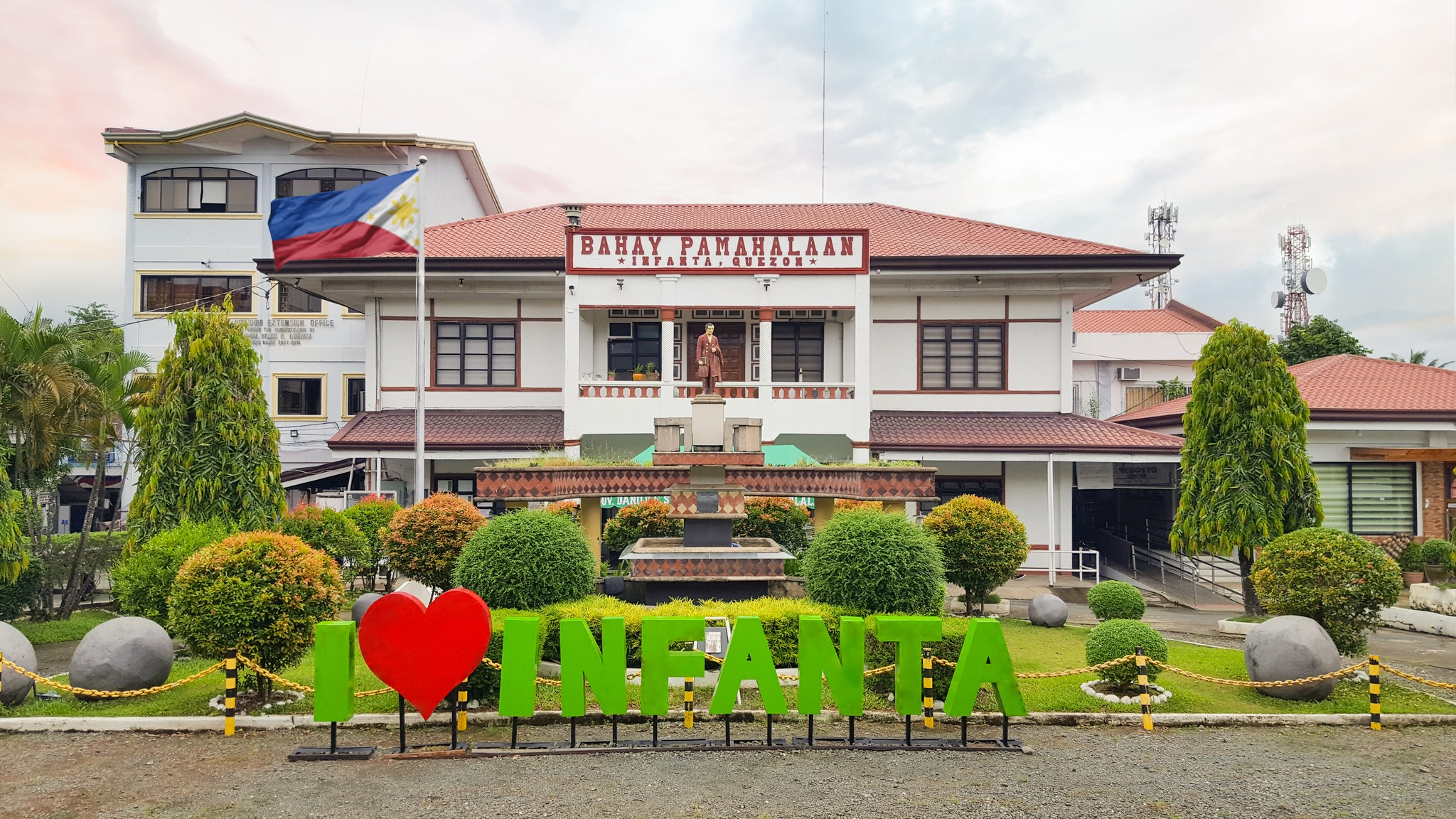
- Infanta Municipal Hall

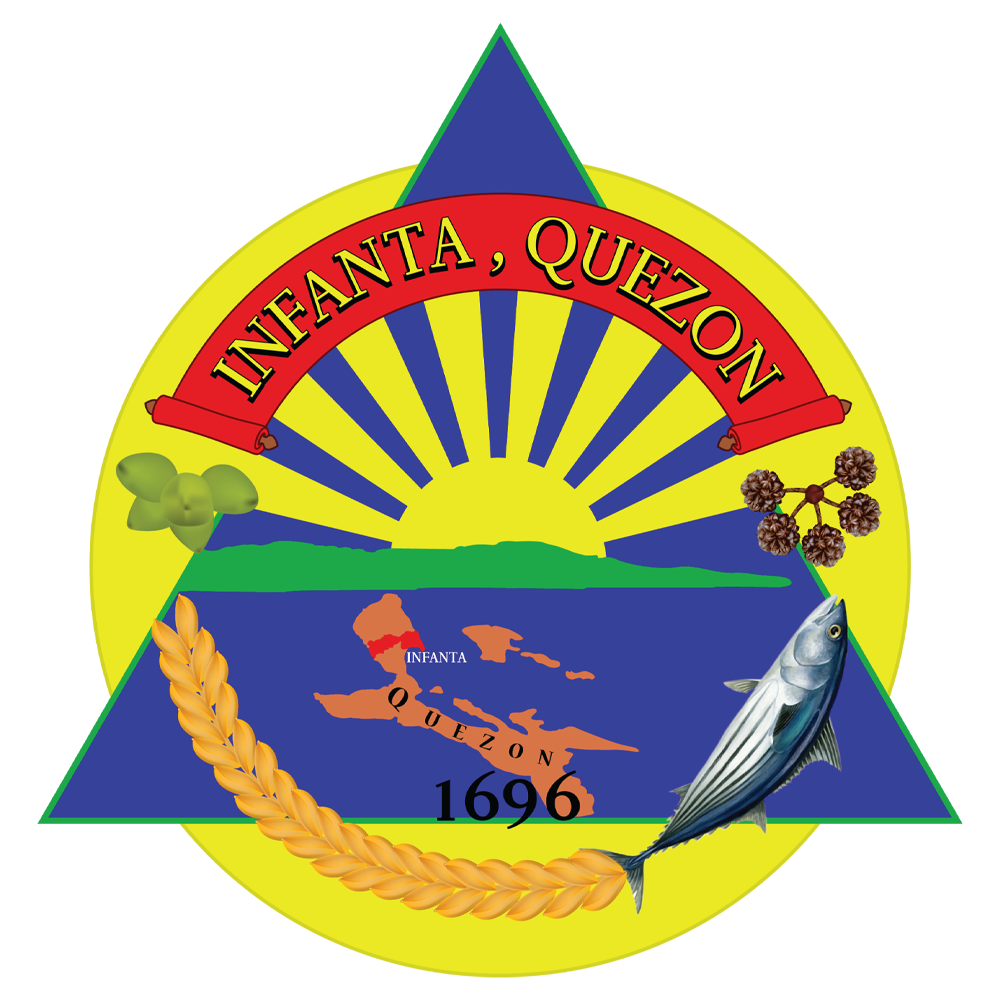
- Seal
- Nickname: Gateway to the Pacific
- Motto(s): Infantahin, Kaya Natin!!! (Infanta, We Can Do It)
- Anthem: Mabuhay ka, Infanta (English: Long live, Infanta)
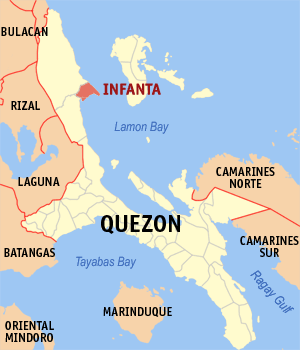
- Map of Quezon with Infanta highlighted
- Interactive map of Infanta
- Location within the Philippines Infanta (Philippines)
- Coordinates: 14°44′33″N 121°38′58″E
- Country: Philippines
- Region: Calabarzon
- Province: Quezon
- District: 1st district
- Founded: April 25, 1696
- Named for: Isabella Clara Eugenia, Infanta of Spain
- Barangays: 36 (see Barangays)

Government
  - Type: Sangguniang Bayan
  - Mayor: Lord Arnel Ruanto
  - Vice Mayor: Bro. Mannie America
  - Representative: Wilfrido Mark M. Enverga (Nationalist People's Coalition)
  - Municipal Council: Members: Tim Juntereal; Sherwin Avellano; Owie Cuento; Laiza Ramos; Cherry Macasaet; Jun Jun Mortiz; Anlo Cuento; Ronald Yu
  - Electorate: 47,047 voters (2025)

Area
  - Total: 342.76 km^{2} (132.34 sq mi)
- Highest elevation: 1,523 m (4,997 ft)
- Lowest elevation: 0 m (0 ft)

Population (2024 census)
  - Total: 77,676
  - Density: 226.62/km^{2} (586.94/sq mi)
  - Households: 19,125
- Demonym: Infantahin

Economy
  - Income class: 1st municipal income class
  - Poverty incidence: 5.2% (2023)
  - Revenue: ₱ 357.1 million (2024)
  - Assets: ₱ 896.5 million (2024)
  - Expenditure: ₱ 169.2 million (2024)
  - Liabilities: ₱ 97.86 million (2024)

Service provider
  - Electricity: Quezon 2 Electric Cooperative (QUEZELCO 2)
- Time zone: UTC+8 (PST)
- ZIP code: 4336
- PSGC: 0405620000
- IDD : area code: +63 (0)42
- Native languages: Umiray Dumaget; Tagalog
- Website: www.infanta.gov.ph

Infanta, officially the Municipality of Infanta (Tagalog: Bayan ng Infanta, Ilocano: Ili ti Infanta), is a municipality in the province of Quezon, Philippines. According to the 2024 census, it has a population of 77,676 people.

It is known as the largest lambanog manufacturer in the province of Quezon. The town is also known for its giant mountain snail locally known as bayugo dishes. The municipality is nicknamed as "the Gateway to the Pacific".

== Etymology ==
The name Infanta comes from the title Infanta of Spain, which is a title given to the daughters of the Spanish monarch or the heir apparent. The town was named after the eldest daughter of Philip II of Spain (the namesake of the Philippines), the Infanta Isabella Clara Eugenia, later Sovereign and Governess of the Spanish Netherlands.

Before the Spanish colonization, this place was known as Binangonan by its first peoples, the Dumagats. Binangonan is a Dumagat word pertaining to a sacred place where a bangon ("sacred name") was given by the Sobkal (Bobo a Laki) to an infant.

== History ==
In the year 1578, the venerable and zealous Fray Esteban Ortíz planted the consoling sign of the Cross in this town, who toured the east coast of the island in an expanse of more than sixty leagues, while the shortage of missionaries at that time did not allow the continued assistance of a minister until the year of 1609, with the holy martyr Fray Blas Palomino undertaking anew its conversion, formalized this town and was its first minister.

After the years of 1658, the administration of this town was ceded from Franciscan mission to the Augustinian Recollects until they ceded it back to the Franciscans in the year 1703.

The Church, dedicated to Saint Mark the Evangelist, was of bamboo cane and nipa until the year 1732, by which time it was burnt down and the existing one was built, which is made of stone, but roofed with nipa, and the same as the parish house, which serves as a tribunal. There is a school of primary education, endowed by the funds of the community; about six hundred wooden houses and many others from bamboo, distributed in its twenty-eight barrios, some of them quite far from the Church.

=== State Of The Parish ===
Spanish era writers said of the town:

This village has no limits. In their lengthy and lush forests are all kinds of woods for construction and cabinetry, of the best quality: many and good pastures for cattle and horses; variety of palms, canes and reeds, with plenty of fruit and rootcrops: abundant hunting buffalo, boar, deer and fowl, with much wax and honey. There is also a quarry of granite stone, discovered the year of 1849 by Fray Antonio del Moral. A little distant from the town exists a safe harbor for ships of high board, but its entry is dangerous to the inexperienced, and from October to March is risky to navigate the coast because of the strong northerly winds that blow. The land reduced to cultivation produces abundant crops of rice, maize, sugarcane, cocoa, coffee and sweet potato. The abaca was planted for the first time in the year 1851 by Fray Antonio del Moral, and gave so happy results that today that its increasing cultivation is continued with large activity and benefit. Its natives are engaged in agriculture, the harvest of the abaca, the nipa wine, whose palm abounds in its land; the breeding of cattle, in the hunting and fishing, whose products, with the excess of other agricultural products, is exported in medium-sized boats to the town of Mauban, in the province of Tayabas and to the towns of Paracale and Mambulao, returning gold dust after being brought to the Capital.

Below are the Religious Franciscans ministered in Binangonan de Lampon after Fray Ortíz and Fray Palomino:

Franciscan Friar	Position	Year
Bernardino de la Concepción	Confessor	1617
Juan de Mansilla	Confessor	1619
Lorenzo Valdés	Confessor	1632
Vicente Pilas or San José	Preacher	1639
Dionisio de la Concepción	Confessor	1652
Pedro de Alburquerque	Preacher	1653 / 1659
Baltasar of San Diego	Confessor	1659
Juan Antonio dela Purificación	del Moral	1727-1731
Nicolás Valverde or de Jesús	Confessor	1741 / 1765
Vicente Mars	Preacher	1758
Manuel de Sacedón	Preacher	1758
José de Jesús or de San Esteban	Chorister	1759
Julián de Madrid	Preacher	1760
Manuel de San Ramón	Confessor	1768
Atanasio Argovejo de Jesús María	Preacher	1774
José Engracio de Alarilla	Preacher	1785
Juan Moveno	Preacher	1811
Tomás Pobeda	Preacher	1823
Baltasar Barceló de San Antonio	Preacher	1825
Antonio Huertas Felipe	del Moral	1848-1853
Lucas Martínez	Preacher	1864
Cirilo Sanz	Preacher	1867-1869
Francisco Arriaga	Preacher	1883

=== Spanish Colonial Era ===
In 1578, more than half a century after Ferdinand Magellan and his men landed in Cebu and thirteen years after Miguel López de Legazpi founded the first Spanish settlement also in Cebu, a Spanish priest named Esteban Ortíz arrived in Binangonan de Lampon and planted a wooden cross symbolizing the introduction of Spanish colonial rule at the place. In 1696, Don Diego Mangilaya, a native chieftain developed the settlement.

Since its establishment, the area has been attacked by Moro pirates, and visited by typhoons and cholera epidemics as recent as 2004. In 1803, Captain Pedro de León affiliated Binangonan de Lampon to the province of Nueva Ecija and in 1850, Kapitan Rafael Orozco withdrew Infanta from the province of Nueva Ecija and joined it with the province of Laguna to the west.

==== District of Infanta ====
Map of the historical District of Infanta in 1856-1902 when its territories were annexed to Tayabas (Quezon).

Map of the district of Infanta in 1899.

The municipality of Infanta was part of the Distrito de La Infanta, which was established by a decree of the Superior Government issued on March 18, 1858.

See: Distrito de La Infanta

=== Philippine Revolution ===
On July 20, 1898, a group of Infanta Katipuneros headed by Colonel Pablo Astilla attacked the Spanish forces holed up at the limestone convent and after several days of siege and fighting, the Spanish soldiers surrendered.

=== American Colonial Era ===
By virtue of the December 10, 1898 Paris Treaty of Peace, American soldiers occupied the town of Infanta and appointed Kapitan Carlos Ruidera Azcárraga as the first "town presidente." He was followed by Rufino Ortíz in 1903 who withdrew Infanta from the province of Laguna and joined it to the province of Tayabas. He also ordered the planting of coconut trees in the barrios (now barangays) of Infanta. During the administration of town "presidente" Gregorio Rutaquio (1911–1916), he constructed the "Gabaldón type" of school house. In 1917-1919, Agustin Pumarada served as the town president. From 1923 to 1928, Don Florencio Potes became town "presidente". He constructed the concrete municipal building and the first telegraph office of the town. From 1935 to 1939, Mr. Fabián Sollesa served as town "presidente". During his incumbency, the Infanta-Famy Road traversing the Sierra Madre from Infanta to Laguna and Rizal provinces was constructed. Also, piped water from a spring reservoir in barrio (barangay) Gumian was installed.

=== Japanese Occupation ===
In December 1941 the Japanese Imperial forces occupied the town of Infanta. On May 25, 1945, the liberation by combined Filipino and American soldiers entered in the town was supported by the guerrilla fighters fought the Japanese Imperial forces until the end of World War II.

=== Creation of two municipalities and religious territory ===
On July 21, 1949, the municipality of General Nakar was created from the territory of Infanta.

The following year, in 1950, Infanta gained religious significance when it was designated as the seat of the Roman Catholic Territorial Prelature of Infanta.

Later, Infanta underwent another territorial change when barangay Real was separated and established as an independent municipality on June 22, 1963.

=== Legend ===
According to the legend, the people who established the first settlement in the land that became Infanta were led by an elder named Nunong Karugtong. These settlers crossed the Sierra Madre Mountains from somewhere in what is now Rizal Province in search of better living conditions. After examining multiple sites, they eventually settled on a site near the Bantilan River, where the discovery of a huge Yam root convinced them that the site was ideal for settlement. This eventually became the site of the settlement which European colonizers would call Binangonan de Lampon which in turn would eventually become the Municipality of Infanta.

== Geography ==
The Municipality of Infanta has a land area of 130.1 square kilometers (50.2 sq mi), representing 1.5% of the area of Quezon.

Infanta is situated 129.64 kilometres (80.55 mi) from the provincial capital Lucena, and 132.88 kilometres (82.57 mi) from the country's capital city of Manila. It is accessible to Metro Manila through the Marcos Highway.

=== Barangays ===
Infanta is politically subdivided into 36 barangays. Each barangay consists of puroks and some have sitios. There are six barangays which are considered urban (highlighted in bold).

- Abiawin
- Agos Agos
- Alitas
- Amolongin
- Anibong
- Antikin
- Bacong
- Balobo
- Banugao
- Batican
- Binonoan
- Binulasan
- Boboin
- Catambungan
- Cawaynin
- **Comon**
- **Dinahican**
- Gumian
- Ilog
- Ingas
- Langgas
- Libjo
- Lual
- Magsaysay
- Maypulot
- Miswa
- Pilaway
- Pinaglapatan
- **Poblacion 1**
- **Poblacion 38**
- **Poblacion 39**
- **Poblacion Bantilan**
- Pulo
- Silangan
- Tongohin
- Tudturan

=== Climate ===
Climate data for Infanta (1991–2020, extremes 1949–2023)
Month	Jan	Feb	Mar	Apr	May	Jun	Jul	Aug	Sep	Oct	Nov	Dec	Year
Record high °C (°F)	34.6 (94.3)	34.1 (93.4)	34.5 (94.1)	37.2 (99.0)	37.8 (100.0)	37.8 (100.0)	38.1 (100.6)	37.7 (99.9)	37.0 (98.6)	36.5 (97.7)	34.5 (94.1)	32.8 (91.0)	38.1 (100.6)
Mean daily maximum °C (°F)	28.0 (82.4)	28.6 (83.5)	30.0 (86.0)	31.8 (89.2)	33.2 (91.8)	33.5 (92.3)	32.7 (90.9)	32.8 (91.0)	32.5 (90.5)	31.1 (88.0)	29.9 (85.8)	28.4 (83.1)	31.0 (87.8)
Daily mean °C (°F)	25.2 (77.4)	25.4 (77.7)	26.5 (79.7)	27.9 (82.2)	29.0 (84.2)	29.2 (84.6)	28.7 (83.7)	28.8 (83.8)	28.5 (83.3)	27.5 (81.5)	26.9 (80.4)	25.7 (78.3)	27.5 (81.5)
Mean daily minimum °C (°F)	22.4 (72.3)	22.3 (72.1)	23.0 (73.4)	24.1 (75.4)	24.8 (76.6)	24.9 (76.8)	24.6 (76.3)	24.9 (76.8)	24.5 (76.1)	24.0 (75.2)	23.8 (74.8)	23.1 (73.6)	23.9 (75.0)
Record low °C (°F)	17.4 (63.3)	17.4 (63.3)	16.4 (61.5)	18.1 (64.6)	20.5 (68.9)	20.5 (68.9)	20.5 (68.9)	20.8 (69.4)	20.0 (68.0)	20.0 (68.0)	17.4 (63.3)	18.0 (64.4)	16.4 (61.5)
Average rainfall mm (inches)	348.9 (13.74)	289.0 (11.38)	220.7 (8.69)	175.0 (6.89)	203.7 (8.02)	233.4 (9.19)	265.6 (10.46)	193.0 (7.60)	251.1 (9.89)	498.6 (19.63)	561.8 (22.12)	746.3 (29.38)	3,987.1 (156.97)
Average rainy days (≥ 1 mm)	22	15	14	11	13	15	16	13	15	21	23	25	203
Average relative humidity (%)	89	88	87	84	83	82	83	82	84	87	89	90	86
Source: PAGASA

== Demographics ==
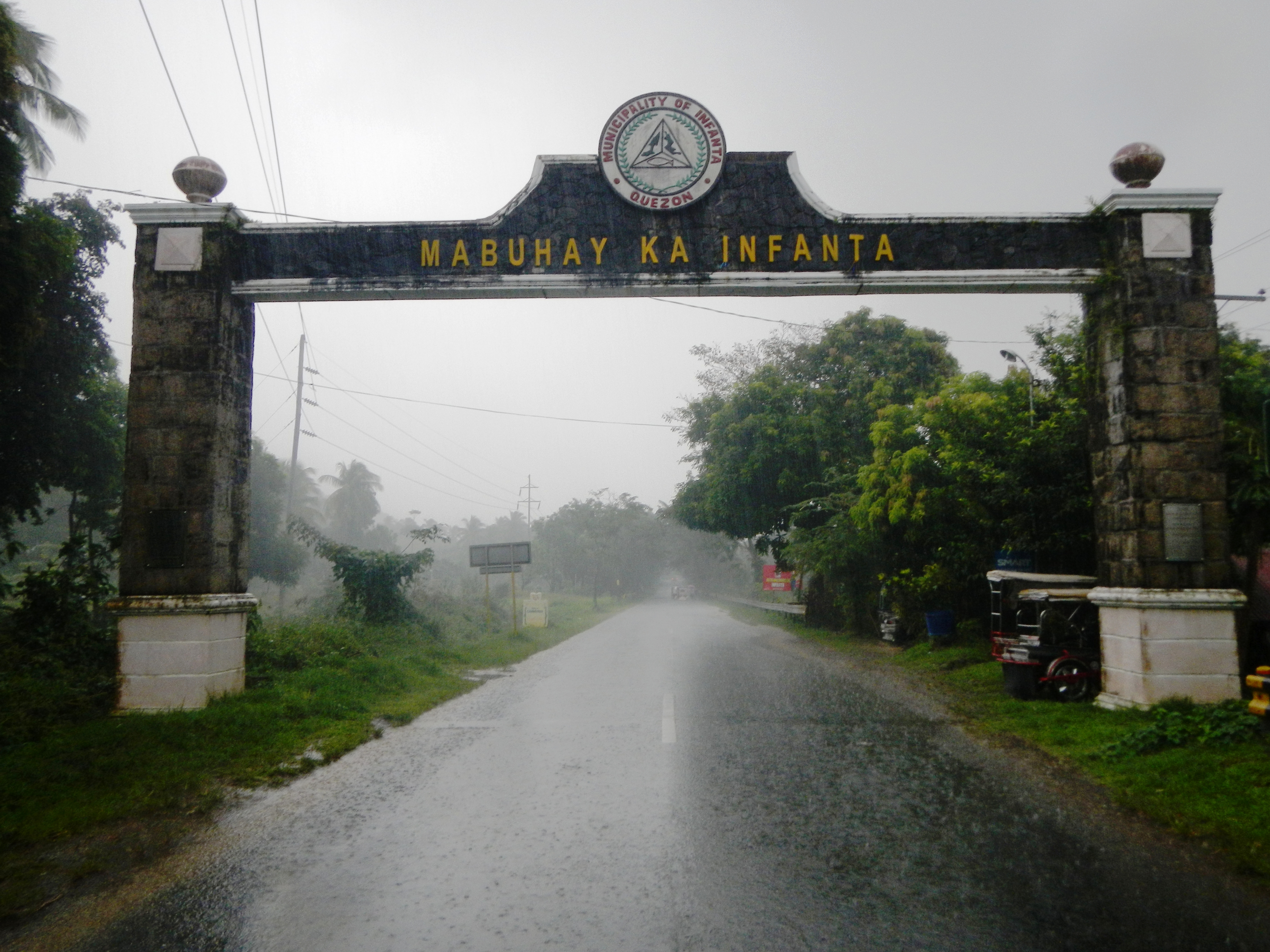
Welcome arch

Population census of Infanta

Year	Pop.	±% p.a.
1903	10,283	—
1918	15,860	+2.93%
1939	20,331	+1.19%
1948	19,006	−0.75%
1960	21,868	+1.18%
1970	21,653	−0.10%
1975	25,271	+3.15%
1980	27,814	+1.94%

Year	Pop.	±% p.a.
1990	35,564	+2.49%
1995	39,772	+2.12%
2000	50,992	+5.47%
2007	60,346	+2.35%
2010	64,818	+2.64%
2015	69,079	+1.22%
2020	76,186	+2.08%
2024	77,676	+0.47%

Source: Philippine Statistics Authority

== Economy ==
Poverty incidence of Infanta (%)

Source: Philippine Statistics Authority

The town is currently undergoing preparations for establishing a bayugo breeding center that would supply bayugo to townsfolk. The move is intended to stop the decline of bayugo in the wild. Also it is the center of economic activity in the northern part of Quezon.

== Education ==
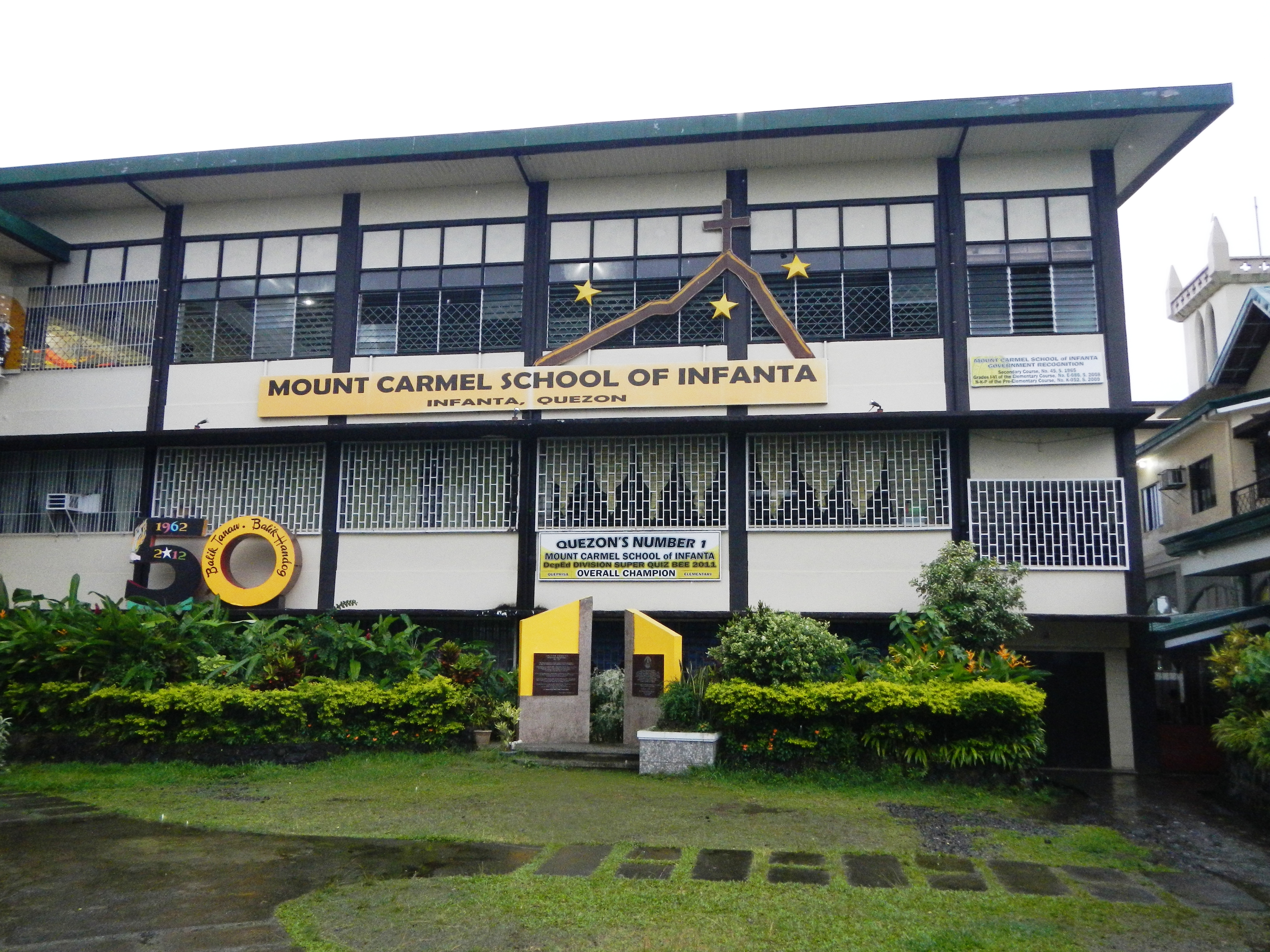
Mount Carmel School of Infanta

The Infanta Schools District Office governs all educational institutions within the municipality. It oversees the management and operations of all private and public elementary and high schools.

Infanta is the center of educative learning, with four colleges that attract many students to study from nearby towns of Real, General Nakar, Polillo, Panukulan, Burdeos, Patnanungan and Jomalig.

=== Primary and elementary schools ===
- Abiawin Elementary School
- Agos-Agos Elementary School
- Alitas Elementary School
- Banugao Elementary School
- Binonoan Elementary School
- Cacawayan Elementary School
- Dinahican Elementary School
- Disciples Christian School
- Gumian Elementary School
- Infanta Central School
- Kiborosa Elementary School
- Learnpoint Kiddie School
- LFJ Cornerstone Academy
- Libjo Elementary School
- Lual Elementary School
- Magsaysay Elementary School
- Miyunod Elementary School
- Mount Carmel School
- New Little Baguio ES
- Picab Elementary School
- Star of Hope Christian School
- Stepstone Christian Academy
- The Jesus Christ Worldwide Montessori
- Tongohin Elementary School
- Tudturan Elementary School

=== Secondary schools ===
- Binulasan Integrated School
- Infanta National High School
- Langgas National High School
- Little Friends of Jesus Corner Stone Academy
- Mount Carmel School of Infanta
- Tongohin National High School

=== Higher educational institutions ===
- ACTS Computer College
- Northern Quezon College
- Rizal Marine Technological College
- Southern Luzon State University

== Media ==
=== FM Stations ===
- 92.7 Spirit FM (Catholic Media Network)
- 94.3 Brigada News FM (Brigada Mass Media Corporation)
- 95.9 DABIG C Radio (Prime Broadcasting Network)
- 105.3 Radyo Natin (Manila Broadcasting Company/Radyo Natin Network)

=== Cable and Satellite ===
- Infanta Cable TV Network
- Cignal TV

== Town's Hymn ==
The Hymn of the Town of Infanta is entitled "Mabuhay Ka Infanta" written by the alumni of Mount Carmel School of Infanta.

== Notable ==
- Guillermo Nakar
- Pablo Astilla
