= Real, Quezon =

Municipality in Quezon, Philippines

Real
- Municipality
- Municipality of Real
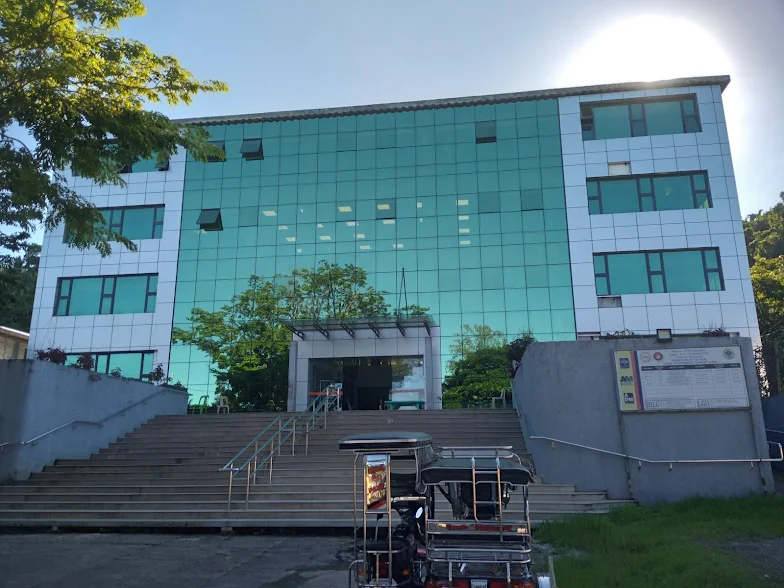
- Real Municipal Hall

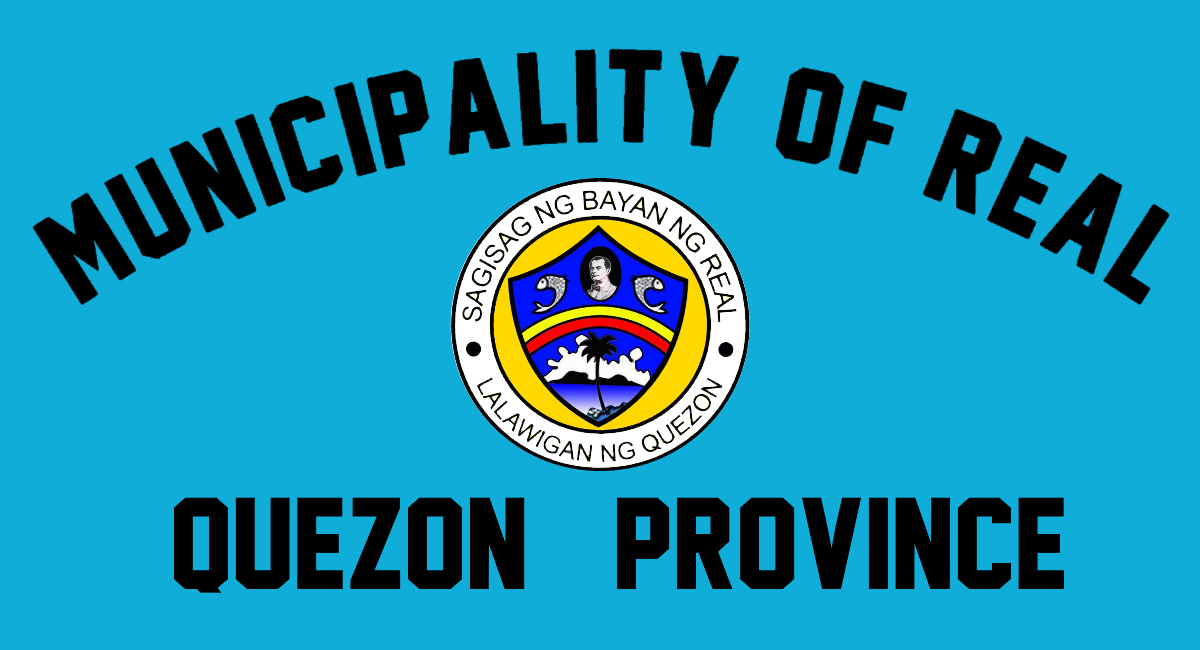
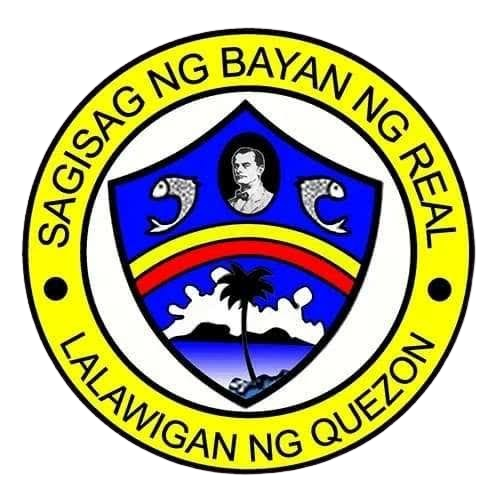
- Flag Seal

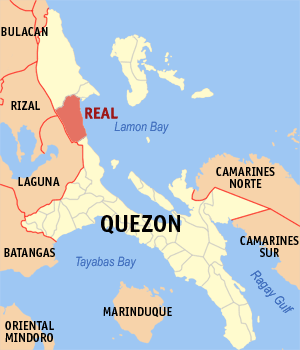
- Map of Quezon with Real highlighted
- Interactive map of Real
- Location within the Philippines
- Coordinates: 14°40′N 121°36′E
- Country: Philippines
- Region: Calabarzon
- Province: Quezon
- District: 1st district
- Founded: December 15, 1960
- Conversion to Municipality: June 22, 1963
- Barangays: 17 (see Barangays)

Government
  - Type: Sangguniang Bayan
  - Mayor: Hon. Julie Ann O. Macasaet
  - Vice Mayor: Hon. Diana Abigail Diestro-Aquino
  - Representative: Wilfrido Mark M. Enverga
  - Municipal Council: Members: Asis-Poblete, Jenra; Isidro, Ronald; Atendido, Kayzie; Avanica, Michelle; Castro, Darius; Almonte, Seth; Peñamante, Amelie; Calleja, Lea
  - Electorate: 25,009 voters (2025)

Area
  - Total: 563.89 km^{2} (217.72 sq mi)
- Elevation: 137 m (449 ft)
- Highest elevation: 1,078 m (3,537 ft)
- Lowest elevation: 0 m (0 ft)

Population (2024 census)
  - Total: 39,969
  - Density: 70.881/km^{2} (183.58/sq mi)
  - Households: 9,799
- Demonym: Realeño

Economy
  - Income class: 1st municipal income class
  - Poverty incidence: 6.7% (2023)
  - Revenue: ₱ 318.4 million (2024)
  - Assets: ₱ 930.9 million (2024)
  - Expenditure: ₱ 138 million (2024)
  - Liabilities: ₱ 273.9 million (2024)

Service provider
  - Electricity: Quezon 2 Electric Cooperative (QUEZELCO 2)
- Time zone: UTC+8 (PST)
- ZIP code: 4335
- PSGC: 0405638000
- IDD : area code: +63 (0)42
- Native languages: Hatang Kayi; Tagalog
- Website: www.realquezon.gov.ph

Real (/reɪ.ˈɑːl/, ray-AHL), officially the Municipality of Real (Tagalog: Bayan ng Real), is a municipality in the province of Quezon, Philippines. According to the 2024 census, it has a population of 39,969 people.

This coastal town, located on the eastern shores of Luzon facing the Philippine Sea, is noted for its rural beach resorts.

== Etymology ==
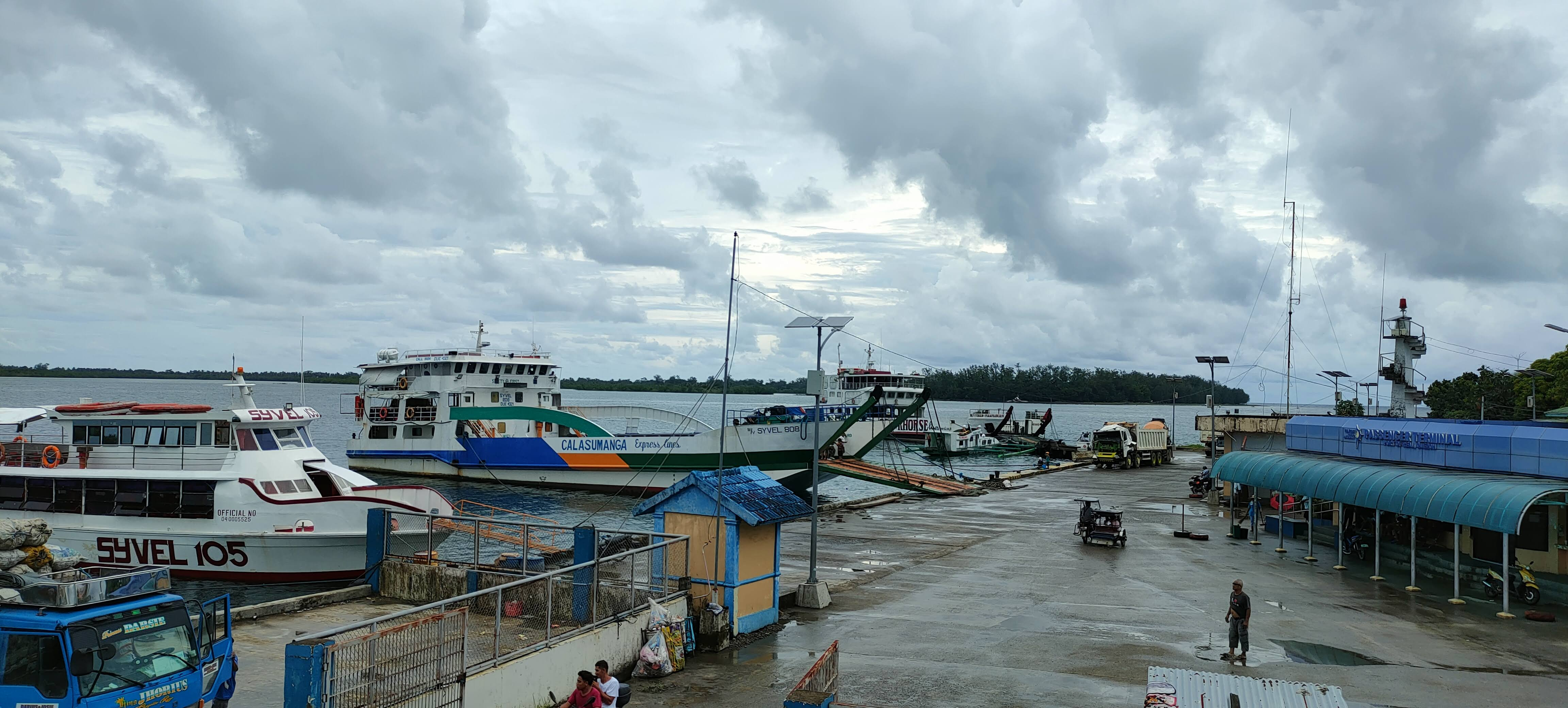
Port of Real

The origin of the name Real has no traditional folklore as basis. Its name originated from the arrival of Spanish forces in the place during their regime. They incorporated the area into their territory, naming it “Puerto Real” (lit. transl. Royal Port), where the name of the municipality was derived. Spanish galleons and ships docked at the port, while reinforced forces were stationed at the capital of Binangonan de Lampon (now Infanta).

== History ==
Historically, the municipality of Real was under the jurisdiction of Binangonan de Lampon, a "pueblo" of Distrito de La Infanta. This district was established by a decree issued by the Superior Government on March 18, 1858.

Spanish forces landed at the site of Real early in the colonization period, calling it "San Rafael". Spanish galleons and ships docked at the port "Puerto Real De Lampon" reinforced forces stationed at the nearby place "Binangonan de Lampon", now known as Infanta. Located at the coast of Polillo Strait, it was frequently vulnerable to attacks by Muslim sea pirates and bandits.

The area later became part of Nueva Ecija in 1803, later of Laguna, and finally of Tayabas (renamed Quezon in 1946).

On December 15, 1960, Real was created into a municipal district, comprising the barrios of Llavac, Cawayan, Capalong, Tignoan, Kiloloron, Lubayat and Pandan from the mother town of Infanta by virtue of Executive Order No. 410. It was later converted to a regular municipality through Republic Act No. 3754 dated June 22, 1963.

On November 29, 2004, Real was hit hard by Typhoons Winnie, Violeta, and Yoyong. About 500 people were either killed or missing.

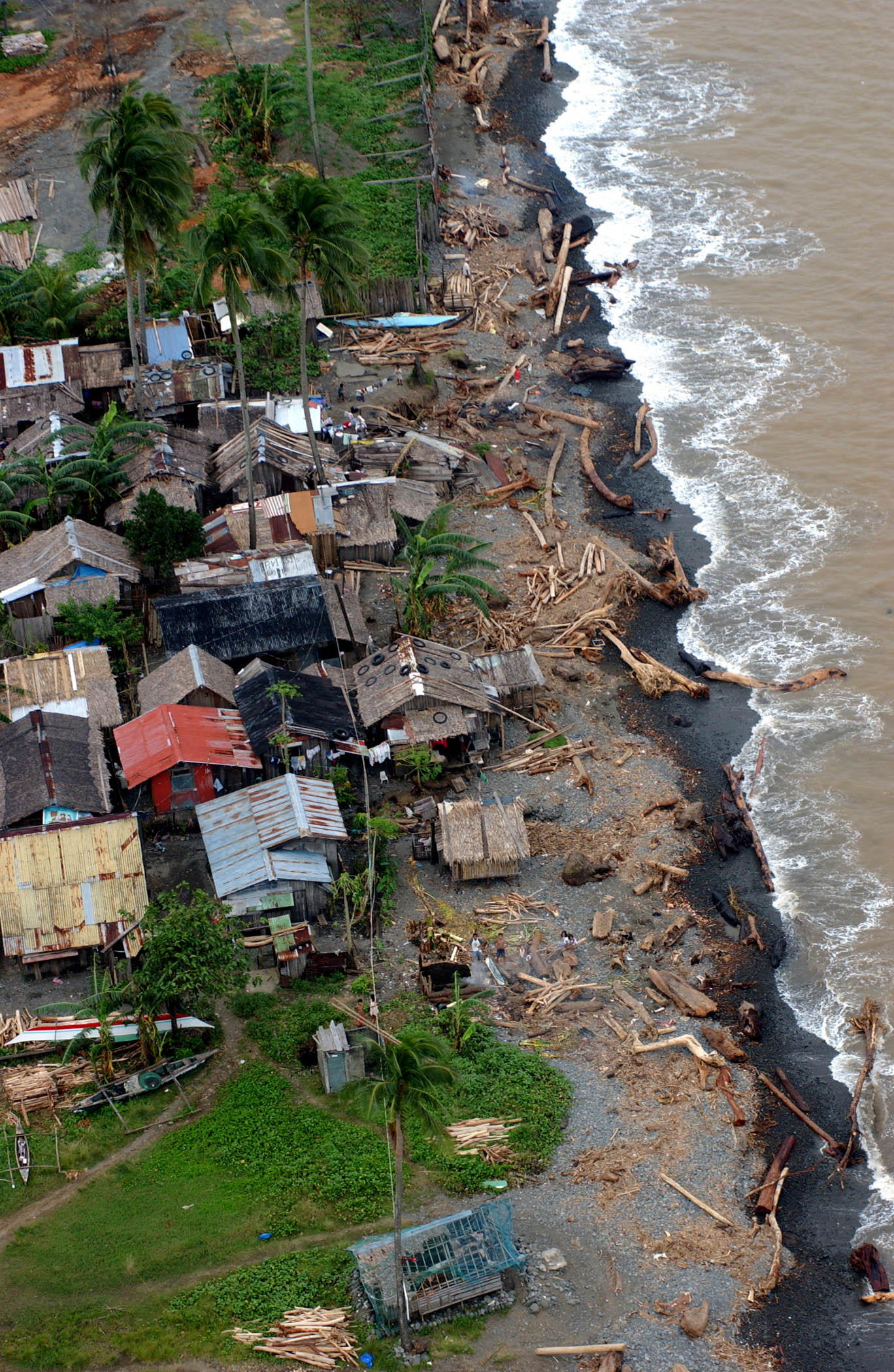
Typhoon damage in December 2004

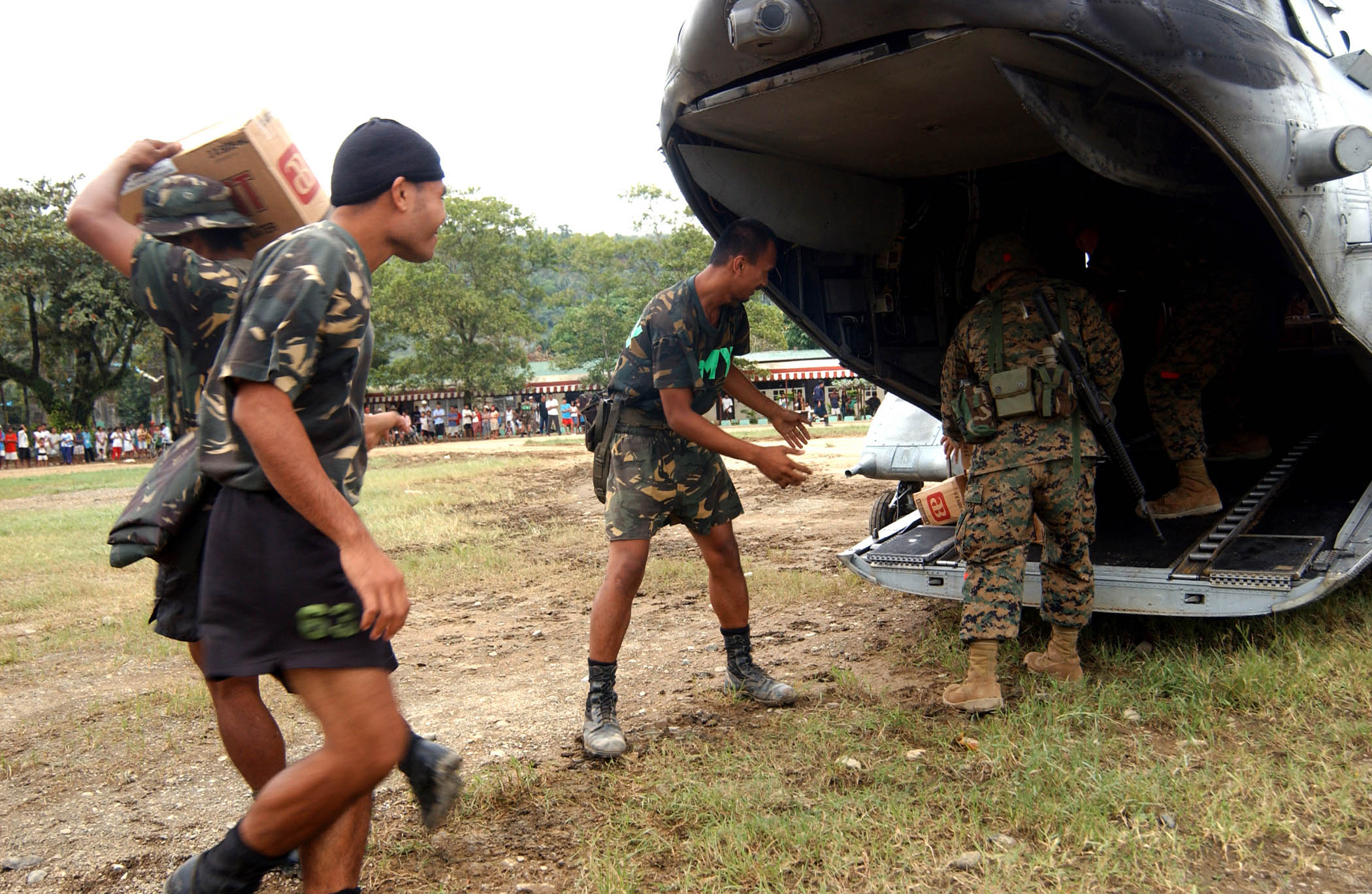
Relief aid delivery in Real, December 2004

== Geography ==
Real is a small town by the Lamon Bay, facing the Pacific Ocean. It is 123 kilometers (76 mi) from the provincial capital Lucena and 127 kilometers (79 mi) from Manila. Real has 17 barangays: 14 rural and 3 urban. Its total land area is 563.8 square kilometers (217.7 sq mi), the second largest in the province.

Tourist spots include coastal and zigzag road views, Balagbag Falls, river scenery, and Baluti Peninsula (Baluti Island). It also has tourist-frequented beaches known for surfing.

=== Barangays ===
Real is politically subdivided into 17 barangays, as indicated below. Each barangay consists of puroks and some have sitios.

- Bagong Silang
- Capalong
- Cawayan
- Kiloloron
- Llavac
- Lubayat
- Malapad
- Maragondon
- Masikap
- Maunlad
- Pandan
- Poblacion 61 (Barangay 2)
- Poblacion I (Barangay 1)
- Tagumpay
- Tanauan
- Tignoan
- Ungos

=== Climate ===
Climate data for Real, Quezon
| Month | Jan | Feb | Mar | Apr | May | Jun | Jul | Aug | Sep | Oct | Nov | Dec | Year |
|---|---|---|---|---|---|---|---|---|---|---|---|---|---|
| Mean daily maximum °C (°F) | 26 (79) | 27 (81) | 28 (82) | 31 (88) | 31 (88) | 30 (86) | 29 (84) | 29 (84) | 29 (84) | 29 (84) | 28 (82) | 27 (81) | 29 (84) |
| Mean daily minimum °C (°F) | 22 (72) | 22 (72) | 22 (72) | 23 (73) | 25 (77) | 25 (77) | 25 (77) | 25 (77) | 24 (75) | 24 (75) | 23 (73) | 22 (72) | 24 (74) |
| Average precipitation mm (inches) | 40 (1.6) | 33 (1.3) | 35 (1.4) | 38 (1.5) | 138 (5.4) | 190 (7.5) | 242 (9.5) | 216 (8.5) | 224 (8.8) | 200 (7.9) | 114 (4.5) | 94 (3.7) | 1,564 (61.6) |
| Average rainy days | 12.2 | 9.0 | 11.0 | 11.7 | 21.5 | 24.0 | 27.2 | 26.1 | 26.8 | 22.3 | 16.3 | 15.1 | 223.2 |
Source: Meteoblue

== Demographics ==
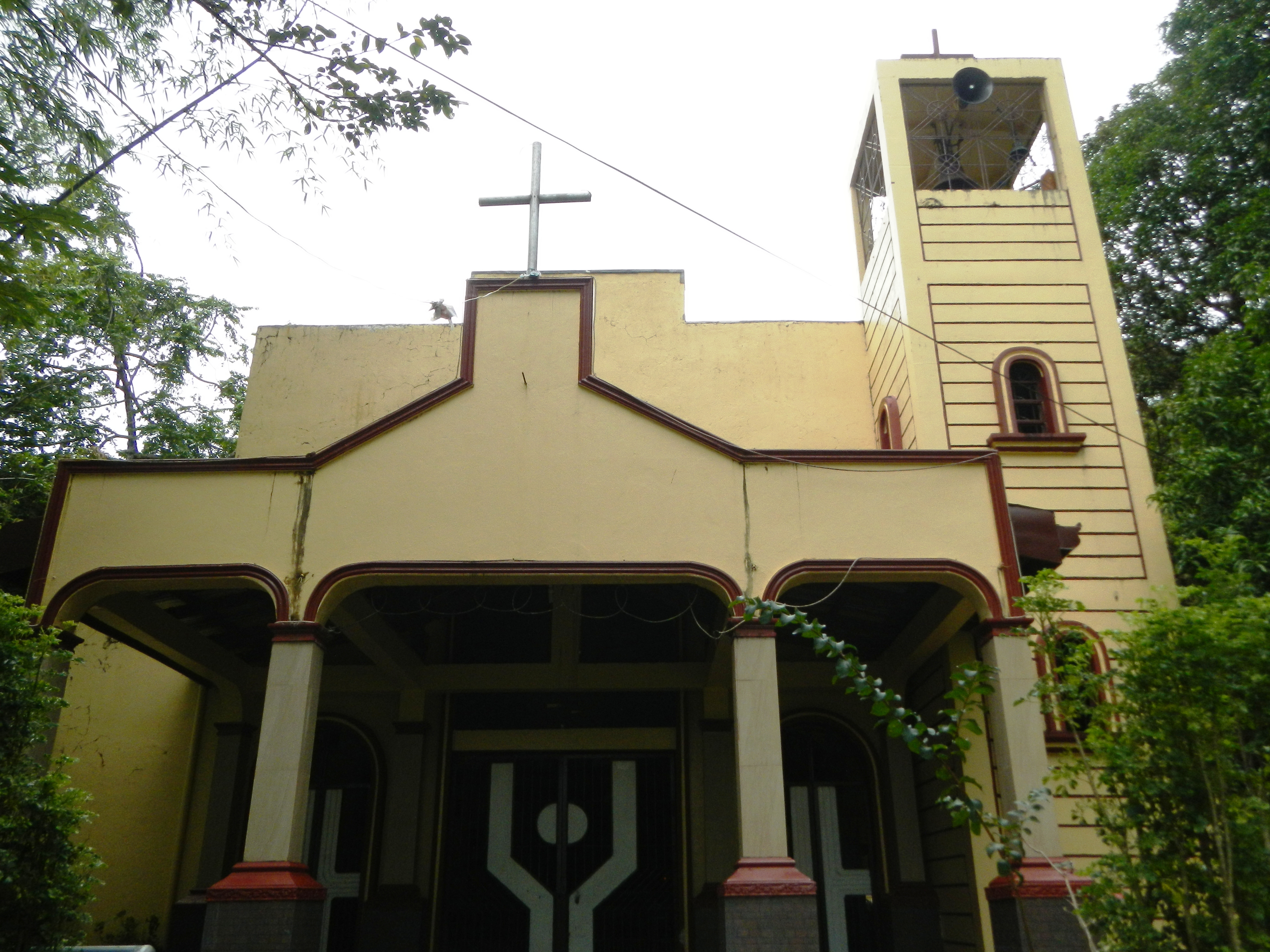
St. Raphael the Archangel Parish in Poblacion I

Population census of Real
| Year | Pop. | ±% p.a. |
|---|---|---|
| 1970 | 10,079 | — |
| 1975 | 13,231 | +5.61% |
| 1980 | 14,463 | +1.80% |
| 1990 | 20,475 | +3.54% |
| 1995 | 27,641 | +5.78% |
| 2000 | 30,684 | +2.26% |
| 2007 | 33,073 | +1.04% |
| 2010 | 35,189 | +2.28% |
| 2015 | 35,979 | +0.42% |
| 2020 | 38,678 | +1.53% |
| 2024 | 39,969 | +0.79% |
Source: Philippine Statistics Authority

== Economy ==
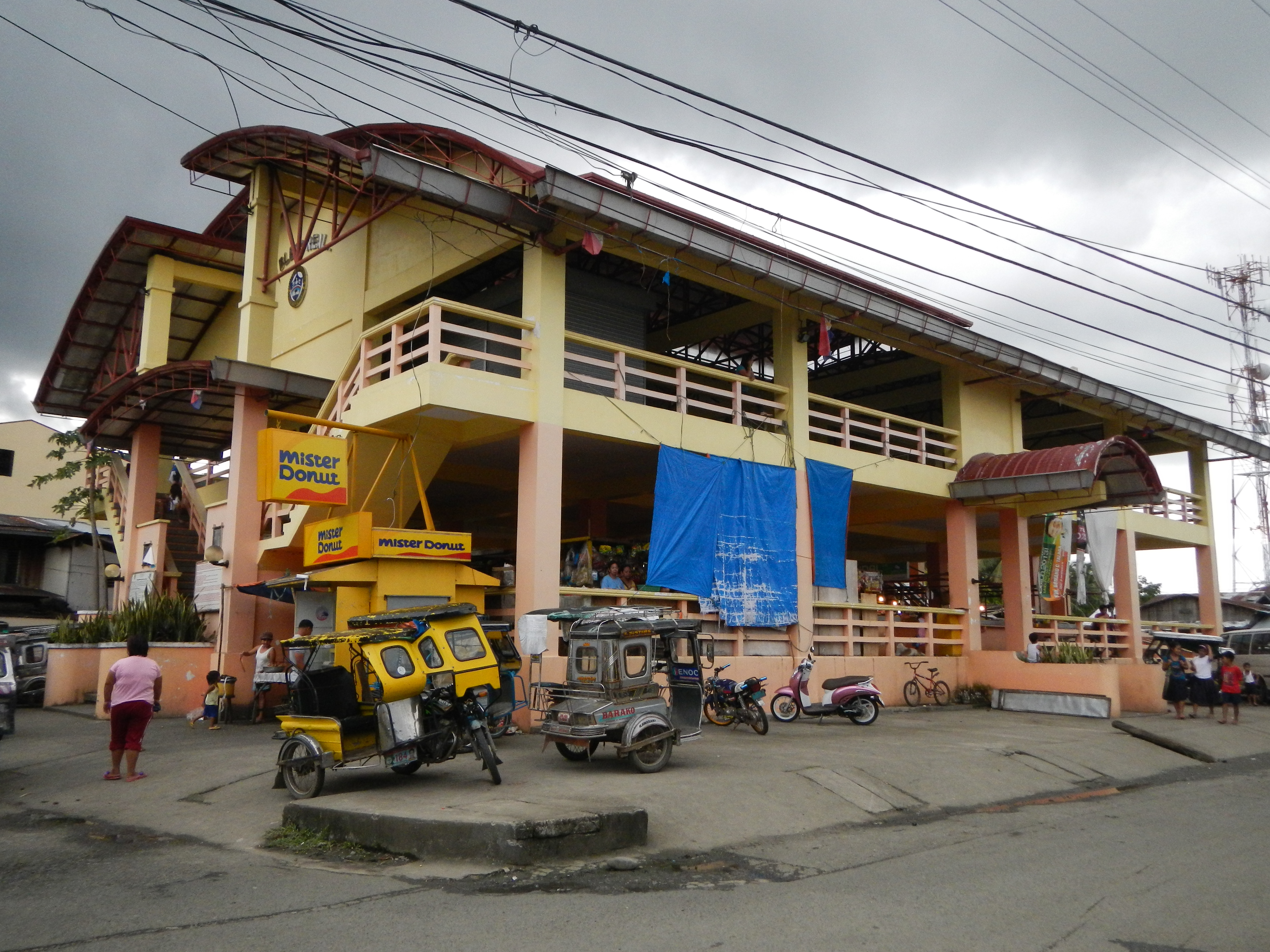
Real Public Market

Poverty incidence of Real (%)

Source: Philippine Statistics Authority

== Transportation ==
=== Bus route ===
Raymond Transportation and MRR Transportation Inc. (Manila-Infanta via Real v.v.), FOC Transportation (Lucena-Infanta via Real v.v.)

== Education ==
The Real Schools District Office governs all educational institutions within the municipality. It oversees the management and operations of all private and public, from primary to secondary schools.

=== Primary and elementary schools ===
- Bagong Silang Elementary School
- Capalong Elementary School
- Cawayan Elementary School
- Christian Heritage Academy
- Kiloloron Elementary School
- Little Baguio Elementary School
- Learnpoint Kiddie School
- Llavac Elementary School
- Lubayat Elementary School
- Malapad Elementary School
- Maliliit na Bato Elementary school
- Maragondon Elementary School
- Maunlad Elementary School
- Pandan Elementary School
- Real Central Elementary School
- Ricardo O. Macasaet Sr. Memorial Academy Foundation
- St. Raphael College of Business and Arts
- Tagumpay Elementary School
- Tanauan Elementary School
- Tignoan Elementary School
- Ungos Elementary School

=== Secondary schools ===
- Ungos Integrated National High School
- Ungos National High School Extension - Llavac
- Lubayat National High School
