= Makapili =

Philippine pro-Japan militant group in World War II

- Makabayang Katipunan ng mga Pilipino
- Leader: Benigno Ramos
- Founded: December 8, 1944
- Dissolved: August 15, 1945
- Country: Second Philippine Republic
- Ideology: Filipino nationalism Fascism
- Political position: Far-right
- Status: Defunct
- Size: 6,000

The Makabayang Katipunan ng mga Pilipino (lit. 'Patriotic Association of Filipinos'), better known as the Makapili, was a militant group formed in the Philippines on December 8, 1944, during World War II to give military aid to the Imperial Japanese Army. The group was meant to be on equal basis with the Japanese Army and its leaders were appointed with ranks that were equal to their Japanese counterparts.

== Background ==
As the Japanese-sponsored Second Philippine Republic was established on October 14, 1943, with the Declaration of Independence by Pres. Jose P. Laurel, Prime Minister Hideki Tojo expected the Philippine leadership to openly side with Japan with a declaration of war against the United States and Great Britain. Pres. Laurel resisted this, and in the alliance treaty he drafted he left out the provision of conscription of Filipinos to fight for Japan.

With Laurel's lack of cooperation to the Japanese goals, Gen. Shigenori Kuroda enlisted the help of Benigno Ramos to form a "Peace Army," whose main role was to support the Japanese military in suppressing the Filipino resistance against their occupation. With the support of the Japanese Military Administration, Ramos gathered other pro-Japanese leaders to his residence in Mandaluyong, and present were Gen. Artemio Ricarte, Sotero Baluyut, Pio Duran, Leon Villafuerte, Andres Villanueva, and Aurelio Alvero.

In line with the Japanese agenda was the question of the effectiveness of the Bureau of Constabulary to fight off banditry and insurgency. The BOC was mainly ineffective due to the confiscation of its weapons by the Japanese military out of fear that most of its members were formerly trained by the United States military. The only armed force allowed by the Japanese was the Presidential Guards. Ramos then proposed the Peace Army would be used to support the BOC to maintain peace and order. Baluyut who was Laurel's representative pointed that the President was not consulted on this, but Ramos insisted that the President's approval was not necessary since they were supported by the Japanese Military Administration. The Japanese Military Administration released 2,000 rifles to the MAKAPILI at their headquarters in Christ the King Compound, along E. Rodriguez Ave., in Quezon City.

Pres. Laurel protested against the formation of the MAKAPILI as it did not form with allegiance to the Republic, but that to Japan, with then Japanese Ambassador Shōzō Murata. But, in response, Laurel was informed by the Ambassador that he should attend the formal inauguration of the MAKAPILI, and his absence would be considered by Tokyo as non-cooperation. Pres. Laurel with a few other officials thus attended the formal establishment of the MAKAPILI on December 8, 1944. Initial members were mostly composed of Ramos' GANAP Party which was an offshoot of the Sakdalistas who helped the Japanese in recruiting manpower for their administration of the Philippines.

During the inauguration, Ramos declared that the Makapilis were independent of the Republic of the Philippines, and were only answerable to the Japanese Commander-in-Chief, Gen. Tomoyuki Yamashita. When Pres. Laurel spoke, he reminded the MAKAPILI never to betray the country and their loyalty is to the Philippines. The friction between Ramos and Laurel was evident, and from the original plan of having Laurel as Supreme Adviser and Ricarte as Supreme Head, Ramos declared himself as Supreme Commander of the Makapili.

== Operations ==
Like Ganap, the Makapili's main area of support was Metro Manila, although it established chapters across the islands, attracting some support. In all, it attracted to 6,000 members, many of them poor or landless farmers who came to the group due to vague promises of land reform after the war. They were armed with bayonets and bamboo spears but when the number of the Japanese puppet force grew, they were equipped with rifles.

Makapili were not used to fight the American forces and were merely deployed to counter the recognized guerrilla and the Philippine Commonwealth military activity by anti-Japanese forces in rural areas. The group was initially used as guards for Japanese and government facilities. The Japanese did not trust the Makapili on its own so most of these were not assigned as separate detachments but were assigned to Japanese units.

During the Battle of Manila, Ramos and his leaders found themselves in Pasay on the side of the Japanese. He ordered the burning of all the houses west of Taft Avenue and south of Libertad Avenue to delay the advance of the 11th Airborne Division into southern Manila.

After the war ended in 1945, the group was disbanded and vilified for its involvement in some of the Japanese atrocities in the islands. Individual members faced trials for treason as a result.

A 1951 film of the same name was made starring Justina David.

== Legacy ==
The Makapili was strongly and extensively vilified by the Filipino people after the war. For example, post-WWII Filipino films portraying Makapili members typically show them wearing bayong, a woven basket made from leaves, with eye holes and pointing out people whom they suspect of being resistance sympathizers. They are then shown leaving the area while Japanese soldiers are now guarding the resistance sympathizers they pointed out.

== See also ==
- Collaboration with the Empire of Japan
- Japanese occupation of the Philippines
- Chinilpa
- Hanjian
- Legion of the Just Ruler
