= KALIBAPI =

Fascist Filipino political party during the nation's Japanese occupation

Association for Service to the New Philippines Kapisanan sa Paglilingkod sa Bagong Pilipinas
- Abbreviation: KALIBAPI
- Leader: Directors-General: Benigno S. Aquino (1942–1943); Camilo Osías (1943–1945)
- Secretary-General: Pio Duran
- Founder: Philippine Executive Commission
- Founded: December 8, 1942
- Dissolved: 1945
- Headquarters: Manila, Second Philippine Republic
- Ideology: Filipino nationalism National conservatism Fascism; Japanophilia
- Political position: Far-right
- Anthem: "Da I Atiw Ng Kalibapi" ("March Of The Kalibapi")

Election symbol

Party flag

The Kapisanan sa Paglilingkod sa Bagong Pilipinas (lit. 'Association for Service to the New Philippines'), or KALIBAPI, was a fascist Filipino political party that served as the sole party of the state during the Japanese occupation. It was intended to be a Filipino version of Japan's governing Imperial Rule Assistance Association.

== History ==
Formed by the Philippine Executive Commission (Filipino: Komisyong Tagapagpaganap ng Pilipinas) under the leadership of Jorge Vargas, the party was created by Proclamation No. 109 of the PEC, a piece of legislation passed on December 8, 1942, banning all existing political parties and creating the new governing alliance. The Japanese had already dissolved all political parties on the islands, even including the pro-Japanese Ganap Party, and established KALIBAPI as a mass movement designed to support the occupation whilst taking advantage of Filipino nationalism in the region. Inaugurated on December 30, 1942, the death anniversary of Filipino writer and nationalist José Rizal, "to emphasize the patriotic basis of the organization", the party was headed by its Director-General Benigno S. Aquino with Pío Durán as Secretary-General and effective second in command and Ganap leader Benigno Ramos as a member of the executive committee. The three toured the Philippines, setting up local party organisations and promoting the "new order in East Asia" at mass meetings.

For the Japanese, KALIBAPI served as a labour recruitment service in its initial stages before taking on an expanded role in mid-1943. It was left to KALIBAPI to write the new constitution and establish the new National Assembly, resulting in Aquino's appointment as Speaker (as his replacement as Director-General by Camilo Osías). All 54 members of the Assembly were also KALIBAPI members, although 33 of them had held elected office before the invasion as well. KALIBAPI soon claimed a membership that ran into the hundreds of thousands. The islands were declared officially independent as the Second Philippine Republic on October 14, 1943, under President José P. Laurel and his KALIBAPI government. This had been accomplished through the Preparatory Committee for Philippine Independence, which KALIBAPI had established in mid-1943 under Japanese direction.

Taking a highly nationalistic standpoint, KALIBAPI was active in initiatives to promote the Tagalog language as a central feature of Filipino identity. To this end, a pared-down 1,000-word version of Tagalog was promoted to be learned rapidly by those not yet versed in the language. The general nationalism of Laurel's government strained relations with Japan, particularly as Laurel had refused to declare war on the United States and United Kingdom. As such, the Japanese instructed Ramos to form a new group, Makapili, in November 1944 to give more tangible military support to the Japanese.

KALIBAPI disappeared after the Japanese surrender in August 1945, with some of its leaders arrested for collaboration and treason. No former KALIBAPI candidates ran for office in the 1946 general election of the restored Commonwealth, and some of those not arrested went into hiding in Philippines, exile in Japan, or were executed by vengeful Filipinos or the Communist-aligned Hukbalahap.

== Sources ==
- Jose, Ricardo T. (2001), "The Association for Service to the New Philippines (KALIBAPI) during the Japanese Occupation: Attempting to Transplant a Japanese Wartime Concept to the Philippines" (PDF), The Journal of Sophia Asian Studies (19): 149–185, archived from the original (PDF) on October 20, 2014
- Pomeroy, William J. (1992), The Philippines: Colonialism, Collaboration, and Resistance, International Publishers Co., pp. 113–119
