= List of special elections in the Philippines =

This is a list of special elections in the Philippines. The Philippines holds two types of special elections: those that were supposed to be held on election day but were delayed, and those held after an office has become vacant. This article describes both types, with the ones arising from vacancies are also known outside the Philippines and the United States as "by-elections". This includes special elections to Congress and its predecessors—the Philippine Legislature, the National Assembly of the Philippines, the Commonwealth Congress, and the Batasang Pambansa—as well as to local legislatures and executive offices, if applicable.

Most special elections are for vacancies in Congress. The last special election of any sort was held in Cavite's 4th congressional district on August 29, 2026, to elect the successor of Kiko Barzaga who was expelled.

This also discusses elections due to delays, and had been more frequent before automation.

== Arising due to vacancies ==
=== Procedure ===
The following table is the evolution of law in regards to who, when and how special elections are called since 1907.

Implementing law	Applied from	Election called by	Alloted time		Prohibition on upcoming election	
Implementing law	Applied from	Election called by	Upper house	Lower house	Upper house	Lower house
Act No. 1582	1907–1911	Governor-General	40 to 90 days from proclamation		1 year before end of term	
Act No. 2045	1911–1936	Governor-General	40 to 90 days from proclamation		No prohibition	
Commonwealth Act No. 21	1936–1947	President	20 to 90 days from proclamation		10 months before end of term	
Republic Act No. 180	1947–1971	President upon notification by Congress	As soon as possible		10 months before end of term	
Republic Act No. 6388	1947–1985	President upon notification by Congress	As soon as possible		10 months before end of term	
Batas Pambansa Blg. 881	1985–1987	Commission on Elections	—	Up to 60 days from vacancy	—	18 months before next general election
Republic Act No. 6645	1987–1991	Commission on Elections upon notification by Congress	45 to 90 days from date of resolution (House)	Next scheduled election	1 year before next general election	18 months before next general election
Republic Act No. 7166	1991–2025	Commission on Elections upon notification by Congress	45 to 90 days from date of resolution (House)	Next scheduled election	1 year before next general election	18 months before next general election
Hagedorn vs. House of Representatives et al.	2025–present	Commission on Elections	60 to 90 days from vacancy (House)	Next scheduled election	1 year before next general election	18 months before next general election

==== American era ====
The Philippine Commission, by then the highest civil authority outside the Governor-General, in the Insular Government of the Philippine Islands, passed Act No. 1582 or the "Election Law" on January 9, 1907. It specifies that for any vacancies in the Philippine Assembly, it shall be determined by a special election set by the Governor-General that shall be not be less than 40 days, but not more than 90 days, from the date of proclamation.

For provincial officials, the Governor-General shall call for a special election. For municipal officials, if the office of municipal president is vacated, it shall be filled by the vice-president, if there is one. For other municipal officials, it shall be appointed by the provincial board.

The same law specified that once convened, the Philippine Assembly shall be the lower house of the bicameral Philippine Legislature, with the Philippine Commission being the upper house.

Act No. 2045, enacted by the Philippine Legislature on February 3, 1911, struck out the provision on the prohibition of filling up vacancies on the Philippine Assembly a year before its term ends.

The Tydings–McDuffie Act transformed the Insular Government to the Commonwealth of the Philippines. A constitution was then approved, replacing the Philippine Legislature with the unicameral National Assembly. In 1936, the National Assembly then passed Commonwealth Act (C.A.) No. 21 that governed special elections. It stated that vacancies that occur 10 months before the term expires shall have special elections. C.A. No. 357, or the Election Law passed in 1938, carried the same provisions as C.A. No 21., as far as vacancies to the National Assembly are concerned. As for a simultaneous permanent vacancy in the offices of president and vice president, the law puts the power to the National Assembly to call a special election, with an option to call an election only for the president.

In the 1935 constitution, it was silent on the procedure governing vacancies in the vice presidency once the vice president becomes president. During the 1935 constitution's usage, the vice presidency was left vacant in cases such as this.

==== Third Republic era ====
The United States granted independence to the Philippines on July 4, 1946.

In Republic Act (RA) No. 180, or the Revised Election Code of 1947, if a vacancy in either chamber of Congress occurs at least 10 months or before a regular election, the president shall call a special election as soon as the chamber where the vacancy occurred of the existence of such vacancy notified him. RA No. 6388, or the Election Code of 1971, superseded RA 180 in 1971. but otherwise had identical provisions on special elections.

During the Third Republic era (1946–1972), special elections were held concurrently with the Senate midterm and local elections.

==== Fourth Republic era ====
The 1973 constitution originally abolished the vice presidency. It was revived under a 1984 amendment, but an election was not immediately scheduled.

In Batas Pambansa Blg. 881, or the Omnibus Election Code of the Philippines, approved on December 3, 1985, in case of a vacancy in the Batasang Pambansa (National Parliament) 18 months or more before a regular election, the Commission on Elections shall call a special election to be held within sixty days after the vacancy occurs; in case parliament is dissolved, the President shall call an election which shall not be held earlier than forty-five nor later than sixty days from the date of such dissolution. Several weeks earlier, President Ferdinand Marcos ordered the Batasang Pambansa to call a special snap election a year prior to the regularly-schedule election. B.P. Blg. 883 called the special presidential election on the same day B.P. Blg. 881 was passed. Marcos was then ousted after the People Power Revolution when it was alleged he won that election via massive election fraud. The new government headed by President Corazon Aquino restored the presidential system with a bicameral Congress.

==== Fifth Republic era ====
The constitution ratified in 1987 provided Congress to convene on the third day of the vacancy of both the presidency and vice presidency to enact a law calling for a special election for both offices, with the exception that no election will be called if the next scheduled election is 18 months away. If only one of the offices is vacant, the vice president becomes president, or the president appoints a member of Congress as vice president, with both chambers voting separately to confirm the appointment, as the case may be.

Later, as stipulated in R.A. No. 6645 approved on December 28, 1987, once a vacancy occurs in the Senate at least 18 months, or in the House of Representatives at least one year, before the next scheduled election, the Commission on Elections, upon receipt of a resolution from the chamber where the vacancy occurred, shall schedule a special election. The special election will then be held not earlier than 45 days nor later than 90 days from the date of the resolution.

However, R.A. No. 7166 approved on November 26, 1991, amended parts of R.A. No. 6645. When a vacancy in the House of Representatives occurs at least one year before the expiration of the term, the special election shall be held not earlier than 60 days nor later than 90 days after occurrence of the vacancy. For the Senate, if the vacancy occurs also at least one year before the expiration of the term, the special election shall be held on the day of the next succeeding regular election.

With the passage of Republic Act No. 8295 in 1997, if there is only one candidate running for the position, that candidate would be proclaimed as the winner, and an election would no longer be held. This is unlike in regularly scheduled elections where voting would still be held and the candidate has to get one vote in order to be elected. Since the enactment of this law, no special election has seen only one candidate.

In 2025, the Supreme Court ruled in Hagedorn vs. House of Representatives, et al. that the commission does not have to wait for a resolution from the House of Representatives, saying that R.A. No. 7166 repealed the provision of R.A. No. 6645 where the commission had to receive a resolution from the relevant chamber to schedule a special election. This stems from the fact that the COMELEC did not hold a special election at Palawan's 3rd district after its incumbent Edward Hagedorn died mid-term. Hagedorn's son Elroy John filed a petition to the Supreme Court due to the House of Representatives' nonaction.

As with general elections, special elections are usually scheduled on a Monday. Special elections held since the 15th Congress are mostly done on Saturdays. In some cases, election days are declared as holidays.

==== Lack of special elections ====
In accordance with current laws, the decision to call a special election to fill permanent vacancies is not mandatory, and is solely at the discretion of Congress, which has received criticism for not quickly acting to fill such vacancies. Despite many vacancies occurring well before a year from the end of a congressional term, Congress has left many such seats unfilled. In more extreme examples some even remained vacant for two years or more:

Not all vacancies that occurred a year before the next regular election resulted in a special election. To save money, the Speaker appoints a caretaker representative from a nearby district. In same cases a caretaker representative was appointed while an election date was considered.

Since the country's independence in 1946, no special elections were called during the presidencies of Carlos P. Garcia, Corazon Aquino and Joseph Estrada; the 4th Congress, during the Garcia presidency, notably did not have deaths in the lower house. During the first half of the presidency of Diosdado Macapagal, and the latter half of the presidencies of Fidel V. Ramos and Gloria Macapagal Arroyo, and from the beginning of the second presidential term of Ferdinand Marcos in 1969 until his removal from office in 1986, no special elections were called. During the presidency of Rodrigo Duterte, no special elections were ever held. In the first half of the presidency of Bongbong Marcos, at least one special election was called.

=== President and vice president ===
The current constitution mandates Congress shall call for a special election if both the offices of president and vice president are vacant at the same time, and that the next regularly scheduled election is not more than 18 months away.

This provision of the constitution has never been tested.

=== Senate ===
==== Philippine Legislature (1916–1935) ====
From 1917 to 1934, senators are elected via senatorial districts; a vacancy mid-term had been filled up by a special election.

Leg.	District	Date	Predecessor	Political party	Cause	Winner	Political party	Retained?
4th	2nd	May 5, 1917	Aquilino Calvo	Nacionalista	Appointed Mountain Province governor	Matias Gonzales	Nacionalista	Yes
5th	3rd	October 25, 1919	Francisco Liongson	Nacionalista	Died in office	Ceferino de Leon	Nacionalista	Yes
6th	4th	October 3, 1923	Pedro Guevara	Nacionalista	Elected resident commissioner	Ramon J. Fernandez	Nacionalista	Yes
7th	3rd	March 23, 1926	Santiago Lucero	Democrata	Died in office	Luis Morales	Democrata	Yes
7th	9th	1926	Tomas Gomez	Nacionalista	Died in office	Pastor Salazar	Nacionalista	Yes
7th	7th	July 21, 1927	Jose Ma. Arroyo	Nacionalista	Died in office	Jose Ledesma	Nacionalista	Yes
9th	6th	1931	Juan B. Alegre	Democrata	Died in office	José O. Vera	Nacionalista	No

==== Commonwealth Congress (1945–1946) ====
- No special elections were called for the Commonwealth Congress.

Starting from 1941, senators elected at-large nationwide, have 6-year terms, with senators elected via staggered elections: every two years, eight out of the 24 senators were elected from 1940 to 1972, and 12 out of 24 senators every three years since 1987. In cases where a senator left office before the expiration of his term, a special election on the day of the next regularly scheduled Senate election was held to fill up the vacancy, as long as the seat per se won't be contested on that election day. There had been three cases where that happened.

==== Congress of the Philippines (1946–1973; 1987–present) ====
Leg.	Date	Predecessor	Political party	Cause	Winner	Political party	Retained?
2nd	November 13, 1951	Fernando Lopez	Liberal	Elected vice president	Felixberto Verano	Nacionalista	No
3rd	November 8, 1955	Carlos P. Garcia	Nacionalista	Elected vice president	Roseller T. Lim	Nacionalista	Yes
12th	May 14, 2001	Teofisto Guingona Jr.	Lakas	Appointed vice president	Gregorio Honasan	Independent	No

==== Statistics ====
Death and leaving office for another position are the most frequent reasons why there are senatorial special elections:

Reason for vacancy	Total	%
Death/Killing	5	50%
Left office to assume another position	4	40%
Resignation	1	10%
Total	10	100%

==== Per election ====
===== 1951 =====
In 1949, Senator Fernando Lopez (who was on his second year of service in the Senate) was elected Vice President of the Philippines. To fill the vacancy, a special election was held separately with senators whose terms ended in that year:

Candidate	Party	Votes	%
Felixberto Verano	Nacionalista Party	873,457	47.69
Cornelio Villareal	Liberal Party	609,303	33.27
Prospero Sanidad	Liberal Party (Independent)	223,810	12.22
Carlos Tan	Liberal Party (Independent)	124,975	6.82
Total		1,831,545	100.00
Valid votes		1,831,545	41.71
Invalid/blank votes		2,559,564	58.29
Total votes		4,391,109	–
Registered voters/turnout		4,754,307	92.36

===== 1955 =====
In 1953, Senator Carlos P. Garcia (who was on his second year of service in the Senate) was elected Vice President of the Philippines. To fill the vacancy, a special election was held separately with senators whose terms ended in that year:

Candidate	Party	Votes	%
Roseller T. Lim	Nacionalista Party	1,102,979	61.40
Simeon Toribio	Liberal Party	688,913	38.35
Avelino P. Garcia	Independent	4,378	0.24
Total		1,796,270	100.00
Valid votes		1,796,270	35.59
Invalid/blank votes		3,250,218	64.41
Total votes		5,046,488	–
Registered voters/turnout		6,487,061	77.79

===== 2001 =====
In 2001, Vice President Gloria Macapagal Arroyo succeeded Joseph Estrada after the 2001 EDSA Revolution, leaving the office of the vice president vacant. Arroyo appointed Teofisto Guingona (who was serving the second year of his second term as senator) as vice president later that year but prior to the 2001 Senate election. The Commission on Elections ruled that instead of twelve, the electorate will vote for thirteen senators, with the thirteenth-placed candidate serving Guingona's unexpired term of three years. For purposes of term limits, that senator was deemed to have served a full six-year term.

Candidate	Party or alliance		Votes	%
Noli de Castro	Independent (Note: Guest candidate of Puwersa ng Masa)		16,237,386	55.09
Juan Flavier	People Power Coalition	Lakas–NUCD–UMDP	11,735,897	39.82
Serge Osmeña	People Power Coalition	PDP–Laban	11,593,389	39.33
Franklin Drilon	People Power Coalition	Independent	11,301,700	38.34
Joker Arroyo	People Power Coalition	Lakas–NUCD–UMDP	11,262,402	38.21
Ramon Magsaysay Jr.	People Power Coalition	Independent	11,250,677	38.17
Manny Villar	People Power Coalition	Independent	11,187,375	37.96
Kiko Pangilinan	People Power Coalition	Liberal Party	10,971,896	37.23
Edgardo Angara	Puwersa ng Masa	Laban ng Demokratikong Pilipino	10,805,177	36.66
Panfilo Lacson	Puwersa ng Masa	Laban ng Demokratikong Pilipino	10,535,559	35.74
Loi Ejercito	Puwersa ng Masa	Independent	10,524,130	35.71
Ralph Recto (Note: 18,000 votes deducted in Zamboanga del Norte as per Resolution No. NBC 01-003)	People Power Coalition	Lakas–NUCD–UMDP	10,480,940	35.56
Gregorio Honasan (Note: Elected to serve the unexpired term (until 2004) of Teofisto Guingona Jr., who was appointed Vice President in February 2001.)	Puwersa ng Masa	Independent	10,454,527	35.47
Juan Ponce Enrile	Puwersa ng Masa	Laban ng Demokratikong Pilipino	9,677,209	32.83
Miriam Defensor Santiago	Puwersa ng Masa	People's Reform Party	9,622,742	32.65
Dong Puno	Puwersa ng Masa	Laban ng Demokratikong Pilipino	8,701,205	29.52
Wigberto Tañada	People Power Coalition	Liberal Party	8,159,836	27.68
Orly Mercado	Puwersa ng Masa	Independent	7,395,092	25.09
Roberto Pagdanganan	People Power Coalition	Lakas–NUCD–UMDP	7,185,415	24.38
Ernesto Herrera	People Power Coalition	Lakas–NUCD–UMDP	6,801,861	23.08
Winnie Monsod	People Power Coalition	Aksyon Demokratiko	6,728,728	22.83
Santanina Rasul	Puwersa ng Masa	Independent	5,222,490	17.72
Jamby Madrigal	Puwersa ng Masa	Laban ng Demokratikong Pilipino	5,043,043	17.11
Liwayway Vinzons-Chato	People Power Coalition	Independent	4,831,501	16.39
Perfecto Yasay	Independent		4,557,364	15.46
Ombra Tamano	Puwersa ng Masa	Laban ng Demokratikong Pilipino	3,548,480	12.04
Reuben Canoy	Puwersa ng Masa	Laban ng Demokratikong Pilipino	3,542,460	12.02
Homobono Adaza	Nacionalista Party		770,647	2.61
Rod Navarro	Independent		652,012	2.21
Manuel Morato	Independent		625,789	2.12
Moner Bajunaid	Partido Demokratiko Sosyalista ng Pilipinas		503,437	1.71
Oliver Lozano	Kilusang Bagong Lipunan		470,572	1.60
Melchor Chavez	Kilusang Bagong Lipunan		244,553	0.83
Camilo Sabio	Independent		230,759	0.78
Norma Nueva	Kilusang Bagong Lipunan		83,700	0.28
Juan Casil	Kilusang Bagong Lipunan		74,481	0.25
Eddie Gil	Partido Isang Bansa, Isang Diwa		15,522	0.05
Total			243,029,953	100.00
Total votes			29,474,309	–
Registered voters/turnout			36,271,782	81.26
Source: COMELEC vote totals, NCSB (turnout)

Former senator Arturo Tolentino and others sued the Commission on Elections (Comelec) to set aside the proclamation of the thirteen senators in 2001. In Tolentino vs. Comelec, the Supreme Court ruled that the commission did not comply with the requirements of R.A. 6645, nor did the commission "give formal notice that it would proclaim as winner the senatorial candidate receiving the 13th highest number of votes in the special election." However, the court ruled that while the commission failed to give notice of the time of the special election, it did not negate the calling of such election, "indispensable to the elections validity." Since R.A. 6645 as amended "charges the voters with knowledge of this statutory notice and Comelec's failure to give the additional notice did not negate the calling of such special election, much less invalidate it", the court dismissed the petition for lack of merit and allowed the result of the election to stand.

==== The "thirteenth" senator ====
There had been four instances in the Fifth Republic where a seat was vacated exactly midway through the senators' term due to election to another office. In all cases, the thirteenth-placed senator in the immediately preceding election was not given the former's seat, since the vacancy occurred after the election.

- In 1998, Senator Gloria Macapagal Arroyo was elected vice president midway through her term. Arroyo's seat was up for the 2001 election and no special elections were held, nor was the thirteenth-placed candidate during the 1998 Senate election (Roberto Pagdanganan) proclaimed winner. Later that year, Marcelo Fernan died in office, leaving two vacant seats in the Senate. Fernan's seat was also up in 2001.
- In 2004, Senator Noli de Castro was elected vice president midway through his term. De Castro's seat was up for the 2007 election and no special election was held, nor was the thirteenth-placed candidate during the 2004 Senate election (Robert Barbers) proclaimed winner.
- In 2007, Senator Alfredo Lim was elected mayor of Manila midway through his term. Lim's seat was up for the 2010 election and no special election was held, nor was the thirteenth-placed candidate during the 2007 Senate election (Koko Pimentel) proclaimed winner. On August 15, 2011, Pimentel assumed the seat of Migz Zubiri after allegations of electoral fraud.
- In 2010, Senator Benigno Aquino III was elected president midway through his term. Aquino's seat was up for the 2013 election and no special election was held, nor was the thirteenth-placed candidate during the 2010 Senate election (Risa Hontiveros) proclaimed winner.

In all of those cases, the thirteenth-placed candidate was not given the vacant seat as the voters elected for only twelve senators.

This was not a problem for senators elected from 1946 to 1971, as long as they were elected to a new position prior to the second Senate election of their terms; a senator is expected to see two Senate elections in a six-year term instead of just one post-1987:

- In 1949, two years in to his term, Senator Fernando Lopez was elected vice president. A special election was called in 1951 for a successor to serve out the final two years of the term. Felixberto Verano was elected in the special election. Verano was subsequently defeated in the next regular election in 1953.
- In 1953, two years in to his term, Senator Carlos P. Garcia was elected vice president. A special election was called in 1955 for a successor to serve out the final two years of the term. Roseller T. Lim was elected in the special election. Lim was able to defend his seat in the next regular election in 1957.

For senators elected since 1987, their seats will be vacant until the end of their terms since there will be no intervening Senate elections from the day they gave up their seat up to the expiration of their term, unless it becomes vacant prior to election day, as shown in the four examples above.

=== House of Representatives ===
Since the 1998 elections, there have been two types of elected representatives elected separately, those who represent single-member districts and those elected via the party-list system. When a vacancy occurs for a party-list representative, the next-ranked nominee from the party replaces his predecessor. For district representatives, a special election will be held to determine who shall succeed the predecessor. During the Third Philippine Republic, where representatives had four-year terms, the special election was held together with the mid-term election.

A special election will not be held if the vacancy occurred less than a year before the term expires.

In case of deaths of appointed sectoral representatives from 1987 to 1998, the president may appoint a replacement, with the advice and consent of the Commission on Appointments.

==== Malolos Congress (1898–1899) ====
The Malolos Constitution did not provide provisions for holding special elections to fill vacancies in the Malolos Congress.

==== Philippine Legislature (1907–1935) ====
Leg.	District	Date	Predecessor	Political party	Cause	Winner	Political party
1st	Manila–1st	March 30 and August 11, 1908	Dominador Gómez	Nacionalista	Expelled	Dominador Gómez	Nacionalista
1st	Manila–1st	March 30 and August 11, 1908	Dominador Gómez	Nacionalista	Resigned rights to sit	Justo Lukban	Liga Popular
1st	Cavite	January 19, 1909	Rafael Palma	Nacionalista	Appointed to the Philippine Commission	Emiliano Tría Tirona	Independent
2nd	Surigao	October 14, 1910	Manuel Gavieres	Nacionalista	Died in office	Inocencio Cortes	Nacionalista
2nd	La Laguna–1st	December 13, 1910	Potenciano Malvar	Nacionalista	Appointed La Laguna governor	Marcos Paulino	Progresista
2nd	Batanes	September 5, 1911	Teofilo Castillejos	Nacionalista	Died in office	Vicente Barsana	Progresista
2nd	Zambales	October 3, 1911	Alberto Barretto	Nacionalista	Appointed judge of the Rizal Court of First Instance	Gabriel Alba	Nacionalista
3rd	Ilocos Sur–1st	October 13, 1913	Vicente Singson Encarnacion	Progresista	Appointed to the Philippine Commission	Alberto Reyes	Progresista
3rd	Mindoro	March 26, 1914	Macario Adriatico	Nacionalista	Appointed member of the Code Committee	Mariano Leuterio	Liga Popular
3rd	Bulacan–1st	May 16, 1914	Aguedo Velarde	Nacionalista	Died in office	Ambrosio Santos	Nacionalista
3rd	Cagayan–1st	May 16, 1914	Cresencio Marasigan	Nacionalista	Election annulled	Venancio Concepción	Nacionalista
3rd	Zambales	July 22, 1914	Rafael Corpus	Nacionalista	Appointed Solicitor General	Gabriel Alba	Nacionalista
3rd	Iloilo–4th	August 28, 1914	Amando Avanceña	Nacionalista	Elected Iloilo governor	Tiburcio Lutero	Progresista
3rd	Negros Oriental–2nd	October 1, 1914	Teofisto Guingona Sr.	Progresista	Appointed Agusan governor	Leopoldo Rovira	Progresista
3rd	Capiz–2nd	October 10, 1914	Emilio Acevedo	Nacionalista	Died in office	Simeon Dadivas	Progresista
3rd	Cebu–7th	November 21, 1914	Eulalio Causing	Nacionalista	Resigned	Tomás N. Alonso	Nacionalista
3rd	Leyte–4th	September 18, 1915	Francisco Enage	Nacionalista	Appointed Iloilo provincial prosecutor	Ruperto Kapunan	Progresista
3rd	Rizal–2nd	September 18, 1915	Sixto de los Angeles	Nacionalista	Appointed Public Welfare Board member	Leandro Jabson	Nacionalista
4th	Cebu–3rd	1916	Filemon Sotto	Nacionalista	Elected senator from the 10th district	Vicente Urgello	Nacionalista
5th	None						
6th	None						
7th	Cavite	August 15, 1925	Augusto Reyes	Nacionalista	Died in office	Antero Soriano	Nacionalista
7th	Nueva Ecija	March 22, 1926	Isauro Gabaldon	Nacionalista	Disqualified	Feliciano Ramoso	Nacionalista
8th	Tayabas–2nd	October 6, 1928	León Guinto	Nacionalista	Appointed Tayabas governor	Marcelo Boncan	Nacionalista
8th	Cavite	1929	Antero Soriano	Nacionalista	Died in office	Fidel Ibañez	Nacionalista
9th	Albay–1st	September 29, 1931	Froilán Pavericio	Democrata	Died in office	Exequiel Kare (Note: Julian Locsin originally declared the winner, but Kare won election protest.)	Nacionalista
9th	Mindoro	June 4, 1932	Mariano Leuterio	Nacionalista	Died in office	Juan L. Luna	Nacionalista
9th	Batangas–1st	February 18, 1933	Antonio de las Alas	Nacionalista	Appointed Secretary of Public Works and Communications	Ramón Diokno	Nacionalista
9th	Zambales	April 1, 1933	Gregorio Anonas	Nacionalista	Appointed Undersecretary of Public Works and Communications	Mariano Alisangco	Independent

==== National Assembly (Commonwealth) (1935–1941) ====
Leg.	District	Date	Predecessor	Political party	Cause	Winner	Political party
1st	Ilocos Norte–2nd	September 1, 1936	Julio Nalundasan	Nacionalista Democratico	Died prior to taking office	Ulpiano Arzadon	Nacionalista Democratico
1st	Samar–2nd	September 1, 1936	Serafin Marabut	Nacionalista Democratico	Appointed Secretary of Budget	Pascual Azanza	Nacionalista Democratico
1st	Leyte–4th	September 1, 1936	Francisco Enage	Nacionalista Democratico	Appointed technical adviser to President Manuel L. Quezon	Norberto Romualdez	Nacionalista
1st	Abra	September 1, 1936	Quintín Paredes	Nacionalista Democratico	Appointed Resident Commissioner to the United States	Agapito Garduque	Nacionalista
1st	Camarines Norte	August 3, 1937	Cayetano Lukban	Nacionalista Democratico	Election annulled due to lack of residency	Froilan Pimentel	Nacionalista Democratico
2nd	Albay–3rd	December 10, 1940	Pedro Sabido	Nacionalista	Appointed manager of the National Abaca and other Fibers Corporation	Marcial O. Rañola	Nacionalista
2nd	Iloilo–2nd	December 10, 1940	Ruperto Montinola	Nacionalista	Died in office	Oscar Ledesma	Nacionalista
2nd	Leyte–5th	December 10, 1940	Ruperto Kapunan	Nacionalista	Died in office	Atilano R. Cinco	Nacionalista
2nd	Nueva Ecija–2nd	December 10, 1940	Felipe Buencamino Jr.	Nacionalista	Resigned	Gabriel Belmonte	Nacionalista

==== National Assembly (Second Republic) (1943–1944) ====
The 1943 constitution did not provide provisions for holding special elections to fill vacancies in the National Assembly.

==== Commonwealth Congress (1945–1946) ====
No special elections were called for the Commonwealth Congress, elected in 1941 and first met in 1945; the much-delayed elections of 1945 were held in 1946.

==== Congress of the Philippines (1946–1973; 1987–present) ====
Leg.	District	Date	Predecessor	Political party	Cause	Winner	Political party
1st	Pangasinan–5th	March 11, 1947	Narciso Ramos	Liberal	Appointed Minister-counsellor to the United Nations	Cipriano Alas	Liberal
1st	Bukidnon	March 11, 1947	Carlos Fortich Sr.	Liberal	Died in office	Remedios Fortich	Liberal
1st	Iloilo–1st	March 11, 1947	Jose Zulueta	Liberal	Appointed Secretary of the Interior	Mateo Nonato	Liberal
1st	Cebu–6th	November 11, 1947	Nicolas Rafols	Nacionalista	Died in office	Manuel Zosa	Nacionalista
1st	Iloilo–4th	March 23, 1948	Mariano Peñaflorida	Nacionalista	Elected Iloilo governor	Gaudencio Dimaisip	Nacionalista
1st	Leyte–1st	March 23, 1948	Carlos Tan	Liberal	Elected senator	Jose Martinez	Liberal
2nd	Rizal–2nd	November 13, 1951	Emilio de la Paz	Nacionalista	Died in office	Isaias R. Salonga	Nacionalista
2nd	Occidental Mindoro	November 13, 1951	Raul Leuterio (Note: Leuterio was the representative from the undivided Mindoro province.)	Liberal	Division of Mindoro province	Jesus V. Abeleda	Nacionalista
2nd	Zambales	November 13, 1951	Ramon Magsaysay	Liberal	Appointed as Secretary of National Defense	Cesar Miraflor	Liberal
3rd	Albay–1st	November 8, 1955	Lorenzo P. Ziga	Liberal	Died in office in a traffic accident	Tecla San Andres Ziga	Liberal
3rd	Samar–1st	November 8, 1955	Gregorio Tan	Nacionalista	Died in office in a traffic accident	Eladio Balite	Nacionalista
4th	None						
5th	Negros Occidental–1st	November 12, 1963	Vicente Gustillo Sr.	Nacionalista	Died in office	Armando Gustillo	Nacionalista
5th	Batangas–1st	November 12, 1963	Apolinario Apacible	Nacionalista	Died in office	Luis Lopez	Liberal
5th	Iloilo–3rd	November 9, 1965	Ramon Tabiana	Liberal	Died in office	Gloria Tabiana	Liberal
6th	Davao del Sur	November 14, 1967	Lorenzo Sarmiento (Note: Sarmiento was the representative from the undivided Davao province.)	Liberal	Division of Davao province	Artemio Loyola	Nacionalista
6th	Davao Oriental	November 14, 1967	Lorenzo Sarmiento	Liberal	Division of Davao province	Constancio P. Maglana	Nacionalista
6th	South Cotabato	November 14, 1967	Salipada Pendatun (Note: Pendatun was the representative from the undivided Cotabato province.)	Liberal	Division of Cotabato province	James Chiongbian	Nacionalista
6th	Ilocos Norte–1st	November 14, 1967	Antonio Raquiza	Liberal	Appointed Secretary of Public Works	Roque Ablan Jr.	Nacionalista
6th	Northern Samar	November 14, 1967	Eladio Balite	Nacionalista	Died in office	Eusebio Moore	Nacionalista
7th	None						
8th	None						
9th	Agusan del Norte–2nd	August 30, 1993	Edelmiro Amante	Lakas	Appointed Executive Secretary	Edelmiro Amante	Lakas
9th	Capiz–1st	August 30, 1993	Gerardo Roxas Jr.	Liberal	Died in office	Mar Roxas	Liberal
9th	Rizal–1st	March 7, 1994	Manuel Sanchez	Lakas	Disqualified	Gilberto Duavit Sr.	NPC
10th	None						
11th	None						
12th	Zamboanga del Norte–1st	August 26, 2002	Romeo Jalosjos Sr.	PDSP	Dropped from the rolls after criminal conviction	Cecilia Jalosjos Carreon	Reporma
12th	Isabela–4th	May 12, 2003	Antonio Abaya	Lakas	Died in office	Giorgidi Aggabao	NPC
13th	Cebu–5th	May 30, 2005	Ace Durano	Lakas	Appointed Secretary of Tourism	Ramon Durano VI	NPC
14th	None						
15th	Cagayan–2nd	March 12, 2011	Florencio Vargas	Lakas–Kampi	Died prior to taking office	Baby Aline Vargas-Alfonso	Lakas–Kampi
15th	Ilocos Sur–1st	May 28, 2011	Ronald Singson	Nacionalista	Resigned after criminal conviction	Ryan Luis Singson	Biled
15th	Zambales–2nd	February 4, 2012	Antonio Diaz	LM	Died in office	Jun Omar Ebdane	LM
15th	Negros Occidental–5th	June 2, 2012	Iggy Arroyo	Lakas–Kampi	Died in office	Alejandro Mirasol	Liberal
16th	None						
17th	None						
18th	None						
19th	Cavite–7th	February 25, 2023	Jesus Crispin Remulla	NUP	Appointed Secretary of Justice	Crispin Diego Remulla	NUP
19th	Negros Oriental–3rd	~~December 9, 2023~~	Arnolfo Teves Jr.	NPC	Expelled	Cancelled	
20th	Antipolo–2nd	March 14, 2026	Romeo Acop	NUP	Died in office	Bong Acop	NUP
20th	Cavite–4th	August 29, 2026	Kiko Barzaga	PDP–Laban	Expelled	Jenny Barzaga	NUP
20th	Batanes–at large	November 28, 2026	Jun Gato	NPC	Died in office		

On April 22, 2025, the Supreme Court ruled that the Commission on Elections holds the sole and mandatory duty to call and conduct a special election for a vacant seat in the House of Representatives if the vacancy occurs at least one year before the term expires. This decision clarifies that the Commission on Elections does not require a formal resolution or certification from the House of Representatives to fulfill its obligation. The Court dismissed a petition for mandamus intended to compel the House of Representatives to issue such a certification. Consequently the responsibility to hold special elections within the statutory period rests entirely with the Commission on Elections once the legal conditions for a vacancy are met. The decision paved the way for the special election in Antipolo–2nd, Cavite–4th and future special elections without certification from the House of Representatives.

==== Batasang Pambansa (1978–1986) ====
While the 1973 constitution had the mechanism for calling special elections in case of vacancies in the Batasang Pambansa, and several vacancies indeed happened, no special elections were called.

==== Statistics ====
===== By reason =====
The most common reason for the vacancies which were filled by special elections since 1907 is resignation (a total of 28 instances)—both from leaving office to assume another position (22), and for other reasons (7). Death of the incumbent representative is the second most common, accounting for more than two-fifths of instances. Other reasons for holding special elections were to fill new seats created upon the establishment of new provinces (4 instances), and to fill the seats vacated after: a winning candidate was disqualified post-election (2), a representative was expelled from the legislature (1), or a representative was "dropped from the rolls" over a criminal conviction (1).

Reason for vacancy	Total	%
Death/Killing	27	42%
Left office to assume another position	22	34%
Resignation for a reason other than leaving office to assume another position	7	11%
Creation of a new province	4	6%
Disqualification	2	3%
Expulsion	2	2%
Dropped from the rolls	1	2%
Total	65	100%

===== By legislative era =====
Most of the special elections—33, or more than half of the 61 conducted as of 2017—were held before the Second World War (1907–1941). In the space of 27 years after the war and before Ferdinand Marcos disbanded Congress and assumed dictatorial powers in 1972, a total of 18 special elections were held. In contrast, since the restoration of Congress in 1987 only 12 special elections have been held in the space of 30 years.

Legislative era	Total	%
Philippine Assembly (lower house of Philippine Legislature, 1907–1916)	18	28%
House of Representatives (lower house of Philippine Legislature, 1916–1935)	8	13%
National Assembly of the Commonwealth (unicameral body, 1935–1941)	7	11%
National Assembly of the Second Republic (unicameral body, 1943–1944)	0	0%
House of Representatives (lower house of Congress post-war period, 1945–1972)	18	28%
Batasang Pambansa (unicameral body, 1978–1986)	0	0%
House of Representatives (lower house of Congress post-restoration, 1987–present)	13	20%
Total	64	100%

=== Other positions ===
==== Prior to 1991 ====
Prior to the Local Government Code of 1991, special elections were possible:

Date	Position	Location
November 10, 1953	Mayor	Victoria, Tarlac
November 12, 1957	Lieutenant governor	Camiguin
November 12, 1957	City councilor	Bacolod
November 14, 1961	Governor	Surigao del Norte
November 14, 1961	Vice governor	Surigao del Norte
November 14, 1961	All members of the provincial board	Surigao del Norte
November 14, 1961	Governor	Surigao del Sur
November 14, 1961	Vice governor	Surigao del Sur
November 14, 1961	1 member of the provincial board	Surigao del Sur
November 9, 1965	1 member of the municipal council	Atok, Mountain Province
November 9, 1965	1 member of the municipal district council	Sigay, Ilocos Sur
November 11, 1969	Governor	Agusan del Sur
November 11, 1969	Vice governor	Agusan del Sur
November 11, 1969	3 members of the provincial board	Agusan del Sur
November 11, 1969	2 members of the provincial board	Kalinga-Apayao
November 11, 1969	2 members of the provincial board	Pampanga
November 11, 1969	1 member of the provincial board	Camiguin
November 11, 1969	1 member of the provincial board	Cebu
November 11, 1969	1 member of the provincial board	Cotabato
November 11, 1969	1 member of the provincial board	Iloilo
November 11, 1969	1 member of the provincial board	Masbate
November 11, 1969	1 member of the provincial board	Tarlac
November 11, 1969	1 member of the provincial board	Zambales
November 11, 1969	2 members of the city council	Angeles City
November 11, 1969	2 members of the city council	Cebu City
November 11, 1969	1 member of the city council	Cavite City, Cavite
November 11, 1969	1 member of the city council	Lapu-Lapu City, Cebu
November 11, 1969	1 member of the city council	Legazpi, Albay
November 11, 1969	1 member of the city council	Lucena
November 11, 1969	1 member of the city council	Ormoc
November 11, 1969	1 member of the city council	Roxas City, Capiz
November 11, 1969	1 member of the city council	Tacloban
November 11, 1969	Mayor and vice mayor	San Isidro, Bohol
November 11, 1969	Mayor and vice mayor	Alamada, Cotabato
November 11, 1969	Mayor and vice mayor	Bagumbayan, Cotabato
November 11, 1969	Mayor and vice mayor	Bingawan, Iloilo
November 11, 1969	Mayor and vice mayor	Lemery, Iloilo
November 11, 1969	Mayor and vice mayor	Tagoloan, Lanao del Norte
November 11, 1969	Mayor and vice mayor	Biri, Northern Samar
November 11, 1969	Mayor and vice mayor	Magsaysay, Occidental Mindoro
November 11, 1969	Mayor and vice mayor	Rizal, Occidental Mindoro
November 11, 1969	Mayor and vice mayor	Malungon, South Cotabato
November 11, 1969	Mayor and vice mayor	Tampakan, South Cotabato
November 11, 1969	Mayor and vice mayor	Alegria, Surigao del Norte
November 11, 1969	Mayor and vice mayor	Tagbina, Surigao del Sur
November 11, 1969	225 members of the municipal council	Various cities and municipalities
April 11, 1983	Municipal officials	San Fernando, Pampanga

==== Legislatures under the Local Government Code of 1991 ====
For permanent vacancies in the Sangguniang Panlalawigan (provincial boards), Sangguniang Panlungsod (city councils) of highly urbanized and independent component cities and Sangguniang Bayan (municipal councils) of component municipalities in Metro Manila (currently just Pateros), the president through the Executive Secretary appoints someone from the same political party where the person who caused the vacancy belonged. If the person who vacated the post did not belong to a political party, the local chief executive (the governor or mayor, as the case may be) appoints upon the recommendation of the sanggunian concerned. For vacancies in the city and municipal councils for component cities and municipalities outside Metro Manila, the same process applies, with the local chief executive appointing the replacement. For the Sangguniang Barangay (barangay councils) and Sangguniang Kabataan (youth councils), it shall be filled by the official next in rank. This means no special elections are held for local legislatures under the Local Government Code.

For an example of its application, in 2024, when Bamban mayor Alice Guo was dismissed by the Ombudsman, and while the vice mayor and nine other councilors were suspended for three months, the sole remaining councilor, Erano Timbang, was named by the Department of the Interior and Local Government as acting mayor, until the vice mayor serves out the suspension.

==== Bangsamoro Parliament ====
In the Bangsamoro Parliament created via the Bangsamoro Organic Law, a special election may be called if the vacating seat is from an unaffiliated member of parliament, and the vacancy happened at least one year before the next general election. If the vacancy is from an affiliated member of parliament, the party shall nominate a new member, and if it is a proportional seat, the party names the replacement.

==== Chief executives ====
The vice president, vice governor and vice mayor shall replace the president, governor and mayor, as the case may be, upon permanent vacancy, and shall serve until the next general election. For permanent vacancy for the barangay chairman, the highest-ranking member of the Sangguniang Barangay (the barangay councilor that received the most votes in the preceding election) shall replace the predecessor. No special election shall be called.

If a permanent vacancy for the president and vice president at the same time occurs, a special election will be called. An extraordinary special election was called in 1986.

==== Deputy of chief executives ====
Once a vacancy for the vice governor or vice mayor occurs, the highest-ranking member of the local legislature (the member that received the most votes in the preceding election) shall replace the predecessor. If that member belongs to a political party, that party will nominate a new member to the legislature. If that member is an independent, the president, governor or mayor will nominate a new member. No special election shall be called.

==== Prior to the Local Government Code of 1991 ====
Special elections were held when vacancies arose. These were numerous when the Philippines was an American colony.

== Delayed and rescheduled elections ==
=== President and vice president ===
Two presidential elections have been held outside of schedule. The first, which was supposed to be held in 1945, was delayed due to World War II, and was ultimately held in 1946. The second, which was supposed to be held in 1987, was held earlier than scheduled in February 1986. In both instances, the office of the presidency was not vacant.

Position	Date	Predecessor	Political party	Cause	Winner	Political party
President	April 23, 1946	Sergio Osmeña	Nacionalista	Delay of election due to World War II	Manuel Roxas	Liberal
Vice president	April 23, 1946	Vacant		Delay of election due to World War II	Elpidio Quirino	Liberal
President	February 7, 1986	Ferdinand Marcos	KBL	Called by the Batasang Pambansa upon orders by the president	Disputed (see below)	
Vice president	February 7, 1986	Vacant		Called by the Batasang Pambansa upon orders by the president	Disputed (see below)	

==== 1946 elections ====
Due to the Commonwealth of the Philippines government being driven into exile by World War II, the supposed midterm election in November 1943 and the general election in November 1945 were not held as scheduled. The Commonwealth government reconstituted itself in 1945 and some senators called for elections to be held right away. The United States Congress approved a joint resolution setting the date of the election on not later than April 30, 1946. The Commonwealth Congress then enacted a law, Commonwealth Act No. 725, setting the date of the election on April 23, 1946. Like most special elections though, the winners would serve only until 1949, or as if their terms started in 1945.

Manuel Roxas defeated the incumbent Sergio Osmeña, while the former's running mate Elpidio Quirino defeated Osmeña's running mate Eulogio Rodriguez. Senate and House of Representatives elections were also held on the same date.

===== President =====
Candidate	Party	Votes	%
Manuel Roxas	Nacionalista Party (Liberal wing) (Note: The Nacionalista Party was split into two wings: those who supported Osmeña or the "conservative wing", and those who supported Roxas or the "liberal wing". The liberal wing eventually split off after the election and became the Liberal Party.)	1,333,006	53.93
Sergio Osmeña	Nacionalista Party	1,129,994	45.72
Hilario Moncado	Modernist Party	8,538	0.35
Total		2,471,538	100.00
Valid votes		2,471,538	95.17
Invalid/blank votes		125,342	4.83
Total votes		2,596,880	100.00
Registered voters/turnout		2,898,604	89.59
Source: Nohlen, Grotz, Hartmann, Hasall and Santos

===== Vice president =====
Candidate	Party	Votes	%
Elpidio Quirino	Nacionalista Party (Liberal wing) (Note: The Nacionalista Party was split into two wings: those who supported Osmeña or the "conservative wing", and those who supported Roxas or the "liberal wing". The liberal wing eventually split off after the election and became the Liberal Party.)	1,161,725	52.36
Eulogio Rodriguez	Nacionalista Party	1,051,243	47.38
Lou Salvador	Modernist Party	5,879	0.26
Total		2,218,847	100.00
Valid votes		2,218,847	85.44
Invalid/blank votes		378,033	14.56
Total votes		2,596,880	100.00
Registered voters/turnout		2,898,604	89.59
Source: Nohlen, Grotz, Hartmann, Hasall and Santos

==== 1986 snap elections ====
In 1985, the Batasang Pambansa called a special election for the offices of president and vice president on February 7, 1986; unlike special elections elsewhere when it was called due to a vacancy, incumbent president Ferdinand Marcos did not relinquish his office, and that the winners will serve a full six-year term, instead of the remainder of the current term. The vice presidency, which was vacant after it was restored when a constitutional amendment was approved in a 1984 plebiscite, was also at stake. Marcos and his running mate, MP from Manila Arturo Tolentino, won their respective elections against Corazon Aquino and Salvador Laurel, but allegations of massive fraud led to the People Power Revolution a couple of weeks later that led to his ouster.

===== President (COMELEC) =====
Candidate	Party	Votes	%
Ferdinand Marcos (incumbent)	Kilusang Bagong Lipunan	10,807,197	53.62
Corazon Aquino	United Nationalist Democratic Organization	9,291,716	46.10
Reuben Canoy	Social Democratic Party	34,041	0.17
Narciso Padilla	Movement for Truth, Order and Righteousness	23,652	0.12
Total		20,156,606	100.00
Valid votes		20,156,606	97.30
Invalid/blank votes		559,469	2.70
Total votes		20,716,075	100.00
Registered voters/turnout		26,278,744	78.83
Source: Annex XXXVIII of the report by the International Observer Delegation

===== Vice president (COMELEC) =====
Candidate	Party	Votes	%
Arturo Tolentino	Kilusang Bagong Lipunan	10,134,130	50.66
Salvador Laurel	United Nationalist Democratic Organization	9,173,105	45.85
Eva Estrada Kalaw	Liberal Party (Kalaw wing) (Note: Kalaw ran under her own wing of the Liberal Party, while the rest of party supported Laurel's candidacy.)	662,185	3.31
Roger Arienda	Movement for Truth, Order and Righteousness	35,974	0.18
Total		20,005,394	100.00
Valid votes		20,005,394	96.57
Invalid/blank votes		710,681	3.43
Total votes		20,716,075	100.00
Registered voters/turnout		26,278,744	78.83
Source: Annex XXXVIII of the report by the International Observer Delegation

In the official results from COMELEC that were later used by the Batasang Pambansa to proclaim the winners, Marcos and Tolentino won over Aquino and Laurel respectively, while in the unofficial results from NAMFREL, Aquino and Laurel led over Marcos and Tolentino.

=== Other offices ===
On special elections due to delays, the Commission on Elections usually sets the vote a day later, or up to several weeks later. The latest date the commission set a delayed special election is a more than year later after the regular election, when it held the elections for provincial government officials of Sulu in October 1996 after being delayed since May 1995.

In 2010, due to the Supreme Court ruling the creation of the congressional district of Malolos as unconstitutional, the election at Bulacan's 1st congressional district originally scheduled for May 2010 was delayed. The ballots were originally printed with Malolos having a different set of candidates from the rest of the 1st district. The election proceeded in November 2010.

In 2018, the barangay elections in Marawi originally scheduled in May 2018 were done in September due to the aftermath of the siege of Marawi.

Barangay elections and regional elections rescheduled by Congress are not usually classified as "special elections".

== See also ==
- Recall elections in the Philippines
- Referendums in the Philippines
