= Surigao's at-large congressional district =

Legislative district of the Philippines

Surigao's at-large congressional district may refer to several occasions when a provincewide at-large district was used for elections to the various Philippine national legislatures from the historical province of Surigao.

The territory of the former Spanish colonial district of Surigao was first represented in the National Assembly of the First Philippine Republic known as the Malolos Congress. Following the establishment of a provincial government under U.S. civilian rule in 1901, a single-member district encompassing the entire province was created ahead of the elections for the first fully elected Philippine Assembly in 1907. The district also elected its representatives to the Commonwealth National Assembly following a shift to unicameral legislature in 1935, and was re-established as a plural member constituency ahead of the 1943 election for the Second Republic National Assembly. It elected a representative to the restored House of Representatives when the country returned to single-member electorates in 1945 and was also represented in the first four meetings under the Third Philippine Republic.

The district was abolished following the 1960 division of Surigao into two provinces which took effect in 1961.

== Representation history ==
| # | Term of office | | National Assembly | Seat A | | | | Seat B | | | |
| # | Start | End | National Assembly | Image | Member | Party | Electoral history | Image | Member | Party | Electoral history |
=== Surigao's at-large district for the Malolos Congress ===
District created June 18, 1898.
| – | September 15, 1898 | March 23, 1901 | 1st | | Timoteo Páez | Independent | Appointed. | | Tomás del Rosario | Independent | Appointed. |
| # | Term of office | | Legislature | Single seat | | | | Seats eliminated | | | |
| # | Start | End | Legislature | Image | Member | Party | Electoral history | Seats eliminated | | | |
| === Surigao's at-large district for the Philippine Assembly === | | | | | | | | Seats eliminated | | | |
| District re-created January 9, 1907. | | | | | | | | Seats eliminated | | | |
| 1 | October 16, 1907 | October 16, 1909 | 1st | | Francisco Soriano | Progresista | Elected in 1907. | Seats eliminated | | | |
| 2 | October 16, 1909 | May 31, 1910 | 2nd | | Manuel Gavieres | Nacionalista | Elected in 1909. Died. | Seats eliminated | | | |
| 3 | October 14, 1910 | October 16, 1916 | 2nd | | Inocencio Cortes | Nacionalista | Elected in 1910 to finish Gavieres's term. | Seats eliminated | | | |
| 3 | October 14, 1910 | October 16, 1916 | 3rd | | Inocencio Cortes | Nacionalista | Re-elected in 1912. | Seats eliminated | | | |
| # | Term of office | | Legislature | Single seat | | | | Seats eliminated | | | |
| # | Start | End | Legislature | Image | Member | Party | Electoral history | Seats eliminated | | | |
| === Surigao's at-large district for the House of Representatives of the Philippine Islands === | | | | | | | | Seats eliminated | | | |
| 4 | October 16, 1916 | June 6, 1922 | 4th | | Eusebio Tionko | Nacionalista | Elected in 1916. | Seats eliminated | | | |
| 4 | October 16, 1916 | June 6, 1922 | 5th | | Eusebio Tionko | Nacionalista | Re-elected in 1919. | Seats eliminated | | | |
| 5 | June 6, 1922 | June 2, 1925 | 6th | | Clementino Díez | Nacionalista; Unipersonalista | Elected in 1922. | Seats eliminated | | | |
| 6 | June 2, 1925 | June 2, 1931 | 7th | | Montano Ortiz | Demócrata | Elected in 1925. | Seats eliminated | | | |
| 6 | June 2, 1925 | June 2, 1931 | 8th | | Montano Ortiz | Demócrata | Re-elected in 1928. | Seats eliminated | | | |
| 7 | June 2, 1931 | June 5, 1934 | 9th | | Vicente Gonzaga | Nacionalista; Consolidado | Elected in 1931. | Seats eliminated | | | |
| 8 | June 5, 1934 | September 16, 1935 | 10th | | Ricardo Navarro | Nacionalista; Democrático | Elected in 1934. | Seats eliminated | | | |
| # | Term of office | | National Assembly | Single seat | | | | Seats eliminated | | | |
| # | Start | End | National Assembly | Image | Member | Party | Electoral history | Seats eliminated | | | |
| === Surigao's at-large district for the National Assembly (Commonwealth of the Philippines) === | | | | | | | | Seats eliminated | | | |
| (8) | 1936 | December 30, 1941 | 1st | | Ricardo Navarro | Nacionalista; Democrático | Declared winner of 1935 elections after an electoral protest. | Seats eliminated | | | |
| (8) | 1936 | December 30, 1941 | 2nd | | Ricardo Navarro | Nacionalista | Re-elected in 1938. | Seats eliminated | | | |
| # | Term of office | | National Assembly | Seat A | | | | Seat B | | | |
| # | Start | End | National Assembly | Image | Member | Party | Electoral history | Image | Member | Party | Electoral history |
=== Surigao's at-large district for the National Assembly (Second Philippine Republic) ===
District re-created September 7, 1943.
| – | September 25, 1943 | February 2, 1944 | 1st | | José D. Cortes | KALIBAPI | Elected in 1943. | | Fernando C. Silvosa | KALIBAPI | Appointed as an ex officio member. |
| # | Term of office | | Common wealth Congress | Single seat | | | | Seats eliminated | | | |
| # | Start | End | Common wealth Congress | Image | Member | Party | Electoral history | Seats eliminated | | | |
| === Surigao's at-large district for the House of Representatives of the Commonwealth of the Philippines === | | | | | | | | Seats eliminated | | | |
| District re-created May 24, 1945. | | | | | | | | Seats eliminated | | | |
| (8) | June 11, 1945 | May 25, 1946 | 1st | | Ricardo Navarro | Nacionalista | Re-elected in 1941. | Seats eliminated | | | |
| # | Term of office | | Congress | Single seat | | | | Seats eliminated | | | |
| # | Start | End | Congress | Image | Member | Party | Electoral history | Seats eliminated | | | |
| === Surigao's at-large district for the House of Representatives of the Philippines === | | | | | | | | Seats eliminated | | | |
| (8) | May 25, 1946 | December 30, 1949 | 1st | | Ricardo Navarro | Nacionalista | Re-elected in 1946. | Seats eliminated | | | |
| 9 | December 30, 1949 | December 30, 1951 | 2nd | | Felisberto M. Verano | Nacionalista | Elected in 1949. Resigned on election as senator. | Seats eliminated | | | |
| — | December 30, 1951 | December 30, 1953 | 2nd | vacant | | | No special election held to fill vacancy. | Seats eliminated | | | |
| 10 | December 30, 1953 | December 30, 1961 | 3rd | | Reynaldo P. Honrado | Nacionalista | Elected in 1953. | Seats eliminated | | | |
| 10 | December 30, 1953 | December 30, 1961 | 4th | | Reynaldo P. Honrado | Nacionalista | Re-elected in 1957. Redistricted to Surigao del Norte's at-large district. | Seats eliminated | | | |
| District dissolved into Surigao del Norte's and Surigao del Sur's at-large districts. | | | | | | | | Seats eliminated | | | |

== See also ==
- Legislative districts of Surigao del Norte
- Legislative districts of Surigao del Sur
