= Legislative districts of Surigao =

The legislative district of Surigao was the representation of the historical province of Surigao in the various national legislatures of the Philippines until the election of representatives for its successor provinces in 1961. The undivided province's representation encompassed the present-day provinces of Surigao del Norte, Surigao del Sur and Dinagat Islands.

== History ==
Surigao initially comprised a lone district for the purposes of electing representatives to the First Philippine Assembly in 1907. When seats for the upper house of the Philippine Legislature were elected from territory-based districts between 1916 and 1935, the province formed part of the eleventh senatorial district which elected two out of the 24-member Senate.

During the Second World War, two delegates represented Surigao in the National Assembly of the Japanese-sponsored Second Philippine Republic: one was the provincial governor (an ex officio member), while the other was elected through a provincial assembly of KALIBAPI members during the Japanese occupation of the Philippines. Upon the restoration of the Philippine Commonwealth in 1945, the province continued to constitute a single representative district.

The enactment of Republic Act No. 2786 on 19 June 1960 split Surigao into Surigao del Norte and Surigao del Sur, and provided each province separate representation in Congress. The new provinces first elected their separate representatives in the 1961 elections.

== Lone District (defunct) ==
| Period | Representative |
|---|---|
| 1st Philippine Legislature; 1907–1909 | Francisco Soriano |
| 2nd Philippine Legislature; 1909–1912 | Manuel G. Gavieres^{1} |
| 2nd Philippine Legislature; 1909–1912 | Inocencio Cortez^{2} |
| 3rd Philippine Legislature; 1912–1916 | Inocencio Cortez^{2} |
| 4th Philippine Legislature; 1916–1919 | Eusebio Tiongko |
| 5th Philippine Legislature; 1919–1922 | Eusebio Tiongko |
| 6th Philippine Legislature; 1922–1925 | Clemente V. Diez |
| 7th Philippine Legislature; 1925–1928 | Montano A. Ortiz |
| 8th Philippine Legislature; 1928–1931 | Montano A. Ortiz |
| 9th Philippine Legislature; 1931–1934 | Vicente Gonzaga |
| 10th Philippine Legislature; 1934–1935 | Ricardo Navarro |
| 1st National Assembly; 1935–1938 | Clementino V. Diez^{3} |
| 1st National Assembly; 1935–1938 | Ricardo Navarro^{4} |
| 2nd National Assembly; 1938–1941 | Ricardo Navarro^{4} |
| 3rd National Assembly; 1941–1946 | Ricardo Navarro^{4} |
| 1st Congress; 1946–1949 | Ricardo Navarro^{4} |
| 2nd Congress; 1949–1953 | Felixberto Verano^{5} |
| 2nd Congress; 1949–1953 | vacant |
| 3rd Congress; 1953–1957 | Reynaldo P. Honrado^{6} |
| 3rd Congress; 1953–1957 | vacant |
| 4th Congress; 1957–1961 | Reynaldo P. Honrado |

^1 Died in 1910.
^2 Assumed office after winning special election held on 14 October 1910 to fill vacant seat.
^3 Unseated in 1938 after losing election protest to Ricardo Navarro.
^4 Replaced Clementino V. Diez in 1938 after winning election protest and being rightfully declared elected.
^5 Elected in 1951 to the Senate; seat remained vacant until the end of the 2nd Congress.
^6 Appointed Justice of the Peace, 1955; seat remained vacant until the end of the 3rd Congress.

== At-Large (defunct) ==
| Period | Representatives |
|---|---|
| National Assembly; 1943–1944 | Jose D. Cortes |
| National Assembly; 1943–1944 | Fernando C. Silvosa (ex officio) |

== See also ==
- Legislative district of Surigao del Norte
  - Legislative district of Dinagat Islands
- Legislative district of Surigao del Sur
