= Constantino Navarro Sr. =

Filipino military officer and politician (1914–1998)

- Navarro's official portrait during the 8th Congress

Member of the Philippine House of Representatives from Surigao del Norte
- In office June 30, 1987 – June 30, 1992
- Preceded by: District reestablished (seat previously held by himself in 1984)
- Succeeded by: Robert Barbers
- Constituency: 2nd district
- In office December 30, 1965 – January 17, 1973
- Preceded by: Reynaldo Honrado
- Succeeded by: District abolished (seat later held by himself in 1984)
- Constituency: At-large district

Member of the Batasang Pambansa
- In office June 30, 1984 – March 25, 1986
- Constituency: Surigao del Norte
- In office June 12, 1978 – June 30, 1984 Serving with many others
- Constituency: Region X

Member of the Batasang Bayan
- In office September 21, 1976 – June 12, 1978

1st Governor of Surigao del Norte
- In office 1963 – December 30, 1965
- Vice Governor: Jose Sering
- Preceded by: Position established
- Succeeded by: Jose Sering

Governor of Surigao
- In office 1960–1963
- Preceded by: Bernardino Almeda
- Succeeded by: Position abolished

Personal details
- Born: November 11, 1914 Dapa, Surigao del Norte, Philippine Islands
- Died: May 11, 1998 (aged 83)
- Party: KBL (1978–1992); UPP (1987–1992)
- Other political affiliations: Nacionalista (1959–1963, 1969–1973); Liberal (1963–1969)
- Spouse: Helene Borromeo
- Children: 4, including Constantino Jr.
- Nickname: Oguing

Military service
- Allegiance: Philippines
- Branch/service: Philippine Constabulary; Philippine Army
- Years of service: 1935–1959
- Rank: Lieutenant colonel

Constantino Cervantes Navarro Sr. (November 11, 1914 – May 11, 1998) was a Filipino military officer and politician who served as the representative for Surigao del Norte's 2nd congressional district in the Philippine House of Representatives from 1987 to 1992. He previously represented Surigao del Norte's at-large district from 1965 to 1973 and served as governor of the undivided Surigao province from 1960 to 1963, governor of Surigao del Norte from 1963 to 1965, and as a member of the Batasang Pambansa, representing Region X from 1978 to 1984 and the province from 1984 to 1986.

== Early life and education ==
Constantino Cervantes Navarro was born on November 11, 1914, in Dapa, Surigao del Norte, to Enrique Navarro and Severa Cervantes. He attended Dapa Elementary School for his primary education and Surigao High School for his secondary education before teaching at Socorro Elementary School.

== Military career ==
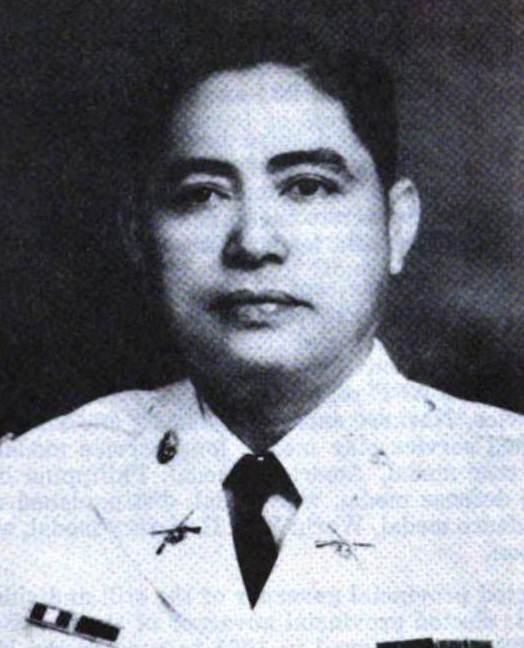
Navarro as a military officer

In 1935, Navarro enlisted in the Philippine Constabulary (PC) and was assigned to the 117th PC Company. In October 1936, he was transferred to the district training center at Camp Keithley in Dansalan (now Marawi), followed by an assignment to the Surigao cadre at Bad-as in January 1937. He was subsequently honorably discharged.

After completing a four-year advanced ROTC course, Navarro was commissioned as a third lieutenant in the Philippine Army and joined the Armed Forces of the Philippines (AFP). He served as a battalion commander in Cebu under Colonel James Cushing. Their command refused to surrender to Japanese forces, which reportedly offered a large bounty for his capture.

In 1951, Navarro was sent to Fort Gordon in Georgia as an army pensionado, where he attended the Provost Marshal School. Upon returning to the Philippines, he served as the PC provincial commander in Bohol from 1952 to 1956 and later as chief of the PC Criminal Investigation Service in 1958. He retired from the AFP regular force with the rank of lieutenant colonel in May 1959. Throughout his 23-year military career, he earned 18 medals and ribbons.

== Governor of Surigao (1960–1963) ==
In 1959, Navarro ran for governor of the undivided province of Surigao and won under the Nacionalista Party.

== Governor of Surigao del Norte (1963–1965) ==
Navarro later joined the Liberal Party and was elected governor of the newly created province of Surigao del Norte in 1963, winning 71% of the vote. He resigned in 1965 to run for the House of Representatives.

== House of Representatives (1965–1973) ==
In the 1965 elections, Navarro won the seat for Surigao del Norte's at-large congressional district as a Liberal, defeating two Nacionalista candidates with 38,803 votes (67.31%). During his first term, he served as vice chairman of the House Committee on National Defense and as a member of the committees on Agrarian and Social Welfare, Civil Service, Foreign Affairs, Franchises, Immigration and Naturalization, Mines, and War Veterans, as well as the Commission on Appointments.

In 1969, Navarro was re-elected under the Nacionalista Party and became chairman of the House Committee on National Defense. He served until Congress was abolished following President Ferdinand Marcos's declaration of martial law and the ratification of the 1973 Constitution.

== Batasang Bayan (1976-1978) ==
In 1976, Marcos appointed Navarro as an at-large regional representative to the Batasang Bayan, a legislative advisory council to the president.

== Batasang Pambansa (1978–1986) ==
In 1978, Navarro ran under the ruling Kilusang Bagong Lipunan (KBL) for a seat in the newly established Batasang Pambansa, representing Region X. He placed third, behind former vice president Emmanuel Pelaez and Bukidnon governor Cesar Fortich. He was re-elected in 1984, this time representing Surigao del Norte in a single-member district. As an assemblyman, Navarro served as vice chairman of the parliamentary committees on National Security and Defense and Peace and Order, and as a member of the committees on Appropriations and Reorganization, Finance, and Public Works and Highways. The Batasang Pambansa was abolished following the 1986 People Power Revolution, which installed Corazon Aquino as president and led to the promulgation of a provisional Constitution.

== Return to the House of Representatives (1987–1992) ==
Following the restoration of Congress in 1987, Navarro successfully ran for Surigao del Norte's 2nd congressional district under the KBL. He prevailed in the electoral protest filed by second-placer Claro Garcia after the House Electoral Tribunal dismissed the protest due to Garcia's non-compliance with the aforementioned resolution, indicating his desistance from pursuing the case and loss of interest in the protest.

As a member of the opposition, he joined the minority bloc during the speakership of Ramon Mitra Jr. By 1987, he was also serving as acting president of the KBL.

During the 8th Congress, Navarro served on the House committees on National Defense, Foreign Affairs, Natural Resources, Health, National Cultural Communities, Civil Service, and Public Order and Security as a member of the minority bloc. He retired after one congressional term, and his son, Constantino Jr., unsuccessfully sought his former seat against Robert Barbers.

== Personal life ==
Navarro was married to Helene Borromeo, with whom he had four children.

Navarro died on May 11, 1998.

== Electoral history ==
Electoral history of Constantino Navarro Sr.
Year	Office	Party	Votes received				Result
Year	Office	Party	Total	%	P.	Swing	Result
1959	Governor of Surigao	Nacionalista	—N/a	—N/a	1st	—N/a	Won
1963	Governor of Surigao del Norte	Liberal	—N/a	—N/a	1st	—N/a	Won
1965	Representative (Surigao del Norte)	Liberal	38,803	67.31%	1st	—N/a	Won
1969	Representative (Surigao del Norte)	Nacionalista	—N/a	—N/a	1st	—N/a	Won
1978	Assemblyman (Region X)	KBL	495,328	6.38%	3rd	—N/a	Won
1984	Assemblyman (Surigao del Norte)	KBL	78,519	—N/a	1st	—N/a	Won
1987	Representative (Surigao del Norte–2nd)	KBL	—N/a	—N/a	1st	—N/a	Won

== Honors and decorations ==
=== National honors ===
- Distinguished Service Star
- AFP Long Service Medal
- Military Merit Medal
- Philippine Independence Medal
- Philippine Liberation Medal

=== Foreign honors ===
- Bronze Star Medal
- American Defense Service Medal
- Asiatic–Pacific Campaign Medal
- World War II Victory Medal

House of Representatives of the Philippines
New district	Member of the Philippine House of Representatives for Surigao del Norte's 2nd district 1987–1992	Succeeded by Robert Barbers
Preceded by Reynaldo Honrado	Member of the Philippine House of Representatives for Surigao del Norte's at-large district 1965–1973	Vacant Martial law and adoption of the 1973 Constitution Title next held by Himself (in the Batasang Pambansa)
New district	Member of the Batasang Pambansa from Surigao del Norte; 1984–1986	District abolished
New district	Member of the Batasang Pambansa from Region X 1978–1984; With: Many others	District abolished
Political offices
New title	Governor of Surigao del Norte; 1963–1965	Succeeded by Jose Sering
Preceded by Bernardino Almeda	Governor of Surigao; 1960–1963	Position abolished
