= Surigao del Norte's at-large congressional district =

Legislative district of the Philippines

Surigao del Norte's at-large congressional district is a defunct congressional district that encompassed the entire province of Surigao del Norte in the Philippines. It was represented in the House of Representatives from 1961 to 1972 and in the Regular Batasang Pambansa from 1984 to 1986. The province of Surigao del Norte was created as a result of the partition of Surigao in 1960 and elected its first representative provincewide at-large during the 1961 Philippine House of Representatives elections. The district remained a single-member district until the dissolution of the lower house in 1972. It was later absorbed by the multi-member Region X's at-large district for the national parliament in 1978. In 1984, provincial and city representations were restored and Surigao del Norte elected one member for the regular parliament. The district was abolished following the 1987 reapportionment to establish two districts in the province under a new constitution.

== Representation history ==
#	Image	Member	Term of office		Congress	Party	Electoral history
#	Image	Member	Start	End	Congress	Party	Electoral history
=== Surigao del Norte's at-large district for the House of Representatives of the Philippines ===
District created June 19, 1960.
1		Reynaldo P. Honrado	December 30, 1961	December 30, 1965	5th	Nacionalista	Redistricted from Surigao's at-large district and re-elected in 1961.
2		Constantino Navarro Sr.	December 30, 1965	September 23, 1972	6th	Liberal	Elected in 1965.
2		Constantino Navarro Sr.	December 30, 1965	September 23, 1972	7th	Nacionalista	Re-elected in 1969. Removed from office after imposition of martial law.
District dissolved into the nine-seat Region X's at-large district for the Interim Batasang Pambansa.
#	Image	Member	Term of office		Batasang Pambansa	Party	Electoral history
#	Image	Member	Start	End	Batasang Pambansa	Party	Electoral history
=== Surigao del Norte's at-large district for the Regular Batasang Pambansa ===
District re-created February 1, 1984.
(2)		Constantino Navarro Sr.	July 23, 1984	March 25, 1986	2nd	KBL	Elected in 1984.
District dissolved into Surigao del Norte's 1st and 2nd districts.

== See also ==
- Legislative districts of Surigao del Norte
