= 1910 Surigao's at-large Philippine Assembly district special election =

A special election (known elsewhere as "by-elections") for the seat of Surigao's at-large district in the Philippine Assembly, the lower house of the Philippine Legislature of the Insular Government of the Philippine Islands, was held on October 14, 1910. This was triggered due to the death of the incumbent Manuel Gavieres. Governor-General William Cameron Forbes ordered the election to take place. Surigao's at-large district comprises the entire province of Surigao. Inocencio Cortes won the special election, retaining Nacionalista Party's control over the seat and served the remainder of Gavieres's term during the 2nd Philippine Legislature, which ended in 1912.

== Result ==
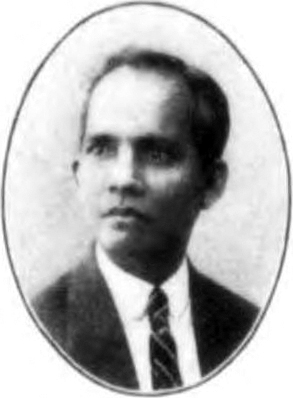
Inocencio Cortes was declared winner of the special election.

1910 Surigao's at-large Philippine Assembly district special election
Candidate	Party	Votes	%
Inocencio Cortes	Nacionalista Party	315	44.37
Pio Caimo		209	29.44
Emilio Pineda		186	26.20
Total		710	100.00
Majority		106	14.93
Nacionalista hold			

== Aftermath ==
Inocencio Cortes successfully defended his seat in 1912, serving for another term until 1916.
