= Sergio P. Corpus =

Filipino businessman (1913–2004)

- Born: Antonio Sergio Pablo Corpus; September 9, 1913
- Died: February 17, 2004 (aged 90)
- Occupation: Businessman

A. Sergio P. Corpus (9 September 1913 – 17 February 2004) was a Filipino businessman who became a Chairman and President of some insurance companies, a co-founder of an insurance association and the head of an insurance institute.

== Family ==
He was the son of Rafael Corpus who represented Zambales as an Assemblyman in the Third Philippine Legislature (1912-1916). He was married to Clara Oben with whom he had four children—Maria Cristina Teresita, Antonio Maria, Maria Clara Veronica and Luis Maria.

== Education ==
Corpus finished high school at the Ateneo de Manila University in 1932.

He graduated with a Bachelor of Science in Commerce degree at the De La Salle University in 1935. In his senior year, he was Editor in Chief of THE LASALLITE, the school organ, and Captain of the Senior Varsity Basketball team. He graduated with a Master of Arts degree at the Ateneo de Manila University in 1955.

== Business Organizations & affiliations ==
Corpus was one of the founders of the Management Association of the Philippines and was its second President in 1952. He was a co-founder of the Philippine Insurers Club on January 12, 1952 and was its first President.

He was Chairman and President of Empire Insurance Company from 1997 to 1999 and was its Chairman from 1999 to 2004. He was the Chairman and President of the Rizal-Empire Insurance Group from 1974 to 1996. He was an original Director of Philippine Prudential Life Insurance Co., Inc.

== Educational institutes ==
He was the Vice-Chairman of the Insurance Institute for Asia and the Pacific from 1978 to 1987, its President from 1989 to 1991 and its Chairman from 1991 to 1994.

He was the Dean of the Ateneo Graduate School of Economics and Business Administration from 1960 to 1966. He was the Dean of the Ateneo Graduate School of Business from 1969 to 1973.

== Private life and Death ==
Corpus was a co-founder of the First Friday Club and was the Chairman of the Clara O. Corpus Foundation, Inc. from 2001 to 2003.

He died on February 17, 2004.
