= 1909 Philippine Assembly elections =

2nd Philippine Assembly elections

- November 2, 1909

All 81 seats in the Philippine Assembly 41 seats needed for a majority
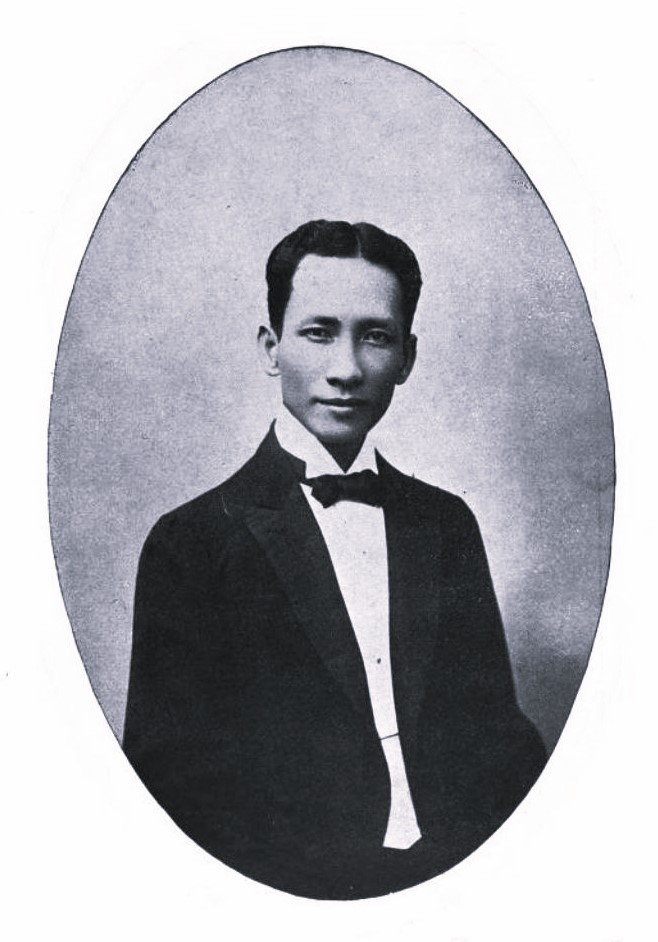

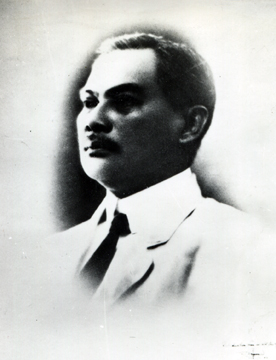
	Majority party	Minority party
Leader	Sergio Osmeña	Arsenio Cruz-Herrera
Party	Nacionalista	Progresista
Leader's seat	Cebu–2nd	Rizal–1st (lost)
Last election	32 seats, 34.89%	16 seats, 24.67%
Seats won	62	17
Seat change	▲3	▲1
Popular vote	92,996	38,588
Percentage	48.19%	20.00%
Swing	▲13.30%	▼0.87%
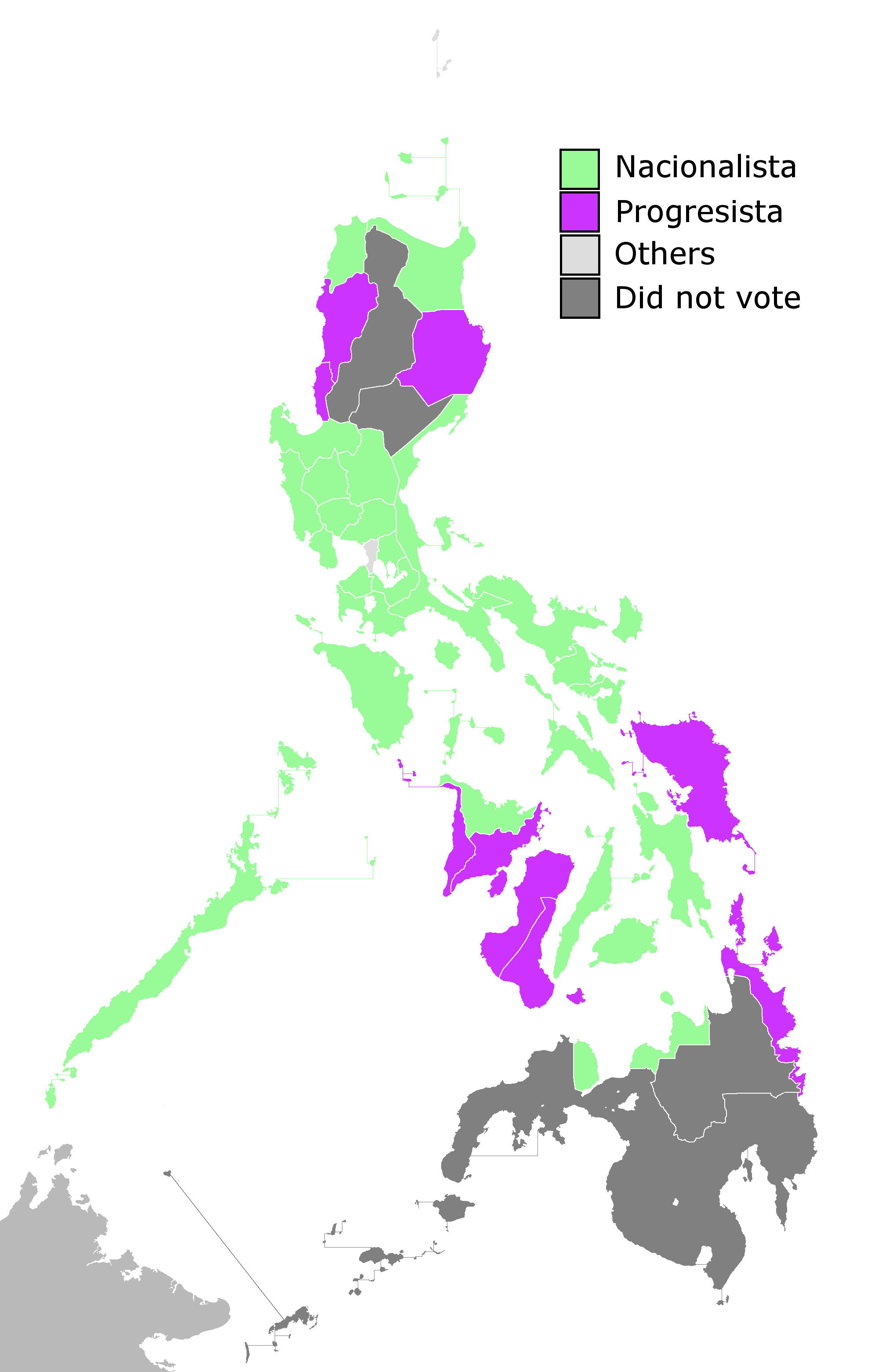
- Parties that won a plurality of votes in each province. Results for local offices are also included as a separate tally for the Philippine Assembly was not provided.
Speaker before election
Sergio Osmeña
Nacionalista
Elected Speaker
Sergio Osmeña
Nacionalista

Philippine Assembly elections were held in the Philippines on November 2, 1909. The election saw one additional seat for the province of Batanes, which has its own representation as an at-large district. The elected representatives would serve in the 2nd Philippine Legislature from 1909 to 1912.

== Results ==
↓

62	17	2
Nacionalista	Progresista	O

Party	Votes	%	+/–	Seats	+/–
Nacionalista Party	92,996	48.19	+12.48	62	+30
Progresista Party	38,588	20.00	−5.25	17	+1
Liguero	3,621	1.88	New	0	0
Others	47,306	24.51	NA	0	0
Independent	10,464	5.42	−18.42	2	−18
Total	192,975	100.00	–	81	+1
Registered voters/turnout	208,845	–			

Vote share
NP	48.19%
PP	20.00%
Others	31.81%

Seats
NP	76.54%
PP	20.99%
Others	2.47%

=== Votes by province ===
Province/City	Electorate	Turnout	NP	PP	Liguero	Ind.	Unknown
Albay	8,446	7,608	3,502	623	–	2,155	904
Ambos Camarines	6,706	6,589	3,272	338	–	1,293	1,322
Antique	2,378	2,283	564	756	–	135	459
Bataan	1,259	1,221	1,003	–	–	122	43
Batanes	350	343	–	–	–	325	–
Batangas	7,481	7,367	5,037	537	–	449	497
Bohol	2,893	2,689	2,487	–	–	–	205
Bulacan	9,502	8,989	8,346	–	–	–	–
Cagayan	6,929	6,646	3,344	–	–	2,260	618
Capiz	6,667	6,411	3,483	2,318	8	125	164
Cavite	8,587	7,637	3,133	–	–	895	2,941
Cebu	10,903	9,894	8,698	161	–	–	738
Ilocos Norte	5,380	5,227	1,756	592	–	–	2,654
Ilocos Sur	7,075	6,925	1,695	3,554	–	266	1,050
Iloilo	19,887	13,978	5,600	6,208	–	–	1,014
Isabela	3,616	3,385	1,231	1,353	–	–	143
La Laguna	6,821	6,358	3,048	1,631	–	–	1,411
La Union	4,775	4,683	1,606	1,718	–	–	1,196
Leyte	8,930	8,341	6,042	243	238	159	679
Manila	6,739	6,024	1,984	993	2,330	–	–
Mindoro	460	460	370	–	–	–	–
Misamis	2,828	2,320	1,877	–	–	–	351
Negros Occidental	6,528	6,315	1,657	2,456	–	–	705
Negros Oriental	2,757	2,480	–	1,727	–	610	100
Nueva Ecija	4,304	4,083	2,221	1,435	–	124	165
Palawan	379	358	344	11	–	–	–
Pampanga	5,623	5,623	2,296	1,498	–	418	–
Pangasinan	14,955	14,593	3,027	1,708	–	182	4,060
Rizal	5,943	5,807	2,055	1,556	–	349	1,221
Samar	4,780	4,584	1,130	2,191	–	–	523
Sorsogon	5,898	5,693	2,714	370	–	447	1,629
Surigao	1,345	1,211	423	556	–	150	–
Tarlac	5,474	5,114	2,561	1,636	1,045	–	–
Tayabas	9,940	9,454	5,106	2,303	–	–	1,116
Zambales	2,307	2,282	1,384	116	–	–	504
Total	208,845	192,975	92,996	38,588	3,621	10,464	26,412
Source: Government Printing Office

== See also ==
- 2nd Philippine Legislature
