= Region X's at-large parliamentary district =

Former Philippine parliamentary district

Northern Mindanao's at-large parliamentary district
- Former constituency for the Interim Batasang Pambansa

Former constituency
- Created: 1978
- Abolished: 1984
- Seats: 9

Northern Mindanao's at-large parliamentary district (also known as Region X's at-large parliamentary district) was a constituency for the Interim Batasang Pambansa, the legislature of the Philippines from 1978 to 1984. It encompassed the provinces of Agusan del Norte, Agusan del Sur, Bukidnon, Camiguin, Dinagat Islands, Misamis Occidental, Misamis Oriental, and Surigao del Norte, together with the cities of Butuan, Cagayan de Oro, Gingoog, Oroquieta, Ozamiz, Surigao, and Tangub.

The district had 9 seats in the assembly, 8 of which were held by members of the ruling party Kilusang Bagong Lipunan, and 1 by a member of the regional party Mindanao Alliance.

== List of assemblymen representing the district ==
=== Batasang Pambansa (1978–1986) ===
Portrait	Member (Lifespan) (Province/City)	Term of office	Party	Legislature	Electoral history	Constituencies
District established February 7, 1978.
	Edelmiro Amante (1933–2013) (Agusan del Norte)	June 12, 1978 – June 30, 1984	KBL	Interim Batasang Pambansa	Elected in 1978.	1978–1984; Provinces: Agusan del Norte, Agusan del Sur, Bukidnon, Camiguin, Dinagat Islands, Misamis Occidental, Misamis Oriental, Surigao del Norte Cities: Butuan, Cagayan de Oro, Gingoog, Oroquieta, Ozamiz, Surigao, Tangub
	Reuben Canoy (1929–2022) (Cagayan de Oro City)	June 12, 1978 – June 30, 1984	Mindanao Alliance	Interim Batasang Pambansa	Elected in 1978.	1978–1984; Provinces: Agusan del Norte, Agusan del Sur, Bukidnon, Camiguin, Dinagat Islands, Misamis Occidental, Misamis Oriental, Surigao del Norte Cities: Butuan, Cagayan de Oro, Gingoog, Oroquieta, Ozamiz, Surigao, Tangub
	Concordio Diel (Cagayan de Oro City)	June 12, 1978 – June 30, 1984	KBL	Interim Batasang Pambansa	Elected in 1978.	1978–1984; Provinces: Agusan del Norte, Agusan del Sur, Bukidnon, Camiguin, Dinagat Islands, Misamis Occidental, Misamis Oriental, Surigao del Norte Cities: Butuan, Cagayan de Oro, Gingoog, Oroquieta, Ozamiz, Surigao, Tangub
	Carlos Fortich (Bukidnon)	June 12, 1978 – June 30, 1984	KBL	Interim Batasang Pambansa	Elected in 1978.	1978–1984; Provinces: Agusan del Norte, Agusan del Sur, Bukidnon, Camiguin, Dinagat Islands, Misamis Occidental, Misamis Oriental, Surigao del Norte Cities: Butuan, Cagayan de Oro, Gingoog, Oroquieta, Ozamiz, Surigao, Tangub
	Constantino Navarro Sr. (1914–1998) (Surigao del Norte)	June 12, 1978 – June 30, 1984	KBL	Interim Batasang Pambansa	Elected in 1978.	1978–1984; Provinces: Agusan del Norte, Agusan del Sur, Bukidnon, Camiguin, Dinagat Islands, Misamis Occidental, Misamis Oriental, Surigao del Norte Cities: Butuan, Cagayan de Oro, Gingoog, Oroquieta, Ozamiz, Surigao, Tangub
	Liliano Neri (Ozamiz City)	June 12, 1978 – August 24, 1978 (Note: Died in office.)	KBL	Interim Batasang Pambansa	Elected in 1978. Died.	1978–1984; Provinces: Agusan del Norte, Agusan del Sur, Bukidnon, Camiguin, Dinagat Islands, Misamis Occidental, Misamis Oriental, Surigao del Norte Cities: Butuan, Cagayan de Oro, Gingoog, Oroquieta, Ozamiz, Surigao, Tangub
	Emmanuel Pelaez (1915–2003) (Cagayan de Oro City)	June 12, 1978 – June 30, 1984	KBL	Interim Batasang Pambansa	Elected in 1978.	1978–1984; Provinces: Agusan del Norte, Agusan del Sur, Bukidnon, Camiguin, Dinagat Islands, Misamis Occidental, Misamis Oriental, Surigao del Norte Cities: Butuan, Cagayan de Oro, Gingoog, Oroquieta, Ozamiz, Surigao, Tangub
	Henry Regalado (Oroquieta City)	June 12, 1978 – June 30, 1984	KBL	Interim Batasang Pambansa	Elected in 1978.	1978–1984; Provinces: Agusan del Norte, Agusan del Sur, Bukidnon, Camiguin, Dinagat Islands, Misamis Occidental, Misamis Oriental, Surigao del Norte Cities: Butuan, Cagayan de Oro, Gingoog, Oroquieta, Ozamiz, Surigao, Tangub
	Antonio Tupaz (1935–2008) (Butuan City)	June 12, 1978 – June 30, 1984	KBL	Interim Batasang Pambansa	Elected in 1978.	1978–1984; Provinces: Agusan del Norte, Agusan del Sur, Bukidnon, Camiguin, Dinagat Islands, Misamis Occidental, Misamis Oriental, Surigao del Norte Cities: Butuan, Cagayan de Oro, Gingoog, Oroquieta, Ozamiz, Surigao, Tangub
District dissolved into Agusan del Norte's at-large, Agusan del Sur's at-large, Bukidnon's at-large, Camiguin's at-large, Misamis Occidental's at-large, Misamis Oriental's at-large, and Surigao del Norte's at-large districts.

== Election results ==
=== 1978 ===
Candidate	Party	Votes	%
Emmanuel Pelaez	KBL	543,336	7.00
Carlos Fortich	KBL	500,619	6.45
Constantino Navarro Sr.	KBL	495,328	6.38
Antonio Tupaz	KBL	485,227	6.25
Liliano Neri	KBL	485,050	6.25
Henry Regalado	KBL	480,371	6.19
Concordio Diel	KBL	480,359	6.19
Edelmiro Amante	KBL	473,909	6.11
Reuben Canoy	Mindanao Alliance	459,896	5.93
Antonio Dugenio	KBL	440,559	5.68
Homobono Adaza	Mindanao Alliance	406,543	5.24
Rolando Geotina	Mindanao Alliance	375,964	4.85
Artemio Baluma	Mindanao Alliance	339,098	4.37
Pedro Romualdo	Mindanao Alliance	334,143	4.31
Jose Lim Jr.	Mindanao Alliance	330,107	4.25
Adolfo Murallon	Mindanao Alliance	328,584	4.23
Clementino Estella Jr.	Mindanao Alliance	321,757	4.15
Wilfredo Linaac	Mindanao Alliance	316,135	4.07
Caesar Calo	Independent	38,135	0.49
Antonio Edralin	Independent	25,934	0.33
Conrado Leonardo	Partido ng Bagong Pilipino	21,066	0.27
Marciano Cerna Jr.	Independent	17,203	0.22
Policaruso Busig	Independent	13,333	0.17
Epimaco Densing Jr.	Independent	13,044	0.17
Generoso Sansaet	Independent	12,953	0.17
Lucio Hingpit	Sovereign Citizens Party	6,272	0.08
Jose Leuterio	Independent	6,031	0.08
Rodulfo Ceniza	Independent	5,824	0.08
Simforoso Grana	Independent	2,102	0.03
Total		7,758,882	100.00
Total votes		973,912	–
Registered voters/turnout		1,148,572	84.79
