= Felisberto Verano =

Filipino politician (1905–?)

The Honorable Felisberto Verano
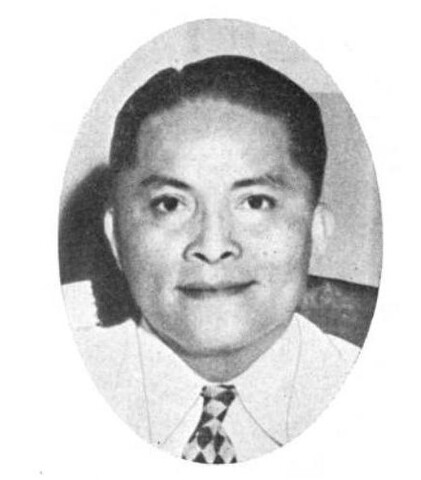
- Verano official portrait during the 2nd Congress.

Senator of the Philippines
- In office 30 December 1951 – 30 December 1953

Member of the Philippine House of Representatives from Surigao's Lone district
- In office 30 December 1949 – 30 December 1951
- Preceded by: Ricardo Navarro
- Succeeded by: Reynaldo Honrado

Deputy Governor of Surigao
- In office 1937–1940

Personal details
- Born: Felisberto Montenegro Verano; August 23, 1905 Bislig, Surigao, Philippine Islands
- Party: Nacionalista
- Spouse: Trinidad Lizarraga
- Children: 3

Felisberto Montenegro Verano (August 23, 1905 – ?) was a Filipino politician.

== Early life ==
Felisberto Verano was born on August 23, 1905, in Bislig, Surigao to Mariano Verano and Isidra Montenegro.

== Political career ==
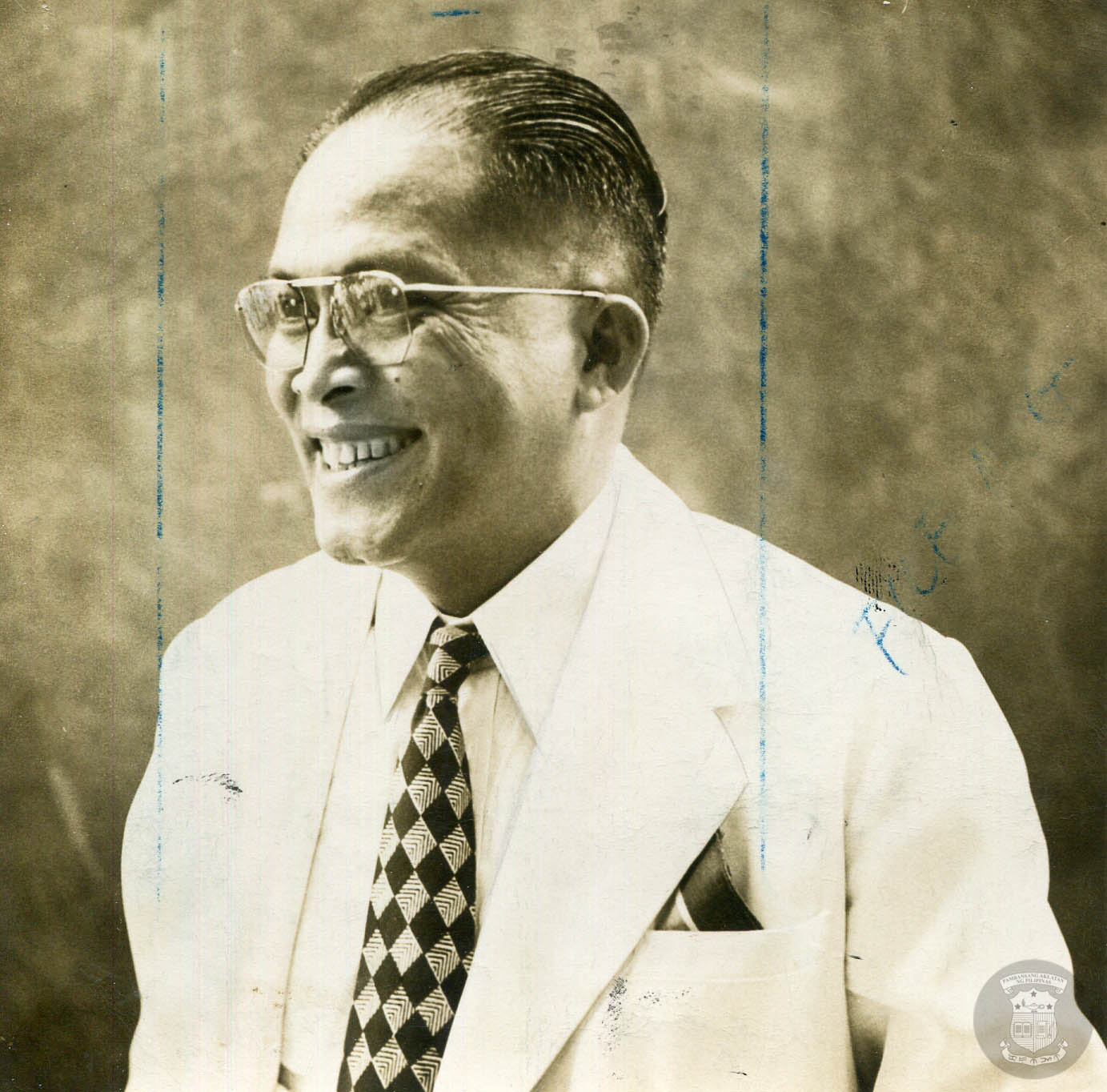
Verano during his tenure as senator

From 1937 to 1940, Verano was deputy governor of Surigao. During World War II, he joined the guerrilla movement against the Japanese occupation. After the war, Verano served as technical assistant to Presidents Manuel Roxas and Elpidio Quirino from 1946 to 1949.

In the 1949 Philippine election, Verano was elected to the Philippine House of Representatives on behalf of Surigao's lone district. His term, originally scheduled to last expire in 1953, ended prematurely in 1951 when he was elected in a special election (concurrent with the regular election) to complete the remainder of the tenure of Fernando Lopez, who was elected Vice President of the Philippines in 1949. He ran for re-election in 1953, but lost.

== Personal life ==
Verano was married to Trinidad Lizarraga and had three children including Lorna Verano-Yap (1951–2018), representative of the lone district of Pasay in the House of Representatives from 1987 to 1992.
