= Rafael Corpus =

Filipino economist, politician and statesman

The Honorable Rafael Corpus
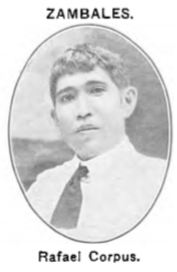
- Corpus as member of the Philippine Assembly, c. 1913

Secretary of Agriculture and Natural Resources
- In office November 2, 1921 – July 17, 1923
- Preceded by: Galicano Apacible
- Succeeded by: Silverio Apostol

Solicitor General of the Philippines
- In office July 1, 1914 – December 31, 1916
- Preceded by: George R. Harvey
- Succeeded by: Quintín Paredes

Member of the Philippine Assembly from Zambales's lone district
- In office October 16, 1912 – April 1, 1914
- Preceded by: Gabriel Alba
- Succeeded by: Gabriel Alba

Personal details
- Born: Rafael Corpus y Mislán; October 24, 1880 San Antonio, Zambales, Captaincy General of the Philippines
- Died: July 21, 1960 (aged 79)
- Party: Nacionalista

Rafael Corpus y Mislán (October 24, 1880 – July 21, 1960) was a Filipino economist, politician, and statesman who served as both chairman and president of the Philippine National Bank.

== Early life and education ==
Corpus was born in San Antonio, Zambales, Philippines, and finished his Bachelor of Arts degree at the Ateneo de Manila University in 1897. He then studied at the University of Santo Tomas and later studied law at Escuela de Derecho in 1903. He then went to the United States to take up a post graduate course at George Washington University in 1905.

== Career ==
He represented the province of Zambales's lone district as an assemblyman in the Third Philippine Legislature in 1912. He was appointed Solicitor General in 1914, a position he held until 1916. He became Secretary of Agriculture and Natural Resources in 1922. During the so-called Cabinet Crisis of 1923, he, together with other Cabinet Secretaries, resigned en masse over a dispute with Governor General Leonard Wood. He was the Chairman of the Philippine National Bank from 1923 to 1931 before becoming its President from 1932–1935. He was a member of the first Monetary Board of the Central Bank of the Philippines in 1949. He devoted more than thirty years to public service occupying various other important government positions.

== Personal life ==
A nephew of the philanthropist Teodoro R. Yangco, he successfully managed the latter's various business enterprises and became Administrator of his Estate.

He was married to Eluteria Pablo with whom he had six children, including Sergio P. Corpus, a notable businessman.
