= Zambales's at-large congressional district =

Legislative district of the Philippines

Zambales's at-large congressional district refers to the lone congressional district of the Philippines in the province of Zambales for various national legislatures before 1987. The province elected its representatives province-wide at-large from its reorganization under Article 6 of the Decreto de 18 junio de 1898 y las instrucciones sobre el régimen de las provincias y pueblos for the Malolos Congress in 1898 until the reapportionment in 1987 under Section 1 of the ordinance annex of the 1987 Constitution of the Philippines which created its first and second districts. It was a single-member district throughout the ten legislatures of the Insular Government of the Philippine Islands from 1907 to 1935, the three legislatures of the Philippine Commonwealth from 1935 to 1946, the seven congresses of the Third Philippine Republic from 1946 to 1972, and the national parliament of the Fourth Philippine Republic from 1984 to 1986.

On two occasions in its history, Zambales sent more than one member to the national legislatures who were also elected or appointed at-large. Three representatives were sent to the National Assembly (Malolos Congress) of the First Philippine Republic from 1898 to 1901 and two representatives to the National Assembly of the Second Philippine Republic from 1943 to 1944.

After 1986, all representatives were elected from its two congressional districts.

== Representation history ==
#	Term of office		National Assembly	Seat A				Seat B				Seat C			
#	Start	End	National Assembly	Image	Member	Party	Electoral history	Image	Member	Party	Electoral history	Image	Member	Party	Electoral history
=== Zambales's at-large district for the Malolos Congress ===
District created June 18, 1898.
–	September 15, 1898	March 23, 1901	1st		Juan Manday Gabriel	Independent	Elected in 1898.		Alejandro Albert	Independent	Appointed.		Félix Bautista	Independent	Appointed
#	Term of office		Legislature	Single seat				Seats eliminated							
#	Start	End	Legislature	Image	Member	Party	Electoral history	Seats eliminated							
=== Zambales's at-large district for the Philippine Assembly ===								Seats eliminated							
District re-created January 9, 1907.								Seats eliminated							
1	October 16, 1907	July 20, 1911	1st		Alberto Barretto	Nacionalista	Elected in 1907.	Seats eliminated							
1	October 16, 1907	July 20, 1911	2nd		Alberto Barretto	Nacionalista	Re-elected in 1909. Resigned on appointment as Court of First Instance judge.	Seats eliminated							
2	October 3, 1911	October 16, 1912	2nd		Gabriel Alba	Nacionalista	Elected in 1911 to finish Barretto's term.	Seats eliminated							
3	October 16, 1912	April 1, 1914	3rd		Rafael Corpus	Nacionalista	Elected in 1912. Resigned on appointment as Solicitor General.	Seats eliminated							
(2)	July 22, 1914	October 16, 1916	3rd		Gabriel Alba	Nacionalista	Elected in 1914 to finish Corpus's term.	Seats eliminated							
#	Term of office		Legislature	Single seat				Seats eliminated							
#	Start	End	Legislature	Image	Member	Party	Electoral history	Seats eliminated							
=== Zambales's at-large district for the House of Representatives of the Philippine Islands ===								Seats eliminated							
4	October 16, 1916	June 6, 1922	4th		Guillermo Pablo	Nacionalista	Elected in 1916.	Seats eliminated							
4	October 16, 1916	June 6, 1922	5th		Guillermo Pablo	Nacionalista	Re-elected in 1919.	Seats eliminated							
5	June 6, 1922	June 5, 1928	6th		Alejo Labrador	Independent	Elected in 1922.	Seats eliminated							
5	June 6, 1922	June 5, 1928	7th		Alejo Labrador	Nacionalista; Consolidado	Re-elected in 1925.	Seats eliminated							
6	June 5, 1928	March 1, 1933	8th		Gregorio Anonas	Nacionalista; Consolidado	Elected in 1928.	Seats eliminated							
6	June 5, 1928	March 1, 1933	9th		Gregorio Anonas	Nacionalista; Consolidado	Re-elected in 1931. Resigned on appointment as Department of Public Works and Communications undersecretary.	Seats eliminated							
7	April 1, 1933	June 5, 1934	9th		Mariano Alisangco	Independent	Elected in 1933 to finish Anonas's term.	Seats eliminated							
8	June 5, 1934	September 16, 1935	10th		Felipe Estella	Nacionalista; Democrático	Elected in 1934.	Seats eliminated							
#	Term of office		National Assembly	Single seat				Seats eliminated							
#	Start	End	National Assembly	Image	Member	Party	Electoral history	Seats eliminated							
=== Zambales's at-large district for the National Assembly (Commonwealth of the Philippines) ===								Seats eliminated							
9	September 16, 1935	December 30, 1938	1st		Potenciano Lesaca	Nacionalista; Democrático	Elected in 1935.	Seats eliminated							
10	December 30, 1938	December 30, 1941	2nd		Valentín S. Afable	Nacionalista	Elected in 1938.	Seats eliminated							
#	Term of office		National Assembly	Seat A				Seat B				Seats restored			
#	Start	End	National Assembly	Image	Member	Party	Electoral history	Image	Member	Party	Electoral history	Seats restored			
=== Zambales's at-large district for the National Assembly (Second Philippine Republic) ===												Seats restored			
District re-created September 7, 1943.												Seats restored			
–	September 25, 1943	February 2, 1944	1st		Valentín S. Afable	KALIBAPI	Elected in 1943.		Francisco Dantes	KALIBAPI	Appointed as an ex officio member.	Seats restored			
#	Term of office		Common wealth Congress	Single seat				Seats eliminated							
#	Start	End	Common wealth Congress	Image	Member	Party	Electoral history	Seats eliminated							
=== Zambales's at-large district for the House of Representatives of the Commonwealth of the Philippines ===								Seats eliminated							
District re-created May 24, 1945.								Seats eliminated							
(10)	June 9, 1945	May 25, 1946	1st		Valentín S. Afable	Nacionalista	Re-elected in 1941.	Seats eliminated							
#	Term of office		Congress	Single seat				Seats eliminated							
#	Start	End	Congress	Image	Member	Party	Electoral history	Seats eliminated							
=== Zambales's at-large district for the House of Representatives of the Philippines ===								Seats eliminated							
11	May 25, 1946	September 1, 1950	1st		Ramón Magsaysay	Liberal	Elected in 1946.	Seats eliminated							
11	May 25, 1946	September 1, 1950	2nd		Ramón Magsaysay	Liberal	Re-elected in 1949. Resigned on appointment as Secretary of National Defense.	Seats eliminated							
12	January 28, 1952	December 30, 1953	2nd		César Miraflor	Liberal	Elected in 1951 to finish Magsaysay's term.	Seats eliminated							
13	December 30, 1953	December 30, 1957	3rd		Enrique J. Corpus	Nacionalista	Elected in 1953.	Seats eliminated							
14	December 30, 1957	January 25, 1960	4th		Genaro Magsaysay	Nacionalista	Elected in 1957. Resigned on election as senator.	Seats eliminated							
15	December 30, 1961	December 30, 1965	5th		Virgilio L. Afable	Nacionalista	Elected in 1961.	Seats eliminated							
16	December 30, 1965	December 30, 1969	6th		Ramón Magsaysay Jr.	Liberal	Elected in 1965.	Seats eliminated							
17	December 30, 1969	September 23, 1972	7th		Antonio Díaz	Nacionalista	Elected in 1969. Removed from office after imposition of martial law.	Seats eliminated							
District dissolved into the sixteen-seat Region III's at-large district for the Interim Batasang Pambansa.								Seats eliminated							
#	Term of office		Batasang Pambansa	Single seat				Seats eliminated							
#	Start	End	Batasang Pambansa	Image	Member	Party	Electoral history	Seats eliminated							
=== Zambales's at-large district for the Regular Batasang Pambansa ===								Seats eliminated							
District re-created February 1, 1984.								Seats eliminated							
–	July 23, 1984	March 25, 1986	2nd		Antonio Diaz	KBL	Elected in 1984.	Seats eliminated							
District dissolved into Zambales's 1st and 2nd districts.								Seats eliminated							

== See also ==
- Legislative districts of Zambales
