= Alberto Barretto =

Filipino lawyer and politician (1867–1951)

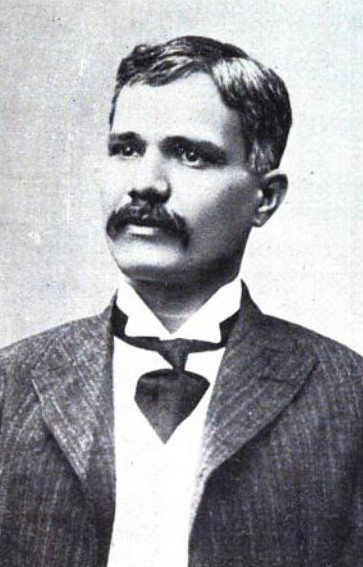
- Barretto as a member of the Philippine Assembly, 1908

Majority Floor Leader of the Philippine Assembly
- In office 1910–1911
- Speaker: Sergio Osmeña
- Preceded by: Manuel L. Quezon
- Succeeded by: Macario Adriatico

Member of the Philippine Assembly from Zambales's at-large district
- In office October 16, 1907 – July 20, 1911
- Preceded by: District reestablished (seat last held by Juan Manday Gabriel, Alejandro Albert, and Félix Bautista in the Malolos Congress)
- Succeeded by: Gabriel Alba

Member of the Malolos Congress for Masbate y Ticao's at-large district
- In office September 15, 1898 – March 23, 1901 Serving with Máximo Cabigting

Secretary of Finance
- In office January 15, 1917 – July 17, 1928
- Appointed by: Francis Burton Harrison; Charles Yeater; Leonard Wood; Eugene Allen Gilmore; Henry L. Stimson
- Preceded by: Victorino Mapa
- Succeeded by: Miguel Unson

Personal details
- Born: Alberto Blanco Barretto; November 21, 1867 Cabangan, Zambales, Captaincy General of the Philippines
- Died: December 7, 1951 (aged 84)
- Party: Nacionalista (1907–1951)
- Other political affiliations: Democrata (1902–1906); Independista (1906–1907)
- Spouse: Bonifacia Afán Delgado
- Relations: Francisco Afan Delgado (brother-in-law); Gretchen Barretto (great-grandniece); Marjorie Barretto (great-grandniece); Claudine Barretto (great-grandniece); Julia Barretto (great-great-grandniece)

Military service
- Allegiance: First Philippine Republic
- Branch/service: Philippine Republican Army
- Years of service: 1899
- Rank: Lieutenant colonel

Alberto Blanco Barretto (November 21, 1867 – December 7, 1951) was a Filipino lawyer and politician who served as a member of the Philippine House of Representatives for Zambales's at-large district from 1907 to 1911. He was previously a member of the Malolos Congress.

== Early life and education ==
Barretto was born on November 21, 1867, in Cabangan, Zambales, to Don Antonio Lorenzo Barretto and Carmen Sabina Escobar Blanco at his father's estate. He completed his secondary education at the Ateneo Municipal de Manila and obtained a law degree from the Royal University of Santo Tomas on March 18, 1893, with the grade of sobresaliente. He began practicing law later that year and established his own law firm.

== Career ==
In November 1898, Barretto accepted President Emilio Aguinaldo's appointment to the Malolos Congress as a representative of Masbate y Ticao. He became a member of the Committee to Draft the Constitution and of a special committee tasked with representing the assembly before Aguinaldo regarding objections raised by the government to the proposed charter.

In February 1899, he was appointed lieutenant colonel and war auditor of the Headquarters of Northern Luzon under the command of General Antonio Luna, serving until May of the same year. He was then appointed director of diplomacy in the Department of Foreign Affairs of the Philippine Republic and served as a Philippine representative to the Schurman Commission in Manila.

Barretto resigned his directorship in October 1899. After being denied admission to the American lines by General Douglas MacArthur, he returned to service with the Philippine forces and was stationed in Bautista, Bayambang, Pangasinan. Following the area's occupation by the United States Army, he was taken prisoner and brought to Manila, where he was held as a political prisoner from November 29 to December 19, 1899, when he was released by General Elwell Stephen Otis on his word of honor.

He pledged allegiance to the United States in 1900 in order to continue practicing law. In 1902, he attempted to establish the Partido Democrata.

On April 8, 1903, Governor-General William Howard Taft offered Barretto the positions of judge of the Second Judicial District and registrar of property titles of the City of Manila, allowing him to choose either post. He accepted the latter, which enabled him to continue practicing law, and served until February 8, 1905, when he resigned after Secretary of Finance and Justice Henry Clay Ide denied his request for an extension of leave.

In July 1906, Barretto was elected general secretary of the Partido Independista. He was later elected party president in February 1907, serving until April 26, when the Unión Nacional and other political groups merged to form the Nacionalista Party.

He was elected to the Philippine Assembly in 1907 as an at-large representative for Zambales and served during the 1st and 2nd Philippine Legislatures. He resigned on July 20, 1911, after being appointed judge of the Court of First Instance, and was succeeded by Gabriel Alba.

He later served as secretary of finance from 1917 to 1928.

Barretto died on December 7, 1951, at the age of 84.

== Personal life ==
Barretto was married to Bonifacia Afán Delgado. One of their daughters, Manolita, was crowned Queen of the Manila Carnival in 1916.

House of Representatives of the Philippines
Preceded by Manuel L. Quezon	Assembly Majority Leader; 1910–1911	Succeeded by Macario Adriatico
Preceded by District reestablished (seat last held by Juan Manday Gabriel, Alejandro Albert, and Félix Bautista in the Malolos Congress)	Member of the Philippine Assembly from Zambales's at-large district June 30, 1987 – June 30, 1992	Succeeded by Gabriel Alba
New district	Member of the Malolos Congress for Masbate y Ticao's at-large district June 30, 1984 – March 25, 1986; With: Máximo Cabigting	District abolished
Political offices
Preceded by Victorino Mapa	Secretary of Finance; January 15, 1917 – July 17, 1928	Succeeded by Miguel Unson
