= 1951 Philippine Senate election =

12th Philippine senatorial election

- November 13, 1951

8 (of the 24) seats in the Senate, 1 special election for a mid-term vacancy 13 seats needed for a majority
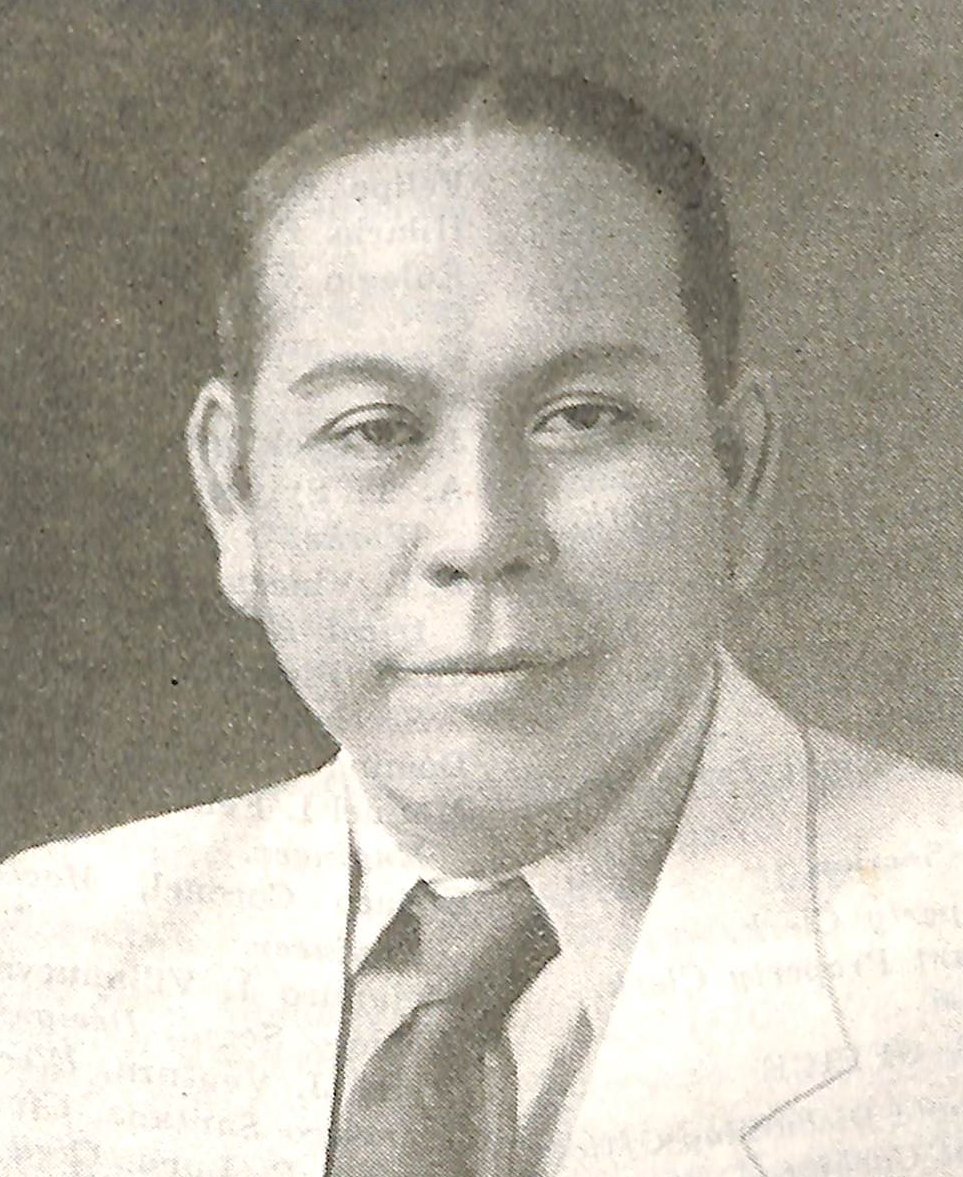

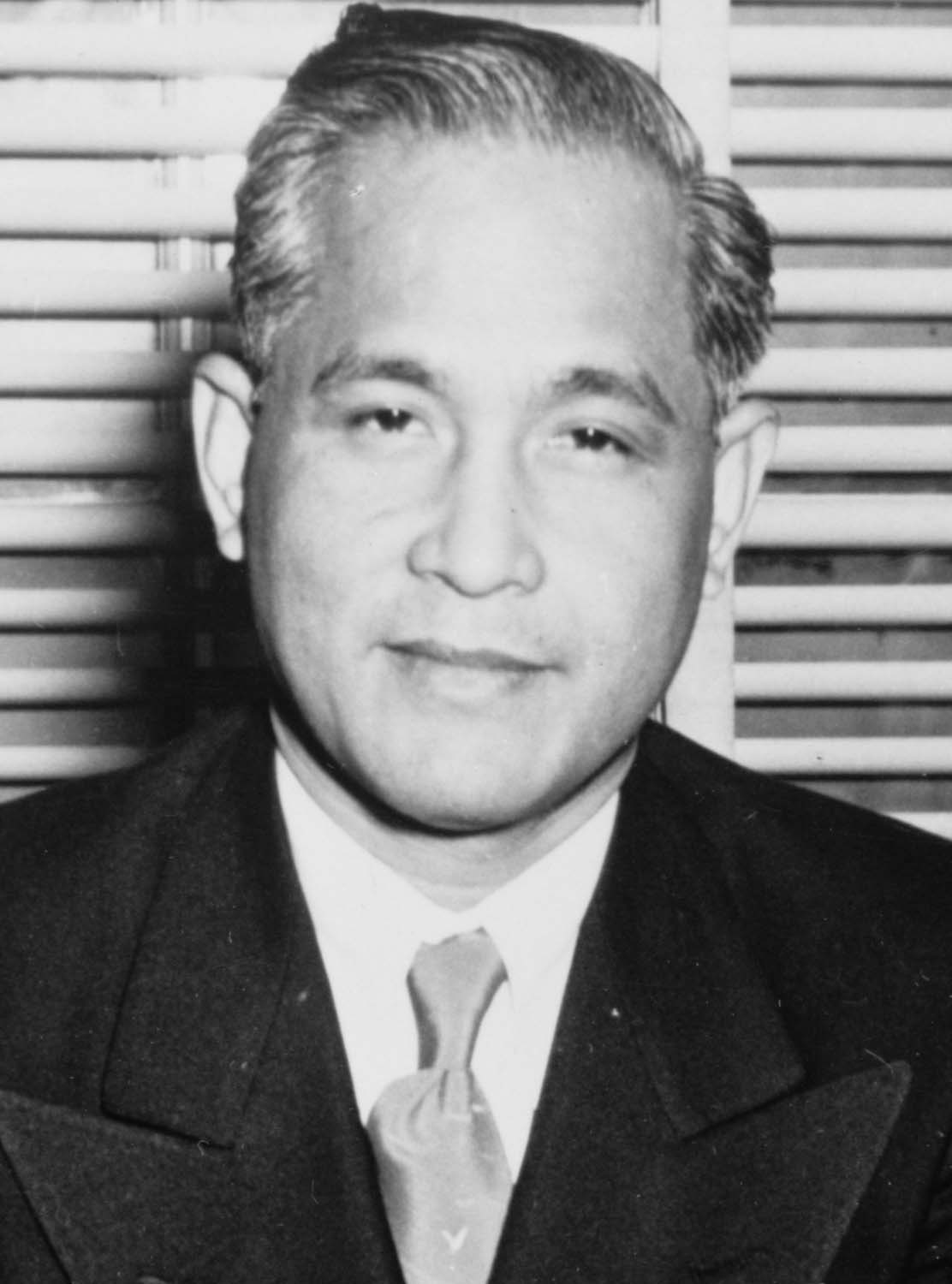
	First party	Second party
Leader	Mariano Jesús Cuenco (lost)	Carlos P. Garcia
Party	Liberal	Nacionalista
Seats before	18 (5 up)	3 (1 up)
Seats won	0	9
Seats after	13	11
Seat change	▼5	▲8
Popular vote	9,280,247	14,140,100
Percentage	38.19	58.20
Swing	▲1.62	▲5.68
Senate President before election
Mariano Jesús Cuenco
Liberal
Elected Senate President
Quintin Paredes
Liberal

The 12th election of members to the Senate of the Philippines was held on November 13, 1951. This election was known as a midterm election, and the date when elected candidates took office fells halfway through President Elpidio Quirino's four-year term.

== Electoral system ==
Philippine Senate elections are held via plurality block voting with staggered elections, with the country as an at-large district. The Senate has 24 seats, of which 8 seats are up every 2 years. The eight seats up were won by the 1st to 8th placed candidates in 1946; each voter has eight votes and can vote up to eight names, of which the eight candidates with the most votes winning the election.

The election of then senator Fernando Lopez as vice president in 1949 meant that his seat was vacated mid-term. A special election was then held for that seat under first-past-the-post system, for the rest of Lopez's term. This meant there were nine seats up for this election.

Block voting, established in 1941, was abolished in 1951 with Republic Act No. 599. This would later lead to more fragmented results in most national elections.

== Summary ==
As the Hukbalahap rebellion raged in Central Luzon, Filipinos trooped to the polling booths for the 1951 midterm elections—a referendum on President Quirino, who had won the presidency in his own right two years prior. Despite the political remarriage of the two factions of the Liberal Party, the Quirinistas and Avelinistas, the Quirino administration was still far from popular. It had gained notoriety for its inability to rein in corruption and its ineffectual attempts to police lawlessness in the countryside. The Nacionalistas took advantage of the situation and mounted an active campaign to wrest back the Senate from the LP. Led by former President Jose P. Laurel, Quirino’s chief adversary in the 1949 presidential polls, the NP swept all eight Senate seats in contention, the first total victory of the opposition in the Senate. So strong was the rejection of the Quirino administration in 1951 that even LP top honcho, Senate President Mariano Jesus Cuenco, lost his seat. Laurel received the highest number of votes, which was seen as his political rehabilitation and which made him the first and only president, thus far, to have served in the Senate after his presidency.

Felixberto Verano, also a Nacionalista, won the special elections held on the same day to fill the Senate seat vacated by Vice-President Fernando Lopez.

== Retiring incumbents ==
1. Melecio Arranz (Liberal)
2. Jose Avelino (Liberal)
3. Vicente Francisco (Liberal)
4. Ramon Torres (Liberal)

=== Mid-term vacancies ===
1. Fernando Lopez (Liberal), elected vice president, left office on December 30, 1949)
2. Vicente Sotto (Popular Front), died July 16, 1950)
3. Tomas Confesor (Nacionalista), died June 5, 1951)

== Results ==
The Nacionalista Party won all eight seats contested in the general election, and the seat contested in the special election.

Senate President Mariano Jesús Cuenco was the sole incumbent defeated, while Carlos P. Garcia successfully defended his seat.

Six winners are neophyte Nacionalista senators: Manuel Briones, Francisco Afan Delgado, Jose Locsin, Cipriano Primicias Sr., Gil Puyat and Jose Zulueta.

Nacionalista Jose P. Laurel returned to the Senate after serving from 1925 to 1931.

	1	2	3	4	5	6	7	8	9	10	11	12	13	14	15	16	17	18	19	20	21	22	23	24
Before election														‡	‡	‡	‡	‡	‡^	‡^	‡^	‡		
Election result	Not up													NP									Not up	
After election														+	+	+	+	+	+	+	+	√		

Key:

- ‡ Seats up
- + Gained by a party from another party
- √ Held by the incumbent
- * Held by the same party with a new senator
- ^ Vacancy

=== Per candidate ===
Candidate	Party	Votes	%
Jose P. Laurel	Nacionalista Party	2,143,452	48.81
Gil Puyat	Nacionalista Party	1,906,402	43.42
Manuel Briones	Nacionalista Party	1,774,687	40.42
Carlos P. Garcia	Nacionalista Party	1,573,095	35.82
Francisco Afan Delgado	Nacionalista Party	1,534,176	34.94
Cipriano Primicias Sr.	Nacionalista Party	1,487,159	33.87
Jose Locsin	Nacionalista Party	1,452,577	33.08
Jose Zulueta	Nacionalista Party	1,395,095	31.77
Jose P. Bengzon	Liberal Party	1,277,925	29.10
Pio Pedrosa	Liberal Party	1,232,791	28.07
Teodoro Evangelista	Liberal Party	1,210,815	27.57
Mariano Jesús Cuenco	Liberal Party	1,205,897	27.46
Antonio Quirino	Liberal Party	1,041,539	23.72
Primitivo Lovina	Liberal Party	982,601	22.38
Juan V. Borra	Liberal Party	869,160	19.79
Raul Leuterio	Liberal Party	850,216	19.36
Josefina Phodaca	National Political Party of Women	431,328	9.82
Jose T. Nueno	Independent	93,246	2.12
Leonardo Tenebro	Independent	2,132	0.05
Cesar Bulacan	Independent	1,371	0.03
Total		22,465,664	100.00
Total votes		4,391,109	–
Registered voters/turnout		4,754,109	92.36

=== Special election ===
To serve the unexpired term of Fernando Lopez until December 30, 1953.

Candidate	Party	Votes	%
Felixberto Verano	Nacionalista Party	873,457	47.69
Cornelio Villareal	Liberal Party	609,303	33.27
Prospero Sanidad	Liberal Party (Independent)	223,810	12.22
Carlos Tan	Liberal Party (Independent)	124,975	6.82
Total		1,831,545	100.00
Valid votes		1,831,545	41.71
Invalid/blank votes		2,559,564	58.29
Total votes		4,391,109	–
Registered voters/turnout		4,754,307	92.36

=== Per party ===
The seat vacated by Vicente Yap Sotto (Popular Front), who died in 1950, was one of the seats up for election. This also includes the result of the concurrent special election for the seat vacated by Vice President Fernando Lopez in 1949.

Party	Votes	%	+/–	Seats				
Party	Votes	%	+/–	Up	Before	Won	After	+/−
Nacionalista Party	14,140,100	58.20	+5.68	1	3	9	11	+8
Liberal Party	9,280,247	38.19	+1.62	5	18	0	13	−5
National Political Party of Women	431,328	1.78	New	0	0	0	0	0
Liberal Party (independent)	348,785	1.44	New	0	0	0	0	0
Independent	96,749	0.40	+0.38	0	0	0	0	0
Vacancy				3	3	0	0	−3
Total	24,297,209	100.00	–	9	24	9	24	0
Total votes	4,391,109	–						
Registered voters/turnout	4,754,307	92.36						

Vote share
NP	58.20%
LP	38.19%
Others	3.62%

Senate seats
NP	100.0%
LP	0.0%
Others	0.0%

== Defeated incumbents ==
1. Mariano Jesús Cuenco (Liberal) ran and won in 1953

== See also ==
- Also held on this day:
  - 1951 Philippine House of Representatives special elections (Rizal's 2nd district, Occidental Mindoro's at-large district, and Zambales's at-large district)
  - 1951 Philippine local elections
- Commission on Elections
- 2nd Congress of the Philippines
