= 2nd Philippine Legislature =

4th legislative term of the Philippines

←	1st	3rd	→
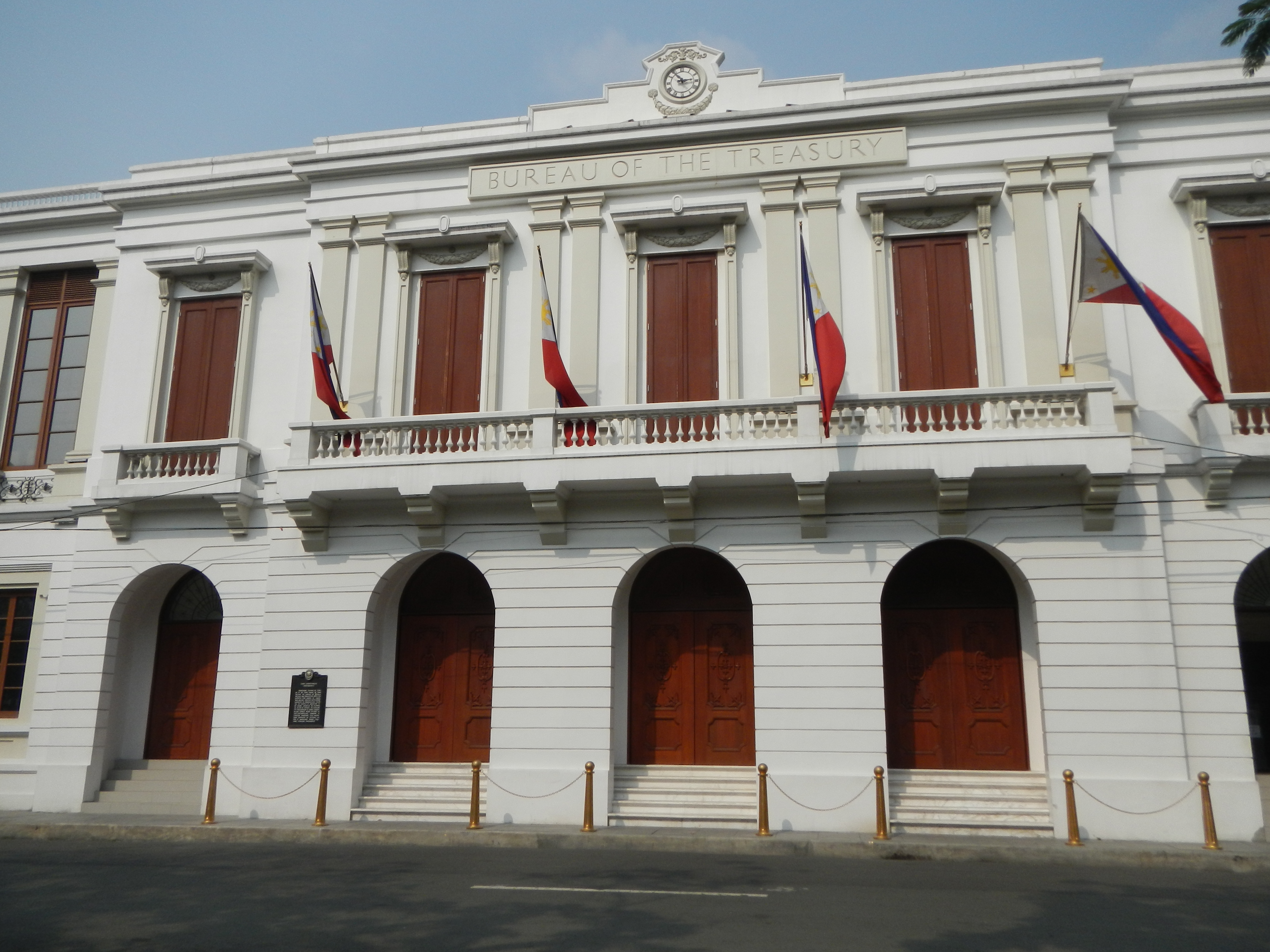
- Ayuntamiento de Manila (2014)

Overview
- Term: March 28, 1910 – February 6, 1912
- Governor-General: William Cameron Forbes

Philippine Commission
- Members: 9
- President: William Cameron Forbes

Philippine Assembly
- Members: 81
- Speaker: Sergio Osmeña
- Majority leader: Alberto Barretto (until July 20, 1911)

The 2nd Philippine Legislature was the meeting of the legislature of the Philippines under the sovereign control of the United States from March 28, 1910, to February 6, 1912.

== Sessions ==
- First Special Session: March 28 – April 19, 1910
- First Regular Session: October 17, 1910 – February 3, 1911
- Second Regular Session: October 16, 1911 – February 1, 1912
- Second Special Session: February 2 – 6, 1912

== Legislation ==
The Second Philippine Legislature passed a total of 221 laws (Act Nos. 1971–2191).

== Party summary ==
Assembly membership

Beginning of the Legislature

End of the Legislature

=== Philippine Assembly ===
	Party (shading shows control)				Total	Vacant
	Nacionalista	Progresista	Liga Popular	Independent	Total	Vacant
End of previous legislature	55	15	1	5	76	4
Begin	56	18	2	5	81	0
End	55	20	1	5	81	0
Final voting share	67.9%	24.7%	1.2%	6.2%		
Beginning of next legislature	58	17	1	5	81	0

== Leadership ==
=== Philippine Commission ===
President of the Commission

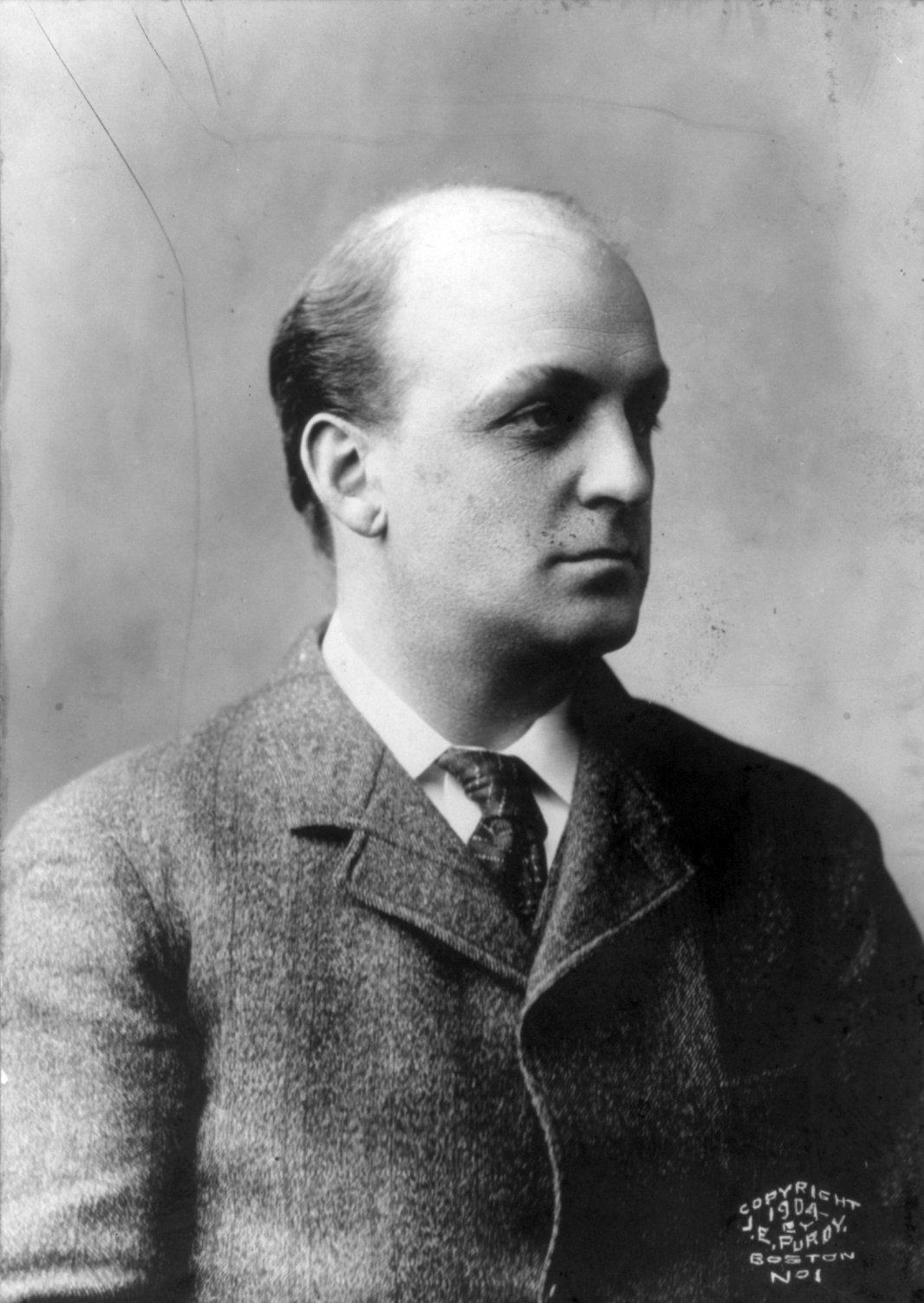
William Cameron Forbes

- Governor-General and President of the Philippine Commission: William Cameron Forbes

=== Philippine Assembly ===
Speaker of the Assembly

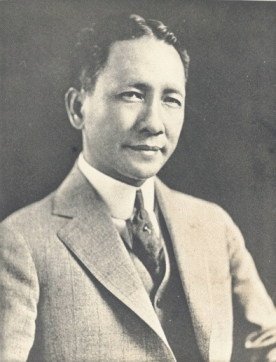
Sergio Osmeña

- Speaker: Sergio Osmeña (Cebu–2nd, Nacionalista)
- Majority Floor Leader: Alberto Barretto (Zambales, Nacionalista), until July 20, 1911

== Members ==
=== Philippine Commission ===
- Gregorio S. Araneta
- Frank A. Branagan
- Charles B. Elliott (Note: Charles B. Elliott took office as commissioner and concurrent Secretary of Commerce and Police on February 15, 1910, to succeed William Cameron Forbes, who took office as Governor-General of the Philippines on November 11, 1909.)
- William Cameron Forbes
- Newton W. Gilbert
- Jose de Luzuriaga
- Rafael Palma
- Juan Sumulong
- Dean Conant Worcester

Sources:

- Colby, Frank Moore (1911). The New International Yearbook: A Compendium of the World's Progress for the Year 1910. New York: Dodd, Mead and Company.
- Journal of the Philippine Commission Being the Second Session of the First Philippine Legislature. Manila: Bureau of Printing. 1910.
- Journal of the Philippine Commission Being A Special Session, March 28, 1910, to April 19, 1910, and the First Session, October 17, 1910, to February 3, 1911, of the Second Philippine Legislature. Manila: Bureau of Printing. 1911.
- Journal of the Philippine Commission Being the Second Session, October 16, 1911, to February 1, 1912, and A Special Session, February 2, 1912, to February 6, 1912, of the Second Philippine Legislature. Manila: Bureau of Printing. 1912.

=== Philippine Assembly ===
Province/City	District	Member	Party
Albay	1st	Marcial Calleja	Progresista
Albay	2nd	Silvino Brimbuela	Progresista
Albay	3rd	Felix Samson	Nacionalista
Ambos Camarines	1st	Tomas Arejola	Nacionalista
Ambos Camarines	2nd	Fulgencio Contreras	Progresista
Ambos Camarines	3rd	Jose Fuentebella	Nacionalista
Antique	Lone	Angel Salazar	Progresista
Bataan	Lone	Tomas del Rosario	Progresista
Batanes	Lone	Teofilo Castillejos (Note: Teofilo Castillejos died on July 22, 1910.)	Nacionalista
Batanes	Lone	Vicente Barsana (Note: Vicente Barsana was elected on January 4, 1911, to succeed Teofilo Castillejos.)	Progresista
Batangas	1st	Galicano Apacible	Nacionalista
Batangas	2nd	Florencio R. Caedo	Progresista
Batangas	3rd	Teodoro Kalaw	Nacionalista
Bohol	1st	Candelario Borja	Nacionalista
Bohol	2nd	Jose Clarin	Nacionalista
Bohol	3rd	Eutiquio Boyles	Independent
Bulacan	1st	Hermogenes Reyes	Nacionalista
Bulacan	2nd	Mariano Ponce	Nacionalista
Cagayan	1st	Venancio Concepcion	Nacionalista
Cagayan	2nd	Leoncio Fonacier	Nacionalista
Capiz	1st	Rafael Acuña	Nacionalista
Capiz	2nd	Leocadio Pajarillo	Independent
Capiz	3rd	Braulio C. Manican	Nacionalista
Cavite	Lone	Emiliano Tria Tirona	Independent
Cebu	1st	Celestino Rodriguez	Nacionalista
Cebu	2nd	Sergio Osmeña	Nacionalista
Cebu	3rd	Filemon Sotto	Nacionalista
Cebu	4th	Alejandro Ruiz	Nacionalista
Cebu	5th	Troadio Galicano	Nacionalista
Cebu	6th	Vicente Lozada	Nacionalista
Cebu	7th	Eulalio E. Causing	Nacionalista
Ilocos Norte	1st	Ireneo Javier	Nacionalista
Ilocos Norte	2nd	Lucas Paredes	Nacionalista
Ilocos Sur	1st	Vicente Singson Encarnacion	Progresista
Ilocos Sur	2nd	Jose Maria de Valle	Progresista
Ilocos Sur	3rd	Juan Villamor	Nacionalista
Iloilo	1st	Francisco Felipe Villanueva	Progresista
Iloilo	2nd	Carlos Ledesma	Progresista
Iloilo	3rd	Jose Lopez Vito	Progresista
Iloilo	4th	Espiridion Guanco	Nacionalista
Iloilo	5th	Ramon Lopez	Progresista
Isabela	Lone	Eliseo Claravall	Progresista
La Laguna	1st	Potenciano Malvar (Note: Potenciano Malvar was appointed as Governor of La Laguna on October 1, 1910.)	Nacionalista
La Laguna	1st	Marcos Paulino (Note: Marcos Paulino was elected on December 13, 1910, to succeed Potenciano Malvar.)	Progresista
La Laguna	2nd	Pedro Guevara	Nacionalista
La Union	1st	Joaquin Luna	Nacionalista
La Union	2nd	Anacleto Diaz	Nacionalista
Leyte	1st	Estanislao Granados	Nacionalista
Leyte	2nd	Francisco Zialcita	Liga Popular
Leyte	3rd	Abdon Marchadesch	Independent
Leyte	4th	Jaime C. de Veyra	Nacionalista
Manila	1st	Justo Lukban (Note: Justo Lukban was removed on January 26, 1911, after an electoral protest.)	Liga Popular
Manila	1st	Dominador Gomez (Note: Dominador Gomez replaced Justo Lukban on January 26, 1911, after winning an electoral protest.)	Nacionalista
Manila	2nd	Pablo Ocampo	Nacionalista
Mindoro	Lone	Macario Adriatico	Nacionalista
Misamis	1st	Leon Borromeo	Nacionalista
Misamis	2nd	Nicolas Capistrano	Nacionalista
Negros Occidental	1st	Jose Lopez Villanueva	Nacionalista
Negros Occidental	2nd	Manuel Fernandez Yanson	Progresista
Negros Occidental	3rd	Rafael Ramos	Nacionalista
Negros Oriental	1st	Hermenegildo Villanueva	Progresista
Negros Oriental	2nd	Teofisto Guingona Sr.	Progresista
Nueva Ecija	Lone	Isauro Gabaldon	Nacionalista
Palawan	Lone	Manuel Sandoval	Nacionalista
Pampanga	1st	Monico R. Mercado	Nacionalista
Pampanga	2nd	Jacobo Fajardo	Nacionalista
Pangasinan	1st	Cirilo Braganza	Nacionalista
Pangasinan	2nd	Mariano Padilla	Nacionalista
Pangasinan	3rd	Jose T. Pecson	Nacionalista
Pangasinan	4th	Joaquin Balmori	Progresista
Pangasinan	5th	Domingo Patajo	Independent
Rizal	1st	Jose Lino Luna	Nacionalista
Rizal	2nd	Jose Tupas	Progresista
Samar	1st	Vicente M. Obieta	Nacionalista
Samar	2nd	Benito Azanza	Nacionalista
Samar	3rd	Eladio Cinco	Nacionalista
Sorsogon	1st	Leoncio Grajo	Nacionalista
Sorsogon	2nd	Jose Zurbito	Nacionalista
Surigao	Lone	Manuel G. Gavieres (Note: Manuel G. Gavieres died on May 31, 1910.)	Nacionalista
Surigao	Lone	Inocencio Cortes (Note: Inocencio Cortes was elected on October 14, 1910, to succeed Manuel G. Gavieres.)	Nacionalista
Tarlac	1st	Mauricio Ilagan	Nacionalista
Tarlac	2nd	Marciano Barrera	Nacionalista
Tayabas	1st	Filemon Perez	Nacionalista
Tayabas	2nd	Gregorio Nieva	Nacionalista
Zambales	Lone	Alberto Barretto (Note: Alberto Barretto was appointed as judge of the Court of First Instance for the Fifth Judicial District on July 20, 1911.)	Nacionalista
Zambales	Lone	Gabriel Alba (Note: Gabriel Alba was elected on October 3, 1911, to succeed Alberto Barretto.)	Nacionalista

Source: Philippine Assembly (1908). Official Directory of the First Philippine Legislature. Manila: Bureau of Printing.

== Changes in membership ==
=== Philippine Assembly ===
District	Incumbent				Special election	Successor		
District	Member	Party	Date	Reason	Special election	Member	Party	Date
Surigao–Lone	Manuel G. Gavieres	Nacionalista	May 31, 1910	Died in office	October 14, 1910	Inocencio Cortes	Nacionalista	October 14, 1910
Batanes–Lone	Teofilo Castillejos	Nacionalista	July 22, 1910	Died in office	January 4, 1911	Vicente Barsana	Progresista	January 4, 1911
Laguna–1st	Potenciano Malvar	Nacionalista	October 1, 1910	Appointed Governor of La Laguna	December 13, 1910	Marcos Paulino	Progresista	December 13, 1910
Manila–1st	Justo Lukban	Liga Popular	January 26, 1911	Removed on after an electoral protest		Dominador Gomez	Nacionalista	January 26, 1911
Zambales–Lone	Alberto Barretto	Nacionalista	July 20, 1911	Appointed judge of the Court of First Instance for the Fifth Judicial District	October 3, 1911	Gabriel Alba	Nacionalista	October 3, 1911

== See also ==
- Congress of the Philippines
- Senate of the Philippines
- House of Representatives of the Philippines
