= 1st Philippine Legislature =

3rd legislative term of the Philippines

←	2nd Philippine Commission (unicameral)	2nd Legislature	→
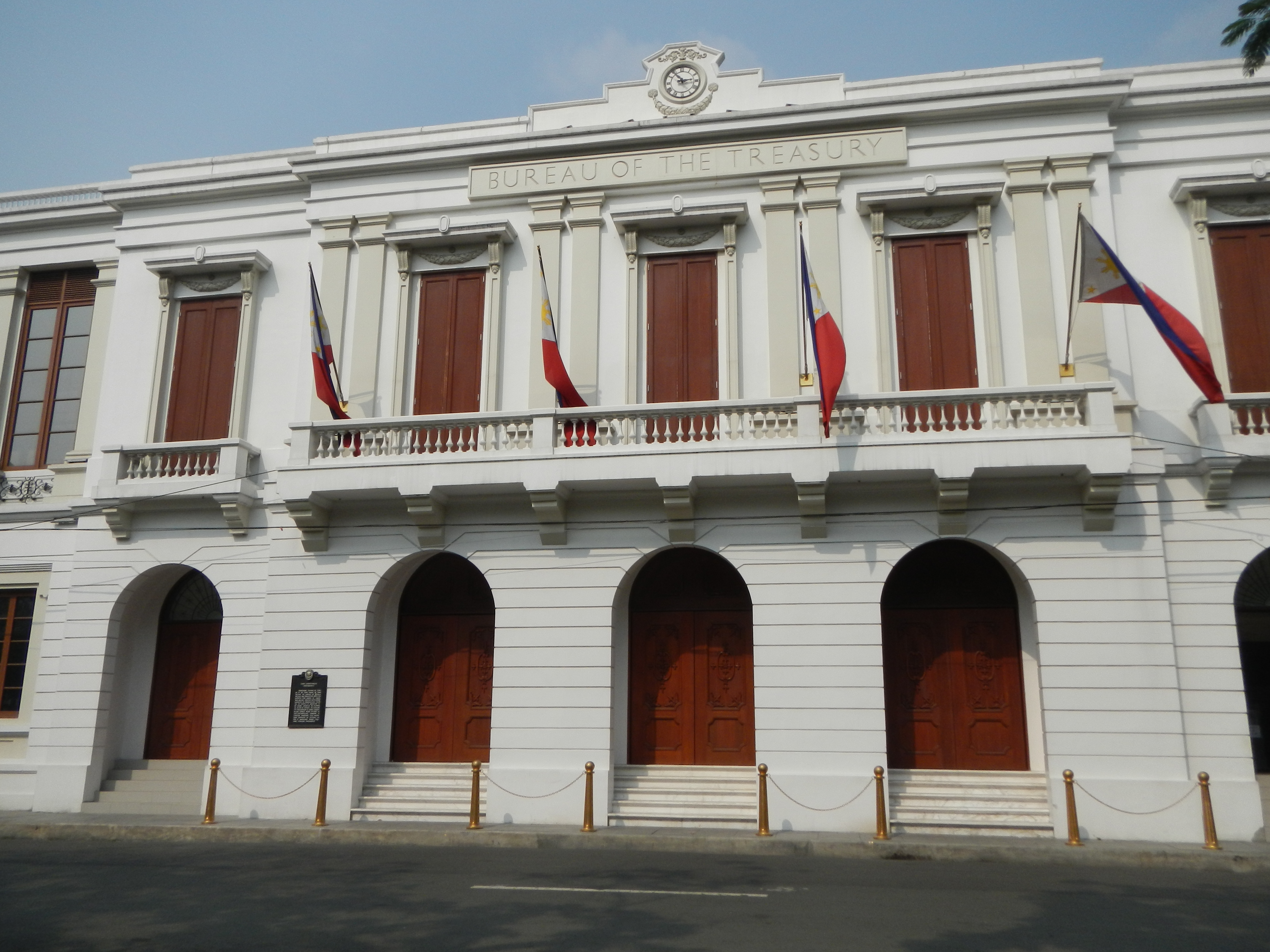
- Ayuntamiento de Manila (2014)

Overview
- Term: October 16, 1907 – May 20, 1909
- Governor-General: James Francis Smith (until November 11, 1909); William Cameron Forbes (from November 11, 1909)

Philippine Commission
- Members: 9
- President: James Francis Smith (until November 11, 1909); William Cameron Forbes (from November 11, 1909)

Philippine Assembly
- Members: 80
- Speaker: Sergio Osmeña
- Majority leader: Manuel L. Quezon
- Minority leader: Vicente Singson Encarnacion

The 1st Philippine Legislature was the first session of the Philippine Legislature, the first Filipino-representative legislature of the Philippines under American foreign rule through the American-controlled Insular Government. The Philippine Legislature consisted of an appointed upper house, the Philippine Commission, and an elected lower house, the Philippine Assembly.

== Sessions ==
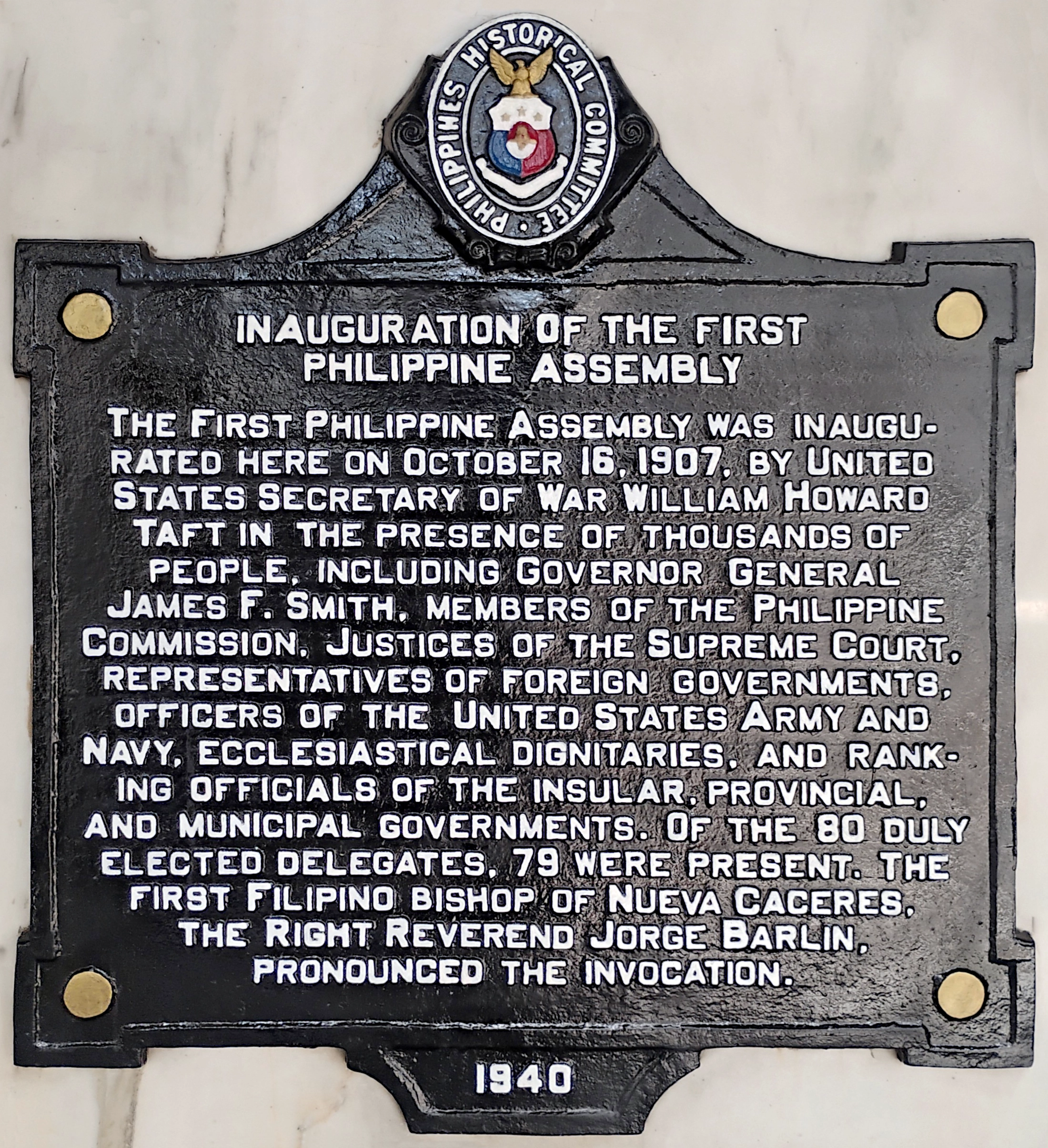
National historical marker commemorating the inauguration of the legislature at the Manila Grand Opera House

- First Regular Session: October 16, 1907 – April 4, 1908
- First Special Session: May 22 – June 19, 1908
- Second Regular Session: February 1 – May 20, 1909

== Legislation ==
The First Philippine Legislature passed a total of 170 laws (Act Nos. 1801–1970).

=== Major legislation ===
- Act No. 1801 — Gabaldon Act

== Party summary ==
Assembly membership

Beginning of the Legislature

End of the Legislature

=== Philippine Assembly ===
	Party (shading shows control)				Total	Vacant
	Nacionalista	Progresista	Liga Popular	Independent	Total	Vacant
Begin	58	17	—N/a	5	80	0
End	55	15	1	5	76	4
Final voting share	68.8%	18.8%	1.3%	6.3%		
Beginning of next legislature	56	18	2	5	81	0

== Leadership ==
=== Philippine Commission ===
President of the Commission

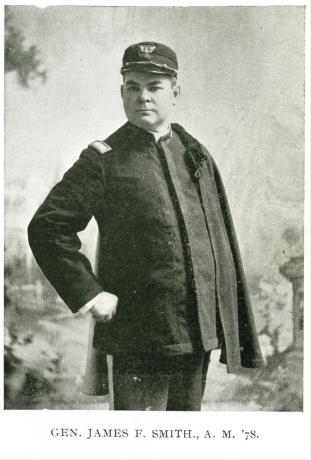
James Francis Smith,
until November 11, 1909

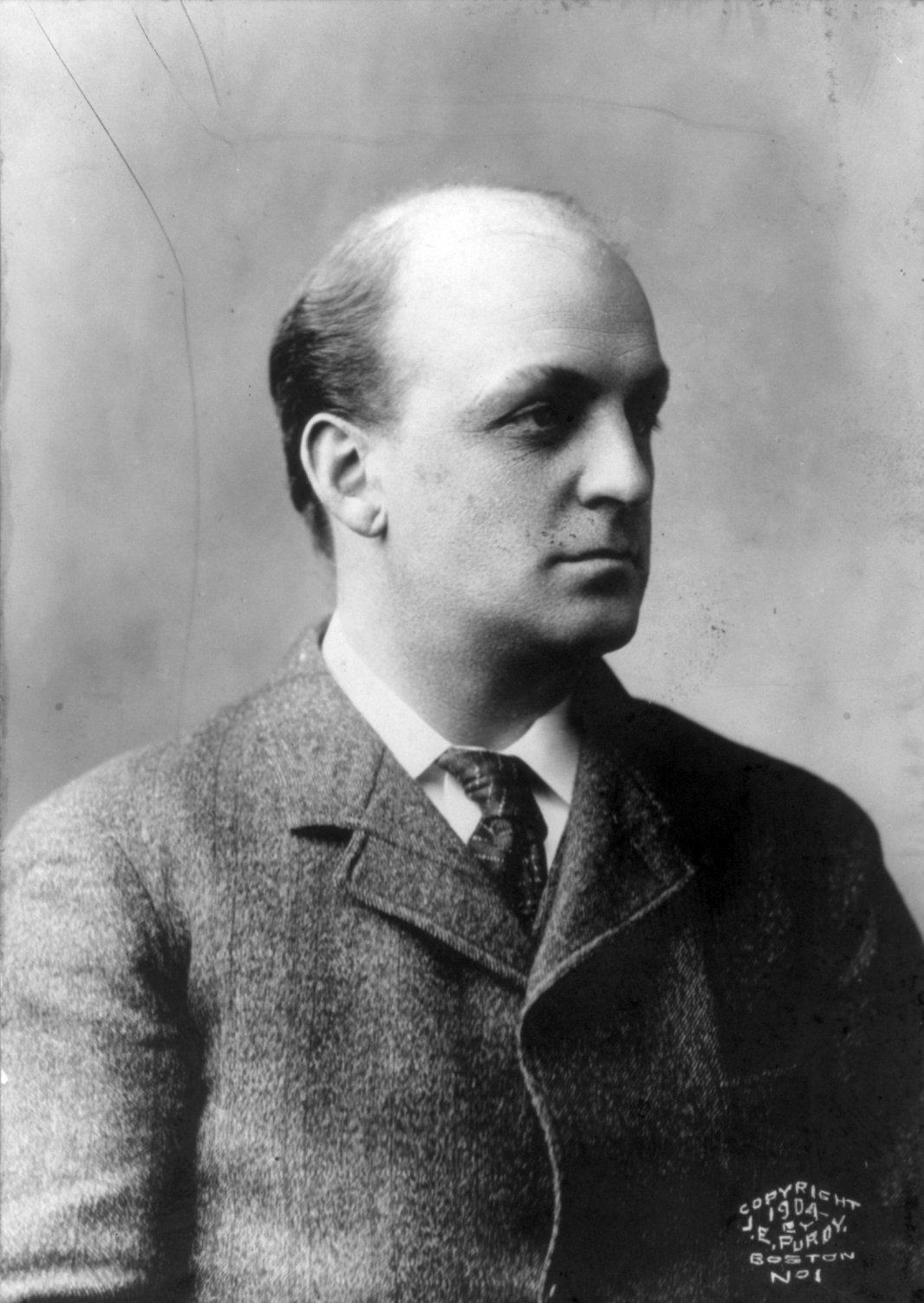
William Cameron Forbes,
from November 11, 1909

- Governor-General and President of the Philippine Commission:
  - James Francis Smith, until November 11, 1909
  - William Cameron Forbes, from November 11, 1909

=== Philippine Assembly ===
Speaker of the Assembly

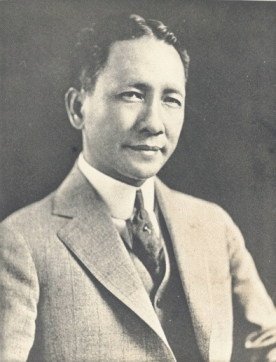
Sergio Osmeña

- Speaker: Sergio Osmeña (Cebu–2nd, Nacionalista)
- Majority Floor Leader: Manuel L. Quezon (Tayabas–1st, Nacionalista)
- Minority Floor Leader: Vicente Singson Encarnacion (Ilocos Sur–1st, Progresista)

== Members ==
=== Philippine Commission ===
- Gregorio S. Araneta (Note: Gregorio S. Araneta took office as commissioner and concurrent Secretary of Finance and Justice on July 1, 1908, to succeed Henry Clay Ide, who took office as Governor-General of the Philippines on April 2, 1906.)
- Frank A. Branagan (Note: Frank A. Branagan took office as commissioner on March 4, 1909, to succeed Newton W. Gilbert.)
- William Cameron Forbes (Note: William Cameron Forbes vacated the positions of commissioner and concurrent Secretary of Commerce and Police and took office as Governor-General of the Philippines on November 11, 1909, to succeed James Francis Smith.)
- Newton W. Gilbert (Note: Newton W. Gilbert took office as commissioner on July 1, 1908, to succeed Benito Legarda. He later concurrently took office as Secretary of Public Instruction on March 1, 1909, to succeed William Morgan Shuster.)
- Benito Legarda (Note: Benito Legarda resigned as commissioner on December 21, 1907, upon his election as Resident Commissioner of the Philippines.)
- Jose de Luzuriaga
- Rafael Palma (Note: Rafael Palma took office as commissioner on July 6, 1908, filling a new seat in the Philippine Commission that was created by the United States Congress on May 11, 1908.)
- Trinidad Pardo de Tavera (Note: Trinidad Pardo de Tavera resigned as commissioner on March 1, 1909.)
- William Morgan Shuster (Note: William Morgan Shuster resigned as commissioner and concurrent Secretary of Public Instruction on March 1, 1909.)
- James Francis Smith (Note: James Francis Smith resigned as Governor-General of the Philippines on November 11, 1909.)
- Juan Sumulong (Note: Juan Sumulong took office as commissioner on March 1, 1909, to succeed Trinidad Pardo de Tavera.)
- Dean Conant Worcester

Sources:

- Journal of the Philippine Commission Being the Inaugural Session of the First Philippine Legislature. Manila: Bureau of Printing. 1908.
- Journal of the Philippine Commission Being the First Session and a Special Session of the First Philippine Legislature. Manila: Bureau of Printing. 1908.
- Journal of the Philippine Commission Being the Second Session of the First Philippine Legislature. Manila: Bureau of Printing. 1910.

=== Philippine Assembly ===
Province/City	District	Member	Party
Albay	1st	Tomas Almonte	Nacionalista
Albay	2nd	Carlos A. Imperial	Progresista
Albay	3rd	Angel Roco	Progresista
Ambos Camarines	1st	Tomas Arejola	Nacionalista
Ambos Camarines	2nd	Manuel Rey	Nacionalista
Ambos Camarines	3rd	Francisco Alvarez	Nacionalista
Antique	Lone	Pedro V. Jimenez	Progresista
Bataan	Lone	Jose Maria Lerma	Nacionalista
Batangas	1st	Felipe Agoncillo	Independent
Batangas	2nd	Eusebio Orense	Nacionalista
Batangas	3rd	Gregorio Katigbak	Nacionalista
Bohol	1st	Candelario Borja	Nacionalista
Bohol	2nd	Jose Clarin	Nacionalista
Bohol	3rd	Eutaquio Boyles	Nacionalista
Bulacan	1st	Aguedo Velarde	Nacionalista
Bulacan	2nd	Leon Maria Guerrero	Nacionalista
Cagayan	1st	Pablo Guzman	Progresista
Cagayan	2nd	Gabriel Lasam	Progresista
Capiz	1st	Eugenio Picazo	Nacionalista
Capiz	2nd	Jose Altavas	Nacionalista
Capiz	3rd	Simeon Mobo	Nacionalista
Cavite	Lone	Rafael Palma (Note: Rafael Palma was appointed to the Philippine Commission on June 30, 1908.)	Nacionalista
Cavite	Lone	Emiliano Tria Tirona (Note: Emiliano Tria Tirona was elected on January 19, 1909, to succeed Rafael Palma.)	Nacionalista
Cebu	1st	Celestino Rodriguez	Nacionalista
Cebu	2nd	Sergio Osmeña	Nacionalista
Cebu	3rd	Filemon Sotto	Nacionalista
Cebu	4th	Alejandro Ruiz	Nacionalista
Cebu	5th	Troadio Galicano	Nacionalista
Cebu	6th	Casiano Causing	Nacionalista
Cebu	7th	Pedro Rodriguez	Nacionalista
Ilocos Norte	1st	Ireneo Javier	Nacionalista
Ilocos Norte	2nd	Baldomero Pobre	Nacionalista
Ilocos Sur	1st	Vicente Singson Encarnacion	Progresista
Ilocos Sur	2nd	Maximino Mina	Nacionalista
Ilocos Sur	3rd	Juan Villamor	Nacionalista
Iloilo	1st	Amando Avanceña	Nacionalista
Iloilo	2nd	Nicolas Jalandoni	Nacionalista
Iloilo	3rd	Salvador Laguda	Progresista
Iloilo	4th	Adriano Hernandez	Nacionalista
Iloilo	5th	Regino Dorillo	Progresista
Isabela	Lone	Nicasio Claravall (Note: Nicasio Claravall was removed on January 20, 1908, after an electoral protest.)	Progresista
Isabela	Lone	Dimas Guzman (Note: Dimas Guzman replaced Nicasio Claravall on January 20, 1908, after winning an electoral protest. He later died on March 18, 1909.)	Nacionalista
La Laguna	1st	Pedro Paterno	Nacionalista
La Laguna	2nd	Crispin Oben	Nacionalista
La Union	1st	Andres Asprer	Nacionalista
La Union	2nd	Francisco Zandueta	Progresista
Leyte	1st	Quiremon Alkuino	Nacionalista
Leyte	2nd	Salvador K. Demeterio	Nacionalista
Leyte	3rd	Florentino Peñaranda	Nacionalista
Leyte	4th	Jaime C. de Veyra	Nacionalista
Manila	1st	Dominador Gomez (Note: Dominador Gomez was expelled on February 1, 1908. He was elected again on March 30, 1908, but later resigned on June 18, 1908.)	Nacionalista
Manila	1st	Justo Lukban (Note: Justo Lukban was elected on August 11, 1908, to succeed Dominador Gomez.)	Liga Popular
Manila	2nd	Fernando Maria Guerrero	Nacionalista
Mindoro	Lone	Macario Adriatico	Nacionalista
Misamis	1st	Carlos Corrales	Independent
Misamis	2nd	Manuel Corrales	Independent
Negros Occidental	1st	Antonio Ledesma Jayme	Nacionalista
Negros Occidental	2nd	Dionisio Mapa	Nacionalista
Negros Occidental	3rd	Agustin Montilla	Progresista
Negros Oriental	1st	Leopoldo Rovira	Progresista
Negros Oriental	2nd	Vicente Locsin	Progresista
Nueva Ecija	Lone	Isauro Gabaldon	Nacionalista
Palawan	Lone	Santiago M. Patero	Progresista
Pampanga	1st	Monico R. Mercado	Nacionalista
Pampanga	2nd	Marcelino Aguas	Nacionalista
Pangasinan	1st	Nicanor Padilla	Independent
Pangasinan	2nd	Deogracias Reyes (Note: Deogracias Reyes died on June 17, 1909.)	Nacionalista
Pangasinan	3rd	Juan Alvear	Nacionalista
Pangasinan	4th	Lorenzo Fenoy	Nacionalista
Pangasinan	5th	Matias Gonzales	Independent
Rizal	1st	Cayetano Lukban	Nacionalista
Rizal	2nd	Bartolome Revilla	Nacionalista
Samar	1st	Honorio Rosales	Nacionalista
Samar	2nd	Luciano Sinko	Nacionalista
Samar	3rd	Eugenio Daza	Nacionalista
Sorsogon	1st	Vicente de Vera	Nacionalista
Sorsogon	2nd	Pedro Chavez	Nacionalista
Surigao	Lone	Francisco Soriano	Progresista
Tarlac	1st	Melecio Cojuangco (Note: Melecio Cojuangco died on March 13, 1909.)	Progresista
Tarlac	2nd	Aurelio Pineda	Progresista
Tayabas	1st	Manuel L. Quezon (Note: Manuel L. Quezon was elected as Resident Commissioner of the Philippines on May 15, 1909.)	Nacionalista
Tayabas	2nd	Emiliano A. Gala	Nacionalista
Zambales	Lone	Alberto Barretto	Nacionalista

Source: Philippine Assembly (1908). Official Directory of the First Philippine Legislature. Manila: Bureau of Printing.

== Changes in membership ==
=== Philippine Assembly ===
District	Incumbent				Special election	Successor		
District	Member	Party	Date	Reason	Special election	Member	Party	Date
Isabela–Lone	Nicasio Claravall	Progresista	January 20, 1908	Removed after an electoral protest	—N/a	Dimas Guzman	Nacionalista	January 20, 1908
Manila–1st	Dominador Gomez	Nacionalista	February 1, 1908	Expelled	March 30, 1908	Dominador Gomez	Nacionalista	March 30, 1908
Manila–1st	Dominador Gomez	Nacionalista	June 18, 1908	Resigned	August 11, 1908	Justo Lukban	Liga Popular	August 11, 1908
Cavite–Lone	Rafael Palma	Nacionalista	June 30, 1908	Appointed to the Philippine Commission	January 19, 1909	Emiliano Tria Tirona	Nacionalista	January 19, 1909
Tarlac–1st	Melecio Cojuangco	Progresista	March 13, 1909	Died in office	—N/a			
Tayabas–1st	Manuel L. Quezon	Nacionalista	May 15, 1909	Elected as Resident Commissioner of the Philippines	—N/a			
Pangasinan–2nd	Deogracias Reyes	Nacionalista	June 17, 1909	Died in office	—N/a			

== See also ==
- Congress of the Philippines
- Senate of the Philippines
- House of Representatives of the Philippines
