= Manila's 1st congressional district =

Legislative district of the Philippines

- Constituency for the House of Representatives of the Philippines
- Boundary of Manila's 1st congressional district in Manila
- Location of Manila within Metro Manila
- City: Manila
- Region: Metro Manila
- Population: 441,282 (2020)
- Electorate: 267,797 (2025)
- Major settlements: West Tondo (Barangays 1–146)
- Area: 4.57 km^{2} (1.76 sq mi)

Current constituency
- Created: 1907
- Representative: Ernesto M. Dionisio Jr.
- Political party: NUP
- Congressional bloc: Majority

Manila's 1st congressional district is one of the six congressional districts of the Philippines in the city of Manila. It has been represented in the House of Representatives of the Philippines since 1916 and earlier in the Philippine Assembly from 1907 to 1916. The district consists of barangays 1 to 146 in the western part of the Manila district of Tondo, west of Dagupan Street, Estero de Vitas and Estero de Sunog Apog bordering Navotas. It used to encompass the entire district of Tondo until 1972, as well as the western districts of Binondo, Intramuros, and San Nicolas, making it also known as the North District, until 1949 due to the revision of Manila's city charter. It is currently represented in the 20th Congress by Ernesto M. Dionisio Jr. of National Unity Party (NUP).

== Representation history ==
#	Image	Member	Term of office		Legislature	Party	Electoral history	Constituent LGUs
#	Image	Member	Start	End	Legislature	Party	Electoral history	Constituent LGUs
=== Manila's 1st district for the Philippine Assembly ===
District created January 9, 1907.
1		Dominador Gómez	October 16, 1907	February 1, 1908	1st	Nacionalista	Elected in 1907. Expelled.	1907–1916; Binondo, Intramuros, San Nicolas, Tondo
1		Dominador Gómez	May 22, 1908	June 18, 1908	1st	Nacionalista	Re-elected in 1908 to finish his term. Resigned.	1907–1916; Binondo, Intramuros, San Nicolas, Tondo
2		Justo Lukban	August 11, 1908	January 26, 1911	1st	Liga Popular	Elected in 1908 to finish Gómez's term.	1907–1916; Binondo, Intramuros, San Nicolas, Tondo
2		Justo Lukban	August 11, 1908	January 26, 1911	2nd	Liga Popular	Re-elected in 1909. Re-election annulled by the Assembly due to lack of residency.	1907–1916; Binondo, Intramuros, San Nicolas, Tondo
(1)		Dominador Gómez	January 26, 1911	October 16, 1912	2nd	Nacionalista	Declared winner of 1909 elections.	1907–1916; Binondo, Intramuros, San Nicolas, Tondo
3		Isidoro De Santos	October 16, 1912	February 26, 1916	3rd	Nacionalista	Elected in 1912.	1907–1916; Binondo, Intramuros, San Nicolas, Tondo
=== Manila's 1st district for the House of Representatives of the Philippine Islands ===
4		Antonio Montenegro	October 16, 1916	July 21, 1919	4th	Demócrata	Elected in 1916.	1916–1935; Binondo, Intramuros, San Nicolas, Tondo
5		Juan Nolasco	July 21, 1919	October 27, 1922	5th	Nacionalista	Elected in 1919.	1916–1935; Binondo, Intramuros, San Nicolas, Tondo
6		Gregorio Perfecto	October 27, 1922	July 26, 1928	6th	Demócrata	Elected in 1922.	1916–1935; Binondo, Intramuros, San Nicolas, Tondo
6		Gregorio Perfecto	October 27, 1922	July 26, 1928	7th	Demócrata	Re-elected in 1925.	1916–1935; Binondo, Intramuros, San Nicolas, Tondo
7		Francisco Varona	July 26, 1928	November 25, 1935	8th	Nacionalista; Consolidado	Elected in 1928.	1916–1935; Binondo, Intramuros, San Nicolas, Tondo
7		Francisco Varona	July 26, 1928	November 25, 1935	9th	Nacionalista; Consolidado	Re-elected in 1931.	1916–1935; Binondo, Intramuros, San Nicolas, Tondo
7		Francisco Varona	July 26, 1928	November 25, 1935	10th	Nacionalista; Demócrata Pro-Independencia	Re-elected in 1934.	1916–1935; Binondo, Intramuros, San Nicolas, Tondo
#	Image	Member	Term of office		National Assembly	Party	Electoral history	Constituent LGUs
#	Image	Member	Start	End	National Assembly	Party	Electoral history	Constituent LGUs
=== Manila's 1st district for the National Assembly (Commonwealth of the Philippines) ===
(6)		Gregorio Perfecto	November 25, 1935	December 30, 1941	1st	Nacionalista; Demócrata Pro-Independencia	Elected in 1935.	1935–1941; Binondo, Intramuros, San Nicolas, Tondo
(6)		Gregorio Perfecto	November 25, 1935	December 30, 1941	2nd	Nacionalista	Re-elected in 1938.	1935–1941; Binondo, Intramuros, San Nicolas, Tondo
District dissolved into the two-seat Manila's at-large district for the National Assembly (Second Philippine Republic).
#	Image	Member	Term of office		Common wealth Congress	Party	Electoral history	Constituent LGUs
#	Image	Member	Start	End	Common wealth Congress	Party	Electoral history	Constituent LGUs
=== Manila's 1st district for the House of Representatives of the Commonwealth of the Philippines ===
District re-created May 24, 1945.
8		Engracio F. Clemeña	June 9, 1945	May 25, 1946	1st	Popular Front	Elected in 1941.	1945–1946; Binondo, Intramuros, San Nicolas, Tondo
#	Image	Member	Term of office		Congress	Party	Electoral history	Constituent LGUs
#	Image	Member	Start	End	Congress	Party	Electoral history	Constituent LGUs
=== Manila's 1st district for the House of Representatives of the Philippines ===
9		Jose T. Nueno	May 25, 1946	December 30, 1949	1st	Popular Front	Elected in 1946.	1946–1949; Binondo, Intramuros, San Nicolas, Tondo
(8)		Engracio F. Clemeña	December 30, 1949	December 30, 1953	2nd	Nacionalista	Elected in 1949.	1949–1972; Tondo
10		Ángel M. Castaño	December 30, 1953	August 22, 1957	3rd	Nacionalista	Elected in 1953. Resigned upon appointment as Secretary of Labor.	1949–1972; Tondo
11		Salvador L. Mariño	December 30, 1957	December 30, 1961	4th	Liberal	Elected in 1957.	1949–1972; Tondo
12		Fidel A. Santiago	December 30, 1961	December 30, 1969	5th	Nacionalista	Elected in 1961.	1949–1972; Tondo
12		Fidel A. Santiago	December 30, 1961	December 30, 1969	6th	Nacionalista	Re-elected in 1965.	1949–1972; Tondo
13		Francisco G. Reyes	December 30, 1969	September 23, 1972	7th	Nacionalista	Elected in 1969. Removed from office after imposition of martial law.	1949–1972; Tondo
District dissolved into the nineteen-seat Region IV's at-large district for the Interim Batasang Pambansa, followed by the six-seat Manila's at-large district for the Regular Batasang Pambansa.
District re-created February 2, 1987.
14		Martin B. Isidro	June 30, 1987	June 30, 1998	8th	Liberal	Elected in 1987.	1987–present west Tondo (Barangays 1–146)
14		Martin B. Isidro	June 30, 1987	June 30, 1998	9th	LDP	Re-elected in 1992.	1987–present west Tondo (Barangays 1–146)
14		Martin B. Isidro	June 30, 1987	June 30, 1998	10th	NPC	Re-elected in 1995.	1987–present west Tondo (Barangays 1–146)
15		Ernesto A. Nieva	June 30, 1998	June 30, 2007	11th	LAMMP	Elected in 1998.	1987–present west Tondo (Barangays 1–146)
15		Ernesto A. Nieva	June 30, 1998	June 30, 2007	12th	Lakas	Re-elected in 2001.	1987–present west Tondo (Barangays 1–146)
15		Ernesto A. Nieva	June 30, 1998	June 30, 2007	13th	Lakas	Re-elected in 2004.	1987–present west Tondo (Barangays 1–146)
16		Benjamin D.R. Asilo	June 30, 2007	June 30, 2016	14th	PDP–Laban	Elected in 2007.	1987–present west Tondo (Barangays 1–146)
16		Benjamin D.R. Asilo	June 30, 2007	June 30, 2016	15th	Liberal	Re-elected in 2010.	1987–present west Tondo (Barangays 1–146)
16		Benjamin D.R. Asilo	June 30, 2007	June 30, 2016	16th	Liberal	Re-elected in 2013.	1987–present west Tondo (Barangays 1–146)
17		Manny Lopez	June 30, 2016	June 30, 2022	17th	NPC	Elected in 2016.	1987–present west Tondo (Barangays 1–146)
17		Manny Lopez	June 30, 2016	June 30, 2022	18th	PDP–Laban	Re-elected in 2019.	1987–present west Tondo (Barangays 1–146)
18		Ernix Dionisio	June 30, 2022	Incumbent	19th	Lakas (Asenso)	Elected in 2022.	1987–present west Tondo (Barangays 1–146)
18		Ernix Dionisio	June 30, 2022	Incumbent	20th	NUP	Re-elected in 2025.	1987–present west Tondo (Barangays 1–146)

== Election results ==
=== 2025 ===
Candidate	Party	Votes	%
Ernix Dionisio (incumbent)	Lakas–CMD	109,838	51.15
Joseph Lumbad	Filipino Rights Protection Advocates of Manila Movement	87,183	40.60
Manny Lopez	Asenso Manileño	16,334	7.61
Edwin Santos	Independent	1,385	0.64
Total		214,740	100.00
Lakas–CMD hold			

=== 2022 ===
2022 Philippine House of Representatives election in the 1st District of Manila
Party	Candidate	Votes	%
Asenso	Ernesto "Ernix" Dionisio Jr.	88,327	44.66
PDP–Laban	Manny Lopez (incumbent)	74,991	37.92
Liberal	Benjamin "Atong" Asilo	34,441	17.42
Total votes		197,759	100.00
Asenso gain from PDP–Laban			

=== 2019 ===
2019 Philippine House of Representatives elections
Party	Candidate	Votes	%
NPC	Manuel Luis "Manny" Lopez (incumbent)	86,993	54.27
PMP	Benjamin "Atong" Asilo	73,306	45.73
Invalid or blank votes			
Total votes		160,299	100.00
NPC hold			

=== 2016 ===
2016 Philippine House of Representatives elections
Party	Candidate	Votes	%
NPC	Manny Lopez	55,627	35.3
Liberal	Roberto Asilo	43,640	27.7
Asenso	Ernesto Dionisio, Jr.	42,878	27.3
Independent	Erick Ian Nieva	15,267	9.7
Invalid or blank votes		16,228	
Total votes		173,640	
NPC gain from Liberal			

=== 2013 ===
2013 Philippine House of Representatives elections
Party	Candidate	Votes	%
Liberal	Benjamin Asilo	82,579	63.61
UNA	Ernesto Dionisio, Sr.	44,420	34.22
Independent	Fernando Diaz	2,243	1.73
Independent	Ricardo Bacolod	573	0.44
Total votes		129,815	100.00
Liberal hold			

=== 2010 ===
2010 Philippine House of Representatives elections
Party	Candidate	Votes	%
KKK	Benjamin Asilo	82,249	58.27
Lakas–Kampi	Mina Nieva	40,880	28.96
Nacionalista	Arlene Koa	14.090	9.98
KBL	Fernando Diaz	3,500	2.48
Independent	Ranilo Dacay	441	0.31
Valid ballots		141,160	93.92
Invalid or blank votes		9,135	6.08
Total votes		150,295	100.00
KKK hold			

=== August 1908 special ===
1908 Philippine Assembly special election at Manila's 1st legislative district
Party	Candidate	Votes	%	±%
Liga Popular	Justo Lukban	2,102	55.33	+12.28
Nacionalista	José Turiano Santiago	1,697	44.67	−12.28
Total votes		3,799	100.00	+24.19
Liga Popular gain from Nacionalista		Swing	12.28	

=== March 1908 special ===
1908 Philippine Assembly special election at Manila's 1st legislative district
Party	Candidate	Votes	%
Nacionalista	Dominador Gómez	1,742	56.95
Liga Popular	Justo Lukban	1,317	43.05
Total votes		3,059	100.00
Nacionalista hold			

== See also ==
- Legislative districts of Manila
