= Isidoro de Santos =

Filipino physician, activist, and legislator

The Honourable Isidoro de Santos
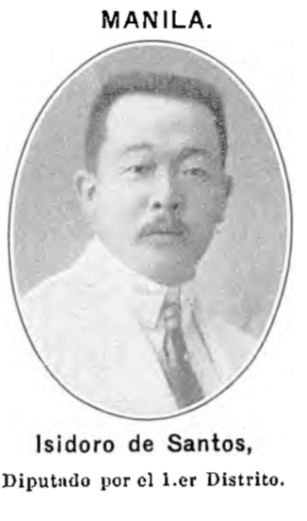
- De Santos as a member of the Philippine Assembly, 1912

Member of the Philippine Assembly from Manila's 1st district
- In office October 16, 1912 – February 24, 1916
- Preceded by: Dominador Gómez
- Succeeded by: Antonio Montenegro

Personal details
- Born: Isidoro de Santos y Ongsiaco; April 4, 1873 Tondo, Manila, Captaincy General of the Philippines
- Died: August 24, 1939 (aged 66) Intramuros, Manila, Philippine Islands
- Resting place: Manila North Cemetery
- Party: Nacionalista
- Domestic partner(s): Sabina Mauricio, Emiliana Trinidad, Rufina Santos
- Children: 18
- Education: University of Santo Tomas; Complutense University of Madrid
- Profession: Physician, Politician
- Nickname(s): Orong, Ikkis, El Joven Telemaco

Isidoro de Santos y Ongsiaco (April 4, 1873 – August 24, 1939) was a Filipino physician, revolutionary, and politician. He was among the earliest Filipino doctors educated in Spain and later served as a member of the Comité Central Filipino in Hong Kong during the Philippine Revolution. De Santos also became a legislator in the Third Philippine Assembly and played a leading role in the advancement of public health and medical institutions during the American colonial period.

== Early life ==
Isidoro de Santos was born on April 4, 1873, in Tondo, Manila. He was the second child and eldest son of Marcelino Rafael de Santos and Irene Ongsiaco y Soriano. His father was a wealthy landowner and lawyer who owned part of Hacienda Esperanza in Nueva Ecija and was a member of La Liga Filipina. He helped finance the Philippine Revolution and the First Philippine Republic and was acquainted with José Rizal. His mother came from a prominent landowning family and died in 1881 at the age of 28. De Santos had four siblings: Pacita "Paz" de Santos-Moreno, José Mariano de Santos, Felipe de Santos, and Consuelo de Santos-Barcelona.

== Education ==
De Santos attended the Colegio de San Juan de Letran (1884–1885) and the University of Santo Tomas, where he earned a Bachiller en Artes (Bachelor of Arts) in 1887. He continued his medical studies at the Colegio de San Jose and Hospital de San Juan de Dios (1888–1889). He later went to Spain with his tutor Santiago Barcelona, studying at the University of Barcelona and Hospital de Santa Cruz (1889–1893), where he earned his Licentiate in Medicine. He pursued postgraduate work at the Universidad Central de Madrid, completing his Doctor of Medicine degree in 1895.

While in Europe, he became active in the Filipino Colony of Barcelona, a group engaged in reformist and propaganda activities. During his stay in Paris, he trained under Étienne Stéphane Tarnier, Adolphe Pinard, and Just Lucas-Championnière. Known as "El Joven Telémaco" ("The Young Telemachus"), he also used the pseudonym "Ikkis" during the Propaganda Movement.

== Revolutionary and Political Activities ==
De Santos returned to the Philippines in 1896 and served as one of Apolinario Mabini's attending physicians, alongside Santiago Barcelona, Ariston Bautista-Lin, Trinidad Pardo de Tavera, and Aquilino Calvo. Mabini also corresponded with him through letters during this period.

When his father was imprisoned by Spanish authorities for alleged revolutionary sympathies, the family fled to Singapore, where they met Emilio Aguinaldo in 1898. De Santos accompanied Aguinaldo in his meeting with U.S. Consul General Edward Spencer Pratt, delivering a speech in French to express Filipino gratitude for America's "promised support" of independence. At the Malolos Congress, his father Marcelino represented Catanduanes, and Santiago Barcelona represented Butuan. Isidoro later taught obstetrics and gynecology at the Universidad Literaria y Cientifica de Filipinas. In 1899, Aguinaldo appointed him Vice Chairman of the Comité Central Filipino in Hong Kong, under Galicano Apacible. The committee coordinated revolutionary activities abroad and received support from Dr. Sun Yat-sen, future president of the Republic of China. That same year, together with Dr. José Lozada and Chinese physician Wang Tang, de Santos attended to Juan Luna before his death in Hong Kong. He returned to the Philippines in 1901.

De Santos and his brother José Mariano were founding members of Club Filipino, established on November 6, 1898. According to some records, he was the first president of the club with Antonio Luna as treasurer, while other accounts cite Telesforo Chuidian as president and De Santos as secretary-treasurer. The club became a prestigious social and political venue for Filipino reformists and elites.

De Santos was a member of the Solidaridad Lodge No. 53 in Madrid and later joined Sinukuan Lodge in the Philippines. In 1912, he and Timoteo Paez persuaded the Rizal family to allow José Rizal's remains to be reinterred under Masonic rites instead of Jesuit custody.The rites took place from December 27 to 30, 1912, culminating in the interment of Rizal's urn beneath the Rizal Monument in Luneta, Manila.

== Public Health and Medical Contributions ==
During the 1903 cholera outbreak, de Santos served on the advisory board on Hygiene of Manila and established a hospital for cholera patients in Gagalangin, Tondo, which he directed without compensation. His contributions to sanitation and epidemic control earned him great public recognition. In 1906, he initiated a citywide hygiene campaign that caught the attention of Governor-General Henry Clay Ide. De Santos co-founded several hospitals, including St. Paul's Hospital, University Hospital, and St. Luke's Free Dispensary (now St. Luke's Medical Center). He chaired the Board of Medical Examiners in 1918 and 1924 and served as president of the Association of Physicians and Pharmacists of the Philippines.

== Personal life ==
He had three partners, all of whom he regarded and treated as equal family units: Sabina Fuentes-Mauricio of Binondo, Manila (d. 1936), Emiliana Yriarte-Trinidad of Caingin, San Rafael, Bulacan, and Rufina Gutierrez-Santos of Quiapo, Manila. He fathered several children with each—five with Mauricio, four with Trinidad, and four with Santos—while five other children died in infancy. Emiliana Yriarte-Trinidad was also said to have served as the model for Juan Luna's painting, Una Bulaqueña.

== IDES O'Racca Building ==
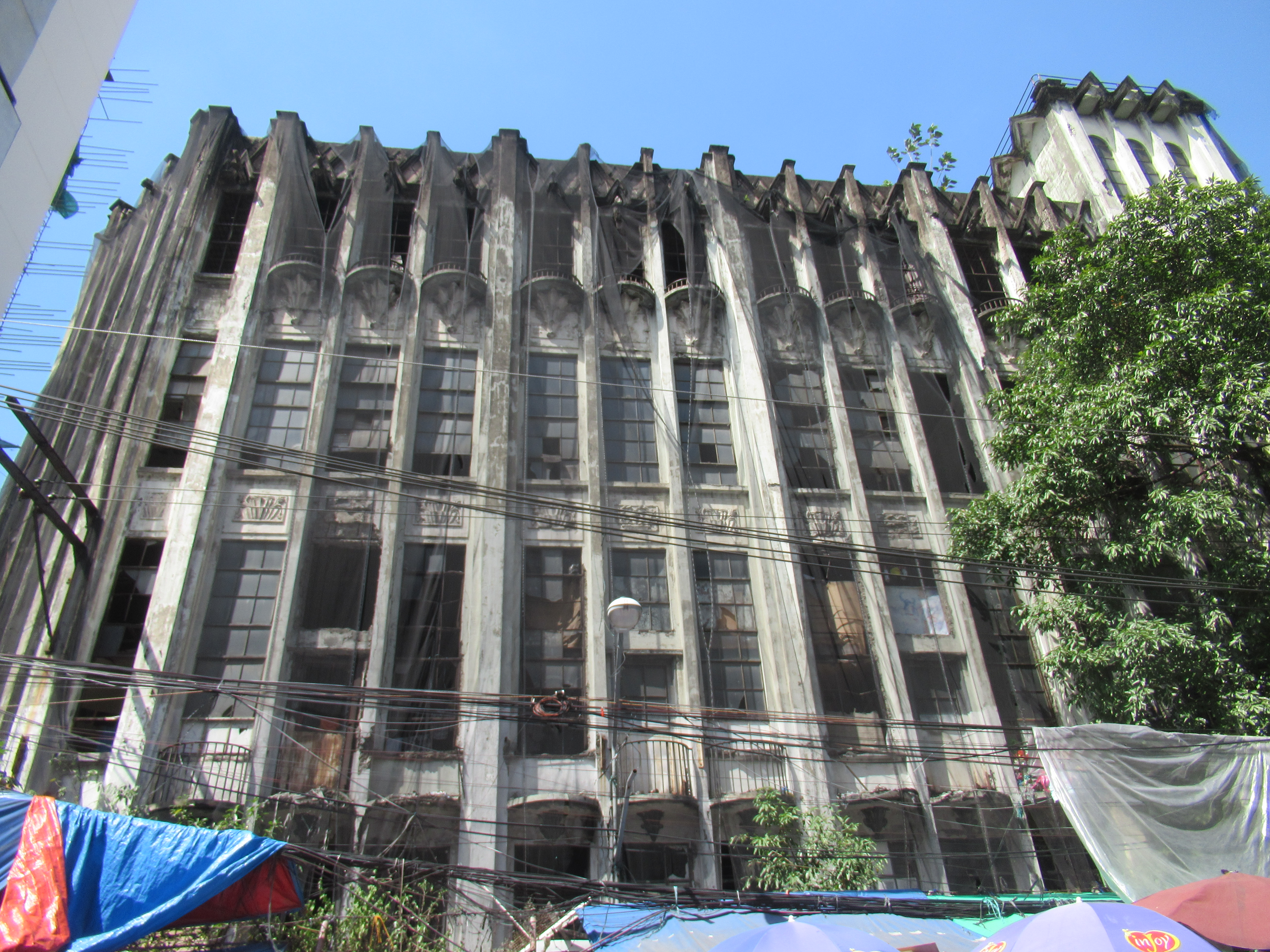
IDES O’Racca Building

The IDES O'Racca Building, originally known as the IDES Building, is an Art Deco commercial and residential structure in San Nicolas, Manila. It was built by Isidoro de Santos as both a family home and an income-generating property. The design provided separate floors for each of his three partners and their children, while the remaining sections were reserved for commercial leasing and cold storage due to its proximity to the Divisoria market.

Designed by German architect Arthur Julius Niclaus Gabler Gumbert, the building features classic Art Deco elements, including vertical bays defined by pilasters, a distinctive fourth-floor row of windows with corbels, and a granolithic split staircase. Though once believed to have been constructed in 1935, existing photographs and advertisements show that the structure was already standing as early as 1931.

The building was financed through mortgages tied to De Santos' land shares in Hacienda Esperanza. After his death, the property was foreclosed, eventually coming under the ownership of the O'Racca Confectionery Company, which had operations in Binondo. During World War II, the building was used by Japanese forces, which spared it from total destruction, and it was later utilized by the U.S. Coast Guard during liberation.

Postwar, it became government property under laws governing former enemy properties and later housed the National Abaca and Other Fibers Corporation. In the decades that followed, the building was leased to various tenants and became the subject of legal disputes involving lease and ownership issues. A major fire in 1964 damaged only interior wooden sections, leaving the concrete structure intact.

In 2010, the building was sold to Rodil Enterprises, though the sale was questioned for undervaluation. It was later acquired by Anchor Land Holdings, though the details of this transfer are not publicly documented.

In 2013, after a petition by local heritage advocates, the IDES O'Racca Building was declared a Cultural Property under the National Museum of the Philippines. In 2021, another petition was filed to upgrade its status to a higher level of cultural protection, reflecting ongoing efforts to preserve the building as one of the remaining pre-war Art Deco structures in San Nicolas.

== Death and Legacy ==
Isidoro de Santos died on August 24, 1939, at San Juan de Dios Hospital in Intramuros, Manila at the age of 66. He was buried in the De Santos Family Mausoleum at the Manila North Cemetery.

The National Historical Commission of the Philippines approved the fabrication of his historical marker in December 2022.
