= 1908 Manila's 1st Philippine Assembly district special elections =

March 1908 Manila's 1st assembly district special election
- March 30, 1908

Manila's 1st district seat in the Philippine Assembly. Elected by simple majority using first past the post. Triggered by expulsion of incumbent
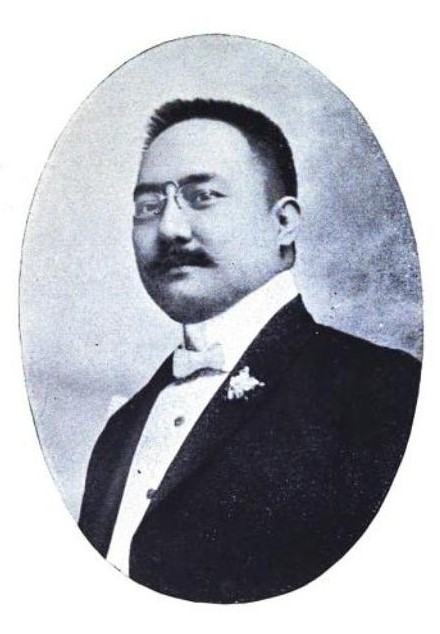

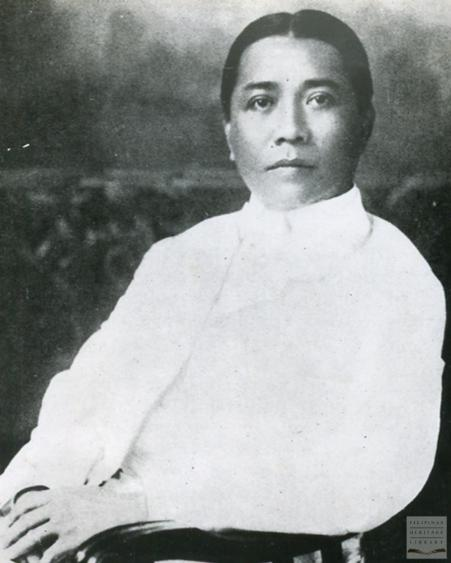
Candidate	Dominador Gómez	Justo Lukban
Party	Nacionalista	Liga Popular Nacional
Popular vote	1,742	1,317
Percentage	56.95%	43.05%
Delegate before election
Dominador Gómez
Nacionalista
Subsequent delegate
Dominador Gómez
Nacionalista
- August 1908 Manila's 1st assembly district special election
- August 12, 1908

Manila's 1st district seat in the Philippine Assembly. Elected by simple majority using first past the post. Triggered by resignation of incumbent
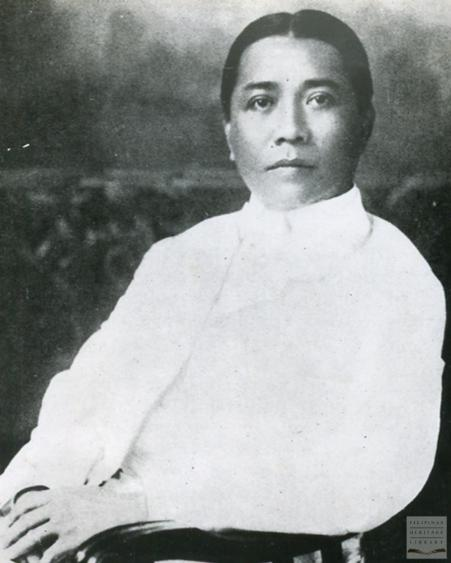

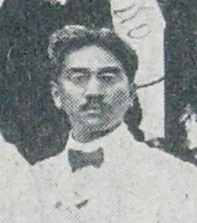
Candidate	Justo Lukban	José Turiano Santiago
Party	Liga Popular Nacional	Nacionalista
Popular vote	2,102	1,697
Percentage	55.33%	44.67%
Delegate before election
Dominador Gómez
Nacionalista
Subsequent delegate
Justo Lukban
Liga Popular Nacional

Two special elections (known elsewhere as "by-elections") for Manila's 1st (North) district's seat in the Philippine Assembly, the lower house of the Philippine Legislature of the Insular Government of the Philippine Islands, were held on 1908. Justo Lukban won the second election, after Dominador Gómez, winner of the 1907 general election, was expelled from office, then won the first special election, finally only to resign his rights as member of the assembly.

These special elections were the first of its kind in the Philippines.

== Background ==
The Nacionalista Party was brought about by the merger of the Union Nacionalista, which chose an evolutionary position on Philippine independence, and the Independistas, led by Alberto Barretto and Justo Lukban, which advocated immediate independence. The two organizations merged on March 2, 1907, to oppose the Progresista Party, which opposed independence, after withdrawing their platform of Philippine U.S. statehood.

Fernando Guerrero, who was earlier elected as counselors of the Nacionalistas along with Cebu 2nd district Assemblyman Sergio Osmeña, and Lukban, were dropped from the ballot in favor of Dominador Gómez and Felipe del Mar. Guerrero and Lukban then set up Liga Nacional Independecia to oppose the Nacionalistas.

The 1st Philippine Legislature convened for the first time on October 16, 1907, after elections earlier that year. Osmeña was elected Speaker. Osmeña had then successfully prevented Gómez from taking his seat, questioning his citizenship, until he was elected speaker.

=== District profile ===
Manila's 1st district, also known as the North district, consisted of the western Manila districts of Tondo, Binondo, San Nicolas, and Intramuros since it was established in 1907.

== First election ==
By February 1908, Osmeña and his adjutant, Tayabas 1st district Assemblyman Manuel L. Quezon, saw Gómez as their primary opponent for control of the legislature. Osmeña has most of the Nacionalistas behind him, while Gómez was counting on the support of the dissatisfied Nacionalistas and members of the Progresistas. In February, Gómez denounced the moves to unseat him in a speech before the assembly. Those who wanted to unseat Gómez planned to replace him with Lukban, who was the defeated candidate in the 1907 election. A day after his speech, the assembly moved to vacate Gómez's seat, 40–35. A week later, Gómez, in a letter to the assembly, said that he would no longer contest his removal, paving way for a special election. This also made the motions for reconsideration, and for an investigation to an extra "mysterious vote" for Gómez's removal, be moot and academic.

Gómez expressed his intention to run in the special election in March. Lukban also expressed his intention to run, seeing a rematch of the 1907 election.

=== Results ===
March 1908 Manila's 1st Philippine Assembly district special election
Candidate	Party	Votes	%
Dominador Gómez	Nacionalista Party	1,742	56.95
Justo Lukban	Liga Popular	1,317	43.05
Total		3,059	100.00
Majority		425	13.89
Nacionalista Party hold			

The March 30 election saw Gómez successfully defending his seat. His victory was celebrated at the Rizal Theater later that night, and rumors of him actually reclaiming his seat at the Ayuntamiento de Manila led to the Manila Police District securing the premises but Gómez did not show up.

By June, Osmeña read a letter by Gómez to the assembly of the latter resigning his rights as duly elected representative of Manila's first district. This means that the contested seat is again vacant.

== Second election ==
The Nacionalistas have nominated José Turiano Santiago, a former Nueva Ecija delegate to the Malolos Congress, for the vacant seat on July 6. Meanwhile, Lukban contested the seat anew; Gómez, for his part, is contesting a seat at the newly provided Municipal Board of Manila. A clash between their supporters occurred at Calle Azcarraga at the eve of the election on August 11. Lukban's supporters, being led by Lope K. Santos, were first harassed by Gómez supporters, which later led to a full-blown riot. After the fight was dispersed, the Gómez supporters had a meeting at Calle Acuña, guarded by the police.

=== Results ===
August 1908 Manila's 1st Philippine Assembly district special election
Candidate	Party	Votes	%	+/–
Justo Lukban	Liga Popular	2,102	55.33	+12.28
José Turiano Santiago	Nacionalista Party	1,697	44.67	−12.28
Total		3,799	100.00	–
Majority		405	10.66	−3.23
Liga Popular gain from Nacionalista Party		Swing		+12.28

While Lukban won the assembly seat, Gómez lost the municipal board election to Ramon Diokno. Commissioner Rafael Palma, who was surprised of Gómez's defeat, attributed it to Gómez's attacks against Osmeňa, which reduced his popularity with the masses. A Manila Times editorial emphasized the victories of the Liga Popular Nacional against the regular Nacionalista Party; the latter was seen as being dominated by aristocrats, who are mostly mestizos. The election results were announced at the junction of the Puente de España and Escolta Street in Binondo, on a screen set up in front of the La Extremeña Building.

Later that year, Diokno renounced his claims from the seat amidst the electoral protest filed by Gómez. Gómez later reclaimed his old assembly seat in 1909, when he won on a successful electoral protest against Lukban. Lukban later on became Mayor of Manila.
