= 1907 Philippine Assembly elections =

1st Philippine Assembly elections

- July 30, 1907

All 80 seats in the Philippine Assembly 41 seats needed for a majority
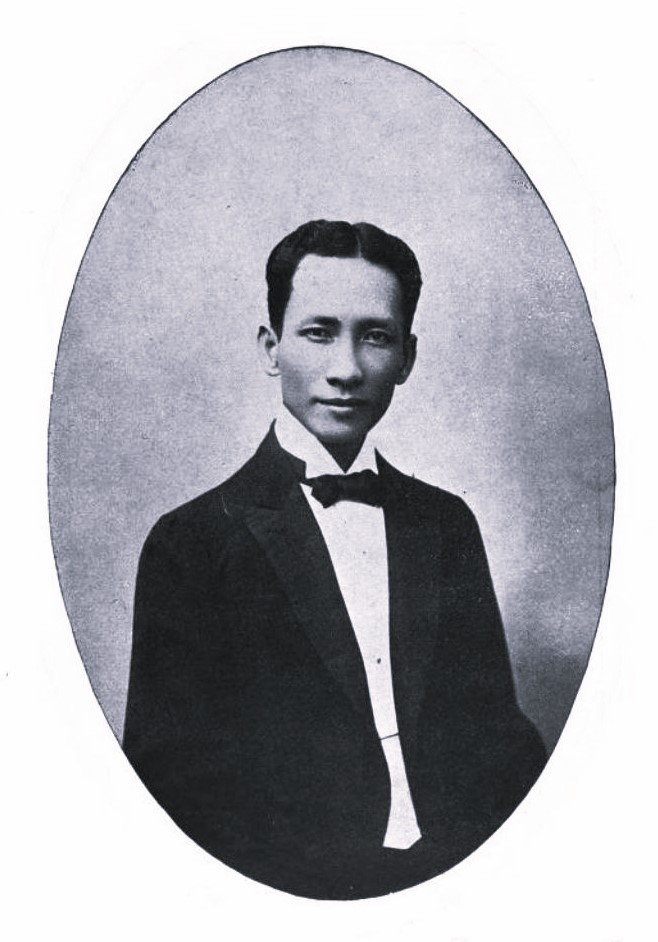

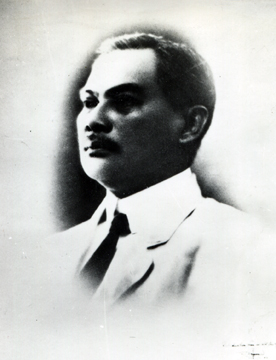
	Majority party	Minority party
Leader	Sergio Osmeña	Arsenio Cruz Herrera
Party	Nacionalista	Progresista
Leader's seat	Cebu–2nd	Rizal–1st (lost)
Seats won	32 + 27 coalition	16
Popular vote	64,281	24,234
Percentage	65.43%	24.67%
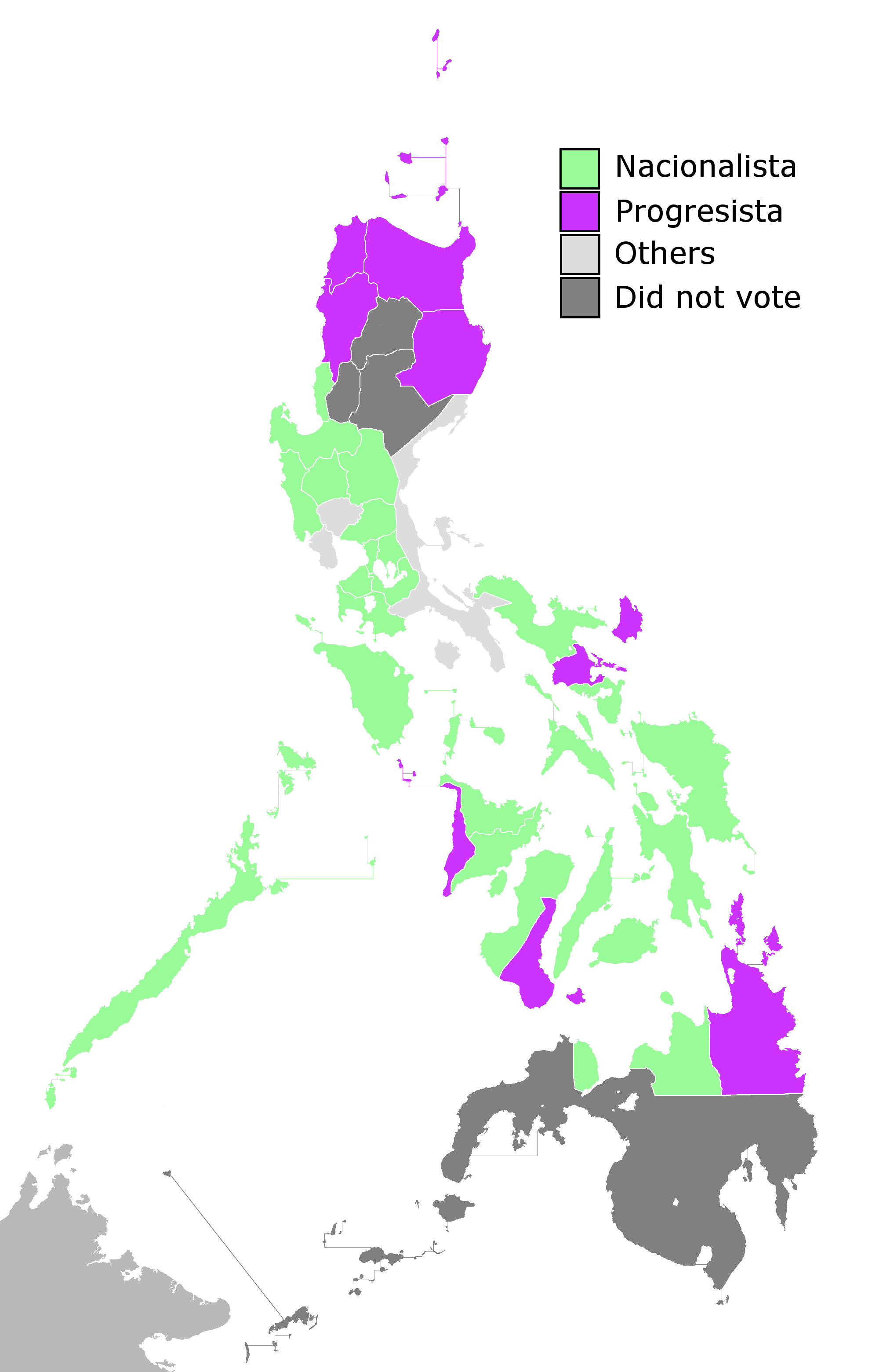
- Coalitions that won a plurality of votes in each province.
Speaker before election
None (Pedro Paterno served as Malolos Congress President)
Elected Speaker
Sergio Osmeña
Nacionalista

The first Philippine Assembly elections were held across the Philippines on July 30, 1907. The Philippine Organic Act of 1902, enacted by the United States Congress, established a bicameral Philippine Legislature composed of the appointed Philippine Commission as the upper house and the elected Philippine Assembly as the lower house.

The first national election for a legislative body in the Philippines, and considered to be a de facto independence referendum, the newly formed Nacionalista Party, advocating independence, defeated the more established Progresista Party, which were conservative.

== Formation of political parties ==
With the conclusion of the Philippine–American War (then known as the "Philippine Insurrection") and the establishment of the American colonial Insular Government under the Philippine Organic Act of 1902, elections were held in various parts of the Philippines. Divisions developed between the Federalistas who advocated for statehood within the United States, and the Independistas those who advocated for independence. Opponents to American rule were unable to mount a united front for the 1906 local elections, with only the Comitė de Intereses Filipinos who were a united, yet limited, organization. By mid-1906, those opposed to American rule began organizing themselves into political parties.

The Comitė de la Union Nacional and the Partido Popular Independista merged to create the Partido de la Union Nacionalista. The Union Nacionalistas rejected a hardline path and instead chose an evolutionary position. Meanwhile, the Independistas urged immediate independence from the U.S. After failing to broker a deal with the Independistas, the Union Nacionalista proposed a merger with the Federalistas. Juan Sumulong, who led the Federalistas, advocated a radical policy, more in line with the "conservative" wing of the Union Nacionalistas led by Rafael Palma. The Federalistas consulted Governor-General James Francis Smith, who then sought to advise Taft on the matter. Both Smith and Taft opposed the union, with Smith saying to Sumulong that a fusion will "result in the complete obliteration of the conservative element as a political actor in the community." The refusal of Federalistas reopened talks between the Union Nacionalista and the Independistas.

The Independistas organized themselves in January 1907 with a leadership election. To prevent further split, Alberto Barretto and Justo Lukban were elected co-leaders of the party. The election of Fernando Guerrero, Sergio Osmeña, Teodoro Sandiko and Isauro Gabaldon as counselors marked the first time that a Manila-based political group established links with provincial leaders.

=== The Nacionalistas and the Progresistas ===
In late January, the Federalistas organized themselves under a new name, Partido Nacional Progresista and launched a campaign to win seats in provinces around Manila. The nationalist-leaning groups launched negotiations to present a unified slate in the elections; Meanwhile, Palma insisted on having the word "Immediata" (immediate) to the party name of the proposed merger of the Union Nacionalistas and the Independistas. On March 12, 1907, the Union Nacionalista and the Independistas merged to form the Partido Nacionalista.

While the Nacionalistas had a rotating leadership, the manner of selection of the candidates was a source of major dispute and the party convention at the Manila Grand Opera House ended in disarray. The Progresistas, on the other hand, dropped Federal from the party name seeing that the word had outlived its usefulness and had changed their name to Partido Nacional Progresista (National Progressive Party).

== Campaign ==
While the Nacionalistas were in disarray, the Progresistas orchestrated a well-organized "popular assembly". The Progresistas established networks of local strongmen already associated with the Nacionalistas; however, they were only able to field candidates in half of the districts in Central and southwestern Luzon. The Progresistas were unable to recruit supporters even in places where a Progresista was already in office, apart from Tarlac. In Manila, the Progresistas resorted to encouraging Americans to register and vote for them. However, the Federalistas were able to field candidates in rural areas in Visayas and Mindanao.

While the Progresistas were struggling to increase their ranks, they instead relied on a strategy to ensure the defeat of Nacionalistas candidates who opposed Progresista policies.

The Nacionalistas split their ranks when Guerrero and Lukban, members of the old Independista group were dropped from the ticket in favor of Dominador Gomez and Felipe del Pan. Quezon, brokered a deal that set a party convention to settle candidacies but it was never convened; Gomez and del Pan remained the official candidates for the "regular" Nacionalistas. Guerrero and Lukban ultimately set up the Liga Nacional Independecia whose sole purpose was to contest the 1907 elections.

The Progresistas led by Trinidad Pardo de Tavera, on the other hand, opposed "immediate" independence. The reception at Progresista political rallies ranged from lukewarm to hostile, with people heckling "Hang them, kill them".

On election day, the Partido Nacionalista, with its national organization in disarray, was able to field a candidate in 68 of the 80 districts.

== Results ==
↓

32	16	12	20
Nacionalista	Progresista	Others	Ind

Party	Votes	%	Seats
Nacionalista Party	34,277	35.71	32
Progresista Party	24,234	25.25	16
Immediatista	7,126	7.42	7
Independista	6,179	6.44	4
Catholic Party	1,192	1.24	1
Philippine Independent Church	91	0.09	0
Independent	22,878	23.84	20
Total	95,977	100.00	80
Valid votes	95,977	97.69	
Invalid/blank votes	2,274	2.31	
Total votes	98,251	–	
Registered voters/turnout	104,966	93.60	

Vote share
NP	35.71%
PP	25.25%
Others	39.03%

Seats
NP	40.00%
PP	20.00%
Others	40.00%

=== Votes by province ===
Province/City	Nacionalista	Progresista	Immediatista	Independista	Catholic	Philippine Independent Church	Independent	Rejected	Scattered
Albay	–	2,196	–	–	–	–	1,415	–	55
Ambos Camarines	1,577	334	–	–	–	–	244	–	58
Antique	–	604	–	–	–	–	352	–	47
Bataan	–	–	–	379	–	–	359	–	11
Batangas	2,113	85	–	–	–	–	1,455	–	55
Bohol	–	–	–	–	–	–	1,594	–	76
Bulacan	1,950	–	–	–	–	–	948	–	–
Cagayan	–	1,434	–	–	–	–	725	–	58
Capiz	889	1,177	–	–	–	–	2,600	137	39
Cavite	2,686	–	–	–	–	–	–	–	61
Cebu	3,088	–	–	–	445	–	–	–	159
Ilocos Norte	747	1,421	–	–	–	91	85	–	106
Ilocos Sur	1,619	2,005	–	–	–	–	95	–	54
Iloilo	–	1,773	2,275	–	–	–	1,779	–	75
Isabela	–	549	–	529	–	–	199	–	34
La Laguna	2,635	795	–	–	–	–	–	–	132
La Union	1,297	1,284	–	–	–	–	585	–	–
Leyte	3,025	510	125	–	–	–	98	–	69
Manila	5,671	1,361	–	–	59	–	98	14	3
Mindoro	437	–	–	–	–	–	153	–	32
Misamis	–	–	–	–	–	–	1,038	–	112
Negros Occidental	–	1,005	1,405	–	–	–	–	100	179
Negros Oriental	–	912	614	–	–	–	–	–	31
Nueva Ecija	1,385	697	–	–	–	–	–	–	13
Palawan	48	–	–	–	–	–	217	–	23
Pampanga	–	874	–	1,448	–	–	456	–	13
Pangasinan	615	570	2,637	–	600	–	1,909	–	69
Rizal	1,957	1,477	–	–	88	–	–	–	45
Samar	137	193	70	–	–	–	2,565	–	184
Sorsogon	665	430	–	–	–	–	1,510	–	53
Surigao	–	745	–	–	–	–	–	–	44
Tarlac	1,234	946	–	–	–	–	–	18	18
Tayabas	–	857	–	3,823	–	–	2,237	–	24
Zambales	502	–	–	–	–	–	162	–	73
Total	34,277	24,234	7,126	6,179	1,192	91	22,878	269	2,005
Source: Government Printing Office

== Aftermath ==
While the candidates representing the Nacionalistas won the majority of the seats in the assembly, the maneuvering around the election for the Speaker of the Assembly began, as the Speaker would be the most powerful Filipino in government. Quezon and Osmeña focused on aggregating the delegates around Osmeña's leadership, a task that was easier than anticipated. With less than two dozen delegates, the Progresistas were not be able to elect a Speaker from their ranks and were marginalized from talks amongst the Nacionalistas. Osmeña found two opponents for the Speakership: Gomez, who defeated Lukban by 31 votes, and Pedro Paterno. However, Gomez's citizenship was questioned, and Paterno found himself to be Osmeña's leading opponent.

Gomez was found to be a Spanish citizen and a new election for his seat was called. Gomez still ran in the special election in 1908 and beat Lukban by a larger margin, about 400 votes. Gomez was permitted to take his seat, but not after seven months had passed, and after Osmeña was elected Speaker on October 16, 1907, with Quezon as the majority floor leader.

The defeat of the Progresistas in the elections hastened their downfall; the Nacionalista Party would continue to dominate the elections for the legislature, while the Progresistas, and later their successor the Democratas, would remain in opposition.

== See also ==
- 1st Philippine Legislature
