= Ambos Camarines's at-large congressional district =

Congressional district of the Philippines

Ambos Camarines's at-large congressional district may refer to one occasion when a provincewide at-large district was used in an election to a Philippine national legislature from the historical province of Ambos Camarines. The former province was represented by four representatives in the National Assembly of the First Philippine Republic in 1898 following its reorganization under Article 6 of the Decreto de 18 junio de 1898 y las instrucciones sobre el régimen de las provincias y pueblos. It elected two members to the nascent Malolos Congress with two more members having been appointed by the same congress. The district was abolished after the fall of the First Republic and the start of American rule in 1901. Ambos Camarines was immediately reestablished as a province in the same year and elected its representatives to the Philippine Assembly from three congressional districts created under the Philippine Commission Act No. 1582 on January 9, 1907.

== Representation history ==
#	Term of office		National Assembly	Seat A				Seat B				Seat C				Seat D			
#	Start	End	National Assembly	Image	Member	Party	Electoral history	Image	Member	Party	Electoral history	Image	Member	Party	Electoral history	Image	Member	Party	Electoral history
=== Ambos Camarines's at-large district for the Malolos Congress ===
District created June 18, 1898.
–	September 15, 1898	March 23, 1901	1st		Tomás Arejola	Independent	Elected in 1898.		Justo Lukban	Independent	Elected in 1898.		Mariano Queri Gómez	Independent	Appointed.		Valeriano Velarde	Independent	Appointed.
District dissolved into Ambos Camarines's 1st, 2nd and 3rd districts for the Philippine Assembly.

== See also ==
- Legislative districts of Camarines Norte
- Legislative districts of Camarines Sur
