= Angel Roco =

Filipino lawyer and politician

Ángel Roco
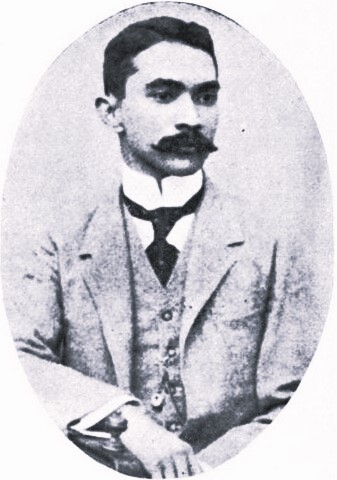
- Photograph from Album Histórico de la Primera Asamblea Filipina, 1908

Member of the Philippine Assembly from Albay's 3rd district
- In office October 16, 1907 – October 16, 1909
- Preceded by: District established
- Succeeded by: Felix Samson

Personal details
- Born: August 2, 1877 Guinobatan, Albay, Captaincy General of the Philippines
- Party: Progresista
- Education: Colegio de San Juan de Letran; University of Santo Tomas (LLB)

Ángel Roco Domínguez (August 2, 1877 – after 1909) was a Filipino lawyer and politician who served as the representative for Albay's 3rd district in the Philippine Assembly from 1907 until 1909. He was a member of the Progresista Party.

== Life and career ==
Roco was born on August 2, 1877, in Guinobatan, Albay. He began his secondary studies at Colegio de San Juan de Letran in 1886 and his law studies at the University of Santo Tomas in 1891, completing his law degree in 1898. He immediately entered the business sector, working as a clerk for the Gutierrez brothers' business in Legaspi, Albay.

On April 14, 1904, after completing the required examinations, he received his law degree from the Supreme Court and eventually practiced law in the province. He was a member of the prestigious law firm Sierra & Roco, which had a large clientele both within and outside the province, consisting mainly of major commercial houses and corporations, including the Manila Railroad Company.

In July 1907, he was elected to the Philippine Assembly, representing Albay's 3rd district. He served in the 1st Philippine Legislature until 1909.

He is the brother of former Philippine senator Leoncio Imperial.

House of Representatives of the Philippines
New district	Member of the Philippine Assembly for Albay's 3rd district 1907–1909	Succeeded by Felix Samson
