= Tomás Aréjola =

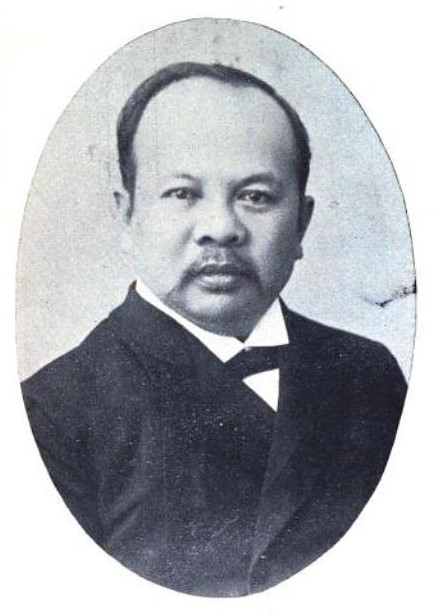
- Aréjola as a member of the Philippine Assembly, 1908

Member of the Philippine Assembly from Ambos Camarines's 1st District
- In office 1907–1912
- Preceded by: Position established
- Succeeded by: Silverio D. Cecilio

Senator of the Philippines from the 6th district
- Election nullified before taking office

Member of the Malolos Congress from Ambos Camarines
- In office September 15, 1898 – November 13, 1899 Serving with Justo Lukban, Valeriano Velarde, and Mariano Abella

Personal details
- Born: Tomás Aréjola y Padilla; September 18, 1865 Nueva Caceres, Ambos Camarines, Captaincy General of the Philippines (now Naga City, Camarines Sur, Philippines)
- Died: May 22, 1926 (aged 60) Philippine Islands
- Spouse: Mercedes Caldera y Olarte (m. 1909)
- Occupation: Lawyer, legislator and diplomat

Tomás Aréjola y Padilla (September 18, 1865 – May 22, 1926) was a Filipino lawyer, legislator, diplomat, political writer and a propagandist during the Spanish colonial period. A mason and a liberal, he openly campaigned for political reforms in the Philippines. But this was to pass and the Americans took over. During the Commonwealth period, Aréjola joined the Nacionalista Party becoming its first vice-president and twice in the elections of 1907 and 1911 was elected the Representative of Ambos Camarines.

== Early life and education ==
Aréjola was born in Nueva Caceres (now Naga City) in Ambos Camarines, Philippines (now Camarines Sur). His parents were Antonio Aréjola and Emeteria Padilla and he had five siblings: Ludovico, who became a General in the Filipino-American War, Leoncio, who became a priest and three women, Fabiana, Encarnacion and Dolores. Prominent and wealthy, his family possessed large tracts of farmland in the province and was into cattle-raising.

Aréjola studied Humanities at the Colegio Seminario de Nueva Cáceres (1878–1884) and took his Bachelor of Arts at the Colegio de San Juan de Letran. By 1886, he earned a Surveyor's degree at the University of Santo Tomas while also starting a Law course in the same school. He convinced his father to allow him to finish his law in Madrid. He was disgusted with his professors who were favoring the Spanish mestizos in his school. So in August 1886 he sailed for Spain. In 1888 when he was aged 22, he finished his course in Law at the Central Universidad de Madrid.

== Life in Madrid ==
A prolific writer and a brilliant orator, he found common cause with the Filipino propagandists residing in Madrid. José Rizal, Marcelo del Pilar, Graciano López Jaena, Juan Luna and many others became his close friends and they all were one in crying out for reforms in the colonial administration of the country. Aréjola was bold particularly in writing articles in the more liberal newspapers in Madrid spelling out three demands upon the Spanish colonial authorities:

1. institute political reforms in the administration of the colony,
2. representation of the Philippines to the Spanish Cortes,
3. conversion of the Philippine as an integral province of Spain.

== Circulo Hispano-Filipino ==
He became a very active member of the Asociación Hispano-Filipino whose president was Prof. Miguel Morayta of the Central Universidad de Madrid. He also joined the Colonia Organizada de Madrid whose first president was José Rizal. When the Asociacion Hispano-Filipino folded up, he organized the Circulo Hispano-Filipino where he became its first president and its secretary was Mariano Ponce.

His love for his country was unremitting and his articles were almost ubiquitous in La Vanguardia (Madrid), El París, El Progreso, La Correspondencia de España, Heraldo de Madrid and in La solidaridad, the newspaper put up by the Filipino ilustrados in Barcelona. The dominant theme in his articles was for the institution of political reforms in his home country.

In 1896, at the time he was president of Circulo Hispano-Filipino, the revolution in the Spanish Philippines broke out and he was hauled to prison on suspicion he was connected with the rebellion at home. According to Evelyn Caldera Soriano in her book Bicolano Revolutionaries, Aréjola was detained for four days in the Cárcel Modelo of Madrid together with José Oriola and Francisco Colón as reported in La Correspondencia which wrote of the existence of a club of Filipino separatists sympathetic to the Cuban rebels. He was released after finding no solid evidence against him. To cool things off, he hied off Lisbon in Portugal. But shortly after, he returned to Madrid where he became the president of the newly organized Filipino Republican Committee which was more militant than the previous organizations he joined.

Sadly, news reached him that amidst the turmoil in his home country, his father Antonio Aréjola and his brother Ludovico were arrested and exiled to Fernando Po in Equatorial Guinea together with other Filipinos who came from Albay province. But due to his connections with influential Masons such as Dr. Miguel Morayta, Emilio Castelar and Francisco Pi y Margall, he obtained the release of his father Antonio and one Albayano named Macario Samson. Afterwards, in February 1898 he obtained the freedom of his brother Ludovico and ten other Filipinos.

Amidst this turmoil, Spain was already about to conclude the Treaty of Paris with the United States of America in the last month of 1898. Taking advantage of the period, Aguinaldo and his men formed the Malolos Congress on January 1, 1898, and after approving a Constitution, declared the independence of the Philippines on June 12, 1898. Aréjola returned home previously by way of Hong Kong where he participated in organizing the Central Revolutionary Committee headed by Galicano Apacible. Aréjola was one of the four delegates representing Ambos Camarines in the historic Congress. His three other co-delegates were Justo Lucban, Valeriano Velarde and Mariano Quien.

== The American Dispensation ==
By December 1898, Spain formally turned over the Philippine colony to the United States of America through the Treaty of Paris in the amount of 20 million dollars. This was an exceptional period, Spanish power was on the wane, American power was rising on the horizon and the Filipino aspiration for self-governance was emerging but this was to be nipped in the bud. The Filipino forces under Emilio Aguinaldo battled the American army but the superiority in arms of the latter proved too much. In fact, Aréjola's brother Ludovico became the General who met the oncoming American forces in Ambos Camarines but his brother's army was puny and ill-equipped and by March 31, 1901, Ludovico's ragtag army surrendered and entered Naga and was received by the Americans in full honors.

Meanwhile, Tomás Aréjola, between 1902 and 1906 was in Japan together with Mariano Ponce and other educated Filipinos who were already planning to carry the fight thru parliamentary means. By 1907, they organized the Nacionalista Party. Aréjola became its first vice-president and in the subsequent elections he ran twice for two terms as the Representative of the first district of Ambos Camarines and won (1907–1912).

In Congress, he became the Chairman of the Committee on Public Works, Forests and Mines and member of the Committee on Railways, Schools and Franchises. Thru his efforts, roads in Polangui were built, roads connecting Daet, San Vicente, Talisay and Indan were constructed while a road linking Tigaon to Goa became a reality. The bridge in Tabuco, Naga City and the Pawili bridge in Bula were his pet projects. He was the creator of the town of Canaman. Markets, and many schools he also legislated into existence among which was the Nueva Caceres High School (now Camarines Sur National High School) and other schools in Ambos Camarines but now within the province of Camarines Norte. He was also the major proponent of the law establishing the National Library of the Philippines.

In the election of 1916, Bicol was an entire senatorial district (6th District) and Aréjola won the office as Senator from the said district, alongside José Fuentebella. The election for the district, however, was nullified by Governor-General Francis Burton Harrison due to irregularities. Still up for a fight, Aréjola run as a candidate in the election of 1919 for provincial governors. However, it was Julián Ocampo who won in the election. After this, he quit politics for good.

His service to the nation was almost for a lifetime and he only married at the late age of 44. On December 4, 1909, he married a 16-year-old Spanish lass, Mercedes Caldera, daughter of a Spanish surgeon named Bibiano Caldera. They enjoyed a blissful marriage for sixteen years but unfortunately they bore no children. Aréjola died in 1926 at the age of 60 due to tuberculosis.
