= Jose T. Nueno =

Filipino lawyer and politician (1900–1967)

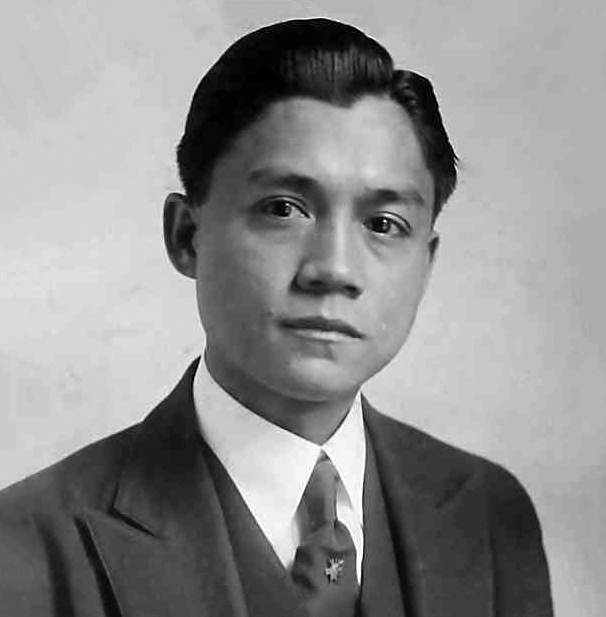
- Nueno in 1924

Member of the Philippine House of Representatives for Manila's 1st district
- In office May 25, 1946 – December 30, 1949
- Preceded by: Engracio Clemeña
- Succeeded by: Engracio Clemeña

Personal details
- Born: Jose Topacio Nueno; April 10, 1900 Imus, Cavite, Philippine Islands
- Died: April 21, 1967 (aged 67)
- Party: Liberal (1946–1951; 1953–1967)
- Other political affiliations: Independent (1951–1953); Popular Front (until 1946)

Military service
- Allegiance: Philippines; United States
- Branch/service: United States Army
- Rank: Colonel
- Unit: 11th Airborne Division

Jose Topacio Nueno (April 10, 1900 – April 21, 1967) was a Filipino lawyer, columnist, and politician who served as a member of the Philippine House of Representatives for Manila's 1st congressional district from 1946 to 1949. He previously served as a member of the Manila Municipal Board.

== Early life ==
Nueno was born on April 10, 1900, in Imus, Cavite, to Felipe Topacio and Dionisia Nueno.

== Career ==
From 1923 to 1925, Nueno was part of the Philippine delegation to the Parliamentary Independence Mission in the United States. He was later elected to the Manila Municipal Board and, during World War II, served as a guerrilla colonel in the 11th Airborne Division of the United States Army.

Nueno was elected to the House of Representatives in 1946, representing Manila's 1st district. He was reportedly noted to have introduced a resolution preventing six representatives-elect of the Democratic Alliance, namely Jesus Lava of Bulacan; Jose A. Cando and Constancio Padilla of Nueva Ecija; Amado Yuzon and Luis Taruc, the party leader, of Pampanga; and Alejandro Simpaoco of Tarlac; as well as representative-elect Alejo Santos of Bulacan and three senators-elect from the Nacionalista Party, Ramon Diokno, Jose O. Vera, and Jose E. Romero, from assuming office on grounds of electoral fraud and terrorism.

In 1949, Nueno ran for the Senate under the Avelino wing of the Liberal Party and as an independent candidate in 1951, losing both elections.

He attempted to return to the House of Representatives in 1953, running for Manila's 2nd district seat, but lost to Joaquin Roces.

== Personal life and legacy ==
The Jose Topacio Nueno Monument in Imus, Cavite

Nueno died on April 21, 1967. An avenue and a monument, inaugurated in 2025 in his hometown of Imus on the occasion of his 125th birth anniversary, were named in his honor.

== Electoral history ==
Electoral history of Jose T. Nueno
Year	Office	Party	Votes received				Result
Year	Office	Party	Total	%	P.	Swing	Result
1946	Representative (Manila–1st)	Popular Front	—N/a	—N/a	1st	—N/a	Won
1949	Senator of the Philippines	Liberal (Avelino wing)	391,394	10.93%	17th	—N/a	Lost
1951	Senator of the Philippines	Independent	93,246	2.12%	18th	−8.81	Lost
1953	Representative (Manila–2nd)	Liberal	5,596	14.94%	2nd	—N/a	Lost

House of Representatives of the Philippines
Preceded by Engracio Clemeña	Member of the Philippine House of Representatives for Manila's 1st district 1946–1949	Succeeded by Engracio Clemeña
