= Justo Lukban =

Filipino physician and politician

The Honorable Justo Lukbán
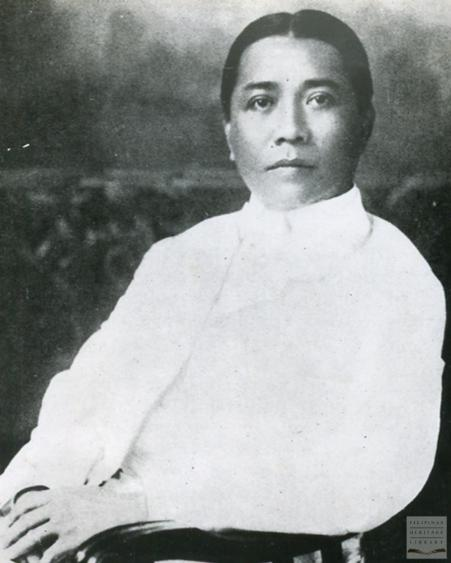
- Lukbán in c. 1917

3rd Mayor of Manila
- In office January 16, 1917 – March 6, 1920
- Vice Mayor: Pablo Ocampo
- Preceded by: Félix M. Roxas
- Succeeded by: Ramón Fernández

4th Vice Mayor of Manila
- In office August 8, 1911 – August 8, 1915
- Mayor: Félix M. Roxas
- Preceded by: Isabelo de los Reyes
- Succeeded by: Pablo Ocampo

Member of the Philippine Assembly from Manila's 1st district
- In office August 11, 1908 – January 26, 1911
- Preceded by: Dominador Gómez
- Succeeded by: Dominador Gómez

Member of the Malolos Congress from Ambos Camarines
- In office September 15, 1898 – November 13, 1899 Serving with Tomás Aréjola, Valeriano Velarde, and Mariano Abella

Personal details
- Born: Justo Lukbán y Rilles; May 28, 1863 Labo, Ambos Camarines, Captaincy General of the Philippines
- Died: September 2, 1927 (aged 64) Manila, Philippine Islands
- Resting place: Mausoleo de los Veteranos de la Revolución, Manila North Cemetery
- Party: Liga Popular (c. 1908–1911)
- Profession: Physician

Military service
- Allegiance: Katipunan; First Philippine Republic
- Battles/wars: Philippine Revolution

Justo Lukbán y Rilles (May 28, 1863 – September 2, 1927) was a Filipino physician and politician, Lukban was elected to the Philippine Assembly and was the 3rd Mayor of Manila from 1917 until 1920, he also served as the 3rd Vice Mayor of Manila from 1911 to 1915.

== Early life ==
Justo Lukban was born in Labo, nowadays part of the Philippine province of Camarines Norte. He was the second child from a family of six children of Agustin Lukbán and Andrea Rilles. One of his three brothers was General Vicente Lukbán. He enrolled in 1873 at the Colegio de San Juan de Letran where he achieved a Bachelor of Arts-degree. Afterwards, Lukban studied medicine at the University of Santo Tomas. In 1888, he achieved his medical license and started his own practice in Manila.

== Philippine Revolution and Philippine-American War ==
After the outbreak of the Philippine Revolution Lukban joined the revolutionary movement, just like his brother Vicente. He served as a medical officer. After the signing of the Pact of Biak-na-Bato on December 15, 1897, Lukban left for Hong Kong together with Emilio Aguinaldo and other Filipino leaders, where they lived in voluntary exile. In August 1898, he was named by Vincente Lukban as Councilor to the Central Directorate of the Hong Kong Junta. After his return to the Philippines in 1898, Lukban represented the province of as one of the members of the Malolos Congress. He was a member of the Council of Defense and Aid and head of the Medical Faculty at the newly established Universidad Literaria de Filipinas.

He served as a General in the Siege of Masbate on August 19, 1898. Authorized to collect money for the revolutionary cause, he managed to collect an amount of ₱20,200 for the Revolutionary Government. When the Philippine Revolutionary Army was defeated in central Luzon by the Americans, Lukban was one of the negotiators for a peaceful surrender to the US as a member of the Asociacion De Paz, which was led by Pedro Paterno and Felipe Buencamino. During that time he had the rank of Major. After his surrender, the Americans appointed him as Military Sanitary Health Inspector for Ambos Camarines.

== Political career ==
In 1902 Lukban founded, together with Jose Maria de la Viña, Albert Barreto and León María Guerrero, the Partido Democrata, which pledged for Philippine independence through peaceful means. In May 1903, Lukban charged the Manila Jockey Club with infringing the Municipal Ordinance, as he claimed horse races are a game of chance and are cruel, with no benefits to horse breeding. In 1906, Lukban was the editor of the La Independencia newspaper, a newspaper which pledged for Philippine autonomy.

In January 1907, Lukban ran for the leadership election of the Partido Popular Independista, which urged immediate independence from the United States of America. To prevent further split, Alberto Barretto and Justo Lukban were elected co-leaders of the party. On March 12, 1907, the Union Nacionalista and the Independistas merged to form the Partido Nacionalista. The Nacionalistas split their ranks when Guerrero and Lukban, members of the old Independista group were dropped from the ticket in favor of Dominador Gomez and Felipe del Pan. In 1907, he took part in the elections for the Philippine Assembly, on behalf of the 1st Legislative District of Manila. He lost the elections to Dominador Gomez. Guerrero and Lukban ultimately set up the Liga Nacional Independencia whose sole purpose was to contest the 1907 elections.

Lukban ran for the election of Speaker of the Assembly, but Gomez defeated him by 31 votes. Gomez was found to be a Spanish citizen and a new election for his seat in the 1st Philippine Legislature was called. Gomez still ran in the March 30 special election and defended his seat, beating Lukban by a larger margin of 425 votes. However, on June 18, Gomez resigned his rights to his seat, so a second special election was called. Held on August 11, 1908, Lukban won the special election. At the end of his term in 1909, he was re-elected. However, Gomez successfully challenged the election results in court, because Lukban did not conform to the requirement that a candidate needs to reside within his legislative district. Lukban in turn stepped down on January 26, 1911, and Gomez was declared the true winner of the 1909 election.

On January 16, 1917, Lukban was appointed as the third Mayor of Manila. During his term as mayor, which would last until March 6, 1920, Rizal Avenue and the Jones Bridge were built. Lukban is mostly known as mayor for his attempts to rid Manila of its prostitutes. Following the suggestion of then-House Speaker Sergio Osmeña, he shipped a group of 181 prostitutes to Davao, Mindanao, from October 16–25, 1918. The case caused controversy after the Philippine press wrote about it. In 1920, Governor-General of the Philippines Leonard Wood appointed Lukban to President of the Board of Appeals.

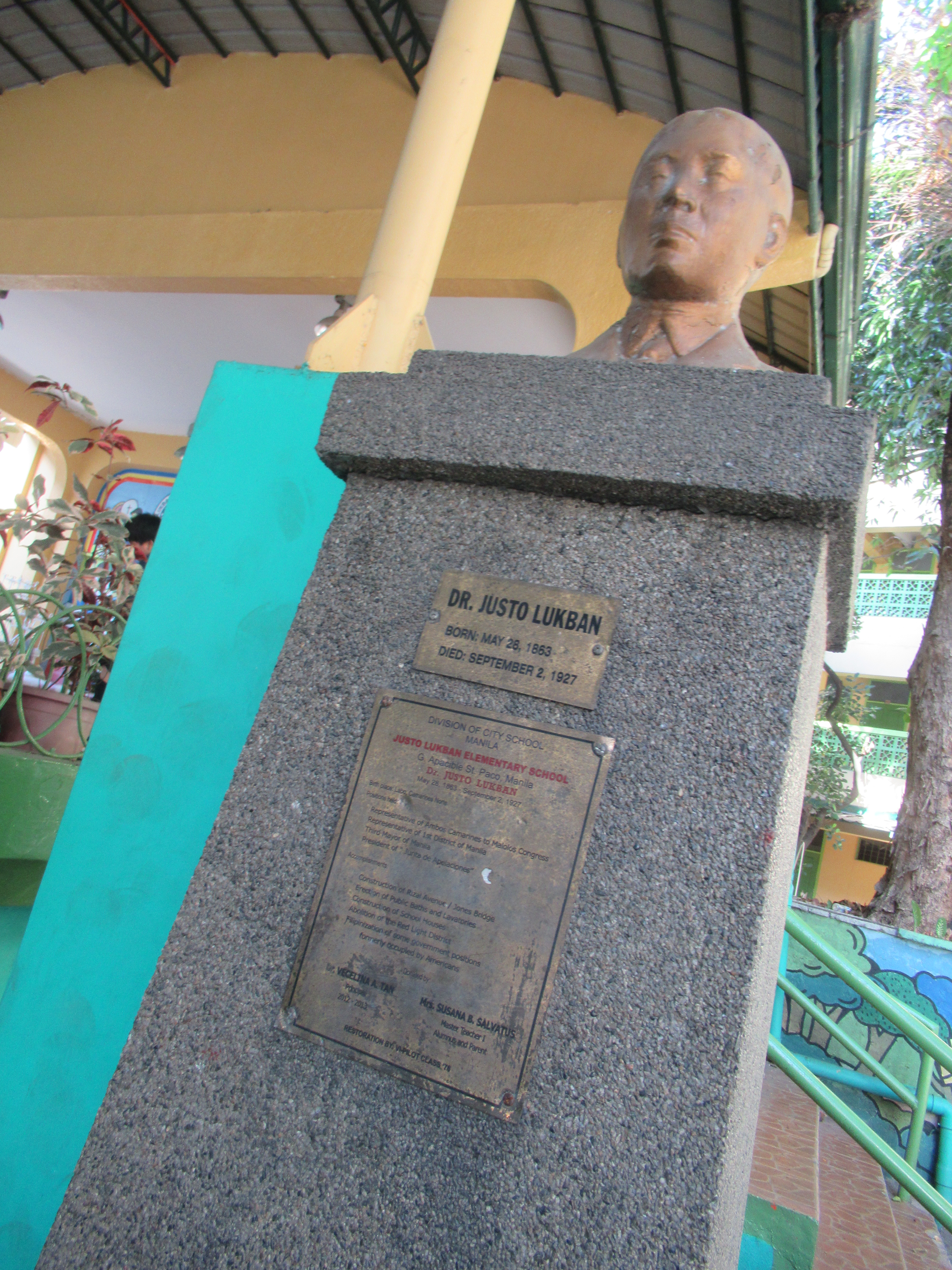
Lucban's monument at Justo Lukban Elementary School (Paco, Manila).

== Later life ==
After his retirement, he stayed with his daughter in Zurbaran Street, Santa Cruz, Manila. Lukban died in on September 2, 1927, at the age of 64, of a heart ailment. He is buried in Manila North Cemetery.

== Sources ==
- Zoilo M. Galang, Encyclopedia of the Philippines, 3 ed. Vol III., E. Floro, Manila (1950)
- Carlos Quirino, Who's who in Philippine history, Tahanan Books, Manila (1995)
