= Siege of Masbate =

- Part of the Philippine Revolution
Date	19 August 1898
Location	Masbate, Philippines
Result	Filipino victory
Territorial changes	Establishment of the revolutionary government in Masbate

Belligerents
Revolutionary Government of the Philippines: Pulajanes	Kingdom of Spain

Commanders and leaders
Riego de Dios; Justo Lukban; Pedro Quipte	Don Luis Cubero

Strength
Unknown; 1 ship	1,000 combined Spanish forces and Native volunteers, 5 gunboats

Casualties and losses
Not	15 killed

The siege of Masbate (Filipino: Pagkubkob sa Masbate; Spanish: Sitio de Masbate) was fought on 19 August 1898, on Masbate Island as a part of the Philippine Revolution.

== Background ==
Before the resumption of the revolution in Luzon, various Visayan provinces had already been in revolt, The Pulajanes became a major threat to Spanish authority at the time. On July 22, 1898, Aguinaldo, in the hopes of establishing the revolutionary government in Visayas sent General Riego de Dios and Justo Lukban to assist in the revolts.

They landed in the harbor only to find the capital town of Masbate in ruins. With the commander in chief, Pedro Quipte, a Pulajan general and his men, who saw the two envoys, preparations began to end the liberation of the province, as it turned out that the Pulajan forces had done their siege to the town and the enemy had fled. It was recommended that the forces be disbanded and a local Philippine Revolutionary Army unit be activated in their place.

== Battle ==
As early as 1 August, the provincial governor of Masbate, Don Luis Cubero y Rojas, planned to leave the island following increased threats of a Pulajanes attack. The Pulajanes movement itself was said to have been established in Malobago in the town of Cataingan, Masbate. Considered as illiterate fanatics by the educated class of Masbate, the Pulajanes failed to get their support and they besieged the main town on the island and laid waste to it, however, the Pulajanes treated as enemies much like the Spaniards people with educational backgrounds, many locals thus defected.

Don Luis Cubero and the remnants of his 1,000 strong army fled the capital on 19 August 1898, soon afterwards, the Pulajanes burned the town to the ground and looted each house before later returning to their bases in Uson. Riego de Dios arrived at the ruined town and met up with Quipte and his men. Later he convinced Quipte to disband the Pulajan movement for he deemed it unnecessary to maintain such a large army in the province, thus the men were ordered to stand down.

== Liberation ==
In the bay of the Masbate, the revolutionary forces had a brief encounter with the Spanish squadron consisting of five gunboats and a brigantine that resulted to the sinking of the Filipino ship Bulusan.

Pedro Quipte, the leader of the Pulahan, did not return to Masbate after Riego de Dios commissioned him to deliver the instruction to the captain of Isabe who was in Cataingan to hide the ship from the enemies. Meanwhile, local governments were set up in the towns along the coast up to Cataingan. The representatives from the revolutionary government were well received in all towns of Masbate, the people showed their willingness and cooperation to establish a new government under the revolutionary government. The provinces of Masbate and Sorsogon were placed under the auspice of General Ananias Diokno who arrived at the end of September in San Pascual in Burias Island. A historic event was witnessed by the local people with the proclamation of the revolutionary government in the town and unfurling of the Filipino flag in the plaza.
