= Dominador Gómez =

Filipino physician, activist, writer, and legislator

The Honourable Dominador Gómez
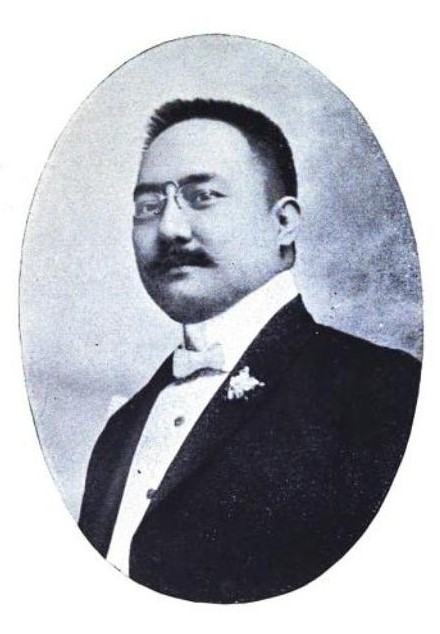
- Gómez as a member of the Philippine Assembly, 1908

Member of the Philippine Assembly from Manila's 1st district
- In office January 26, 1911 – October 16, 1912
- Preceded by: Justo Lukban
- Succeeded by: Isidoro De Santos
- In office October 16, 1907 – February 1, 1908; May 22, 1908 – June 18, 1908
- Preceded by: District created
- Succeeded by: Justo Lukban

President of the Union Obrera Democratica Filipina
- In office 1902–1904
- Preceded by: Isabelo de los Reyes
- Succeeded by: Dissolved

Personal details
- Born: José María Dominador Vicente Gregorio Gómez de Jesús; November 4, 1866 Intramuros, Manila, Captaincy General of the Philippines
- Died: May 14, 1930 (aged 63) Manila, Philippine Islands
- Party: Nacionalista
- Education: Ateneo Municipal; University of Barcelona
- Occupation: Labor leader, writer, politician
- Profession: Physician

Dominador Gómez (born José María Dominador Vicente Gregorio Gómez de Jesús; November 4, 1866 – May 14, 1930) was a Filipino ilustrado nationalist, physician, writer, legislator, and a labor leader.

== Early life ==
Gómez was born in Intramuros, Manila, on November 4, 1866, the son of Jose Maria Gomez y Medel and Lutgardia Basilia De Jesus of Santa Cruz, Manila. In 1881, he obtained his bachelor's degree from Ateneo Municipal. He then took medicine in the University of Santo Tomas, but left for Spain in 1887 to continue his studies. In Spain, he got his license to practice medicine from the University of Barcelona in 1889 and then went to Madrid to get his doctorate. During this time, he was an active member of the propaganda movement. He was a leading member of the Asociacion Hispano-Filipina and a contributor to La Solidaridad. He used the pen name Ramiro Franco.

== Activism ==
After being based in Spain, Gómez, the "flamboyant Spanish mestizo and propagandist," returned to the Philippines six months after the return of fellow ilustrado Isabelo de los Reyes. He succeeded de los Reyes as the head of the Union Obrera Democratica (renamed to Union Obrera Democratica Filipina or UODF) in February 1903. Under his leadership, the UODF launched strikes against American companies in Manila. He was known for delivering fiery speeches against capitalism and imperialism. However, his leadership came to an abrupt halt when he was arrested on May 1, 1903, under charges of sedition and illegal association. The UODF was also accused of aiding the anti-US resistance of Filipino revolutionary Macario Sakay. Following the arrest, Gómez resigned from his position in the UODF. He was sentenced for four years of imprisonment and a year of hard labor, but he was able to gain early freedom by agreeing to help in the negotiations for Sakay's surrender to the American Insular Government in 1906 leading to Sakay's death.

== Politics ==
After Sakay's surrender, Gómez engaged in politics and was elected in the Philippine Assembly from Manila's 1st district in 1907. He was expelled from office on February 1, 1908, with a vote of 40-38 due to “legal controversies”, according to Supreme Court records. However, he later won in the special election on March 30 of the same year, finally only to resign later on June 18.

Gómez ran for re-election in 1909 but initially lost to Justo Lukban. In March 1910, The Philippine Assembly, in a significant move, refused to seat Gomez by denying him the right to represent Manila's 1st district. This decision was a testament to the Assembly's commitment to upholding standards and ensuring the integrity of the electoral process. While there were protests against another member, Jose Clarin, these were ultimately dismissed. It was only in 1911 that he was declared as the true winner as Lukban's election was voided due to his lack of residency. Gómez would serve his term until 1912.

== In popular culture ==
- Portrayed by Nanding Josef in the 1993 film, Sakay.
- Portrayed by Lorenzo Mara in the 2012 film, El Presidente.
- Portrayed by JV Ibesate in Tanghalang Pilipino's 2017 Rock Sarswela, Aurelio Sedisyoso.

== See also ==
- List of members of the Philippine House of Representatives expelled, removed, or suspended

== Sources ==
- William J. Pomeroy. The Philippines: Colonialism, Collaboration, and Resistance.
- Alfred W. McCoy. Policing America's Empire
