= James Francis Smith =

American judge (1859-1928)

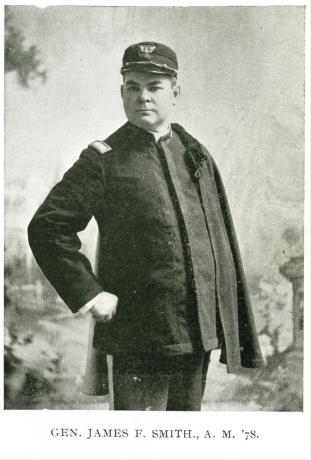

Associate Judge of the United States Court of Customs Appeals
- In office March 30, 1910 – June 29, 1928
- Appointed by: William Howard Taft
- Preceded by: Seat established by 36 Stat. 11
- Succeeded by: Finis J. Garrett

Governor-General of the Philippines
- In office September 20, 1906 – November 11, 1909
- President: Theodore Roosevelt; William Howard Taft
- Preceded by: Henry Clay Ide
- Succeeded by: William Cameron Forbes

4th Associate Justice of the Supreme Court of the Philippines
- In office June 17, 1901 – February 17, 1903
- Appointed by: William McKinley
- Preceded by: Seat established
- Succeeded by: John T. McDonough

5th Philippine Secretary of Public Instruction
- In office January 1, 1902 – September 20, 1906
- Appointed by: Luke Edward Wright
- Preceded by: Bernard Moses
- Succeeded by: William Morgan Shuster

Personal details
- Born: James Francis Smith; January 28, 1859 San Francisco, California
- Died: June 29, 1928 (aged 69) Washington, D.C.
- Education: Santa Clara University (B.S., B.A., M.A.); University of California, Hastings; College of the Law

James Francis Smith (January 28, 1859 – June 29, 1928) was an associate justice of the Supreme Court of the Philippines, Governor-General of the Philippines and an associate judge of the United States Court of Customs Appeals.

== Education and career ==
Born on January 28, 1859, in San Francisco, California, Smith received a Bachelor of Science degree in 1877 from Santa Clara University and received a Bachelor of Arts degree and Master of Arts degree in 1878 from the same institution, then attended the University of California, Hastings College of the Law. He was in private practice in California from 1881 to 1898.

In April 1898, Smith joined the United States Army and served in the Spanish–American War as Colonel of the 1st California Volunteer Infantry Regiment, and participated in the Capture of Guam. He then served in the Philippine–American War, where he served as the Collector of Customs for the Philippine Archipelago in Manila. Following the end of the war, Smith held a number of offices on the Philippine Commission, including Secretary of Public Instruction and Vice-Governor. From 1901 to 1903 he was an Associate Justice of the Supreme Court of the Philippines. He was Governor-General of the Philippines from 1906 to 1909.

Smith's tenure as Governor-General saw the Philippines achieving greater territorial autonomy as and allowing for greater Filipino representation in the government. On March 28, 1907, Smith issued a statement claiming that the people of the Philippines had largely been "law-abiding, peaceful, and loyal to the United States" according to a 1905 census. After the Philippines had held its first democratic elections, he was present at the inauguration of the first Philippine Assembly on October 17, 1907.

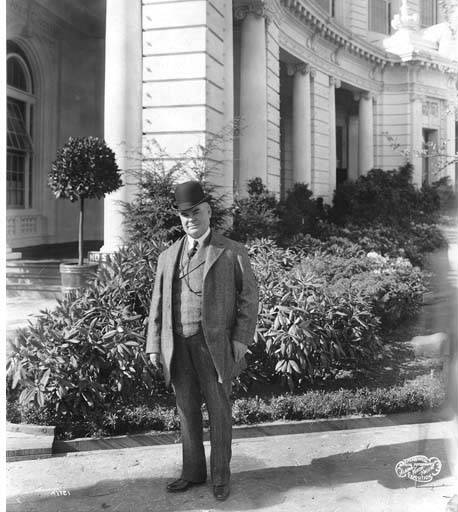
At the Alaska–Yukon–Pacific Exposition in Seattle, 1909

Smith's wife wanted to escape the summertime heat of Manila. So in 1908, he had a mansion in Baguio built as a second official residence. Smith's family became the first residents of the building.

== Federal judicial service ==
Smith was nominated by President William Howard Taft on March 9, 1910, to the United States Court of Customs Appeals (later the United States Court of Customs and Patent Appeals), to a new Associate Judge seat authorized by 36 Stat. 11. He was confirmed by the United States Senate on March 30, 1910, and received his commission the same day. His service terminated on June 29, 1928, due to his death in Washington, D.C.

== Membership ==
Smith was a member of the Native Sons of the Golden West, Alcatraz Parlor No. 145.

== Bibliography ==
- A brief history of the United States Court of Customs and Patent Appeals by Giles S. Rich. Washington, D.C. : Published by authorization of Committee on the Bicentennial of Independence and the Constitution of the Judicial Conference of the United States : U.S. G.P.O., 1980.

== Sources ==
- "Smith, James Francis - Federal Judicial Center". www.fjc.gov.

Legal offices
Preceded by Seat established	Associate Justice of the Supreme Court of the Philippines; 1901–1903	Succeeded by John T. McDonough
Preceded by Seat established by 36 Stat. 11	Associate Judge of the United States Court of Customs Appeals; 1910–1928	Succeeded by Finis J. Garrett
Political offices
Preceded by Henry Clay Ide	Governor-General of the Philippines; 1906–1909	Succeeded by William Cameron Forbes
