= Manila Grand Opera House =

Former opera house in Manila, Philippines

Coordinates: 14°36′19.73″N 120°58′53.63″E

- Teatro Nacional (1900–1902)
- Interactive map of Manila Grand Opera House
- Address: 925 Rizal Avenue corner Doroteo Jose Street; Manila; Philippines
- Type: Opera house

Construction
- Opened: 1902
- Demolished: 1970s

The Manila Grand Opera House (Filipino: Marangal na Bahay-Opera ng Maynila, abbreviated MGOH) was a theater and opera house located in the district of Santa Cruz in Manila on the intersection of Rizal Avenue and Doroteo Jose Street. It was the Philippines' premiere entertainment venue during the American colonial period and the most popular theater in the 1900s. It was also the site of historically significant political meetings. It could entertain crowds of more than 200 people.

It hosted performances by musicians Katy de la Cruz, Bobby Gonzales, Diomedes Maturan, Sylvia La Torre, Pilita Corrales, Elizabeth Ramsey, Bayani Casimiro, the Reycards Duet, and comedy acts Bentot, Chiquito, Lupito, and Pugo and Tugo and Tugak. Plays directed by Lamberto Avellana and Wilfrido Ma. Guerrero were also performed here.

First built in the late-19th century as a circular wooden structure with a nipa roof known as the H.T. Hashim's National Cycle Track, the complex served as the center of Philippine culture and the primary theater for the viewing of plays, movies and zarzuelas in Manila prior to the construction of the Cultural Center of the Philippines in the 1960s.

The complex had undergone several incarnations and name changes before being demolished. A hotel has since been constructed on the site on where the theater once stood.

== History ==
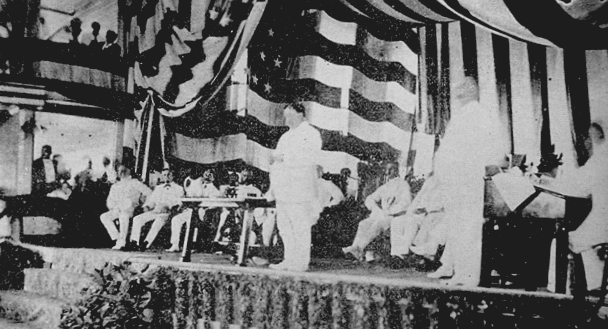
William Howard Taft addressing the audience at the Philippine Assembly in the Manila Grand Opera House.

The Manila Grand Opera House was built in the late-19th century as the H.T. Hashim's National Cycle Track, a circular wooden structure with a nipa roof. In 1900, the name was changed to the Teatro Nacional (National Theater), where the Russian Circus and some American theater companies performed. The name was subsequently changed to the Manila Grand Opera House after a remodeling, extensive expansion of the original theater by L. Balzofiore and its conversion to an opera house in time for the visit of the ‘Compania de Opera Italiana’ in 1902, after the American takeover of the Philippines, and was used as the location of the inauguration of the members of the First Philippine Assembly on October 16, 1907.

It was in Manila Grand Opera House where the Philippines' pioneer symphonic group, the Manila Symphony Society, performed its first concert on January 22, 1926. The purpose of the concert was to raise funds for the building of the Philippine Constabulary Orchestra's music library.

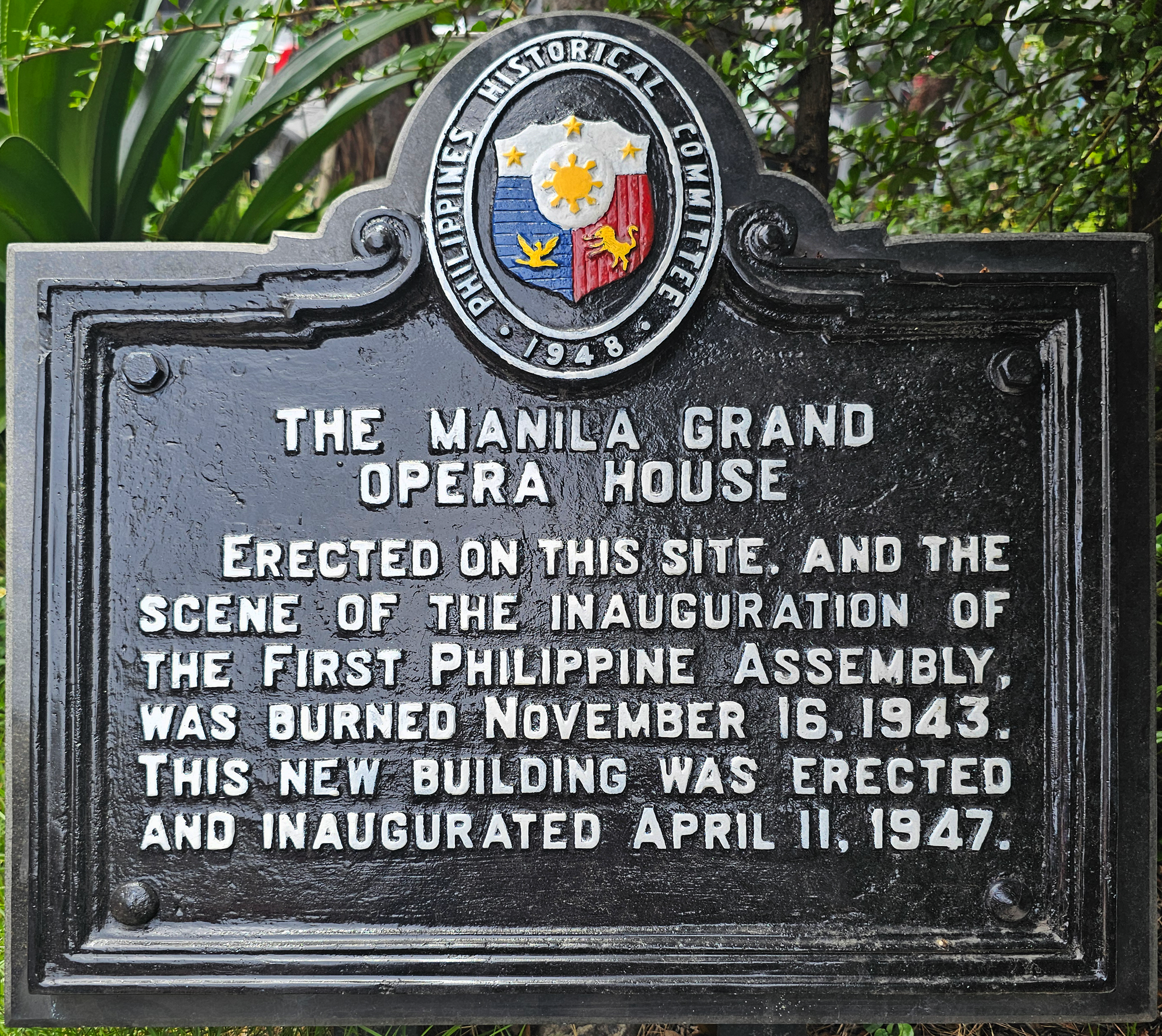
National historical marker installed in 1948 on the site of the opera house

Two important performances in Manila Grand Opera are Claro M. Recto's award-winning dramas La ruta de Damasco and Solo entre las sombras.

Another key event is the convention organized by the socialist and communist parties of the Philippines on November 7, 1938, where both parties officially merged as one, taking the name “Communist Party of the Philippines,” which was later renamed Communist Party of the Philippines-1930 (PKP-1930), in order to avoid confusion with the splinter group of the same name.

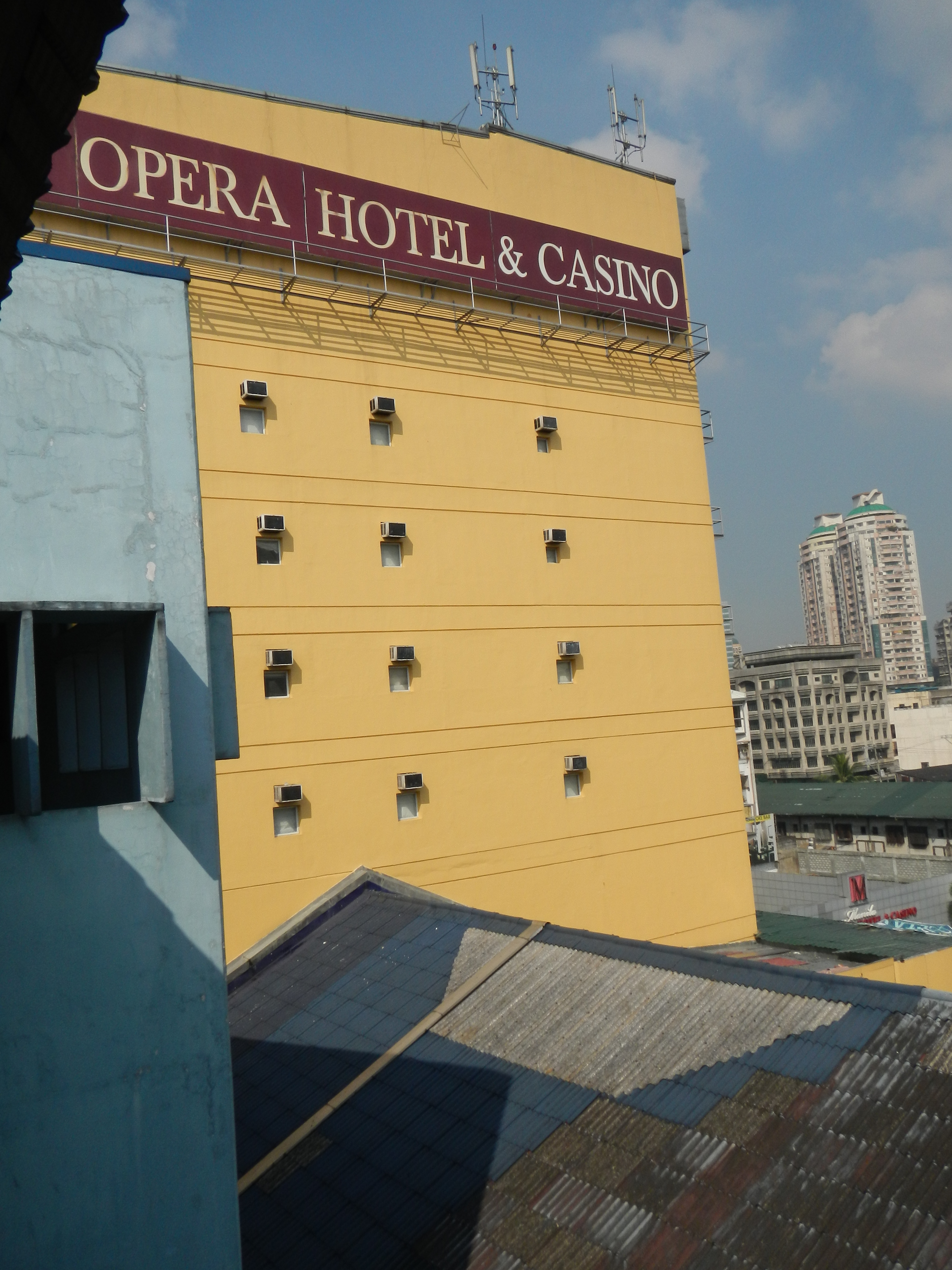
MGOH viewed from Doroteo Jose station

The theater served as the home for theater productions, operas and zarzuelas in the Manila area until the onset of World War II. Toribio Teodoro, then referred to as the "shoe king of the Philippines," acquired the property in 1942 and used the MGOH as his residence during the Japanese occupation and the Second Philippine Republic, at which his house and shoe factory were seized by Japanese forces. Floods and a fire damaged the theater in 1943 and 1944, respectively, with reconstruction efforts commencing after the war.

By the 1950s, the theater, equipped with state-of-the-art equipment for both theatrical and cinematic productions, was dubbed its famous title "The Theater with a History." It provided daily entertainment for Manila residents, charging 85 centavos for admission to one theatrical production and one movie. In addition to plays and movie showings, balagtasan, operas, concerts and bodabil (vaudeville) performances were occasionally staged in the complex. Among the entertainers who performed at the theater in the 1950s were Pilita Corrales, Elizabeth Ramsey, Bayani Casimiro, and Bobby Gonzales.

The theater's decline by the late 1960s has been attributed to the rise of television and cinema.

Ownership of the complex shifted from the heirs of Teodoro to former Philippine Ambassador to Laos Antonio Cabangon Chua in the 1960s, by which then the MGOH had become a cinema. Part of Cabangon Chua's plan for the complex include the construction of a hotel at the complex.

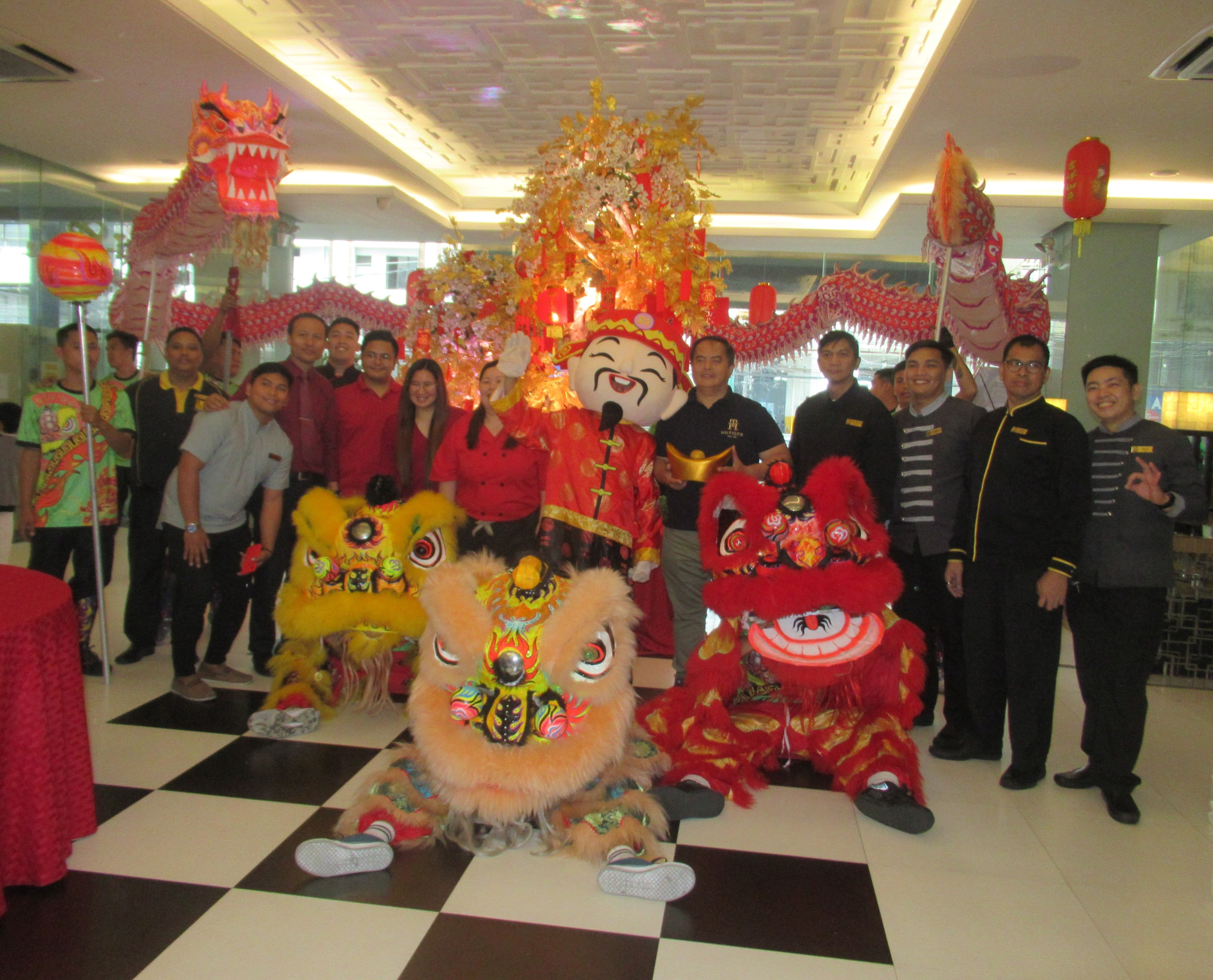
Officers with Lion-Dragon dancers Chinatown Chinese New Year 2024

As economic activity shifted from the Avenida area to Makati in the 1970s, the MGOH was converted into what was then dubbed the largest nightclub in Manila: Chicks O'Clock, catering to the working class near the Avenida area. The continued slump in Avenida eventually forced the closure of the club and the demolition of the theater.

=== Manila Grand Opera Hotel ===
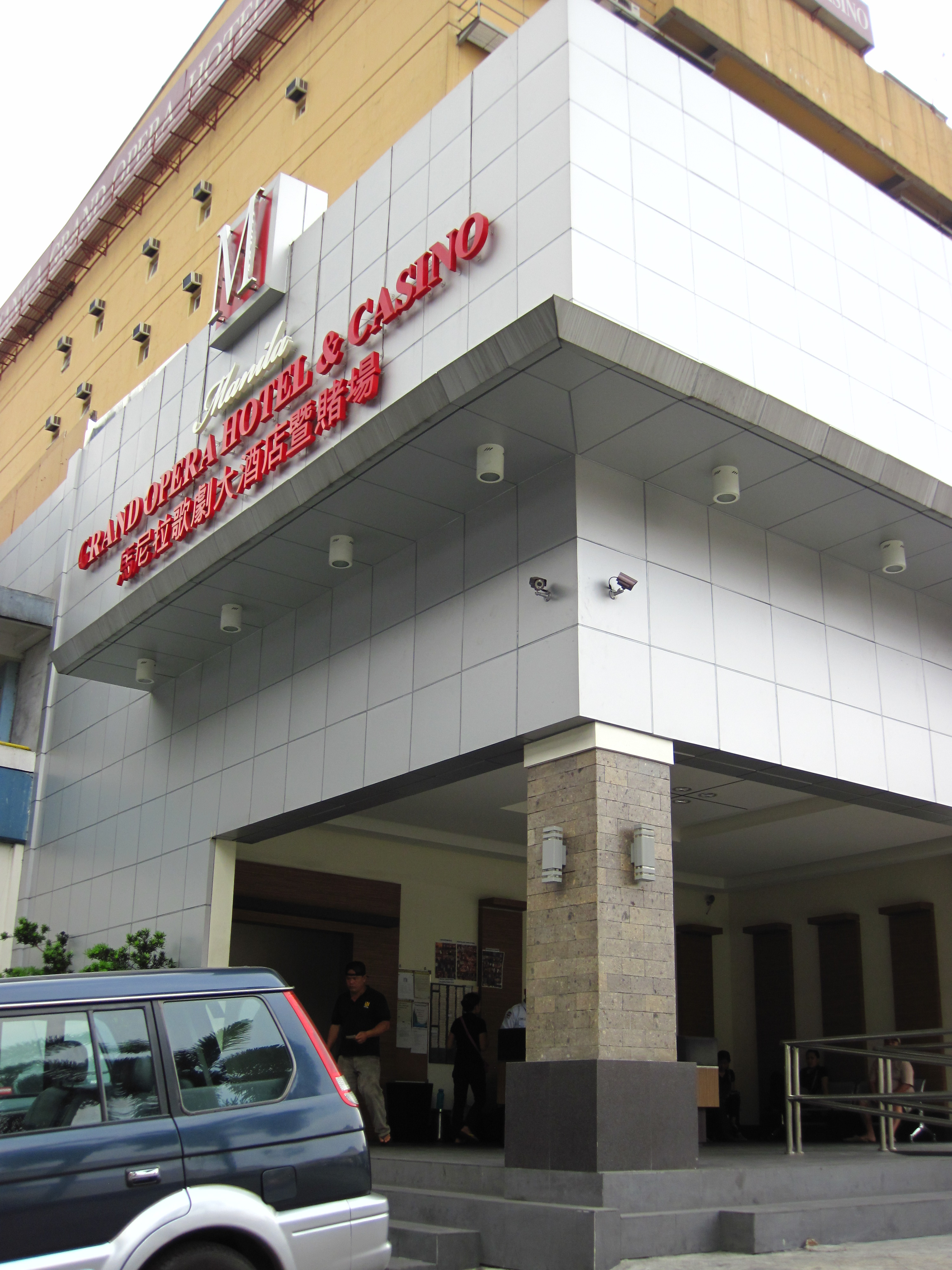
Manila Grand Opera Hotel and Casino

Partially fulfilling Cabangon Chua's vision for the site and as a contribution to the revival of the Avenida area, the Manila Grand Opera Hotel was constructed on the site of the former MGOH. The eight-storey hotel opened in August 2008, with its second building opening sometime in 2009. It will be the only hotel with a direct connection to the LRT Line 1, connecting to Doroteo Jose station, which is also rumored to be constructed on the MGOH grounds.

MGOH's facilities include Ambassador A, B, C, D, E (8th floor), rooms (3rd-7th), casino and KTV bar (mezzanine), business center, meeting room 1, Multi Carats Jewelry shop, Circa 1900 bar and restaurant, New President Sharks Fin Seafood Restaurant, Mister Donut Coffee and swimming pool (1st floor).

== See also ==
- Zorrilla Theater
