= Henry Clay Ide =

American politician and judge (1844–1921)

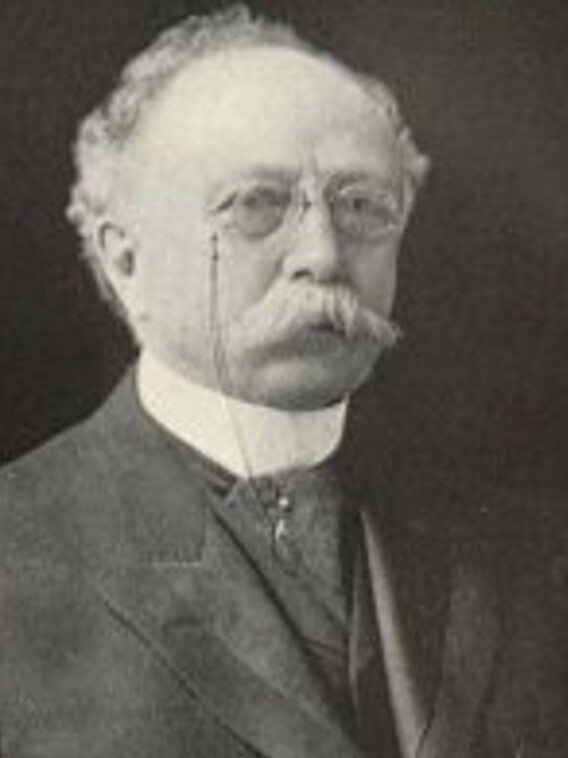

35th United States Minister to Spain
- In office June 9, 1909 – July 8, 1913
- Appointed by: William Howard Taft
- Preceded by: William Miller Collier
- Succeeded by: Joseph Edward Willard

Governor-General of the Philippines
- In office November 3, 1905 – September 19, 1906
- President: Theodore Roosevelt
- Preceded by: Luke Edward Wright
- Succeeded by: James Francis Smith

Vice Governor-General of the Philippines
- In office February 1, 1904 – March 30, 1906
- Preceded by: Luke Edward Wright
- Succeeded by: William Cameron Forbes

Philippine Secretary of Finance and Justice
- In office September 1, 1901 – June 30, 1908
- Preceded by: None (position created)
- Succeeded by: Gregorio S. Araneta

Member of the U.S. Second Philippine Commission
- In office March 16, 1900 – September 19, 1906 Serving with William Howard Taft, Luke Edward Wright, Dean Conant Worcester, Bernard Moses
- Appointed by: William McKinley
- Preceded by: None (position created)
- Succeeded by: William Morgan Shuster

Personal details
- Born: September 18, 1844 Barnet, Vermont
- Died: June 13, 1921 (aged 76) St. Johnsbury, Vermont
- Resting place: Mount Pleasant Cemetery, St. Johnsbury, Vermont
- Party: Republican
- Spouse: Mary M. Melcher (1844-1892) (m. 1871)
- Children: 4
- Education: Dartmouth College
- Profession: Attorney

Henry Clay Ide (September 18, 1844 – June 13, 1921) was a U.S. judge, colonial commissioner, ambassador, and Governor-General of the Philippines.

== Biography ==
=== Early life, States Attorney, Senator, and Presidential Commissioner to Samoa ===
Ide was born in Barnet, Vermont, on September 18, 1844, a son of Jacob and Lodoiska (Knights) Ide. He attended high school at the St. Johnsbury Academy and graduated from Dartmouth College in 1866, where he was named valedictorian. He was principal of the St. Johnsbury Academy from 1866 to 1868, and led Cotting High School in Arlington, Massachusetts during the 1869 school year. He studied law, first with Benjamin H. Steele, and later with Jonathan Ross, and was admitted to the bar in 1871. He practiced law in St. Johnsbury, Vermont from 1871 until 1891, and was the partner of Wendell Phillips Stafford. Among the prospective attorneys who studied law in their office was William H. Taylor, who later served as an Associate Justice of the Vermont Supreme Court.

A Republican, Ide was State's Attorney for Caledonia County from 1876 to 1878. He was then a member of the Vermont Senate from 1882 to 1885.

President Benjamin Harrison appointed Ide Presidential Commissioner to Samoa in 1891. The formal title of the post was American Land Commissioner in Samoa, one of three representatives (of the United States, Germany, and Great Britain) responsible for adjudicating land claims by foreigners in the islands, as provided for in the Treaty of Berlin (1889). Ide reached Apia on May 16, 1891, but only held the office for six months, until he resigned because of a serious illness in his family and left the islands on November 12, 1891. Robert Louis Stevenson wrote to him two days beforehand, saying "I hear with great regret of your departure. They say there are as good fish in the sea as ever came out of it, but I doubt if they will come to our hook. It is not only that you have shown so much capacity, moderation, tact, and temper; but you have had the talent to make these gifts recognized and appreciated among our very captious population. For my part, I always thought your presence the best thing that the treaty had brought us."

Ide returned to the islands in 1893 as Chief Justice, another position provided for by the Treaty of Berlin. He accepted the appointment in August, and sailed for the islands two months later. As Chief Justice, Ide presided over trials of both native Samoans and foreign nationals of the three Treaty of Berlin signatories. He also had the power to recommend criminal and taxation legislation to the government of Samoa. He resigned in 1896, but there was a delay in the arrival of his successor, requiring him to continue in office until 1897. At his departure, the Samoa Weekly Herald editorialized that Ide had been a just and able judge. Similarly, King Malietoa told Ide that "You will not be forgotten in Samoa, you will be remembered as the good Chief Justice who knew our ways and laws and customs and who was kind to us".

Ide was succeeded as Land Commissioner and Chief Justice by William Lea Chambers.

=== Presidential Commissioner to the Philippines ===
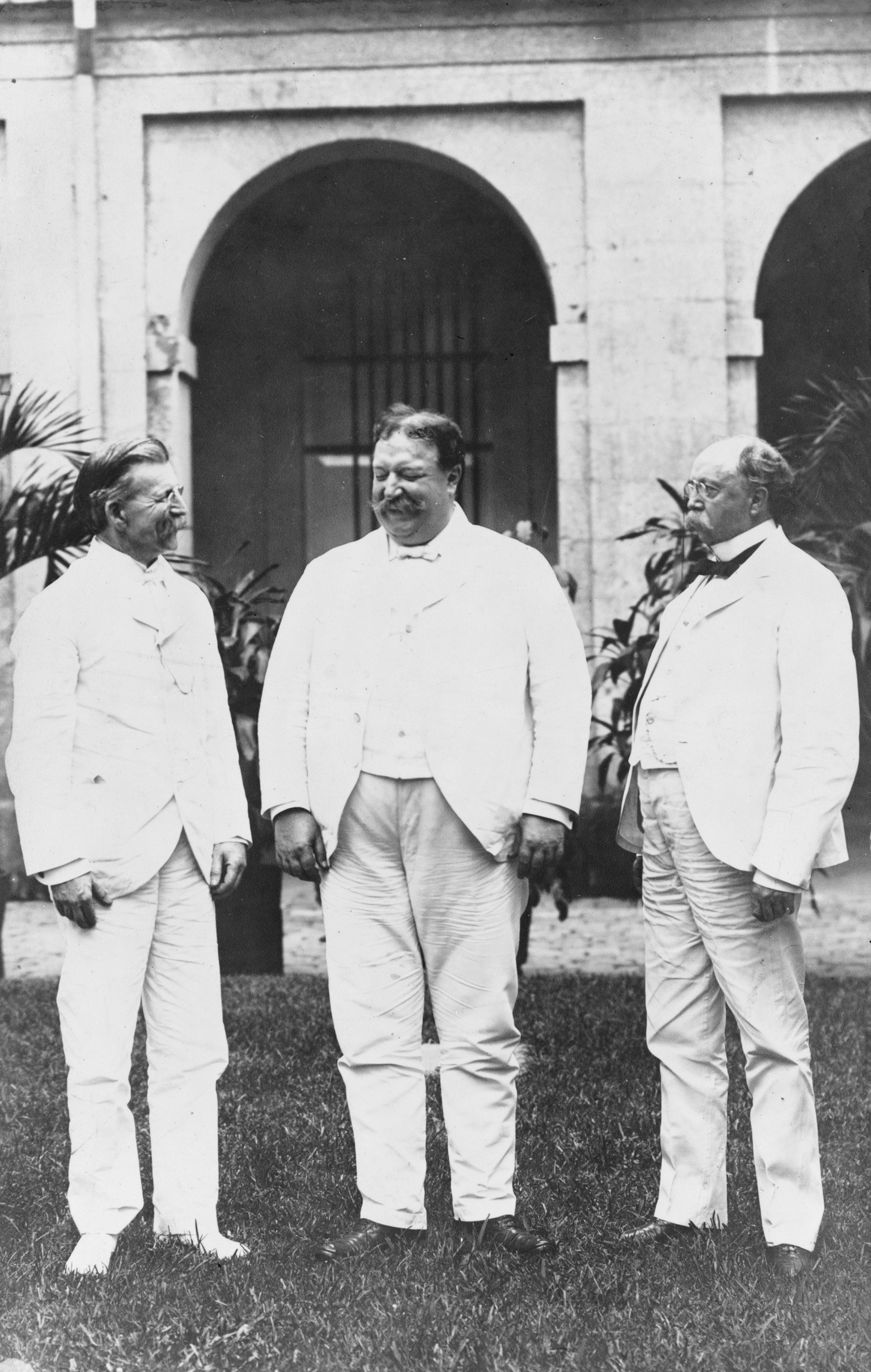
Ide (at right) along with two fellow Philippine Commissioners Luke Edward Wright (left), and William Howard Taft (centre), in 1901

Ide was one of the Commissioners of the Taft Commission, appointed in 1900. Like the other Commissioners, he arrived in the Philippines in June of that year, and assumed official legislative power on September 1, 1900.

In 1901, Ide and the other commissioners gained executive power when they were appointed to the cabinet of territorial Governor William Howard Taft. Ide was appointed Secretary of Finance and Justice, and served until 1904.

Ide was appointed Vice-Governor of the Philippines in 1904. In November 1905 he became Acting Governor General after Luke Wright, then Governor General, took leave. Wright formally resigned in April 1906, and Ide formally succeeded him Governor-General.

Ide was Governor-General until September, when he resigned and was recalled to Washington D.C. In part, Ide's few months as Governor-General were a political face-saving exercise (as was Wright's resignation). Taft had visited the Philippines in August 1905, and after that visit that Taft intended major changes to the Philippine Commission. Wright and Ide were two of the Commissioners he intended to replace, and allowing Wright to resign and Ide to serve briefly as Governor-General were seen by contemporary observers as face-saving moves. The issue Taft sought to solve was a conflict between the Commission members and the Federalistas. The Federalistas disagreed with and disliked both Wright and Ide. However, while they found Wright's Governor-Generalship outright offensive, they were happier with Ide's ten months in office. Hailing his resignation from office, La Democracia (as quoted in the September 5, 1906 Manila Times) praised Ide and his work, and stated that "in his social relations, Mr. Ide has reestablished the good times of Taft, which the latter's successor tried to make us forget".

=== Ambassador ===
Ide served as minister to Spain from 1909 to 1913.

=== Family, personal life, and business affairs ===
On October 26, 1871, Ide married Mary M. Melcher, daughter of Joseph and Sophia Melcher of Stoughton, Massachusetts. They had four children before her death in 1892: Adelaide (Addie) M., Annie L., Harry J., and Mary M.

During his time on Samoa, Ide became friends with Robert Louis Stevenson, who was heavily engaged in the politics of the region and a frequent commentator on Samoan affairs to the world at large. One day, Ide mentioned to Stevenson the feelings of his daughter Annie about having been born on Christmas Day and so having no birthday celebration separate from the family's Christmas celebrations. Stevenson drew up a formal deed of gift, properly sealed and witnessed as a legal document, and then published in the press, donating his birthday to Ide's daughter. The daughter and Stevenson corresponded further on the matter in November 1891, with Stevenson assuring her that "I am sure [your father] will tell you this is sound law." The affair was the root of a strong bond between the Ide and Stevenson families.

Anne H. Ide, who was known as "Levei-malo" to the Samoans, married William Bourke Cockran in 1906, becoming his third wife. In 1912, his daughter Marjorie married Shane Leslie, a first cousin of Winston Churchill.

== Death ==
Ide died in St. Johnsbury, Vermont on 13 June 1921. His body was buried at Mount Pleasant Cemetery in St. Johnsbury.

Political offices
| Preceded by Luke E. Wright | Governor-General of the Philippines; 1905–1906 | Succeeded by James Francis Smith |
Diplomatic posts
| Preceded by William Miller Collier | U.S. Minister to Spain; 1909–1913 | Succeeded by Joseph E. Willard |
