= Philippine Assembly =

Lower house of the Philippine Legislature from 1907 to 1916

Type
- Type: Lower house of the Philippine Legislature

History
- Founded: October 16, 1907
- Disbanded: October 16, 1916
- Preceded by: Philippine Commission
- Succeeded by: House of Representatives of the Philippines
- Seats: 80 (1907-1909), 81 (1909-1916), 90 (1916)

Meeting place
- Manila Grand Opera House (1907), Ayuntamiento de Manila (1907-1916)

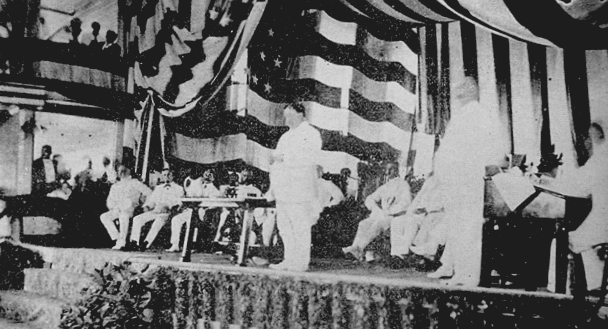
William Howard Taft addressing the First Philippine Assembly in the Manila Grand Opera House.

Plaque where the Manila Grand Opera House used to stand, site of the inauguration of the assembly.

The Philippine Assembly (sometimes called the Philippine National Assembly) was the lower house of the Philippine Legislature from 1907 to 1916, when it was renamed the House of Representatives of the Philippines. The Philippine Assembly was the first national legislative body fully chosen by elections in the history of the Philippines.

The Assembly was created by the 1902 Philippine Organic Act of the United States Congress, which established the Insular Government of the Philippines. Along with an upper house (the appointed Philippine Commission), it formed the bicameral Philippine Legislature during the American colonial period. In 1916, the Jones Act replaced the Philippine Organic Act and the Assembly became the current House of Representatives of the Philippines.

The first Philippine Assembly elections were held on July 30, 1907. These were the first nationwide elections ever held in the Philippines. The Assembly was inaugurated on October 16, 1907 with Sergio Osmeña as Speaker of the Assembly, Manuel L. Quezon as majority leader, and Vicente Singson as minority leader.

The inauguration of the assembly marked a "turning point in the country’s history, for its creation marked the commencement of Filipino participation in self-governance and a big leap towards self-determination."

== History ==
The United States of America gained control of the Philippines following the 1898 Spanish–American War and the subsequent Philippine–American War. In 1902, the United States Congress passed the first organic act for the Philippines, the Philippine Organic Act, which acted like a constitution from 1902 until it was replaced by the Jones Act of 1916. When the act was passed in 1902, the appointed Governor-General to the Philippines, William Howard Taft, envisioned that the Assembly would improve Philippine-American relations, and prepare the Filipinos for eventual self-rule. President Theodore Roosevelt hesitated to grant the Philippines greater authority and viewed the Assembly as more of an experiment rather than a true step toward Philippine autonomy.

=== First nationwide elections ===
In accordance with the Philippine Organic Act, the Philippine Commission conducted a census in 1903, published on March 25, 1905. Two years after the census' publication, on July 30, 1907, the first Assembly elections were held, the first nationwide elections in the Philippines. Although several parties and independent candidates ran for the Assembly, two political parties dominated, the Nacionalista Party and the Progresista Party. The Nacionalista Party, which was in favor of "immediate and complete independence" from the United States and was led by future President Sergio Osmeña, captured a majority of the 80-seat Assembly.

=== First Philippine Legislature ===
On October 16, 1907, the Philippine Assembly was inaugurated at the Manila Grand Opera House. The event was attended both by Taft (then Secretary of War of the United States), and the new Governor-General James Francis Smith. The Assembly's rules and organization was modeled on those of the United States House of Representatives.

While the candidates representing the Nacionalistas won the majority of the seats in the assembly, the maneuvering to the election for the Speaker of the Assembly began, as the Speaker would be the most powerful Filipino in government. Quezon and Osmeña focused on aggregating the delegates around Osmeña's leadership, a task that became easier than the two had anticipated. With less than two dozen delegates, the Progresistas were not able to elect a Speaker from their ranks and were marginalized from the talks amongst the Nacionalistas. Osmeña found two opponents for the Speakership: Gomez who defeated Justo Lukban by 31 votes, and Pedro Paterno. However, Gomez's citizenship was questioned, and Paterno found himself to be Osmeña's leading opponent.

It was proved that Gomez was a Spanish citizen and a new election for his seat was called. Gomez still ran in the election and beat Lukban by a larger margin, about 400 votes. Gomez was permitted to take his seat, but not after seven months has passed, and after Osmeña was elected Speaker on October 16, 1907, with Quezon as the majority floor leader.

The defeat of the Progresistas in the elections hastened their downfall; the Nacionalista Party will continue to dominate the elections for the legislature, and the Progresistas, and later their successor the Democratas, will remain in opposition.

The First Philippine Assembly is best remembered to reigniting efforts towards independence and for improving education in the Philippines.

== Election, qualifications, and responsibility of members ==
In the first 1907 election, 80 members were elected in a first past the post electoral system. In subsequent elections, 81 members were elected. There were three elections: in 1907, in 1909, and in 1912.

== Reorganization under the Jones Law of 1916 ==
Under the Jones Law of 1916, and following elections to both houses, a bicameral legislature composed exclusively of Filipinos was inaugurated on October 16, 1916. The Philippine Commission was replaced by the elected Senate of the Philippines and the Assembly became the House of Representatives of the Philippines.
