= Revolutionary Government of the Philippines =

Temporary government established in the Philippine Islands

Revolutionary Government of the Philippines Gobierno Revolucionario de Filipinas (Spanish) Pamahalaang Pamhimagsikan ng Pilipinas (Tagalog)
- 1898–1899
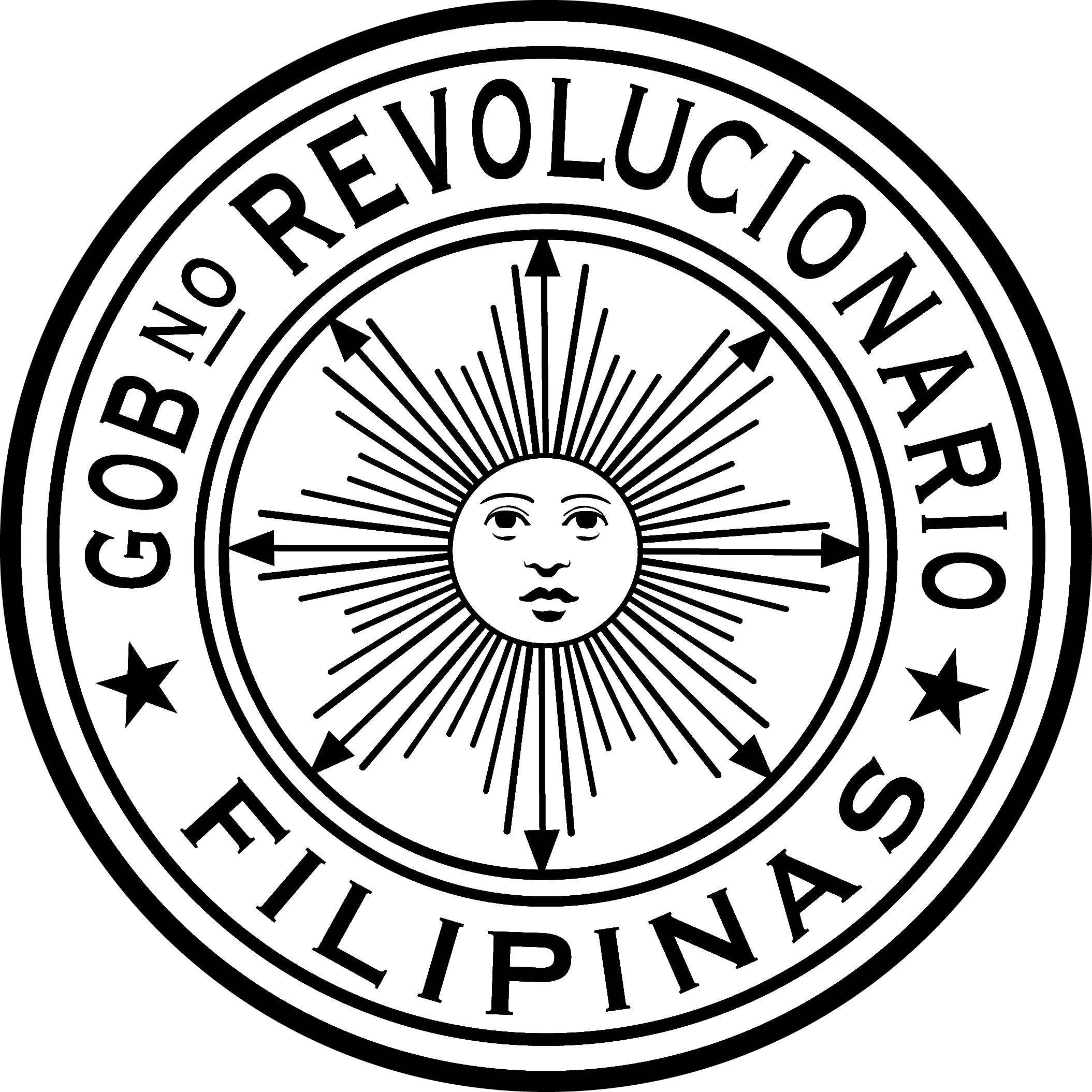
- Flag Coat of arms
- Anthem: Marcha Nacional Filipina (English: "Philippine National March") (Note: The original title was "Marcha Filipina-Magdalo" (Philippine-Magdalo March), and was later changed to "Marcha Nacional Filipina" (Philippine National March) upon its adoption as the national anthem of the First Philippine Republic on June 11, 1898, a day before independence was to be proclaimed.)
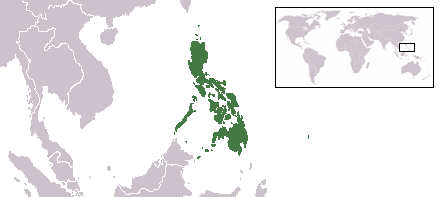
- Territory claimed by the Revolutionary Government of the Philippines in Asia
- Status: Unrecognized state
- Capital: Bacoor (June 1898 – August 1898); Malolos (August 1898 – January 1899)
- Common languages: Spanish, Tagalog
- Religion: Roman Catholicism, Islam, Indigenous Philippine folk religions
- Government: Unitary revolutionary republic
- President
  - 1898–1899: Emilio Aguinaldo
- President of the Cabinet
  - 1899: Apolinario Mabini
- Legislature: None (rule by decree) (June 23 – September 15, 1898); Malolos Congress (from 1898)
- Historical era: Philippine Revolution
  - Established: June 23, 1898
  - Mock Battle of Manila: August 13, 1898
  - Spanish cession: December 10, 1898
  - Republic proclaimed: January 23, 1899
- Currency: Philippine peso
Preceded by	Succeeded by
Captaincy General of the Philippines; Dictatorial Government of the Philippines	First Philippine Republic

The Revolutionary Government of the Philippines (Spanish: Gobierno Revolucionario de Filipinas) was a revolutionary government established in the Spanish East Indies on June 23, 1898, during the Spanish–American War, by Emilio Aguinaldo, its initial and only president. The government succeeded a dictatorial government that had been established by Aguinaldo on June 18 and was dissolved and replaced by this government upon its establishment. This government endured until January 23, 1899, when the proclamation of the Malolos Constitution established an insurgent Philippine Republic government that replaced it.

Four governmental departments were initially created, each having several bureaus: foreign relations, marine, and commerce; war and public works; police, justice, instruction, and hygiene; finance, agriculture, and industry. A revolutionary congress was established with power "[t]o watch over the general interest of the Philippine people, and carrying out of the revolutionary laws; to discuss and vote upon said laws; to discuss and approve, prior to their ratification, treaties and loans; to examine and approve the accounts presented annually by the secretary of finance, as well as extraordinary and other taxes which may hereafter be imposed."

On August 14, 1898, two days after the Battle of Manila of the Spanish–American War and about two months after Aguinaldo's proclamation of this revolutionary government, the United States established a military government in the Philippines, with General Merritt acting as military governor.

== Government ==
=== Cabinet ===
Aguinaldo appointed a cabinet on 15 June 1898 during the preceding governmental arrangement; following the establishment of the Revolutionary Government on 23 June, its administrative organization was incorporated into the new government. His appointment includes Baldomero Aguinaldo as secretary of war and public works, Leanardo Ibarra as secretary of the interior and Mariano Trías as secretary of finance; the secretaryship of foreign relations, marine, and commerce was provisionally left in the charge of the presidency. On September 23, the cabinet was reorganized to six departments.

On January 2, 1899, when it became certain that Cayetano Arellano would not accept the role of secretary of foreign relations, the role fell to Apolinario Mabini. Mabini had to that time been Aguinaldo's principal advisor and he was also named the president of the cabinet.

Cabinet of the Revolutionary Government of the Philippines
Department	Secretary	Term
President of the Cabinet	Apolinario Mabini	January 2, 1899 – May 7, 1899
Secretary of War and Public Works	Baldomero Aguinaldo	June 15, 1898 – May 7, 1899
Secretary of the Interior	Leonardo Ibarra	June 15, 1898 – January 2, 1899
Secretary of Foreign Affairs	Cayetano Arellano	September 23, 1898 – January 2, 1899
Secretary of Foreign Affairs	Apolinario Mabini	January 2, 1899 – May 7, 1899
Secretary of Treasury/Finance	Mariano Trías	June 15, 1898 – May 7, 1899
Secretary of Justice	Gregorio Araneta	September 23, 1898 – May 7, 1899
Secretary of Welfare (Note: including Public Instruction, Public Works, Communications, Agriculture, Industry, and Commerce)	Fernando Canon	September 23, 1898 – January 2, 1899
Secretary of Welfare	Gracio Gonzaga	January 2, 1899 – May 7, 1899

== Provincial and district administration ==
By October 1898, the Revolutionary Government had established a hierarchy of provincial and local officials in territories subject to its authority, establishing leadership in the provinces of Manila, Cavite, Tarlac, Morong, Batangas, Bataan, Pampanga, Bulacan, Pangasinan, La Laguna, Infanta, Nueva Ecija, Marinduque, Tayabas and the District of Amburayan.

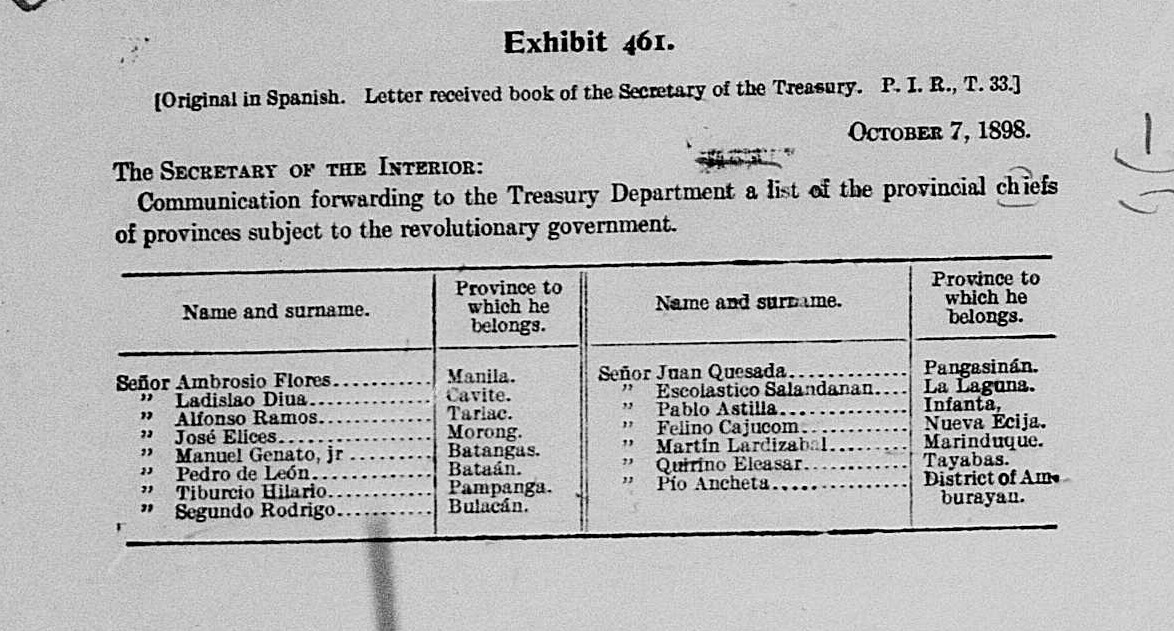
Exhibit 461: Communication forwarding to the Treasury Department a list of the provincial chiefs of provinces subject to the revolutionary government.

== Bibliography ==
- Duka, Cecilio D. (2008). Struggle for Freedom' 2008 Ed. Rex Bookstore, Inc. ISBN 978-971-23-5045-0.
- Elliott, Charles Burke (1917). The Philippines: To the End of the Commission Government, a Study in Tropical Democracy (PDF).
- Guevara, Sulpico ed. 1972. The Laws of the First Philippine Republic (The Laws of Malalos). National Historical Institute, Manila., (published online 2005, University of Michigan Library)
- Halstead, Murat (1898). The Story of the Philippines and Our New Possessions, Including the Ladrones, Hawaii, Cuba and Porto Rico.
- Kalaw, Maximo Manguiat (1927). The Development of Philippine Politics. Oriental commercial.
