= First Philippine Republic =

Self-proclaimed independent republic, 1899–1901

Philippine Republic República Filipina (Spanish) Republikang Pilipino (Tagalog)
- 1899–1901 (de jure) or 1902 (de facto) (Note: The de jure ending date that this article uses is April 19, 1901, the date its president, Emilio Aguinaldo, signed a manifesto calling on his countrymen to give up the fight, as the ending date of the First Philippine Republic. Some de jure ending dates seen in other sources are: March 23, 1901, the date of Aguinaldo's capture by U.S. forces; and April 1, 1901, the date Aguinaldo took an oath of allegiance to the U.S. This article uses the de facto ending date of April 16, 1902, the date General Miguel Malvar, who continued to fight and is seen by some as having unofficially taken up the presidency after Aguinaldo's capture, was captured; while other sources use July 4, 1902, the date of the full amnesty for those who had participated in the war was proclaimed by U.S. President Theodore Roosevelt through the Philippine Organic Act.)
- Flag Emblem
- Motto: Libertad, Justicia, y Igualdad (English: "Liberty, Justice, and Equality") (Tagalog: "Kalayaan, Katarungan, at Pagkakapantay-pantay")
- Anthem: Marcha Nacional Filipina (English: "Philippine National March")
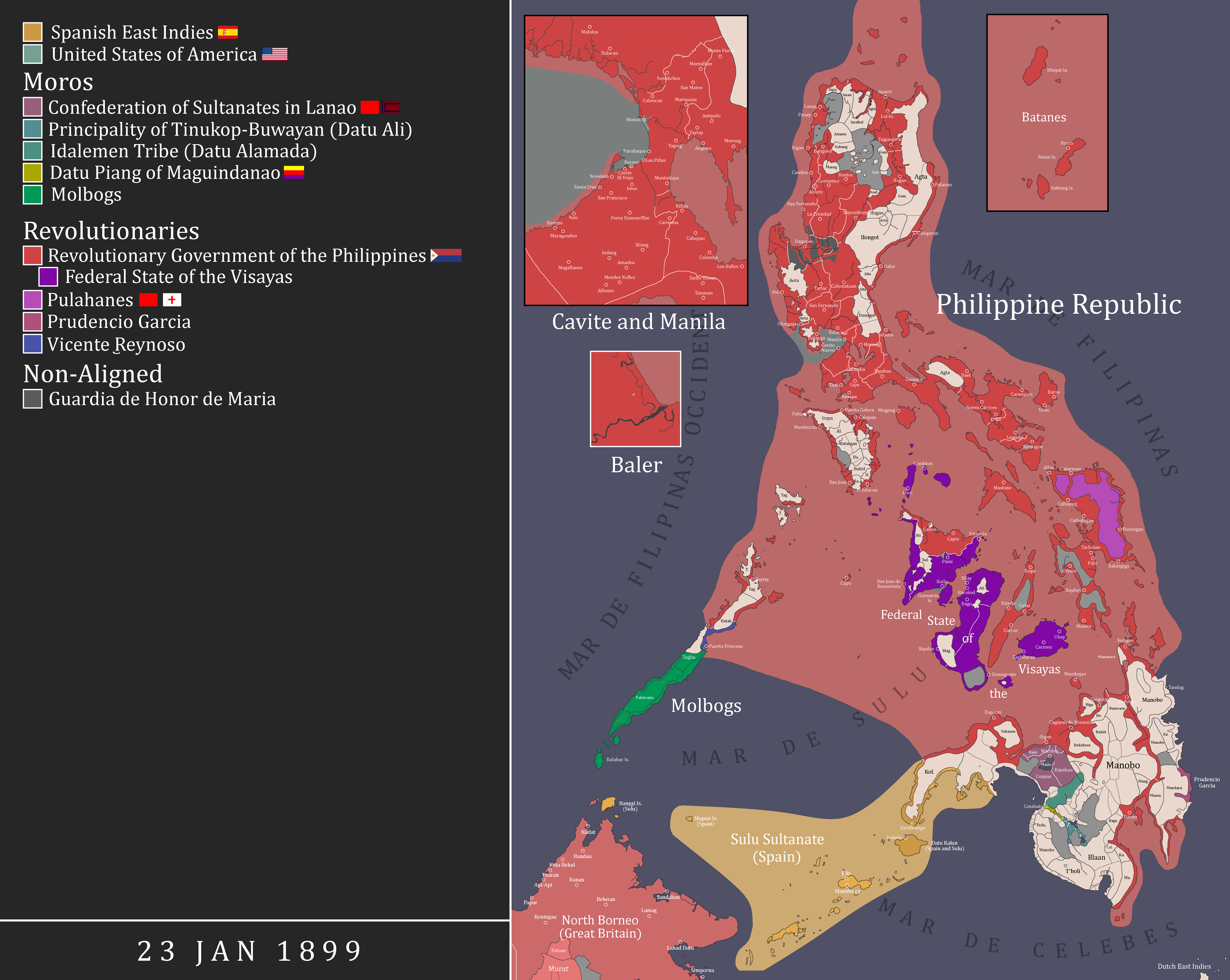
- Territory controlled by the Philippine Republic, most of which it occupied except Manila and parts of Mindanao.
- Status: Unrecognized state
- Capital: Malolos (Note: The capital (Malolos) was held by enemy forces from March 31, 1899. There were numerous temporary capitals.)
- Largest city: Manila (until February 5, 1899)
- Official languages: Spanish (Note: Article 93 of the Malolos Constitution specifies that the Spanish language shall temporarily be used until laws regulating language usage are promulgated.)
- Common languages: Philippine languages
- Religion: Secular state Majority: Roman Catholicism with folk elements Minority: Indigenous religion, Sunni Islam
- Demonym: Filipino
- Government: Republic
- President
  - 1899–1901: Emilio Aguinaldo (first)
  - 1901–1902: Miguel Malvar (last; unofficial)
- Prime Minister
  - 1899: Apolinario Mabini (first)
  - 1899: Pedro Paterno (last)
- Legislature: National Assembly
- Historical era: Philippine–American War
  - Republic proclaimed: January 23, 1899 (Note: January 23, 1899 was the date of Aguinaldo's inauguration as president of the First Philippine Republic under the Malolos Constitution. He had held positions as president of the revolutionary government from March 22, 1897, to November 2, 1897, president of the Biak-na-Bato Republic from November 2, 1897, to December 20, 1897, head of a dictatorial government from May 24, 1898, to June 23, 1898, and president of another revolutionary government from June 23, 1898, to January 22, 1899.)
  - De jure dissolution: 19 April 1901
  - De facto dissolution: 16 April 1902

Area
- 1898: 298,719 km^{2} (115,336 sq mi)

Population
  - 1898: 7,832,719
- Currency: Peso
Preceded by	Succeeded by
Revolutionary Government of the Philippines	Insular Government of the Philippine Islands

The Philippine Republic (Spanish: República Filipina), retroactively known as the First Philippine Republic or the Malolos Republic, was an unrecognized state established in Malolos, Bulacan, during the Philippine Revolution against the Spanish Empire (1896–1898) through the promulgation of the Malolos Constitution on January 23, 1899, succeeding the Revolutionary Government of the Philippines. Emilio Aguinaldo was its inaugural president. It was not recognized by any foreign power, but remained a de facto government. Following the American victory at the Battle of Manila Bay, Aguinaldo returned to the Philippines, issued the Philippine Declaration of Independence on June 12, 1898, and proclaimed successive revolutionary Philippine governments on June 18 and 23 of that year, under which regimes the liberation of Philippine territory from Spain was conducted.

In December 1898, Spain and the United States signed the 1898 Treaty of Paris, ending the Spanish–American war. As part of the treaty, Spain ceded its claim to the Philippines to the United States. The treaty was not considered as in effect until April 11, 1899, when mutual ratifications were exchanged. The Revolutionary Government considered the treaty invalid, and in the meantime had been drafting a republican constitution to succeed its current regime. On January 21, 1899, the Malolos Constitution was promulgated, and the Republic was inaugurated on January 23. On February 4, fighting erupted in Manila between American and Filipino forces in what developed into the Philippine–American War. (Note: The First Philippine Republic officially declared war against the United States on June 2, 1899.. The United States considered this an insurrection against the U.S. military government it had established on August 14 following the Spanish surrender of Manila.) Aguinaldo was captured by the American forces on March 23, 1901, in Palanan, Isabela, and he declared allegiance to the U.S. on April 19, 1901, effectively ending the Philippine Republic.

The First Philippine Republic is sometimes characterized as the first proper constitutional republic in Asia, although there were several Asian republics predating it – for example, the Mahajanapadas of ancient India, the Lanfang Republic, the Republic of Formosa, or the Republic of Ezo. Aguinaldo himself had led a number of governments prior to Malolos, like those established at Tejeros and Biak-na-Bato which both styled themselves República de Filipinas ("Republic of the Philippines"). Unlike the founding documents of those governments, however, the Malolos Constitution was drafted and approved by a partially elected congress and called for a true representative democracy.

== History ==
=== Background ===
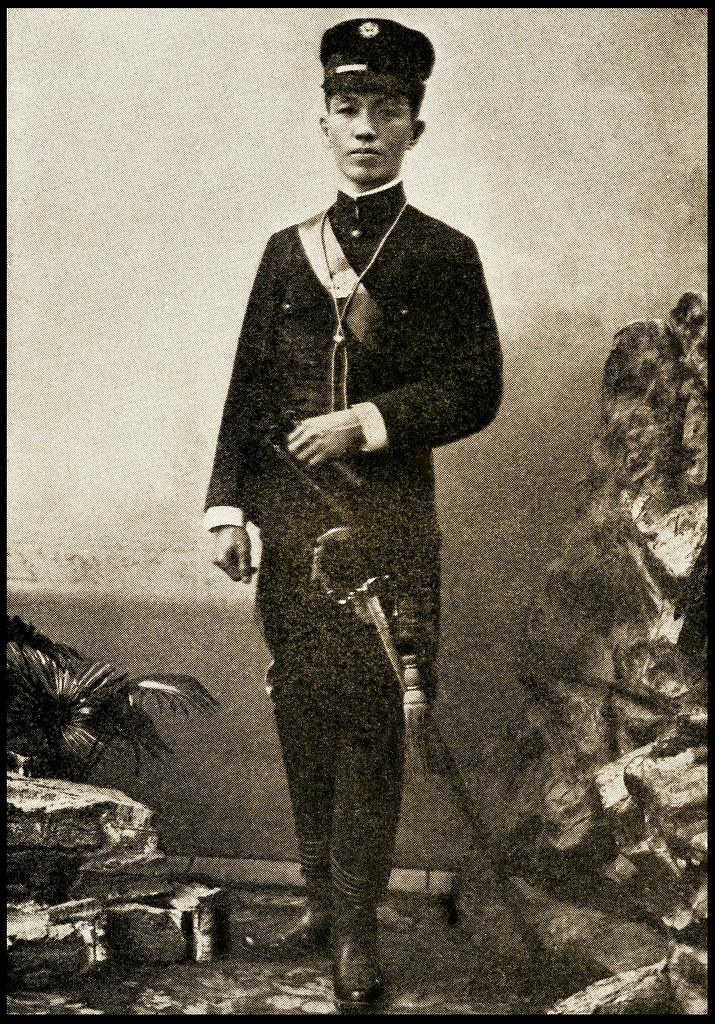
First President of the Philippines, Emilio Aguinaldo.

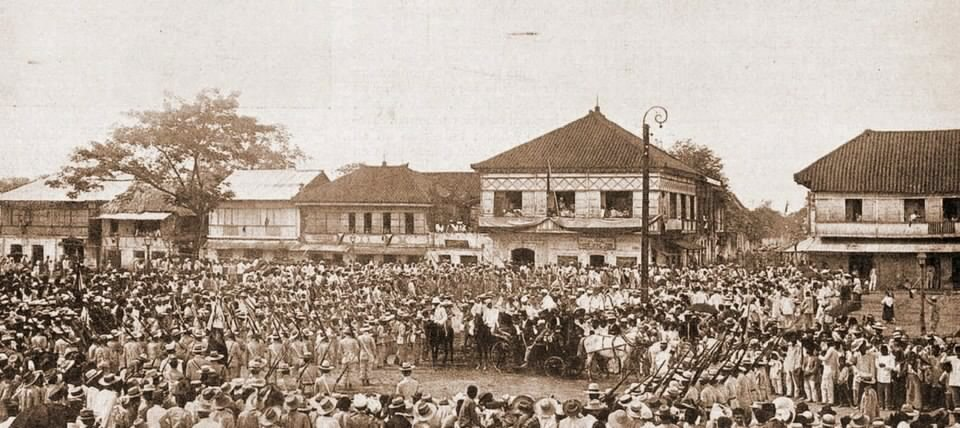
The inauguration of the First Philippine Republic in Malolos, January 23, 1899

In 1896, the Philippine Revolution began against Spanish colonial rule. In 1897, Philippine forces led by Aguinaldo signed a ceasefire with the Spanish authorities and Aguinaldo and other leaders went into exile in Hong Kong. In April 1898, the Spanish–American War broke out. The U.S. Navy's Asiatic Squadron, then in Hong Kong, sailed to the Philippines to engage the Spanish naval forces. On May 1, 1898, the U.S. Navy decisively defeated the Spanish Naval force and blockaded Manila Bay. The American naval commander, lacking forces to conduct land operations following his unexpectedly complete victory, returned Aguinaldo and a number of other revolutionary exiles to the Philippines from Hong Kong.

Aguinaldo arrived in the Philippines on May 24 and on that date, proclaimed a dictatorial government, rekindling the Philippine Revolution (formally established by decree on June 18). On June 12, he issued the Philippine Declaration of Independence from Spain at his ancestral home in Cavite. The Dictatorial Government was replaced by a revolutionary government on June 23, which conducted a mass liberation of the islands from Spanish rule. It provided for the creation of the Malolos Congress, a legislative body partially elected and partially appointed, which convened on September 15 to write a constitution.

On December 10, 1898, the 1898 Treaty of Paris was signed between Spain and the United States, ending the Spanish–American War and transferring the former's claim to the Philippines to the latter. The Revolutionary Government, through its accredited representative, Felipe Agoncillo, previously had an unproductive audience with the President of the United States, and now sought representation in the talks at Paris; Filipino representation was not granted and Agoncillo filed a protest against the Spanish act of ceding the Philippines, characterizing it as invalid under international law and therefore not binding. Agoncillo further contested the treaty and pushed for recognition of Philippine independence with the American Department of State and later the United States Senate, but his protests were paid no mind.

The draft constitution, chiefly written by Felipe Calderón, was approved by the Congress in December 1898, but Apolinario Mabini, through Aguinaldo, drafted amendments that allowed the President to rule by decree until other nations gave diplomatic recognition to the country. In response, the Congress named a commission headed by Calderón to investigate the proposed amendments, with the final report thoroughly objecting to Mabini's proposals, but a compromise was made and certain provisions were included in the final constitution, approved on January 20. Aguinaldo promulgated the constitution the next day, and the inauguration of the Constitution was scheduled for January 23. The constitution was titled "Constitución política", and was written in Spanish. (Note: The three parts of the constitution which are of particular interest are: Article 4 – paragraph 1 lists three distinct powers: "the legislative, the executive, and the judicial", and paragraph 2 provides: "the legislative, the executive, and the judicial", specifies that any two or more of these powers shall never be vested in a single individual, and specifies that the legislative power shall never be vested in a single individual.; Articles 54 and 55 – these mandate the election of seven legislators to a Permanent Commission which is to meet when convoked by its presiding officer during periods of legislative adjournment. This commission is mandated, among other things, "To act on pending matters which require proper action."; Article 99 – "Notwithstanding the general rule established in paragraph 2 of Article 4, in the meantime that the country is fighting for its independence, the Government is empowered to resolve during the closure of the Congress all questions and difficulties not provided for in the laws, which give rise to unforeseen events, by the issuance of decrees, of which the Permanent Commission shall be duly apprised as well as the Assembly when it meets in accordance with this Constitution."; In April 1899, the Permanent Commission was composed of Pedro A. Paterno, Felix Ferrer, Juan Nepomuceno, Arsenio Cruz Herrera, Joaquin Gonzales, Hugo Ilagan, and Alberto Barretto.)

=== Inauguration ===
On January 23, the Revolutionary Congress, upon swearing fealty to the constitution, assumed the functions of the Assembly of Representatives. Immediately after, it proceeded to elect the President of the Republic according to the provisions of the constitution, and unanimously elected Emilio Aguinaldo, now considered as the president of a former government. He was notified of his election by a commission named by the Congress and brought in a procession from the Malolos Cathedral, the seat of the presidency, to Barasoain Church, the seat of the Congress, where he swore his oath of office, administered by the President of the Congress, Pedro Paterno; the formula read by Aguinaldo, recorded in Tagalog, was: "I swear in the name of God that I will faithfully execute my duty, execute and cause to be executed the Constitution and the Laws, and take care that nobody shall violate the Mother Country." Paterno replied with: "If you do this, may God bless you. And if you don’t, may God punish you." Aguinaldo's oath was followed by an inaugural address. The inauguration of the Republic was celebrated by a parade of soldiers numbering 6,000 at the town plaza, and the celebration culminated in a display of the national flag to the sound of the national march. The inauguration was celebrated simultaneously in the surrounding towns.

=== Philippine–American War ===
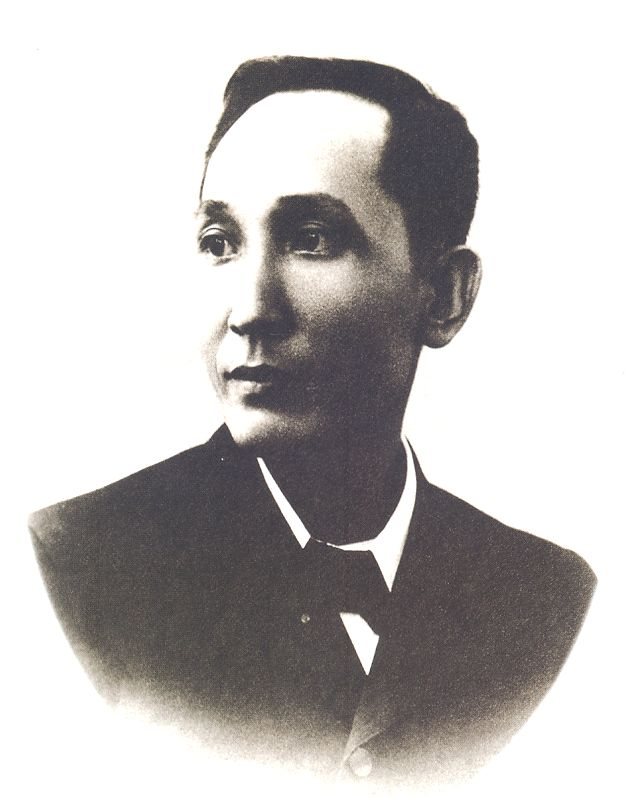
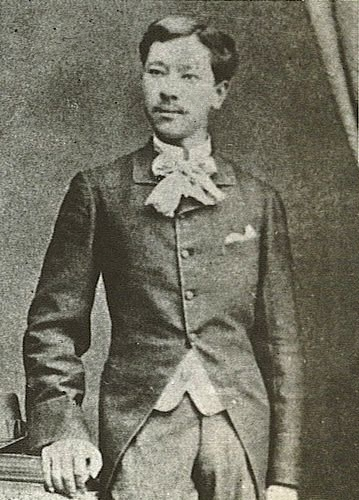
left: Apolinario Mabini the first prime minister of the first republic. right: Pedro Paterno the second prime minister of the first republic (Note: Several sources assert that shortly after installation of the Paterno cabinet, General Antonio Luna arrested Paterno and some or all of the cabinet secretaries. At least one source asserts that the Mabini cabinet was reinstalled after the arrests. Another source asserts that those arrested were released on orders of President Aguinaldo, but does not provide any indication about whether the Mabini or the Paterno cabinet was in office after the release.)

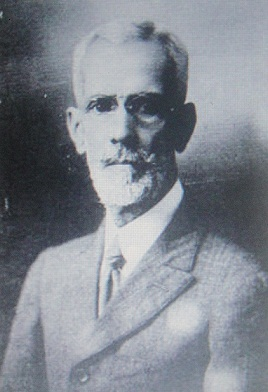
Trinidad Pardo de Tavera, Deputy Prime Minister of the First Philippine Republic

Hostilities erupted between US and Filipino forces in the suburbs of Manila, which until then had been the site of tensions between the Americans who controlled the capital city and the Filipinos who controlled the surrounding suburbs. That day President Aguinaldo issued a proclamation ordering and commanding that "peace and friendly relations with the Americans be broken and that the latter be treated as enemies, within the limits prescribed by the laws of war". The fighting quickly escalated into the Second Battle of Manila, with Philippine Republic's forces being driven out of the city. Caloocan would be captured on February 10 by northward-moving American forces.

On March 29, as American forces threatened Malolos, the seat of government moved to San Isidro, Nueva Ecija. On March 31, American forces captured Malolos, the initial seat of the Philippine Republic government, which had been gutted by fires set by withdrawing Philippine Republic forces. Emilio Aguinaldo and the core of the revolutionary government had by then moved to San Isidro, Nueva Ecija. Peace negotiations with the American Schurman Commission during a brief ceasefire in April–May 1899 failed, and San Isidro fell to American forces on May 16. The Philippine Republic core government had moved by then to Bamban, Tarlac, and subsequently moved to Tarlac town. Aguinaldo's party had already left Tarlac, the last capital of the Philippine Republic, by the time American troops occupied it on November 13.American forces captured Calumpit, Bulacan on April 27 and, moving north, captured Apalit, Pampanga with little opposition on May 4 and San Fernando, Pampanga on May 5. This forced the seat of government to be shifted according to the demands of the military situation.

In October 1899, American forces were in San Fernando, Pampanga and the Philippine Republic was headquartered not far north of there, in Angeles City. On October 12, an American offensive to the north forced the Philippine Republic to relocate its headquarters in November to Tarlac, and then to Bayambang, Pangasinan. On November 13, under pressure by American forces, Aguinaldo and a party departed Bayambang by rail for Calasiao, from where they immediately proceeded eastwards to Santa Barbara in order to evade pursuing American forces. There, they joined a force of some 1200 armed men led by General Gregorio del Pilar.

Aguinaldo had decided in aa November 13 conference in Bayambang to disperse his army and begin guerrilla war. From that point on, distance and the localistic nature of the fighting prevented him from exercising a strong influence on revolutionary or military operations. Recognizing that American troops blocked his escape east, he turned north and west on November 15, crossing the mountains into La Union province. Aguinaldo's party eluded pursuing American forces, passing through Tirad Pass near Sagada, Mountain Province where the Battle of Tirad Pass was fought on December 2 as a rear guard action to delay the American advance and ensure his escape. At the time of the battle, Aguinaldo and his party were encamped in Cervantes, about 10 km south of the pass. After being notified by a rider of the outcome of the battle and the death of del Pilar, Aguinaldo ordered that camp be broken, and departed with his party for Cayan settlement.

Aguinaldo's party, traveling with del Pilar's force, reached Manaoag, Pangasinan on November 15. There, the force was split into vanguard and rear guard elements, with Aguinaldo and del Pilar in the vanguard. The vanguard force overnighted in Tubao, La Union, departed there on November 16, and was in Naguilian, La Union by November 19, where word was received that American forces had taken Santo Tomas and had proceeded to Aringay. Aguinaldo's force arrived in Balaoan, La Union on November 19, pushed on the next day, and arrived at the Tirad Pass, a natural choke point, on November 23. General del Pilar decided to place a blocking force in Tirad Pass to delay pursuing American forces while Aguinaldo's party moved on.

The Battle of Tirad Pass took place on December 2, 1899. 52 men of del Pilar's 60-man force were killed, including del Pilar himself. However, the Filipinos under del Pilar held off the Americans long enough for Aguinaldo's party to escape. Aguinaldo, encamped with his party about 10 km south of the pass in Cervantes, Ilocos Sur, was apprised of the result of the battle by a rider, and moved on. The party reached Banane settlement on December 7, where Aguinaldo paused to consider plans for the future. On December 16, the party departed for Abra to join forces with General Manuel Tinio. The party traveled on foot through a pass at the summit of Mount Polis, and arrived at Ambayuan the next morning. The party pushed on to Banane, pursued closely by American forces. At this point, Aguinaldo's party consisted of one field officer, 11 line officers, and 107 men. The remainder of December 1899 was spent in continuous trek.

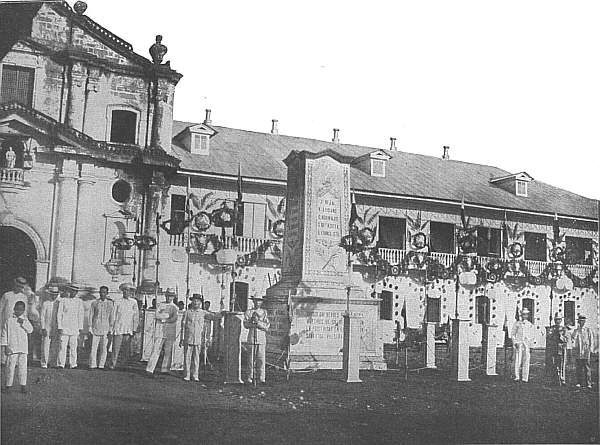
Filipino army officers in San Fernando, Pampanga Province, await President Aguinaldo's arrival from nearby Malolos, Oct. 9, 1898

The party was at the border of Abra and Cagayan provinces on Aguinaldo's 31st birthday on March 23, 1900. The trek from place to place continued until about May 22, 1900, when Aguinaldo established a new headquarters in Tierra Virgen. On August 27, 1900, after American forces landed at Aparri, Cagayan, Aguinaldo concluded that Tierra Virgan had become untenable as a headquarters and decided to march to Palanan, Isabela. On December 6, 1900, the party reached Dumasari, and arrived in Palanan the following morning.

Aguinaldo remained in Palanan until his capture there by American forces with the aid of the native scouts on March 23, 1901. Following his capture, Aguinaldo announced allegiance to the United States on April 19, 1901 and manifesting to the Philippine people to lay down their weapons, formally ending the First Republic and recognizing the sovereignty of the United States over the Philippines. However, some sources assert that Miguel Malvar succeeded to the presidency upon Aguinaldo's capture.

Fighting between the Americans and the remnants of the Philippine Republican Army continued until the surrender of General Miguel Malvar on April 16, 1902.

=== Dissolution ===
The governmental organization disintegrated as its officialw were coptured; Felipe Buencamino was captured in November, 1899, Appolinario Mabini in December 1899, Pedro Paterno in April 1900. The Battle of Tirad Pass, a heroic rearguard action led by Gregorio del Pilar saved Aguinaldo himself from capture in December 1899, and he was eventually captured in Palanan, Isabela, in March of 1901. On April 19, 1901, Aguinaldo published a minifesto to the Phili8ppine people in which he explicitly acknowledged and accepted US sovereignty throughout the Philippines. Malvar is considered by some to have succeeded to the presidency of the First Philippine Republic after Aguinaldo was captured by American forces. The date of Malvar's surrender to American forces, April 16, 1902, has been recognized by the Philippine government as the date the Philippine-American war ended.

== Organization ==
=== Presidency ===
Executive power was exercised by the President, through his cabinet secretaries. Emilio Aguinaldo, the incumbent president of the Revolutionary Republic initially assumed the presidency upon the promulgation of the constitution, and he was elected in the first election under the new regime. Presidents were to be elected by the legislature to terms of four years and to be eligible for reelection.

In addition to his basic powers, the 1899 Constitution assigned the following duties to the presidency:

1. Confer civil and military employment in accordance to the law
2. Appoint Secretaries of Government
3. Direct diplomatic and commercial relations with other countries
4. Ensure the swift and complete administration of justice in the entire national territory
5. Pardon criminal offenders in accordance with the law, subject to the provisions relating to the Secretaries of Government
6. Preside over national solemnities, and welcome accredited envoys and representatives of foreign countries with relations to the Republic

=== National cabinet ===
The constitution established a Council of Government, or Cabinet, composed of a President and seven Secretaries. The following individuals were appointed to Cabinet positions: (Note: Details of the composition of the cabinet differ between sources. Master List of Cabinet Members since 1899 in the Philippine Government's Official Gazette is more comprehensive than other sources seen, listing information for both the Mabini and Paterno cabinets.)

Office	Name	Term
President	Emilio Aguinaldo	January 23, 1899 – April 19, 1901
Prime Minister	Apolinario Mabini	January 2 – May 7, 1899
Prime Minister	Pedro Paterno	May 7 – November 13, 1899 (Note: Several sources assert that shortly after installation of the Paterno cabinet, General Antonio Luna arrested Paterno and some or all of the cabinet secretaries. At least one source asserts that the Mabini cabinet was reinstalled after the arrests. Another source asserts that those arrested were released on orders of President Aguinaldo, but does not provide any indication about whether the Mabini or the Paterno cabinet was in office after the release.)
Secretary of Foreign Affairs	Apolinario Mabini	October 1, 1898 – May 7, 1899
Secretary of the Interior	Teodoro Sandico	January 2 – May 7, 1899
Secretary of Finance	Mariano Trías	January 2 – May 7, 1899
Secretary of Finance	Hugo Ilagan	May 7 – November 13, 1899
Secretary of Finance	Severino de las Alas	May 7 – November 13, 1899
Secretary of War and Marine	Baldomero Aguinaldo	July 15, 1898 – May 7, 1899
Secretary of War and Marine	Mariano Trías	May 7 – November 13, 1899
Secretary of Justice	Gregorio Araneta	September 2, 1898 – May 7, 1899
Secretary of Welfare (Note: In the Mabini cabinet, the secretary of welfare had responsibility for public instruction, communications & public works, and agriculture, industry & commerce.)	Gracio Gonzaga	January 2 – May 7, 1899
Secretary of Welfare	Felipe Buencamino	May 7 – November 13, 1899
Secretary of Welfare	Maximino Paterno	May 7 – November 13, 1899
Secretary of Agriculture, Industry and Commerce	León María Guerrero	May 7 – November 13, 1899

The following are the executive departments:

- Foreign Relations
- Interior
- Finance
- War and the Navy
- Public Instruction
- Public Works and Communications
- Agriculture and Industries Commerce

=== Legislature ===
Legislative power was exercised by an Assembly of Representatives initially composed by members of the Revolutionary Government and subsequently elected to four year terms and organized in the form and manner determined by law and referred to at various points in the constitution as the National Assembly. It specified that assembly members would be chosen by election, but left the manner of the election to be later specified by law. The assembly was initially composed of the former members of the Malolos Congress and had powers and responsibilities detailed in Title IV of the constitution.

=== Provincial and local government ===
Municipal and provincial governments under the Republic had quickly reorganized upon Aguinaldo's decrees of June 18 and 20, 1898. Article 82 of the Malolos Constitution specified the principles governing local laws and governance, prescribing the maximum amount of decentralization and limiting the opportunity for intervention in subnational affairs by the central government.

=== Overseas territories ===
The government claimed jurisdiction over the overseas territory of Palaos (Modern day Palau) and the Sulu Archipelago. Both areas are represented in the Congress by representatives appointed by President Emilio Aguinaldo. Aguinaldo sent a letter to the Sultan of Sulu requesting that the islands be part of the First Philippine Republic, but the letter was ignored.

=== Judiciary ===
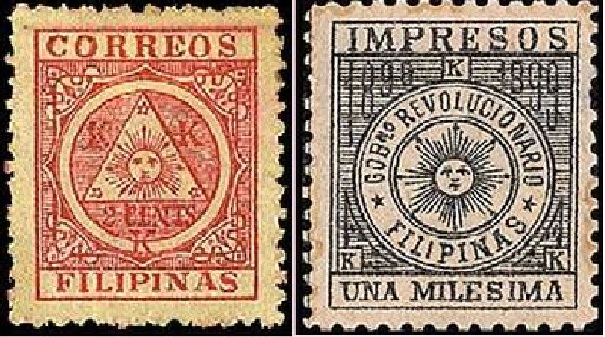
The postage stamps of the First Philippine Republic.

The Provisional Law on the Judiciary was issued on March 7, 1899, in accordance to the provisions of the 1899 Malolos Constitution providing that the Chief Justice shall be chosen by the National Assembly with the concurrence of the president and secretaries of the government. The Chief Justice simultaneously served as a vice-President of the Republic, who would become head of state in an acting capacity until the Assembly voted for a new President. Aguinaldo nominated Mabini to be the Chief Justice of the Supreme Court of the Philippines on August 23, 1899, but this nomination was rejected by an Assembly hostile to Mabini; the seat was instead given to Gracio Gonzaga.

The Supreme Court included Gracio Gonzaga serving as president; Juan Arceo and Felix Ferrer as Chamber Presidents; and Deogracias Reyes, Juan Tongco, Pablo Tecson, and Ygnacio Villamor serving as Associate Justices

== Finances ==
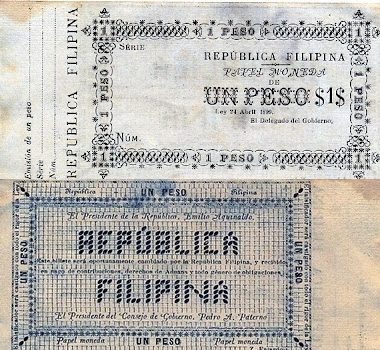
The one peso of the First Philippine Republic.

One of the important laws passed by the Malolos Congress was the law providing for a national loan to buoy up the national budget in which the Republic was trying to balance. The loan, worth 20 million pesos, was to be paid in 40 years with an annual interest of six percent. The law was decreed by Aguinaldo on November 30, 1898.

Emilio Aguinaldo ordered the issuance of 1, 2, 5, 10, 20, 50, 100-peso banknotes which were signed by Messrs. Pedro A. Paterno, Telesforo Chuidan and Mariano Limjap to avoid counterfeiting. However, only the 1 and 5-peso banknotes had been printed and circulated to some areas by the end of the short-lived republic. Aguinaldo also issued currency backed by the country's natural resources. Two types of two-centavo copper coins were struck at the Malolos arsenal. These were withdrawn from circulation and declared illegal currency after the surrender of General Aguinaldo to the Americans.

== Military ==
When Philippine independence was declared on June 12, 1898, the Philippine Revolutionary Army was renamed the Philippine Republican Army. Aguinaldo then appointed Antonio Luna as Director or Assistant Secretary of War by September 28, 1898, and the Philippines' first military school, the Academia Militar, was established in Malolos.

When the Republic was inaugurated on January 23, Luna had succeeded Artemio Ricarte as the Commanding General of the Republican Army. With such powers at hand, Luna attempted to transform the weak, undisciplined republican army into a disciplined regular army for the service of the Republic.

== Seats of government ==
- Cavite El Viejo – The hometown of General Aguinaldo where the declaration of independence was proclaimed on June 12, 1898.
- Bacoor, Cavite – The declaration of independence was first ratified in Cuenca House by 190 municipal presidents of different towns from 16 provinces.
- Malolos, Bulacan – In September 1898, General Emilio Aguinaldo made the Paroquia dela Inmaculada Concepcion, an Augustinian-built town church (now cathedral basilica) of Malolos, the executive palace while the nearby Barasoain Church served as the legislative house where the Malolos Constitution was written. When the Americans captured Malolos, Aguinaldo ordered General Antonio Luna to burn the Malolos Church, including its huge silver altar.
  Provinces that served as capital of the First Philippine Republic designated by Aguinaldo in his attempt to escape the American forces.
- Angeles, Pampanga – On March 17, 1899, General Emilio Aguinaldo transferred the seat of the First Philippine Republic to Angeles. It then became the site of celebrations for the first anniversary of Philippine independence.
- San Isidro, Nueva Ecija – On March 29, 1899, Aguinaldo arrived in Nueva Ecija and the town was made temporary capital of the First Philippine Republic. He stayed in this house which served as his executive office. When the Americans occupied San Isidro, the Sideco house served as the headquarters of Col. Frederick Funston who would later capture Aguinaldo in Palanan, Isabela. General Aguinaldo's capture is said to have been planned in this house.
- Tarlac – The Casa Real de Tarlac served as headquarters of the revolutionary capital after Nueva Ecija was captured by the Americans in 1899.
- Pangasinan – In November 1899, Aguinaldo designated Bayambang as seat of government after Tarlac was captured by the Americans.
- Kalinga – Aguinaldo made Lubuagan the seat of government for 73 days, from 6 March 1900 to 18 May 1900 before his escape and eventual capture at Palanan, Isabela.
- Palanan, Isabela – On March 23, 1901, Aguinlado was captured by American forces with the aid of the native scouts and eventually detained in a villa near Malacañang Palace.

=== Temporary capitals ===
- Angeles, Pampanga from March 17, 1899;
- San Isidro, Nueva Ecija from March 29, 1899;
- Cabanatuan, Nueva Ecija from May 9, 1899;
- Bamban, Tarlac from June 6, 1899;
- Tarlac City, Tarlac from June 21, 1899;
- Bayombong, Nueva Vizcaya from November 1899;
- Bayambang, Pangasinan, until November 13, 1899;
- Lubuagan, Kalinga, from March 6, 1900, to May 18, 1900;
- Palanan, Isabela until March 23, 1901.

=== Image gallery ===
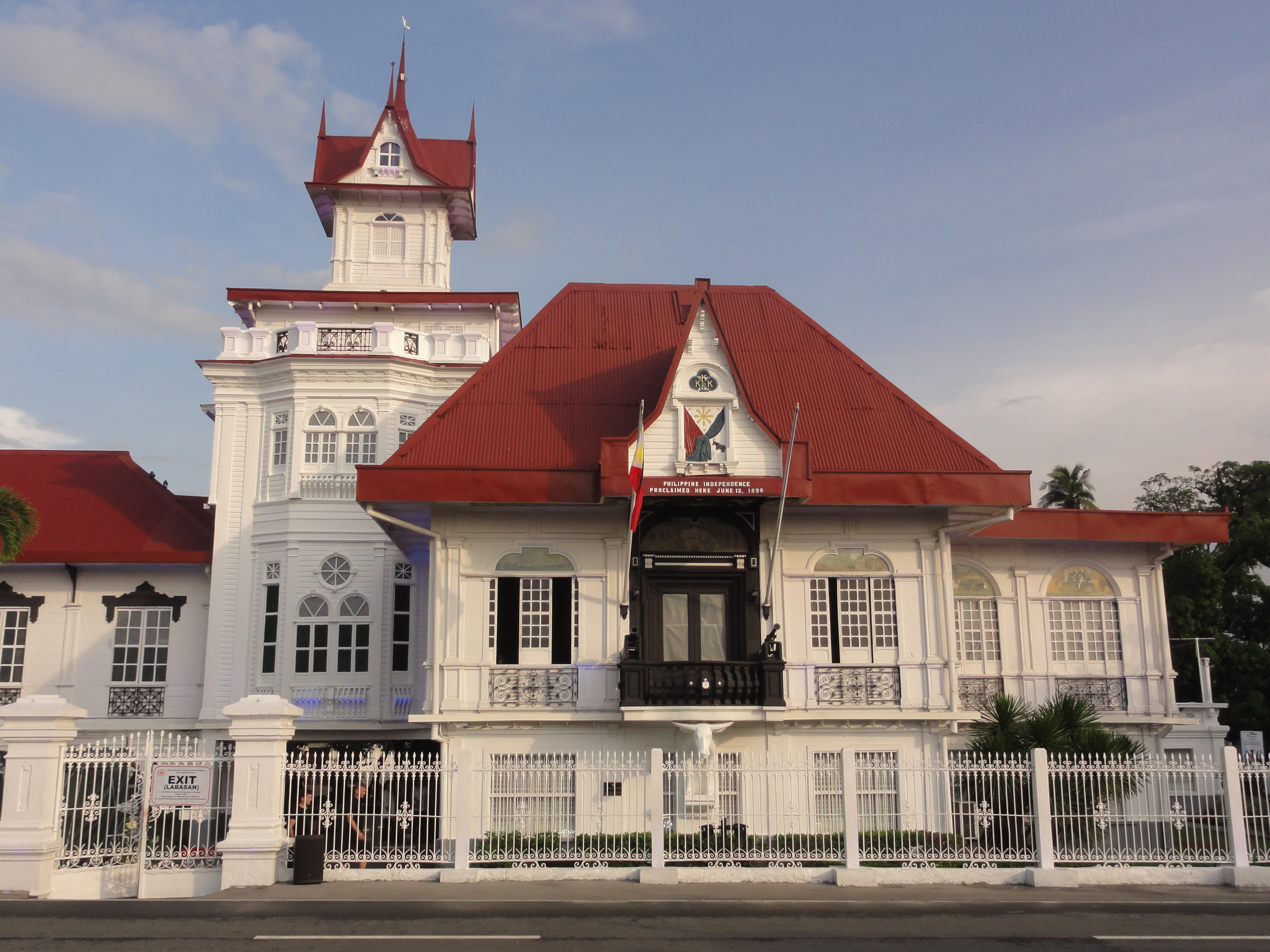
Aguinaldo Shrine where Philippine independence was declared from Spain

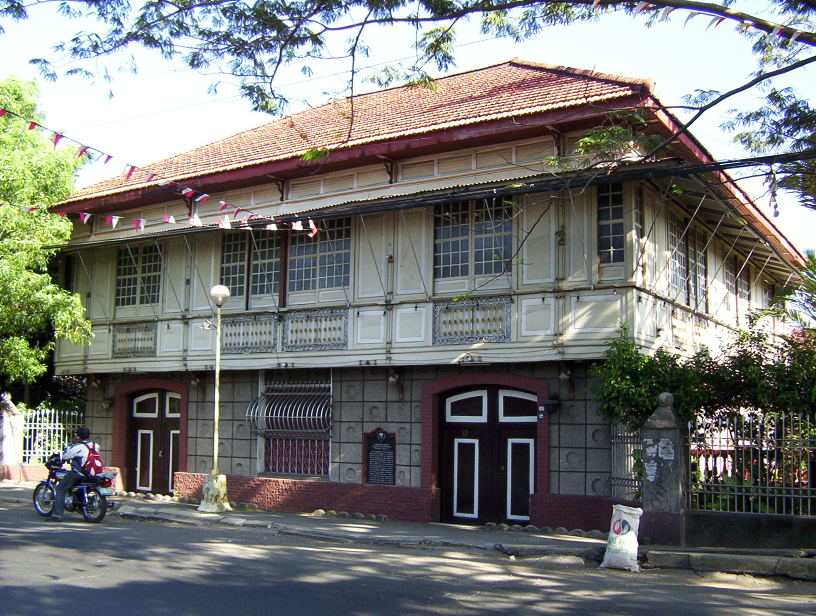
Cuenca House served as the headquarters of the Philippine revolutionary government in 1898.

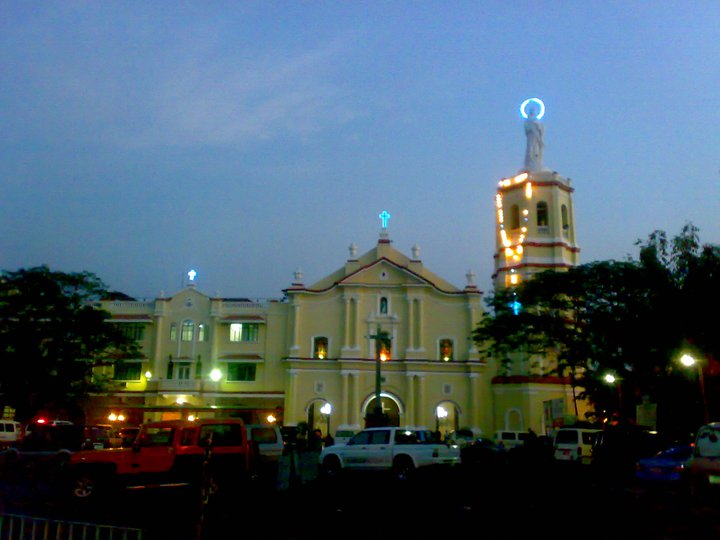
The Malolos Cathedral Basilica. The Palacio Presidencia and Office of the President Emilio Aguinaldo from September 1898 – March 1899.

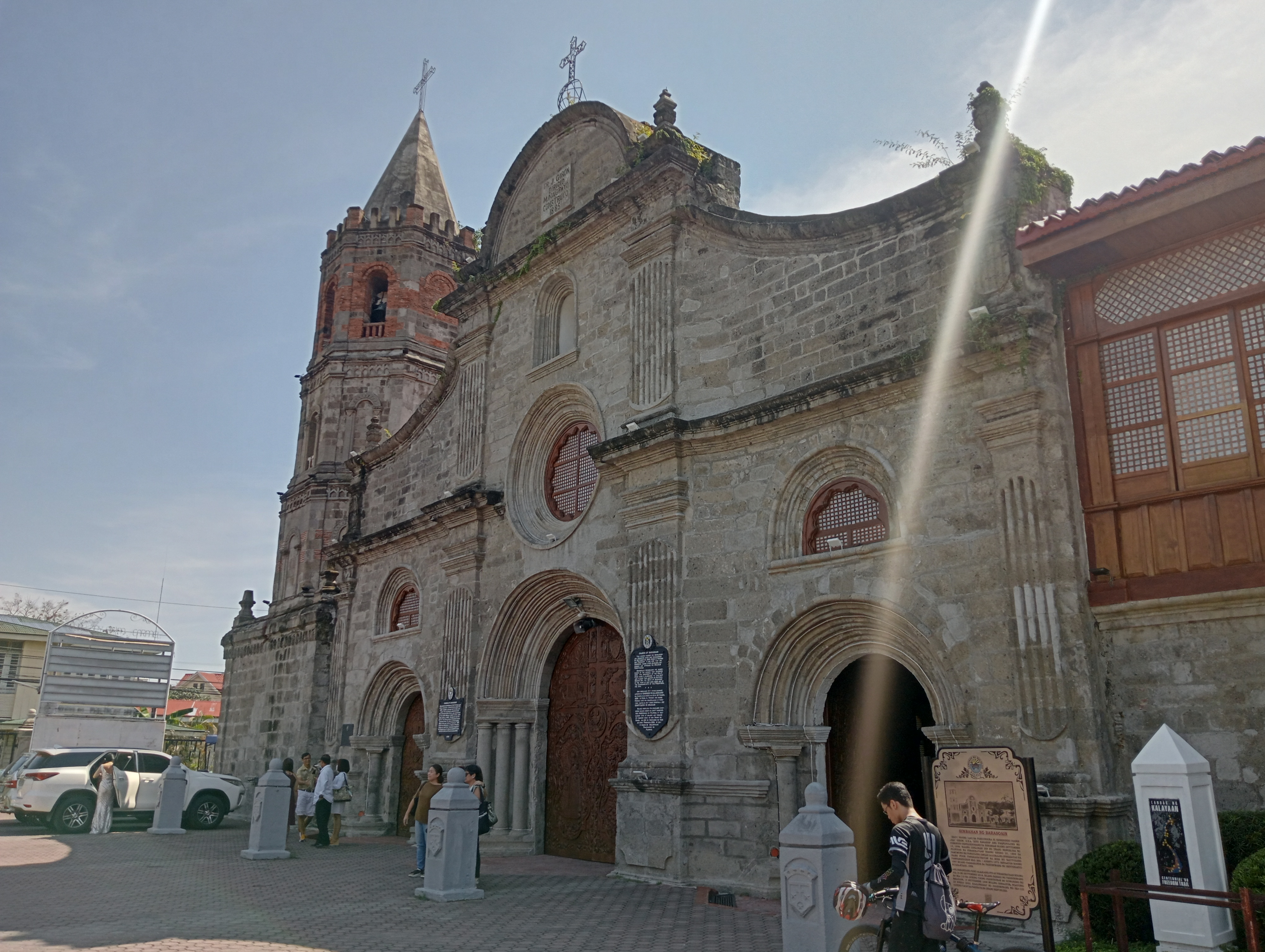
Barasoain Church the site of the First Philippine Congress, otherwise known as the Malolos Congress.

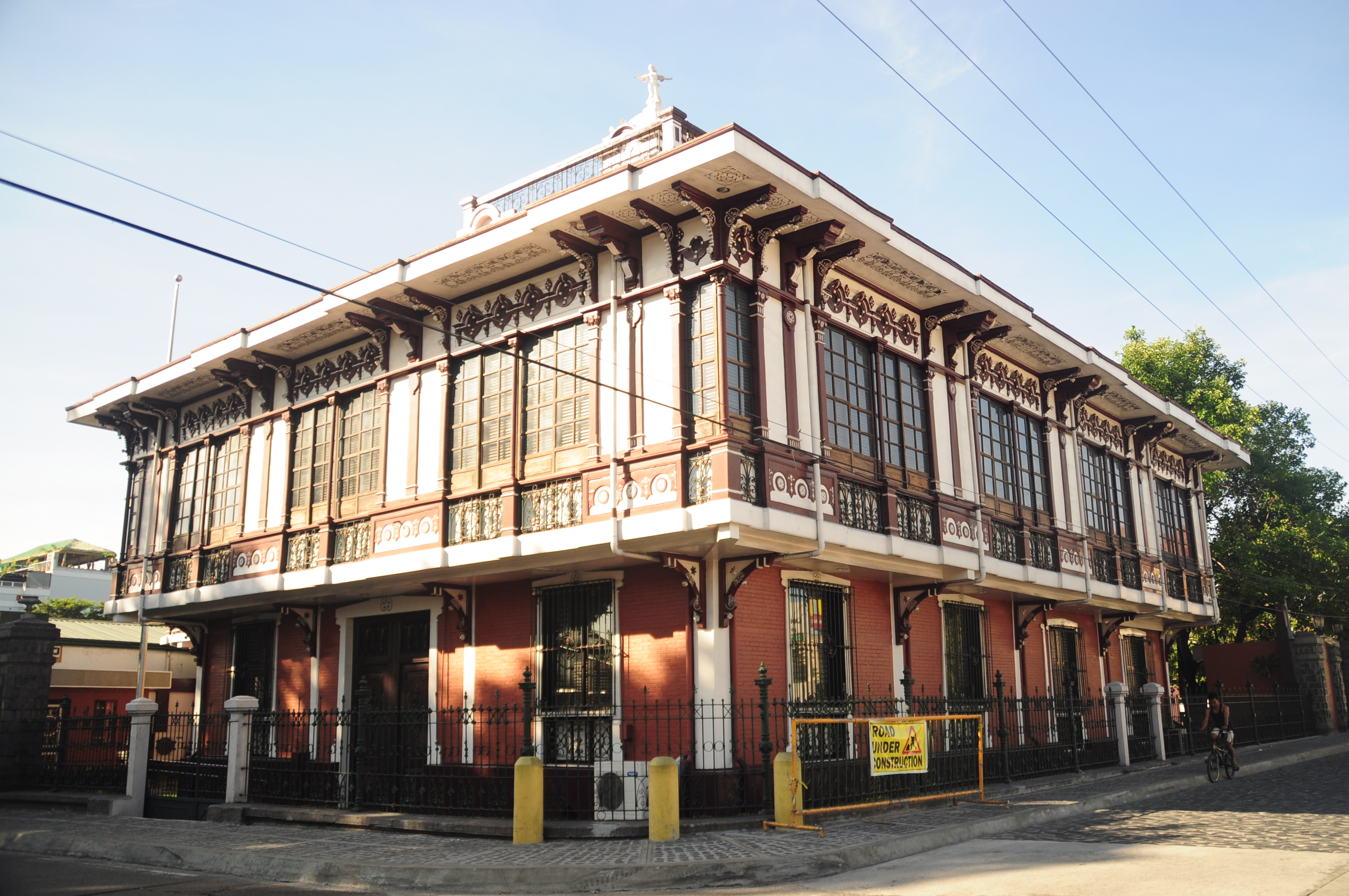
Pamintuan Mansion, where the first anniversary of Philippine independence was celebrated in 1899

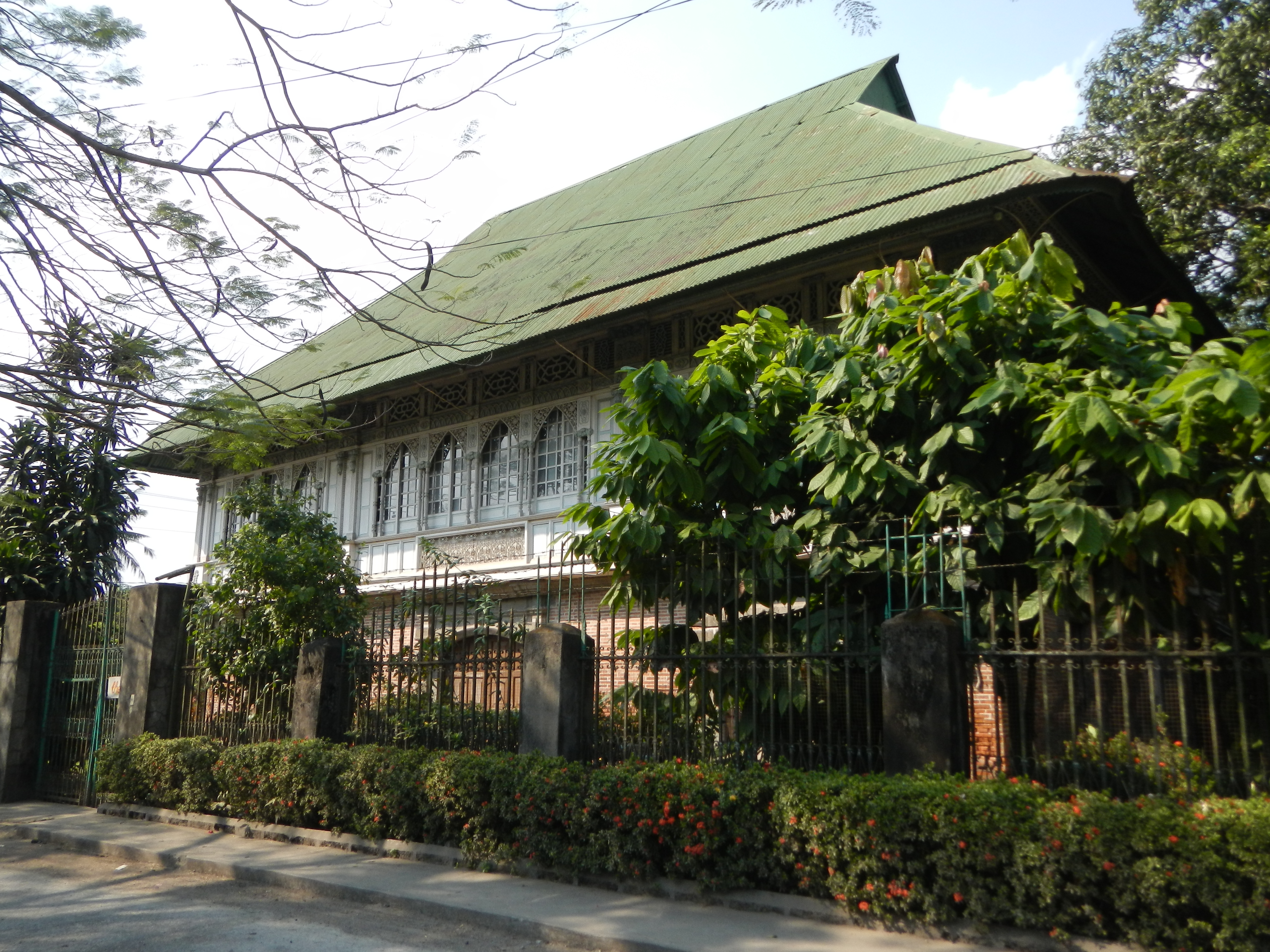
Sideco House served as Emilio Aguinaldo's capitol from the fall of Malolos on March 31, 1899, until May 17, 1899, when San Isidro was taken by the Americans.

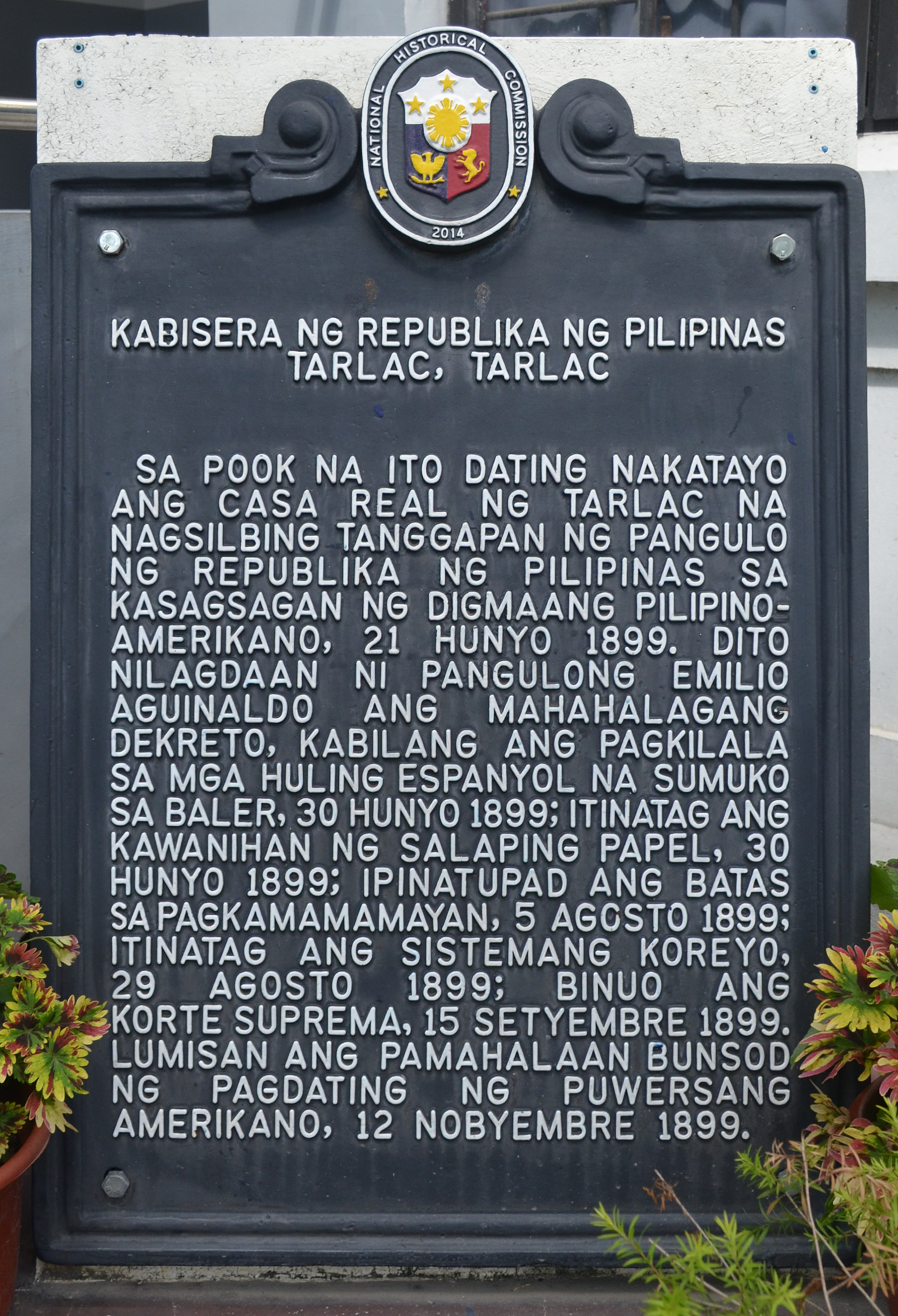
Historical marker located in present-day Tarlac State University, where the headquarters of the revolutionary republic transferred in 1899

== See also ==
- History of the Philippines (1898–1946)
- Sovereignty of the Philippines
- Federal State of the Visayas
- Republic of Negros
- Republic of Zamboanga

== Sources ==
- Agoncillo, Teodoro A. (1997). Malolos: The Crisis of the Republic. University of the Philippines Press. ISBN 978-971-542-096-9.
- Brands, Henry William (1992). Bound to empire: the United States and the Philippines. Oxford University Press. ISBN 978-0-19-507104-7.
- Calit, Harry S. (2003). The Philippines: current issues and historical background. Nova Science Publishers. ISBN 978-1-59033-576-5.
- Doyle, Robert C. (2010). The Enemy in Our Hands: America's Treatment of Enemy Prisoners of War from the Revolution to the War on Terror. University Press of Kentucky. ISBN 978-0-8131-2589-3.
- Duka, C. (2008). Struggle for Freedom. Rex Bookstore, Inc. ISBN 978-971-23-5045-0.
- Guevara, Sulpico, ed. (2005). The Laws of the First Philippine Republic (the laws of Malolos) 1898–1899. Ann Arbor, Michigan: University of Michigan Library. (published online 2005, University of Michigan Library)
- Halstead, Murat (1898). The Story of the Philippines and Our New Possessions, Including the Ladrones, Hawaii, Cuba and Porto Rico.
- Kalaw, Maximo Manguiat (1927). The Development of Philippine Politics. Oriental commercial.
- Linn, Brian McAllister (2000a). The Philippine War, 1899–1902. University Press of Kansas. ISBN 978-0-7006-1225-3.
- Linn, Brian McAllister (2000b). The U.S. Army and Counterinsurgency in the Philippine War, 1899–1902. UNC Press Books. ISBN 978-0-8078-4948-4.
- Schultz, Jeffrey D. (2000). Encyclopedia of Minorities in American Politics: African Americans and Asian Americans. Greenwood Publishing Group. ISBN 978-1-57356-148-8.
- Titherington, Richard Handfield (1900). A history of the Spanish–American War of 1898. D. Appleton and Company. (republished by openlibrary.org)
- Tucker, Spencer C. (2009). The Encyclopedia of the Spanish–American and Philippine–American Wars: A Political, Social, and Military History. ABC-CLIO. ISBN 978-1-85109-951-1.
- Zafra, Nicolas (1967). Philippine history through selected sources. Alemar-Phoenix Pub. House.
