= Secretary of Finance (Philippines) =

Finance minister of the Philippines

- Kalihim ng Pananalapi
- Official seal of the Department of Finance

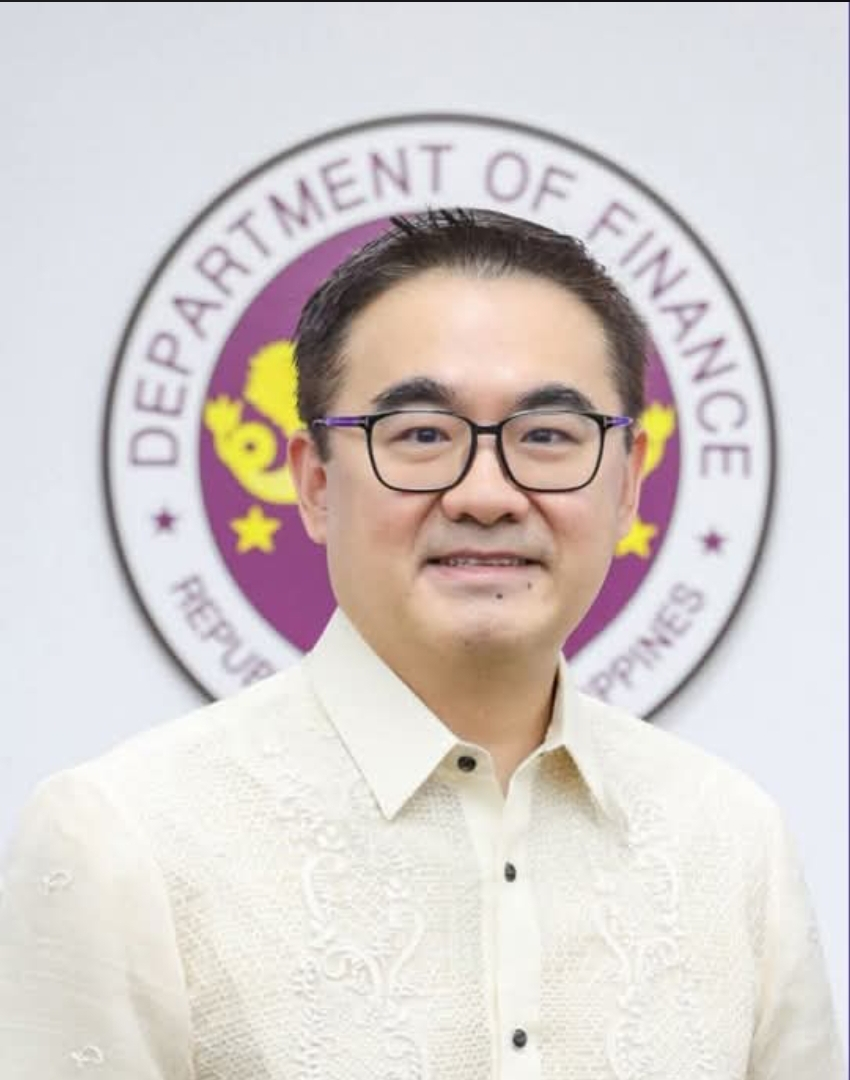
- Incumbent; Frederick Go since November 17, 2025
- Style: The Honorable
- Member of: Cabinet
- Appointer: The president with the consent of the Commission on Appointments
- Term length: No fixed term
- Inaugural holder: Baldomero Aguinaldo
- Formation: April 1897
- Website: dof.gov.ph

The Secretary of Finance (Filipino: kalihim ng pananalapi) is the cabinet member of the Philippines in charge of the Department of Finance.

Frederick Go has been the current Secretary of Finance since November 17, 2025.

== Powers and functions ==
According to the Administrative Code of 1987, the following are the powers and functions of a secretary:

- Advise the president on matters under a department's jurisdiction;
- Establish the policies and standards for a department's operation;
- Promulgate rules and regulations;
- Promulgate administrative issuances;
- Exercise disciplinary powers over officers and employees under a secretary;
- Appoint officers and employees in a department;
- Exercise jurisdiction over a department's bureaus, offices, agencies, and corporations;
- Delegate authority to officers and employees;
- Perform other functions provided by law.

== List of Secretaries of finance ==
=== Director of Finance (1897) ===
Portrait	Name (Birth–Death)	Took office	Left office	President
	Baldomero Aguinaldo (1869–1915)	April 24, 1897	November 1, 1897	Emilio Aguinaldo

=== Secretary of the Treasury (1897) ===
Portrait	Name (Birth–Death)	Took office	Left office	President
	Baldomero Aguinaldo (1869–1915)	November 1, 1897	December 15, 1897	Emilio Aguinaldo

=== Secretary of Finance (1898–1899) ===
Portrait	Name (Birth–Death)	Took office	Left office	President
	Mariano Trías (1868–1914)	January 23, 1899	May 7, 1899	Emilio Aguinaldo
	Hugo Ilagan	May 7, 1899	November 13, 1899	Emilio Aguinaldo

=== Secretary of Finance and Justice (1901–1917) ===
Portrait	Name (Birth–Death)	Took office	Left office	Governor-General
	Henry Clay Ide (1844–1921)	September 1, 1901	June 30, 1908	William Howard Taft
	Henry Clay Ide (1844–1921)	September 1, 1901	June 30, 1908	Luke Edward Wright
	Henry Clay Ide (1844–1921)	September 1, 1901	June 30, 1908	Henry Clay Ide
	Henry Clay Ide (1844–1921)	September 1, 1901	June 30, 1908	James Francis Smith
	Gregorio S. Araneta (1869–1930)	July 1, 1908	October 30, 1913	James Francis Smith
	Gregorio S. Araneta (1869–1930)	July 1, 1908	October 30, 1913	William Cameron Forbes
	Gregorio S. Araneta (1869–1930)	July 1, 1908	October 30, 1913	Newton W. Gilbert
	Gregorio S. Araneta (1869–1930)	July 1, 1908	October 30, 1913	Francis Burton Harrison
	Victorino Mapa (1855–1927)	October 30, 1913	January 1, 1917	Francis Burton Harrison

=== Secretary of Finance (1917–1935) ===
Act No. 2666 was passed on November 18, 1916, creating the Department of Finance from the Department of Finance and Justice as of January 1, 1917.

Portrait	Name (Birth–Death)	Took office	Left office	Governor-General
	Victorino Mapa (1855–1927)	January 1, 1917	January 15, 1917	Francis Burton Harrison
	Alberto Barretto	January 15, 1917	July 17, 1928	Francis Burton Harrison
	Alberto Barretto	January 15, 1917	July 17, 1928	Charles Yeater
	Alberto Barretto	January 15, 1917	July 17, 1928	Leonard Wood
	Alberto Barretto	January 15, 1917	July 17, 1928	Eugene Allen Gilmore
	Alberto Barretto	January 15, 1917	July 17, 1928	Henry L. Stimson
	Miguel Unson (Note: Miguel Unson served in an acting capacity from July 17 until August 14, 1928.)	July 17, 1928	August 14, 1928	Henry L. Stimson
	Miguel Unson	August 14, 1928	December 13, 1931	Henry L. Stimson
	Miguel Unson	August 14, 1928	December 13, 1931	Eugene Allen Gilmore
	Miguel Unson	August 14, 1928	December 13, 1931	Dwight F. Davis
	Vicente Carmona; Acting	January 1, 1932	December 31, 1932	Dwight F. Davis
	Vicente Carmona; Acting	January 1, 1932	December 31, 1932	George C. Butte
	Vicente Carmona; Acting	January 1, 1932	December 31, 1932	Theodore Roosevelt Jr.
	Rafael Alunan Sr. (1885–1947)	January 1, 1933	April 30, 1933	Theodore Roosevelt Jr.
	Vicente Singson Encarnacion (1875–1961); Acting	April 30, 1933	July 24, 1934	Theodore Roosevelt Jr.
	Vicente Singson Encarnacion (1875–1961); Acting	April 30, 1933	July 24, 1934	Frank Murphy
	Elpidio Quirino (1890–1956)	July 25, 1934	November 15, 1935	Frank Murphy

=== Secretary of Finance (1935–1941) ===
Portrait	Name (Birth–Death)	Took office	Left office	President
	Elpidio Quirino (1890–1956)	November 15, 1935	February 18, 1936	Manuel L. Quezon
	Antonio de las Alas (1889–1983)	February 19, 1936	November 15, 1938	Manuel L. Quezon
	Manuel Roxas (1892–1948)	November 26, 1938	August 28, 1941	Manuel L. Quezon
	Serafin Marabut	August 28, 1941	December 24, 1941	Manuel L. Quezon

=== Secretary of Finance, Agriculture and Commerce (1941–1944) ===
President Manuel L. Quezon issued Executive Order No. 396 on December 24, 1941, reorganizing the Department of Finance as the Department of Finance, Agriculture, and Commerce.

Portrait	Name (Birth–Death)	Took office	Left office	President
	José Abad Santos (1886–1942)	December 24, 1941	March 26, 1942	Manuel L. Quezon
	Andrés Soriano (1898–1964)	March 26, 1942	July 31, 1944	Manuel L. Quezon

=== Commissioner of Finance (1942–1943) ===
Portrait	Name (Birth–Death)	Took office	Left office	Chairman of the Philippine Executive Commission
	Antonio de las Alas (1889–1983)	January 26, 1942	October 14, 1943	Jorge B. Vargas

=== Minister of Finance (1943–1945) ===
Portrait	Name (Birth–Death)	Took office	Left office	President
	Antonio de las Alas (1889–1983)	October 14, 1943	March 20, 1945	Jose P. Laurel

=== Secretary of Finance (1944–1978) ===
President Sergio Osmeña issued Executive Order No. 15-W on August 8, 1944, creating the Department of Finance from the Department of Finance, Agriculture, and Commerce.

Portrait	Name (Birth–Death)	Took office	Left office	President
	Jaime Hernandez	August 8, 1944	May 27, 1946	Sergio Osmeña
	Elpidio Quirino (Note: In concurrent capacity as the Vice President.) (1890–1956)	May 28, 1946	November 24, 1946	Manuel Roxas
	Miguel Cuaderno Sr. (1890–1975)	November 25, 1946	January 2, 1949	Manuel Roxas
	Miguel Cuaderno Sr. (1890–1975)	November 25, 1946	January 2, 1949	Elpidio Quirino
	Jaime Hernandez	January; 1949	January; 1952	Elpidio Quirino
	Aurelio Montinola Sr.	January; 1952	December; 1953	Elpidio Quirino
	Jaime Hernandez	December; 1953	January; 1960	Ramon Magsaysay
	Jaime Hernandez	December; 1953	January; 1960	Carlos P. Garcia
	Dominador Aytona (1918–2017)	January 25, 1960	December 29, 1961	Carlos P. Garcia
	Fernando E. V. Sison	January 2, 1962	July 31, 1962	Diosdado Macapagal
	Rodrigo D. Perez Jr.	August 1, 1962	January 7, 1964	Diosdado Macapagal
	Rufino G. Hechanova	January 8, 1964	December 13, 1965	Diosdado Macapagal
	Eduardo Romualdez (1909–2001)	January 1, 1966	February 4, 1970	Ferdinand Marcos
	Cesar Virata (1930–2026)	February 9, 1970	June 2, 1978	Ferdinand Marcos

=== Minister of Finance (1978–1987) ===
President Ferdinand Marcos issued Presidential Decree No. 1397 on June 2, 1978, converting all departments into ministries headed by ministers.

Portrait	Name (Birth–Death)	Took office	Left office	President
	Cesar Virata (1930–2026)	June 2, 1978	March 3, 1986	Ferdinand Marcos
	Jaime Ongpin (1939–1987)	March 26, 1986	February 11, 1987	Corazon Aquino

=== Secretary of Finance (from 1987) ===
President Corazon Aquino issued Administrative Order No. 15 on February 11, 1987, converting all ministries into departments headed by secretaries.

Portrait	Name (Birth–Death)	Took office	Left office	President
	Jaime Ongpin (1939–1987)	February 11, 1987	September 14, 1987	Corazon Aquino
	Vicente Jayme	September 15, 1987	December; 1989	Corazon Aquino
	Jesus Estanislao	January 1, 1990	June 30, 1992	Corazon Aquino
	Ramon del Rosario	July 1, 1992	June 1, 1993	Fidel V. Ramos
	Ernest Leung	June 2, 1993	January 31, 1994	Fidel V. Ramos
	Roberto de Ocampo	February 1, 1994	March 30, 1998	Fidel V. Ramos
	Salvador Enriquez	April 1, 1998	June 30, 1998	Fidel V. Ramos
	Edgardo Espiritu (1935–2025)	July 1, 1998	December 31, 1999	Joseph Estrada
	Jose Pardo	January 2, 2000	January 20, 2001	Joseph Estrada
	Alberto Romulo (born 1933)	January 23, 2001	June 30, 2001	Gloria Macapagal Arroyo
	Jose Isidro Camacho (born 1955)	June 30, 2001	November 30, 2003	Gloria Macapagal Arroyo
	Juanita Amatong (born 1935)	December 1, 2003	February 14, 2005	Gloria Macapagal Arroyo
	Cesar Purisima (born 1960)	February 15, 2005	July 15, 2005	Gloria Macapagal Arroyo
	Margarito Teves (born 1943)	July 22, 2005	June 30, 2010	Gloria Macapagal Arroyo
	Cesar Purisima (born 1960)	June 30, 2010	June 30, 2016	Benigno Aquino III
	Carlos Dominguez III (born 1945)	June 30, 2016	June 30, 2022	Rodrigo Duterte
	Benjamin Diokno (born 1948)	June 30, 2022	January 12, 2024	Bongbong Marcos
	Ralph Recto (born 1964)	January 12, 2024	November 17, 2025	Bongbong Marcos
	Frederick Go (born 1970)	November 17, 2025	Incumbent	Bongbong Marcos
