= Telesforo Chuidian =

Filipino businessman (1855–1903)

Telésforo Chuydian
- Born: January 5, 1855 Binondo, Manila
- Died: April 11, 1903 (aged 48)
- Resting place: Manila North Cemetery
- Occupation: Businessman
- Parents: Silveria Chuaquico; Jose Antonio Chuy Dian

Telésforo Chuydian (January 5, 1855 – 1903) was a Filipino businessman known for providing financial support for the propaganda movement and the Philippine Revolution against Spain.

== Early life and education ==
Chuidian was born in Binondo, Manila, in 1855. His parents were Silveria Chuaquico and Jose Antonio Chuy Dian, a merchant who came from Xiamen, China. He inherited the family business upon his father's death, which resulted for him to quit his studies at the Ateneo de Manila University.

== Career ==
=== Businessman ===
Chuidian established Sociedad Chuidian, Buenaventura, y Cía, a business engaged in the import of Arabian horses, perfumes, and other merchandise. His business also provided cash loans for coffee and sugar plantations in Batangas. From his business, Chuidian was able to acquire several haciendas and properties in Manila.

=== Revolution supporter ===
Chuidian was one of people who financed the La Liga Filipina, a political group founded in 1892 by Jose Rizal. He, with 22 others, was arrested and imprisoned in 1896 in Fort Santiago for their participation in anti-Spanish movements.

After the independence of the Philippines from Spain in 1898, Chuidian, together with others, founded the Club Filipino Independiente. He became the club's first leader.

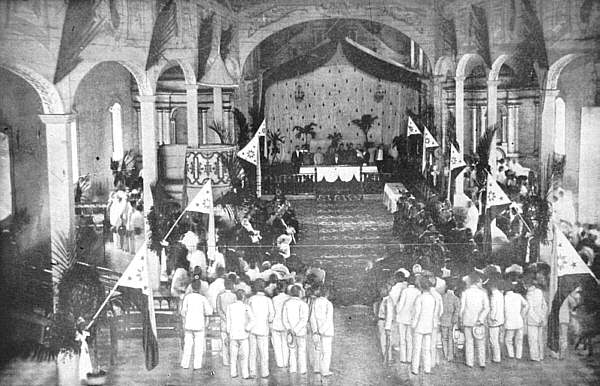
The Malolos Congress

Moreover, Chuidian became a member of the Malolos Congress. Under Emilio Aguinaldo, the Philippine government issued its own paper currency with Chuidian, Pedro Paterno, and Mariano Limjap as signatories. However, the paper notes were later withdrawn from circulation with the surrender of Filipino revolutionists and the occupation of the Americans in the country.

== Death ==
Chuidian contracted tuberculosis of the larynx and died in 1903 at age 48.

== Recognitions ==
- Order of Isabella the Catholic
- Kapitan Tiago, a fictional character in Noli Me Tangere, a novel written by Jose Rizal, was inspired by Chuidian
