= Baldomero Aguinaldo =

Filipino revolutionary leader (1869–1915)

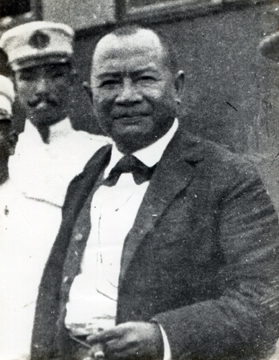
- Baldomero Aguinaldo in 1899

Minister/Secretary of War and Public Works
- In office July 15, 1898 – May 6, 1899
- President: Emilio Aguinaldo
- Preceded by: Emiliano Riego de Dios
- Succeeded by: Mariano Trías

Secretary of Treasury
- In office November 2, 1897 – 1899
- Appointed by: Emilio Aguinaldo
- Preceded by: Position created
- Succeeded by: Hugo Ilagan

Director of Finance
- In office April 1897 – November 1897
- Appointed by: Emilio Aguinaldo
- Preceded by: Position created
- Succeeded by: Mariano Trías

Personal details
- Born: February 27, 1869 Cavite El Viejo, Cavite, Captaincy General of the Philippines
- Died: February 4, 1915 (aged 45) Malate, Manila, Philippine Islands
- Resting place: Baldomero Aguinaldo Shrine, Kawit, Cavite, Philippines
- Spouse: Petrona Reyes
- Children: 2
- Education: University of Santo Tomas
- Awards: Cruz Roja del Merito Militar (Red Cross for Military Honor)
- Nickname: Baldo

Military service
- Allegiance: First Philippine Republic; Republic of Biak-na-Bato; Katipunan (Magdalo)
- Branch/service: Philippine Revolutionary Army
- Years of service: 1896–1901
- Rank: Lieutenant General
- Battles/wars: Philippine Revolution; Battle of Imus; Battle of Binakayan-Dalahican; Philippine–American War

Baldomero Aguinaldo y Baloy (February 27, 1869 – February 4, 1915) was a leader of the Philippine Revolution. He was the first cousin of Emilio Aguinaldo and the grandfather of Cesar Virata, a former prime minister in the 1980s.

== Early life ==
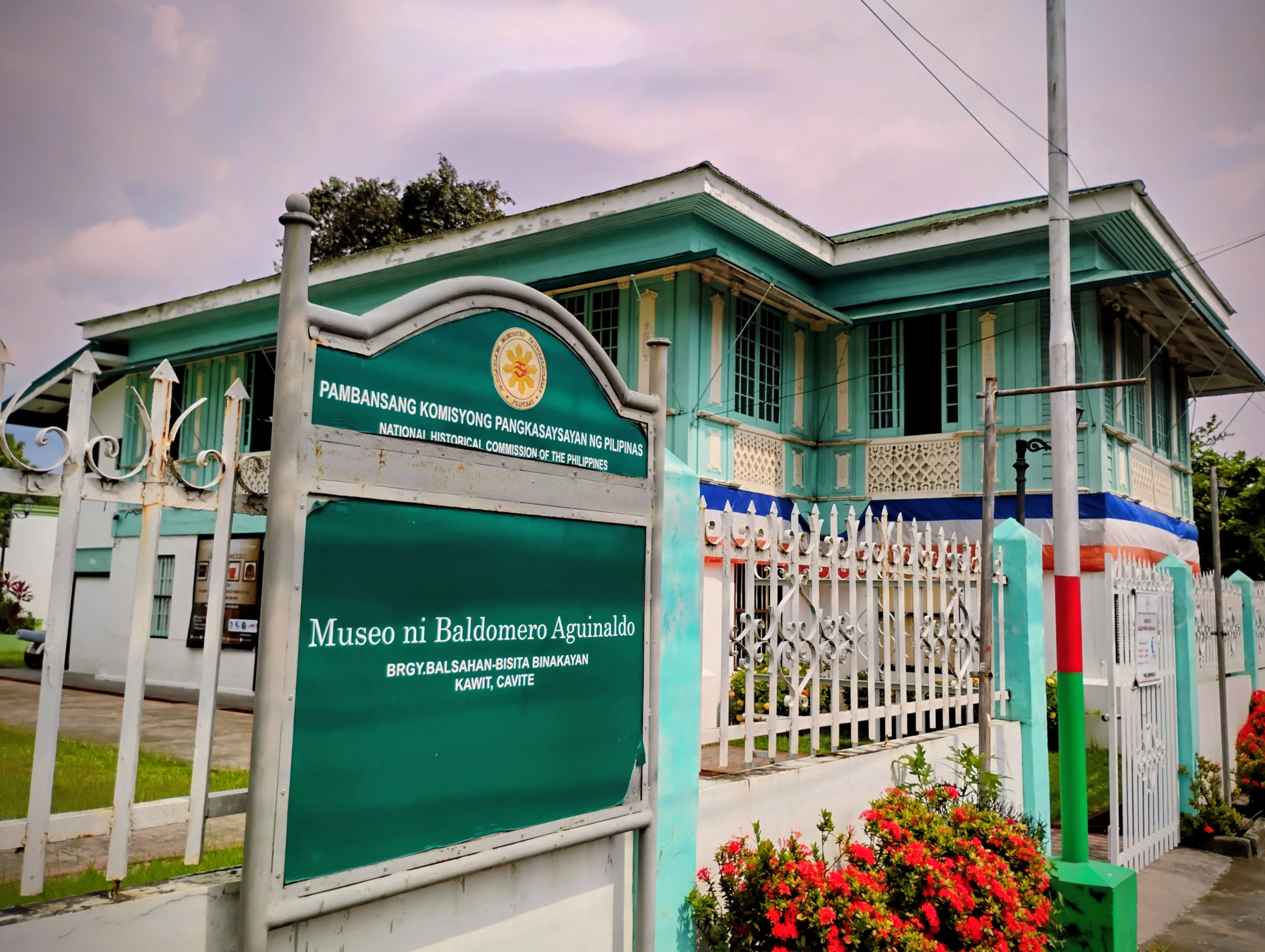
Baldomero Aguinaldo Ancestral House in Kawit, Cavite, now maintained as a museum

Baldomero Aguinaldo was born in Cavite el Viejo (now Kawit), Cavite. He was the son of Cipriano Aguinaldo y Jamir and Silveria Baloy. His father was the son of Eugenio Aguinaldo y Kajigas and Maria Jamir.

== Education ==
Aguinaldo studied at the Ateneo Municipal de Manila and then law at the University of Santo Tomas, both in Manila. He was still a law student during the outbreak of the Philippine Revolution. He obtained a law degree, but failed to take the bar examination. Unable to practice law, he became a farmer.

== Career ==
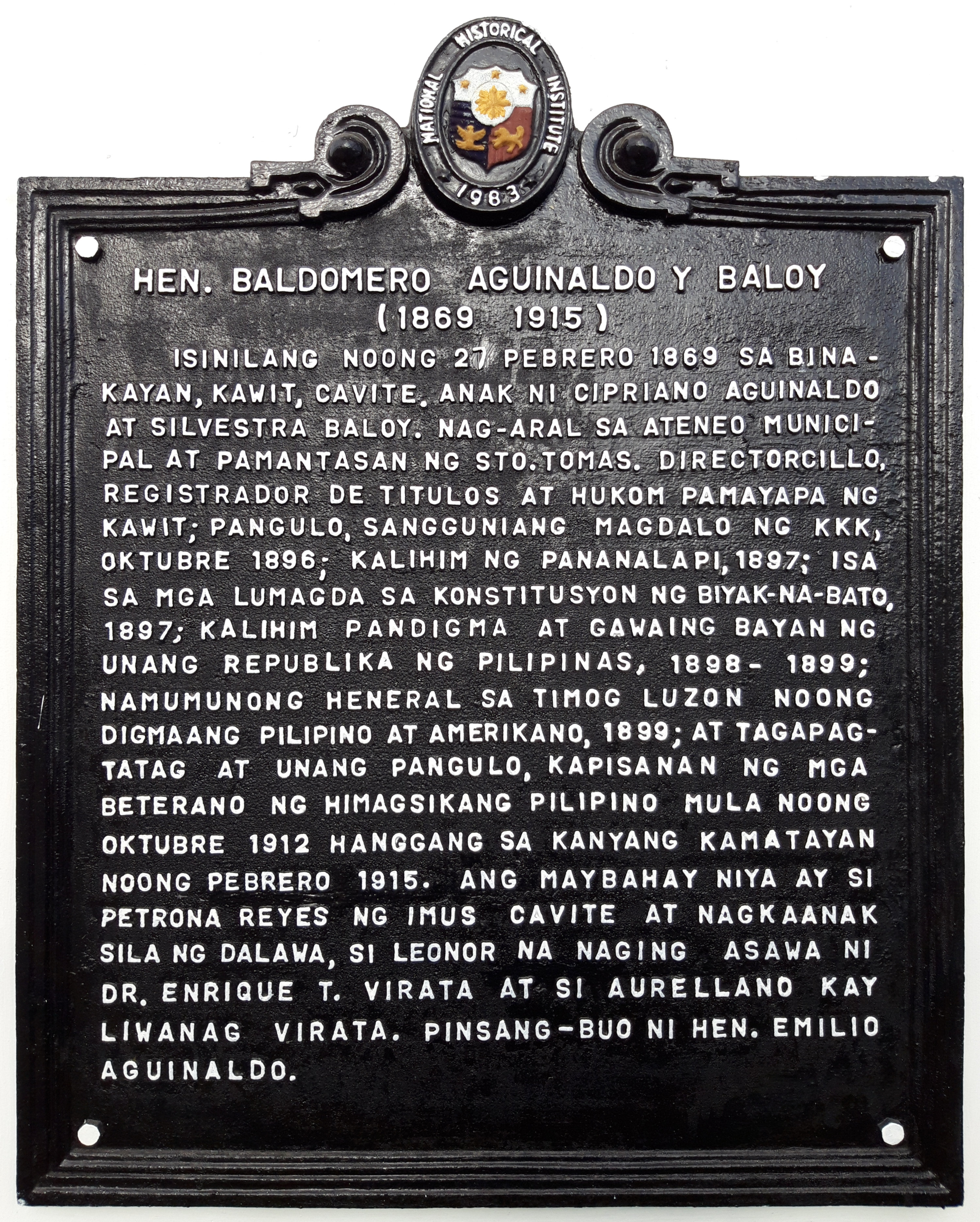
National Historical Institute marker in Tagalog installed at the Baldomero Aguinaldo Shrine

Aguinaldo organized, along with his cousin Emilio, the Magdalo chapter of the Katipunan in Kawit. He became president of the council. In the early days of hostilities, he always stayed at the side of his cousin Emilio. He fought in several bloody battles. He also led the Magdalo faction to the Katipunan which had its headquarters in Kawit, Cavite.

Aguinaldo's knowledge of the law and administrative procedures made him a valuable asset to the revolutionary government. He was appointed to several cabinet positions, and was a signer of two important documents: The Biak-na-bato Constitution, and the Pact of Biak-na-Bato.

During the Philippine–American War, Aguinaldo fought again, becoming commanding general of the revolutionary forces in the southern Luzon provinces. When hostilities ended in 1901, he retired to private life.

He held many various positions in the Aguinaldo Cabinet as Director of Finance, Secretary of Treasury, and Minister of National Defense. During the American occupation, he became the President of the Philippine Veterans Association.

== Personal life ==
He was married to Doña Petrona Reyes with 2 children: Leonor and Aureliano. Leonor was the mother of former Prime Minister Cesar Virata. Aguinaldo was a member of the Philippine Independent Church (IFI, also known as the Aglipayan Church) as he saw independence from the Roman Catholic Church as a source of national pride. He was elected President of the Comite de Caballeros ("Gentlemen's Committee") of the Philippine Independent Church in Kawit. He had initially organized a local lay organization within the IFI in Binakayan, Kawit in 1904 which later became the splinter group Iglesia de la Libertad in 1938 led by its priest and bishop, Hermogenes Ramirez and Jose Gamad, respectively. Both clerics later returned to IFI.

== Death ==
Baldomero suffered from heart failure and rheumatism at the age of 45 in Malate, Manila. Emilio Aguinaldo, Felipe Agoncillo, Mariano Ponce, and Gregorio Aglipay were among those who paid their respects at his wake, which lasted nearly two weeks. On February 21, 1915, a large audience assembled at the Manila North Cemetery for his funeral; numerous groups such as the Guías Nacionales, Batallón escolar del Liceo de Manila, Guerrilleros Filipinos, and newspaper officials were there.

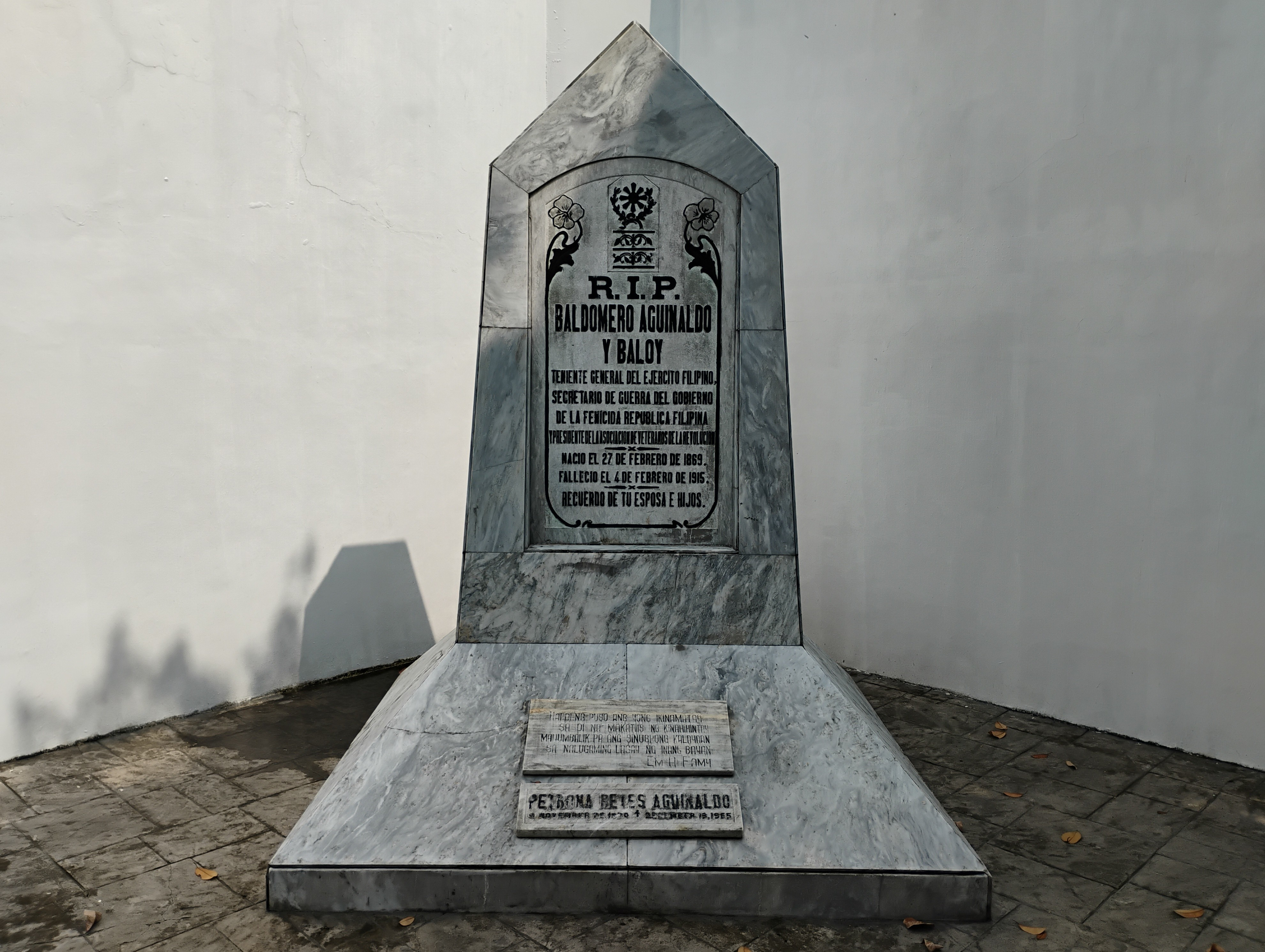
Tombstone marking the grave of Aguinaldo and his wife Petrona

His remains were later interred at his family's home in Kawit, which has since been converted into a museum commemorating his life and operated by the National Historical Commission of the Philippines.

== In popular culture ==
- Portrayed by Bayani Agbayani in the 2012 film, El Presidente.
- Portrayed by Gexter Abad in the 2013 TV series, Katipunan.
- Portrayed by Jan Urbano in the 2014 film, Bonifacio: Ang Unang Pangulo.

Government offices
New office	Director of Finance; 1897	Succeeded by Mariano Trías as Minister of Finance
New office	Secretary of Treasury; 1897–1899	Succeeded by Hugo Ilagan
Preceded by Emiliano Riego de Dios as Director of War	Minister/Secretary of War and Public Works; 1898–1899	Succeeded by Mariano Trías
