= Malolos Congress =

First legislative body of the Philippines

Malolos Congress Congreso de Malolos Congreso Revolucionario
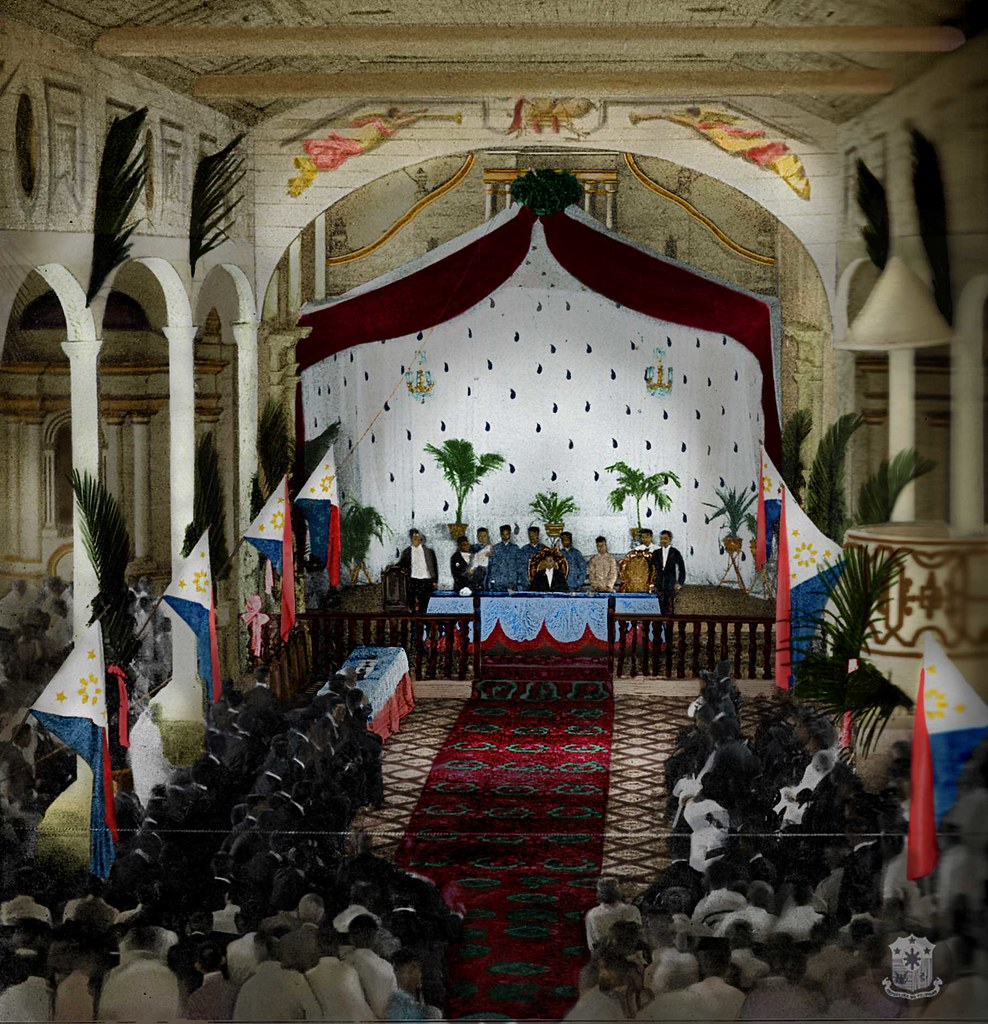

Type
- Type: Unicameral

History
- Founded: September 15, 1898
- Disbanded: November 13, 1899
- Preceded by: Cortes of Cádiz; Ayuntamiento
- Succeeded by: Taft Commission

Leadership
- President of the National Assembly: Pedro Paterno
- Vice President of the National Assembly: Benito Legarda
- Seats: 136 (Note: In the book Malolos: The Crisis of the Republic by Teodoro Agoncillo, the Malolos Congress had 193 delegates (42 elected and 151 appointed).)

Meeting place
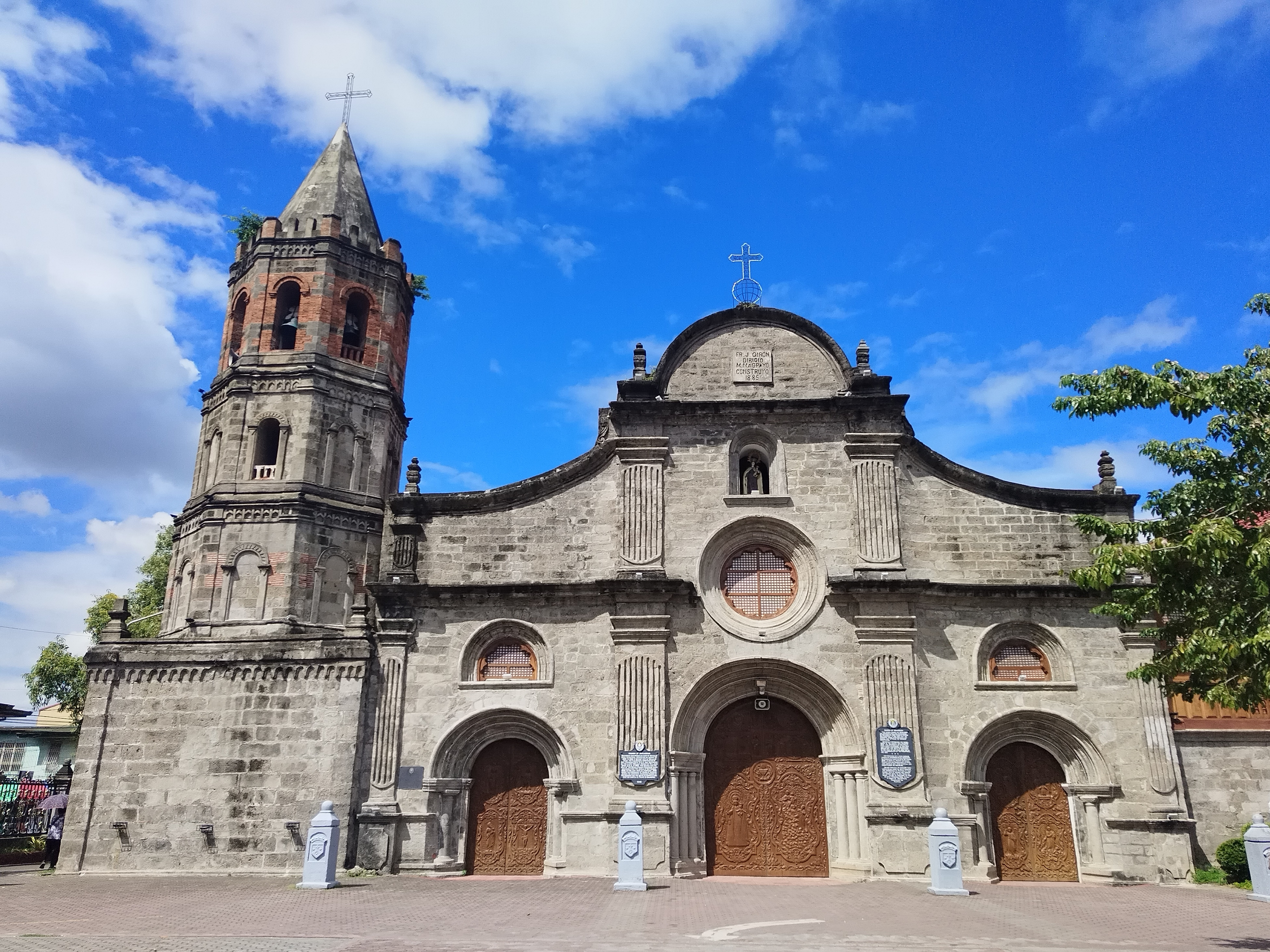
- Barasoain Church

The Malolos Congress (Spanish: Congreso de Malolos), also known as the Revolutionary Congress (Spanish: Congreso Revolucionario) and formally the National Assembly, was the legislative body of the Revolutionary Government of the Philippines and, later, as the Philippine Republic.

From 1898 to 1899, prior to the Philippine Declaration of Independence and their gathering at Barasoain Church in Malolos, Bulacan, for the drafting of the Malolos Constitution, congressional delegates used the Malolos station at the Malolos town center.

Members were chosen in the elections held from June 23 to September 10, 1898. The assembly consisted of elected delegates chosen by balloting in provincial assemblies and appointed delegates chosen by the president to represent regions under unstable military and civilian conditions. The Revolutionary Congress was opened on September 15, 1898. President Emilio Aguinaldo presided over the opening session of the assembly.

After the promulgation of the Malolos Constitution on January 22, 1899, replaced the revolutionary government with the Philippine Republic, (Note: Now commonly referred to as the First Philippine Republic; see the Philippine Republic article for further info.) the Malolos Congress became the legislative branch of that government, designated in the constitution as the Assembly of Representatives.

== Sessions ==
- Regular session: September 15, 1898 – November 13, 1899
- Special session: February 4, 1899

== Leadership ==
President of the Congress

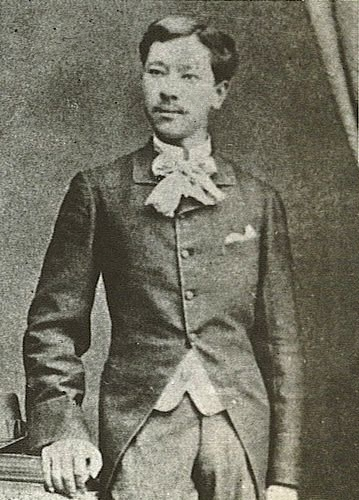
Pedro Paterno

- President: Pedro Paterno
- Vice President: Benito Legarda
- Secretaries:
  - Gregorio S. Araneta
  - Pablo Ocampo

== Members ==
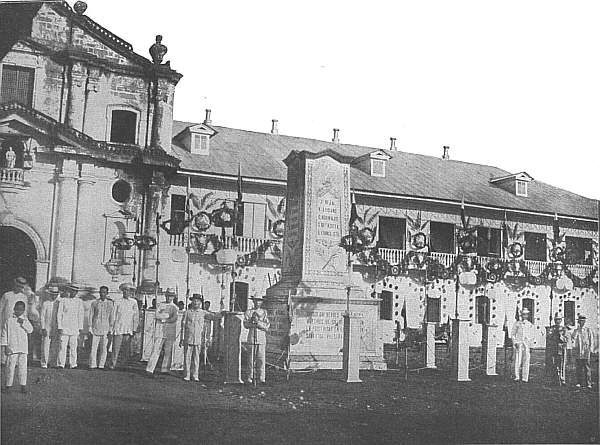
Soldiers of the Philippine Revolutionary Army during a session of the Congress.

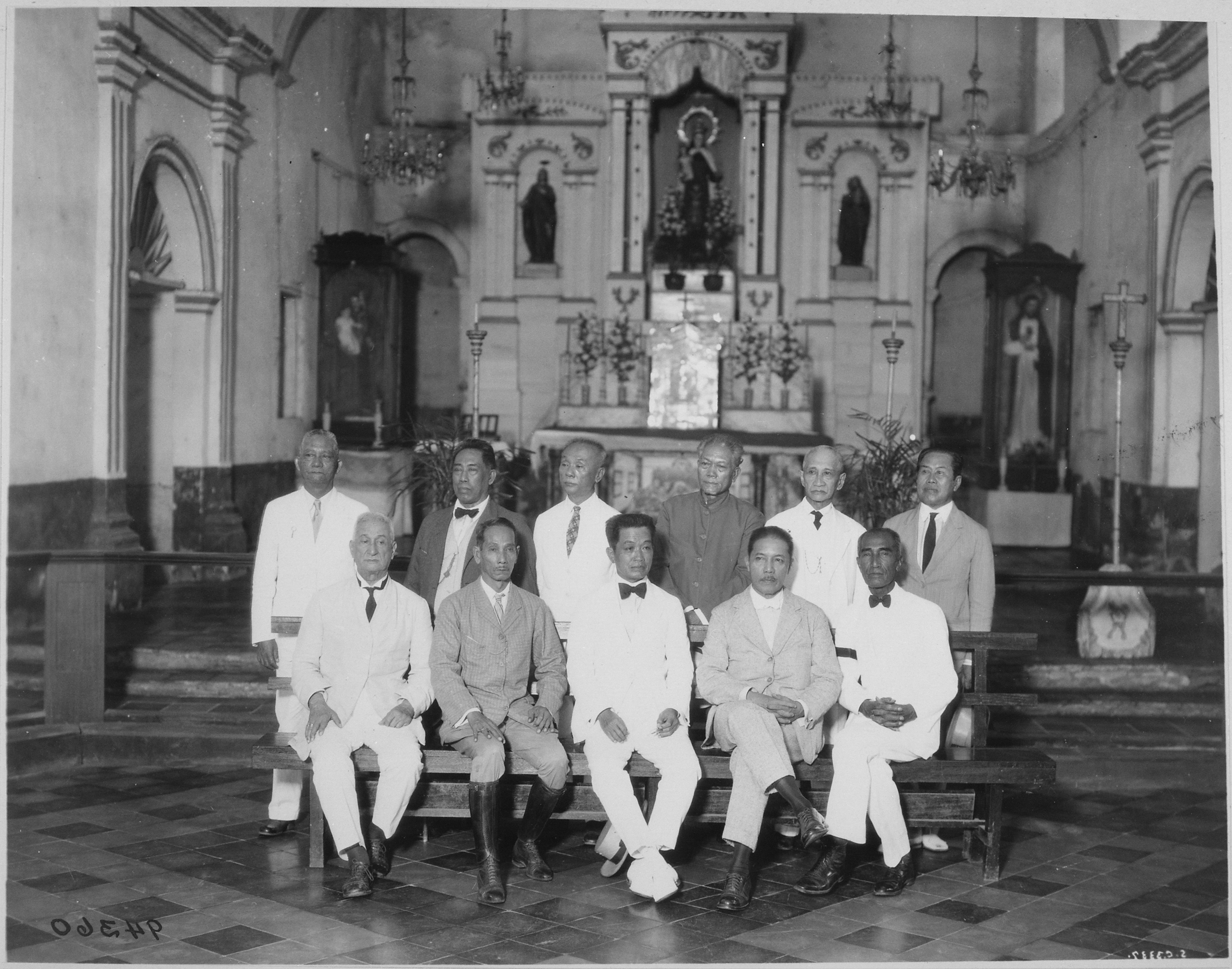
Emilio Aguinaldo (seated, center) and ten of the delegates to the first Assembly of Representatives.

Province	Delegates	Notes
Abra	Isidro Paredes	Elected
Abra	Juan Villamor	Elected
Albay	Honorato Agrava	Elected
Albay	Marcial Calleja	Elected
Albay	Salvador del Rosario	Elected
Albay	Pantaleón García	Elected
Albay	Águedo Velarde	Appointed
Antique	Ariston Gella	Appointed
Antique	Vicente López	Appointed
Antique	Eusebio Natividad	Appointed
Bataan	Hermogenes Marco	Elected
Bataan	Pedro Teopaco	Elected
Bataan	José Tuazon	Elected
Batanes	Vito Belarmino	Appointed
Batanes	Daniel Tirona	Elected
Batangas	Gregorio Aguilera	Elected
Batangas	Ambrosio Flores	Elected
Batangas	Eduardo Gutiérrez David	Elected
Batangas	Mariano López	Elected
Bohol	Tranquilino Arroyo	Appointed
Bohol	Anastasio Pinson	Appointed
Bohol	Pedro Tongio Liongson	Appointed
Bontoc	Pablo Ocampo	Appointed
Bulacan	Trinidad Icasiano	Elected
Bulacan	Pedro Serrano Laktaw	Elected
Bulacan	Mariano Crisóstomo Lugo	Elected
Bulacan	Ambrosio Rianzares Bautista	Elected
Cagayan	Anastacio Francisco	Appointed
Cagayan	Vicente Guzmán Pagulayan	Elected
Cagayan	Pablo Tecson	Appointed
Calamianes	Norberto Cruz Herrera	Appointed
Calamianes	Narciso Hidalgo Resurrección	Appointed
Camarines	Tomás Arejola	Elected
Camarines	Justo Lukban	Elected
Camarines	Mariano Abella	Elected
Camarines	Valeriano Velarde	Elected
Capiz	Mariano Bacani	Appointed
Capiz	Juan Baltazar	Appointed
Capiz	Miguel Zaragoza	Appointed
Catanduanes	José Alejandrino	Appointed
Catanduanes	Marcelino de Santos	Appointed
Cavite	José Basa	Elected
Cavite	Severino de las Alas	Elected
Cavite	Hugo Ilagan	Elected
Cavite	José Salamanca	Elected
Cebu	Ariston Bautista	Appointed
Cebu	Félix David	Appointed
Cebu	Francisco Makabulos	Appointed
Cebu	Trinidad Pardo de Tavera	Appointed
Cotabato	José M. Lerma	Appointed
Cotabato	Pedro Layug Villaluz	Appointed
Davao	León María Guerrero	Appointed
Davao	Ceferino Pantoja	Appointed
Ilocos Norte	Gregorio Aglipay	Elected
Ilocos Norte	Primitivo Donato	Elected
Ilocos Norte	Martín García	Elected
Ilocos Norte	José Luna	Elected
Ilocos Norte	Pedro Paterno	Elected
Ilocos Norte	Pío Romero	Elected
Ilocos Sur	Marcelino Crisólogo	Appointed
Ilocos Sur	Mariano Fos	Elected
Ilocos Sur	Francisco Tongson	Elected
Ilocos Sur	Ignacio Villamor	Elected
Iloilo	Ariano Hernández	Appointed
Iloilo	Venancio Concepción	Appointed
Iloilo	Esteban de la Rama	Appointed
Iloilo	Melecio Figueroa	Appointed
Iloilo	Tiburcio Hilario	Appointed
Isabela	Raymundo Alindada	Appointed
Isabela	Eustacio del Rosario	Elected
Isabela	Abelardo Guzmán	Elected
Jolo	Benito Legarda	Appointed
Jolo	Víctor Papa	Appointed
La Union	Mateo del Rosario	Appointed
La Union	Joaquín Luna	Elected
La Union	Miguel Paterno	Appointed
Laguna	Higinio Benítez	Elected
Laguna	Graciano Cordero	Elected
Laguna	Mauricio Ilagan	Elected
Laguna	Manuel Sityar	Elected
Lepanto	Leon Apacible	Elected
Lepanto	Reymundo Jeciel	Elected
Lepanto	Antonio Rebello	Elected
Leyte	Simplicio del Rosario	Appointed
Leyte	Rafael Guerrero	Appointed
Leyte	Lucio Navarro	Appointed
Leyte	Marciano Zamora Concepción	Appointed
Manila	Arsenio Cruz Herrera	Elected
Manila	Félix Ferrer Pascual	Elected
Manila	Teodoro Gonzáles Leaño	Elected
Manila	Mariano Limjap	Elected
Masbate	Alberto Barretto	Appointed
Masbate	Máximo Cabigting	Appointed
Mindoro	Antonio Constantino	Elected
Mindoro	Arturo Dancel	Appointed
Mindoro	Perfecto Gabriel	Appointed
Misamis	Gracio Gonzaga	Appointed
Misamis	Apolonio Mercado	Appointed
Misamis	Teodoro Sandiko	Appointed
Morong	Marcelo Mesina	Elected
Morong	José Oliveros	Elected
Negros Occidental	Juan Benson	Appointed
Negros Occidental	José de la Viña	Appointed
Negros Occidental	Antonio Montenegro	Appointed
Negros Oriental	Pío del Pilar	Appointed
Negros Oriental	Mariano Leogardo Oirola	Appointed
Negros Oriental	Luciano San Miguel	Appointed
Nueva Ecija	Epifanio de los Santos	Elected
Nueva Ecija	Gregorio Macapinlac	Elected
Nueva Ecija	José Turiano Santiago	Elected
Nueva Vizcaya	Hipólito Magsalin	Appointed
Nueva Vizcaya	Evaristo Panganiban	Elected
Padre Burgos	Joaquín Baltazar	Elected
Padre Burgos	Ceferino de León	Appointed
Padre Burgos	Sixto Zandueta	Appointed
Palaos	Isidro Tiongco	Appointed
Pampanga	Joaquín González	Elected
Pampanga	Ramón Henson	Elected
Pampanga	Enrique Macapinlac	Elected
Pampanga	José Rodríguez Infante	Elected
Pangasinan	Sebastián de Castro	Appointed
Pangasinan	Vicente del Prado	Elected
Pangasinan	Antonio Feliciano	Elected
Pangasinan	Adriano Garces	Appointed
Paragua	Felipe Calderón	Appointed
Paragua	Domingo Colmenar	Appointed
Samar	Servillano Aquino	Appointed
Samar	Javier Gonzáles Salvador	Appointed
Samar	Juan Tongco	Appointed
Sorsogon	Maximino Hizon	Appointed
Sorsogon	Pedro Lipana	Appointed
Sorsogon	Manuel Xerez Burgos	Appointed
Surigao	Timoteo Paez	Elected
Surigao	Tomás del Rosario	Elected
Tarlac	Julián Carpio	Elected
Tarlac	Juan Nepomuceno	Elected
Tarlac	Victoriano Tañedo	Elected
Tayabas	Sofio Alandy	Elected
Tayabas	José Espinosa	Appointed
Tayabas	Basílio Teodoro	Appointed
Tucuran	Telesforo Chuidian	Appointed
Zambales	Alejandro Albert	Elected
Zambales	Félix S. Bautista	Appointed
Zambales	Juan Manday Gabriel	Elected
Zamboanga	Felipe Buencamino	Appointed
Zamboanga	Tomás Mascardo	Appointed
Zamboanga	Lázaro Tañedo	Appointed

In 2006, it was asserted by the president of the Bulacan Historical Society, engineer Marcial Aniag, that of the 85 delegates who convened in Malolos, were 43 lawyers, 17 doctors, five pharmacists, three educators, seven businessmen, four painters, three military men, a priest, and four farmers. Five of the 85 delegates did not have a college degree.

== Ratification of the declaration of independence ==
One of the first acts of the Revolutionary Congress was the ratification on September 29, 1898 of the Philippine Declaration of Independence against Spain which had been proclaimed on June 12, 1898.

== Malolos Constitution ==
Mabini had planned for the Revolutionary Congress to act only as an advisory body to the president and submitted a draft of Constitutional Program of the Philippine Republic while Paterno submitted a constitutional draft based on the Spanish Constitution of 1869. The Congress, however, began work to draft a constitution. The resulting document, the Malolos Constitution, was promulgated on January 21, 1899. Its proclamation resulted in the creation of the Philippine Republic, which replaced the Revolutionary Government.
