= Mariano Trías =

Vice President First Philippine Republic (1868–1914)

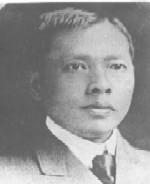

Vice President of the Tejeros Revolutionary Government
- In office March 22, 1897 – November 2, 1897
- President: Emilio Aguinaldo

Vice President of the Republic of Biak-na-Bato
- In office November 2, 1897 – December 14, 1897
- President: Emilio Aguinaldo

Minister of Finance
- In office January 23, 1899 – May 7, 1899
- President: Emilio Aguinaldo
- Preceded by: Baldomero Aguinaldo
- Succeeded by: Hugo Ilagan

Secretary of War and Public Works
- In office May 7, 1899 – March 23, 1901
- President: Emilio Aguinaldo
- Preceded by: Baldomero Aguinaldo
- Succeeded by: Office abolished (Note: Title next held by Teofilo Sison as Secretary of National Defense and Antonio de las Alas as Secretary of Public Works and Communications.)

1st and 4th Governor of Cavite
- In office July 15, 1898 – August 10, 1898
- President: Emilio Aguinaldo
- Succeeded by: Emiliano Riego De Dios
- In office 1901–1903
- Governor: William Howard Taft; Luke Edward Wright
- Succeeded by: David C. Shanks

Personal details
- Born: Mariano Trías y Closas; October 12, 1869 San Francisco de Malabon, Cavite, Captaincy General of the Philippines, Spanish Empire (now General Trias, Cavite, Philippines)
- Died: January 22, 1914 (aged 45) Manila, Insular Government of the Philippine Islands, United States
- Party: Independent
- Spouse: María Concepción Ferrer
- Children: 8

Mariano Trías y Closas (Spanish: [ˈmaˈɾjano ˈtɾiˈas] : October 12, 1869 – January 22, 1914) is considered to be the first de facto Philippine Vice President of that revolutionary government established at the Tejeros Convention - an assembly of Philippine revolutionary leaders that elected officials of the revolutionary movement against the colonial government of Spain. When that assembly broke into factions, a truce known as the Pact of Biak-na-Bato was signed by the group and also recognized the elected officials and Trias as the vice president of Emilio Aguinaldo, who is also considered to be the first President of the Philippines. With the promulgation of the Malolos Constitution by the Malolos Convention, the First Philippine Republic was born. Under the Aguinaldo administration, Trias served in the cabinet initially as Secretary of Finance and, later, as Secretary of War.

He was married to María Concepción Ferrer with whom he had eight children.

== Early life ==
Mariano was the fifth of the nine children of Don Balbino Trías, a Cabeza de Barangay and Justice of the Peace during the Spanish regime who, after his term of office, become a landowner-farmer. His mother was Gabriela Closas. Through his paternal grandmother, Maria Dolores Gomez de Trias, he was also a grand-nephew of Fr. Mariano Gomes of the Gomburza.

He had primary schooling under the tutorship of Eusebio Chaves and Cipriano Gonzales, both local school teachers. Later, he was sent to Manila and enrolled at Colegio de San Juan de Letran for his Bachelor of Arts, then to University of Santo Tomas for his course in Medicine, which he was able to finish as he returned home to help his relatives manage the farm holdings.

== Independent movements and career ==
Before the revolution in August 1896, he joined the Katipunan and became an active propagandist in the towns of Silang and Kawit in Cavite. In the election of the Katipunan popular council, which was organized by the Sangguniang Balangay of Mapagtiis, he was named fiscal.

When two councils of the Katipunan revolutionist came into existence (namely, the Sangguniang Bayang Magdiwang and the Sangguniang Bayang Magdalo), both factions set up their respective councils of leaders. Trías became the Secretary of Justice and Grace of the Magdiwang group.

Assuming the nom-de-guerre 'Labong' (which means "bamboo shoots"), he recruited troops and solicited contributions from rich Filipinos in Indang and Alfonso, Cavite, to help finance the effect.

After he was criticized by the Magsaya council for establishing a public army, he joined the Magdalo.

== Vice-Presidency ==
On March 22, 1897, a second assembly of Katipunan leaders from both factions was held, this time at Tejeros, near the coast, in the heart of the Magdiwang territory. This happened while Emilio Aguinaldo and the Magdalo factions were desperately trying to stop the advancing of the Lachambre soldiers. After a stormy debate, it was agreed to set up a new government, replacing that of the Katipunan. Nine positions were to be filled. By secret ballot, Aguinaldo, who was absent, defending Imus against the forthcoming attack by General Jose de Lachambre, was elected president and Mariano Trías as vice president. Andrés Bonifacio was defeated for both positions.

At the revolutionary assembly convoked by Aguinaldo in Naic, Cavite on April 17, 1897, to complete his cabinet, Trías was again chosen as vice president. He led several attacks in Cavite and Laguna against Spanish forces. On January 23, 1899, the Biac-na-Bato Republic was established. Emilio Aguinaldo was president and Trías was vice-president.

== Later life and career ==
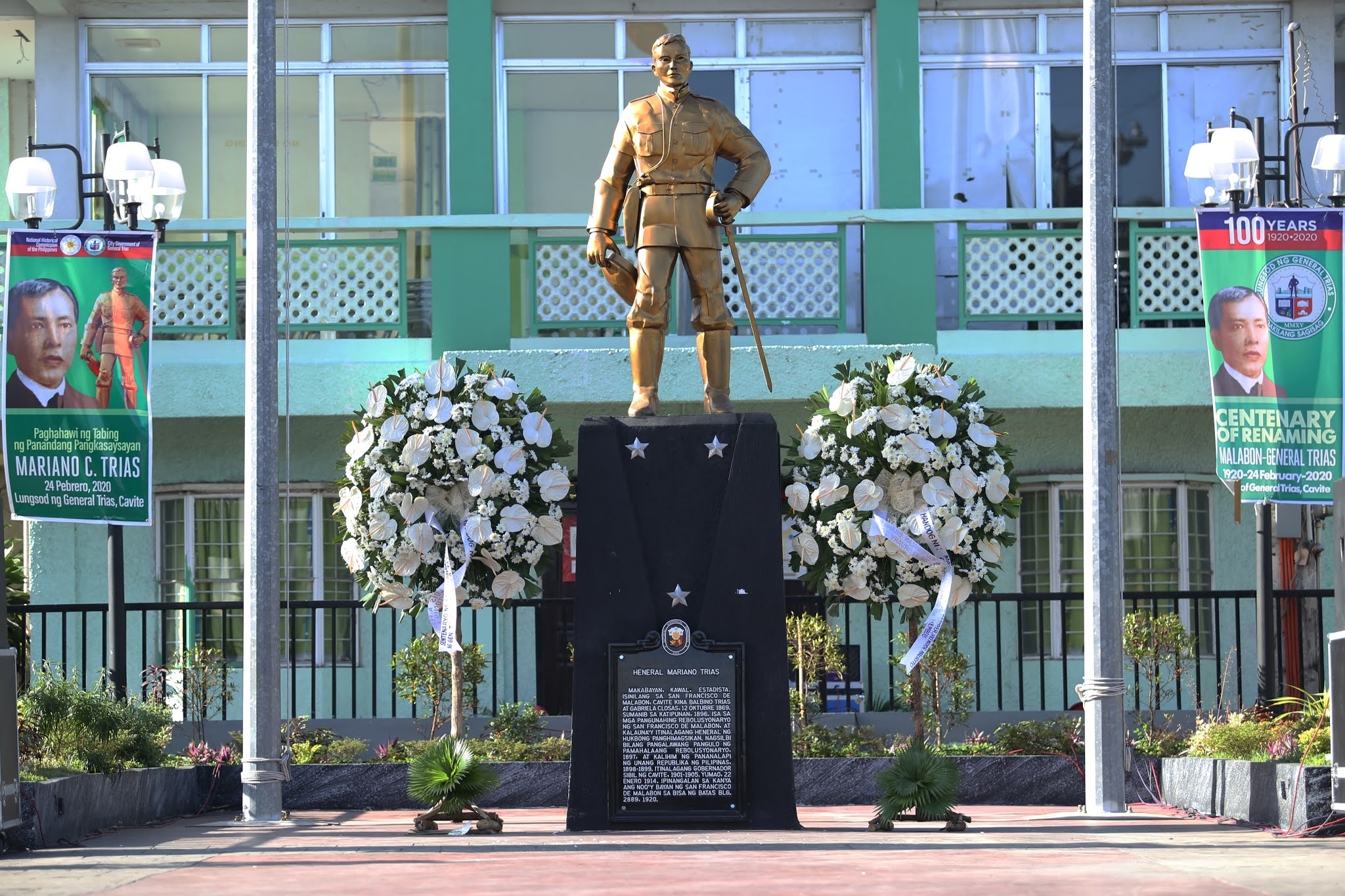
General Mariano Trias Monument in Cavite

After the abolition of the dictatorial government and the establishment of the revolutionary government, Mariano Trías was appointed on July 15, 1898, as Secretary of Finance and continued in this office after the transfer of seat of the government to Malolos. In the Paterno Cabinet, which succeeded the Mabini Cabinet, he held the position of Secretary of National Defense. After the revolutionary government forces were practically dispersed in Central Luzon, he was named commanding general of Southern Luzon. He directed guerrilla offensive moves in Cavite.

He figured in a series of furious skirmishes with the troops of General Loyd Wheaton in January 1900 when he held the defense of Cavite until his men were finally dispersed.

Trías set free all the Spanish prisoners under his command in May 1900.

Eight days before the capture of Aguinaldo, Trías, accompanied by former Secretary of the Interior Severino de las Alas, ex-governor of Cavite Ladislao Diwa, two colonels, two lieutenant colonels and a number of majors, captains, and lieutenants, and some hundreds of soldiers with guns, voluntarily surrendered in San Francisco de Malabón, Cavite to Lieutenant Colonel Frank D. Baldwin on March 15, 1901.

With the establishment of the civil government by the Americans, Civil Governor William Howard Taft appointed him the first Civil Governor of Cavite on June 11, 1901, in accordance with Act No. 139.

Trías was the founder of the Nacionalista Party chapter in Cavite. He supported the candidacy of Rafael Palma as assemblyman, representing the lone district of Cavite in 1907. In the general elections of 1912, Trías was responsible for the election of Antero S. Soriano and Florentino Joya as Governor and Representative, respectively, of Cavite.

The Grand Lodge of the Philippines lists Trías as a member.

He sailed to the United States as member of the honorary board of Filipino commissioners to the Louisiana Purchase Exposition in 1904. After his term of office, he engaged in agricultural activities, but this was a brief respite from politics. He was the acting governor of Cavite when he died of appendicitis at the Philippine General Hospital on February 22, 1914. He was buried in Manila. His remains were transferred to his hometown in 1923.

On February 24, 1920, the town of San Francisco de Malabon was renamed General Trias in his honor.

== Descendants ==
Mariano Trías had two brothers, Pedro and Maximino.

General Mariano Trías married María Concepción Ferrer with whom he had two children:

- Rafael (September 6, 1892 - February 27, 1970), married to Concepcion Magtibay, children Rafael Trias Jr., Francisco Trias, Gregorio Trias, Antonio Trias and Manuel Trias. Like his father before him, Rafael served as Governor of Cavite (1945-1946).
- Gabriel, married to Mercedes P. Trias.

As part of the bigger Gomez family that moved to Cavite in 1824 along with Fr. Mariano Gómes' assignment, he was also related to the Gomez family of Bacoor, Cavite. Later on, he would be related to its municipal mayor, Pablo Gomez Sarino, the son of his second cousin, Francisca Jaro Gomez de Sarino, who served from 1959-1967 and 1971-1986.

== Cultural portrayals ==
- Portrayed by John Arcilla in the 2012 film, El Presidente.

== Notes ==
Political offices
Preceded by Gregoria de Jesús (Unofficial) as Vice President of the Tagalog Republic	Vice President of Tejeros Republic; Unofficial Vice President of the Philippines; 1897–1899	Vacant Title next held by Francisco Carreón (Acting, Unofficial) as Vice President of the Tagalog Republic
Preceded by Baldomero Aguinaldo as Director of Finance	Secretary of Finance; 1899	Succeeded by Hugo Ilagan
Preceded by Baldomero Aguinaldo	Secretary of War and Public Works; 1899-1901	Succeeded by Teofilo Sison as Secretary of National Defense
Preceded by Baldomero Aguinaldo	Secretary of War and Public Works; 1899-1901	Succeeded by Antonio de las Alas as Secretary of Public Works and Communications
