= Hugo Ilagan =

Secretary of Finance of the Philippines in 1899

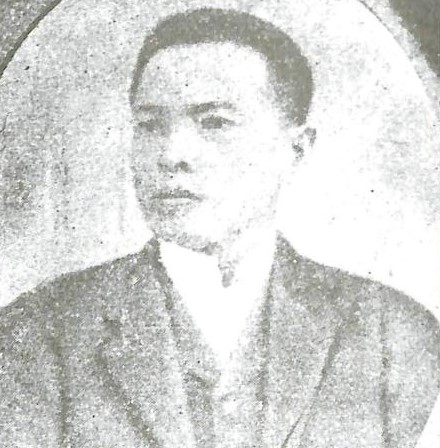

Secretary of Finance
- In office May 7 – November 13, 1899
- President: Emilio Aguinaldo
- Preceded by: Mariano Trías
- Succeeded by: Henry Clay Ide (as Secretary of Finance and Justice)

Member of the Malolos Congress
- In office September 15, 1898 – November 13, 1899 Serving with Jose Basa, Severino de las Alas, and Jose Salamanca
- Constituency: Cavite

Personal details
- Born: Hugo Lopez Ilagan; April 8, 1844 Indan, Cavite, Captaincy General of the Philippines
- Died: July 5, 1907 (aged 63)
- Education: University of Santo Tomas (LLB)

Hugo Ilagan y Lopez (April 8, 1844 – July 5, 1907) was a Filipino lawyer, politician, and government official. He served in the cabinet of Emilio Aguinaldo as secretary of finance from May to November 1899. He was also elected to the Malolos Congress as a representative of Cavite.

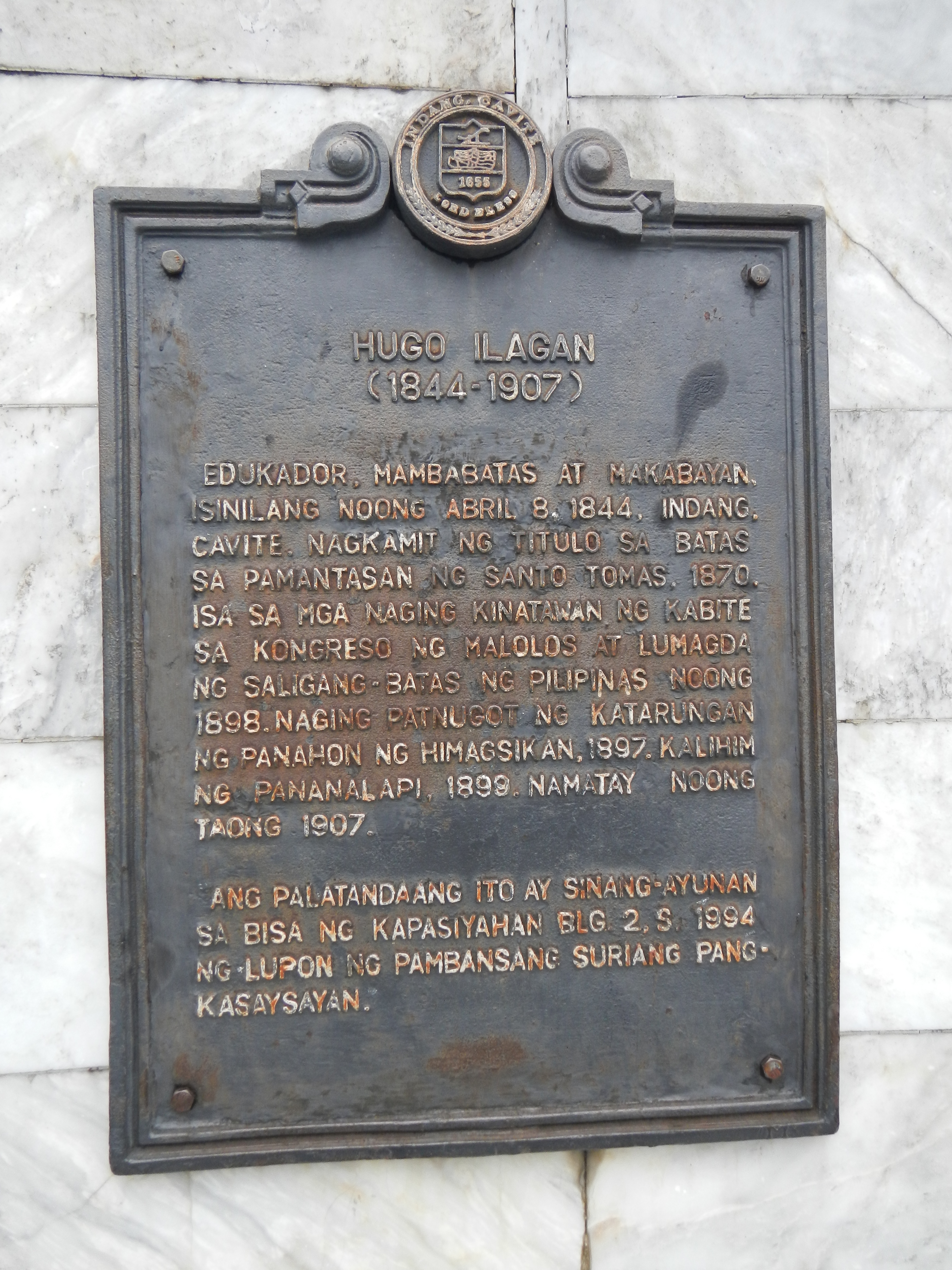
National historical marker installed in 1994 at his birthplace in Indang, Cavite

Ilagan was born on April 8, 1844, in Indan (now Indang), Cavite. He received his Bachelor of Laws degree from the University of Santo Tomas in 1870 and a Bachelor of Civil Law degree in 1874.

He was one of the signatories of the Malolos Constitution. In the first ballot for the election of the president of the Malolos Congress on September 15, 1898, Ilagan received five votes as a candidate, while fellow delegates Pedro Paterno and Antonio Luna received 24 and 23 votes, respectively. Paterno was elected president in the second ballot.

Ilagan died of a heart attack on July 5, 1907, at the age of 63.

Political offices
Preceded by Mariano Trías	Secretary of Finance; May 7 – November 13, 1899	Succeeded by Henry Clay Ide (as Secretary of Finance and Justice)
New district	Member of the Malolos Congress from Cavite; September 15, 1898 – November 13, 1899	Succeeded by Rafael Palma (as member of the Philippine Assembly from Cavite's at-large district)
