= Teodoro =

- Gender: Male

Origin
- Language: Italy

Other names
- Short form: Teo
- Nicknames: Teo, Doro, Tee, Ted, Teddy
- Related names: Theodore, Teodora, Theodora

The name Teodoro is the Italian, Portuguese and Spanish form of Theodore.

== People ==
=== Given name ===
- Teodoro Alcalde (1913–1995)
- Teodoro Ardemans (died 1726)
- Teodoro Borlongan (1955–2005)
- Teodoro Buontempo (1946–2013)
- Teodoro Cano García (born 1932)
- Teodoro Celli (1917–1989), music critic
- Teodoro Corrà (born 1996), actor
- Teodoro Correr (1750–1830)
- Teodoro Cottrau (1827–1879)
- Teodoro Cuñado (born 1970)
- Teodoro de Croix (1730–1792)
- Teodoro Fernandes Sampaio (1855–1937), Brazilian engineer, geographer and historiographer
- Teodoro Fernández (1913–1996)
- Teodoro García Simental (born 1974)
- Teodoro Ghisi (1536–1601)
- Teodoro Goliardi (1927–1997)
- Teodoro Kalaw (1884–1940)
- Teodoro Kalaw (sport shooter)
- Teodoro Lechi (1778–1866)
- Teodoro Locsin Jr. (born 1948)
- Teodoro Lonfernini (born 1976)
- Teodoro Maniaci
- Teodoro Matos Santana (1946–2013)
- Teodoro Mauri (1904–1960)
- Teodoro Moscoso (1932–1992)
- Teodoro Obiang Nguema Mbasogo (born 1942), president of Equatorial Guinea
- Teodoro Nguema Obiang Mangue (born 1968), Vice President of Equatorial Guinea and son of the President of Equatorial Guinea
- Teodoro Orozco (born 1963)
- Teodoro Palacios (1939–2019)
- Teodoro Paredes (born 1993)
- Teodoro Petkoff (1932–2018)
- Teodoro Plata (1866–1897)
- Teodoro R. Yangco (1861–1939)
- Teodoro Ramos Blanco (1902–1972) Afro-Cuban sculptor
- Teodoro Ribera
- Teodoro Sandiko (1860–1939)
- Teodoro Schwartz (1893–1968)
- Teodoro Vega (born 1976)

=== Surname ===
- Gilbert Teodoro (born 1964)
- Guilherme Teodoro (born 2001)
- John Iremil Teodoro (born 1973)
- Kesley Teodoro (born 1993)
- Lourdes Teodoro (born 1946)
- Lucimar Teodoro (born 1981)
- Manuel Teodoro (born 1963), journalist
- Manuel P. Teodoro, American political scientist
- Marcelino Teodoro (born 1970)
- Zé Teodoro (born 1963)

=== Characters ===
- Teodoro (Prison Break character), Theodore "T-Bag" Bagwell

== See also ==
- San Teodoro (disambiguation)
- Teodoro Sampaio (disambiguation)
