= Filemon Sotto =

Filipino politician

Filemón Yap Sotto
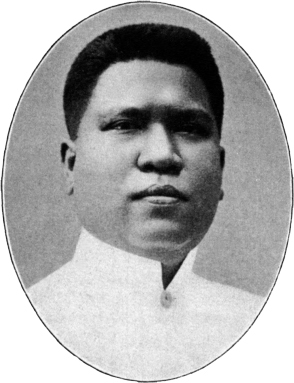
- Official portrait, c. 1917

Senator of the Philippines from the 10th district
- In office October 16, 1916 – June 6, 1922
- Preceded by: Position established
- Succeeded by: Sergio Osmeña

Member of the Philippine Assembly from Cebu's 3rd district
- In office 1907–1916
- Preceded by: Position created
- Succeeded by: Vicente Urgello (as representative)

Member of the 1934 Constitutional Convention
- In office July 30, 1934 – February 8, 1935

Municipal Vice President of Cebu
- In office 1903–1905
- Municipal President: Florentino Rallos
- Preceded by: Agapito Hilario
- Succeeded by: Luciano Bacayo

Personal details
- Born: Filemón Sotto é Yap; November 22, 1872 Cebu, Cebu, Captaincy General of the Philippines
- Died: October 10, 1966 (aged 93) Cebu City, Philippines
- Party: Popular Front (1941); Nacionalista (1907–1941); Independent (1903–1907)
- Spouse: Carmen Rallos y Fadullón
- Domestic partner: Remedios Duterte y Martínez
- Relations: Vicente Y. Sotto (brother)
- Children: Pascuala Sotto-Pahang
- Relatives: Sotto family
- Education: Colegio de San Carlos; Colegio de San Juan de Letran; University of Santo Tomas
- Profession: Lawyer; Publisher

Filemón Yap Sotto (Tagalog pronunciation: [ˈsɔtɔ]; November 22, 1872 – October 10, 1966) was a Filipino lawyer, legislator, and politician from Cebu, Philippines. He was a newspaper publisher and founded the periodicals El Imperial, Ang Kaluwasan, La Opinion, and La Revolucion. He served as member of Cebu municipal board, congressman of Cebu's 3rd district for the Philippine Assembly (1907–1916), senator of the Philippine Legislature (1916–1922), delegate to the 1934 Constitutional Convention, and delegate to the Institute of National Language (1937).

== Early life ==
Filemon Y. Sotto was born in Cebu, Philippines on November 22, 1872. The son of Marcelino Antonio Legaspi Sotto of Binondo, Manila and Pascuala Lim Yap-Sotto of Binondo, Manila, he was the elder brother of former Senator Vicente Y. Sotto, Sr. He acquired a bachelor's degree from Colegio de San Carlos and later attended San Juan de Letran College and the University of Santo Tomas, Manila, where he graduated with a law degree and passed the bar examinations in 1905. Musically-minded, he played guitar, violin, and violoncello.

== Personal life ==
In 1909, Filemon had a son with Cebuana beauty queen Remedios Duterte, but the child didn't survive. They bore another child, Pascuala Sotto, who was named after his mother and born on February 9, 1913. The couple separated ways. He married Carmen Rallos, continued to look after the welfare of Pascuala, paying for her education and needs, and even extended his generosity to her children.

During World War II, Filemon escaped to Carmen, Cebu with his family. When the war ended, he settled in Cebu City in a house constructed along V. Ranudo Street and when the property was sold, his family relocated to Lahug.

== Career ==
In 1903, he was voted as member and became vice president of the municipal board of Cebu. He was then appointed as fiscal for Negros Occidental and assistant fiscal for Cebu.

=== Newspapers ===
Aside from politics, Filemon published and edited periodicals such as La Revolucion, which saw its first print on August 5, 1910, and went in circulation until 1941. He also founded and published the newspapers El Imperial, Ang Kaluwasan, which was first printed in 1902, and La Opinion.

=== Philippine Assembly ===
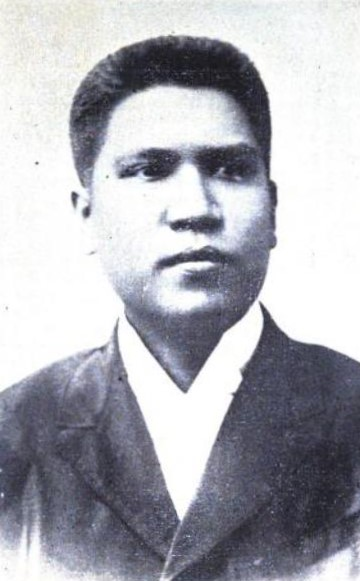
Sotto as a member of the Philippine Assembly, 1908

In 1907, he was elected representative to the Philippine Assembly for Cebu's 3rd district. He served in the 1st, 2nd and 3rd Philippine Legislature until 1916. Through the influence of the members of the Asociacion Feminista Ilonga (Feminist Association of Ilongo) that was formed by Pura Villanueva-Kalaw in 1906, he sponsored the first bill that would allow women the right of suffrage. It was not until 1936 that Filipino women were granted the right to vote under the administration of President Manuel L. Quezon.

=== Senate ===
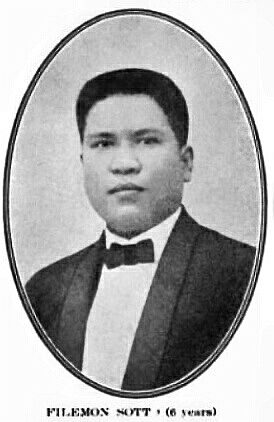
Sotto depicted from the Philippine Education, published April 1917

From 1916 until 1922, he was elected senator for two terms, serving together with Celestino Rodriguez in the Fourth Legislature and Fifth Legislature for Cebu, which was the 10th senatorial district. At that time, the Philippines was split into 12 senatorial districts, with each district voting two senators.

=== Constitutional Convention ===
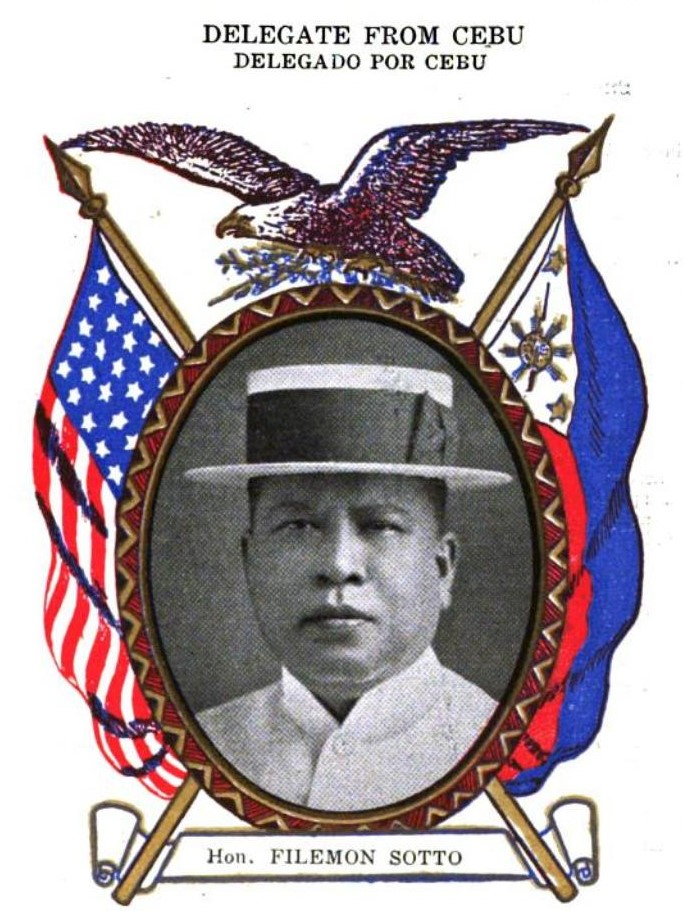
Photograph published by Benipayo Press, c. 1935

By 1934, when the United States Congress approved the Philippine Independence Act which would pave the way for the creation of the Philippine Constitution, Filemon was elected as delegate to the Constitutional Convention. On October 9, 1934, he was appointed and became chairman of the group called Seven Wise Men that included Conrado Benitez Manuel C. Briones, Manuel Roxas, Miguel Cuaderno, Norberto Romualdez, and Vicente Singson Encarnacion, who had significant contribution to the draft of the 1935 Constitution. He submitted the first draft to the convention on November 6, 1934.

=== Institute of National Language ===
On January 12, 1937, he was appointed as delegate of the Institute of National Language, which was created by virtue of Commonwealth Act No. 184, by then President Manuel L. Quezon. The government body, the first of its kind, was tasked to develop the Philippine national language.

== Later years ==
On November 25, 1960, Pascuala would later petition the courts to recognize her as natural child of Filemon, and the Supreme Court decided in her favor on July 15, 1968. Filemon died in Cebu City on October 10, 1966.

== Historical commemoration ==
- Filemon Y. Sotto Drive, which starts from Gorordo Avenue to Maxilom Avenue, in Cebu City was named in his honor by virtue of City Ordinance No. 1123.
