= Sampaio (disambiguation) =

Sampaio is a municipality in the state of Tocantins, Brazil.

Sampaio may also refer to:

== People ==
=== Brazilians ===
- Anderson Gils de Sampaio (born 1977), football player
- Ângelo Sampaio Benedetti (born 1981), football player
- Augusto Sampaio, computer scientist
- César Sampaio (born 1968), football player and director
- Estefane Sampaio (born 2000), Brazilian politician
- Georgina Pires Sampaio (1917–1985), dancer better known as Suzy King
- Olinto Sampaio Rubini (1934–2012), football player
- Philipe Sampaio (born 1994), football player
- Plínio de Arruda Sampaio (1930–2014), politician
- Rogério Sampaio (born 1967), judoka
- Teodoro Fernandes Sampaio (1855–1937), Brazilian engineer, geographer and historiographer
- Tercio Sampaio Ferraz Jr., jurist and writer
- Paulo Henrique Sampaio Filho, better known as Paulinho, Brazilian footballer
- Pedro Sampaio (born 1997), singer and music producer

=== Portuguese ===
- António Rodrigues Sampaio (1806–1882), politician
- António de Sampaio da Nóvoa, psychologist and professor
- Caetano Luís Pequito de Almeida Sampaio (born 1957), diplomat
- Carlos Sampaio Garrido (1883–1960), diplomat
- Gonçalo Sampaio (1865–1937), botanist
- Helena Sampaio (runner) (born 1973), runner
- Jorge Sampaio (1939–2021), lawyer, politician and president of Portugal
- Lopo Vaz de Sampaio (c. 1480–1534), politician and sailor
- Nélson Sampaio (born 1992), football player
- Rui Sampaio (born 1987), football player
- Sara Sampaio (born 1991), model
- Tiago Sampaio Romão (born 1999), Portuguese trampoline gymnast

== Places in Brazil ==
- General Sampaio, a municipality in the state of Ceará
- Sampaio, Rio de Janeiro, a neighborhood in the municipality of Rio de Janeiro

== Sport in Brazil ==
- Estádio Mauro Sampaio, the home stadium of the football team Icasa
- Grêmio Atlético Sampaio, a football team from Boa Vista, Roraima
- Sampaio Corrêa Futebol Clube, a football team from São Luís, Maranhão
- Sampaio Corrêa Futebol e Esporte, a football team from Saquarema, Rio de Janeiro
