= Purita Kalaw Ledesma =

Filipino writer and art critic (1914–2005)

Purita V. Kalaw-Ledesma
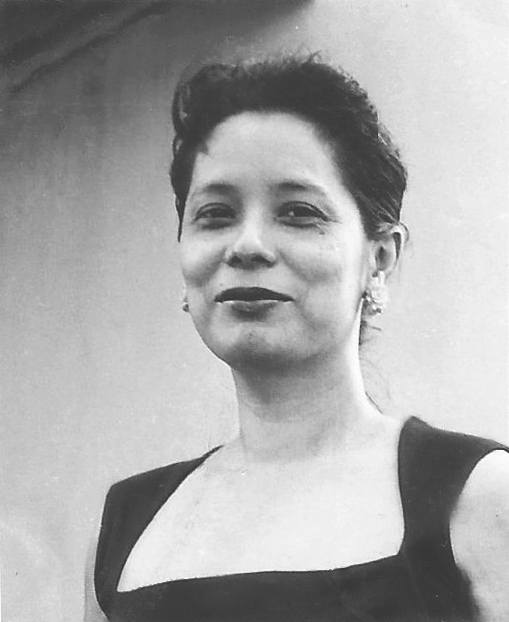
- Born: Purita Villanueva Kalaw; February 2, 1914; Manila, Philippine Islands
- Died: April 29, 2005 (aged 91); Manila, Philippines
- Education: University of the Philippines; University of Michigan
- Occupations: Writer, art critic
- Spouse: Rafael Ledesma (m. 1937)
- Children: 4
- Relatives: Maria V. Kalaw-Katigbak (sister); Eva R. Estrada-Kalaw (sister-in-law); Pura G. Villanueva-Kalaw (mother); Teodoro M. Kalaw, Sr. (father)

Purita Villanueva Kalaw-Ledesma (February 2, 1914 – April 29, 2005) was a writer and art critic and founder of the Art Association of the Philippines in 1948.

== Early life ==
Purita Villanueva Kalaw-Ladesma was born in Manila on February 2, 1914, to government official Teodoro M. Kalaw, Sr. (1884-1940), who at the time served as representative from Batangas, and journalist and beauty queen, Purificacion "Pura" Villanueva-Kalaw (1886-1954). Her mother Pura was a prominent writer and suffragist. Purita's sister Maria V. Kalaw-Katigbak became a senator, as did their sister-in-law Eva R. Estrada-Kalaw. Purita Kalaw studied fine arts at the University of the Philippines and pursued further studies in art and design at the University of Michigan. She held two master's degrees, one in education and one in art education, the latter completed when she was 72 years old.

== Career ==
In 1948, Purita V. Kalaw-Ledesma founded the Art Association of the Philippines and became president of the organization. Kalaw Ledesma also managed the family real estate company, L. P. Kalaw, Inc., and attended a conference in Boston in that capacity in 1960.

Books by Kalaw Ledesma include The Struggle for Philippine Art (1974, with Amadis Maria Guerrero); Edades: National Artist (1979, with Amadis Maria Guerrero, about Victorio Edades); The Biggest Little Room (1987, about the Philippine Art Gallery); and And Life Goes On (1994, an autobiography). Her 1955 essay "A Critical Analysis of Modern Painting in the Philippines Today" is still considered an important text on the subject. She also published a cookbook, Family Recipes, in the 1980s.

== Personal life and legacy ==
Purita V. Kalaw married Rafael Ledesma. They had four daughters, Rita, Consuelo, Ada, and Lourdes. Kalaw Ledesma experienced a debilitating stroke in 2000 and died in April 2005, aged 91 years.

In 2010 there was an exhibit of works by Filipino artists from Kalaw Ledesma's personal collection, held at the Ayala Museum in Makati. There is a Purita Kalaw Ledesma Prize for Art Criticism, presented by the Ateneo Art Gallery and the Kalaw-Ledesma Foundation, "to foster critical public discussion about exhibitions and artworks."
