= Teodoro Sampaio (disambiguation) =

Teodoro Sampaio (1855–1937) was Brazilian engineer, geographer and historiographer.

Teodoro Sampaio may also refer to:

- Teodoro Sampaio, Bahia, a municipality in the state of Bahia, Brazil
- Teodoro Sampaio, São Paulo, a municipality in the state of São Paulo, Brazil

== See also ==
- Sampaio (disambiguation)
