= Teodori =

Teodori is an Italian surname, the plural form of the more popular Teodoro. Notable people with the surname include:

- Massimo Teodori (born 1938), Italian author and politician
- Muriel Téodori (born 1958), French psychoanalyst

== Religion ==
- Teodori, a part of the Service with music and dance in the Tenrikyo religion
