= Purita =

Purita is both a given name and surname of Spanish origin. Notable people with the name include:

People with the surname:

- Emiliano Purita (born 1997), Argentine professional footballer

People with the given name:

- Purita Campos (1937–2019), Spanish comics artist and painter
- Purita Kalaw Ledesma (1914–2005), Philippine writer and art critic
- Purita Macapagal (1938-1943), first wife of Philippine President Diosdado Macapagal
