= Pura Villanueva Kalaw =

Filipino writer and journalist

Pura G. Villanueva-Kalaw
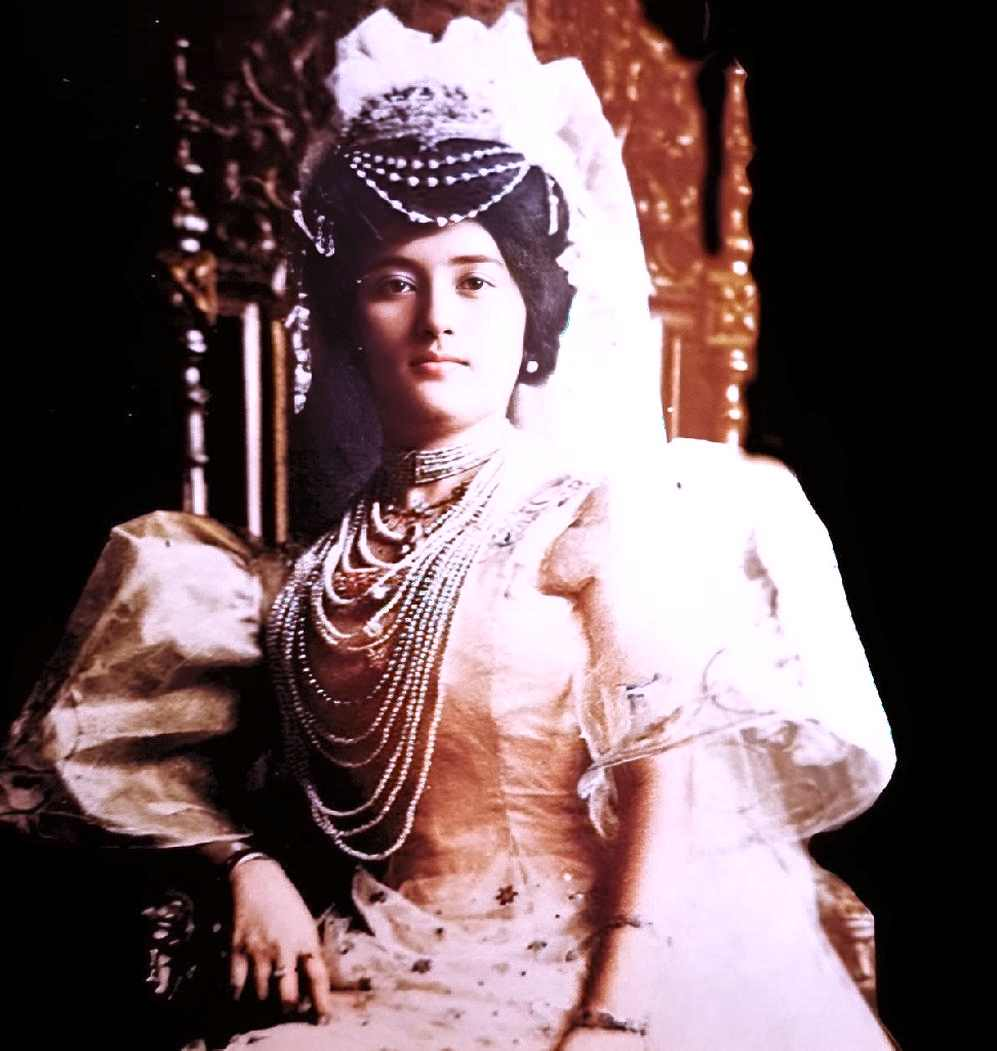
- Born: 27 August 1886; Arevalo, Iloilo, Captaincy General of the Philippines
- Died: 21 March 1954 (aged 67); Manila, Philippines
- Citizenship: Filipino
- Occupations: Writer and journalist
- Spouse: Teodoro M. Kalaw Sr. (m. 1910; died 1940)
- Children: 4 (including Maria V. Kalaw-Katigbak and Purita V. Kalaw-Ladesma)

Purificacion "Pura" Garcia Villanueva-Kalaw (27 August 1886 – 21 March 1954) was a Filipina beauty queen, feminist, journalist, and writer.

In March 2026, Philippine Daily Inquirer enlisted her as one of "the Filipina 'firsts' [who] rarely appear in textbooks, but their contributions helped change the course of history and widened opportunities for women" alongside Ignacia del Espíritu Santo, Luisa Gonzaga de León, Martha de San Bernardo, Librada Avelino, Asunción Ventura, Consuelo Padilla Osorio and Honorata de la Rama.

== Early life ==
Purificacion Garcia Villanueva was born in the town of Arevalo, Iloilo to Emilio Villanueva and Emilia Garcia. Her mother was born in Palencia, Spain. In 1908, at age 22, Pura Villanueva became the first "Queen of the Manila Carnival."

== Career ==
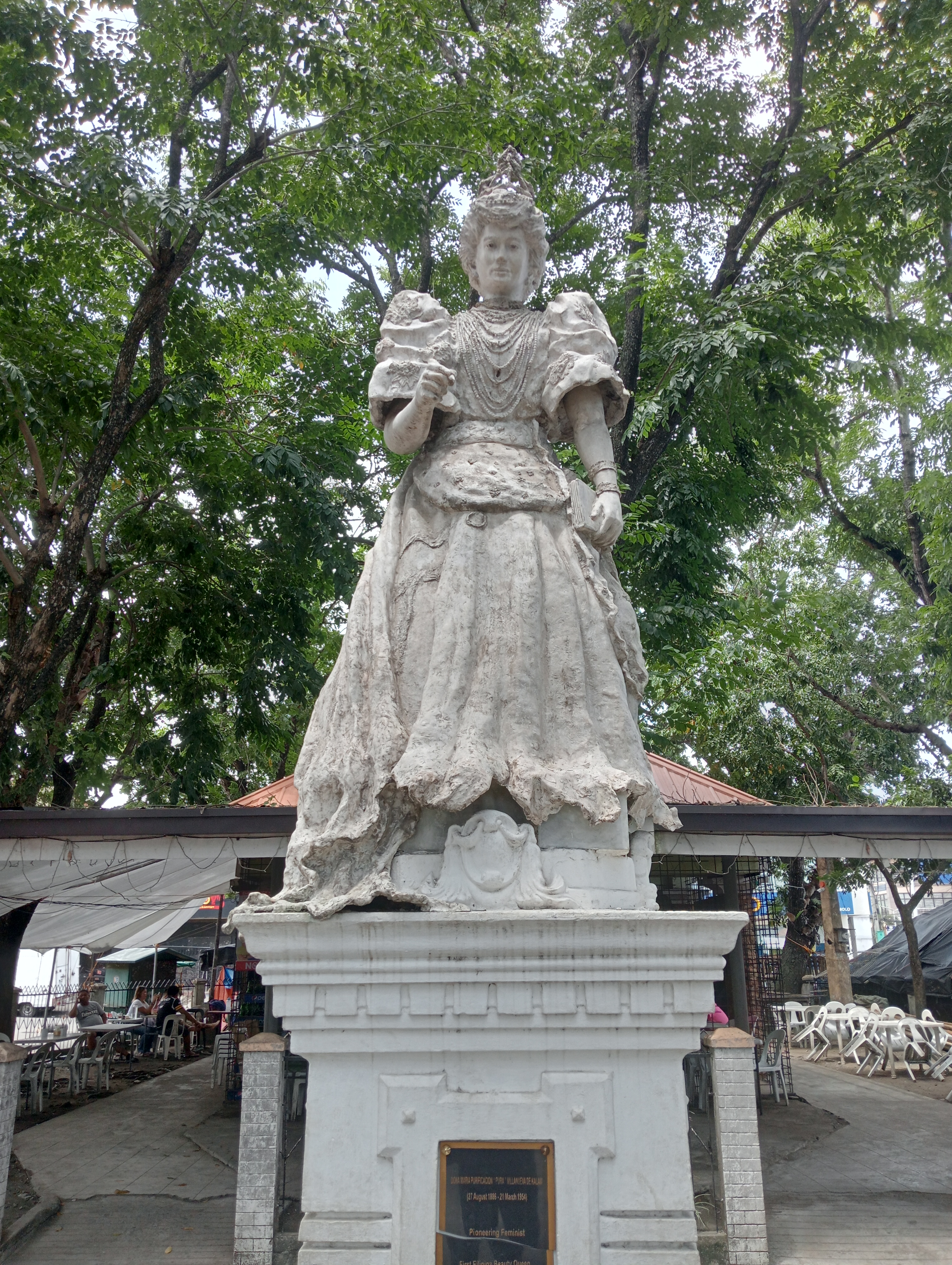
Doña Pura Villanueva Monument, Molo, Iloilo City

In 1906 Pura Villanueva organized a suffrage group, the Asociacion Feminista Ilonga. Her efforts led to the first suffrage bill reaching the Philippine Assembly in 1907. Pura Villanueva wrote a column for the weekly newspaper El Tiempo, and edited the woman's page. Later she edited the Spanish-language section of Woman's Outlook, a pro-suffrage publication (Trinidad Fernandez Legarda was the English-language editor). She was also president of the Women's Club of Manila.

Books by Pura Villanueva Kalaw included Osmeña From Newspaperman to President (1946), How the Filipina Got the Vote, Outstanding Filipino Women, Anthology of Filipino Women Writers, The Consumer Cooperatives in the Philippines, The Filipino Cookbook, and A Brief History of the Filipino Flag. Her 1918 booklet Condimentos Indigenas was "one of the earliest cookbooks" published in the Philippines.

In 1951, Pura Villanueva Kalaw was honored with a Presidential Medal, presented by President Elpidio Quirino, for her work on behalf of women's rights in the Philippines.

== Personal life ==
Pura G. Villanueva-Kalaw married lawyer and editor Teodoro M. Kalaw Sr. in 1910. Their children included Maria V. Kalaw-Katigbak, a senator, and Purita V. Kalaw-Ladesma, an art critic. Their daughter-in-law Eva R. Estrada-Kalaw was also a senator. Pura G. Villanueva-Kalaw became a widow in 1940.

== Death ==
She died on 21 March 1954 at the age of 67.

== Legacy ==
Her daughter Maria V. Kalaw-Katigbak published a biography, Legacy: Pura Villanueva Kalaw: Her Times, Life, and Works 1886–1954 in 1983. Pura V. Kalaw was one of the suffragists featured in a 2016 exhibit at the Philippine Embassy in Washington, D.C.

There is a school in Quezon City named for Pura V. Kalaw.
