= Maximo Kalaw =

Filipino political scientist and novelist

Maximo Manguiat Kalaw
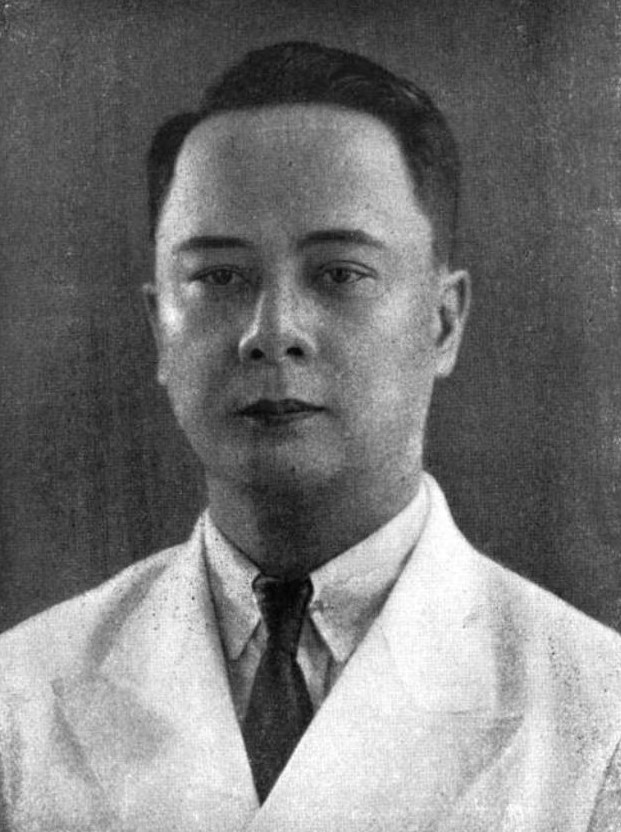
- Photograph from The Commercial & Industrial Manual of the Philippines, 1941

Secretary of Instruction and Information
- In office March 8, 1945 – May 4, 1945
- President: Sergio Osmeña
- Preceded by: Carlos P. Romulo
- Succeeded by: Jose Reyes

Member of the National Assembly from Batangas's Third District
- In office September 16, 1935 – December 30, 1941 (Note: District dissolved into the two-seat Batangas's at-large district for the National Assembly (Second Philippine Republic).)
- Preceded by: Emilio Mayo
- Succeeded by: Position abolished Position next held by Jose Laurel Jr.

Personal details
- Born: May 20, 1891 Lipa, Batangas, Captaincy General of the Philippines
- Died: March 23, 1954 (aged 62) Calapan, Oriental Mindoro, Philippines
- Party: Nacionalista
- Education: George Washington University (AB); Georgetown University (LLB); University of Michigan (PhD)
- Occupation: Political scientist, educator, author
- Known for: First Filipino head of the Department of Political Science, University of the Philippines

Academic work
- Notable works: The Philippine Revolution; The Present Government of the Philippines; Democracy in the Philippines

Maximo Valerio Manguiat Kalaw (May 20, 1891 – March 23, 1954) was a Filipino political scientist and novelist. He was the first Filipino head of the Department of Political Science at the University of the Philippines. He argued for Filipino independence from the United States. He also served as assemblyman for Batangas's 3rd district from 1935 to 1941 and Secretary of Instruction and Information in 1945.

He was born in the town of Lipa, Batangas, in the Philippines. He was the brother of Teodoro Kalaw. He studied at the George Washington University and Georgetown University. In 1924, he received a PhD from the University of Michigan. He was Dean of the College of Liberal Arts of the University of the Philippines from 1920-1936.

== Works ==
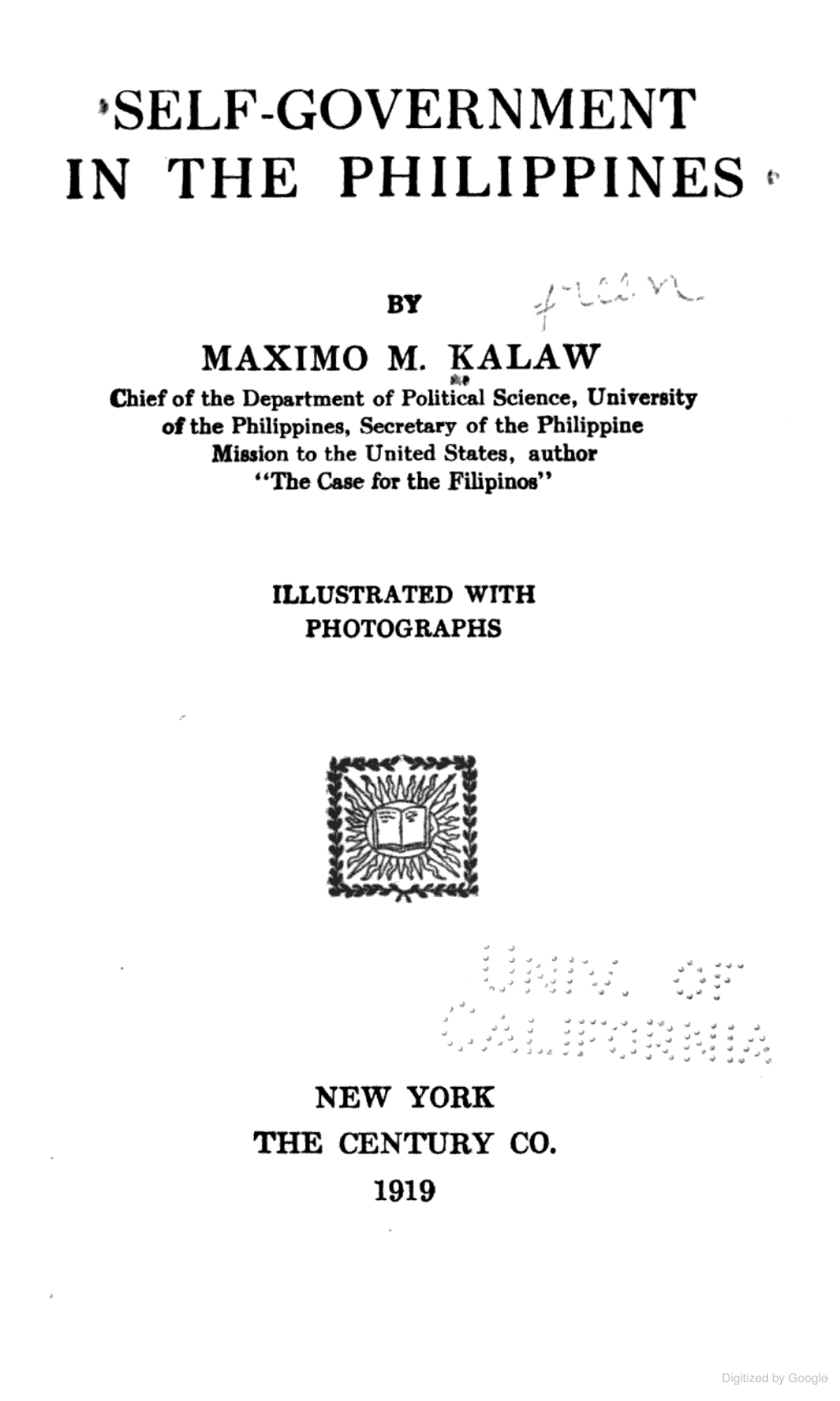
Title cover of his 1919 book, Self-Government in the Philippines

Kalaw wrote numerous popular articles and essays to newspapers. He also published many articles in learned or professional journals. Some of the books he made include:

- The Case for the Filipinos (1916)
- Self-Government in the Philippines (1919)
- The Development of Philippine Politics (1926)
- Philippine Government Under the Jones Law (1927)
- The Filipino Rebel, a novel (1930)
- Philippine Government (1948)
