= Manila Carnival =

Philippine festival (1908–1939)

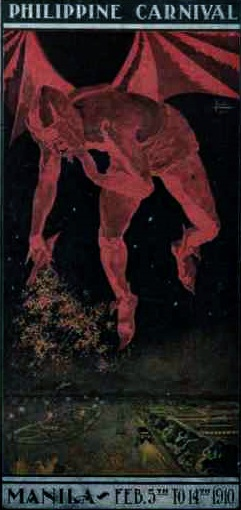
- Promotional material released for the 1910 Manila Carnival
- Genre: Festival
- Frequency: Annual
- Venue: Wallace Field
- Location: Manila
- Country: Philippine Islands (Philippine Commonwealth; from 1935 to 1939)
- Years active: 1908–1939 (31 years)
- Major events: Beauty pageant, carnival, fair, and exposition

Manila Carnival was an annual carnival festival held in Manila during the early American colonial period up to the time before the Second World War. It was organized by the American colonial administration to showcase the economic development of the Philippines. The highlight of the event is the crowning of the Carnival Queens.

== History ==
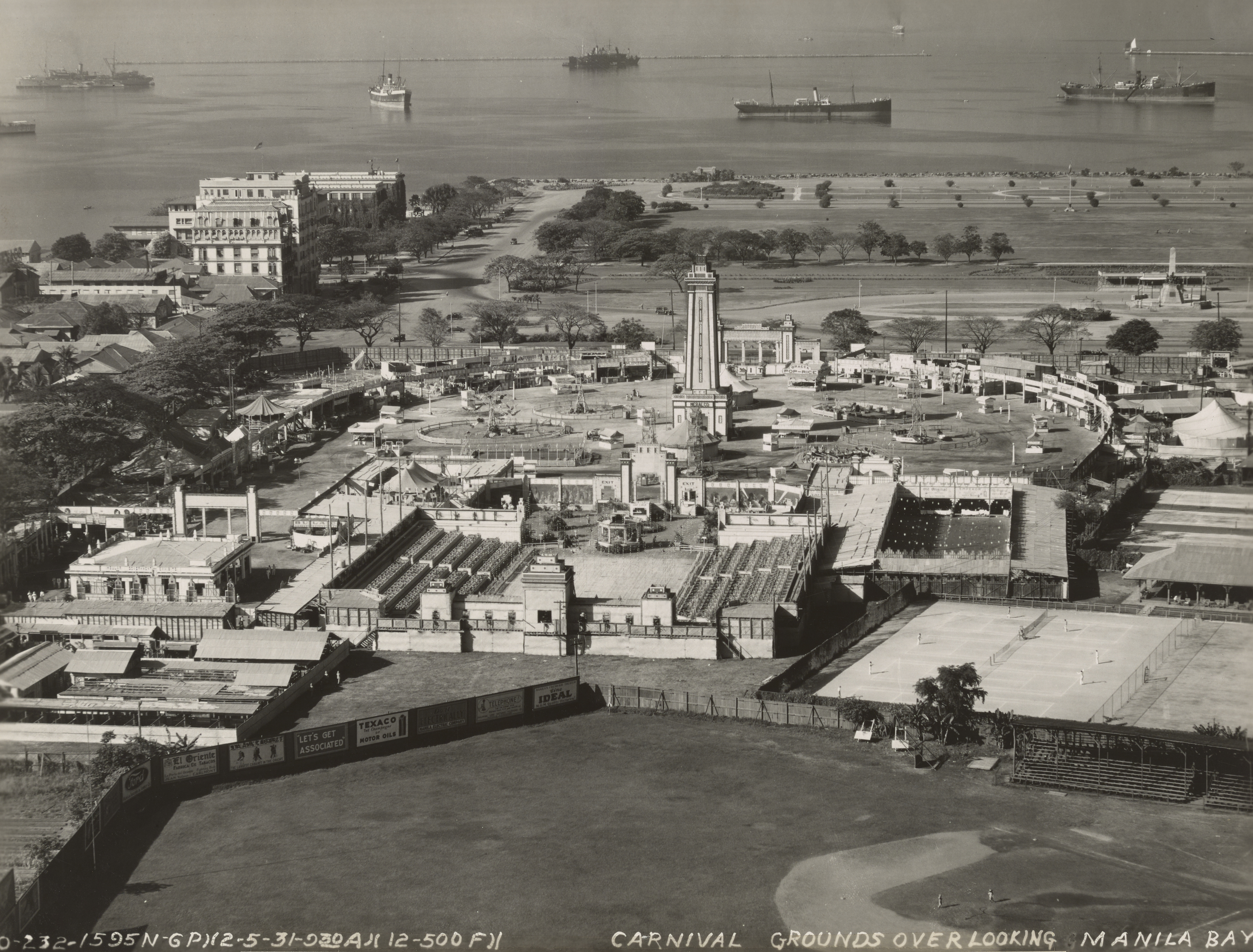
Manila Carnival Ground at Wallace Field (present-day Rizal Park), Manila in 1931.

The Manila Carnival was first held in February 1908. The carnival's original organizer was an American colonel named George T. Langhorne who asked the Philippine Assembly for 50,000 pesos to build a cockpit, exhibit "half-naked" Igorot tribesmen and set up curiosities. Horrified by the plan of the proposed carnival, Governor-General James Smith transformed the planned freak show into a ritual celebrating the Philippine-American progress in the islands. Secretary of Commerce Cameron Forbes took charge of the preparation and asked 15,000 instead of 50,000 from the Assembly. He planned to raise another 15,000 by private subscription campaigns such as the Carnival Queen contest.

The site of the Manila Carnival was the old Wallace Field that was just off the present Luneta Park.

During those two weeks of carnival, Wallace Field was walled with amakan and given a decorative façade brilliant with lights and adornments. A variety of shows were presented like circus, vaudevilles, slapstick comedies, and the grand theatrical presentation of Borromeo Lou, the great impresario of the era. Starts such as Atang de la Rama, Katy de la Cruz, Canuplin, and Dionisia Castro often staged performances that audiences loved.

The entrance fee ranges from 50 centavos and up and one can buy at the gate a mask, a horn, and a bag of confetti. The children wore a harlequin costume, a clown costume, or a dunce hat, while older ones wore dominoes or similar attractive attires.

The scene was like New Year's Eve with all the gaiety, laughter and gossips in old Manila circling around. Everyone seemed to be tooting horns or throwing confetti.

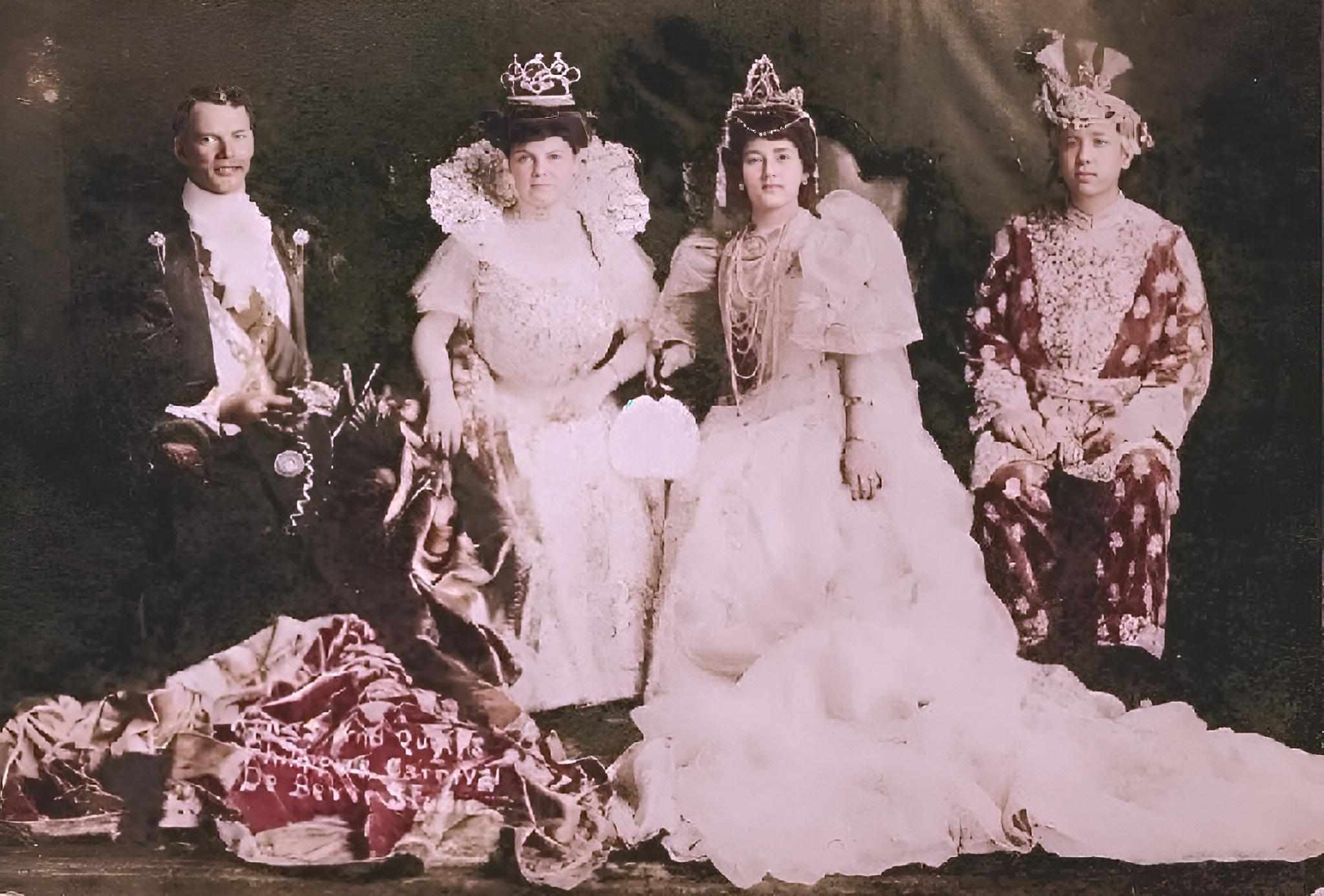
Oriental Queen - Pura Villanueva and Occidental Queen - Marjorie Colton, with their consorts Col. George T. Langhorne and Manuel Gomez, who strayed away from the regalized traditional Filipino attire theme of the event and dressed as Indian Maharajas.

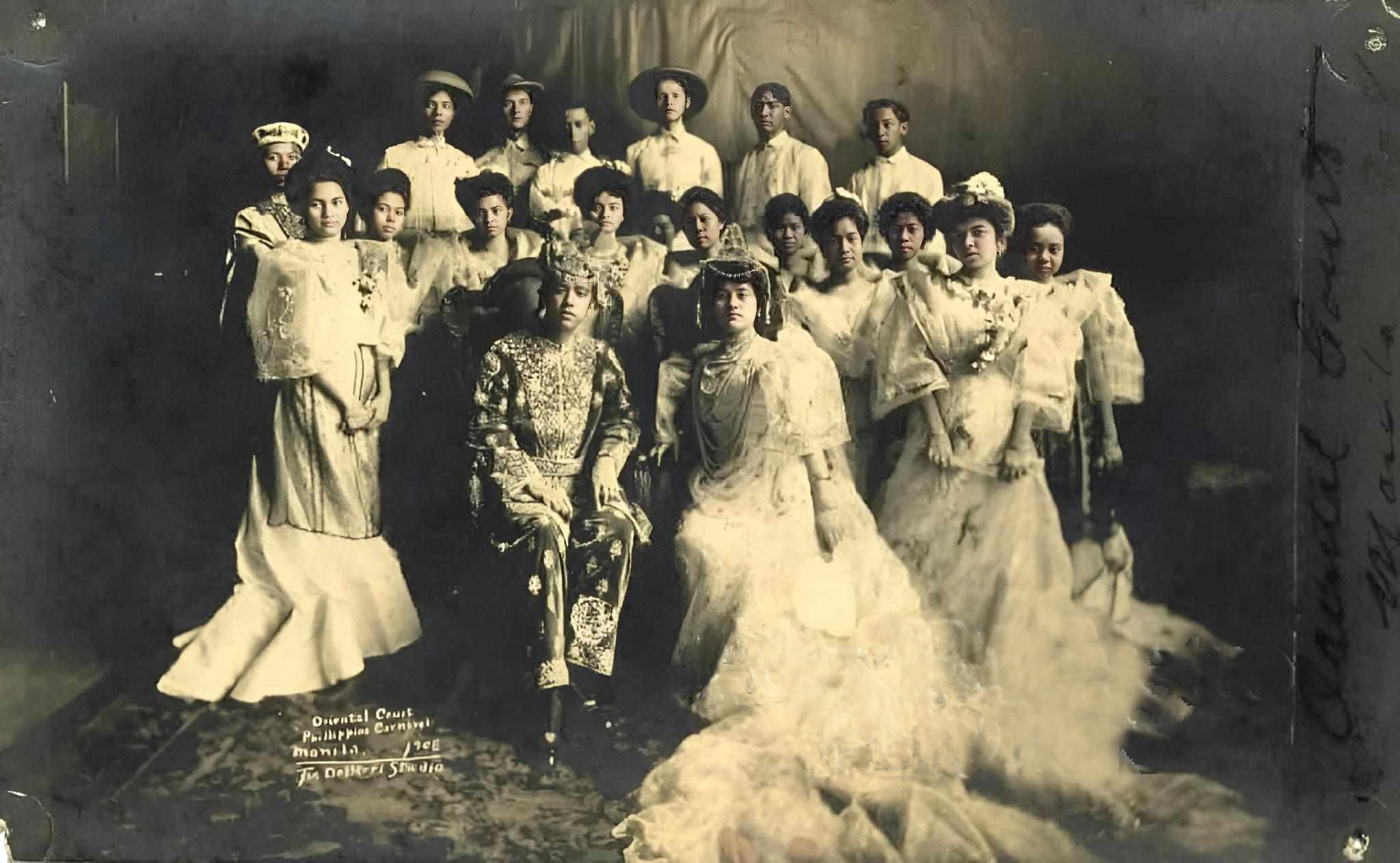
Manila Carnival 1908

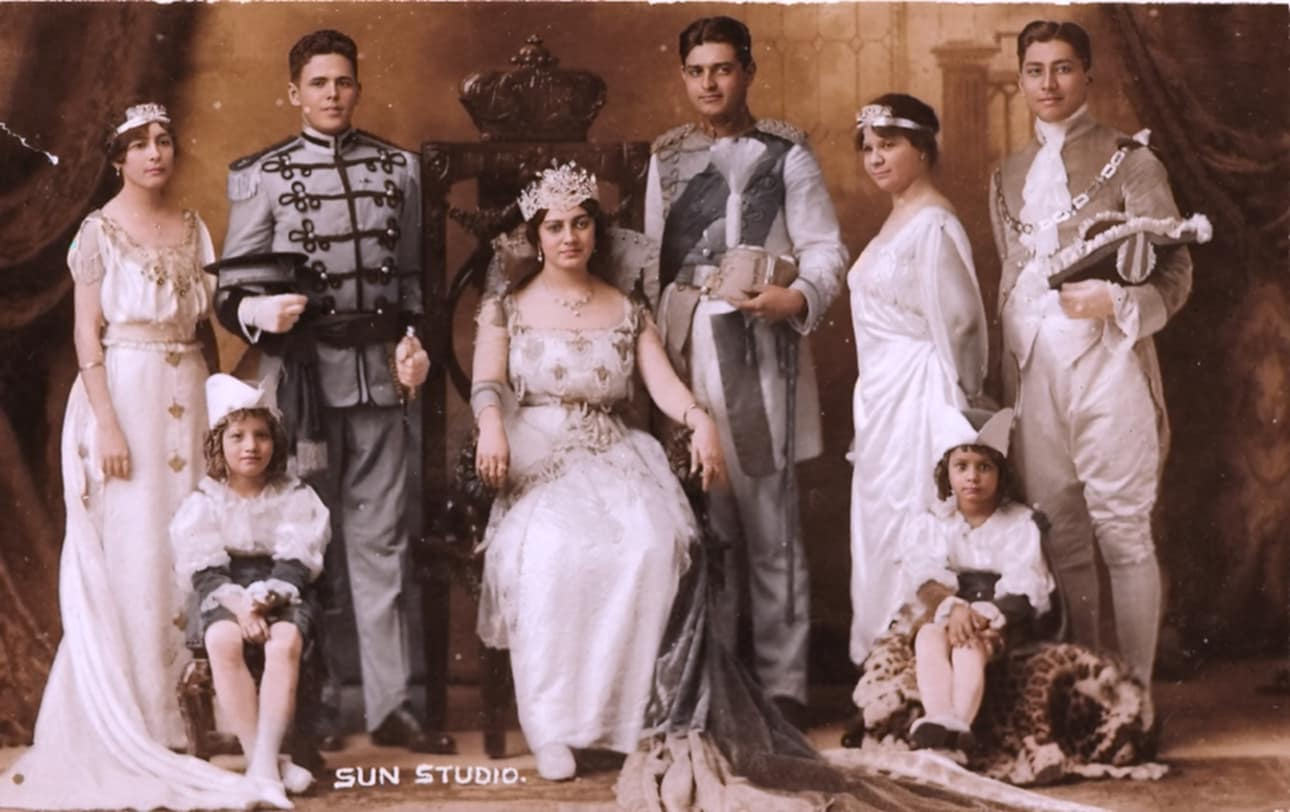
Manila Carnival 1918 Queen Enriqueta Aldanese of Cebu and Court

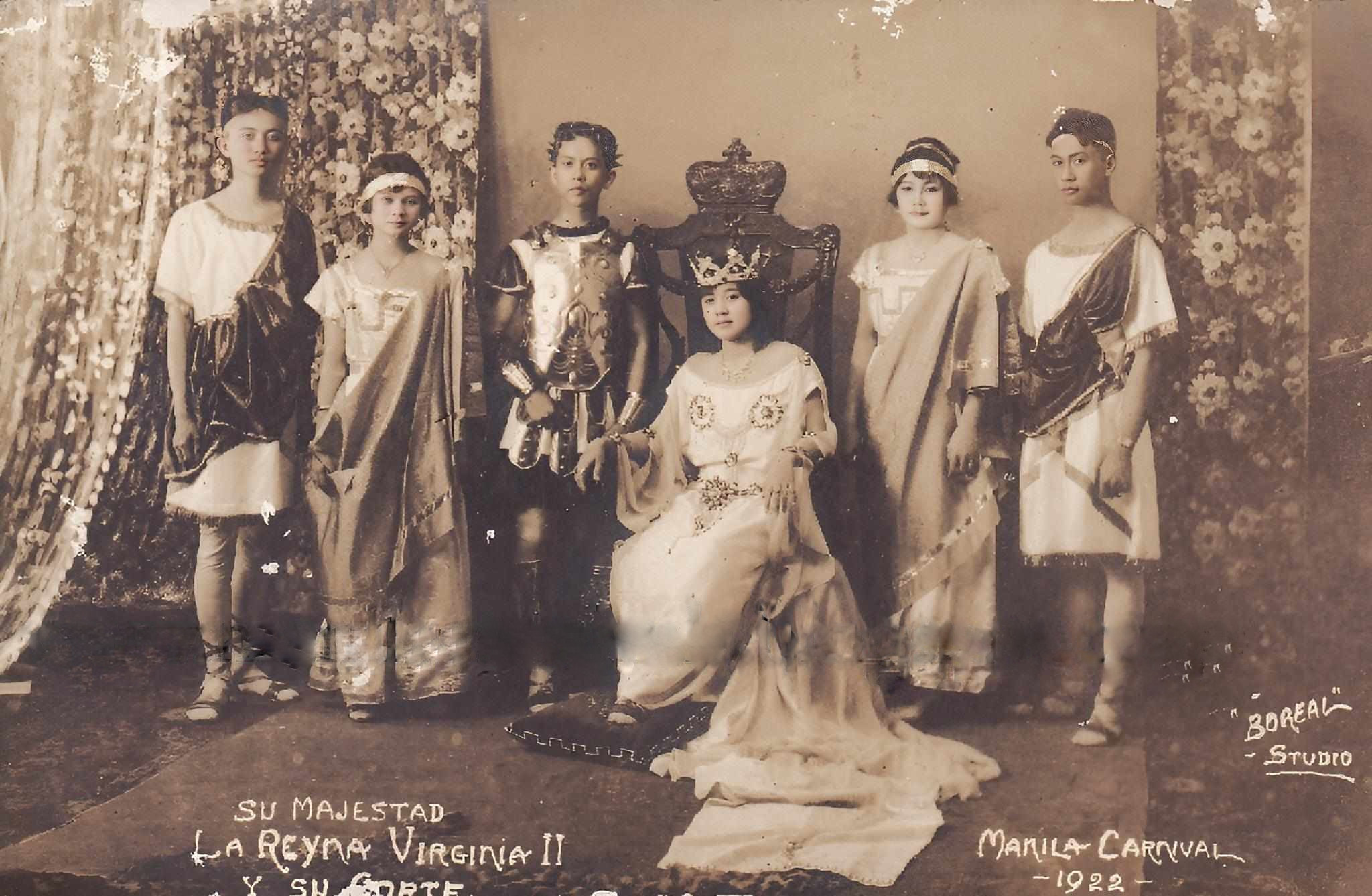
1922 Manila Carnival Queen, Virginia Llamas y Vidal wearing Filipinized Greco-Roman dress from their ancient Roman theme.

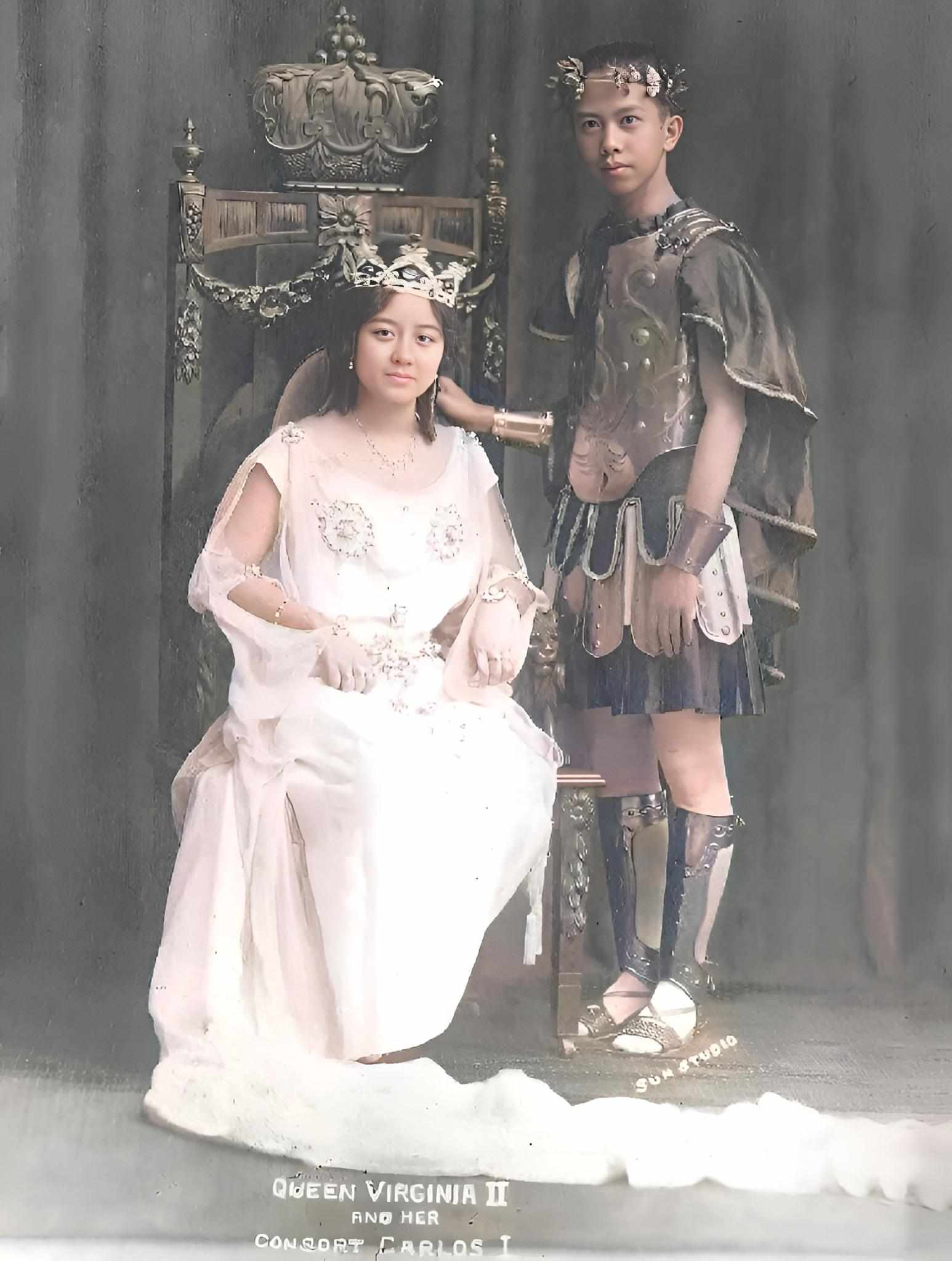
Young Carlos P. Romulo and Virginia Llamas in Greco-Roman theme 1922

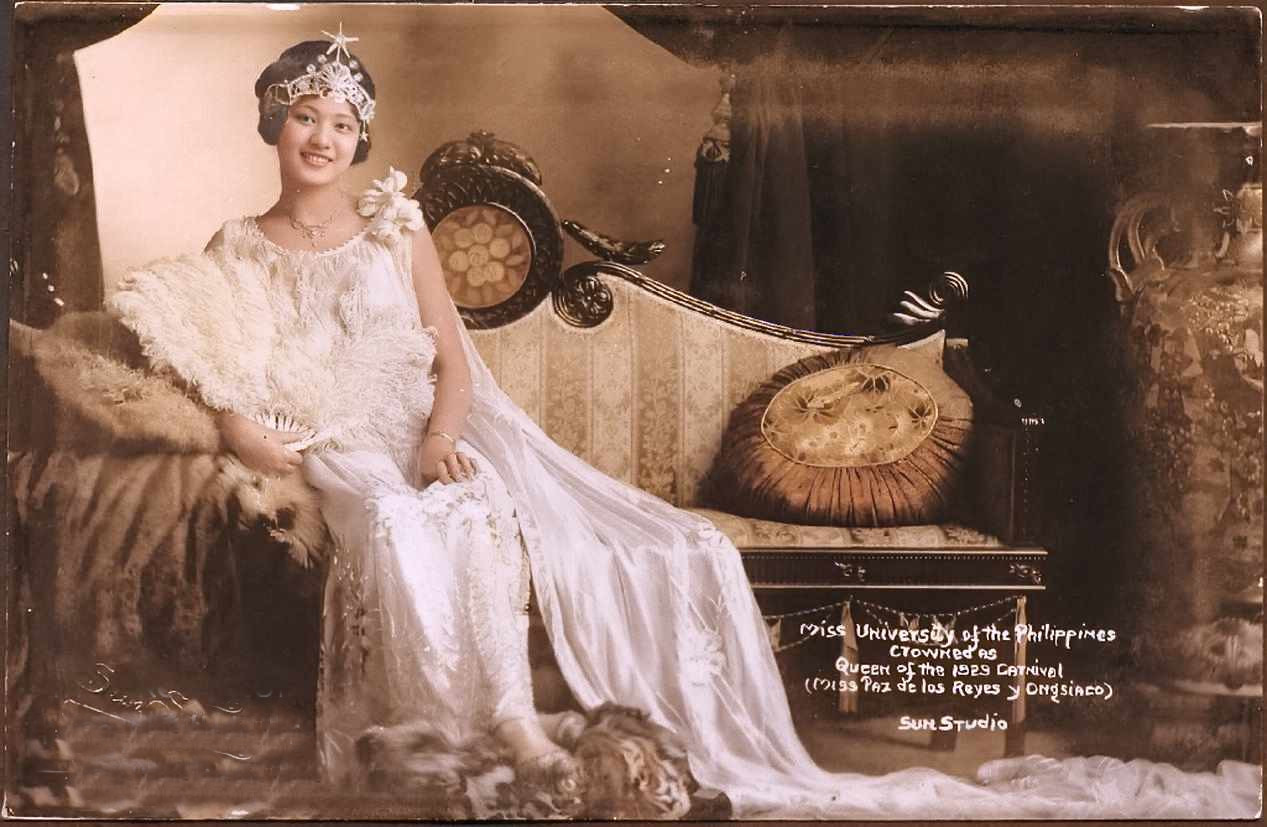
Pacita Ongsiako delos Reyes - The Philippine' Manila Carnival Queen 1929

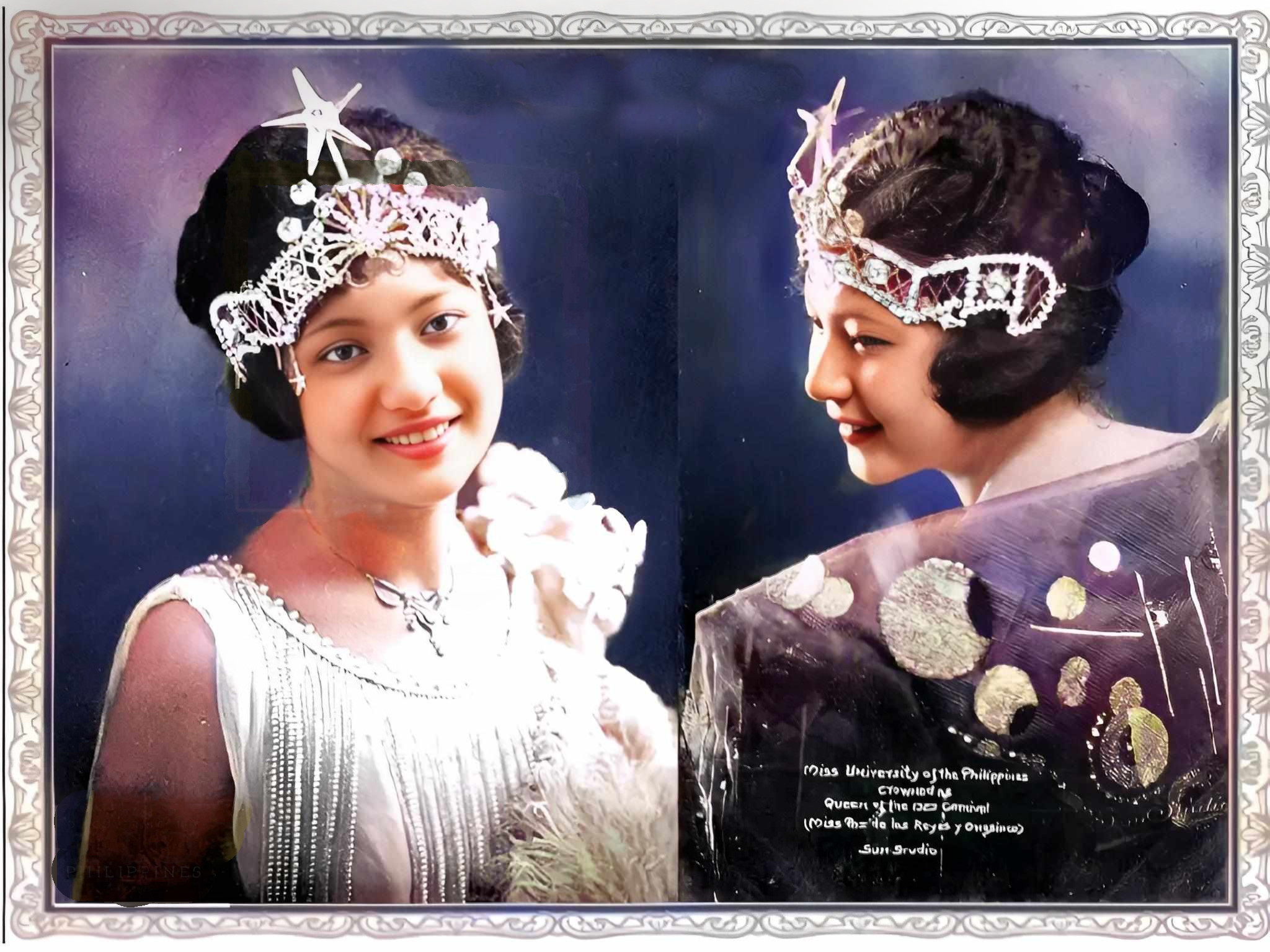
Pacita delos Reyes

=== Parades ===
There were five parades during the carnival season:

1. The opening day parade, which was mostly clown and circus
2. The military parade, mostly Americans and Scouts
3. The civic educational parade in which the public schools of Manila participated, and wherein each school compete for the best and most original floats
4. The business and industrial parade in which the international community participated
5. The floral parade, which is the highlight parade of the carnival. The parade featured the competing carnival beauties as well as the newly crowned Carnival Queen, her consort, and her court.

== Carnival Queens ==
The highlight of the Manila Carnival is the crowning of the Carnival Queen by the Carnival mascot Billiken. Cameron Forbes and the carnival promoters established the Carnival Queen contest. The Queen will be selected through purchase of ballots through newspaper clippings. Initially, Forbes decided to restrict the contest to the daughters of the wealthiest families from the capital city of Manila but eventually accepted entries from different parts of the country. The Queen was voted through a system of money ballots or magazine coupons. Philippine magazines like Liwayway, Telembang, and Lipang Kalabaw had such coupons inserted in their pages.

The Carnival Queens dressed the most beautiful costumes of the parade, ranging from Egyptian inspired to Siamese to that of the Arabian Scheherazade.

The first Manila Carnival in 1908 elected two queens representing the Oriental beauty and the Western beauty (called Occident) – Pura Villanueva from Iloilo City, Iloilo (Queen of the Orient) and Marjorie Radcliffe Colton from Galesburg, Illinois (Queen of the Occident). The only other time this happened was in 1920 Manila Carnival. In 1912, for the first time aside from the carnival queen the contest chose four ladies to represent Luzon, Visayas, Mindanao, and America. In 1913, three women representing Luzon, Visayas, and Mindanao were named as co-winners of the Manila Carnival. The first and only American woman to solely win as Carnival Queen was Mela Kamakee Fairchild (born in Oakland, California in 1898) in the 1917 Manila Carnival. Two queens were also chosen in 1926 to elect the last to be called as the Carnival Queen (Socorro Henson) and the very first Miss Philippines (Anita Agoncillo Noble)

Manila Carnival Queen is the precursor of various national pageants in the Philippines.

=== Titleholders ===
Manila Carnival Queen titleholders
Year	Title	Image	Winner	Hometown (City / Province or State)	Age	Consort	Notes
1908	Carnival Queen		Pura Villanueva (Queen of the Orient)	Iloilo City, Iloilo	21	Manuel Gomez (King of the Orient), Mauro Prieto, Tomas del Rosario (alternative consorts)	Officially First Manila Carnival Queens. Initially, Ms. Leonarda Limjap, aged 17 was named Manila Carnival Queen by the Philippine Assembly but later resigned the title before she was crowned in late January 1908 in favor of her family vacation in Japan. Villanueva was selected as Limjap's replacement who initially refused to take the title but became the official first Manila carnival queen upon coronation.
1908	Carnival Queen		Marjorie Radcliffe Colton (Queen of the Occident)	Galesburg, Illinois	23	Col. George T. Langhorne (King of the Occident)	Officially First Manila Carnival Queens. Initially, Ms. Leonarda Limjap, aged 17 was named Manila Carnival Queen by the Philippine Assembly but later resigned the title before she was crowned in late January 1908 in favor of her family vacation in Japan. Villanueva was selected as Limjap's replacement who initially refused to take the title but became the official first Manila carnival queen upon coronation.
1909	Carnival Queen		Julia Guerrero Agcaoili	Ilocos Norte	20	Francisco Agcaoili	
1912	Carnival Queen		Paz Jurado Marquez	Tayabas (now Quezon)	18	?	They were the first set of queens to wear national and regional dresses, as opposed to the European-influenced wardrobes of the past Queens.
1912	Reina de Luzon		Pacita Bantug de Guzman	San Isidro, Nueva Ecija	21	?	They were the first set of queens to wear national and regional dresses, as opposed to the European-influenced wardrobes of the past Queens.
1912	Reina de Visayas		Amparo Benitez Noel	Carcar, Cebu	?	Juan Orbeta	They were the first set of queens to wear national and regional dresses, as opposed to the European-influenced wardrobes of the past Queens.
1912	Reina de Mindanao		Remedios Fernandez Reyes	Mambajao, Camiguin	19	Sr. Baldomero Pelaez	They were the first set of queens to wear national and regional dresses, as opposed to the European-influenced wardrobes of the past Queens.
1912	Reina del Dia Americana		Mattie May Law	US	?	?	They were the first set of queens to wear national and regional dresses, as opposed to the European-influenced wardrobes of the past Queens.
1913	Reina de Luzon		Julia Otero Arceo	Batangas	18		
1913	Reina de Visayas		Ana Sandoval Palanca	Iloilo / Cuyo, Palawan	15		
1913	Reina de Mindanao		Inocencia Cabato	Zamboanga	?		
1914	Carnival Queen		Dolores dela Cerna Perez Rubio	Ermita, Manila			
1915	Carnival Queen		Concepcion Medina	Masbate	15	Joseph Manning	
1916	Carnival Queen		Manolita Barretto	Bulacan / Zambales	16	Jose Chuidian	
1917	Carnival Queen		Mela Fairchild	Oakland, California	19	Maj. William Vaughn	The first and only American woman to solely win the title.
1918	Carnival Queen		Enriqueta de Vega Aldanese	Cebu	18	Jose Reyes Galvez	
1920	Carnival Queen		Trinidad Roura de Leon (Queen of the Orient)	San Miguel, Bulacan	19	–	De Leon became the wife and First Lady to future President Manuel Roxas
1920	Carnival Queen		Virginia Randolph Harrison (Queen of the Occident)	New York City, New York	18	Ralph Earnshaw (King of the Orient)	
1921	Carnival Queen		Carmen Prieto	Manila	16	Dr. Basilio J. Valdes	
1922	Carnival Queen		Virginia Llamas	Pagsanjan, Laguna	16	Carlos P. Romulo	The first carnival queen to marry her king consort.
1923	Carnival Queen		Catalina Castillo Apacible	Balayan, Batangas	19	Eugenio Lopez	
1924	Carnival Queen		Trinidad Rodriguez Fernandez	Cuyo, Palawan	24	Jose Araneta	
1925	Carnival Queen		Carmen Papa	San Pedro St., (now "Evangelista") Manila	19	Vicente Mendoza	
1926	Carnival Queen Miss Philippines Miss Pearl of the Orient Seas Miss Luzon Miss Visayas Miss Mindanao		Socorro Henson Anita Noble Carmen Fargas Rosario Genato Aurora Reyes Bala Amai Miring	Angeles, Pampanga Lemery, Batangas Aplaya, Ayala, Zamboanga, Zamboanga del Sur Manila Samar Lanao	18 20 18 – – –	Vicente Rufino Leopoldo Kahn, Antonio de las Alas (alternate consort) No Consort No Consort No Consort No Consort	First national beauty contest. The last winner to be named carnival queen was Socorro Henson while the very first to be named Miss Philippines was Anita Agoncillo Noble.
1927	Miss Philippines Miss Luzon Miss Visayas Miss Mindanao		Luisa Fernandez Marasigan Iluminada Laurel Lourdes Rodriguez Nora Maulana	Gumaca, Tayabas (now Quezon) Laguna Cebu Sulu	16 ? ? ?	Guillermo Jose No Consort No Consort No Consort	
1929	Miss Philippines		Pacita Ongsiako de los Reyes	Tondo, Manila	17		
1930	Miss Philippines Miss Luzon Miss Visayas Miss Mindanao		Consuelo "Monina" Acuña Estrella Alvarez Luz Villaluna Rosario Ruiz Zorilla	Iloilo Laoag, Ilocos Norte Cebu? –	17 – – –	Emilio Osmeña – – Rosendo M. Chanco	
1931	Miss Philippines Miss Luzon Miss Visayas Miss Mindanao		Maria Villanueva Kalaw Lina Araullo Luisa Rodriguez Louise Stevens	Batangas / Iloilo – – –	20 – – –	Teddy Kalaw – – –	First second-generation queen (mother – daughter carnival queens) in Carnival history.Kalaw became a senator and head of the Board of Censors for Motion Pictures
1932	Miss Philippines Miss Luzon Miss Visayas Miss Mindanao		Emma Gonzales Zamora Rosalina C. Lim Aleli A. Guzman Violeta Lopez	Quiapo, Manila Pangasinan Paco, Manila Iloilo	19 – – –	Dr. Arturo de Santos Geronimo Santiago Jr. – –	
1933	Miss Philippines Miss Luzon Miss Visayas Miss Mindanao		Engracia Arcinas Laconico Charity O. Crow Blanquita Opinion Angelina Biunas	Sta. Cruz, Manila Hollister, California / Iloilo – Manila	21 17 – 17	Dr. Gregorio Y. Zara – – –	First Miss Philippines and another carnival queen to marry her king consort.
1934	Miss Philippines Miss Luzon Miss Visayas Miss Mindanao		Clarita Tankiang Luisa Laconico Marcelina Cuenca Consuelo Villamor	Marilao, Bulacan – Manila Bangued, Abra	15 – – 22	Arturo Tolentino Hector Gomez Antonio Albert –	
1935	Miss Philippines Miss Luzon Miss Visayas Miss Mindanao		Conchita Chuidian Sunico Catalina Zabala Julieta Lugod Abad Celia Araullo	Binondo, Manila – – –	18 – – –	Antonio Bayot Pedro Chanco Jr. Jose Feliciano Jose Zamora	Carmen del Rosario was the original Miss Mindanao. She reigned for a few days before relinquishing her title in favor of her studies. Celia Araullo was chosen in her place as Miss Mindanao.
1936	Miss Philippines Miss Luzon Miss Visayas Miss Mindanao		Mercedes Montilla Amparo Reyes Karagdag Helen Cutaran Bennett Cleofe Jaime Balingit	Kabankalan, Negros Occidental Malolos, Bulacan Nueva Vizcaya Macabebe, Pampanga	20 20 24 –	Zafiro Ledesma Ricardo Manotok Francisco Chanco Ricardo Paras	
1937	Miss Philippines Miss Luzon Miss Visayas Miss Mindanao		Carmen Zaldarriaga Elisa Manalo Sonia Ortaliz Gamboa Adelaida Coscolluela	Manila Pampanga Silay, Negros Occidental Negros Occidental	17 – – –	Col. Antonio Arnaiz – – –	Manila Carnival is now called as Philippine Exposition. Another Miss Philippines marrying her king consort later.
1938	Miss Philippines Miss Luzon Miss Visayas Miss Mindanao		Guia Gonzales Balmori Rosario Ferro Belen de Guzman Marina Lopez	Pampanga / Pangasinan – – –	17 – – –	Ernesto Santos – – –	
1939	Miss Philippines Miss Luzon Miss Visayas Miss Mindanao		Iluminada Tuason Estrella Santos Fabon Adela Planas Herminia Cajulis	Indang, Cavite – – Binakayan, Cavite	– – – 20	– – – –	The last Manila Carnival or Philippine Exposition to take place few years before World War II. The last carnival queen to be crowned.

=== National Beauty Contest ===
These are the candidates for the national beauty contests of the Manila Carnival.

==== 1st National Beauty Contest ====
Year	Name	Candidate	Notes
1926	Miss Agusan Miss Albay Miss Baguio Miss Bataan Miss Batangas Miss Bohol Miss Bukidnon Miss Bulacan Miss Camarines Sur Miss Capiz Miss Cebu Miss Davao Miss Ilocos Norte Miss Ilocos Sur Miss Iloilo Miss Isabela Miss Laguna Miss Lanao Miss La Union Miss Leyte Miss Manila Miss Marinduque Miss Masbate Miss Misamis Miss Negros Occidental Miss Nueva Ecija Miss Nueva Vizcaya Miss Palawan Miss Pampanga Miss Pangasinan Miss Rizal Miss Romblon Miss Sulu Miss Surigao Miss Tarlac Miss Tayabas Miss Zamboanga	Leonila Reyes – Cristina Victoria Rosa Reyes Anita Noble Ascension Gaviola Isabel Melendez Leonor Reyes Andrea Baduria Rosario Picazo – Lucille Maxey – Rosario Cadiz Aida Kilayko Ernestina Pardel Nieto Loreto Relova Bala Amai Miring Manuela Ortega Aurora Reyes Rosario Genato Rosario Cayetano Elia Sanchez Amparo Nery Margarita Lacson – Martha Maddela Carmen Fernandez Rosario Panganiban Corazon Sison Remedios Santos – Scott Rasul Sol Soriano Isolina Palma Nita San Agustin Carmen Fargas	Miss Bulacan, Leonor Reyes is from Malolos who is a teacher all her life. She died a single on 27 February 2006 at the age of 96. Miss Pampanga, Rosario Panganiban became the wife of film director Vicente Salumbides and starred in some of his movies like "Miracle of Love". Miss Tarlac, Isolina Palma is the daughter of Genoveva Puno and Gregorio Palma, former Bacolor mayor. She married Dr. Valeriano Calma PhD in agriculture and agronomy and they settled in Los Baños, Laguna.

==== 2nd National Beauty Contest ====
Year	Name	Candidate	Notes
1927	Miss Abra Miss Albay Miss Baguio Miss Bataan Miss Bukidnon Miss Bulacan Miss Cagayan Miss Cavite Miss Capiz Miss Cebu Miss Ilocos Norte Miss Ilocos Sur Miss Iloilo Miss Isabela Miss La Union Miss Laguna Miss Lanao Miss Leyte Miss Manila Miss Marinduque Miss Mindoro Miss Misamis Miss Mountain Province Miss Negros Oriental Miss Nueva Ecija Miss Nueva Vizcaya Miss Palawan Miss Pampanga Miss Pangasinan Miss Rizal Miss Romblon Miss Samar Miss Sulu Miss Surigao Miss Tarlac Miss Zamboanga	Consolacion Purugganan Rosario Imperial Beatrice Sanup Rosalina Fonacier Isabel Melendez Pacita Mateo Carmen Quinto Leonor Bustamante Rosario Picazo Lourdes Rodriguez Petra Molina Susana Tugade Julieta Lopez Arminda Martinez Carmen Campos Iluminada Laurel Manuki Makarimbang Amelia Romualdez Luisa Marasigan Mercedes de Jesus Caridad Morente Consuelo Roa Juliet Linney Rizalina Calumpang Julita Matias Josefina Tolentino Elvira Manalo Rosario Manuel Asuncion Gonzales Encarnacion Johnson Ibañez Isabel Bowers Rosie McGuire Nora Maulana Sol Soriano Luz Besa Manolita Villaescusa	Miss Bulacan Pacita Mateo is from Baliuag daughter of the legendary beauty Josefa Lara Tiongson aka Pepitang Himala, the subject of a popular kundiman, "Jocelynang Baliuag". Miss Leyte, Amelia Romualdez is the first cousin of former first lady and congresswoman Imelda Romualdez Marcos and married to Col. Maximiano Jenairo and settled in Maryland, US. Miss Mindoro from Pinamalayan Caridad Morente was born 7 January 1906. She finished pre-med zoology from the University of the Philippines. Married Atty. Jesus Pineda and settled in Concepcion, Tarlac. At 100 years old, she was the oldest alumni of St. Scholastica High School. Miss Pampanga, Rosario Manuel is from Bacolor and daughter of Generosos Manuel and Gliceria Laxamana. Lived all her life in Pampanga and died single. Miss Pangasinan, Asuncion Gonzales is a direct relative of Nieves Gonzales, 1919 Pangasinan Carnival Queen and grandmother of 1973 Miss Universe Margie Moran. Miss Rizal, Encarnacion Johnson Ibañez married the king consort of Miss Philippines 1927, Guillermo Jose. Their sons became national tennis and pelota champions. Miss Tarlac, Luz Besa was born on 7 November 1907 to Tomas Besa Sr. and Fabiana Salak. She married her escort Engr. Arturo Ilagan. She died in 2002.

== In pop culture ==
Manila Carnival Queens: Celebration of Filipino Womanhood, event poster

On 30 May 2026, "Manila Carnival Queens: Celebration of Filipino Womanhood," a free theatrical revue staged at the Metropolitan Theater in Manila as the closing event of National Heritage Month. Written by Nicolas Pichay, directed by Rem Zamora, and featuring original music by Vincent A. de Jesus, the production was presented through a collaboration between the National Commission for Culture and the Arts (NCCA) and Panasonic: Projector and Display. The revue revisited the history and legacy of Manila’s Carnival Queens—considered precursors to modern national beauty pageants in the Philippines—through music and performance, with a fashion show of Filipiñana creations, highlighting their contributions to Filipino society and cultural memory.

== See also ==
- History of the Philippines (1898–1946)
- Binibining Pilipinas
- Miss Philippines Earth
- Miss Republic of the Philippines
- Miss World Philippines
- Miss Universe Philippines
- The Miss Philippines

== Further reading and viewing ==
=== Books and magazines ===
- Lipang Kalabaw Vol.3, No. 56 1923 (carries interesting articles about the Manila Carnivals)
- Telembang Magazine 1922–24
- Joaquin, Nick "Manila, My Manila", 1979, Manila Philippines
- McCoy Alfred and Roces Alfredo, "Philippine Cartoons" 1983, Manila, Philippines
