= Maria Kalaw Katigbak =

Filipino politician and former beauty queen

The Honorable Maria V. Kalaw-Katigbak
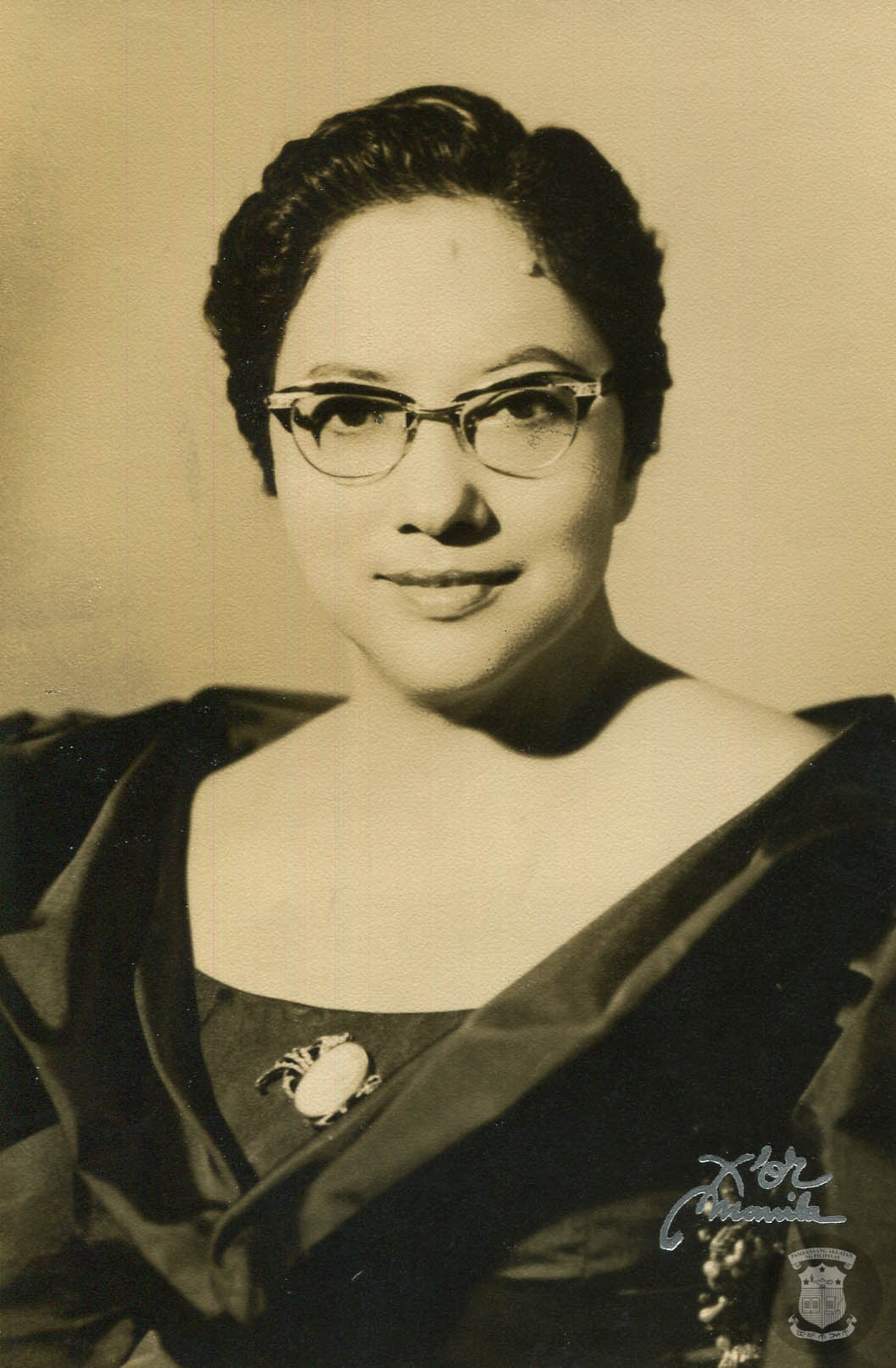

Senator of the Philippines
- In office December 30, 1961 – December 30, 1967

Chairperson of the Board of Censors for Motion Pictures
- In office 1981–1985
- Preceded by: Ma. Rocio Atienza de Vega
- Succeeded by: Manuel Morato

Personal details
- Born: Maria Villanueva Kalaw; February 14, 1912 Manila, Philippine Islands
- Died: December 10, 1992 (aged 80) Philippines
- Resting place: Manila Memorial Park – Sucat, Paranaque, Philippines
- Party: Liberal
- Spouse: Dr. Jose R. Katigbak (m. 1940)
- Children: 4
- Parents: Teodoro M. Kalaw, Sr. (father); Pura G. Villanueva-Kalaw (mother)
- Education: University of the Philippines; University of Michigan; University of Santo Tomas
- Occupation: Journalist

Maria V. Kalaw-Katigbak (born Maria Villanueva Kalaw; February 14, 1912 – December 10, 1992) was a Filipina politician, journalist and beauty queen. She served as a Senator of the Philippines from 1961 to 1967 during the Fifth Congress.

== Early life and education ==
Kalaw Katigbak was born Maria Villanueva Kalaw on February 14, 1912 to Filipino journalist, politician and former revolutionary Teodoro M. Kalaw, Sr. of Batangas and Filipino-Spanish Purificación "Pura" G. Villanueva-Kalaw of Arevalo district in the city of Iloilo, who also the first Manila Carnival Queen as the Queen of the Orient. Her father was a prominent politician who worked under Manuel L. Quezon's administration as executive secretary and later secretary of the Interior. Her mother was a civic rights leader and was crowned as the first Manila Carnival Queen in 1908.

Maria was the eldest of the Kalaw's four surviving children. She studied at the Jefferson Elementary School and St. Scholastica's College Manila for about a year while taking religion courses. In 1928, she graduated high school valedictorian at Philippine Women's University (PWU).

In 1932, she finished her degree of philosophy and masters of social work at the University of the Philippines. While in college, she joined the writing staff of the prominent student-newspaper Philippine Collegian, became a secretary of the UP Student Council, president of UP Women's Club, secretary of the UP Debating Club and a member of the UP Writers Club. Upon graduation, she received the Most Distinguished Senior Student Award. She was also a charter member of the Sigma Delta Phi sorority.

She was awarded the Barbour Scholarship and finished a master's degree in literature at the University of Michigan in 1933. During her stay, she became active in organizations such as Philippine-Michigan Club and the Cosmopolitan Club for Foreign Students. She later attended the University of Santo Tomas where she received her doctor of philosophy's degree in social sciences, magna cum laude.

In 1931, she was crowned as the Queen of the Orient of the Manila Carnival (equivalent to today's Miss Philippines Earth or Binibining Pilipinas), 23 years after her mother's coronation. She gathered a lead of about one million votes, which came primarily from different sponsors.

== Professional career ==
Kalaw wrote a column in The Manila Times entitled "Checkpoint". Her essays appeared in the Literary Apprentice: “Far Away” (1954) and were included in Filipino Essays in English: 1910-1954; "An Appeal to Husbands" and "May We Have Our Say?" appeared in the Philippine Review issues of August 1943 and February 1944.

== Political career ==
In 1961, Kalaw Katigbak ran for Senate under the Liberal Party ticket. She landed on the 7th spot garnering 2,546,147 votes. She then became the third female senator of the Philippines, after Geronima Pecson in 1947 and Pacita Madrigal-Warns in 1955, and the lone woman in the Fifth Congress. As a senator, Kalaw Katigbak championed the Senate Bill No. 652 restoring the old school calendar to June and excluding the hot summer months which promote sleepiness and thus, may not be conducive for learning, which was changed earlier by Education Secretary Alejandro Roces. She was also the author of the Senate Bill No. 84, now known as Republic Act No. 3765 or the "Truth in Lending Act of 1963", which extends protection to consumer buying goods on an installment plan and enabling credit transactions. She also authored the Senate Bill No. 30 which aimed to amend Republic Act No. 621, or "An Act Creating the United Nations Educational, Scientific, and Cultural Organization National Commission of the Philippines". In 1964, she wrote the Republic Act No. 4165, or the law that mandated the creation and appropriation of the National Commission on Culture.

During her term, she handled the Senate committees on education, commerce, and industry. In 1965, she was joined in the Senate by her sister-in-law, Eva Estrada-Kalaw.

From 1962 to 1966, she served as the chairperson of UNESCO General Conference of the Philippines. She unsuccessfully bid for re-election in 1967, ended up being 11th.

== Post-political career ==
In 1974, Maria V. Kalaw-Katigbak published her first book, Few There Were (Like My Father) about her father. In 1983, she wrote a book about her mother entitled Legacy: Pura Villanueva Kalaw, Her Times, Life, and Works, 1886-1954.

In 1984, she translated from Spanish to English her father Teodoro's work Aide-de-Camp to Freedom, in which she inserted a chapter about former president Manuel Quezon.

From 1981 to 1986, she headed the Board of Review for Motion Pictures and Television (BRMPT), which would later be MTRCB. The precursor agencies of BRMPT and MTRCB, Philippine Board of Censorship for Motion Pictures was headed first by her father after its creation in 1929.

== Other activities ==
Kalaw Katigbak was the president of the Girl Scouts of the Philippines for many years. She also headed the Municipal Symphony Orchestra, Quezon City Girl Scouts Council, and the Philippine Women's Writers Association.

From 1962 to 1964, she became a member of the UP Board of Regents. She also held several positions at the Catholic Women's League, Catholic Charities of Manila, as the governor of the Philippine Red Cross, the Board of National Education, Board of State Colleges, Philippine Normal College, Philippine College of Commerce, Philippine College of Arts and Trade, Samar Institute of Technology, Mindanao Institute of Technology, Philippine Board of Scholarships for Southeast Asia and the Commission on Appointments.

As an educator, she taught both in UP and PWU, and headed the UST Graduate School of Social Work. She became a member of the Philippine delegation for Afro-Asian Conference of Girl Scouts in Athens, Second World Congress of Lay Apostolate (Rome) in 1957, and the 21st UNESCO General Conference (Paris) in 1982.

== Personal life ==
Kalaw Katigbak was married to Jose Roxas Katigbak, an obstetrician-gynecologist, whom they had four children: Marinela, Josefina, Purisima and Norberto. Her second sibling, Teodoro "Teddy" V. Kalaw, Jr. was a lawyer. Teddy's wife, Eva G. Estrada-Kalaw, was a senator from 1965 to 1972 and was unsuccessful for the vice presidential bid in 1992.

She had three farms in Lipa, Batangas, the birthplace of her father, where she cultivated black pepper, corn, ipil-ipil, and coffee. She was known to regard kapeng barako to her friends.

Maria Kalaw Katigbak died on December 10, 1992, aged 80.

== Legacy ==
- Senator Maria Kalaw Katigbak Memorial School, formerly Marawoy (CADRE) Elementary School in Lipa, Batangas.

Government offices
Preceded by Ma. Rocio Atienza de Vega	Chairperson of MTRCB; 1981–1985	Succeeded by Manoling Morato
