= Teodoro Celli =

Italian journalist and music critic (1917 - 1989)

- Teodoro Celli in a 1980s documentary
- Born: 1917; Parma, Italy
- Died: 1989 (aged 71–72); Rome, Italy
- Occupations: Journalist; writer; music critic

Teodoro Celli (1917–1989) was an Italian journalist, writer and music critic.

== Biography ==
He was born in Parma in 1917. After studying piano and composition in Milan, the city where he grew up and where he graduated in literature, in 1941 he began to collaborate with newspapers and weeklies (including Oggi).

In the 1950s he became a music critic, specializing in Richard Wagner's music and writing a biography of Giuseppe Verdi entitled Va Va' pensiero.

From the seventies until his death he lived in Rome, where he worked as a music critic of Il Messaggero.

Alongside his activity as a critic to that of a writer, he published other books, including L'arte di Victor De Sabata (dedicated to Victor De Sabata, published in 1978) and the collection of essays Il dio Wagner e altri dei della musica (started in 1980).

As a regular collaborator of the Edizioni del Teatro alla Scala, he published an essay on the occasion of the 400th anniversary of the inauguration of the theater rebuilt after the bombings of the summer of 1943 that Celli lived closely: his family was displaced in Castano Primo while his father, who worked at the Commercial Bank, survived the bombings in Milan and continued to work.

The events of the night of August 1943, when the Lombard capital was at the center of a furious bombardment by four hundred allied "flying fortresses", was told by Celli himself in an interview/documentary with Enzo Biagi released in 1983, a few years before his death, which occurred in Rome in 1989.

Celli was therefore an eyewitness, as well as the destruction, also of the reconstruction of the famous Milanese theater, which began in 1944 and ended in the spring of 1946, and was among those who attended the inauguration concert of the reconstructed Scala directed by Arturo Toscanini, who came specifically from the US for the occasion.

He died in Rome in 1989.
