= Suzy King =

Georgina Pires Sampaio
- Born: August 28, 1917; Brazil
- Died: August , 1985; California, United States
- Occupations: Dancer; singer; actress; fakir

Georgina Pires Sampaio (born August 28, 1917 – August, 1985) was a Brazilian dancer, singer, actress and fakir. She is best known for her dance routines which involved snakes.

== Biography ==
Sampaio started her career in 1939, in São Paulo, Brazil, as Diva Rios, singing sambas and marches.

Later on she changed her name to Suzy King and started her iconic act of performing with pythons.

Sampaio was renowned during the 1950s when fakirism was most popular.

Sampaio wrote a play that was banned by the authorities. She also tried to emulate Lady Godiva wearing a long blond wig to cover her breasts and riding a horse through the center of the city. She was almost gang-raped by a mob and was saved by a passerby.

She left for Mexico in the late 1960s, where she changed her name to Yacui Yapura Sampaio Bailey. She married an American in 1970 and moved to the United States.

Sampaio died alone in her trailer in California in 1985.

Sampaio is featured in the book, Cravo na Carne: Fama e Fome, by Alberto de Oliveira and Alberto Camarero.
