= Teodoro Kalaw III =

Filipino sports shooter

Teodoro E. Kalaw III
Personal information
- Born: Teodoro Estrada Kalaw III; 4 August 1947 (age 79)

Sport
- Country: Philippines
- Sport: Sports shooting

Teodoro Estrada Kalaw III (born 4 August 1947) is a Filipino former sports shooter. He competed in the 50 metre pistol event at the 1972 Summer Olympics.

Teodoro Kalaw III is the son of Bataan Death March veteran Teodoro V. Kalaw Jr. and former senator Eva Estrada Kalaw. He is married Maria Trinidad Yujuico, the first female chair of the Philippine Stock Exchange. His son, Teodoro Alejandro Y. Kalaw IV, a lawyer, lectures at the Ateneo de Manila Law School.
