= Estefane Sampaio =

Brazilian politician (born 2000)

Member of the Legislative Chamber of the Federal District
- Incumbent
- Assumed office 1 February 2027

Personal details
- Born: 19 October 2000 (age 26)
- Party: Republicans

Estefane Moura Santos Sampaio (born 19 October 2000) is a Brazilian politician who was elected member of the Legislative Chamber of the Federal District in 2026. She has served as coordinator of the Garotas Republicanas branch of the Republicans since 2026.
