= Teodoro Kalaw =

Filipino writer (1884–1940)

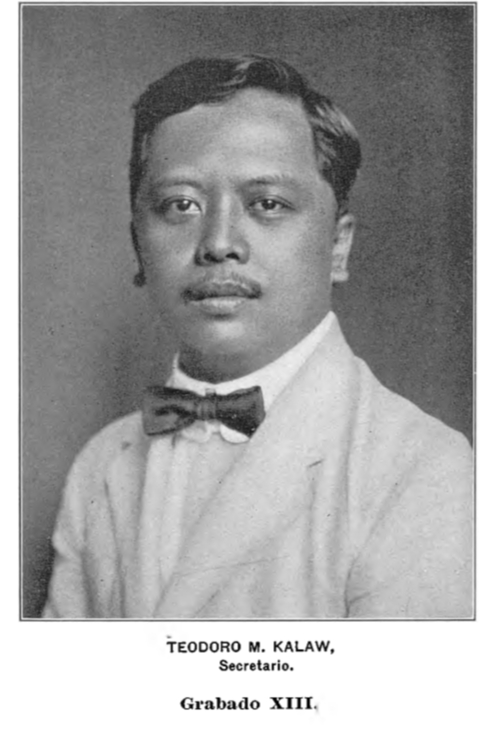
- Kalaw as secretary to the Philippine Assembly, c. 1913

Secretary of the Interior
- In office July 7, 1920 – December 31, 1922
- Preceded by: Rafael Palma
- Succeeded by: Jose P. Laurel

Member of the Philippine Assembly from Batangas's 3rd district
- In office 1909–1912
- Preceded by: Gregorio Catigbac
- Succeeded by: Fidel A. Reyes

Director of the National Library of the Philippines
- In office February 16, 1929 – December 14, 1939
- Preceded by: Epifanio de los Santos (as Director of the Philippine Library and Museum)
- Succeeded by: Eulogio B. Rodriguez
- In office 1916–1920

Personal details
- Born: March 31, 1884 Lipa, Batangas, Captaincy General of the Philippines
- Died: December 4, 1940 (aged 56) Manila, Commonwealth of the Philippines
- Party: Nacionalista
- Spouse: Purificacion "Pura" Garcia Villanueva (m. 1910)
- Children: 4 (including Maria V. Kalaw-Katigbak and Purita V. Kalaw-Ladesma)
- Relatives: Maximo Kalaw (brother); Eva Estrada Kalaw (daughter-in-law)

Teodoro Manguiat Kalaw Sr. (March 31, 1884 – December 4, 1940) was a Filipino scholar, legislator, and historian in Spanish language.

== Early life ==
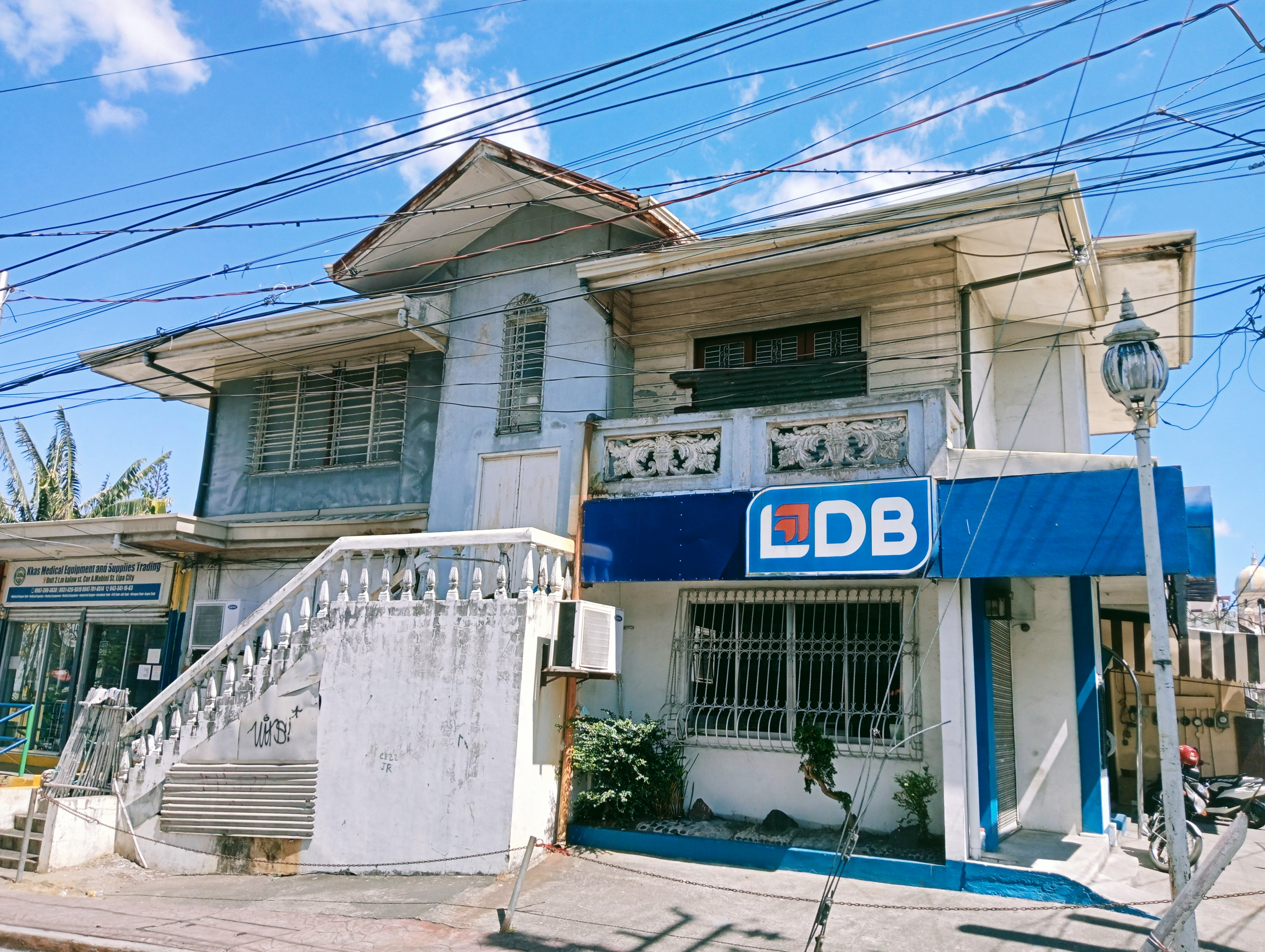
T. M. Kalaw Birthplace House in Lipa, Batangas

Kalaw was born in Lipa, Batangas, on March 31, 1884. He was the third of four children of police chief Valerio Kalaw and Maria Manguiat. His siblings were scholar and political scientist Maximo, and two sisters, Rosario and Manuela.

Kalaw finished his secondary studies at Instituto Rizal in Lipa, Batangas, and finished his bachelor's degree in arts with honors at Liceo de Manila. He took up his law degree at Escuela de Derecho, where he was mentored by Rafael Palma and Juan Sumulong. In 1905, he topped the bar examinations, having obtained "grade of 100 percent in civil law and three other subjects".

Kalaw served as secretary of then Philippine Assembly Majority Floor Leader Manuel L. Quezon until 1908.

== Journalism ==
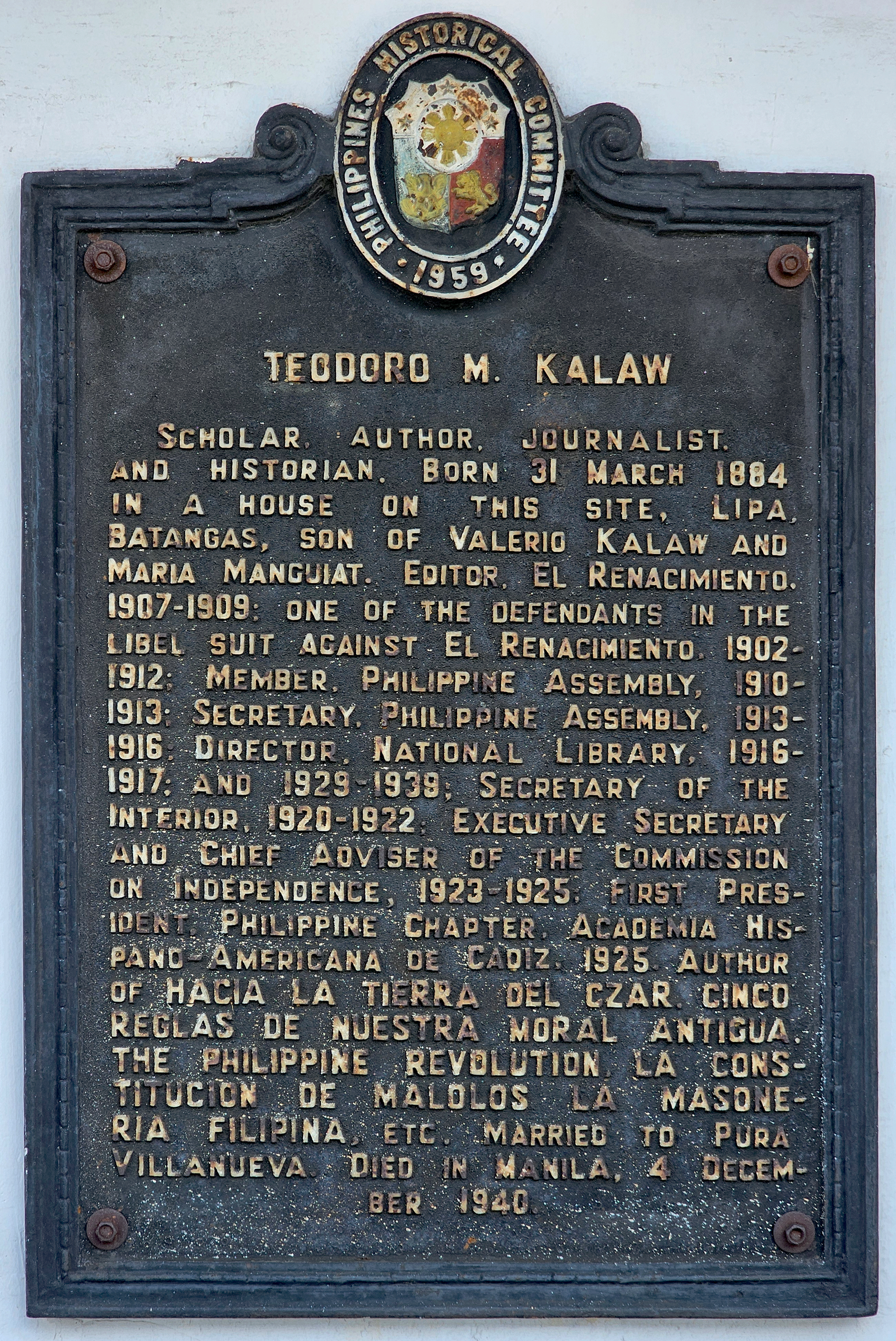
Historical marker installed in 1959 at the site of Kalaw's birth in Lipa, Batangas

While pursuing law, Kalaw became a writer for El Renacimiento, along with Rafael Palma and Fernando Ma. Guerrero. In October 1908, Interior Secretary Dean C. Worcester filed a libel suit against the paper for their editorial entitled "Aves de Rapiña" ("Birds of Prey").

The case led to the closure of the paper. In January 1910, the court meted out prison sentences against Kalaw and publisher Martin Ocampo. Both Kalaw and Ocampo were pardoned by Governor General Francis B. Harrison in 1914.

== Political career ==
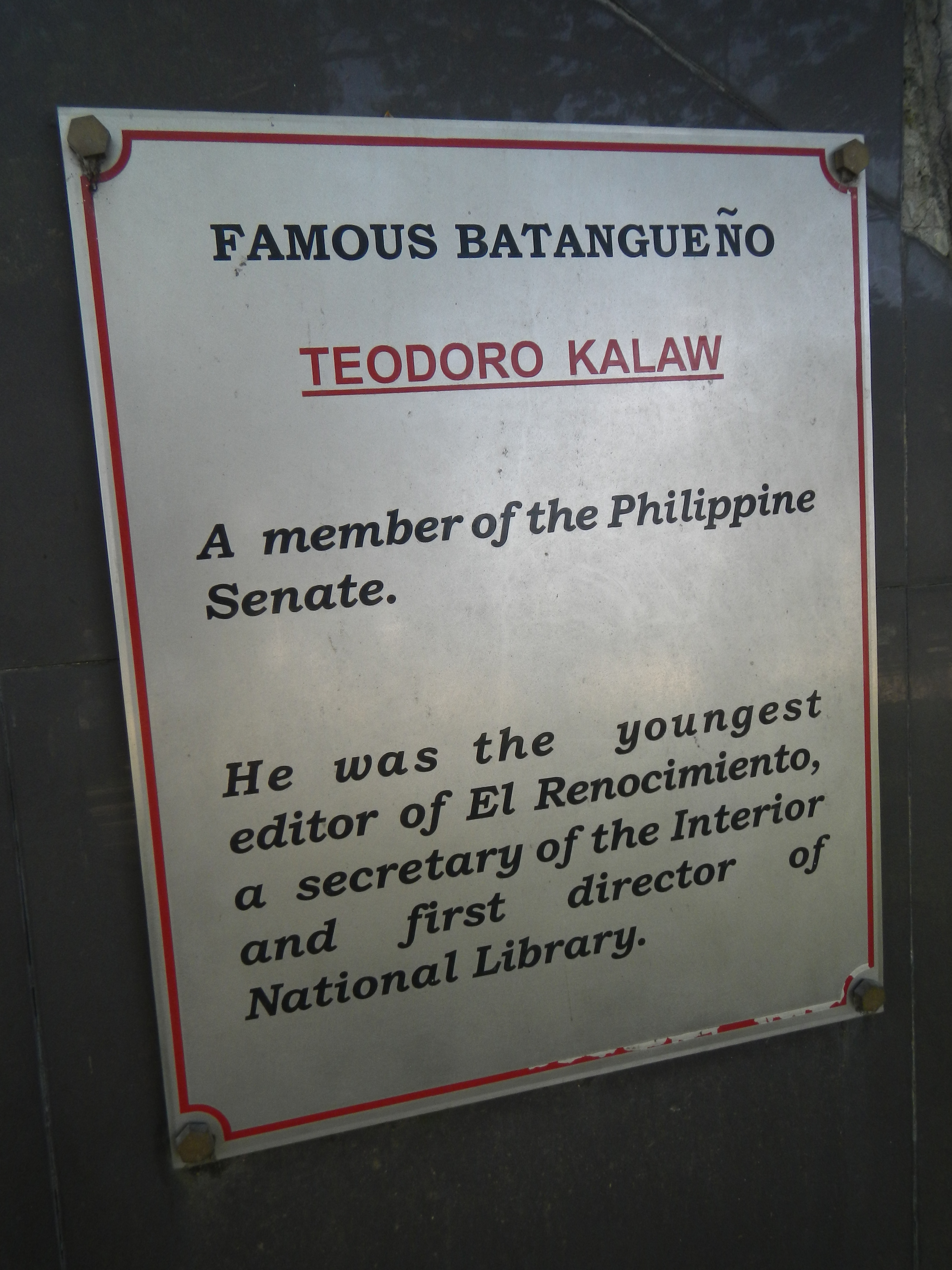
Teodoro Kalaw (Batangas Provincial Capitol)

In 1909, Kalaw was elected the youngest member of the Philippine Assembly at age 25, representing Batangas's 3rd district. During his term, he sponsored bills supporting internal migration and agricultural development and maintenance of public schools through municipal taxation.

At the end of his term in 1913, he was appointed secretary to the Philippine Assembly. In 1916, he was appointed the first director of the National Library and served until 1920, earning the moniker "Father of the Philippine Library System". He would serve as its director once more from 1929 to 1939.

In 1920, he was appointed Interior Secretary. His term as secretary was cut short on December 21, 1922, when Senate President Manuel L. Quezon appointed him as executive secretary and chief adviser of the Commission on Independence.

== Memberships ==
Kalaw became a Mason in 1907, then later became a grand master at age 31 in 1928. On June 15, 1932, he was made a 33° Mason in the Scottish Rite of Masonry. He became Grand Master of the Grand Lodge of the Philippines from 1928 to 1929.

Kalaw was a member of the Academy of Political Science, American Social and Political Science; Sociedad Americana de Derecho Internacional; Real Academia Hispano Americano de Ciencias y Artes, of whose Philippine Section he became president in 1925; Associacion Hispano-Filipina, and the Philippine Library Association.

He was conferred an honorary fellowship with the Upsilon Sigma Phi fraternity.

== Death ==
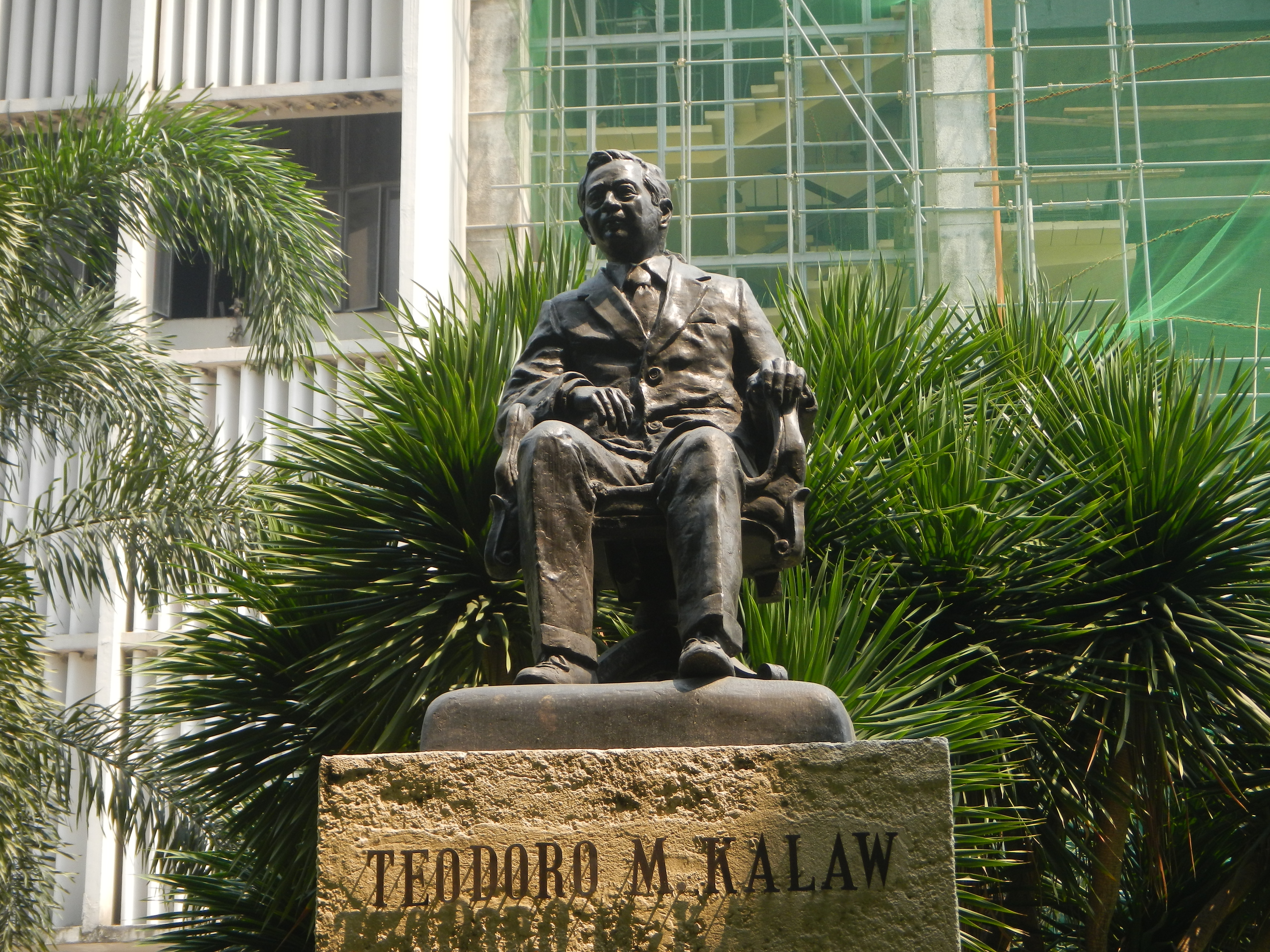
Statue to Kalaw at the National Library of the Philippines

Kalaw died on December 4, 1940, aged 56, at the Philippine General Hospital in Manila.

== Personal life ==
Kalaw and his wife, Pura, had three children. Their son, Teodoro V. Kalaw Jr., became a prominent businessman and was married to Philippine senator Eva R. Estrada-Kalaw. Their daughter, Maria V. Kalaw-Katigbak, was a Philippine Senator from 1961 to 1967. Another daughter, Purita V. Kalaw-Ledesma, was an art critic.

== Works and writings ==
- La Campaña de Kuomintang
- Reformas en La Enseñanza del Derecho
- La Constitucion de Malolos (1910), a critical analysis of the Malolos Constitution
- Teorias Constitucionales (1912), theories and analysis of nationhood, government, and constitution
- The Constitutional Plan of the Philippine Revolution (1914)
- La Revolucion Filipina (1914)
- Manual de Ciencia Politica (1918)
- Ang Pinagtatalunang Akta ng Katipunan (1930)
- Las Cartas Politicas de Apolinario Mabini (1930)
- Epistolario Rizalino (1930-1937)
- Gregorio H. Del Pilar: Heroe de Tirad (1930), biography of Gregorio H. Del Pilar
- Aide-de-Camp to Freedom (1940)
