= Trinidad Legarda =

Filipina suffragist and ambassador

- Born: Trinidad Fernandez Legarda; March 28, 1899; Cuyo, Palawan, Philippine Islands
- Died: February 2, 1998 (aged 98)

Trinidad Fernandez Legarda (March 28, 1899 – February 2, 1998) was a Filipina suffragist, clubwoman, philanthropist, and editor. She was the first woman ambassador from the Philippines, when she was appointed in 1958.

== Early life ==
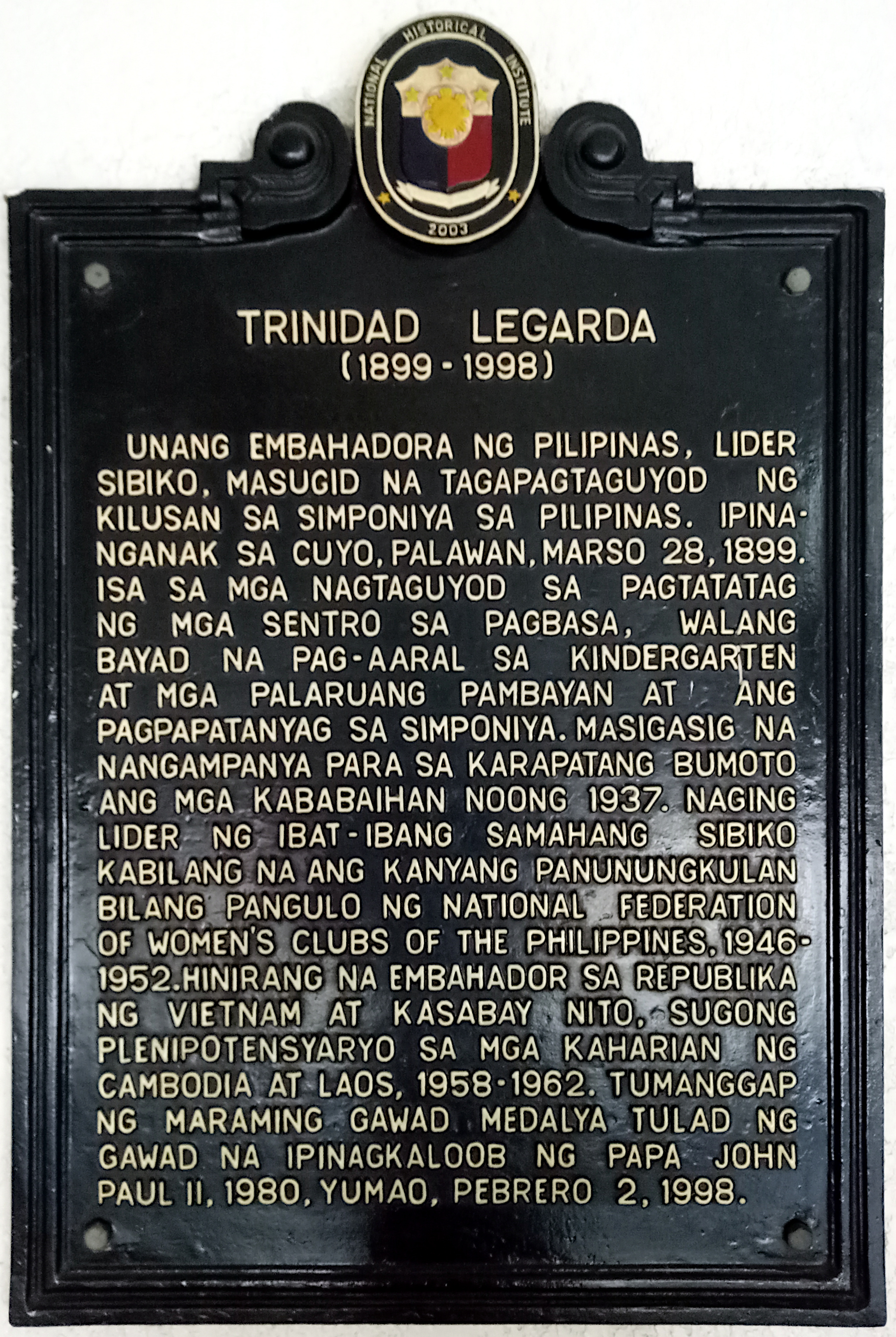
NHI historical marker installed in 2003 inside the National Federation of Women's Clubs of the Philippines building in Ermita, Manila

Trinidad Fernandez y Rodriguez was born in Cuyo, Palawan, the daughter of Clemente Fernandez and Vicenta Rodriguez. While she was still a teenager, Trinidad Fernandez trained to be a teacher, taught school in her hometown, and began working as secretary to an American clubwoman in Manila. She was a beauty queen as a young woman, holding the title Queen of the Manila Carnival in 1924.

== Career ==
Trinidad Fernandez Legarda was English-language editor of The Woman's Outlook, a pro-suffrage publication in the Philippines. She was also president of the National Federation of Women's Clubs, and a leader in the Filipina suffrage movement. Her 1931 essay in Philippine Magazine, "Philippine Women and the Vote", drew from American rhetoric, but also quoted a Hindu proverb, in making the case for suffrage. She was president of the Manila Symphony Society from 1933 to 1958.

During World War II she set up a convalescent home for veterans and war widows. In 1946, she led the reorganization of the National Federation of Women's Clubs, which had lost most of its assets during the war. In 1949, she ran unsuccessfully for a senate seat.

She represented the Philippines at international meetings after World War II. In 1953, Trinidad F. Legarda was named Civic Leader of the Year. She was appointed ambassador to South Vietnam in 1958, and served in that role until 1962. She was the first woman ambassador to represent the Philippines.

== Personal life ==
Trinidad Fernandez married lawyer Benito Legarda IV (grandson of Benito Legarda) in 1925. They had three children, Benito (1926–2020), Filomenita (1928–1931), and Carmen (1932–2006). She was widowed in 1973 and died in 1998 aged 98. Lawyer and advocate Katrina Legarda is her granddaughter.
