= Manuel P. Teodoro =

American political scientist

- Awards: Herbert Simon Award (APSA), Lynton K. Caldwell Prize

Academic background
- Education: University of Michigan (PhD), Cornell University (MPA), Seattle University (BA)
- Thesis: (2001)

Academic work
- Discipline: Political science
- Institutions: University of Wisconsin - Madison, Texas A&M University, Colgate University
- Website: https://mannyteodoro.com/

Manuel P. Teodoro is an American political scientist and Robert F. & Sylvia T. Wagner Professor at the LaFollette School of Public Affairs at the University of Wisconsin-Madison. He is a winner of the Herbert Simon Award (APSA) for the book Bureaucratic Ambition and the Lynton K. Caldwell Prize for the book The Profits of Distrust.

== Books ==
- The Profits of Distrust: Citizen-consumers, drinking water, and the crisis of confidence in American government. with Samantha Zuhlke & David Switzer. New York: Cambridge University Press 2022
- Bureaucratic Ambition: Careers, Motives, and the Innovative Administrator. Baltimore: Johns Hopkins University Press 2011
