= Asociación Feminista Ilonga =

The Asociación Feminista Ilonga was a Philippine suffragist organization, founded in 1906.

The Asociación Feminista Ilonga was founded in 1906 by Pura Villanueva Kalaw. It belonged to the pioneer women's organizations in the Philippines, which had organized with the foundation the foundation of Asociación Feminista Filipina, the years prior. While the Asociación Feminista Filipina had focused on various feminist issues, the Asociación Feminista Ilonga was founded explicitly with the purpose of campaign for the introduction of women's suffrage. It was dominated by indigenous Filipino women, and was followed in 1912 by the foundation of the Society for the Advancement of Women (SAW), in which Filipino and American women on the Philippines united to promote the reform.

The goal was finally achieved in the 1937 Philippine women's suffrage plebiscite.
