= Teodoro Fernandes Sampaio =

Brazilian polymath (1855–1937)

Teodoro Sampaio
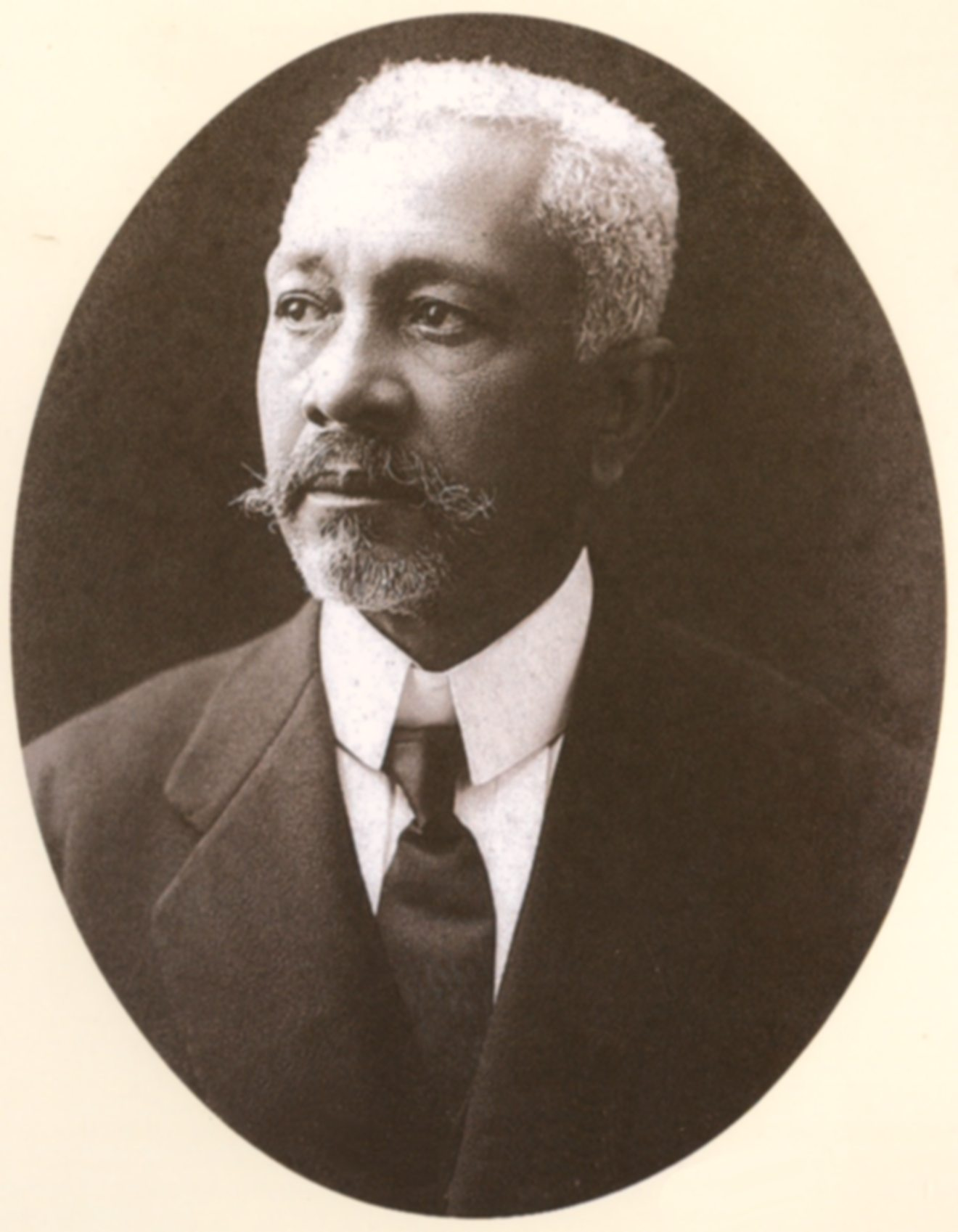

Member of the Chamber of Deputies
- In office 2 May 1927 – 1929
- Constituency: Bahia

Personal details
- Born: 7 January 1855 Santo Amaro, Bahia
- Died: 11 October 1937 (aged 82)
- Education: Polytechnic School
- Occupation: engineer, geographer, politician and historian
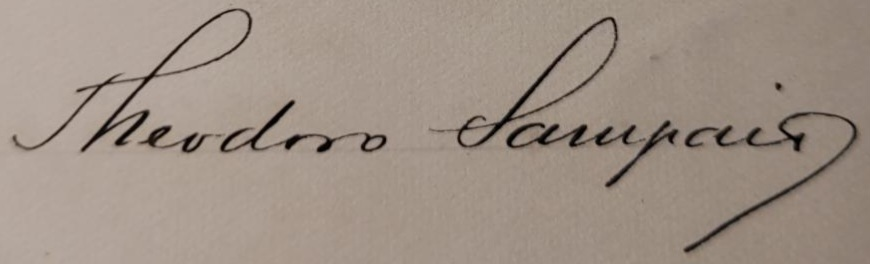
- Signature

Teodoro Fernandes Sampaio (Brazilian Portuguese pronunciation: [teoˈdɔɾu feʁˈnɐ̃dʒis sɐ̃ˈpaju]; 7 January 1855 – 11 October 1937) was a Brazilian polymath and public intellectual who worked as an engineer, geographer, politician, and historian.

== Early life ==
Sampaio was born on the Engenho Canabrava, property of the Viscount of Aramaré in Santo Amaro, Bahia. His father was Manuel Fernandes Sampaio, a white priest, and his mother, Domingas da Paixão do Carmo, was a black enslaved woman.

== Education ==
In 1864, his father took young Sampaio to São Paulo and Rio de Janeiro, where he studied engineering at the Colégio Central.

During his studies in Rio de Janeiro, Sampaio worked as a drafter and taught mathematics in the Museu Nacional.

Sampaio graduated with a degree in civil engineering from the Polytechnic School in Rio de Janeiro in 1877 and returned to Santo Amaro. Reunited with mother, Sampaio managed to purchase the manumission of his three brothers Martinho, Ezequiel and Matias.

== Engineering and cartography ==
In 1879, Emperor Pedro II of Brazil named Sampaio to the national "Comissão Hidráulica" (Hydraulic Commission). He was the only Brazilian serving on a team of American engineers working to enlarge the port of Santos led by William Milnor Roberts. As part of this endeavour, Sampaio produced his first cartographic work, drawing the blueprints and survey charts of the port of Santos along with surveys of the São Francisco River. The expedition explored the river from its mouth, on the Atlantic Ocean, up to the navigable limit at the time, near the town of Pirapora in the then province of Minas Gerais. The return journey, inland through the north-eastern Brazilian state of Bahia, led to Sampaio's major cartographic work, the topographic survey of Chapada Diamantina, a mountain range in Bahia State, and his book O Rio São Francisco e a Chapada Diamantina, published in 1906, which later became a classic of Brazil's history and geography.

== Institutional memberships ==
Sampaio was one of the founders of the Escola Politécnica of São Paulo (Polytechnic School of São Paulo) in 1893 and of the Instituto Histórico e Geográfico de São Paulo (Historical and Geographical Institute of São Paulo) in 1894. He was also a member of the Instituto Geográfico e Histórico da Bahia (Geographic and Historical Institute of Bahia), serving as president in 1922, and a member of the Instituto Histórico e Geográfico Brasileiro (1902).

== Historical significance ==
Sampaio was the first person with an enslaved mother to become a federal deputy in Brazil's history, from 1927 to 1929.

His most important books were:

- O Rio São Francisco e a Chapada Diamantina (1906);
- O Tupi na Geografia Nacional (1901);
- Atlas dos Estados Unidos do Brasil (1908);
- Dicionário Histórico, Geográfico e Etnográfico do Brasil (1922);
- História da Fundação da Cidade do Salvador (posthumous).

Books about him:

- Theodoro Sampaio e a Chapada Diamantina (Trechos da expedição de 1879/1880), Otoniel Fernandes Neto, ed. do Author, Brasília, 2005. (ISBN 85-905834-1-4).
- Baianos Ilustres, Antônio Loureiro de Souza, Salvador, 1949.

A well-known, major street in the city of São Paulo, Rua Teodoro Sampaio, is dedicated to Sampaio.

== Bibliography ==
- "Theodoro Sampaio - nos sertões e nas cidades" Versal Editores, Rio de Janeiro, 2010. (ISBN 978-85-89309-26-4).
- O Rio São Francisco e a Chapada Diamantina, Teodoro Sampaio (José Carlos Barreto de Santana org.), Companhia das Letras, São Paulo, 2002. (ISBN 85-359-0256-2)
- Theodoro Sampaio e a Chapada Diamantina (Trechos da expedição de 1879/1880), Otoniel Fernandes Neto, ed. do Autor, Brasília, 2005. (ISBN 85-905834-1-4).
- Baianos Ilustres, Antônio Loureiro de Souza, Salvador, 1949.
