= Eva Estrada Kalaw =

Filipina politician

Eva Estrada-Kalaw
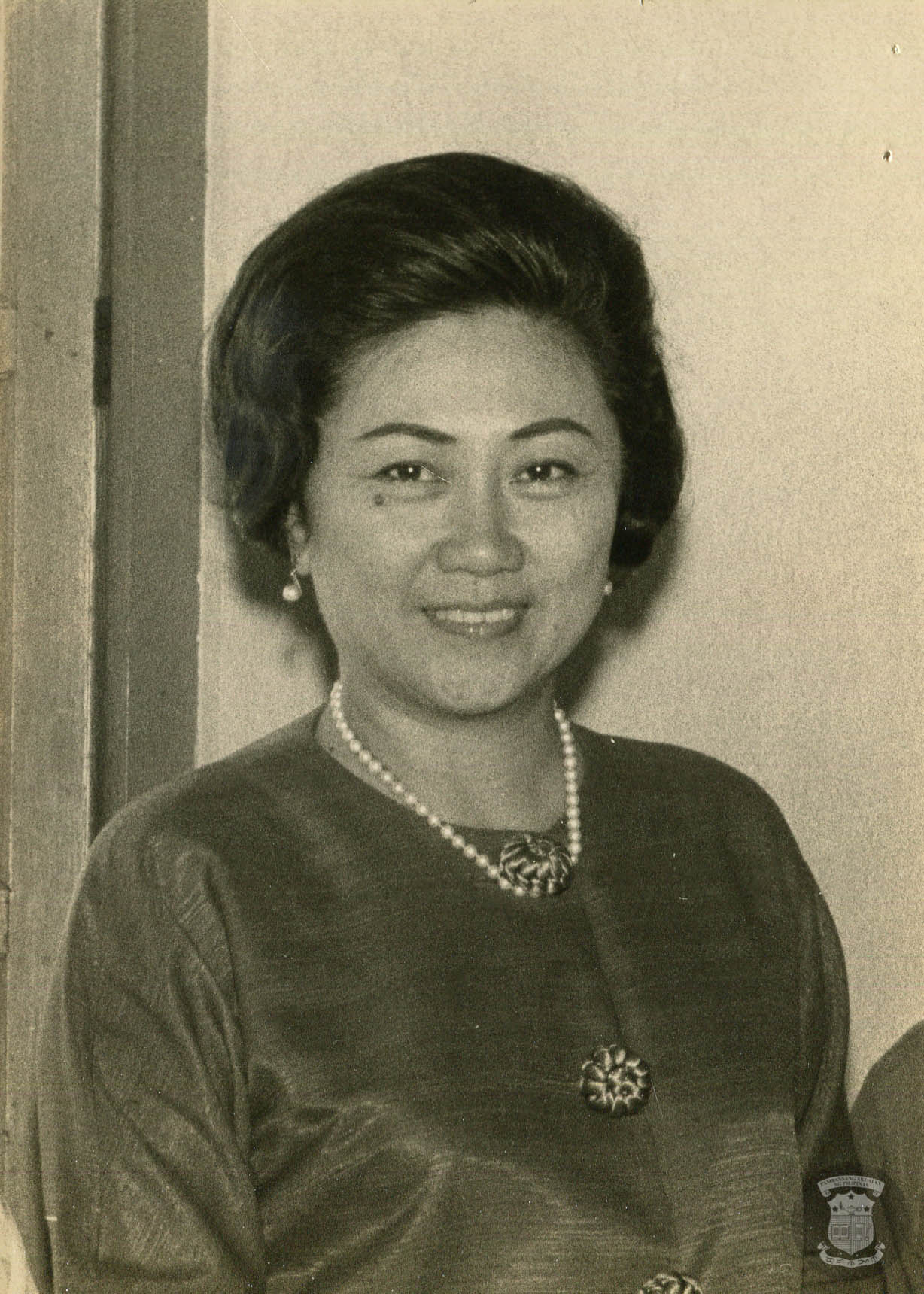

Representative of the Manila Economic and Cultural Office
- In office 1997–2001
- President: Fidel Ramos; Joseph Estrada

Senator of the Philippines
- In office December 30, 1965 – September 23, 1972

Member of the Regular Batasang Pambansa
- In office June 30, 1984 – March 25, 1986
- Constituency: Manila

Personal details
- Born: Evangelina Reynada Estrada; June 16, 1920 Murcia, Tarlac, Philippine Islands
- Died: May 25, 2017 (aged 96) Manila, Philippines
- Party: Independent (1992–2017)
- Other political affiliations: Liberal (1980–1991); Nacionalista (1953–1980; 1991–1992); UNIDO (1980–1987)
- Spouse: Teodoro "Teddy" V. Kalaw Jr. (m. 1944; died 1984)
- Children: 4, including Teodoro III
- Education: University of the Philippines (BS)
- Occupation: Politician
- Profession: Professor

Evangelina Reynada Estrada-Kalaw (June 16, 1920 – May 25, 2017) was a Filipina politician who served as a senator in the Senate of the Philippines from 1965 to 1972 during the presidency of Ferdinand Marcos. She was one of the key opposition figures against Marcos' 20-year authoritarian rule and was instrumental in his downfall during the People Power Revolution in 1986. As a senator, she wrote several laws relating to education in the Philippines, such as the salary standardization for public school personnel, the Magna Carta for Private Schools, the Magna Carta for Students, and an act to institute a charter for Barrio High Schools. She was also among the Liberal Party candidates injured during the Plaza Miranda bombing on August 21, 1971.

In 2001, after former president Joseph Estrada was arrested on April 25 for plunder, Kalaw was among the politicians who spoke against his arrest at pro-Estrada rallies that preceded the May 1 riots near Malacañang Palace.

== Early life ==
Kalaw was born in Murcia, Tarlac (present-day Concepcion, Tarlac), on June 16, 1920, to Dr. Salvador Estrada and Demetria Reynado. She took up Bachelor of Science in Education, with a major in home economics from the University of the Philippines in Manila. She was a member of the university's Sigma Delta Phi sorority.

An expert pistol shooter, she was once hailed the national ladies' champion in rapid-fire pistol shooting. She trained under the auspices of Filipino Olympian in shooting Martin Gison. After graduating from UP in 1940, Kalaw taught in several universities such as the Far Eastern University, National Teachers College and Centro Escolar University while taking up postgraduate studies in social work.

On June 11, 1944, she married entrepreneur and Bataan Death March veteran Teodoro "Teddy" V. Kalaw, Jr., son of former Batangas legislator Teodoro M. Kalaw, Sr. . They had four children: daughter Maria Eva "Chingbee" E. Kalaw-Cuenca, and sons Teodoro E. Kalaw III, Salvador and Tyrone. Her son Teodoro E. Kalaw, III followed in her footsteps and became a national pistol shooting champion and Olympic pistol shooter himself. Through her marriage to Kalaw, she became sister-in-law of fellow senator Maria V. Kalaw-Katigbak.

Kalaw was very active in social work and was part of the different civic organizations in the country. She was the first president of the Jayceerettes Organization, founder and national chairperson of Samahang Filipina, director of the League of Women Voters and the Chamber of Home Industries of the Philippines, board member of the Special Child Study Center for Retarded Children and chairperson of the Youth Welfare Council. She was also active in the Presidential Peace and Amelioration Campaign, the Rizal Red Cross, Anti–Tuberculosis of the Philippines and the Civic Assembly of Women's Clubs in the Philippine Association of the University Women. For her social work, she won a citation for being the Outstanding Volunteer Social Worker of the Year.

== Political career ==
=== First term ===
A member of the Nacionalista Party, Kalaw first entered politics in 1953 when she campaigned for Nacionalista presidential candidate and former Defense Secretary Ramon Magsaysay, who ran against the incumbent president Elpidio Quirino. In 1957, she also campaigned for Senator Claro M. Recto when he ran for president against incumbent president Carlos P. Garcia. During the Garcia administration, Kalaw headed the National Economic Protectionism Association, a non-government organization that staunchly promoted economic protectionism and promotion of Filipino businesses and products.

During the 1965 Senatorial Elections, Kalaw was part of the senatorial slate of the Nacionalista Party candidate Ferdinand Marcos and won. As senator, she introduced a total of 41 bills, including ones for salary increases of public school teachers (RA 5158); the creation of Local School Boards (RA 5447) and of the Barrio High School Charter/Magna Carta for Private Schools (RA 6054); the Educational Financing Act (RA 6728) and the inclusion of the presidents of student councils in the Board of Regents of all state colleges and universities. During her term, she was the chairperson of the Senate Committee on Games, Amusements, and Tourism, as well as the Senate Committee on National Minorities.

=== Second term and martial law ===
Relations between Kalaw and the ruling Nacionalista Party were uneasy under the Marcos administration. The increasing authoritarianism of the Marcos government led Kalaw to become one of the few people within the party to criticize the administration. By 1971, convinced that the party will not include her in the senatorial slate for the upcoming elections, Kalaw decided to accept the offer from her cousin, opposition senator Benigno Aquino Jr., to become guest candidate of the Liberal Party. During the party's miting de avance at Plaza Miranda in Quiapo, Manila on August 21, 1971, Kalaw was among the senatorial candidates present when an unidentified assailant threw two hand grenades at the stage. She wasn't seriously injured, but fellow party members such as Senator Jovito Salonga, Manila mayoralty candidate Ramon Bagatsing and Manila city councilor Ambrosio Lorenzo Jr. were among those seriously harmed. On election day, however, Kalaw, together with five other Liberal Party senatorial candidates—Jovito Salonga, Genaro Magsaysay, John Henry Osmeña, Eddie Ilarde and Ramon Mitra Jr.—won six out of eight Senate seats. She was the first-ever female Filipino senator to win two consecutive terms.

Since the Plaza Miranda incident, Kalaw dedicated her second term to becoming full-time opposition to President Marcos. However, Marcos' declaration of Martial Law and abolition of Congress cut short her term. Nevertheless, she continued in her activism in opposition of Martial Law, resulting in her imprisonment at Fort Bonifacio twice, including one in 1979 for allegedly participating in a coup attempt against Marcos.

=== Assemblywoman of Manila ===
Following her release from prison, Kalaw worked to unite a fragmented opposition by bringing together the remnants of the Liberal and Nacionalista parties to form United Nationalist Democratic Organization (UNIDO), which would serve as the main opposition party against Marcos' Kilusang Bagong Lipunan. The assassination of opposition figure Benigno Aquino Jr. on August 21, 1983 further emboldened the opposition parties to fight Marcos, and in 1984, Kalaw ran as assemblywoman and won one of six seats in the Regular Batasang Pambansa for Manila. She was joined by fellow UNIDO assemblymen Jose Atienza Jr., Carlos Fernando, Gemiliano Lopez Jr. and Gonzalo Puyat II who occupied four of the remaining seats (the last seat going to KBL candidate Arturo Tolentino).

=== Vice presidential bid ===
In November 1985, President Marcos called for a snap presidential election in order to convince the American government that he is still in control of the Philippines amid the economic crisis that affected the country since the assassination of Aquino. Kalaw, along with Senator Salvador Laurel, were among the opposition members who expressed their intention to run for president. However, majority of UNIDO members preferred Aquino's widow Corazon Aquino as the party's official presidential candidate. Both Laurel and Kalaw decided to give in to Aquino after nationwide signature campaign gathered more than a million signatures urging Aquino to run for president. In her choice of vice president, however, Aquino chose Laurel over Kalaw, who decided to unsuccessfully run as a third vice presidential candidate under the Kalaw-wing of the Liberal Party. However, the snap elections on February 7, 1986 were mired with allegations of rampant fraud by the government, and the tandem of Aquino and Laurel came to power as president and vice president respectively after a peaceful People Power Revolution from February 23–25, 1986 that toppled the Marcos regime.

=== Post-EDSA Revolution ===
After the People Power Revolution, Kalaw joined the opposition against Corazon Aquino's administration. She was among the few UNIDO members who joined the Grand Alliance for Democracy, a coalition party that consisted mostly of defectors from Marcos' Kilusang Bagong Lipunan, Nacionalista Party and the UNIDO. She was one of GAD's senatorial candidates during the 1987 Senatorial Elections but lost. In 1992, Kalaw was reunited with former Vice President Laurel, and the two ran together as the Nacionalista Party's candidates for President and Vice President during the 1992 Philippine presidential elections, (Note: Salvador Laurel's first running mate was Rodolfo Ganzon, the former mayor of Iloilo City but Ganzon later withdrew from the vice-presidential race. Laurel subsequently recruited Kalaw to be his running mate.) but they both lost to Aquino's Defense Secretary Fidel V. Ramos and former actor and Senator Joseph Estrada.

Kalaw's last foray in public service was her appointment as managing director and resident representative of the Philippines at the Manila Economic and Cultural Office, the country's de facto embassy in Taipei, Taiwan during the Ramos and Estrada administrations.

== Awards ==
Among Kalaw's many awards, the most prestigious was the Mahatma Gandhi Freedom Award which was conferred to her on April 2, 1985 by the Department of Anthropology of the College of William & Mary in Virginia, United States. The award is given annually to outstanding scholars or public figures who, given by personal example, have given meaning and substance to freedom. Among other recipients of the award were her cousin Senator Benigno Aquino Jr., Senator Jovito Salonga, K. R. Narayanan, H. R. Choudry and K. S. Bajpai.

== Death ==
Kalaw died on May 25, 2017, at 96 due to an undisclosed ailment. She is survived by her daughter Chingbee Kalaw-Cuenca, sons Teodoro E. Kalaw, III, Salvador and Tyrone, as well as 13 grandchildren and 12 great-grandchildren. Her remains were laid to rest at Loyola Memorial Park in Parañaque.
