= Our Lady of Fatima Academy, Davao City =

Roman Catholic school in Davao City, Philippines

Our Lady of Fatima Academy
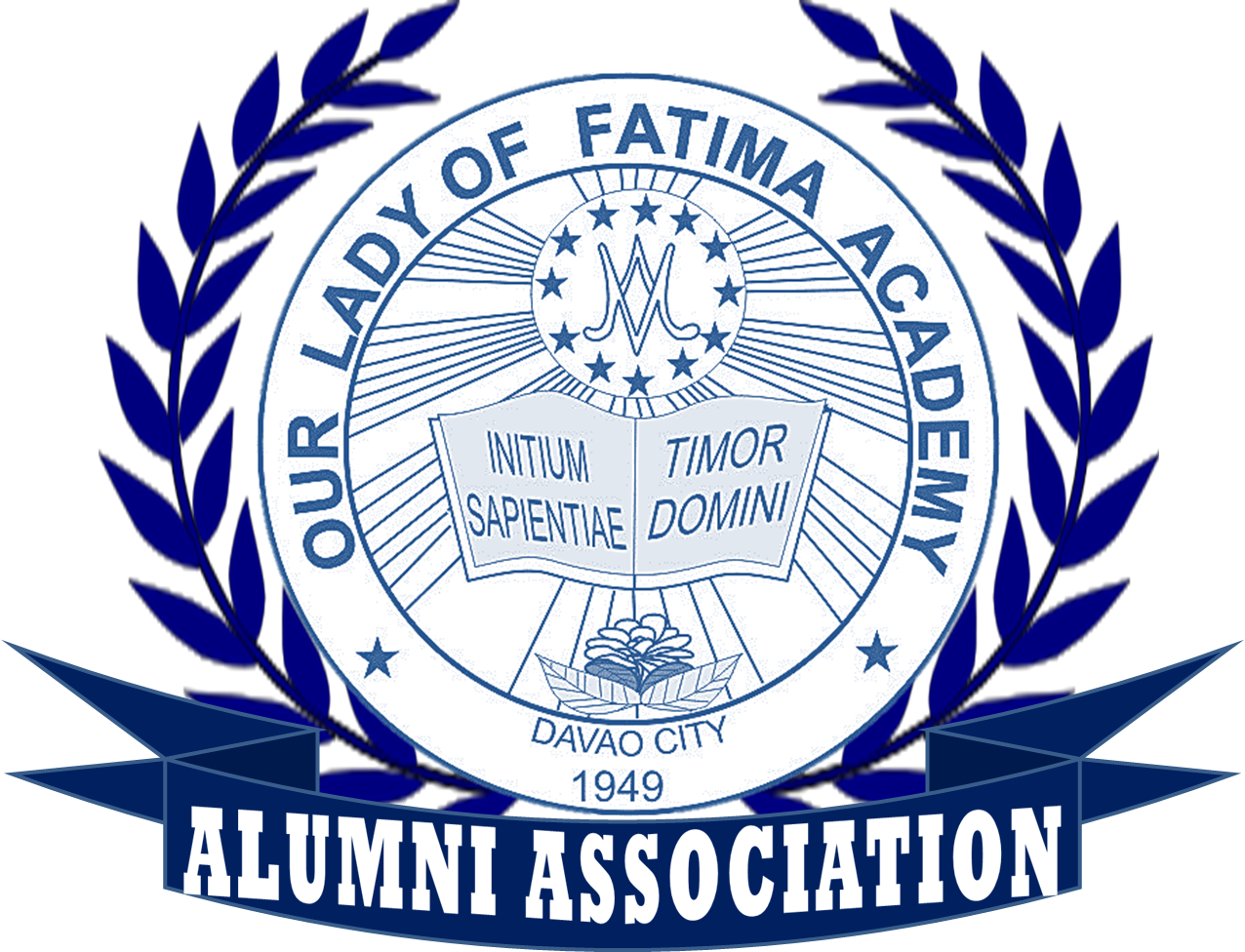

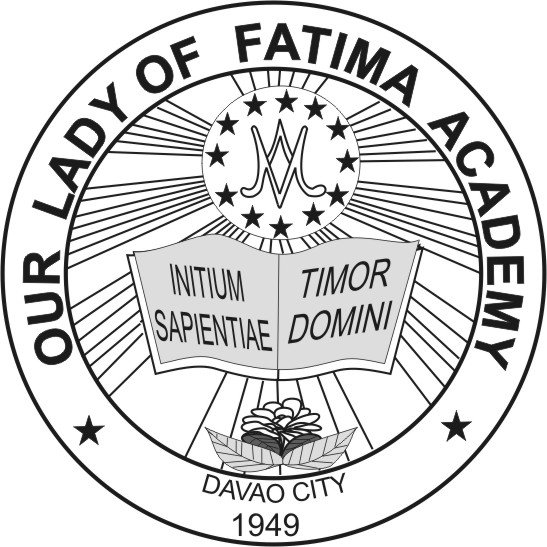
- Official Seal

Location
- Fatima Street, Davao City, Philippines
- Coordinates: 7°04′11″N 125°37′04″E

Information
- Other name: Our Lady of Fatima Academy of Davao, Inc. (OLFAI)
- Former name: Immaculate Conception College- Piapi School
- Type: Private school
- Motto: Initium sapientiae timor Domini (The fear of the Lord is the beginning of wisdom)
- Religious affiliation(s): RVM (Roman Catholic)
- Patron saint(s): Blessed Virgin Mary
- Established: 1949
- Directress/Principal: S. Ma. Preciosa M. Rusiana, RVM
- Color(s): White & blue
- Affiliations: DACS
- Website: www.olfai.edu.ph

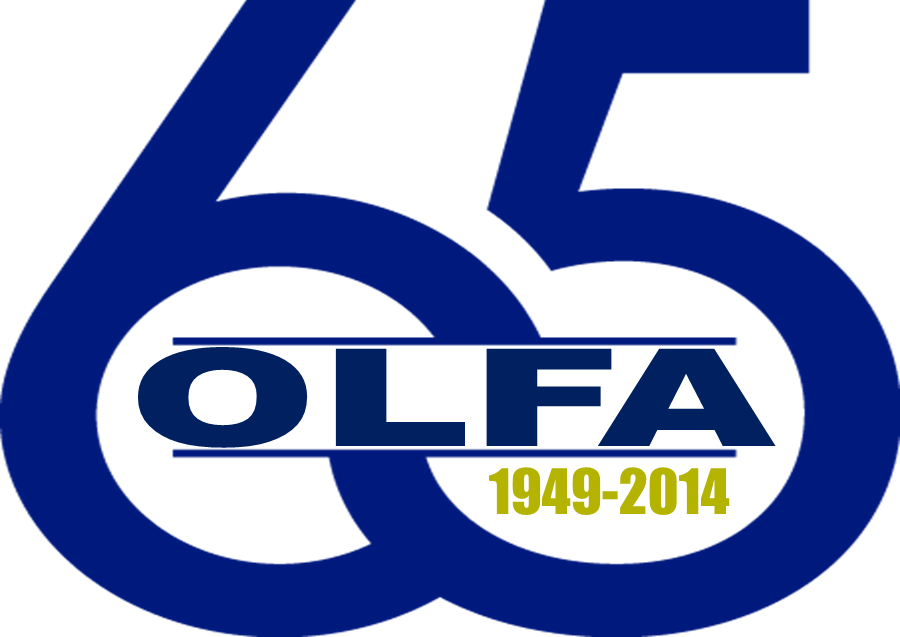
65 years of Existence & Excellence

Our Lady of Fatima Academy (also referred as OLFA) is a private Roman Catholic school run by the Religious of the Virgin Mary (RVM) in Davao City. It started in 1949 as Immaculate Conception College- Piapi School.

== History ==
In 1949, the Immaculate Conception College, Davao City, opened a free school in the slums of Piapi in this city through the initiative of the ICC Directress, Mother Maria Alberta Alviar, RVM. The old San Guillermo chapel served as classroom both for the kindergarten and grade one pupils with Mrs. Candida Josue and Miss Pancito as the first teachers.

The following year, an annex was constructed to accommodate second and third-grade classes, with Mrs. Leonida Salas joining as an additional teacher. By 1952, the school had expanded its offerings to include a complete primary education curriculum. As enrollment grew, the need for more space became apparent, leading Rev. Father Gaudiose Gagno, PME, the parish priest of Fatima Parish, to secure a larger facility for both the church and the school at the intersection of Fatima and Aurora Streets. Due to limited space, some classes were held at the Church and nearby houses of a benefactor. Teachers and school needs were provided then by the Immaculate Conception College until such time when OLFA could stand on its own. With the help of ICC, OLFA parents and teachers worked for the improvement of the school.

In 1954, the ICC- Piapi School was formally Changed to Our Lady of Fatima Academy. Four years later the grade school was granted the government recognition. A new building was constructed in 1960 to accommodate the increase in enrollment. The complete secondary course was recognized in 1962. Enrollment continued to increase and so a new building was constructed in 1987; blessed and occupied in 1989. The wooden dilapidated building was knocked down for another construction of a concrete grade school building, blessed and made ready in 1994.

In 1998, OLFA has produced one Most Outstanding Graduate in Davao City besting fifty- one other Valedictorians in the city and suburbs. On December 20, 1998, the school joined the start of a year -long Golden Jubilee of the Year of God the Father celebration and in January 1999, OLFA also commemorated its Golden Jubilee of Foundation.

Enrollment continued to increase so on March 27, 2002, the laying of the cornerstone of a four-storey building took place. The actual construction started on April 2 of the same year. The improvement continued with the renovation of offices. The year also marked the participation of OLFA in the Educational Service Contracting (ESC)scheme of the government.

In 2005, the RVM community headed by S. Ma. Lydia C. Daga, RVM, initiated the purchase of a 234 square meter lot fronting Fatima Church for the construction of a four-storey building to accommodate the continuing increase of enrollees every year. The groundbreaking was done on March 20, 2006. The building was blessed on December 30, 2006, and became the second home of the kindergarten and the intermediate classes since 2007. To continue the improvement of the school facilities needed to provide quality instruction, the administration had the faculty and audio-visual rooms renovated in the summer of 2007.

As the buildings became concrete, the need to improve instruction and facilities were priorities hand-in-hand with the building preparations. Improvement of facilities goes on to upgrade services to the school community. Computer lessons were incorporated into the curriculum. And therefore construction of computer laboratories, Speech laboratory and upgraded science laboratory, Home Economics and Industrial Arts rooms were also seen into. In addition to that, right during S. Ma. Bernadette G. Suico, RVM's last reigning for Principal and Directress in 2013, all rooms are fully air-conditioned for improving enough ventilation.

OLFA is up into the upgrading of the whole school. It has applied for accreditation with the Philippine Accrediting Association of Schools, Colleges and Universities (PAASCU). Currently, July 24–25 the PAASCU Accreditors will be visiting the school

== Model ==
Venerable Ignacia del Espíritu Santo, also known as Mother Ignacia (1 February 1663 – 10 September 1748) was a Filipino Religious Sister of the Roman Catholic Church. Known for her acts of piety and religious poverty, founded the Congregation of the Sisters of the Religious of the Virgin Mary, the first native Filipino female congregation with approved pontifical status in what is now the Republic of the Philippines. Mother Ignacia del Espiritu Santo was declared Venerable by Pope Benedict XVI in 2007.

== School seal ==
The school seal is derived from the seal of Religious of the Virgin Mary. Encircled by rays which represent the far-reaching zeal and charity, the central device is the A and M monogram representing the words Auspice Maria ("under the guidance of Mary"; commonly called the "Ave Maria"). Surrounding the Auspice Maria are twelve stars which stand for the twelve God-given prerogatives of Mary, the Mother of God and Mother of the Church through which people receive of her special and maternal blessings. Rays emanate from the starry monogram in seven groups, representing the light and wisdom from God through Jesus Christ, the light of the World, and through Mary and reflect the Congregation's motto, "To Jesus through Mary". Under the monogram is an open book bearing the Latin inscription, Initium sapientiae Timor Domini, which is beginning of Proverbs 9:10: "The fear of the LORD is the beginning of wisdom". It expresses the filial fear, a disposition of profound reverence, awe and love for God, the Source of all wisdom, grace and life. The sampaguita beneath the book symbolizes the purity of heart of Mary and Mother Ignacia and the Filipino origin of the school.

The school name is written on the upper part of the seal and written below is Davao City, the locale of the school and 1949, the year the school was established. This logo is literally the same as every RVM Schools UIC, St. Mary's it just changes the school name and the location of course.

== School publication ==
The Vision is the official publication of the school. It has a two-fold objective. First, it is primarily to develop the literary and artistic talents of pupils and students by giving them the opportunity to express their opinions, visions and reflections through the written form. Second, it aims to create wholesome school spirit by keeping the pupils and students informed of past, present, and future activities. The recent school publication named the Vision is currently practicing in creating articles especially intramurals is fast approaching and now the Vision is trying to train new students to replace the current senior editors that has a higher chance of leaving the school especially they consist of grade 10 students of OLFA (2018).

== Gallery ==
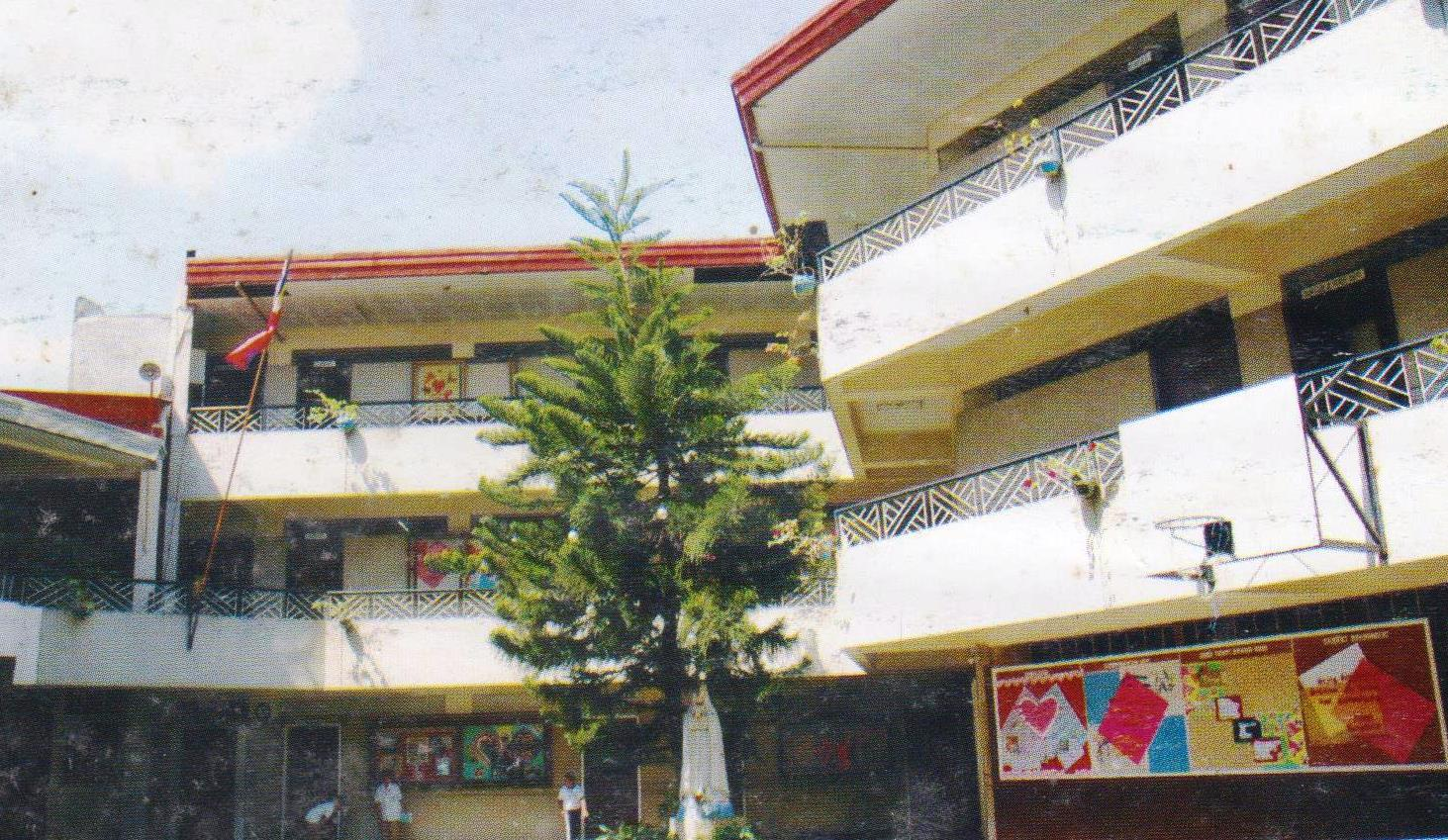
Grade school Building

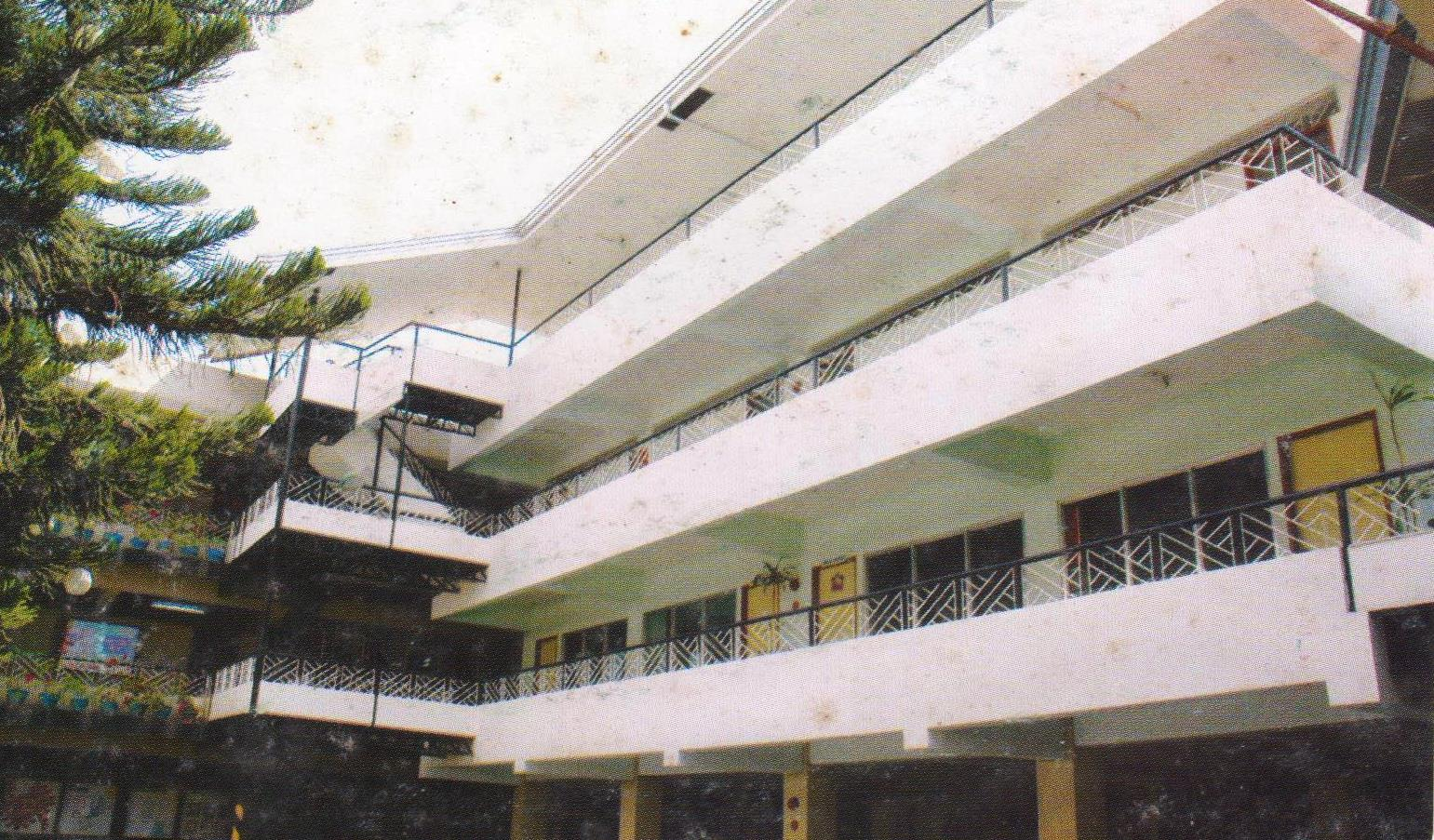
Highschool Building
