= Atang de la Rama =

Filipina actress and singer (1902–1991)

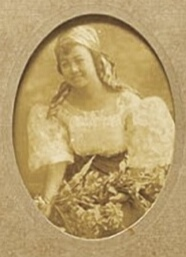
- Atang de la Rama from a 1919 performance invitation of "Dalagang Bukid" at the Teatro Zorilla
- Born: Honorata de la Rama; January 11, 1902; Pandacan, Manila, Insular Government of the Philippine Islands, U.S.
- Died: July 11, 1991 (aged 89); Manila, Philippines
- Education: Centro Escolar de Señoritas (pharmacy)
- Occupations: Singer theater actress
- Years active: 1919–1956
- Spouse: Amado V. Hernandez (m. 1932; died 1970)
- Awards: Order of National Artists of the Philippines

Honorata de la Rama-Hernandez (January 11, 1902 – July 11, 1991), commonly known as Atang de la Rama, was a singer and bodabil performer who became the first Filipina film actress.

In March 2026, Philippine Daily Inquirer enlisted her as one of "the Filipina 'firsts' [who] rarely appear in textbooks, but their contributions helped change the course of history and widened opportunities for women", alongside Ignacia del Espíritu Santo, Luisa Gonzaga de León, Martha de San Bernardo, Librada Avelino, Asunción Ventura, Pura Villanueva Kalaw and Consuelo Padilla Osorio.

== Biography ==
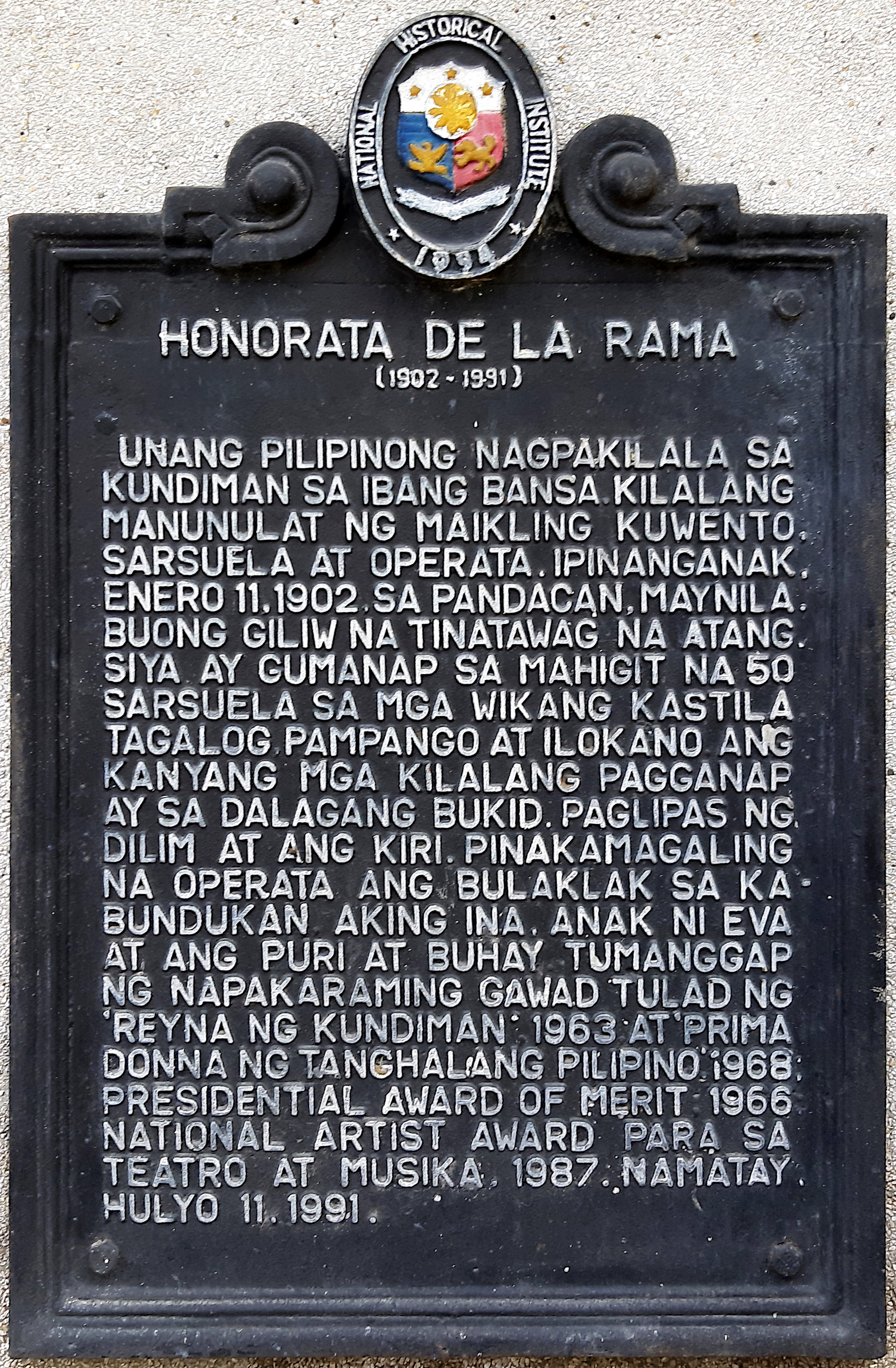
Historical marker installed in 1994 at the tomb of Atang de la Rama inside the Manila North Cemetery

Atang de la Rama was born in Pandacan, Manila on January 11, 1902. By the age of 7, she was already starring in Spanish zarzuelas such as Mascota, Sueño de un Vals, and Marina. At the age of 15, she starred in the sarsuela Dalagang Bukid, where she became known for singing the song "Nabasag na Banga".

During the American occupation of the Philippines, Atang de la Rama fought for the dominance of the kundiman, an important Philippine folk song, and the sarsuela, which is a musical play that focused on contemporary Filipino issues such as usury, cockfighting, and colonial mentality.

Generations of Filipino artists and audiences consider Atang de la Rama's vocal and acting talents as responsible for much of the success of original Filipino sarsuelas like Dalagang Bukid, and dramas like Veronidia. She has also been a theatrical producer, writer and talent manager. She was the producer and the writer of plays such as Anak ni Eva and Bulaklak ng Kabundukan. For her achievements and contributions to the art form, she was hailed Queen of the Kundiman and of the Sarsuela in 1979, at the age of 74.

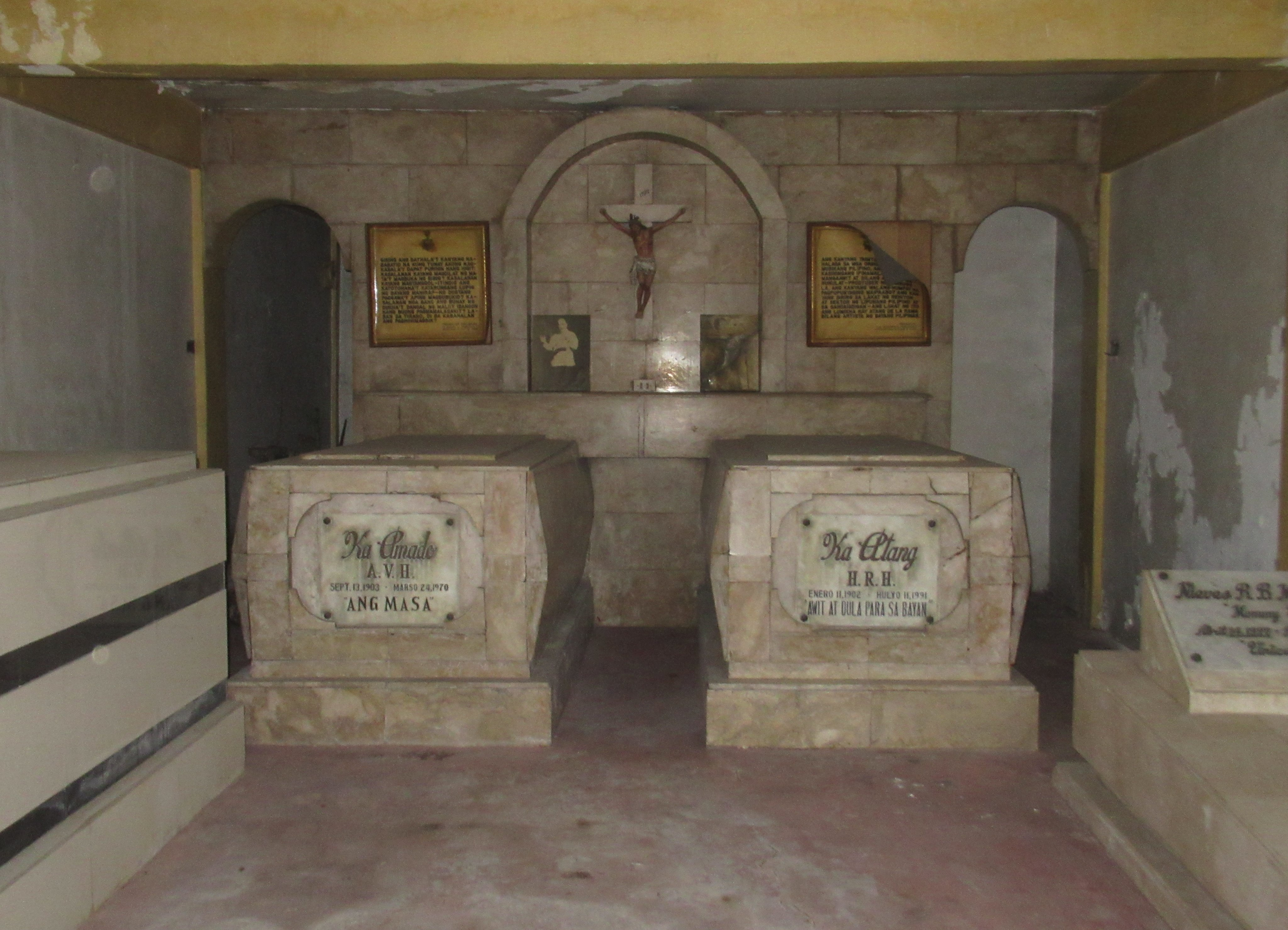
Hernandez's & de la Rama's graves at their mausoleum (Manila North Cemetery).

Atang believed that art should be for everyone; not only did she perform in major Manila theaters such as the Teatro Libertad and the Teatro Zorilla, but also in cockpits and open plazas in Luzon, the Visayas, and Mindanao. She also made an effort to bring the kundiman and sarsuela to the indigenous peoples of the Philippine such as the Igorots, the Aetas, and the Mangyans. She was also at the forefront of introducing Filipino culture to foreign audiences. At the height of her career, she sang kundimans and other Filipino songs in concerts in such cities as Hawaii, San Francisco, Los Angeles, New York City, Hong Kong, Shanghai, and Tokyo.

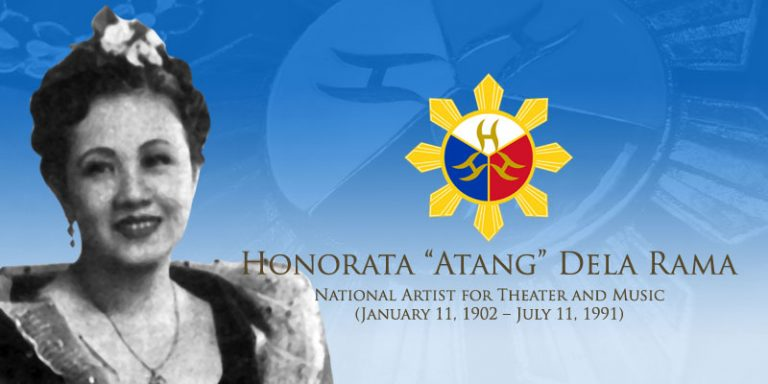
Cultural profile of Honorata "Atang" dela Rama from the "Order of National Artists" (National Commission for Culture and the Arts)

On May 8, 1987, "for her sincere devotion to original Filipino theater and music, her outstanding artistry as singer, and as sarsuela actress-playwright-producer, her tireless efforts to bring her art to all sectors of Filipino society and to the world," President Corazon C. Aquino proclaimed Atang de la Rama a National Artist of the Philippines for Theater and Music.

De la Rama died on July 11, 1991. She was married to National Artist for Literature, Amado V. Hernandez.

== Legacy ==
A street inside the Cultural Center of the Philippines Complex in Pasay City is named in her honor and memory.
