= Librada Avelino =

Filipina educator who co-founded the Centro Escolar University

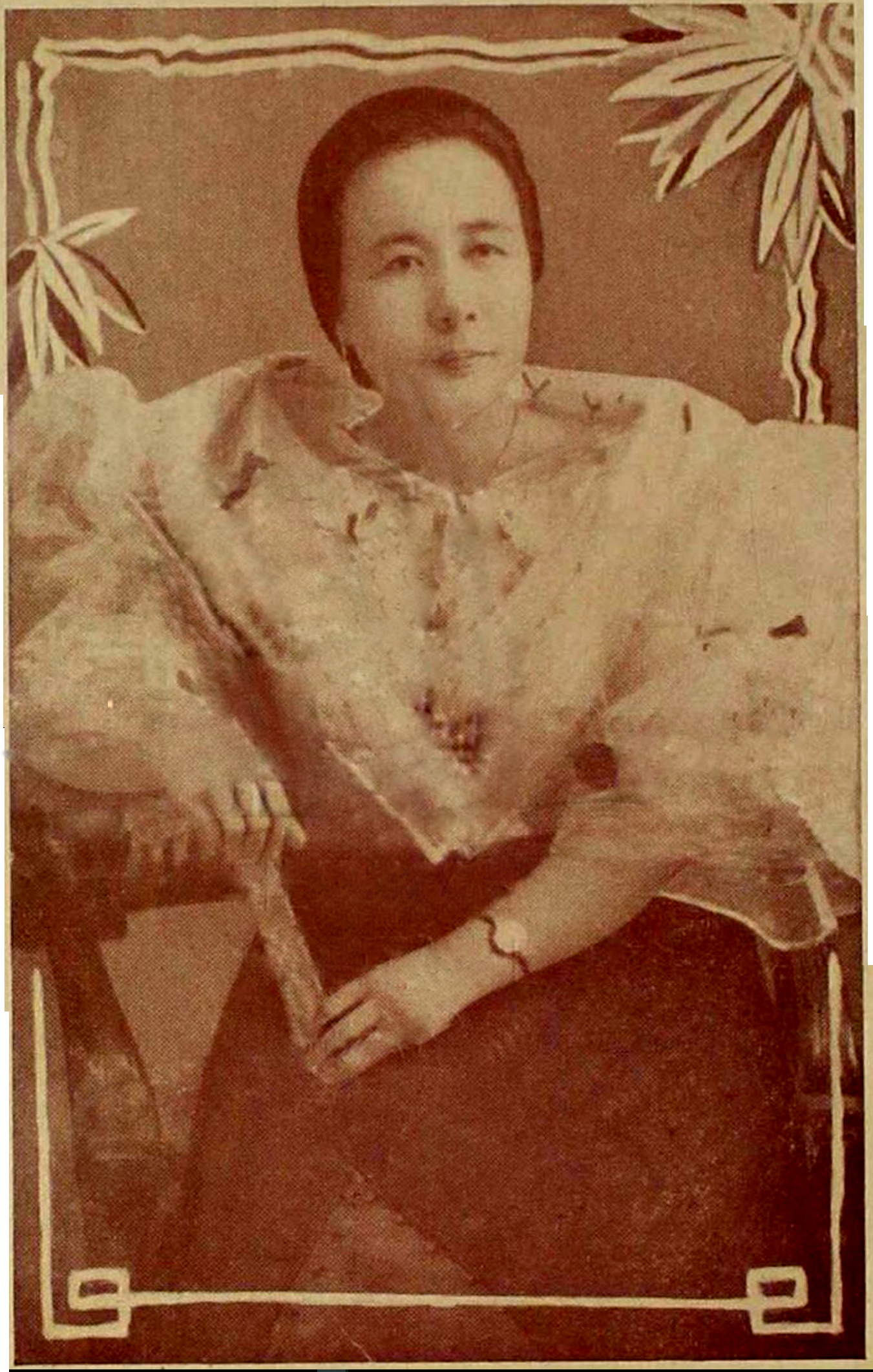
- Born: Librada Avelino Mañgali; January 17, 1873; Quiapo, Manila, Captaincy General of the Philippines
- Died: November 9, 1934 (aged 61); Ermita, Manila, Insular Government of the Philippine Islands
- Resting place: Centro Escolar University Catholic Chapel, San Miguel, Manila
- Other name: Ada Avelino
- Occupations: Teacher, school founder
- Years active: 1889–1934
- Known for: co-founding the Centro Escolar University

Librada Avelino (January 17, 1873 – November 9, 1934) was a Filipina educator who co-founded the Centro Escolar University. She was the first woman to earn a teaching certificate from the Spanish authorities when she passed her examination in 1889. Continuing her education, Avelino was also certified as a secondary teacher in 1893. After establishing her own girls' school in Pandacan, she was forced to flee to Manila when in 1896, the Philippine Revolution brought troops to Pandacan. Reopening a school in the capital, she operated until the Spain ceded the country to the United States and the educational authorities changed the requirements, implementing English language curricula. To learn English, she agreed to take a post as principal of the Pandacan Girls' School, believing that teaching the language would help her learn it faster. She also took English classes and studied English briefly in Hong Kong in 1901.

In 1907, Avelino joined her friend Carmen de Luna and lawyer/educator Fernando Salas to found the Centro Escolar de Señoritas, a school which organized courses from kindergarten through high school for girls. The school was the first non-parochial institution in the country and based its curriculum on a modern, liberal model, attempting to equalize the education of girls with what was offered to boys. As the school grew, additional buildings were acquired for lectures and dormitories and by 1921 Avelino expanded the offerings to include tertiary, first offering a bachelor's degree program in pharmacy. She was awarded an honorary master's degree in pedagogy by the University of the Philippines in 1930. From 1930, the Centro Escolar de Señoritas operated as an accredited university and was incorporated with a name change to Centro Escolar University in 1932.

Avelino directed the school until shortly before her death from cancer in 1934. There are multiple monuments in the Philippines which bear her name. The Centro Escolar University bestows an award in her honor to Asian women who are recognized leaders. The school which she founded has continued to offer education for over 100 years.

== Early life ==
Librada Avelino Mañgali was born on January 17, 1873, in Quiapo, Manila, in the Philippine Islands, then part of the Spanish Empire, to Francisca Mañgali and Pedro Avelino. Soon after her birth, the household, which consisted of her parents and her father's sister Juana Avelino, moved to Pandacan. Her father, an intellectual, worked in a pharmacy and also operated a store which sold sundries, including fabrics, needles and thread, cigars, and other items. When her father was working at the pharmacy, his sister Juana ran the store. Though her early education began at home, from five or six years old, Avelino, who was called "Ada", was sent to the public girls' school run by Luisa Bacho. This was the first school to offer education to girls and included primary courses in reading, writing, and mathematics, as well as recitation of prayers.

When Avelino was seven, her mother died and about three years later her father remarried to Paula Arcilla, who was determined to have a close relationship with her step-daughter. As Avelino wanted to learn more than was typically offered to girls, Maestra Bacho instructed her in rudimentary domestic science, geography and Spanish grammar, and introduced her to more difficult mathematical studies. She also studied advanced syntax and language with Fermin Raymundo, a local Spanish grammarian, as well as music, including the piano, with Ladislao Bonus. Upon completion of her primary schooling, Avelino moved to Manila to attend the municipal Santa Cruz School, but after one year transferred to the private institution run by Margarita Lopez in Tondo. The school was a preparatory institution which trained girls in the subjects needed for the teaching examination. After completing the courses in 1889, Avelino faced a jury and successfully passed the civil exam for elementary school teachers, becoming the first woman to receive certification in the Spanish era.

== Career ==
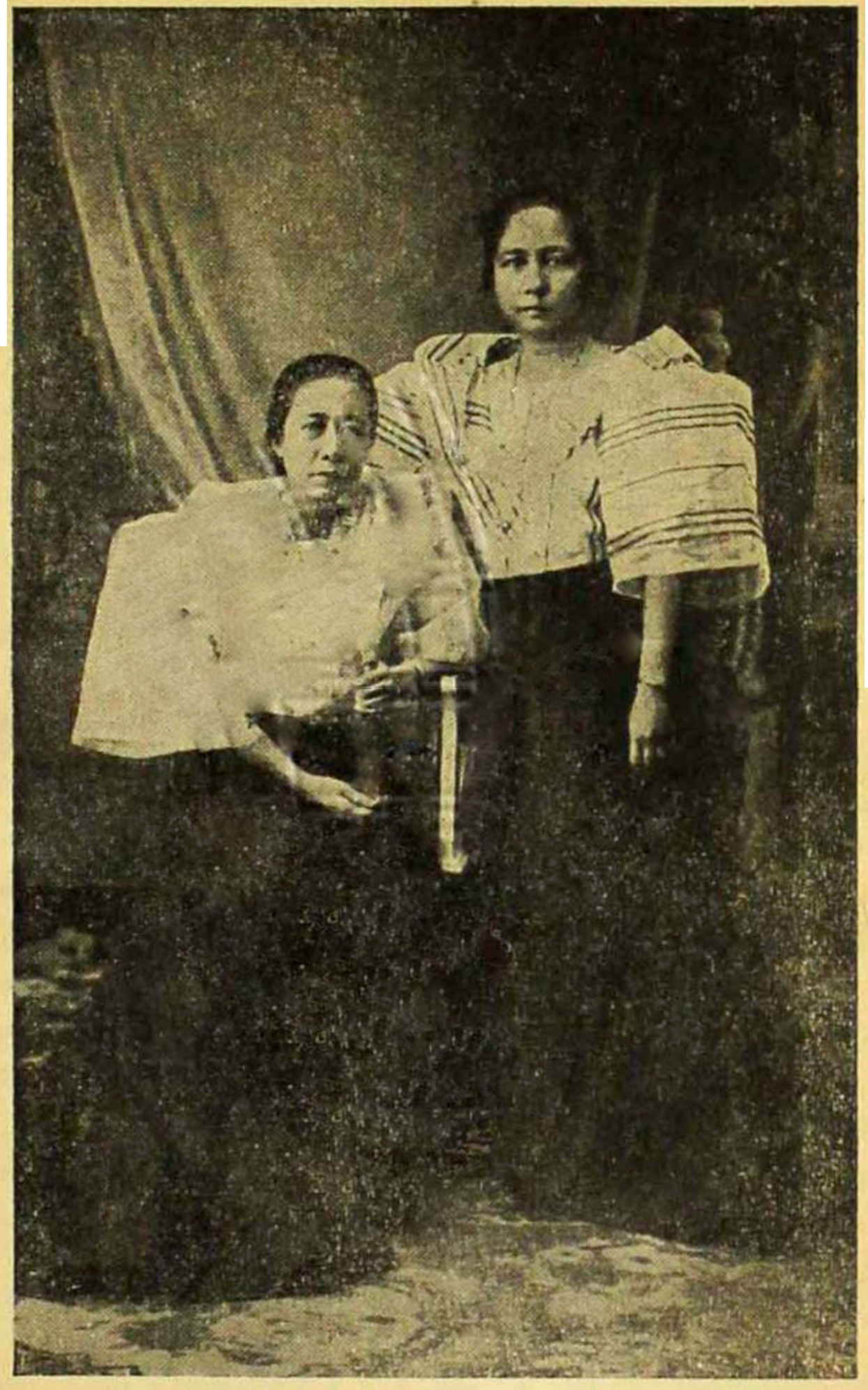
(left) Avelino and (right) Carmen de Luna in 1911

Upon receipt of her diploma, Avelino, with the support of her father and step-mother, opened a free school in Pandacan. She modeled it on Lopez's school and trained students for the teaching examination. As the school grew rapidly, to further her own education, Avelino studied dressmaking and embroidery at the Concordia College and then took a course offered by the sisters of the Assumption Convent, which allowed her to earn a certificate to teach high school in 1893. During her courses, Avelino met Carmen de Luna, who would become her collaborator and companion for the rest of her life. Activities at Avelino's school initially continued at the onset of the Philippine Revolution in 1896, but when the United States forces arrived in Pandacan, she suspended her courses. On the advice of her father, she fled to Manila days before her hometown was reduced to ashes by the invading soldiers. By the time her family, which included three step-siblings, was able to join her, they had lost their home, as well as their business in the conflict. Assisted by brothers Vicente and Lucas Gonzalez, Avelino was loaned a property in Santa Cruz in which to reopen her school. As the school grew, it moved from Fernandez Street to San Sebastian, now R. Hidalgo Street. She was soon joined by her cousin Margarita "Garit" Oliva and Carmen de Luna.

On the conclusion of the revolution in 1898, the United States, under its sovereign authority, established new rules in schools requiring teaching the English language. As Avelino did not speak English, she volunteered to teach at the girls' school in Pandacan, believing she would learn faster by trying to teach the language to others. She was appointed as the first Filipina principal in the United States era. Simultaneously, she studied in the mornings with an American teacher, while also taking night courses in Sampaloc with tutor Mauricio Somosa to enhance her language skills. In 1901, though hostilities continued over the terms of the Treaty of Paris and there were discussions as to whether the Philippines would gain independence or be annexed by the United States, Avelino wrote the school superintendent, David Prescott Barrows asking for a leave of absence to study English abroad and approval to be reinstated upon her return as principal of the Pandacan Girls' School. Securing his approval, she closed the school and accompanied the Gonzalez family to Hong Kong, where she studied for half the year, but had to return due to illness of one of their party. Upon her return, she resumed her duties as school principal, but conflict with the American principal of the boys' school, caused her to resign her position at the end of the 1906 term.

The insurrection continued until 1902, and Avelino's step-mother died in 1905. Still longing to open a school, when she came out of mourning in 1907, Avelino sought the advice of Fernando Salas, a lawyer from a family of educators, and her friend Carmen de Luna. They decided to invest (Note: While Varona and de la Llana state the three founders and initial donors were Avelino, de Luna and Salas, Artigas y Cuerva says that the initial investment of ₱1,000 was divided between Avelino, de Luna, María de Salas, (Fernando's wife?) and Josué Soncuya. Avelino died intestate and in a lawsuit which followed Soncuya, the plaintiff alleged that in 1910, he, Avelino and de Luna organized the corporation "Centro Escolar de Señoritas". This would indicate Soncuya was not one of the initial founders, but invested three years after the school was opened in 1907.) in opening a school in Manila which would be called the Centro Escolar de Señoritas (Central School of Ladies), modeled after a school Salas was running the Centro Escolar de Varones. (Central School of Men). Each contributed ₱250 and used it to found the school located at 841 Iris Street, later called Azcarraga Street. Having little capital, but wanting to establish a modern, liberal school, Avelino approached educated women like Maria del Pilar Francisco, the first woman lawyer in the Philippines; Felisa and Domingo Francisco, cousins of Maria; sisters Filomena and Ildefonsa Amor; her cousin Garit Oliva; and Constancia P. Arrieta, all having graduated from Normal School. Salas proposed Josué Soncuya, a historian and lawyer; Manuel Ravago, a journalist and orator; and Alberto Campos, a former soldier of the Spanish army, and a journalist and educator. Soon after proposing his candidates, Salas withdrew his capital and ceased his involvement with the school.

The idea behind the school was to offer girls the same opportunities as boys in education. At a time when few opportunities for girls' education existed, Avelino argued that women's responsibility for raising children required them to have the education needed to instill moral responsibility and patriotism to keep the country free. Her shrewd merging of girls' education and nationalist interests swayed fathers with daughters on more than one occasion to send them to her school. The Centro Escolar de Señoritas was the first non-sectarian school in the country. Once the basic staff had been recruited, the school began operations under Avelino's leadership, accepting boarders, half-boarders and day students for girls from kindergarten to high school with 27 students in June 1907. By 1910, there were over 300 students and by 1914 over 500. As a private school, the institution was not compelled to comply with the Department of Public Instruction requirement for teaching in English, and chose to present bilingual classes to accommodate those students who did not have full command of English. As one of the leading feminists of the period, when Carrie Chapman Catt and Aletta Jacobs visited the Philippines in 1912, Avelino met with them during one of their scheduled stops.

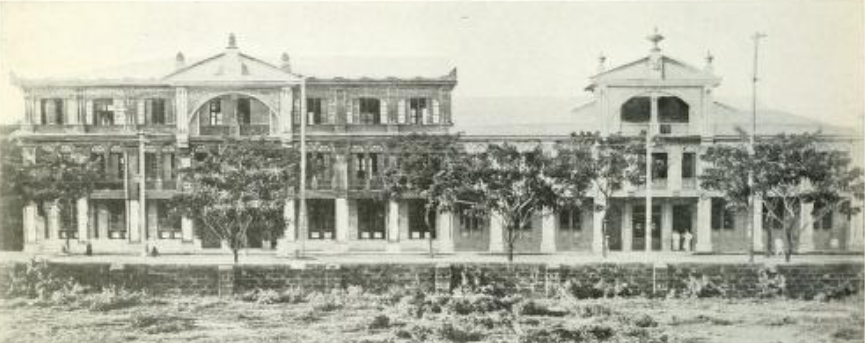
Centro Escolar de Señoritas in 1920, in its original form (Bahay na bato structure) and address (Calle Azcarraga across the San Sebastian Church; currently occupied by the Laperal Apartments)

Short on space, Avelino began buying up adjoining properties to increase both the number of lecture halls, as well as dormitory space. Around 1917, they moved to a newly built facility located at 2265 Azcarraga Street with over 650 students and by 1920 the school was the largest women's institution in the country. By 1921, Avelino was determined to launch a university and offer tertiary education. The first college to offer a bachelor's degree program was the school of pharmacy. Her plan included opening 10 colleges, but after pharmacy, she succeeded in opening six more: The College of Liberal Arts was founded in 1922, the College of Education in 1923, the College of Dentistry in 1924, the College of Law in 1925, the College of Medicine in 1929 and College of Optometry in 1930. Shortly after her father's death, in 1930 she was conferred an honorary master's degree in pedagogy by the University of the Philippines. Officially, from 1930, the Centro Escolar de Señoritas operated as a university and was incorporated with a name change to Centro Escolar University in 1932. Because of the inability to secure a hospital facility for students to gain practical experience, the government withheld accreditation of the Medical College, which was forced to close after four years of operation.

== Death and legacy ==
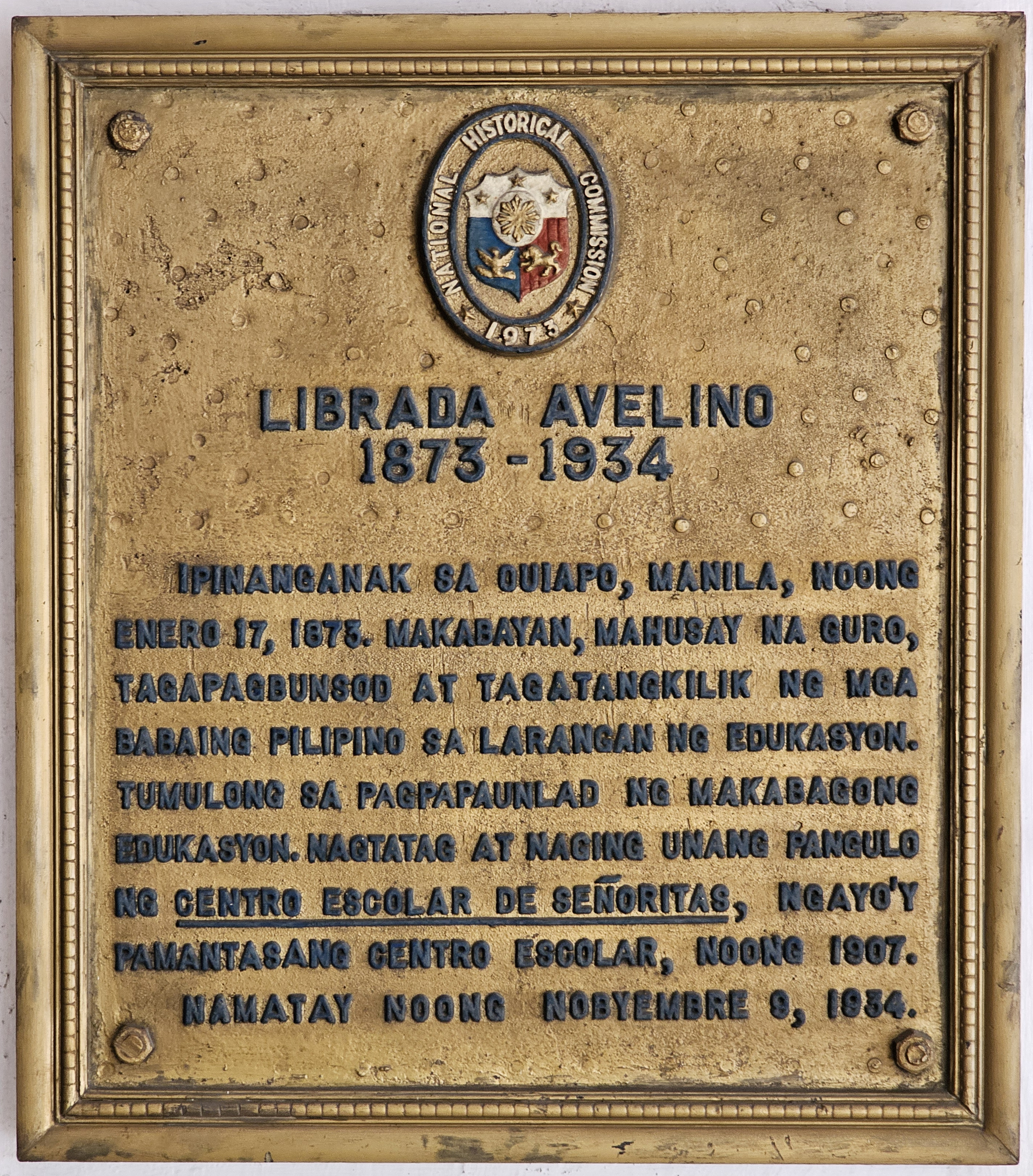
Historical marker by the National Historical Institute

Avelino died from stomach cancer at the home of a friend who lived on Alhambra Street in Ermita, Manila, on November 9, 1934. She was buried in Campo Santo de La Loma, in Caloocan. Between its founding in 1907 and her death, the Centro Escolar University graduated 20,000 students and its capital increased from the initial investment of ₱750 to over ₱1,000,000 at the time of her death. It named an award which honors Asian women leaders after Avelino. The university became co-educational in 1945 and has continued to expand, offering a wide range of courses on numerous campuses. In 2005, President Gloria Macapagal proclaimed the country's Centennial of the Feminist Movement and Avelino was honored with the Champion of the Feminist Movement Award.

There are memorials throughout the country which honor Avelino: a street in Pandacan bears her name, as does an elementary school in Tondo; and an auditorium and statue at the Centro Escolar University. There is also a plaza in Manila named after her. Originally the space known as the Rotonda de Sampaloc housed the Carriedo Fountain and contained a roundabout. After urbanization in the 1960s and 1970s, it became the junction point of Jose Laurel Street, Lacson Avenue, Legarda Street, and Magsaysay Boulevard and is known better as the Rotonda or Nagtahan Interchange, though the police station known as the Plaza Avelino Outpost retains the official name of the plaza.

In March 2026, Philippine Daily Inquirer enlisted her as one of "the Filipina 'firsts' [who] rarely appear in textbooks, but their contributions helped change the course of history and widened opportunities for women" alongside Ignacia del Espíritu Santo, Luisa Gonzaga de León, Martha de San Bernardo, Asunción Ventura, Pura Villanueva Kalaw, Consuelo Padilla Osorio and Honorata de la Rama.
