= Martha de San Bernardo =

Martha de San Bernardo, P.C.C., was a 17th-century Colettine Poor Clare who was first Filipino woman to become a Roman Catholic nun; she served in Macau.

== Biography ==
While her birth name is lost, it is recorded that she was a ladina (a Spanish-speaking native of the Philippines with no Spanish ancestry) who belonged to an affluent and influential family from Pampanga on the island of Luzon, then part of the Spanish East Indies. Inspired by the lives of the Colettine Clares who had arrived from Spain in 1621 under the leadership of Mother Jerónima de la Asunción, P.C.C., and established the Royal Monastery of Santa Clara in Intramuros, she wished to become a nun herself. In this, she was able to secure the support of the monastic community. Due, however, to the colonial regulations of the Spanish Empire which ruled the islands and the existing racial prejudices of the period, she was barred from admission.

Instead, in 1633, with the assistance of the Minister General of the Franciscans, she was sent to a newly opened monastery in the Portuguese colony of Macau. Together with several Spanish postulants, she was formally received into the Colettine Order on board a ship sailing the South China Sea, at which time she was given the religious name by which she is now known.

The precise details of Mother De San Bernardo's death are unrecorded. The Colettines officially give the years 1639–40, saying that she died in Macau while on mission.

=== Recognition ===
In March 2026, Philippine Daily Inquirer enlisted her as one of "the Filipina 'firsts' [who] rarely appear in textbooks, but their contributions helped change the course of history and widened opportunities for women" alongside Ignacia del Espíritu Santo, Luisa Gonzaga de León, Librada Avelino, Asunción Ventura, Pura Villanueva Kalaw, Consuelo Padilla Osorio and Honorata de la Rama.

== See also ==
- San Lorenzo Ruiz, the first Filipino to be canonised
- San Pedro Calungsod, the second Filipino to be canonised
- Ignacia del Espiritu Santo
- Religious of the Virgin Mary
