= Ignacia del Espíritu Santo =

Filipina nun and Venerable (1663–1748)

Venerable Ignacia del Espíritu Santo RVM
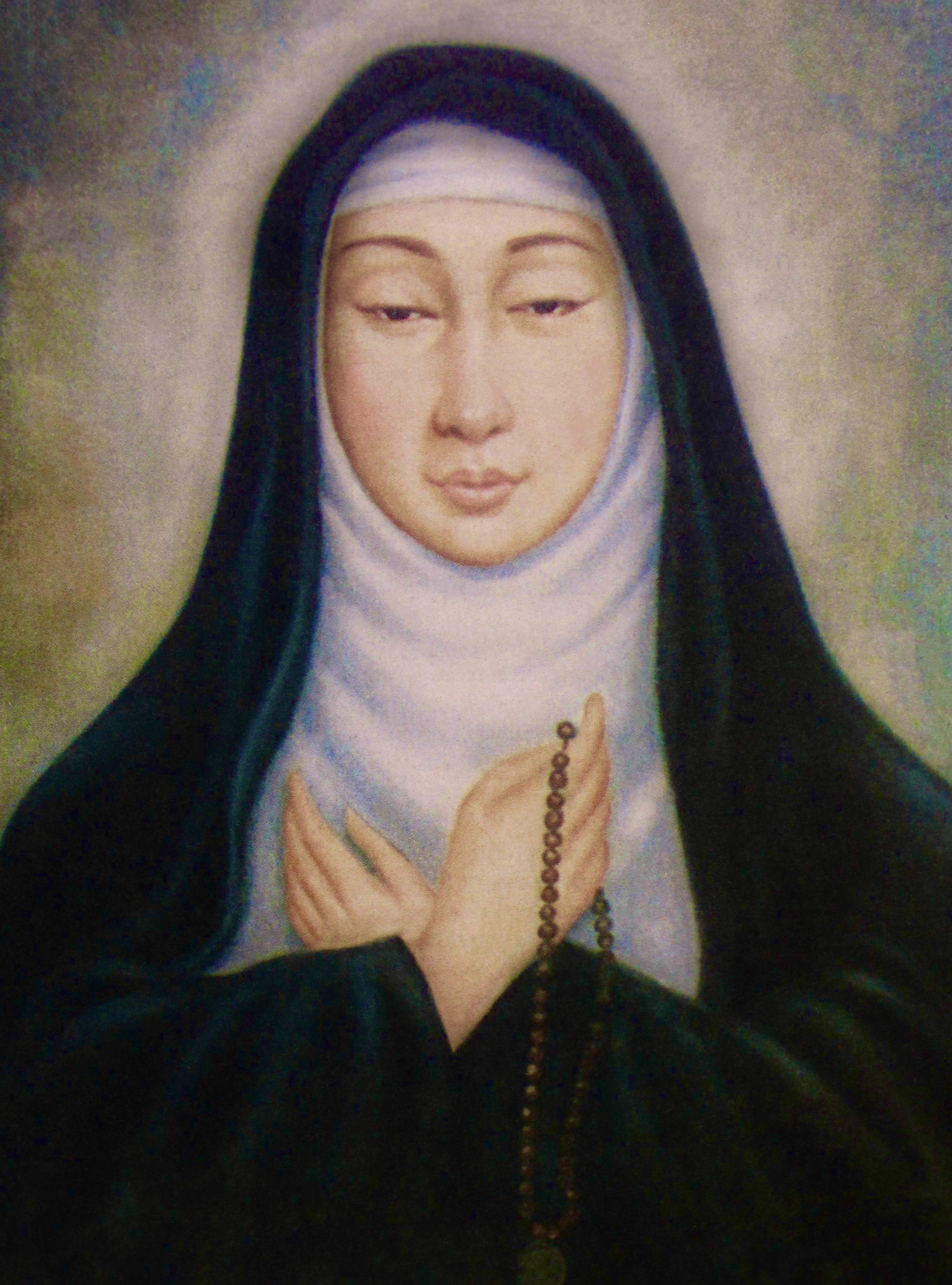
- Born: February 1, 1663; Binondo, Manila, Captaincy General of the Philippines
- Died: September 10, 1748 (aged 85); Intramuros, Manila, Captaincy General of the Philippines

Ignacia del Espíritu Santo, also known as "Mother Ignacia" (February 1, 1663 – September 10, 1748) was a Filipino religious sister of the Catholic Church. She was known for her acts of piety and religious poverty and founded the Congregation of the Sisters of the Religious of the Virgin Mary, the first congregation for native Filipino women with approved pontifical status on the Philippines.

Ignacia del Espíritu Santo was declared venerable by Pope Benedict XVI on July 6, 2007.

== Early life ==
Ignacia was the eldest and sole surviving child of María Jerónima, a Filipina, and José Yuco, a Christian Chinese migrant from Xiamen, China. Her birthdate is piously believed to have been February 1, 1663; cultural customs since the Spanish Era had parents assign children names matching the Sanctoral cycle, which had Ignatius of Antioch on 1 February until the promulgation of the General Roman Calendar of 1969. Only her baptismal record is preserved, which occurred on March 4, 1663. Ignacia was christened in the long-gone Church of the Holy Kings in the fifth Parián de Chinos by Fray Padre Alberto Collares, OP.

Expected by her parents to marry at 21 years old, Ignacia sought religious counsel from Padre Pablo Clain, a Jesuit priest from the Kingdom of Bohemia (present-day Czech Republic). The priest directed her through the Spiritual Exercises of Ignatius of Loyola, from which Ignacia drew her apostolic devotion and piety. After this period of solitude and prayer, Ignacia decided to pursue her religious calling, to "remain in the service of the Divine Majesty” and “live by the sweat of her brow.” According to Father Murillo Velarde, her eyewitness biographer, Ignacia left her parents' home with only a needle and a pair of scissors.

== Religious seclusion ==
At that time, there were only two religious houses for women in the Philippines: the Beaterio de Santo Domingo and Santa Clara Monastery, both of which limited admission to those of pure Spanish ancestry. Ignacia felt strongly against the Spanish colonial ban on native Filipinos from entering priestly or religious life. The Spanish abbess Mother Jerónima de la Asunción opened the Santa Clara Monastery in 1621, but Filipinas could not be admitted. In hopes of changing this racially structured ecclesiastical limitation, Ignacia began to live alone in a vacant house at the back of the Colegio Jesuita de Manila, the Jesuit headquarters. Under the spiritual guidance of Jesuit Father Pablo Clain, she led a life of public prayer and labor which attracted other Filipina laywomen to live with her. She accepted them into her company and, though they were not yet an officially recognized religious institute, the group became known as the Beatas de la Virgen María (English: "Religious of the Virgin Mary"), living at the Beatería de la Compañía de Jesús (English: "Convent of the Society of Jesus"). For their conventual chapel, they used the San Ignacio Church (destroyed in the Second World War) and Jesuit priests were their spiritual directors.

Established in 1684, they were the first Filipino religious congregation for women. Folklore describes their penitential form of spirituality and mortification of the flesh which sustained them in hardship, especially during times of extreme poverty when they had to beg for rice and salt and scour Manila's streets for firewood. The Beatas supported themselves through manual labor and the alms received, and only admitted young girls and boarders whom they gave catechism and manual work. Eventually, their growing number called for a more stable lifestyle and a set of rules or religious constitutions to govern their daily schedule.

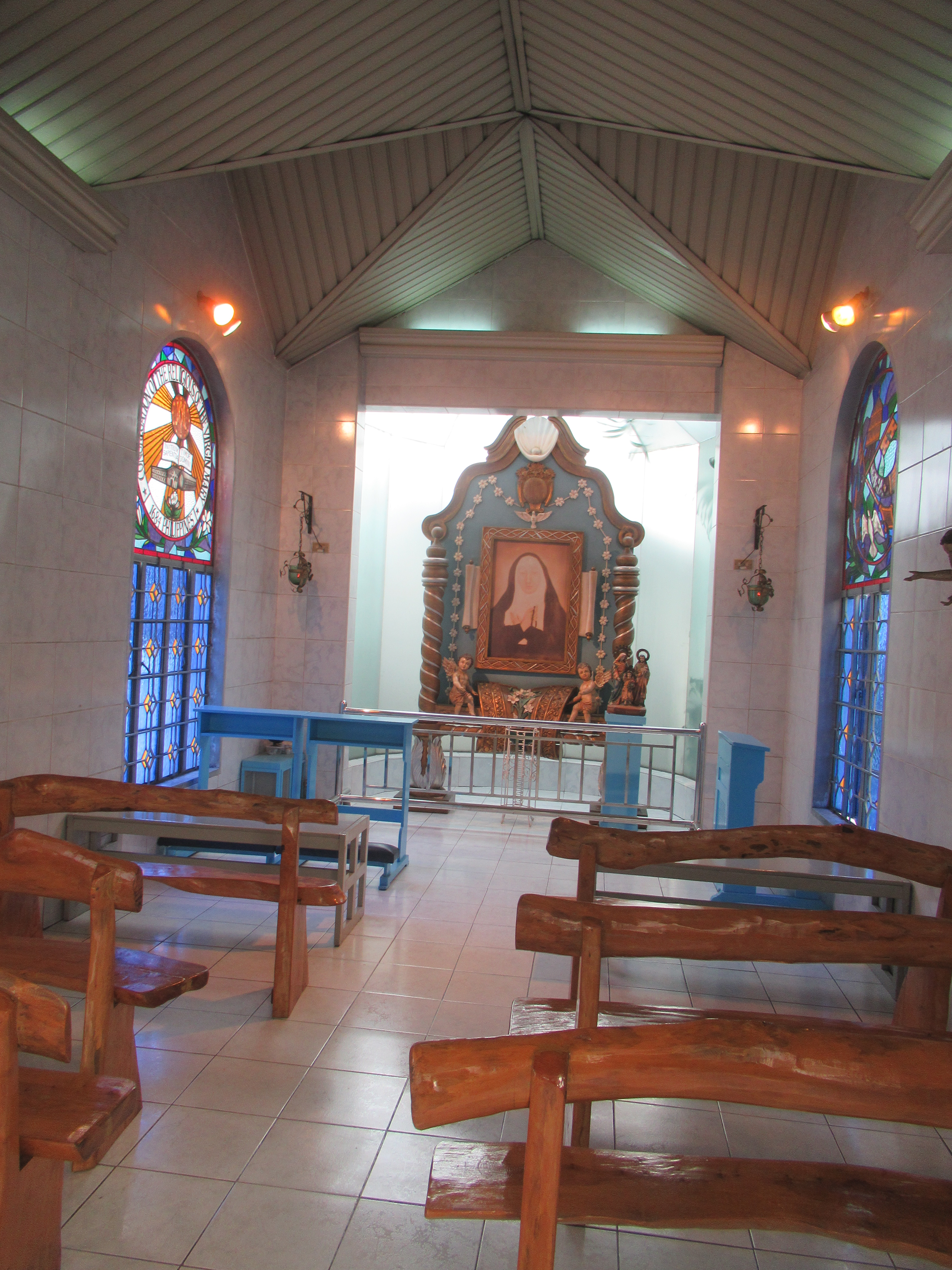
Memorial (Saint Mary's College of Quezon City)

== Constitution of the congregation ==
In 1726, some 42 years after she adopted religious life, Ignacia wrote a set of rules for her religious group, finalized constitutions for a congregation, and submitted this to the Archdiocesan Chancery Office of Manila for ecclesiastical approbation. The Fiscal Provisor of Manila formally granted these in 1732, along with the rules in use among other religious women. Ignacia, then 69 years old, resigned as mother superior of her congregation, and lived as an ordinary member until her death aged 85 on September 10, 1748. She died after receiving Holy Communion at the altar rail of San Ignacio Church in Intramuros.

After her death in 1748, Archbishop of Manila Reverend Pedro de la Santísima Trinidad Martínez de Arizala, OFM, paid homage to the growing religious group she left behind:

They live in community with great edification to the whole city and contributing to the common good. They are clothed in blackcotton tunic and mantle. They attend daily Mass at the Jesuit church where they also frequent the sacraments.... They do not observe cloister and they support themselves partly through the work of their hands and partly by the charity of pious people.

In May 1768, the Royal Decree of King Charles III of Spain suppressing of the Jesuits had reached Manila. It was later implemented with the approval of Pope Clement XIV, and was a blow to Ignacia's group as the Jesuit priests ministering to them were expelled from the Philippines and deported to Spain and Italy.

== Pontifical approval ==
On July 31, 1906, the Archbishop of Manila, Jeremiah James Harty, assisted the religious sisters in the canonical erection of the congregation founded by Ignacia del Espíritu Santo. The erection had been postponed in filing in 1732 due to an incorrect process of petition to Rome. On March 17, 1907, Pope Pius X promulgated the Decretum Laudis ("Decree of Praise") in favour of the congregation's rules and constitutions. The decree of approbation was granted by Pope Pius XI on March 24, 1931, which made it a congregation of Pontifical right. On September 10, 1948, Pope Pius XII issued the decree of definitive papal approbation of the constitutions.

== Beatification process ==
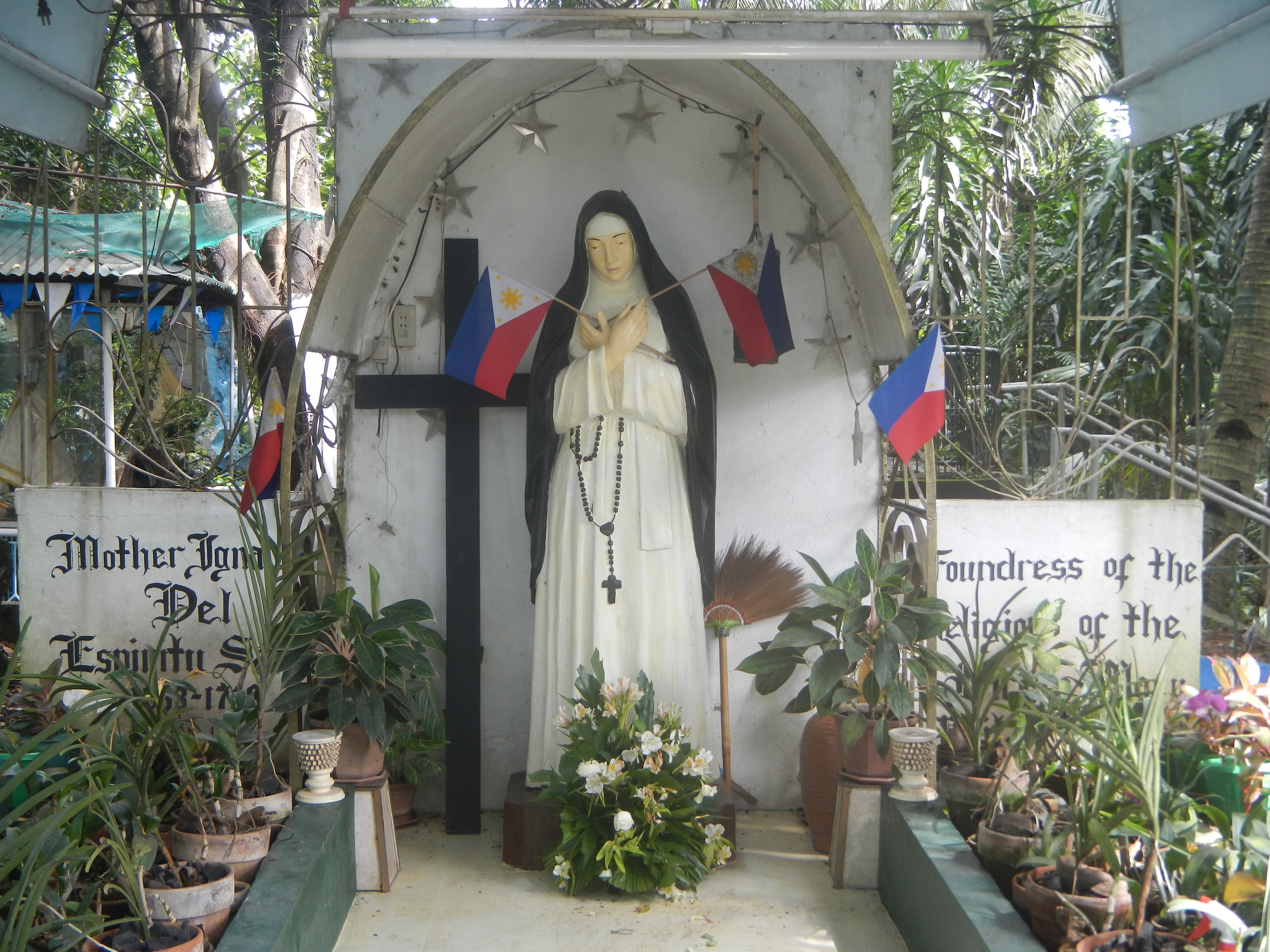
Statue at Ignacia Healing Center, Caloocan

In a papal decree dated July 6, 2007, Pope Benedict XVI accepted the findings of the prefect of the Congregation for the Causes of Saints and declared that

... the Servant of God Ignacia, foundress of the Religious of the Blessed Virgin Mary, is found to possess to a heroic degree the theological virtues of Faith, Hope and Charity toward God and neighbor, as well as the cardinal virtues of Prudence, Justice, Temperance, and Fortitude.

On February 1, 2008, the Archbishop of Manila, Gaudencio Rosales presided over the promulgation which accorded Ignacia the title venerable at the Minor Basilica of San Lorenzo Ruiz in Binondo, Manila. On March 25, 2026, Bishop of Kalookan Cardinal Pablo Virgilio David presided over the Mass relaunching Ignacia’s beatification process.

== Legacy ==
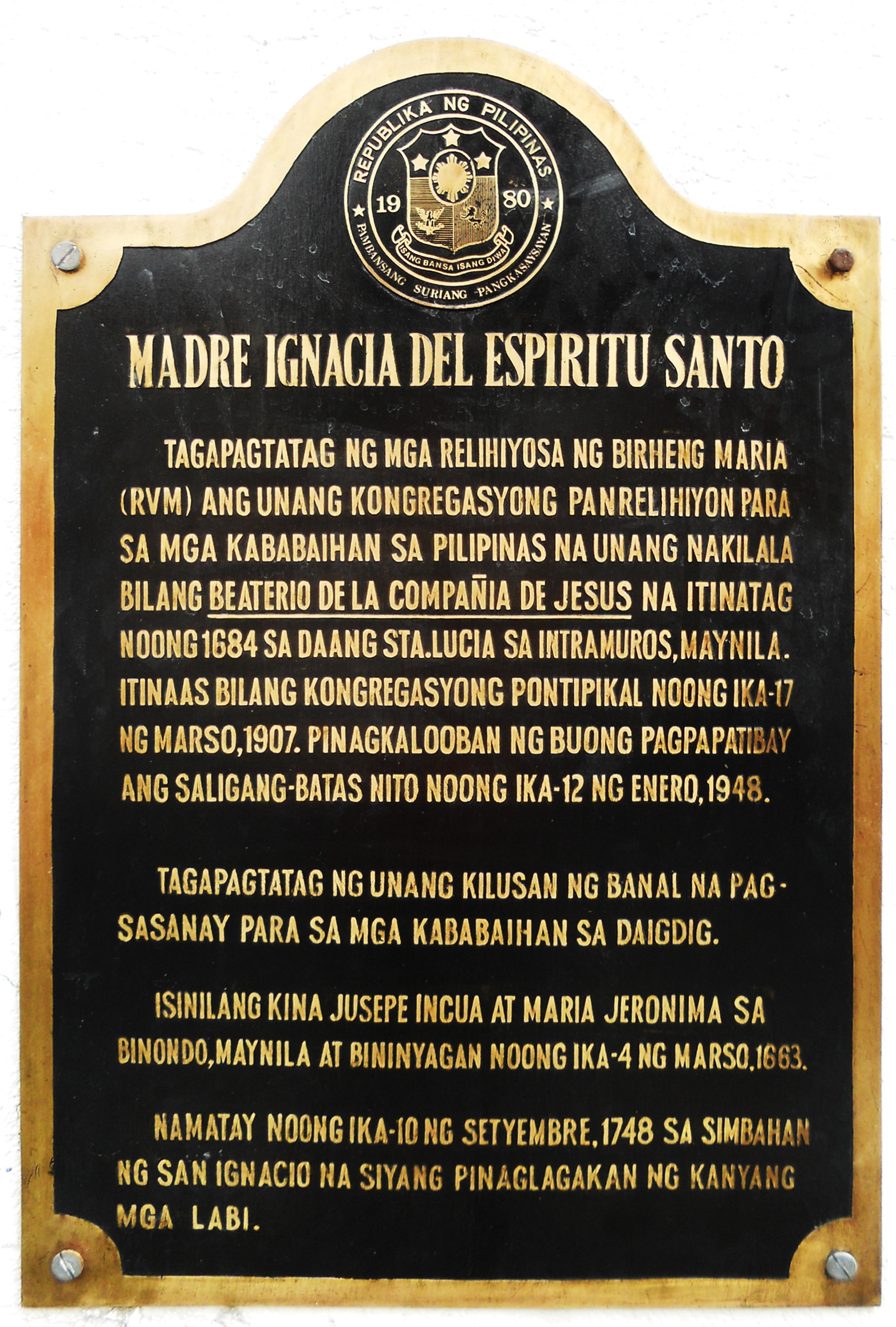
Historical marker installed by the National Historical Commission of the Philippines in Intramuros, Manila to commemorate Mother Ignacia

Mother Ignacia Avenue in the Diliman district of Quezon City is named after Ignacia del Espíritu Santo and is the address of St. Mary's College, Quezon City, a private school belonging to the Religious of the Virgin Mary. The avenue is also the location of the ELJ Communications Center that serves as the headquarters of ABS-CBN Corporation, a Philippine media company owned by the Lopez Holdings Corporation, which consists of the company's namesake media network ABS-CBN and other owned channels, subsidiaries, and divisions. The municipality of Santa Ignacia in Tarlac is also named in honor of Ignacia del Espíritu Santo.

In March 2026, Philippine Daily Inquirer enlisted her as one of "the Filipina 'firsts' [who] rarely appear in textbooks, but their contributions helped change the course of history and widened opportunities for women" alongside Luisa Gonzaga de León, Martha de San Bernardo, Librada Avelino, Asunción Ventura, Pura Villanueva Kalaw, Consuelo Padilla Osorio and Honorata de la Rama.
