= Consuelo Padilla Osorio =

Filipino film director

- Born: September 1, 1907
- Died: January 1987 (aged 79)
- Other names: Ateng; Consuelo Ruiz
- Occupation: Film director
- Spouse: Salvador Osorio
- Children: 10
- Father: José Padilla Sr.
- Family: José Padilla Jr., Roy Padilla Sr., Amado Cortez

Consuelo "Ateng" Ruiz Padilla-Osorio (September 1, 1907 – January 1987) was an early female film director and screenwriter of Tagalog language films in the Philippines.

In March 2026, Philippine Daily Inquirer enlisted her as one of "the Filipina 'firsts' [who] rarely appear in textbooks, but their contributions helped change the course of history and widened opportunities for women" alongside Ignacia del Espíritu Santo, Luisa Gonzaga de León, Martha de San Bernardo, Librada Avelino, Asunción Ventura, Pura Villanueva Kalaw and Honorata de la Rama.

== Early life and education ==
Consuelo Padilla-Osorio was born on September 1, 1907, the eldest daughter of actor and politician José Padilla Sr. and Clarita Ruiz. Her nine siblings included actors and boxers Jose "Pempe" Padilla Jr. and Carlos Padilla Sr. She was educated at Saint Theresa's College. a Catholic school operated by Belgian nuns. Upon graduation, she eloped with Salvador Osorio, a lawyer. They went on to have ten children, including actor Bebong Osorio.

== Career ==
She published short stories in the magazine Liwayway and the textbook Pampanitikan. Under the name Consuelo Ruiz she began a career as a screenwriter and director. She wrote the screenplay for the Gerardo de León film Bahay Kubo (1938), a musical starring Fely Vallejo, Rogelio de la Rosa, and Fleur de Lis. She wrote and directed Dalagang Luksa (1939), where her own sister, Maria Clara Ruiz, played the title role of a woman who falls for a married man. Consuelo and Salvador Osorio collaborated as directors and screenwriters on a number of films: Dolores (1939), starring Norma Blancaflor and her brother Jose Padilla Jr., Hindi Ko Akalain (1939), Tanikala ng Langit (1940), and Pagsuyo (1941). She also acted alongside her brother Jose in Asahar at Kabaong (Bridal Garland and Casket), 1937.

During the Japanese occupation of the Philippines, they were forced to live in a rice field in Plaridel, Bulacan. Salvador Osorio died due to an illness, leaving Consuelo Osorio to care for their children alone after World War II. She was forced to leave her children in a convent while she restarted her film career.

She directed a number of films for Premiere Productions, many of which were hits at the box office, starting with Bakya Mo Neneg (1947) starring Rosa del Rosario and Leopoldo Salcedo. For Premiere, she also directed Halik sa Bandila (1948), a war film, Bagong Sinderella (1947), Pangarap Ko’y Ikaw Rin (1947), Bulalaka (1948), Maliit Lamang ang Daigdig (1948), Anak ng Panday (1949), Magkapilas na Langit (1949), Hiwaga ng Tulay na Bato (1950), Gulong ng Palad (1950), based on a popular radio soap opera, and Labis na Pagtitipid (1951).

Two of her hits from the 1960s were Bang-Shang-A-Lang (1968) and Drakulita (1969). Bang-Shang-A-Lang was a musical importing the American hit song "Bang-Shang-A-Lang" by The Archies and starring Filipinos teen idols like Helen Gamboa, Ronaldo Valdez, Tirso Cruz III. Drakulita (1969) was a film about a vampire scare and used slapstick humor to highlight social issues, including having a trans woman played by German Moreno cope with her homophobic stepfather. Two of her 1960s screenplays were nominated for Best Screenplay by the Filipino Academy of Movie Arts and Sciences: Kung Ako’y Mahal Mo (1960), co-written with Joseph de Cordova, and Kami’y Kaawaan (1963).

== Death ==
Consuelo Padilla Osorio died in 1987 of pernicious anemia.

== Filmography ==
- Asahar at Kabaong ("Bridal Garland and Casket", 1937)
- Bahay Kubo (1938)
- Dalagang Luksa ("Lady in Mourning", 1939)
- Dolores (1939)
- Hindi Ko Akalain (1939)
- Tanikala ng Langit (1940)
- Pagsuyo ("Courtship", 1941)
- Bakya Mo Neneg ("Your Wooden Clogs, Neneng", 1947)
- Bagong Sinderella ("Modern Cinderella", 1947)
- Pangarap Ko’y Ikaw Rin ("I Dream of You", 1947)
- Halik sa Bandila ("A Kiss to the Flag", 1948)
- Bulalaka ("Shooting Star", 1948)
- Maliit Lamang ang Daigdig ("The World Is a Small Place", 1948 )
- Anak ng Panday ("Son of the Blacksmith," 1949)
- Magkapilas na Langit (1949)
- Hiwaga ng Tulay na Bato ("Mystery of the Stone Bridge," 1950)
- Gulong ng Palad (1950)
- Labis na Pagtitipid (1951)
- Kung Ako’y Mahal Mo (If You Love Me), 1960
- Kami’y Kaawaan (Have Mercy on Us), 1963
- Bang-Shang-A-Lang (1968)
- Drakulita (1969)
