= MSU-IIT Octava Choral Society =

Filipino university choral group

- Choir
- The official choir logo (2022).
- Also known as: 8va
- Origin: Iligan City, Philippines
- Founded: 1978
- Founder: Francisco A. Englis, MA
- Genre: Choral music
- Choirmaster: Ernesto C. Zaldua Jr. (since 2016)
- Headquarters: College of Arts and Social Sciences, MSU-IIT
- Affiliation: Mindanao State University–Iligan Institute of Technology

The MSU-IIT Octava Choral Society, also known as 8va Choral Society, is the resident choral group of the Mindanao State University–Iligan Institute of Technology. The group has performed in local and international events, ranging in genres such as folk, Filipino ballads, classical, ethnic, and contemporary music.

== History and career ==
=== 1978–1987: Beginnings ===
In 1978, Francisco A. Englis and a number of faculty, staff, and college students of MSU-Iligan Institute of Technology, organized a choir which they called the 8va Choral Society. The following year, the group already gave public performances around Iligan City, as well as giving lecture-demos to schools in an attempt to educate students on choral singing and to inculcate them with the requisites of music.

In 1981, the group competed in the National Music Competitions for Young Artists college choir category and won first prize. As the college choir champion that year, the group, which was renamed the MSU-IIT Octava Choral Society upon the suggestion of Professor Andrea O. Veneracion of the Philippine Madrigal Singers, became the Philippine representative to the 3rd International Choral Festival held in Manila in 1983.

=== 1988–2016: Hiatus and subsequent revival, tours, and competitions ===
In 1988, the group suspended its activities. Prof. Englis utilized the time completing his research requirement for his graduate studies at Kent State University in Ohio. After a six-year hiatus, Prof. Englis revived the group with the assistance of its former pianist, Hope Serate. With the group's record of excellence, MSU-IIT officially recognized Octava as the institute resident choral group. Subsequently, the group conducted concerts in the Visayas and Mindanao regions.

On 21 July 2006, the group was chosen by the National Commission for Culture and the Arts as the Philippine representative to the 27th World Conference and Music Festival of the International Society for Music Education held at Kuala Lumpur, Malaysia. The following day, Octava conducted a concert at Yayasan Sabah Auditorium in Kota Kinabalu as a culmination of the choir's participation in the said conference. On 23 August 2008, the group competed and won in Verbena de Coros: 1st Xavier Choral Festival. Prof. Englis was also awarded the Fr. Antonio Cuna, SJ Award for Best Conductor in the same competition. In 2009, Octava competed in the 1st CCP National Choral Competition held at the Cultural Center of the Philippines. The group received one gold certificate and two silver certificates in three categories. In 2012, the group was invited to perform at the Claire Isabel McGill Luce Auditorium in Silliman University, marking the said university's 50th cultural season. In August 2015, Octava conducted a two-day concert in selected schools in Lanao del Norte as a grantee of the Cultural Center of the Philippines' Outreach Local Tour Grants Program.

=== 2016–present: New management ===
In 2016, Prof. Englis retired from teaching in MSU-IIT and passed the baton to Engr. Ernesto Zaldua Jr. Under the new management, the group finished as a semi-finalist in the National Music Competitions for Young Artists adult choir category held at the University of the Immaculate Conception in Davao City in 2017. On 18 February 2023, the group placed third in Musikahan sa Tagum Choral Competition and was also awarded a Plaque of Excellence in Music. Later that year, Octava competed and qualified as a finalist in the regional semi-finals of the National Music Competitions for Young Artists senior choir category held at Bukidnon State University Auditorium in Malaybalay City. The group competed in the national leg of the said competition on 24 November 2023 at the Manila Metropolitan Theater and was awarded as an honorable mention. Subsequently, Octava, together with Prof. Englis and Engr. Zaldua, was awarded the Garbo Performing Arts Award by the Department of Trade and Industry Region X for its contributions to the performing arts and representing the region on both national and international stages.

== Awards and recognitions ==
=== Competitive distinctions ===
Year	Competition	Awards received	Ref.
1980	National Music Competitions for Young Artists	College Choir Category – First Prize, Regional Semi-finals; College Choir Category – Fourth Place, National Finals	
1981	National Music Competitions for Young Artists	College Choir Category – First Prize, Regional Semi-finals; College Choir Category – First Prize, National Finals	
2008	Verbena de Coros: 1st Xavier Choral Festival	Grand Prize Winner (Gran Premio); People's Choice Award (Premio Publico); Fr. Antonio Cuna, SJ Award for Best Conductor - Prof. Francisco A. Englis	
2009	1st CCP National Choral Competition	Folk Music Category – Third Prize, Gold Awardee; Mixed Choir Category – Silver Awardee; Sacred Music Category – Silver Awardee	
2009	MBC National Choral Competition	Collegiate Choir Category – Finalist	
2015	MBC National Choral Competition	1st Runner-Up, Regional Semi-finals	
2017	National Music Competitions for Young Artists	Adult Choir Category – Semi-Finalist, Mindanao Cluster	
2019	Huni sa Pasko: Sangka sa Daygon	First Runner-Up	
2023	Musikahan sa Tagum: Himig Handog Choral Competition	Third Place; Plaque of Excellence in Music	
2023	National Music Competitions for Young Artists	Senior Choir Category – Semi-Final Qualifier, Northern Mindanao Cluster; Senior Choir Category – Honorable Mention, National Finals	
2024	Sr. San Miguel Choral Festival	Grand Prize Winner	
2025	6th Andrea O. Veneracion International Choral Festival	Folk Song & Indigenous Music Category – Gold Diploma; Musica Sacra Category – Gold Diploma; Mixed Choir Category – Silver Diploma	
2025	National Music Competitions for Young Artists	Senior Choir Category – Semi-Final Qualifier, Mindanao Cluster; Senior Choir Category – Third Prize, National Finals	

=== Non-competitive distinctions ===
Year	Event	Awards received	Ref.
2023	Garbo Iligan/Lanao del Norte Creatives Event and Exhibit — Department of Trade and Industry Region X	Garbo Performing Arts Award	

== Discography ==
=== Albums ===
- Octava Choral Society Live at CCP (c. 1980-1981)
- The Octava Choral Society: Viva! Señor San Miguel (Ug Uban Pa) (2006)
- Rasa Sayang: The Octava Choral Society LIVE! in Kota Kinabalu, Malaysia (2006)

== Notable members ==
- Marlou Flores – multi-medalist, World Championships of Performing Arts
- Nathan Kim Mosot – multi-medalist, World Championships of Performing Arts
