= Religious of the Virgin Mary =

Catholic community based in the Philippines

Congregation of the Religious of the Virgin Mary
- Religiosas de la Beata Virgen María
- Abbreviation: RVM
- Established: 1684; 342 years ago
- Type: Centralized Religious Institute of Consecrated Life of Pontifical Right for women
- Headquarters: Motherhouse; 214 N. Domingo St., Brgy. Kaunlaran, Cubao, Quezon City Philippines
- Coordinates: 14°37′01″N 121°02′30″E
- Members: 702 members as of 2020
- Motto: Latin: Ad Jesum Cum Maria; English: To Jesus with Mary
- Foundress: Venerable Mother Ignacia del Espíritu Santo Iuco, RVM
- Superior General: Very Rev. Mother Maria Rosabella R. Gallo, R.V.M.
Countries served
• Canada • Ghana • Indonesia • Italy	• Pakistan • Philippines • Sweden. Taiwan • USA
- Parent organization: Catholic Church
- Website: RVM
- Remarks: Works include primary through tertiary education, spiritual retreats, direct service to the poor, and assistance at hospitals and various diocesan and parish works.
- Formerly called: Beaterio de la Compania de Jesus

The Congregation of the Religious of the Virgin Mary (Spanish: Religiosas de la Beata Virgen María, abbreviated RVM, is a Catholic centralized religious institute of consecrated life of Pontifical Right for women founded in Manila in 1684 by the Filipina Venerable Mother Ignacia del Espíritu Santo.

In 2016 there were over 700 RVM sisters, mainly from the Philippines. They run a university and 58 other schools and have works in seven countries outside the Philippines. From the start they cultivated an apostolic, Ignatian spirituality and have retreat houses along with their other diverse works.

== History ==
The Congregation of the Religious of the Virgin Mary, the oldest and largest Filipina Catholic religious congregation, was the first all-Filipina religious congregation for women in the Philippines, founded in 1684 by Ignacia del Espíritu Santo.

A congregation of a mixed life, it aims at personal sanctification and perfection mainly through offering Catholic education to youth and catechetical instruction in parishes, along with offering spiritual retreats for lay women, running dormitories, and caring for the sick in hospitals.

=== Spanish era ===
Ignacia del Espíritu Santo began her work in 1684, after discerning her vocation in a retreat administered by her spiritual director, the Czech Jesuit priest Pablo Clain (also known as Paul Klein). At the age of twenty-one she left home and launched an uncertain effort to found a group of religious sisters who worked outside cloister, which was quite rare in those days. She began with her niece Cristina Gonzales and two young girls, Teodora de Jesús and Ana Margarita, joining her. This was the nucleus of the Beatas de la Compania de Jesús, which subsequently became the Congregation of the Religious of the Virgin Mary (RVM). They were popularly called beatas ("saintly") but this evolved into Sor ("sister") or Madre ("mother").

The house where the beatas lived was called House of Retreat because they also offered retreats and days of recollection for women. Ignacia's generosity and common sense-approach to things drew others to the congregation. In 1732, Archbishop of Manila Juan Ángel Rodríguez approved the policies and rules of the community and Mother Ignacia, now 69, resigned from her leadership role. By 1748 the group numbered fifty. They ran a school for forty-five girls – Filipinas, Spaniards, and mestizas – imparting lessons in Christian living along with training in reading, sewing, and embroidery. In July 1748 the Archbishop of Manila Pedro de la Santísima Trinidad Martínez de Arizala formally petitioned King Ferdinand VI of Spain for protección civil for the Congregation. Ignacia died two months later on 10 September 1748, at the age of 85. On 25 November 1755 the King granted to the congregation civil protection.

=== Expansion ===
From 1748 to 1770 the beatas assisted the Jesuit Fathers in conducting spiritual retreats, and extended their work to provinces in Luzon in groups of two or more as circumstances permitted, reanimating the faith of those who had fallen away from the sacraments.

The period between 1872 and 1900 saw the establishment of the first missions in the largely Muslim Mindanao, which was then two or three months away by sea. In the account from the Misión de la Compania de Jesús by Pablo Pastells, the beatas were referred to for the first time as Sisters when they set sail for Tamontaca in Cotabato in 1874. Some Muslims were hostile to the nuns and burnt the mission orphanage, with one of the Sisters mortally wounded when an assailant ran amok. In spite of the dangers the Sisters established themselves in other Jesuit mission towns. The Dapitan mission opened in 1880, Dipolog in 1892, Zamboanga in 1894, and Surigao together with Lubungan and Butuan in 1896.

While the Philippine Revolution of 1896 and the Spanish–American War caused deprivations for the Sisters in Mindanao, they were able to care for the wounded in hospitals, and when peace was restored, opened new schools in Luzon and in the Visayas.

=== American period and World War II ===
On 21 June 1902, the apostolic administrator of the Archdiocese of Manila, Martin García Alocer, approved the congregation's petition to convene members from the different mission stations for the purpose of electing a mother general. In the same year, María Efigenia Álvarez of Ermita, Manila, was elected the first mother general in a general chapter. On 17 March 1907 Pope Pius X promulgated the Decree of Praise in favor of the congregation's rules and constitutions. The Decree of Approbation was granted by Pope Pius XI on 24 March 1931. This decree elevated the congregation to pontifical status.

With Efigenia as mother general in 1902, an era of expansion and progress began. She encouraged the sisters to pursue higher studies at the University of Santo Tomas in Manila to better prepare them for teaching. During her administration ten houses, schools, and dormitories were founded, along with others that were later closed. In 1938, Efigenia, at the age of eighty and five times elected to office, received permission from the Holy See to resign. On 10 July 1938 María Andrea Montejo was appointed by the Holy See to succeed her in governing the twenty-six houses the congregation had throughout the country. On 1 October 1939, with support from local church authorities, the congregation received leave from the Holy See to transfer its novitiate from Parañaque, Rizal (now Parañaque) to its present site at Quezon City.

=== Post-Independence ===
The Philippines regained full sovereignty from the United States on 4 July 1946, with the establishment of the Third Philippine Republic. Almost two years later on 12 January 1948 (the 200th anniversary of the death of the foundress) Pope Pius XII issued the Decree of Definitive Pontifical Approbation of the Constitutions, placing the congregation directly under Rome. Pedro Vidal, Consultor for the Society of Jesus in the Sacred Congregation of Religious, represented the Congregation of the Religious of the Virgin Mary at the signing of the decree in 1948. Archbishop of Zamboanga Luís del Rosario, SJ then serving as Apostolic Visitator of the congregation, played a vital role in the process which led to the granting of the final decree.

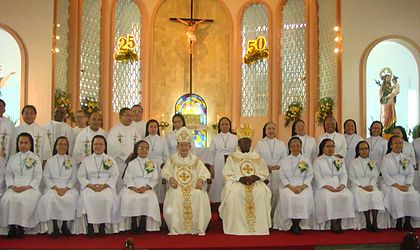

The post-war years saw expansion to the whole of the Philippine archipelago. In 1948 they opened a college on their school campus in Davao City, which has grown into the University of the Immaculate Conception. In 1963 the congregation numbered 483 professed Sisters, 40 novices, and 9 postulants.

The golden jubilee of the Religious of the Virgin Mary in the United States was celebrated in the Cathedral of the Blessed Sacrament in Sacramento, California, on 18 July 2009. The Philippines jubilee celebration that year was held at Our Lady of the Assumption Chapel with Gabriel Villaruz Reyes, Bishop of Antipolo, presiding.

== Present day ==
By 2016 there were more than 700 RVM sisters worldwide and they ran 58 schools including one in Islamabad, Pakistan, and four in Ghana, West Africa. While involved mostly in education, they also had ten retreat houses, fifteen dormitories, and an outreach at times of catastrophes and to those in dire need. The sisters were also involved in an array of special ministries in service to dioceses, campus ministries, hospitals, and others. Their foreign presence included the United States, Canada, Indonesia, Ghana, Italy, Taiwan, Sweden and Pakistan. In addition to convents in Italy, the sisters also minister to senior citizens with Alzheimer's disease in Taiwan.

=== Mother Ignacia's status ===
In 2007, Pope Benedict XVI declared the foundress, Ignacia del Espiritu Santo, a Venerable of the Catholic Church:

The servant of God, Ignacia del Espiritu Santo, Foundress of the Congregation of the Religious of the Virgin Mary, is found to possess in heroic degree the theological virtues of faith, hope and charity toward God and neighbor, as well as the cardinal virtues of prudence, justice, temperance and fortitude.

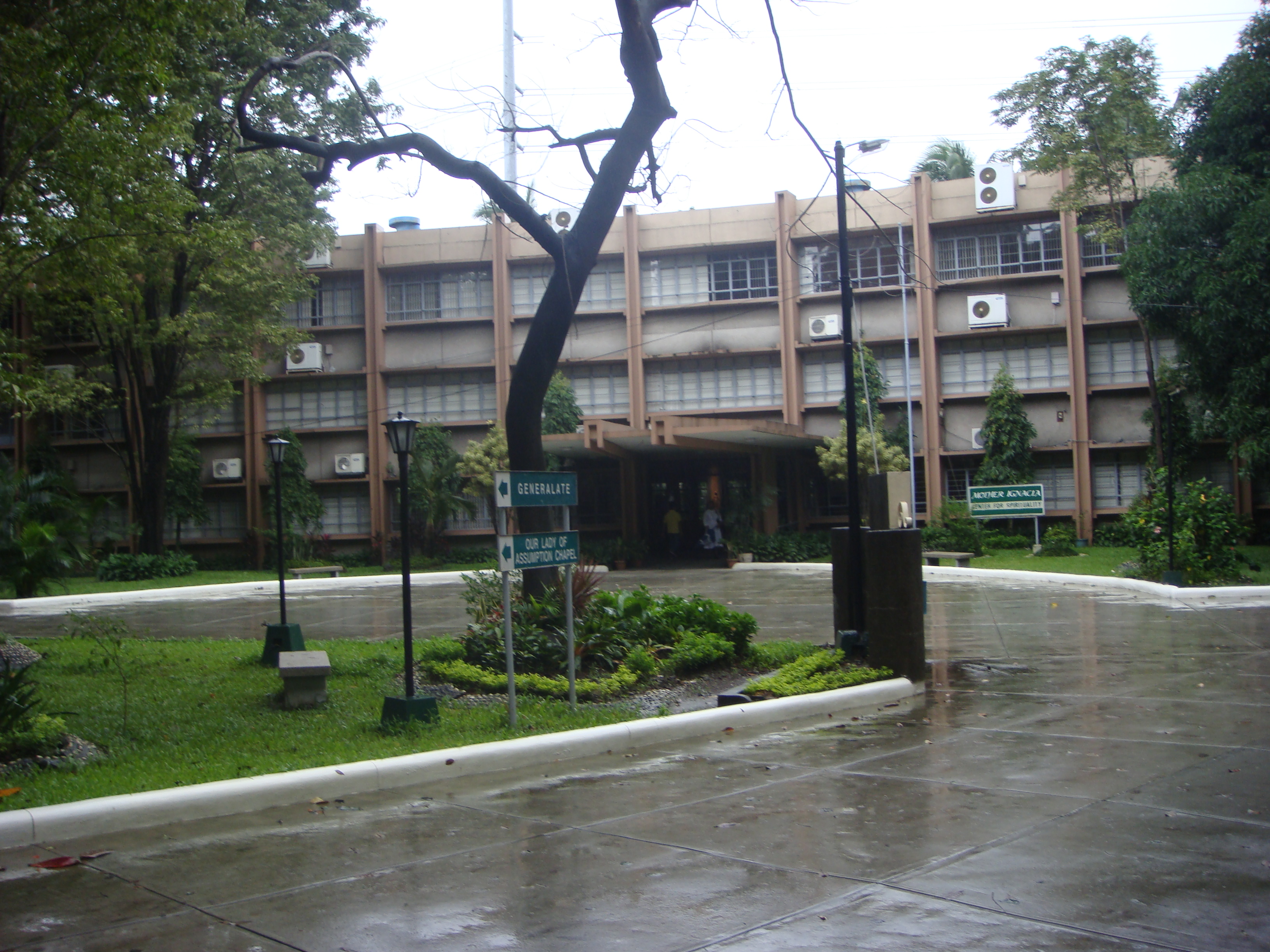
Mother Ignacia Center for Spirituality

== RVM motherhouse ==
The RVM congregation, previously called the Beaterio de la Compañia de Jesus, was originally based in Intramuros. In 1935, the Historical Research and Markers Committee installed a historical marker for the beaterio.

The beaterio was damaged during the World War II, which led for the congregation to move to another location The Bagumbayan Light and Sound Museum now stands on the site.

The current motherhouse is in Quezon City is a successor to the first motherhouse in Intramuros, which had existed since the foundation of the congregation in 1684 up to its destruction along with nine other houses of the congregation and much of Manila during the Liberation in 1945. For some time during and after the war, the motherhouse was situated on Espania Street, Manila. In 1950, it was transferred to Quezon City in a compound of over five hectares which, besides the motherhouse, has the chapel of Our Lady of the Assumption blessed and inaugurated in 1950, St. Mary's novitiate, juniorate, and infirmary, and near the front gate the three-storey Betania Retreat House and Luzon Regional Residence. Sisters return to the motherhouse for togetherness, and for their annual 8-day retreat.

== RVM seal ==

The official seal of the congregation is characteristically Marian, drawn from the image of the Woman of the Apocalypse. Encircled by rays which represent her far-reaching zeal and charity, the central device is the A and M monogram representing the words Auspice Maria ("under the guidance of Mary", also "Ave Maria"). Surrounding the Auspice Maria are twelve stars for the twelve privileges of Mary, the Mother of God, through which people receive her maternal blessings. Rays emanate from the starry monogram in seven groups, representing the graces that come from Jesus with Mary and signifying the congregation's motto, "To Jesus with Mary".

Under the monogram is an open book bearing the Latin inscription of an excerpt from the book of Pslams, Initium sapientiae timor domini, which translates to "The fear of the Lord is the beginning of wisdom". Immediately below the open book is the angular façade of the original, pre-war Beaterio in Intramuros. Its massive solidity stands for the strength and spirit of unity which typified the moving force which led Ignacia del Espiritu Santo, foundress of the congregation, to found the first Filipina congregation of women in the Philippines.

Below the Beaterio is a sprig of sampaguita (J. sambac), which has been the national flower of the Philippines since 1934. It stands for the Filipina origin and character of the Congregation, as well as its mission of serving the country and compatriots overseas.

== Gallery ==
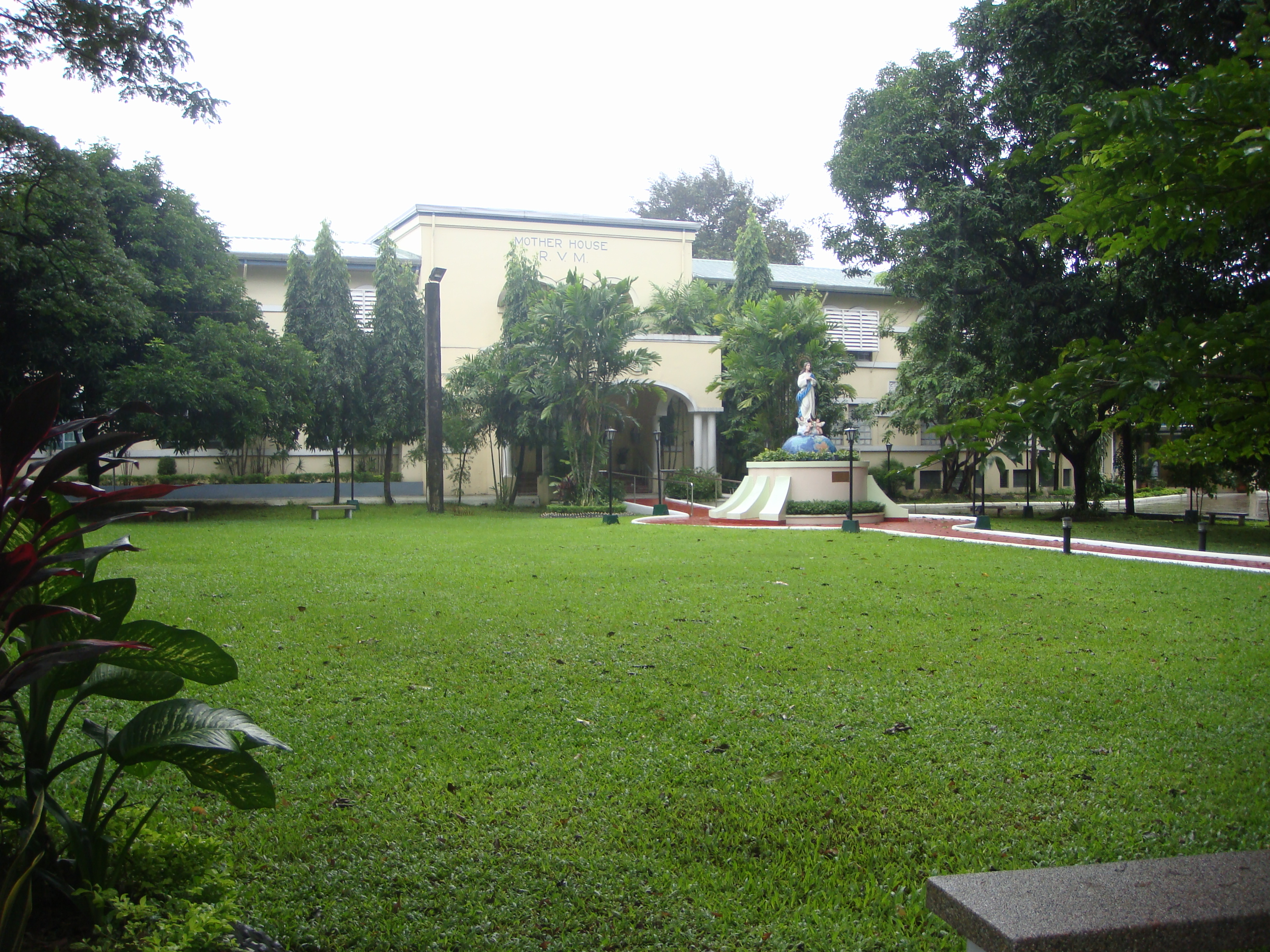
RVM Motherhouse & Generalate, 214 N. Domingo, 1111 Quezon City

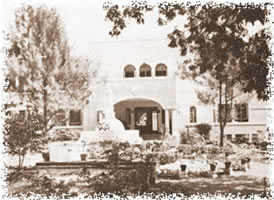
Motherhouse, Quezon City

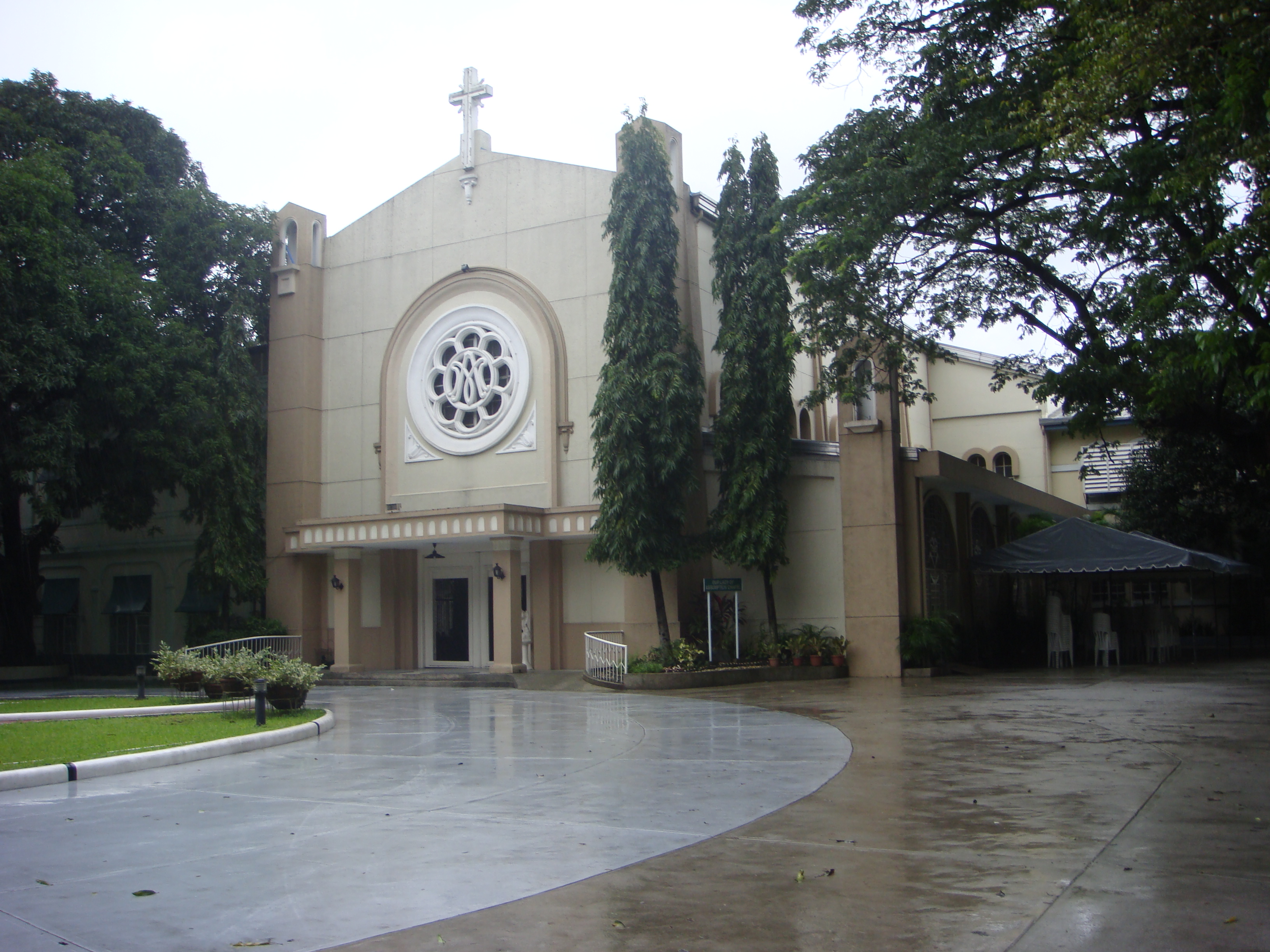
Our Lady of the Assumption Chapel, RVM Motherhouse

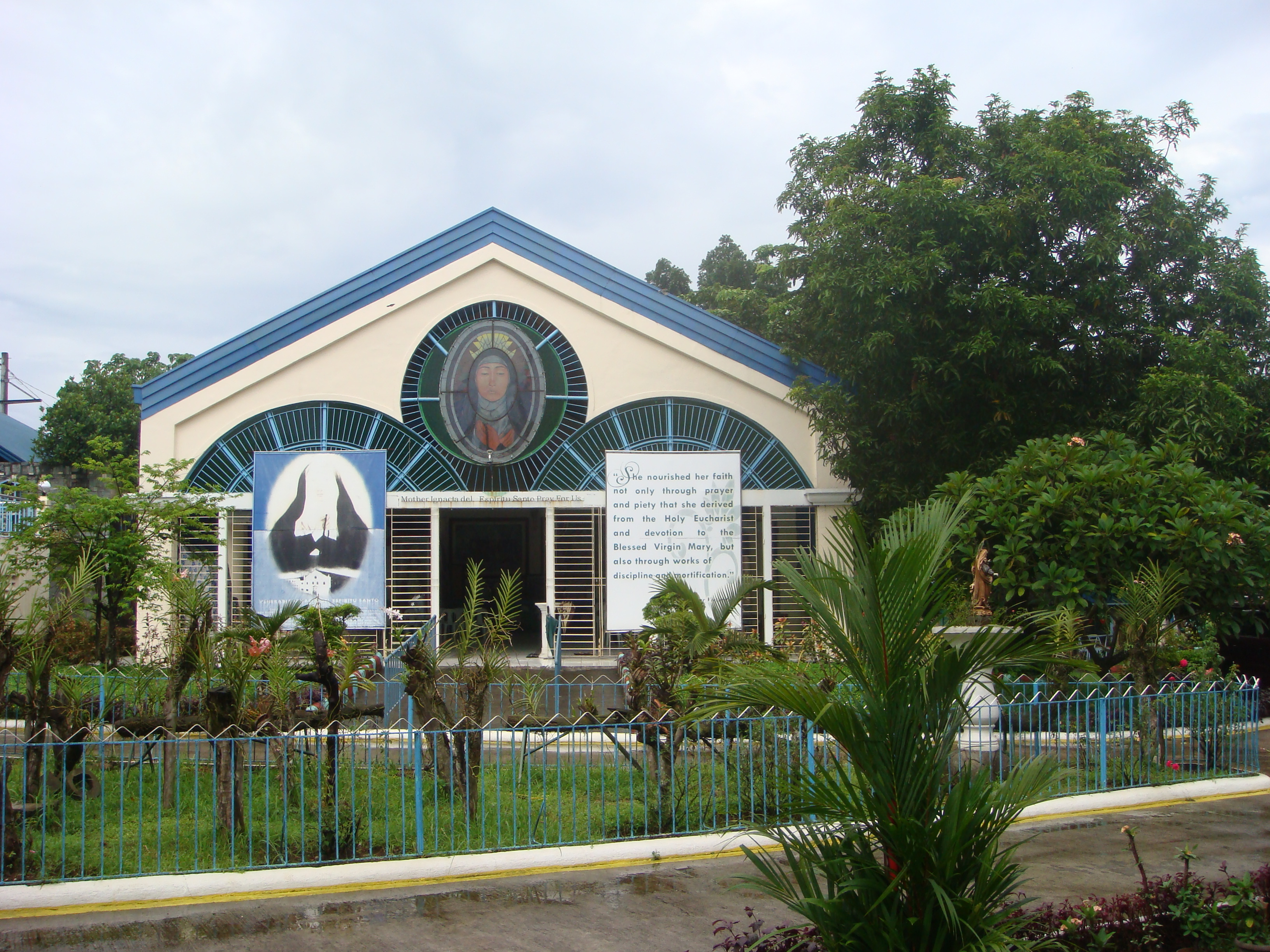
Mother Ignacia Healing Center of the RVM, Bagombong, Caloocan

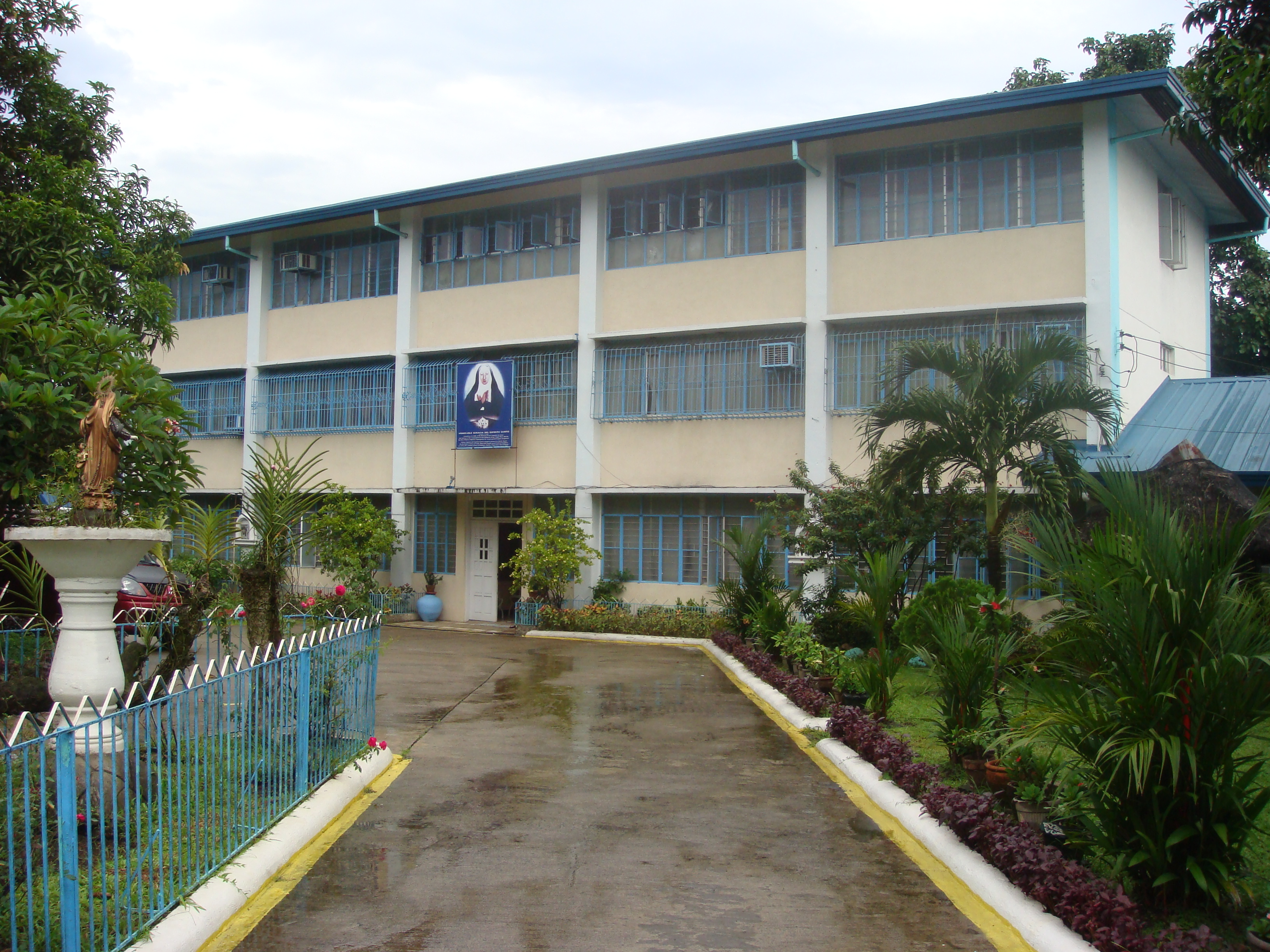
The center is named after the RVM founder Ignacia del Espiritu Santo

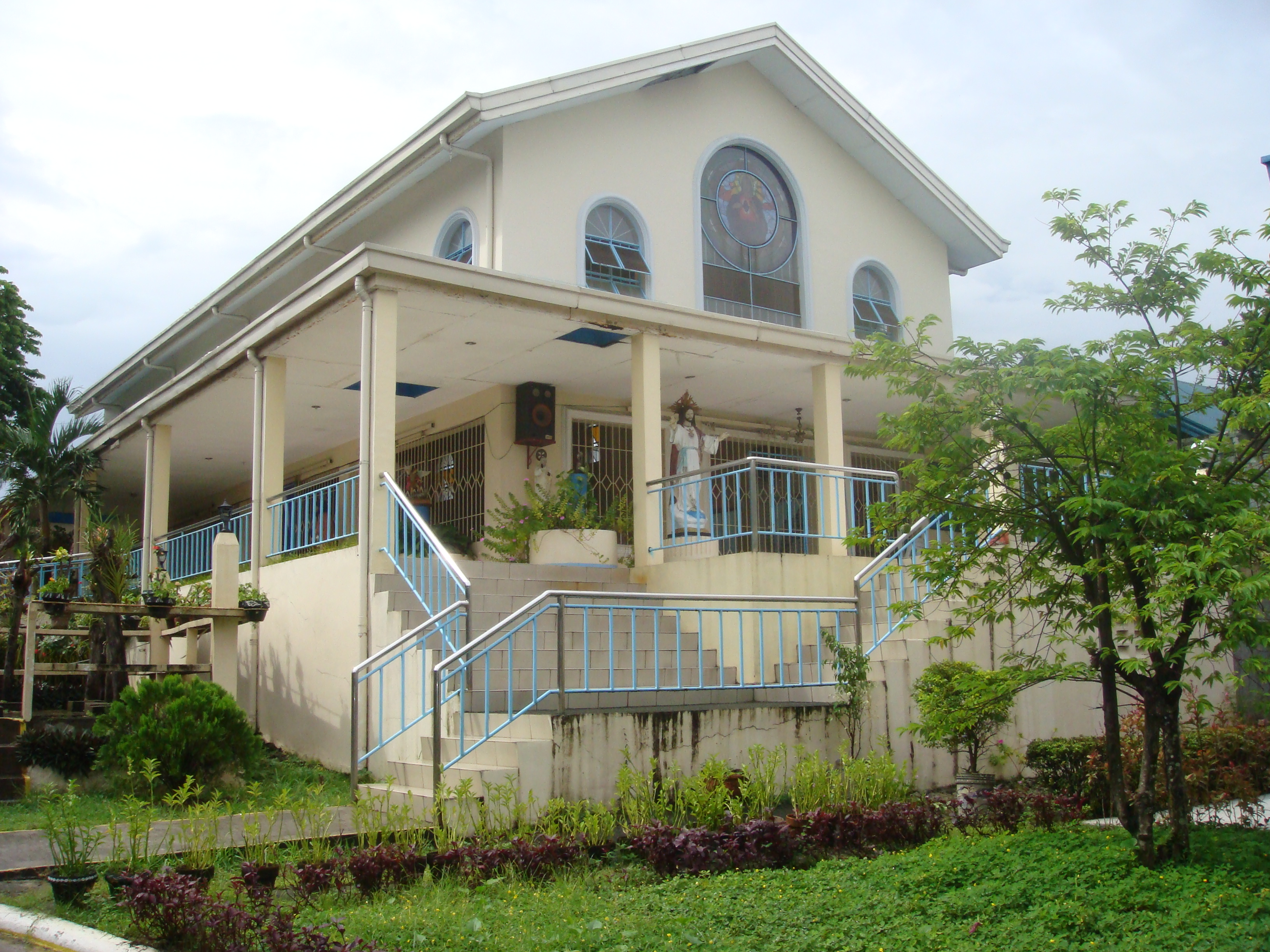
The center's Adoracion Chapel

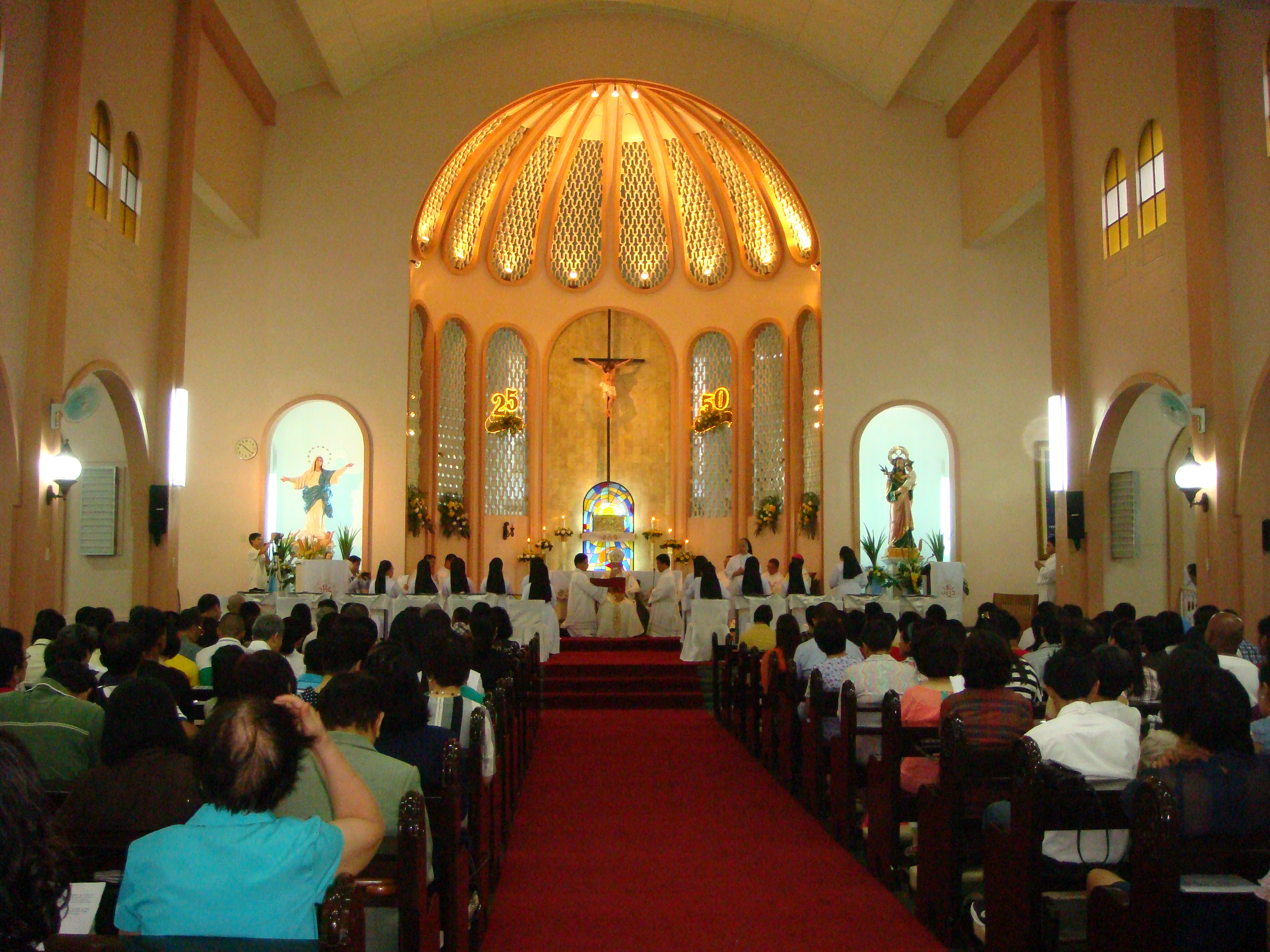
Interior of Our Lady of the Assumption Chapel

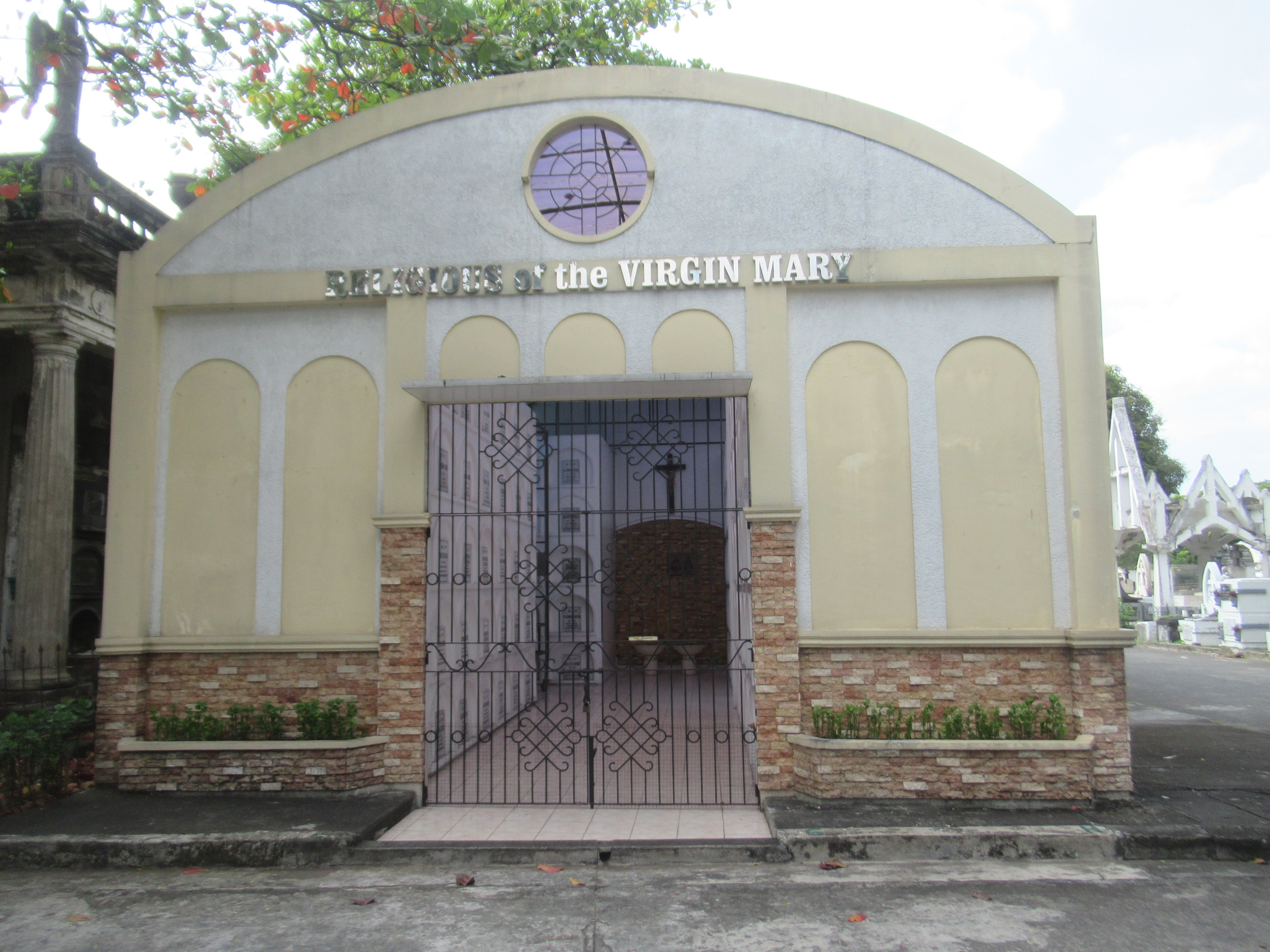
RVM mausoleum at La Loma Cemetery

== See also ==
- Chapel of San Lorenzo Ruiz, New York
- Pontificio Collegio Filippino
- Jerónima de la Asunción
- Three Fertility Saints of Obando, Bulacan, Philippines
- The First Filipina Nun
- Colegio de San Pascual Baylon
