= Paul Klein (missionary) =

Czech Jesuit missionary, 1652–1717

- Born: Pavel Klein; 25 January 1652; Cheb, Kingdom of Bohemia
- Died: 30 August 1717 (aged 65); Manila, Captaincy General of the Philippines, Spanish Empire
- Other names: Pablo Clain, Paulus Klein
- Occupations: Missionary, pharmacist

Paul Klein (25 January 1652 – 30 August 1717), also called Pablo Clain (Latin: Paulus Klein, Czech: Pavel Klein), was a Czech Jesuit missionary, pharmacist, botanist, author of an astronomic observation and writer. He was the rector of Colegio de Cavite as well as the rector of Colegio de San Jose and later Jesuit provincial superior in the Philippines, the highest ranking Jesuit official in the country. Klein is known as an important personality of life during the 18th-century Manila.

Klein is known for writing a standardized Tagalog dictionary as well as the first person to describe Palau for the Europeans and to draw the first map of Palau,. He wrote the first astronomic observation from Manila of a lunar eclipse and an overview of medicinal plants in local as well as European languages as well as recipes for their usage.

== Life ==
Klein was born in Cheb, Kingdom of Bohemia (now the Czech Republic) on 25 January 1652. He entered the Society of Jesus in 1669 and applied for travel to the colonies in 1678. Klein traveled to the Philippines alongside the fourth Jesuit mission dispatched from Bohemia in 1678, which consisted mostly of doctors and pharmacists through Genoa, Spain and Mexico, arriving to the Philippines in 1682.

Klein first became a pharmacist. Pharmacy in those days was closely connected to the use of herbs and botanizing. Klein thus became the first person to describe native Philippine medicinal plants, using their names in several languages including Tagalog, Visayan and Kapampangan when he published his renowned Remedios fáciles para diferentes enfermedades... in 1712.

Klein was a respected educator, a professor at the Jesuit college, and later the rector of Colegio de Cavite and Colegio de San Jose. He published several religious texts. He played an important role in the establishment of the Religious of the Virgin Mary in 1684 in Manila as the spiritual director of the congregation's founder. He is regarded by the said congregation as their second founder.

In 1686 Klein described the lunar eclipse in Manila (published in Mémoires de l'Académie des Sciences, vol. 7, Paris). During the years of 1708–1712, Klein reached to the highest Jesuit position, becoming the provincial superior of the Jesuit order in the Philippines. He died on 30 August 1717 in Manila.

== Languages and Tagalog dictionary ==
Klein's main language and the language of several of his letters sent back home to Bohemia was Czech. Besides Czech, Klein also spoke Latin (which was the main language of his correspondence), Spanish, German and later he learned the Philippine languages of Tagalog, Cebuano and Kapampangan.

Klein became the author of the first substantial Tagalog dictionary, later passing it over to Francisco Jansens and José Hernandez. Further compilation of his substantial work was prepared by P. Juan de Noceda and P. Pedro de Sanlucar and published as Vocabulario de la lengua tagala in Manila in 1754 and then repeatedly reedited with the last edition being in 2013 in Manila.

== Discovery of Palau ==
In 1696 a group of natives were stranded on the northern coast of the Philippine island of Samar. Paul Klein was able to meet them on 28 December 1696 and to send a letter in June 1697 to the Jesuit superior general, in which he described this encounter and included the first ever map of Palau sketched from a set of 87 pebbles arranged by the islanders, representing the approximate map. Klein's letter reappears again and again in later documents. It is considered a key map, giving strong stimulus to a new missionary endeavour from the Philippine Jesuits. The first ships were sent to the islands in 1700, 1708 and 1709 but sunk, the first boat finally arriving to Palau in 1710.

== Works ==
Because of his previous studies of pharmacy, Klein described medicinal plants of the Philippines and collected their names in the languages of Latin, Spanish, Tagalog, Visayan and Kapampangan as well as their use in medicine. Probably the best known are his recipes of medicines made of local herbs and ingredients published in 1712. In comparison to the vast pharmaceutical, medical and scientific work done by his compatriot Georg Joseph Kamel, which stirred interest in Europe, Klein's latter work was mainly focused on curing Filipinos while using local languages. Many of his formulations are still commonly used today.

Besides his botanical and pharmaceutical work, Klein also authored many religious publications, published in Manila in Spanish and in Tagalog.

- Remedios fáciles para differentes enfermedades apuntados por el Padre Pablo Clain de la Companía de Jesús para el alivio y socorro de los Ministros evangélicos de las doctrinas de los naturales..., Universidad de Santo Tomás de Aquino, Manila 1712, 2nd edition, Madrid 1852;
- Pensamientos christianos: sa macatovid manga paninisisdimin nang tavong christiano sa arao halagang sangbovon, 1748
- Beneficios, y favores singulares hechos por el glorioso archangel san Rafael al santo patriarca Tobias, y su familia, 1754
- Vocabulario de la lengua tagala, Manila - dictionary of the main Philippine language; edited in 1754 in Manila, with final compilation prepared by Juan de Noceda and Pedro de Sanlucar.
