= University of the Immaculate Conception =

Roman Catholic university in Davao City, Philippines

- Pamantasang Imaculada Conception (Filipino)
- Former names: Escuela Catolica de San Pedro (1905-1934); Immaculate Conception Academy (1934-1938); Immaculate Conception Institute (1938-1948); Immaculate Conception College (1948-1992)
- Motto: Initium Sapientiae Timor Domini (Latin)
- Motto in English: The fear of the Lord is the Beginning of Wisdom.
- Type: Private Roman Catholic non-profit coeducational basic and higher education institution
- Established: 1905; 121 years ago
- Founder: Congregation of the Religious of the Virgin Mary
- Religious affiliation: Roman Catholic (Religious of the Virgin Mary)
- Academic affiliations: PAASCU AUN UMAP ASEACCU
- President: Sister Maria Marissa R. Viri, RVM
- Students: 7,000 - 10,000 (estimate)
- Location: Father Selga Street, Davao City, Davao del Sur, Philippines; 7°4′11″N 125°36′00″E
- Campus: Bankerohan Campus Father Selga St., Barangay 5-A, Poblacion District, Davao City Bonifacio Campus Bonifacio St., Barangay 35-D, Poblacion District, Davao City Bajada Campus Dumanlas Road, Buhangin Proper, Buhangin District, Davao City
- Colors: Pink and White
- Mascot: Phoenix
- Website: www.uic.edu.ph
- Location in Mindanao Location in the Philippines

The University of the Immaculate Conception (Filipino: Pamantasang Imaculada Conception), also referred to by its acronym UIC, is a private Catholic basic and higher education institution administered by the Religious of the Virgin Mary in Davao City, Davao del Sur, Philippines. The university began in 1905 as Escuela Catolica de San Pedro.

== History ==
=== Early years until World War II ===
The university began in 1905 as Escuela Catolica de San Pedro along Bonifacio Street in downtown Davao City with only primary and intermediate courses. Then in 1934, when the high school department opened, the school was renamed Immaculate Conception Academy. After four years, during its first commencement exercise, however, it was again renamed Immaculate Conception Institute. The school closed during World War II, from 1941 to 1946.

=== Post-war period ===
After the war, the school reopened in 1947 when it received government recognition as a high school. A year later, the school became Immaculate Conception College (ICC) as it started to offer college-level courses. The two initial courses were Collegiate Secretarial and Pharmacy.

Between 1951 and 1958, four Bachelor of Science degree were introduced, namely: Education, Home Economics, Music, and Elementary Education. In 1961, the Liberal Arts Program was added along with majors in commerce and medical technology.

In 1969, the Grade School and High School Departments were moved to ICC’s new site at Fr. Selga St., while the College Department followed in 1971. Three more undergraduate majors were then added: namely, chemistry, nutrition & dietetics and a course on pharmacy aiding.

From 1983 to 1986, master's degrees in theology and elementary education were introduced. The first engineering degree of the college, civil engineering, was also instituted during this time. A course on cafeteria management was also offered. In the 1990s, in response to the local needs in Davao, ICC added more engineering-focused majors in computer engineering, electronics engineering, and computer science.

The graduate school was chosen by Fund Assistance for Private Education (FAPE) to be a training center in chemistry, physics, and engineering. More master of Arts degree courses were added in educational management, values education, teaching college physics, teaching college chemistry, and engineering education.

On May 1, 1992, Department of Education Secretary Dr. Isidro Carino granted ICC university status, and it became “University of the Immaculate Conception”. The school was then 87 years old.

=== 2000 onwards ===
Since 2000, additional graduate programs in pharmacy, information technology, and information management have been instituted. The university also opened new undergraduate degrees in information technology and information management. The university also launched an e-learning program – a web-based learning system serving all departments and sections of the university. Along with this, the Information Technology Research Zone (ITRZ), a computing facility, was built.

== Colleges ==
1. College of Accounting and Business Education
2. College of Arts and Humanities
3. College of Computer Studies
4. College of Engineering and Architecture
5. College of Human Environmental Sciences and Food Studies
6. College of Medical and Biological Sciences
7. College of Music
8. College of Nursing
9. College of Pharmacy and Chemistry
10. College of Teacher Education

== Campus ==
The UIC has three separate campuses: the Fr. Selga (Main) campus, Bonifacio (Annex) campus and Bajada (basic education) campus.

The Fr. Selga campus along Pichon Street houses the departments of information technology, nursing, medical technology, music, nutrition & dietetics, pharmacy, and the Graduate School. Called the Main campus, it was built in the 1960s to house the college's growing population.

The school's original location in downtown Davao along San Pedro Street is within the San Pedro Church compound. The Annex campus in Bonifacio Street houses the Business and Governance, Engineering, Education, and Liberal Arts colleges.

Lastly, the Bajada campus houses the grade school and high school facilities of the university.

A library can be found on the Fr. Selga campus. The said campus also includes housing and sports facilities.

== Student life ==
There are more than 10,000 students in the entire UIC. There exists a student government body called the University Student Government of UIC, which represents the student's interests to the school administration.
