= Luisa Gonzaga de León =

Filipina writer and translator

- Born: June 21, 1805; Bacolor, Pampanga, Captaincy General of the Philippines
- Died: 1843 (aged 37–38)
- Occupations: Author, translator
- Spouse: Francisco Paula de los Santos
- Writing career
- Genre: Spiritual
- Notable work: Ejercicio Cotidiano (Daily Devotion)

Luisa Gonzaga de León (June 21, 1805 – 1843) was one of the first Filipinas to become a writer and a translator. She is most known for compiling and translating the Ejercicio Cotidiano, which is a collection of Catholic prayers translated into Kapampangan, the native language of Pampanga in central Luzon. This translation from Spanish and Tagalog was groundbreaking as it made Catholic prayers and the Liturgy available to the local population in their native language, over a century before the Second Vatican Council.

With the posthumous publication of Ejercicio Cotidiano in 1844, de León became both the first published native Filipina author and the first Kapampangan writer to be published.. Furthermore, she was the first individual to translate the Roman Missal into a vernacular language of the Philippines.

In March 2026, the Philippine Daily Inquirer featured her as one of "the Filipina 'firsts' [who] rarely appear in textbooks, but their contributions helped change the course of history and widened opportunities for women," alongside Ignacia del Espíritu Santo, Martha de San Bernardo, Librada Avelino, Asunción Ventura, Pura Villanueva Kalaw, Consuelo Padilla Osorio, and Honorata "Atang" de la Rama..

== Early life and education ==
Luisa Gonzaga de León was born on June 21, 1805 in Barrio Cabangbangan, Bacolor, Pampanga. She was born on the feast of Saint Aloysius Gonzaga. She was the daughter of Jose Leonardo de León and Casimira Custodia, who were both from notable families in Manila. Luisa’s father’s grandfather, Francisco Tico was a Chinese entrepreneur. Her mother’s family and father’s grandmother were both native.

In 1803, her father was appointed as the official notary of Pampanga by the governor general. He was officially approved by King Carlos IV on July 5, 1803. They moved to Bacolor.

Before Luisa was born, her parents had a son named Jose Aniceto. Luisa was assumed to have attended a religious school in Manila. She would have learned Spanish, reading, writing, math and religion. Her uncle and godfather, Dr. Pedro León de Arzega was the first Filipino layman to obtain a doctorate in any field."

== Personal life ==
de León married Don Francisco Paula de los Santos who was another Chinese mestizo. She was about 15 years old. A year after marriage, her husband took a leadership role in Bacolor, becoming the governor of the Pampanga province. They had three sons. The first son was Celestino Mariano who was born on July 18, 1822. He became the governor of his father's hometown Porac. The second son was Jose Maria born on March 19, 1825 who became the governor of Bacolor. Their last son Francisco died in infancy. The family moved to Porac during the time between Celestino's birth and Jose's birth.

Around 1840, Luisa’s husband (Francisco) died and consequently Luisa fell ill. As mentioned in the preface of Ejercicio Cotidiano, she wrote this piece while under house arrest. She was suffering from tuberculosis and thus, was forbidden to attend Mass in her final days. wrote the book during a period of confinement. Being afflicted with tuberculosis, she was prohibited from attending mass during the last days of her life.

== Ejercicio Cotidiano ==
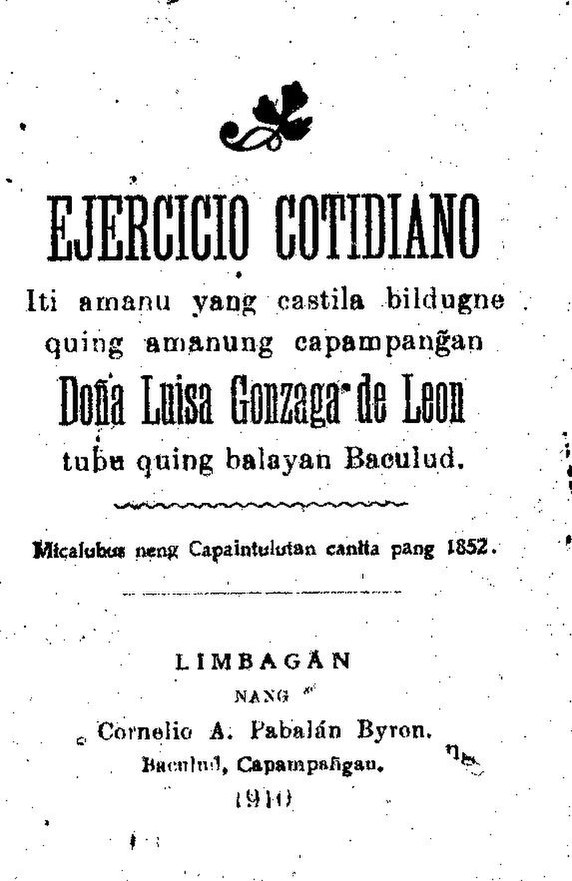
Title page of the 1910 edition of Ejercicio Cotidiano.

Based on the bibliographic record, historians believe Gonzaga de León's Ejercicio Cotidiano (Daily Devotion) to be the first book published by a native Filipino woman. The book translates, from Spanish and Tagalog to Kapampangan, Catholic prayers and the liturgy of the Catholic mass. While the 308 page book had a Spanish title, its subtitle was Kapampangan. Its translation: "Translated from the Spanish language to the Kapampangan language by Doña Luisa Gonzaga de Leon, India of the town of Bacolor."

Though the Spanish Civil Code governing the Philippines during her lifetime allowed women to publish only through her husband's permission, Gonzaga de Leon's status as a widow allowed her to bypass this obstacle. Her 1843 death, however, preceded the publication of her book. Her sons published, through the University of Santo Tomas, Ejercicio Cotidiano in the year or two after her death.

Spanish priests had not translated the texts associated with the Catholic mass into any of the native Filipino languages. The publication of de León's translations marked the first time the Catholic texts and prayers became accessible to a native Filipino people in the vernacular (in this case, Kapangpangan).

=== Editions ===
No known copies of the book's first printing exist. The National Library of the Philippines possesses a copy of the 1854 second edition, which was printed by the University of Santo Tomás Press. The National Library had acquired this copy from the Compañía General de Tabacos (General Tobacco Company of the Philippines). It was one of a handful of the National Library's collection which survived World War II.

The only other known copy of this second edition is held in Library of the Colegio de Padres Agustinos in Valladolid, Spain. Further editions include the 1867, 1910, and 1967 reprintings. Gonzaga de Leon's descendent Don Mariano A. Henson published the last edition as the Catholic church began implementing the Second Vatican Council decision to deliver the mass in the language spoken by worshippers.

=== Sections ===
The Ejercicio Cotidiano included sections on Prayers for Confession and Communion, Way of the Cross, Holy Rosary. It also included a section called Trisagium which contained sets of three-day prayers in praise of the Holy Trinity.

==== Preface ====
Due to its being mostly a translation, the preface represents the most original part wherein Gonzaga de Leon's personal voice shines through. This preface, the first printed essay by a Filipina writer, was "a spiritual essay rising, in the end, to poetry of mystic inspiration" similar to the ecstatic articulations of Teresa of Ávila.

The preface opens with a reference to the author's "sad and frail condition" and acknowledgment of certain limitations, including a lack of mastery in the Spanish or Tagalog languages from which she translates. She possessed more proficiency in Spanish than Tagalog.

==== Illustrations ====
24 illustrations by an engraver named Noguera are interspersed throughout the text. These images portray different aspects of the Catholic mass and significant events from Jesus's life. Noguera may have been an indio, a Filipino native. Notably, the illustrations also depict a native Filipino priest delivering mass, rather than a Spaniard.
