= Legislative districts of Nueva Ecija =

Legislative district of the Philippines

The legislative districts of Nueva Ecija are the representations of the province of Nueva Ecija in the various national legislatures of the Philippines. The province is currently represented in the lower house of the Congress of the Philippines through its first, second, third, and fourth congressional districts.

== History ==
Nueva Ecija constituted Nueva Ecija into a single assembly district for the Malolos Congress, wherein it was represented by three delegates, from 1898 to 1899. Philippine Commission Act No. 1582 later revived the district for the first elections to the lower chamber of the bicameral Philippine Legislature in 1907. The province was later divided into two districts with the enactment of Act No. 3336 on December 7, 1926; their separate representatives were first elected in the 1928 elections.

When seats for the upper house of the Philippine Legislature were elected from territory-based districts between 1916 and 1935, the province formed part of the third senatorial district which elected two out of the 24-member senate.

During the Japanese occupation of the Philippines in the Second World War, two delegates represented Nueva Ecija in the unicameral National Assembly of the Second Philippine Republic: one was the provincial governor (an ex officio member), while the other was indirectly elected through local conventions of KALIBAPI party members.

The pre-war two-representative district configuration was restored upon the re-establishment of the Philippine Commonwealth in 1945, and lasted until the disbandment of Congress in 1972 as a result of the declaration of Martial Law. Two chartered cities created during this period — Cabanatuan (1950) and Palayan (1965) — remained part of the second congressional district of Nueva Ecija, by virtue of Republic Act No. 526 (§90) and Republic Act No. 4475 (§42), respectively.

Nueva Ecija was represented in the Interim Batasang Pambansa as part of Region III from 1978 to 1984, and elected four representatives, at large, to the Regular Batasang Pambansa in 1984.

The province was reapportioned into four congressional districts under the new Constitution which was proclaimed on February 11, 1987, and elected members to the restored House of Representatives starting that same year.

== Current Districts ==
Nueva Ecija's current congressional delegation is composed of four members since 1987.

Political parties

PFP (3)
NUP (1)

Legislative districts and representatives of Nueva Ecija
District	Current Representative		Party	Constituent LGUs	Population (2020)	Area	Map
District	Image	Name	Party	Constituent LGUs	Population (2020)	Area	Map
1st		Mikaela Angela Suansing (since 2022); Zaragoza	PFP	List: Aliaga; Cuyapo; Guimba; Licab; Nampicuan; Quezon; Santo Domingo; Talavera; Zaragoza	598,187	1,027.38 km²	
2nd		Kokoy Salvador (since 2025); San Jose	PFP	List: Carranglan; Llanera; Lupao; Munoz; Pantabangan; Rizal; San Jose; Talugtug	493,038	1,897.18 km²	
3rd		Jay Vergara (since 2025); Cabanatuan	PFP	List: Cabanatuan; Palayan; Bongabon; Gabaldon; General Mamerto Natividad; Laur; Santa Rosa	636,728	1,384.55 km²	
4th		Emerson Pascual (since 2022); Gapan	NUP	List: Cabiao; Gapan; General Tinio; Jaen; Peñaranda; San Antonio; San Isidro; San Leonardo	582,181	1,351.76 km²	

== Historical Districts ==
=== Lone District (defunct) ===
Period	Representative
1st Philippine Legislature; 1907–1909	Isauro Gabaldon
2nd Philippine Legislature; 1909–1912	Isauro Gabaldon
3rd Philippine Legislature; 1912–1916	Lucio Gonzales
4th Philippine Legislature; 1916–1919	Isidoro Gonzales
5th Philippine Legislature; 1919–1922	Gaudencio Medina
6th Philippine Legislature; 1922–1925	Hermogenes Concepcion
7th Philippine Legislature; 1925–1928	vacant (Note: Isauro Gabaldon, the winner of the June 1925 election, was disqualified for lack of residency, as he had been serving in Washington, D.C. as the Resident Commissioner of the Philippines in the United States Congress since 1920. However, Gabaldon was re-elected as Resident Commissioner in late 1925 and served in the 69th United States Congress starting March 4, 1926.)
7th Philippine Legislature; 1925–1928	Feliciano Ramoso (Note: Won in a special election held on March 22, 1926 to replace Isauro Gabaldon.)

=== 1898–1899 ===
Period	Representatives
Malolos Congress; 1898–1899	José Turiano Santiago
Malolos Congress; 1898–1899	Epifanio de los Santos
Malolos Congress; 1898–1899	Gregorio Macapinlac

=== 1943–1944 ===
Period	Representatives
National Assembly; 1943–1944	Hermogenes Concepcion
National Assembly; 1943–1944	Jose Robles, Jr. (ex officio)

=== 1984–1986 ===
Period	Representatives
Regular Batasang Pambansa; 1984–1986	Angel D. Concepcion
Regular Batasang Pambansa; 1984–1986	Leopoldo D. Diaz
Regular Batasang Pambansa; 1984–1986	Mario S. Garcia
Regular Batasang Pambansa; 1984–1986	Eduardo Nonato N. Joson
