= Hermogenes Concepcion =

Filipino lawyer and politician

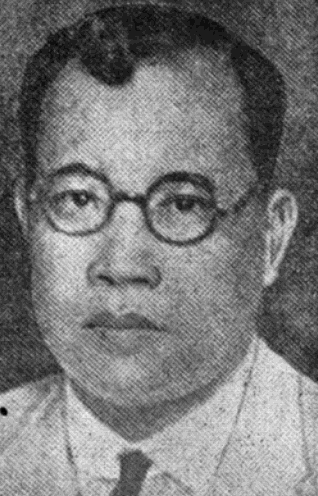
- Senatorial portrait of Concepcion, published by Benipayo Press, c. 1935

Member of the National Assembly from Nueva Ecija
- In office September 25, 1943 – February 2, 1944 Serving with José Robles Jr.

Senator of the Philippines from the 3rd District
- In office June 5, 1934 – September 16, 1935
- Preceded by: Benigno Aquino Sr.
- Succeeded by: office abolished

Member of the House of Representatives from Nueva Ecija
- In office June 5, 1928 – June 2, 1931
- Preceded by: district established
- Succeeded by: Manuel Gallego
- Constituency: 1st district
- In office 1922–1924
- Preceded by: Gaudencio Medina
- Succeeded by: Feliciano Ramoso
- Constituency: at-large district

Personal details
- Born: April 19, 1887 Cabanatuan, Nueva Ecija, Captaincy General of the Philippines
- Died: 1988 (aged 100–101)
- Party: KALIBAPI (1942–1945); Nacionalista (1922–1935)
- Spouse: Rosario Diaz
- Children: 4 (including Hermogenes Jr.)

Hermogenes Sombillo Concepcion (April 19, 1887 – 1988) was a Filipino lawyer and politician. He represented the lone district of Nueva Ecija at the House of Representatives of the Philippines from June 6, 1922, to June 2, 1925, and again from September 25, 1943, to February 2, 1944 (National Assembly). He also represented the first district of Nueva Ecija at the same house from June 5, 1928, to June 2, 1931. He later represented the third district at the Senate of the Philippines from June 5, 1934, to September 16, 1935.

== Early life and education ==
Hermogenes Concepcion was born in Cabanatuan, Nueva Ecija on April 19, 1887, to Angel Concepcion and Angela Sombillo. He obtained his Bachelor of Laws degree in 1915.

== Political career ==
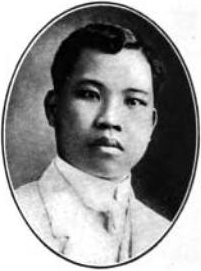
Concepcion in 1915

He was elected as a member of the House of Representatives from the at-large district of Nueva Ecija from 1922 to 1925 and for the 1st district from 1928 to 1931. In 1934, he was elected senator from the 3rd District comprising Tarlac, Nueva Ecija, Pampanga and Bulacan, serving until the legislature was replaced by the unicameral National Assembly in 1935.

During the Second World War, he became a member of the National Assembly of the Japanese-installed Second Philippine Republic, representing Nueva Ecija.
