= Isauro Gabaldón =

Filipino politician (1875–1942)

The Honorable Isauro Gabaldón
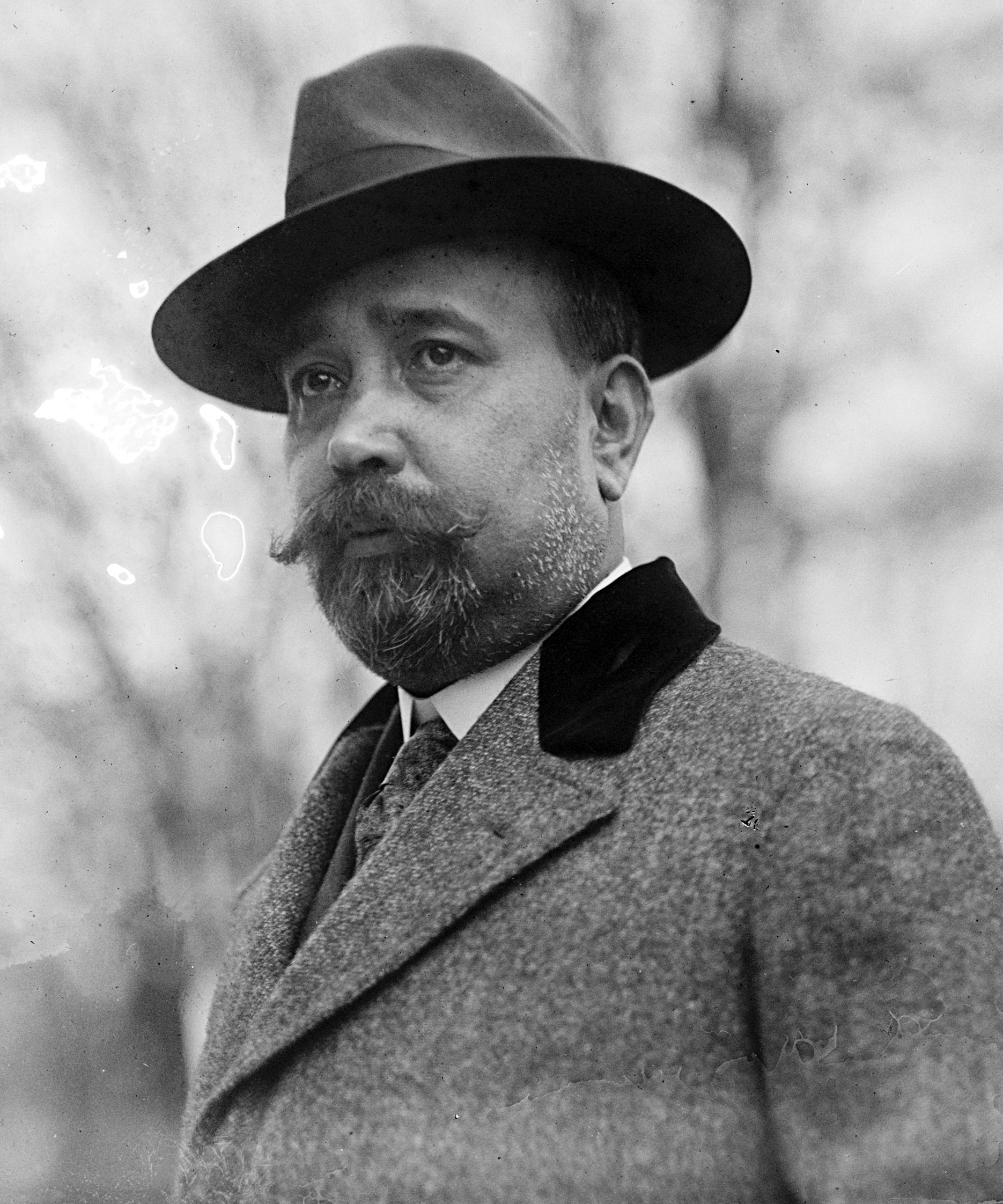
- Gabaldón in 1920

Senator of the Philippines from the Third Senatorial District
- In office October 16, 1916 – June 3, 1919 Serving with Francisco Tongio Liongson
- Preceded by: Post created
- Succeeded by: Teodoro Sandiko

Resident Commissioner to the U.S. House of Representatives from the Philippine Islands
- In office March 4, 1920 – July 16, 1928 Serving with Jaime C. De Veyra (1920–1923); Pedro Guevara (1923–1929)
- Preceded by: Teodoro R. Yangco
- Succeeded by: Camilo Osías

Member of the Philippine House of Representatives from Nueva Ecija's Second District
- In office June 5, 1934 – September 16, 1935
- Preceded by: Felipe Buencamino Jr.
- Succeeded by: Felipe Buencamino Jr.

Member of the Philippine Assembly from Nueva Ecija's Lone District
- In office October 16, 1907 – October 16, 1912
- Preceded by: Post recreated (Note: Post last held by Epifanio de los Santos, José Turiano Santiago, and Gregorio Macapinlac at the Malolos Congress)
- Succeeded by: Lucio Gonzales

3rd Governor of Nueva Ecija
- In office 1906–1907
- Preceded by: Epifanio de los Santos
- Succeeded by: Manuel Tinio

Personal details
- Born: Isauro González; December 8, 1875 San Isidro, Nueva Ecija, Captaincy General of the Philippines
- Died: December 21, 1942 (aged 67) Manila, Philippine Commonwealth
- Resting place: Manila North Cemetery
- Party: Nacionalista
- Education: University of Santo Tomas

Isauro Gabaldón y González (born Isauro González; December 8, 1875 – December 21, 1942) was a Filipino politician who served as a resident commissioner of the Philippines to the United States House of Representatives, serving from 1920 until 1928.

== Early life ==
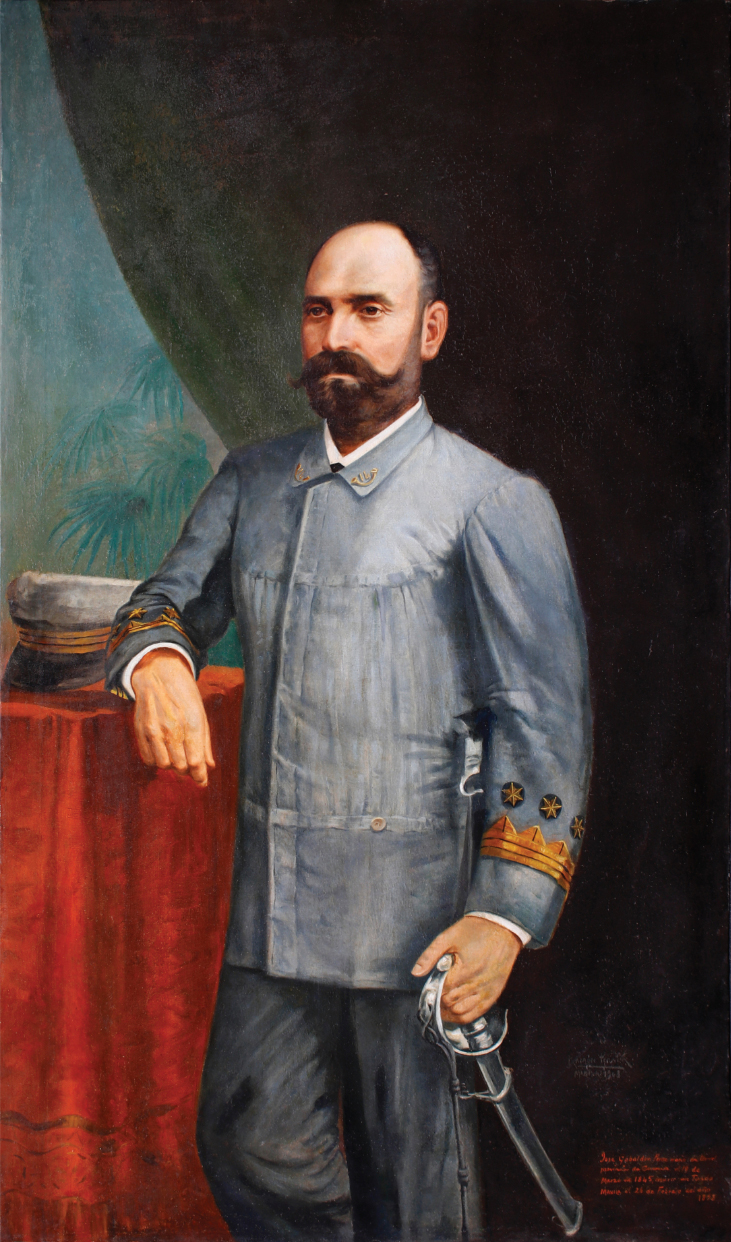
Gabaldón's father, José Gabaldón y Pérez

Gabaldón was born in San Isidro, Nueva Ecija, Captaincy General of the Philippines (present-day Philippines) on December 8, 1875, and was a Spanish Filipino, the son of José Gabaldón Pérez, a Spaniard from Tébar, Cuenca, and of María González Mendoza, a mestiza. He was the grandson by paternal side of Lorenzo Gabaldón and Luisa Pérez, and by maternal side of Cosmé González and Bárbara Mendoza.

== Education and law practice ==
Gabaldón attended the public schools in Tebar, Spain, which was his father's hometown. He studied law at the Universidad Central in Madrid, Spain and graduated from the Univérsidad de Santo Tomas in Manila, Philippines. He practiced law from 1903 to 1906.

== Political career ==
Gabaldón served as governor of the province of Nueva Ecija in 1906 and from 1912 to 1916. He was a member of the Philippine Assembly from 1907 to 1912. He later served in the Philippine Senate between 1916 and 1919. He was elected as a Nationalist and a resident commissioner to the United States in 1920. He was reelected in 1923 and 1925, and served from March 4, 1920, until his resignation effective July 16, 1928, having been nominated for election to the Philippine House of Representatives. He had also been elected in 1925 as a member of the Philippine House of Representatives, but did not qualify, preferring to continue as commissioner until resigning in 1928.

== Death ==
Gabaldón died on December 21, 1942.

== Legacy ==
Gabaldón lends his name to American-era public elementary schools built through the bills he sponsored thru the Philippines Assembly Act No. 1801 or "the Gabaldon Law" of 1907.

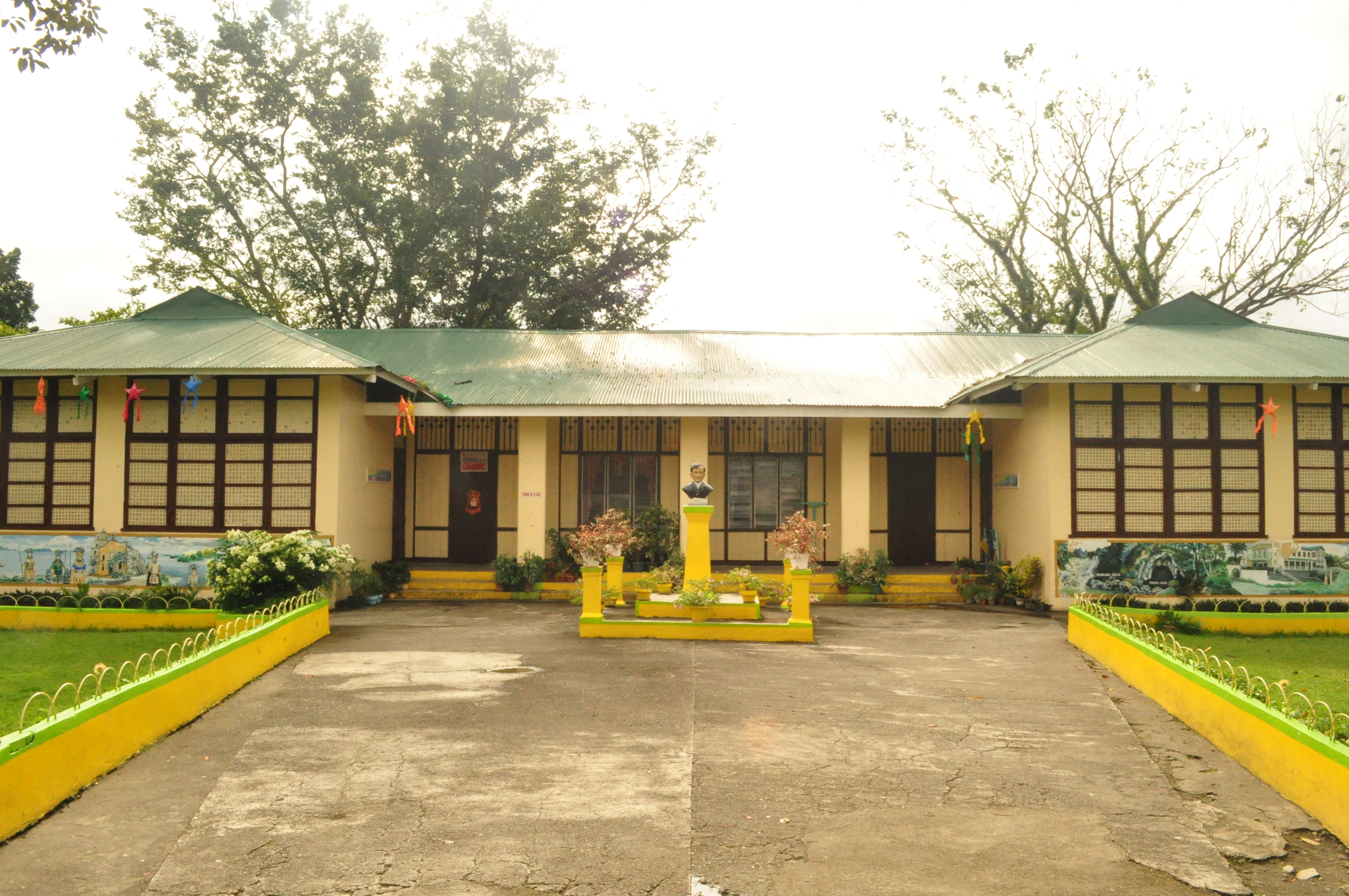
Gabaldon School in Boac, Marinduque

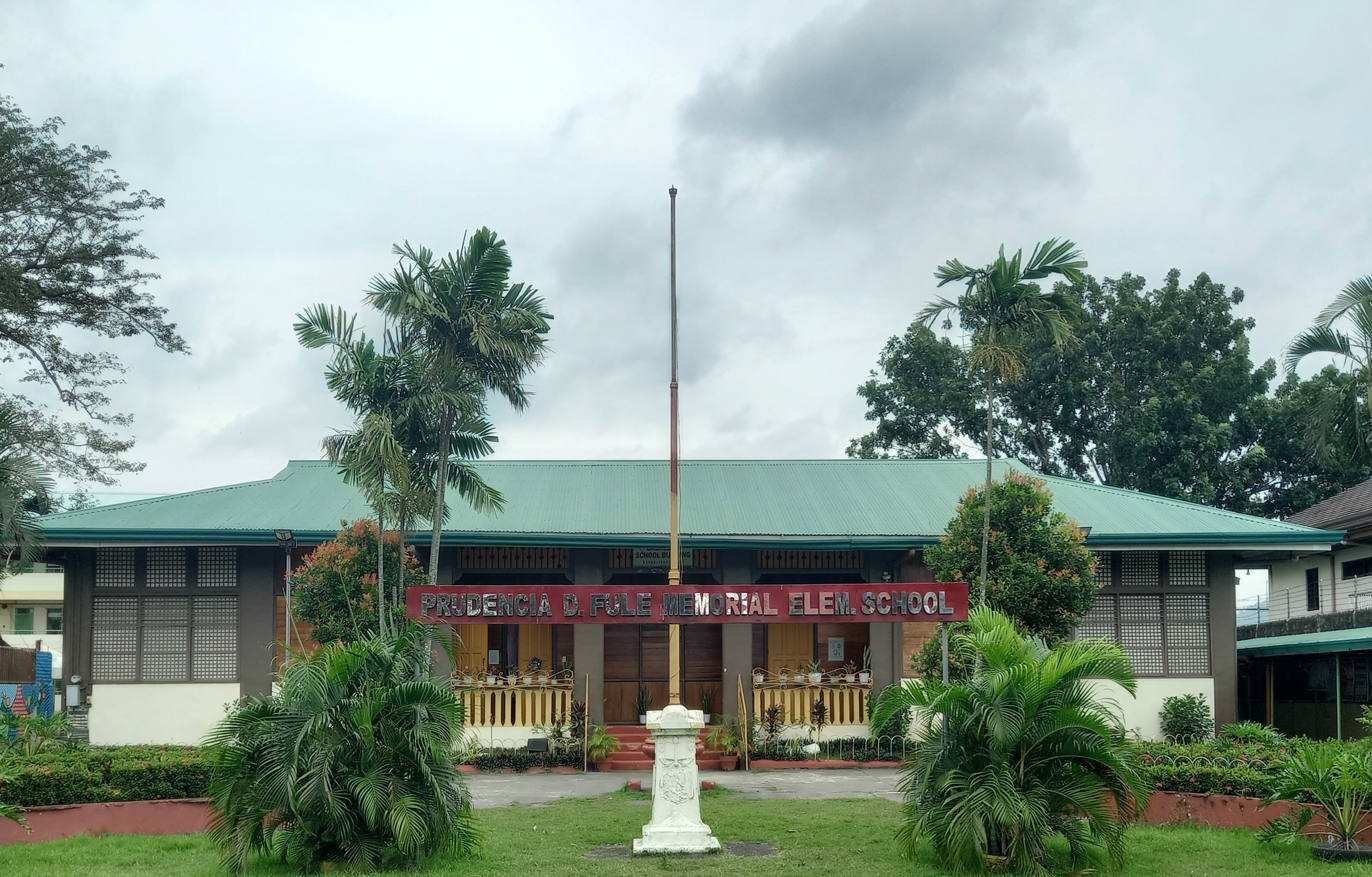
An example of Gabaldon School in San Pablo City, Laguna

== Gallery ==
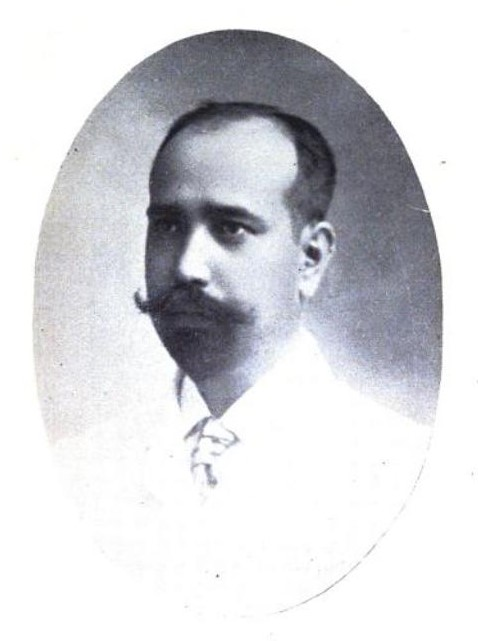
Gabaldón as a member of the Philippine Assembly (1908)

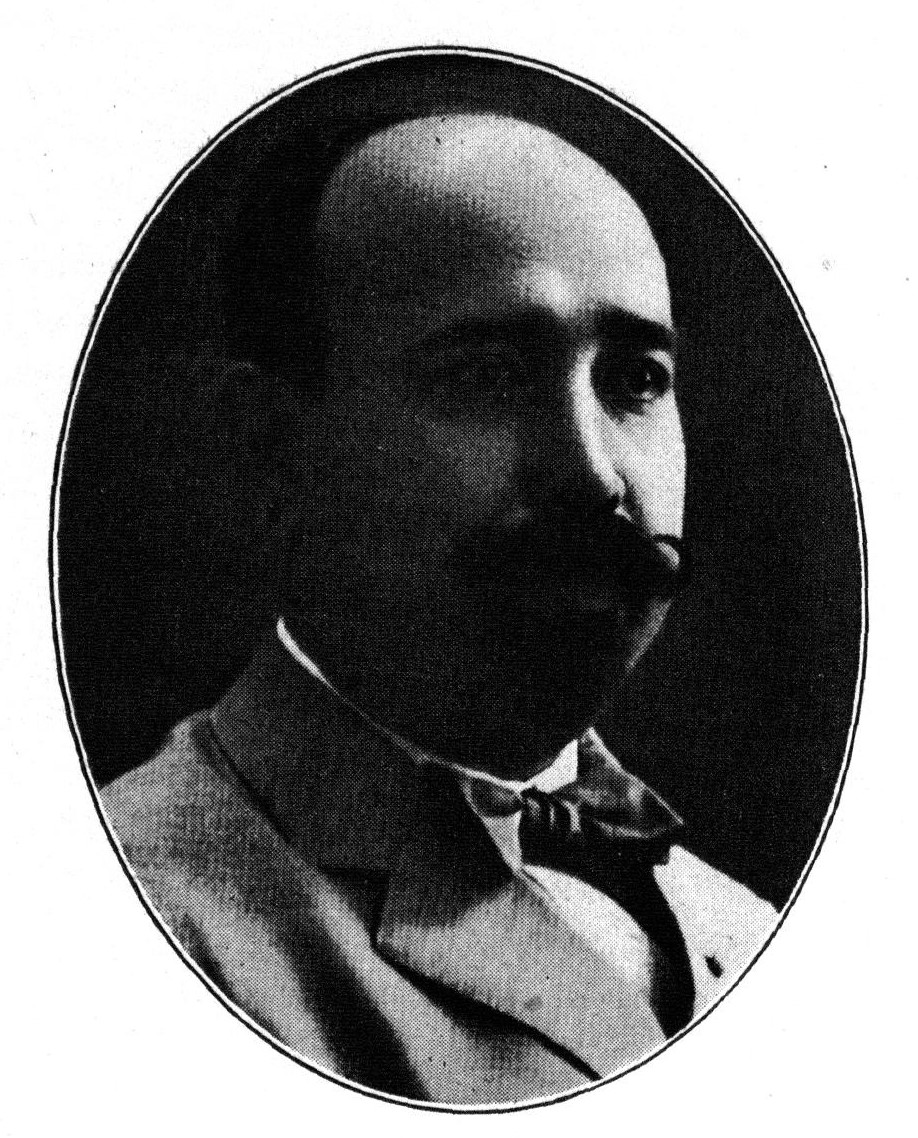
Gabaldón in 1917

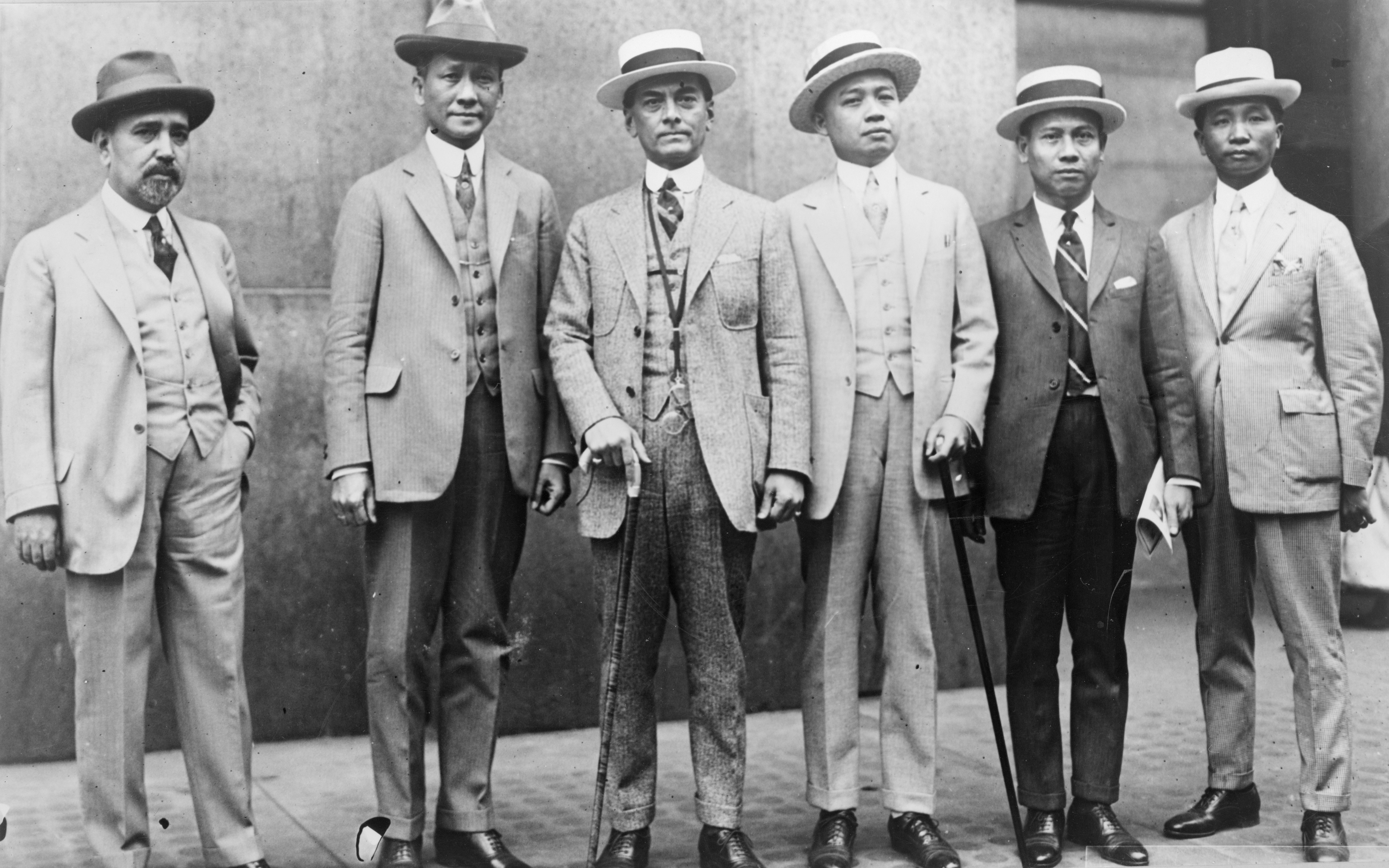
Gabaldón with representatives from the Philippine Independence Mission (1924)

== See also ==
- Gabaldon School Buildings
- List of Asian Americans and Pacific Islands Americans in the United States Congress
- List of Hispanic and Latino Americans in the United States Congress
- Resident Commissioner of the Philippines

== Notes ==
U.S. House of Representatives
Preceded by Teodoro R. Yangco	Resident Commissioner from the Philippines to the United States Congress; 1920–1928; Served alongside: Jaime C. de Veyra and Pedro Guevara	Succeeded by Camilo Osías
