= Marina Dizon =

Filipino revolutionary (1875–1951)

- Born: Marina Bartolome Dizon; July 18, 1875; Tondo, Manila, Captaincy General of the Philippines
- Died: October 25, 1950 (aged 75); Caloocan, Rizal, Philippines
- Known for: Philippine Revolution
- Political party: Katipunan
- Spouse: José Turiano Santiago

Marina Bartolome Dizon-Santiago (July 18, 1875 – October 25, 1950) a native of Tondo, Manila, was a heroine of the Philippine Revolution and one of the first women initiated into the Katipunan. She also kept important documents for the Katipunan.

== Early life and career ==
Marina was the daughter of José Dizon, one of the Thirteen Martyrs of Bagumbayan, and Roberta Bartolomé, who died when Marina was only eight years old. After her mother's death, her aunt, Josefa Dizon, mother of Emilio Jacinto, took care of her. Her father was an active associate of Andres Bonifacio and almost all of her family members were patriots and nationalists. She was enrolled at a private school that was led by Maestro Timoteo Reyes. Marina later studied at a public school under Aniceta Cabrera, where she met her classmate and future husband, José Turiano Santiago. She was a student of the arts, music, painting, and modeling, and later became an accomplished singer. She was the guitarist and violinist of the Trozo Comparsa Band.

== Katipunan ==
In 1893, Marina accompanied her cousin Emilio Jacinto to the house of Don Restituto Javier. It was there that she and a number of other women were initiated into the Katipunan. Marina became an active member, presided over initiation rites, kept records, and taught new members the constitution and teachings. Marina always said, "Be cheerful at all times, do not show signs of any impending rebellion. Be prepared to be orphans and widows. Be brave and carry on". These are the words that inspired the women of the Katipunan. When her father was executed in Bagumbayan in 1897 and her husband was arrested in August of the same year, she burned all the records of the Katipunan in order to prevent the Spaniards from learning more about the group. She sold all her belongings to raise money to bribe her husband's guards. Finally, her husband was released on September 11, 1897.

== American occupation ==
Marina and her husband were forced to move to Meycauayan and later moved to Tarlac when the hostilities ended. She left her husband and proceeded to Bamban. Her husband went to Manila to work as an accountant and later was suspected as a revolutionary. An arrest order was issued for his capture. In order to avoid arrest, he fled to Hong Kong. Marina was left in the Philippines, and later reconciled with her husband when he returned.

=== Death ===
She died on October 25, 1950, at 2444 Angat Street, Juan Luna Subdivision, Gagalangin, Tondo, Manila, in the house of Mrs. Luz D. Santiago de Bleza, daughter of the deceased.
