= Nueva Ecija's at-large congressional district =

Legislative district of the Philippines

Nueva Ecija's at-large congressional district was the provincewide electoral district of Nueva Ecija for Philippine national legislatures before 1987.

The district was first created ahead of the 1898 Philippine legislative election for two seats in the Malolos Congress. Epifanio de los Santos and José Turiano Santiago were elected at-large as Nueva Ecija's representatives in the National Assembly of the nascent First Philippine Republic, with a third seat allocated for an appointed delegate from Pampanga, Gregorio Macapinlac. After the fall of the Republic, the U.S. insular government was installed which reorganized a legislative assembly for representatives of the different provinces in 1907, the Philippine Assembly. Nueva Ecija was given one seat in that legislature and continued to elect its representatives from this single-member at-large district until the 1926 reapportionment into two smaller districts which took effect beginning with the 1928 Philippine House of Representatives elections.

Nueva Ecija returned to at-large elections for a seat in the National Assembly of the Second Philippine Republic in 1943. The restoration of the Commonwealth government and the House of Representatives in 1945 also restored the two districts in the province thereby eliminating the provincewide electoral district. It was recreated for the last time ahead of the 1984 Philippine parliamentary election following a shift from regional electoral districts in the interim parliament, where Nueva Ecija was included in the multi-member at-large representation of Region III (Central Luzon) from 1978 to 1984, to provincial and city district constituencies in the regular parliament.

The district became obsolete following the 1987 reapportionment that established four districts in the province under a new constitution.

== Representation history ==
#	Term of office		National Assembly	Seat A				Seat B				Seat C							
#	Start	End	National Assembly	Image	Member	Party	Electoral history	Image	Member	Party	Electoral history	Image	Member	Party	Electoral history				
=== Nueva Ecija's at-large district for the Malolos Congress ===
District created June 18, 1898.
–	September 15, 1898	March 23, 1901	1st		José Turiano Santiago	Independent	Elected in 1898.		Epifanio de los Santos	Independent	Elected in 1898.		Gregorio Macapinlac	Independent	Appointed.				
#	Term of office		Legislature	Single seat															
#	Start	End	Legislature	Image	Member	Party	Electoral history												
=== Nueva Ecija's at-large district for the Philippine Assembly ===
District re-created January 9, 1907.
1	October 16, 1907	October 16, 1912	1st		Isauro Gabaldón	Nacionalista	Elected in 1907.												
1	October 16, 1907	October 16, 1912	2nd		Isauro Gabaldón	Nacionalista	Re-elected in 1909.												
2	October 16, 1912	October 16, 1916	3rd		Lucio Gonzales	Nacionalista	Elected in 1912.												
#	Term of office		Legislature	Single seat															
#	Start	End	Legislature	Image	Member	Party	Electoral history												
=== Nueva Ecija's at-large district for the House of Representatives of the Philippine Islands ===
3	October 16, 1916	June 3, 1919	4th		Isidoro Gonzales	Nacionalista	Elected in 1916.												
4	June 3, 1919	June 6, 1922	5th		Gaudencio Medina	Nacionalista	Elected in 1919.												
5	June 6, 1922	June 2, 1925	6th		Hermogenes Concepción Sr.	Demócrata	Elected in 1922.												
(1)	–	–	7th		Isauro Gabaldón	Nacionalista Consolidado	Elected in 1925. Disqualified for lack of residency.												
6	March 22, 1926	June 5, 1928	7th		Feliciano Ramoso	Nacionalista; Consolidado	Elected in 1926 to fill vacancy.												
District dissolved into Nueva Ecija's 1st and 2nd districts.
#	Term of office		National Assembly	Seat A				Seat B											
#	Start	End	National Assembly	Image	Member	Party	Electoral history	Image	Member	Party	Electoral history								
=== Nueva Ecija's at-large district for the National Assembly (Second Philippine Republic) ===
District re-created September 7, 1943.
–	September 25, 1943	February 2, 1944	1st		Hermogenes Concepción Sr.	KALIBAPI	Elected in 1943.		José Robles Jr.	KALIBAPI	Appointed as an ex officio member.								
District dissolved into Nueva Ecija's 1st and 2nd districts.
#	Term of office		Batasang Pambansa	Seat A				Seat B				Seat C				Seat D			
#	Start	End	Batasang Pambansa	Image	Member	Party	Electoral history	Image	Member	Party	Electoral history	Image	Member	Party	Electoral history	Image	Member	Party	Electoral history
=== Nueva Ecija's at-large district for the Regular Batasang Pambansa ===
District re-created February 1, 1984.
–	July 23, 1984	March 25, 1986	2nd		Angel D. Concepcion	KBL	Elected in 1984.		Leopoldo D. Diaz	KBL	Elected in 1984.		Mario S. Garcia	KBL	Elected in 1984.		Eduardo Nonato Joson	KBL	Elected in 1984.
District dissolved into Nueva Ecija's 1st, 2nd, 3rd and 4th districts.

== See also ==
- Legislative districts of Nueva Ecija
