= Epifanio de los Santos =

Filipino academic (1871–1928)

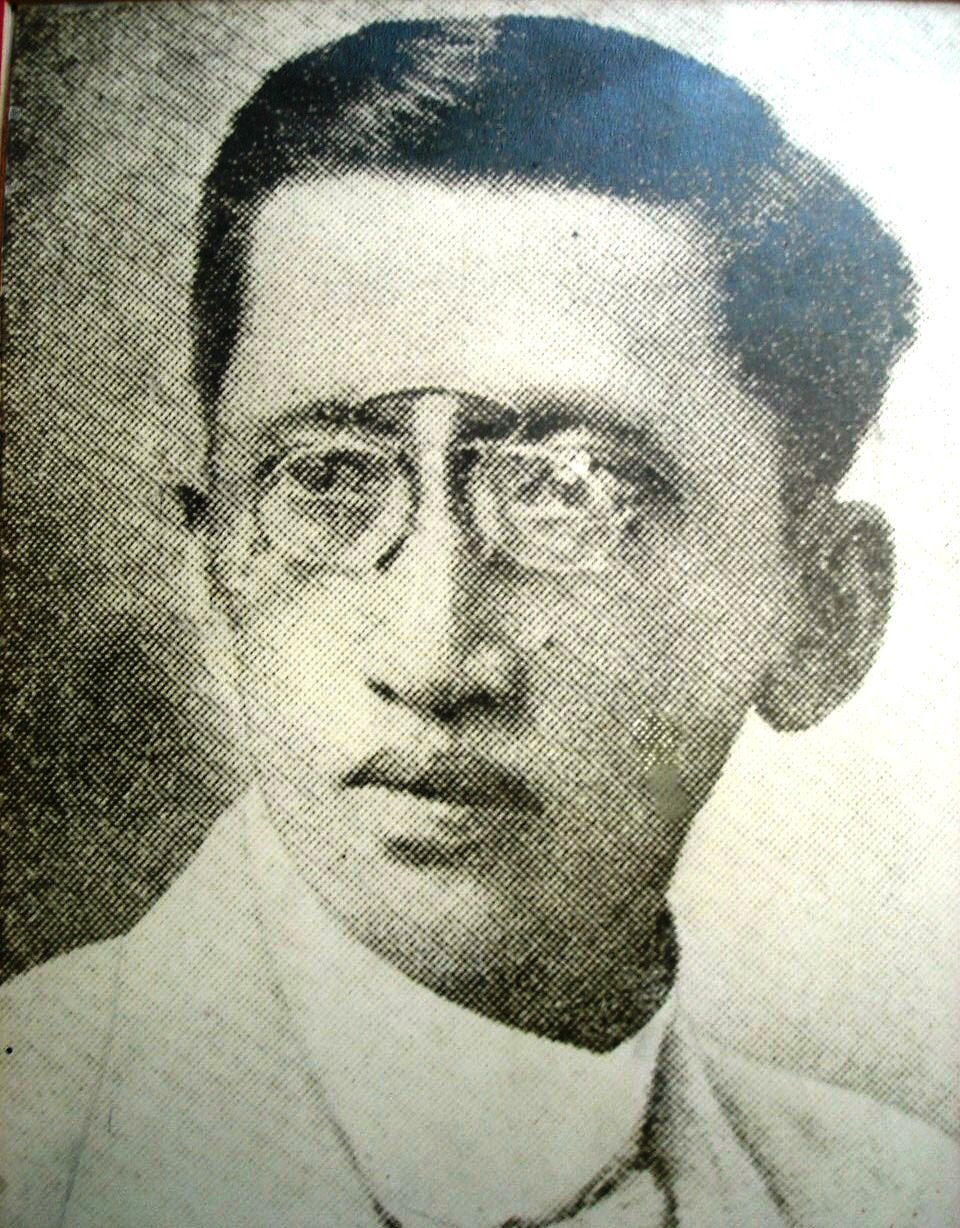
- de los Santos graduation picture at Ateneo de Manila

Director of the Philippine Library and Museum
- In office May 16, 1925 – April 18, 1928
- Appointed by: Leonard Wood
- Preceded by: Trinidad Pardo de Tavera
- Succeeded by: Teodoro M. Kalaw (as Director of the National Library of the Philippines)

2nd Governor of Nueva Ecija
- In office 1902–1906
- Preceded by: Felino Cajucom
- Succeeded by: Isauro Gabaldon

Member of the Malolos Congress from Nueva Ecija
- In office September 15, 1898 – November 13, 1899 Serving with José Turiano Santiago and Gregorio Macapinlac

Personal details
- Born: Epifanio de los Santos y Cristóbal; April 7, 1871 Malabon, Manila, Captaincy General of the Philippines
- Died: April 18, 1928 (aged 57) Manila, Philippine Islands
- Resting place: Manila North Cemetery
- Spouse(s): Ursula Paez; Margarita Torralba
- Children: 12
- Education: Ateneo Municipal de Manila (BA); University of Santo Tomas (LLB)
- Occupation: Writer; researcher; lawyer; politician; public servant
- Known for: Historian, journalist, and civil servant
- Nickname(s): Don Pañong, G. Solon (pen name), Señor de los Santos, ED or EDS (acronym)

Epifanio de los Santos y Cristóbal, also known as Don Pañong or Don Panyong (April 7, 1871 – April 18, 1928), was a notable Filipino historian, journalist, and civil servant. He was regarded by some as one of the best Filipino writers of his time.

He also entered politics, serving as a member of the Malolos Congress from 1898 to 1899 representing Nueva Ecija and later as governor of Nueva Ecija from 1902 to 1906. As a lawyer, he was named the district attorney of San Isidro, Nueva Ecija in 1900 and later as fiscal of the provinces of Bulacan and Bataan. He was named as an assistant technical director of the Philippine Census in 1918. He was appointed Director of the Philippine Library and Museum by Governor General Leonard Wood in 1925, serving until his death in 1928.

== Early life and marriage ==
Epifanio de los Santos was born on April 7, 1871, in Potrero, Malabon, Province of Manila to Escolastico de los Santos of Nueva Ecija and musician Antonina Cristóbal y Tongco. He studied at the Ateneo Municipal de Manila where he obtained a Bachelor of Arts degree. He devoted some time to painting, but music became part of his daily life and he was even awarded a professorship in music. He finished his law studies at the University of Santo Tomas and took the bar exams in 1898.

Rafael Palma (1930) noted that during his college years, his collecting instinct was already evident when he dedicated himself to gathering plants and flowers in Nueva Ecija, where he also sought the company of and spent time with rural communities. According to Agoncillo, "Nobody suspected that he would someday become a literary man". As a young law student, his interest in Spanish literature developed through readings of Juan Valera's novel entitled "Pepita Jimenez" and other available works. He later developed a friendship with Valera after meeting him in Spain.

His home in Intramuros became a meeting place for literary figures including Cecilio Apóstol (Catulo), Fernando María Guerrero (Fulvio Gil), José Palma, Rafael Palma, Jaime C. de Veyra, Macario Pineda, Mariano V. del Rosario, Salvador V. del Rosario, Ysidro Paredes, Macario Adriatico, Jose Clemente Zulueta and Jose G. Abreu. He painted an oil portrait of Rosa Sevilla and composed a melody dedicated to her.

Epifanio's first wife was Doña Ursula Paez of Malabon; his second was Margarita Torralba of Malolos. His son Jose, from his first wife, became a historian, biographer, and collector. His brother, Escolastico, became a pianist for silent films and contributed as a poet and realist story teller to Philippine magazines and newspapers. His son Socrates, from his second wife, became a leading Pentagon aeronautics engineer.

He has two lines of descendants with four children with his first wife Ursula Paez: Jose, Rosario, Escolastico and Antonio; and eight children with his second wife Margarita Torralba: Leticia, Fernando, Socrates, Federico, Hipatia Patria, Espacia Lydia, Glicera Ruth & Margarita.

== Literary and scholarly works ==
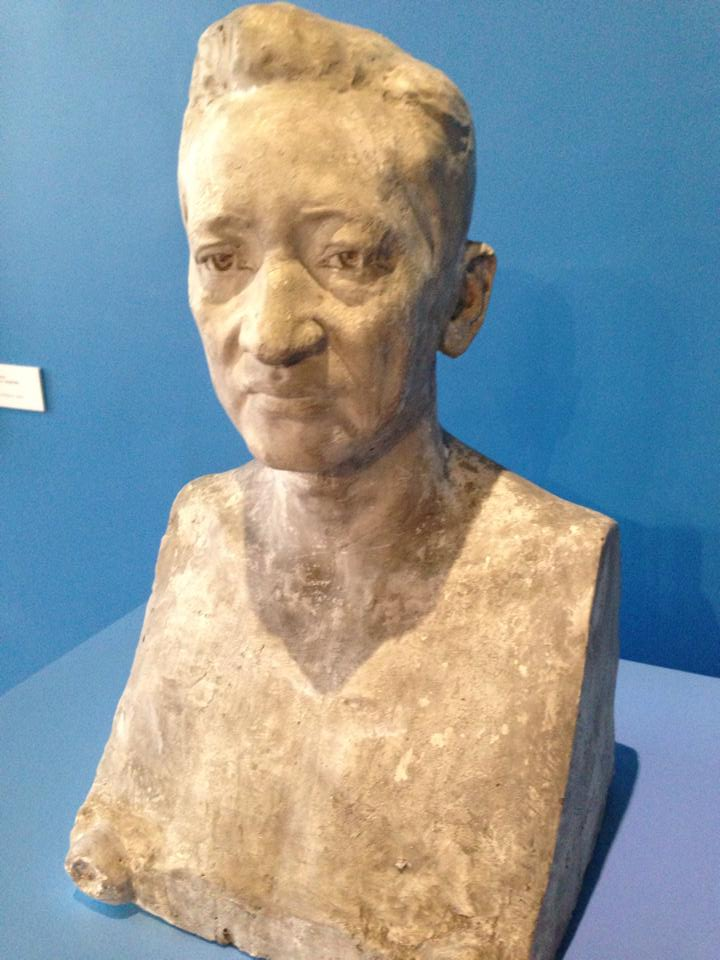
Marble bust of Epifanio made by Guillermo Tolentino

Epifanio was considered by some as one of the best Filipino writers in Spanish of his time. He was a member of the Spanish Royal Academy of Language, Spanish Royal Academy of Literature and Spanish Royal Academy of History in Madrid. His writings were admired by Marcelino Menéndez y Pelayo.

Epifanio was a young associate editor of the revolutionary paper "La Independencia" (1898), writing in prose under the pen name G. Solon and also a member of the Malolos Congress. He also co-founded other newspapers including La Libertad, El Renaciemento, La Democracia, La Patria and Malaysia. His publications include; Algo de Prosa (1909), Literatura Tagala (1911), El Teatro Tagala (1911) Nuestra Literatura (1913), El Proceso del Dr. José Rizal (1914), Folklore Musical de Filipinas (1920). He also authored Filipinos y filipinistas (Filipinos and Filipinists), Filipinas para los Filipinos, Cuentos y paisajes Filipinos (Philippine Stories and Scenes) and Criminality in the Philippines (1903–1908).

He was a member of Samahan ng mga Mananagalog, initiated by Felipe Calderon in 1904, whose active members included Lope K. Santos, Rosa Sevilla, Hermenegildo Cruz, Jaime C. de Veyra and Patricio Mariano. He was fluent in Spanish, English, French, German, Ita, Tingian, and Ibalao. He translated Florante and Laura into Castilian. He was an honorary member of the Academia Filipina de la Lengua Española.

=== Collections ===
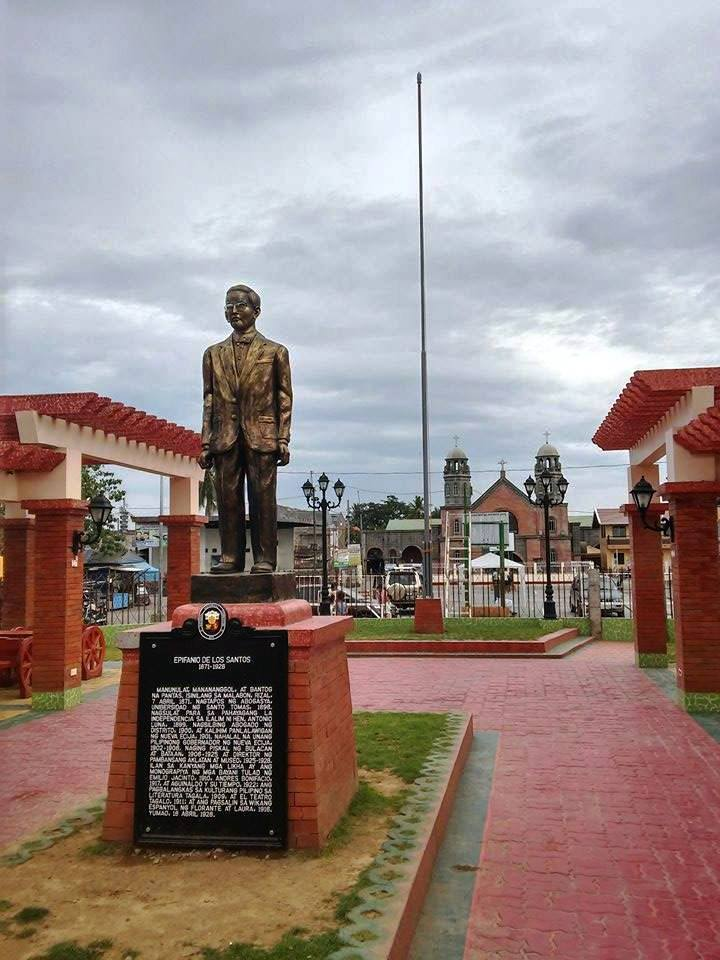
A 10-foot-high (3.0 m) statue of Epifanio de los Santos in San Isidro, Nueva Ecija.

Epifanio de los Santos traveled extensively, searching for rare Philippine documents. He amassed a collection of nearly 200 paintings and sculptures, musical literature, opera records, printed materials, documents and manuscripts related to the revolution and historical pictures. His Filipiniana collection was highly regarded. In Europe, he was recognized as a philologist and biographer of Philippine subjects.

Some documents and printed matter in his collection are considered unique. His Rizaliana collections were acknowledged by W. E. Retana, James A. Le-Roy, and Austin Craig.

His collection includes 115 printed works and 213 documents related to the Philippine revolution.

After de los Santos's death, the Philippine Legislature, under the Philippine Clarin Act, purchased his collection and library for ₱19,250.00.

=== Other interests ===
He was also known as a skilled guitarist.

There is an anecdote about de los Santos and Clemente Jose Zulueta having a disagreement, with Antonio Luna offering his guitar to whoever won the argument. De los Santos reportedly won and received Luna's guitar.

== Public service ==
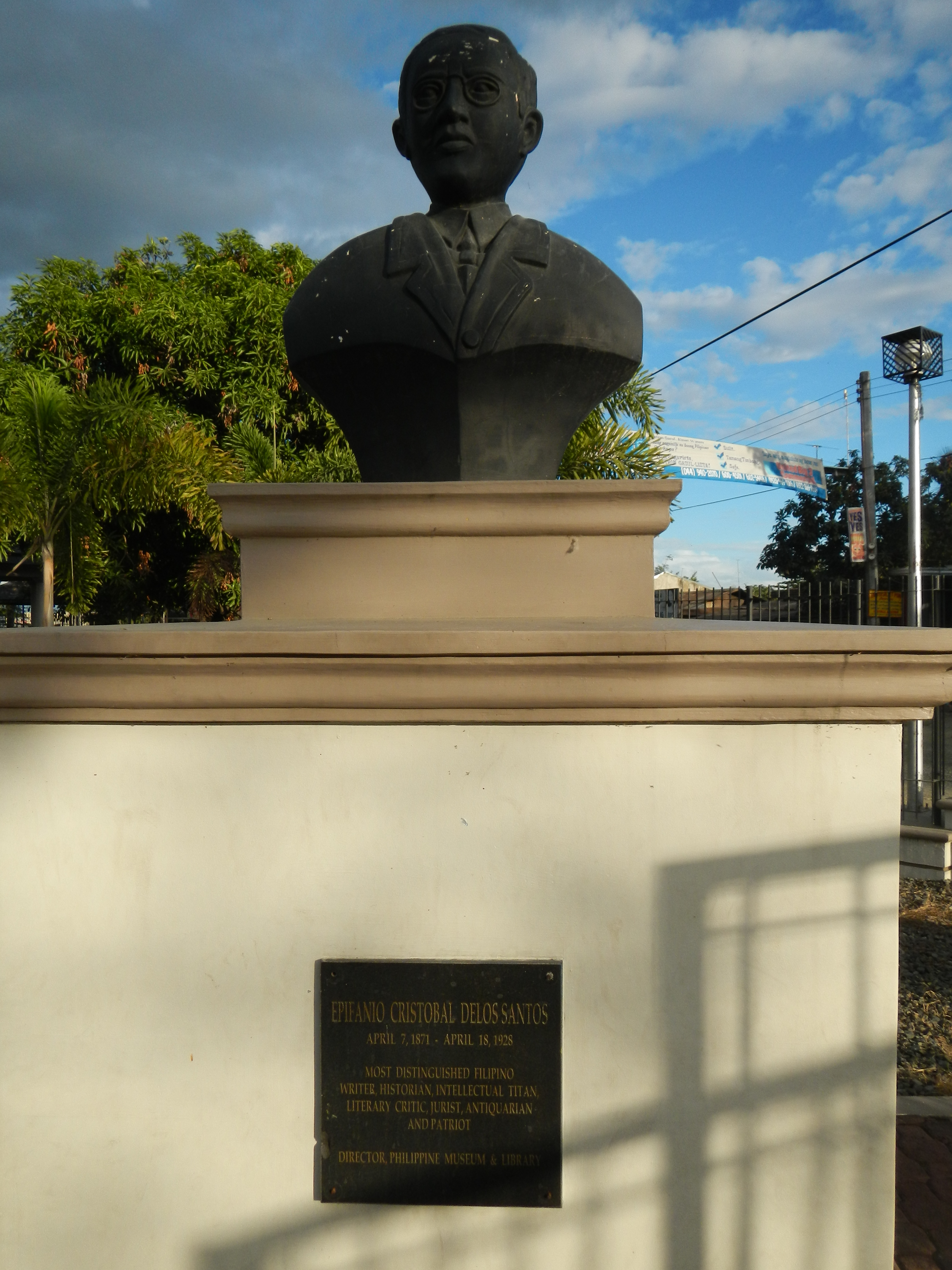
Epifanio de los Santos y Cristóbal bust, memorial, Caalibangbangan Park, Cabanatuan

Epifanio de los Santos was elected to the Malolos Congress in September 1898, serving as one of three representatives from Nueva Ecija until November 1899. In 1900, he was appointed district attorney of San Isidro, Nueva Ecija. He was later elected governor of Nueva Ecija in 1902 and again in 1904, serving until 1906. This made him the first democratically elected provincial governor of Nueva Ecija and head of the Federal Party there. As a member of the Philippine Commission, he was selected to represent the Saint Louis World's Fair in 1904. He was later appointed provincial fiscal of Bulacan and Bataan provinces. He wrote "Electoral Fraud and its Remedies" (Fraudes Electorales y Sus Remedios) in 1907 for the Philippine Assembly. He also dedicated time to research in Philippine history and literature. Some of his collection was destroyed by fires at his house in San Isidro, Nueva Ecija. According to Agoncillo and Palma, his primary interest was not in politics. In 1918, he was appointed assistant technical director of the Philippine Census by Governor General Francis Burton Harrison.

In 1925, de los Santos was appointed Director of the Philippine Library and Museum by Governor General Leonard Wood, succeeding Trinidad Pardo de Tavera. He was also elected as the third President of the Philippine Library Association (now Philippine Librarians Association, Inc.), the first Filipino of native parentage to hold this position. As director of the Philippine Library, he reportedly dedicated himself to his work, giving up "all his other avocations except music and bibliophily," according to Gabriel Bernardo.

== Death and legacy ==
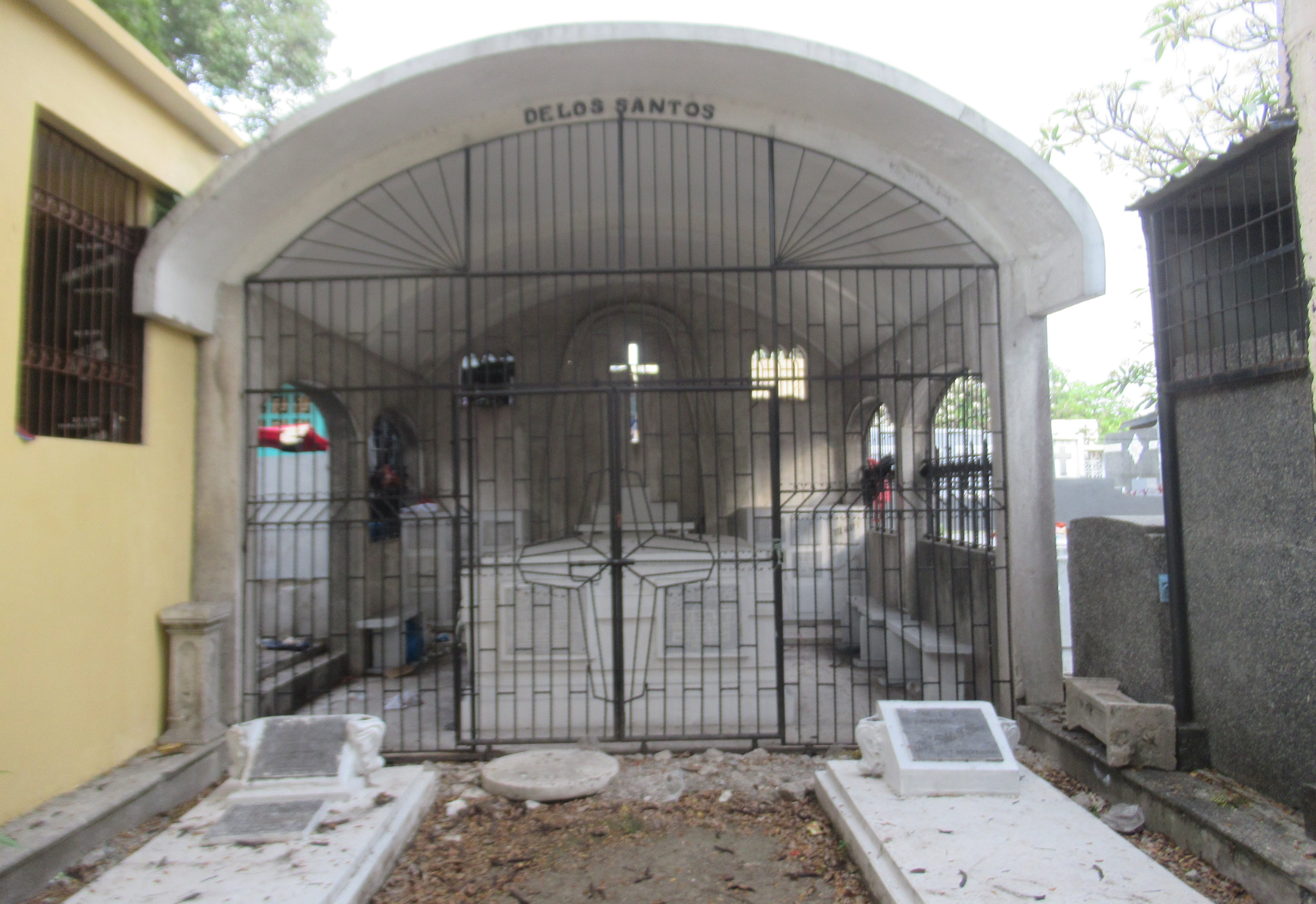
Mausoleum of de los Santos at the Manila North Cemetery

de los Santos died in office on April 18, 1928. Epifanio de los Santos Avenue (EDSA), the main road through Metro Manila, is named after him. Several schools, streets, a college, a hospital, a printing press and an auditorium in the National Library of the Philippines are also named in his honor.

== Bibliography ==
- CCP Encyclopedia of Philippine Art. Vol IX. Philippine Literature. Manila: Cultural Center of the Philippines, 1994
- Agoncillo, Teodoro A. 2002 ed. The revolt of the masses- the story of Bonifacio and the Katipunan. University of the Philippines Press. E. de los Santos St., UP Campus, Diliman, Quezon City.
- Epifanio de los Santos (Great among the great Filipino scholars). 1982. Printed by Merriam School & Office. Supplies Corporation, Manila.
- The Delos Santos family descendants memorabilia, historical pictures and clippings.
- Philippine Free Press. Manila. April 28, 1928.
- The Manila Tribune. April 19, 1928
- National Historical Institute (NHI). 1990. Filipinos in history. Vol. II. Manila.
- Bacallan, Joyce. 1988. Hero of the month- Epifanio delos Santos- a great Filipino academician. The youngster. p. 7.
- Bernardo, Fernando A. 2000. Silent storms: inspiring lives of 101 great Filipinos. Anvil Publishing, Inc. pp. 37–38. ISBN 978-971-27-0929-6
- Bantug, Jose P. Epifanio de los Santos Cristobal. pp. 215–223.
- Baylon, Gloria J. EDSA: Country's Avenue of History. The Philippine Post Nation: Leading to the Next Millennium. February 23, 1998.
- Buencamino, Felipe; De los Santos, Epifanio. Census of the Philippine Islands: taken under the direction of Philippine legislature in the year 1918. A Government Publication. Manila: Bureau Printing. (1921?)
- Carson, Taylor; De los Santos, Epifanio. 1927. History of the Philippine Press. Manila. 61 pp.
- Cayco, Librado D. (1934) Epifanio de los Santos Cristobal. Manila. National Heroes Day. University of the Philippines.
- Churchill, Bernadette R. Epifanio de los Santos, pioneer historian. In History & Culture, Language & Literature: Selected Essays of Teodoro A. Agoncillo. pp. 239–245.
- Cullinane, Michael. 2003. Illustrado politics: Filipino elite responses to American rule, 1989–1908. Ateneo de Manila University.
- De los Santos, Epifanio. 1909. Algo de prosa. Madrid Fortanet. 70 pp.
- De los Santos, Epifanio. 1909. Cinco notas al Capitulo octavo de los "Sucesos de las Islas Filipinas" del Dr. Antonio de Morga (en su nueva edición de W.E. Retana). Madrid Fortanet. 24 pp.
- De los Santos, Epifanio. 1909. Literatura tagala : Conferencia leída en el Liceo de Manila ante el "Samahan ng mananagálog". Madrid Fortanet.25 pp.
- De los Santos, Epifanio. 1911. Informe acerca de una obra sobre los orígenes de la imprenta filipina. Madrid Imprenta de Fortanet. 52 pp.
- De los Santos, Epifanio. 1913. Trinidad H. Pardo de Tavera. Cultura Filipina 4 (1): 1-49.
- De los Santos, Epifanio. 1913. Ignacio Villamor: El funcionario y el hombre. Cultura Filipina 4 (3): 351–359.
- De los Santos, Epifanio. 1915. Ignacio Villamor: El funcionario y el hombre. Cultura Filipina 5 (4): 275–294.
- De los Santos, Epifanio. 1916. Rafael del Pan: The Philippine Review 1 (May): 41–44.
- De los Santos, Epifanio.1957.Marcelo H. del Pilar; Andres Bonifacio; Emilio Jacinto. Kapisanang Pangkasaysayan ng Pilipinas. English and Tagalog. Translated from Spanish.
- De los Santos, Epifanio. 1973. The revolutionists: Aguinaldo, Bonifacio, Jacinto. Translated and edited by Teodoro A. Agoncillo. Manila: National Historical Commission.
- De los Santos, Epifanio. 1909. Epifanía Wenceslao E. Retana, ensayo crítico acerca de este ilustre filipinista. Establecimiento Tipográfico de Fortanet, Madrid.
- Dungo, Dolores T. Epifanio de los Santos. Epifanio de los Santos College, Malabon, Rizal.
- Espino, Licsi F. Jr. 1977. A Historian with style: love of learning chiseled the man. Archipelago: International Magazine of the Philippines 1:37-38. ISSN 0303-8564
- Fermin, Jose D. 2004. 1904 World's Fair: the Filipino experience. E. de los Santos St., UP Campus, Diliman Quezon City. p. 73. ISBN 978-971-542-439-4
- Gwekoh, Sol H. Biographical Sketch: Epifanio de los Santos. Variety. p 13.
- Hardtendorp, A. V. H. Don Pañong – genius. Philippine Magazine 26 (Sept.) 210–11, 234–235.
- Hernandez, Vicente S. 1996. History of books and libraries in the Philippines 1521-1900: A study of the sources and chronology of events pertaining to Philippine library history from the sixteenth to the end of the nineteenth century. National Commission for Culture and the Arts, Manila.
- Mella, Cesar. 1974. Directory of Filipino Writers: Past and Present. Manila. CTM enterprises.
- Mojares, Resil B. 2006. Brains of the nation: Pedro Paterno, T.H. Pardo de Tavera, Isabelo de los Reyes and the production of modern knowledge. Ateneo de Manila University Press. Bellarmine Hall, Katipunan Avenue Loyola Heights, Quezon City. p. 477. ISBN 971-550-496-5
- Nieva, Gregorio, ed. 1880- Manila, P.I.: G. Nieva [etc.]. 2005. The Philippine review (Revista filipina) [Vol. 2, no. 1]. More about Jose Rizal by Epifanio de los Santos. Ann Arbor, Michigan: University of Michigan Library. p. 22.
- Palma, Rafael. 1930. Epifanio de los Santos Cristobal.(English translation by Tiburcio Tumaneng from the Spanish Original). Manila. 14 pp.
- Qurino, Carlos. 1995. Who's who in the Philippine history. Manila. Tahanan Books.
- San Juan, E. Jr. Social Consciousness and Revolt in Modern Philippine Poetry. pp. 394–399.
- Santos, Ramon Pagayon. 2007. Tunugan: four essays on Filipino Music. The University of The Philippines Press. 216 pp.
- Villareal, Hector K. et al. 1965. Eminent Filipinos. Manila: National Historical Commission.
- Zaide, Gregorio F. 1930. Epifanio de los Santos, his collection and library. The Tribune Magazine. pp. 4–5
- Zaide, Gregorio F. 1965. Epifanio de los Santos: Great among the great Filipino scholars. In Great Filipinos in history. 88: 575–581.

Political offices
Preceded by Felino Cajucom	Governor of Nueva Ecija; 1902–1906	Succeeded by Isauro Gabaldon
Government offices
Preceded by Trinidad Pardo de Tavera	Director of the Philippine Library and Museum; 1925–1928	Succeeded by Teodoro M. Kalaw as Director of the National Library of the Philippines
