= José Turiano Santiago =

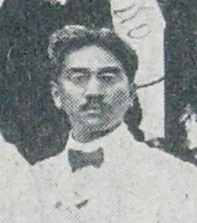
- Santiago in 1903

Member of the Malolos Congress from Nueva Ecija
- In office September 15, 1898 – November 13, 1899 Serving with Epifanio de los Santos and Gregorio Macapinlac

Personal details
- Born: José Turiano Santiago y Acosta; July 13, 1875 Tondo, Manila, Captaincy General of the Philippines
- Died: circa 1942 (aged 66–67) Unknown
- Party: Nacionalista (c. 1908)
- Spouse: Marina Dizon (m. 1894)
- Education: University of Santo Tomas
- Profession: Accountant

Military service
- Allegiance: Katipunan
- Years of service: 1893–1895

José Turiano Santiago y Acosta (July 13, 1875 – c. 1942) was a Filipino patriot who was among the leaders of the Katipunan that sparked the Philippine Revolution against Spain in 1896.

== Biography ==
Santiago graduated from the University of Santo Tomas and was a practicing accountant.

Santiago joined the Katipunan in 1893 and was among those tasked to organize popular councils in key areas in Manila and its environs. He was elected secretary of the secret society's second Supreme Council under the presidency of Roman Basa. It was at this time that he met Marina Dizon, daughter of Katipunan founder José Dizon and member of the Katipunan's women's auxiliary.

In the same year, Santiago and Marina, who was already his fiancée, witnessed the wedding of Andrés Bonifacio to Gregoria de Jesús. The wedding sponsors were Santiago's half-brother and fellow Katipunan member Restituto Javier and his wife. Santiago himself married Marina Dizon on September 16, 1894 at the Binondo Church in Manila. They would eventually have eight children.

The following year, Santiago was elected secretary of the secret society but he and his half-brother Restituto Javier were accused of betraying the secret society because a priest-professor of the University of Santo Tomas got hold of a coded message of the Katipunan. Since the priest was a friend of Javier's sister, the Katipunan suspected that Santiago and Javier revealed the society's existence and the two were expelled although they were never proven guilty.

The Katipunan would not be uncovered until August 1896 and neither Santiago nor Javier had anything to do with it. Santiago and his wife fled their house during that time with Marina burning documents related to the Katipunan. Nonetheless, the half-brothers were among those who were arrested by the Spanish authorities and detained for months. Santiago's father-in-law was also arrested and executed. Javier was later banished to the Canary Islands. Santiago, however, was released on September 11, 1897.

But he remained in contact with revolutionary forces and became a delegate of Nueva Ecija to the Malolos Congress in 1898. When the Americans took Manila, Santiago and his wife tried to live normal lives in Meycauayan, Bulacan but had to flee to Tarlac in the course of the Philippine–American War. The couple tried to settle down in Manila anew but Santiago was later exposed as an insurgent and he had to flee to Hong Kong.

When peace restored in the Philippines, Santiago returned and lived a normal life as an accountant and auditor for several companies in Manila. On July 6, 1908, Santiago was nominated by the Nacionalista Party to run for the vacant Philippine Assembly seat representing the 1st district of Manila, but lost in the following special election in the same year to Justo Lukban.

He died during the Japanese Occupation.
