= Captaincy General of the Philippines =

1565–1899 Spanish possession in Southeast Asia

Captaincy General of the Philippines: Capitanía General de Filipinas (Spanish); Kapitaniya Heneral ng Pilipinas (Tagalog)
- 1565–1899
- Flag Coat of arms
- Motto: Plus Ultra "Further Beyond"
- Anthem: Marcha Real (1770–1899) "Royal March"
- Lesser coat of arms

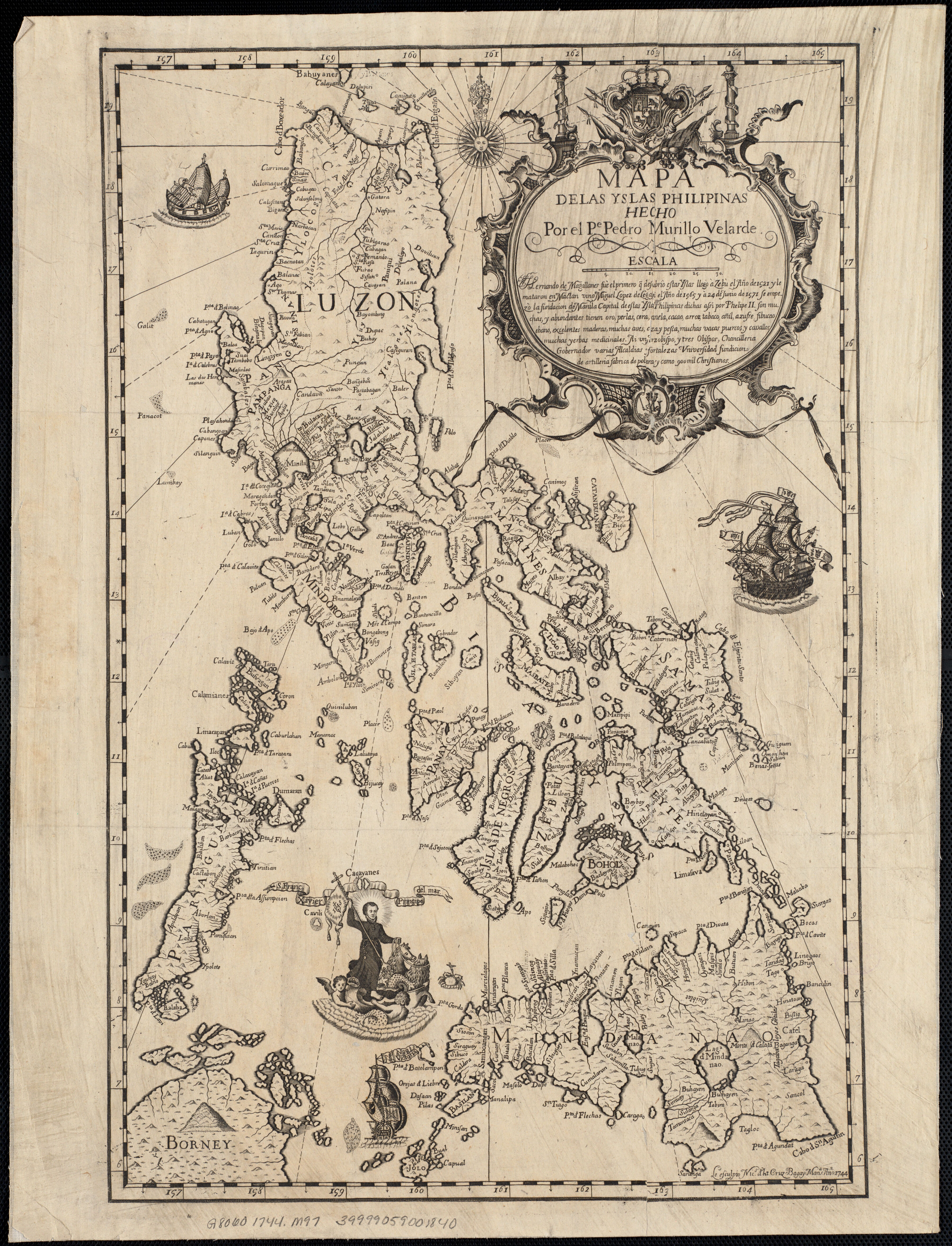
- Status: Captaincy General of the Spanish Empire: Territory of the Viceroyalty of New Spain (1565–1821)
- Capital: Cebu City (1565–1569); Manila (1571–1898); Iloilo City (1898)
- Official languages: Spanish
- Common languages: Philippine languages Micronesian languages Hokkien; Other immigrant languages
- Religion: Roman Catholicism (state religion); Islam; Philippine Traditional Religion
- Government: Unitary absolute Monarchy
- King
  - 1565–1598 (first): Philip II
  - 1886–1899 (last): Alfonso XIII
- Governor-General
  - 1565–1572 (first): Miguel López de Legazpi
  - 1899 (last): Diego de los Ríos
- Legislature: Cortes Generales
- History
  - Spanish conquest: 27 April 1565
  - Dutch invasion: 15 March 1646
  - British invasion: 24 September 1762
  - Cavite Mutiny: 20 January 1872
  - Philippine Revolution: 23 August 1896
  - Declaration of Independence: 12 June 1898
  - Battle of Manila: 13 August 1898
  - United States annexation of the Philippines and Guam: 10 December 1898
  - Philippine–American War breaks out: 4 February 1899
  - Withdrawal of Spanish forces: 3 June 1899

Population
  - 1896 estimate: 6,261,339
- Currency: Spanish dollar Spanish peseta
- Time zone: 16 to 12 hours behind GMT (27 April 1565–30 December 1844) 8 to 12 hours ahead of GMT (1 January 1845 onwards)
- ISO 3166 code: PH
Preceded by	Succeeded by
Precolonial barangays	Military Government of the Philippine Islands; Dictatorial Government of the Philippines
- Today part of: Philippines

The Captaincy General of the Philippines (Note: Spanish: Capitanía General de Filipinas Spanish pronunciation: [kapitaˈni.a xeneˈɾal de filiˈpinas]; Tagalog: Kapitaniya Heneral ng Pilipinas) was an administrative district of the Spanish Empire in Southeast Asia governed by a governor-general as a dependency of the Viceroyalty of New Spain based in Mexico City until Mexican independence when it was transferred directly to Madrid.

Also known as the Captaincy General of the Spanish East Indies, which included among others the Philippine Islands, the Mariana Islands, and the Caroline Islands. It was founded in 1565 with the first permanent Spanish forts.

For centuries, all the administrative, political and economic aspects of the Captaincy General were administered in Mexico City by the Viceroyalty of New Spain for the Spanish Crown. However, in 1821, following the independence of the Mexican Empire, all control was transferred to Madrid. It was succeeded by the short-lived First Philippine Republic following its independence through the Philippine Revolution.

== History ==
=== Early explorations ===
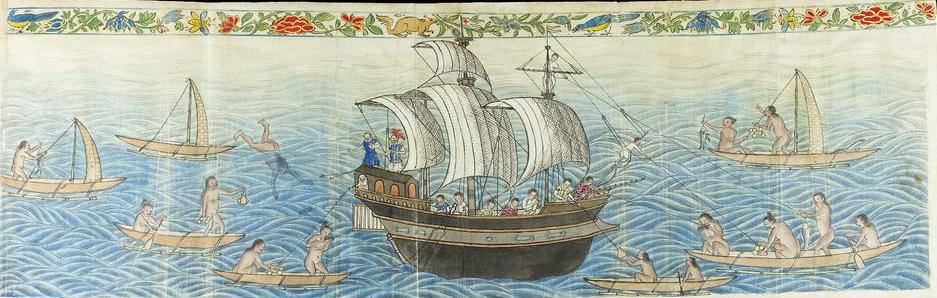
Reception of the Manila Galleon by the Chamorro in the Ladrones Islands, ca. 1590 Boxer Codex

After a long, tolling voyage across the Pacific Ocean, Ferdinand Magellan reached the island of Guam on 6 March 1521 and anchored the three ships that were left of his fleet in Umatac Bay, before proceeding to the Philippines, where he met his death during the Battle of Mactan. Antonio Pigafetta, the expedition's chronicler and one of only 18 original crew members to survive Ferdinand Magellan's circumnavigation of the globe, recorded all details of the voyage.

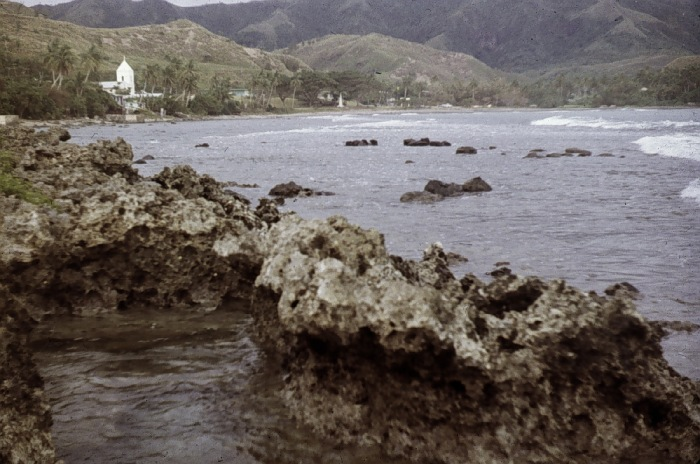
Magellan landing site in Umatac Bay

Miguel López de Legazpi arrived in Umatac in 1565 and claimed the island of Guam for Spain, before proceeding to the Philippines, where, in a short period of time, they successfully incorporated into Spain's empire Cebu, Samar, Mazaua, Leyte, and Bohol, before conquering Manila.

Later (in 1569), Miguel López de Legazpi transferred the Spanish headquarters from Cebu to Panay, where they found allies, who were never conquered by Spain but were accomplished as vassals by means of pacts, peace treaties, and reciprocal alliances. On 5 June 1569, Guido de Lavezaris, the royal treasurer in the archipelago, wrote to Philip II reporting about the Portuguese attack on Cebu in the preceding autumn. A letter from another official, Andres de Mirandaola (dated three days later, on 8 June), also described briefly this encounter with the Portuguese. The danger of another attack led the Spaniards to remove their camp from Cebu to Panay, which they considered a safer place. Legazpi himself, in his report to the Viceroy in New Spain (dated 1 July 1569), mentioned the same reason for the relocation of Spaniards to Panay. It was in Panay that the conquest of Luzon was planned, and launched on 8 May 1570. Two of Lepazpi's lieutenant-commanders, Martín de Goiti and Juan de Salcedo, conquered Luzon's northern region.

Several Pacific islands were claimed by Spain during the 16th century, including the Caroline Islands by Toribio Alonso de Salazar in 1526, Palau by Ruy López de Villalobos in 1543, Bonin Islands by Bernardo de la Torre in 1543, New Guinea by Yñigo Ortiz de Retez in 1545, Solomon Islands by Pedro Sarmiento de Gamboa in 1568, New Hebrides by Pedro Fernandes de Queirós in 1606, and Marquesas Islands by Álvaro de Mendaña de Neira in 1595, although Spain did not make any serious attempt to establish permanent settlements in them until the 18th century.

=== Spanish settlement and creation of the Captaincy General ===
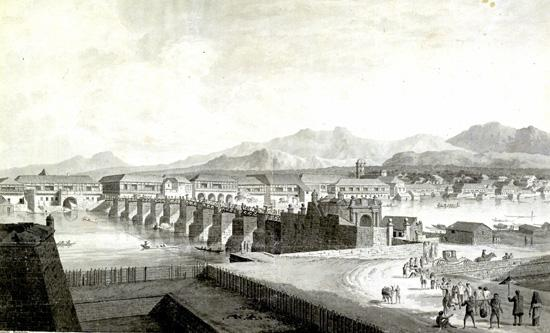
Puente de Grande 1794

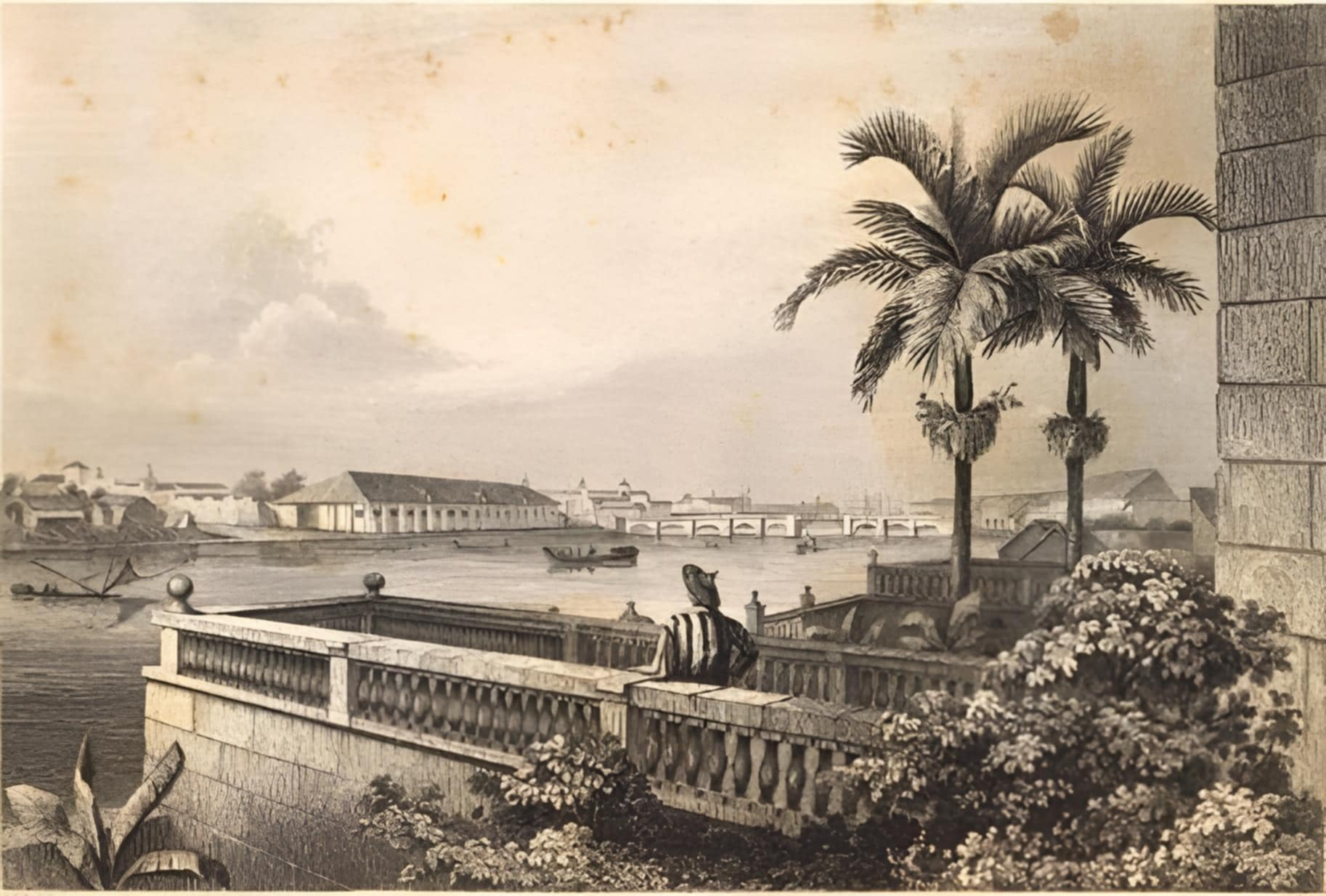
Pasig River, Manila

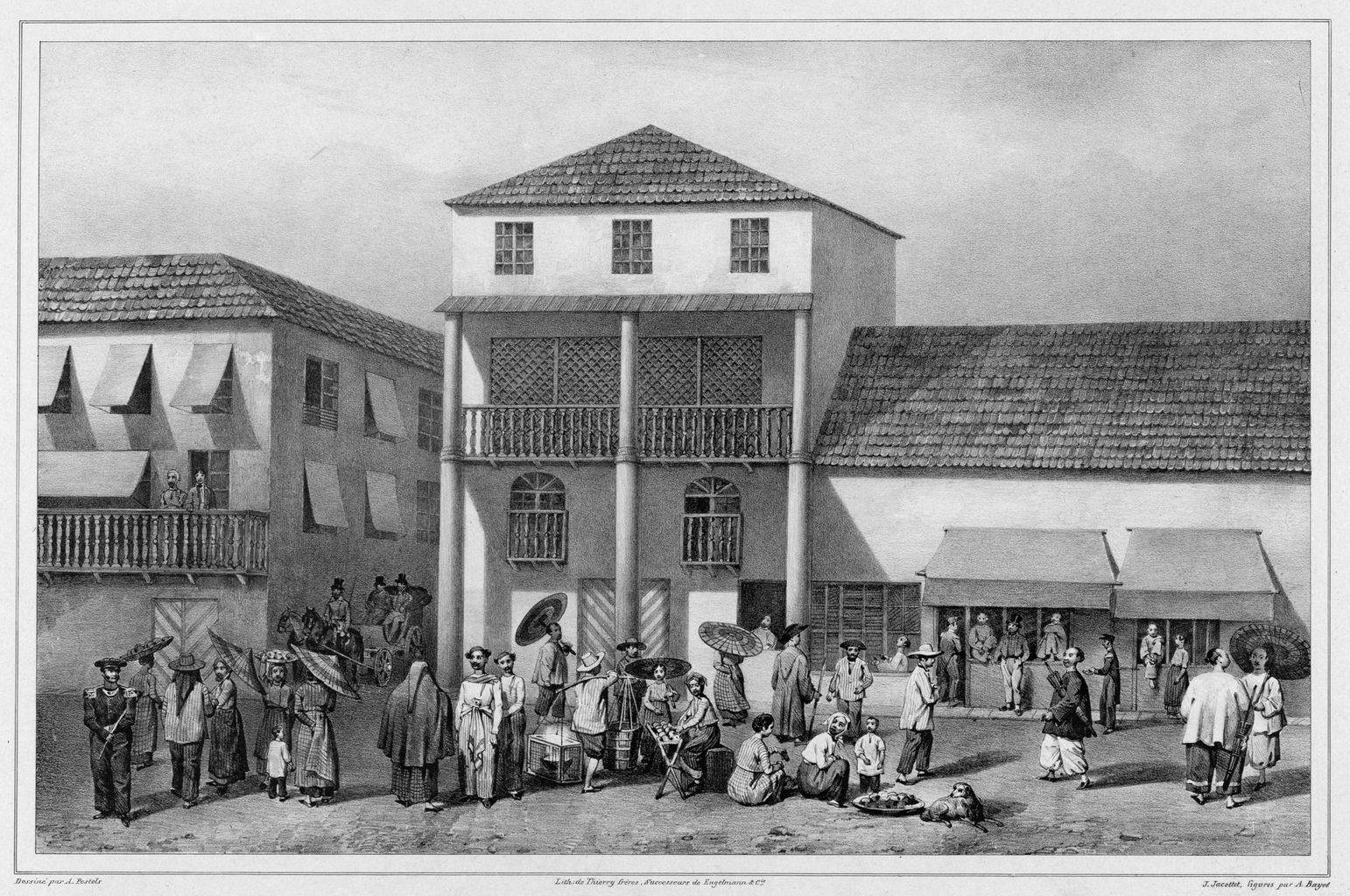
Colonial Manila, c. 1826

In 1574, the Captaincy General of the Philippines was created as a dependency of the Viceroyalty of New Spain. In 1584, the Real Audiencia of Manila was established by King Felipe II, who appointed as its president the same governor of the Captaincy General of the Philippines. The Captaincy General, as an autonomous kingdom, had its capital in Cebu from 1565 to 1595, and in Manila from 1595 until 1898.

As part of the extensive governmental reforms during the early Bourbon period throughout the overseas possessions, an Intendencia was established in Manila by Royal Decree of 17 July 1784 that handled issues regarding the government finances and to promote the economy. Ciriaco González Carbajal was appointed as Oidor of the Audiencia of Manila and was instructed to abide by the Royal Ordinance of Mayors of 1782, that had been enacted in Rio de la Plata. Carbajal proposed the establishment of more Intendencias in Ilocos, Camarines, Iloilo, and Cebu, and although they were created on 24 November 1786, they were later abolished by the Royal Decree of 20 November 1787. A month earlier, on 23 October, the Intendencia of Manila had been attached to the Captaincy General of the Philippines.

Until 1822, all General Captains were civilians, but after that year they were always chosen among the military. Throughout the second half of the 19th century, there were established many dependent local government offices and military settlements, very numerous due to a large number of islands and the extent of the districts.

== Government ==
Spanish Colonial Bureaucracy
Level of government	Headed by	Description
Spanish Empire	Monarch of Spain	Civil and Spiritual Authority (through Royal Patronage)
Spanish Empire	Council of Indies	Composed of 6 to 10 appointed royal councilors; Governed all the Spanish colonies in the King's name, and had legislative power; Served as the court of appeals for the colonies
Viceroyalty of New Spain (abolished after Mexico gained independence in 1821)	Viceroy of New Spain	Governed New Spain on the King's behalf
Central Government in Manila	Captain General	Initially exercised executive (as Governor), legislative, judicial (as President of the Audiencia), military (as Captain General), and ecclesiastical (as Vice Patron) powers; By 1821 or 1875, the office became Governor General; Appointed by the King with the advice of the council and probably the Viceroy prior to 1821; Balanced by the Audiencia
Central Government in Manila	Archbishop of Manila	Had full spiritual authority over the army and navy as military Vicar General of the islands; Advised the Captain General, especially in matters concerning the governance and provisioning of the Church in the Philippines; Ecclesiastical governor of the islands' suffragan dioceses, headed by bishops.; Appointed dignitaries or the staff of a diocese, if the captain general failed to do so
Central Government in Manila	Real Audiencia de Manila	Functioned as the Supreme Court and advised the Captain General; Initially composed of four judges (oidores), an attorney-general (fiscal), and a constable, with attached advocates for the accused, a defender of the naturales ("natives"), and other minor officials; the number of oidores and fiscales would be increased after; Took charge of government upon the death of the governor (mayor) up to the arrival of his successor
Local government
Provincia/Alcaldía Mayor	Bishops of Suffragan Dioceses	
Provincia/Alcaldía Mayor	Alcalde Mayor (for Provinces)	Exercised executive and judiciary powers in the province; Collected tribute; Until the mid-19th century, he had the privilege to engage in trade (indulto de comercio), which occasioned many abuses against the local population; No provision was made restricting the alcalde mayor to engage in trade
Provincia/Alcaldía Mayor	Corregidor (for Districts)	If a provincia was large, the alcalde mayor had a corregidor to administer over corregimientos (provincial district); Exercised executive and judiciary power
Provincia/Alcaldía Mayor	Junta Provincial (1893–1898)	Provincial council which assisted the alcalde mayor; Composed of a public prosecutor, finance administrator, treasurer, vicars forane, provincial doctor, and four principles of the capital elected by the capitanes municipales of the province
Pueblo/Municipio	Gobernadorcillo	Administered over a pueblo, assisted by other pueblo officials; Position was initially restricted to the local married men of the elite (principalia); By late 1700s, the position became elective. However, only members of the principalía could vote and be elected, making it a quasi-hereditary position, often rotating among a few families.
Pueblo/Municipio	Capitan Municipal (1893–1898)	Equivalent of the pre-Maura Law gobernadorcillo; Head of the tribunal municipal; Elected by the residents of the municipio
Pueblo/Municipio	Tribunal Municipal (1893–1898)	Municipal council composed of the municipal captain, the chief lieutenant, the lieutenant of police, the lieutenant of fields and the lieutenant of livestock, all of which were elected by the residents of the municipio
Barangay	Cabeza de Barangay	Administered over a barangay of 40 to 50 families; Collected tribute in the barangay; Position was originally hereditary among the local elites of the pre-colonial period; Position was made elective in 1786; the gobernadorcillo and other cabezas chose a name and presented it to the Governor General for appointment to the position in a specific barangay.; After three years of service, a cabeza was qualified for election to the office of the gobernadorcillo.

=== Political system ===
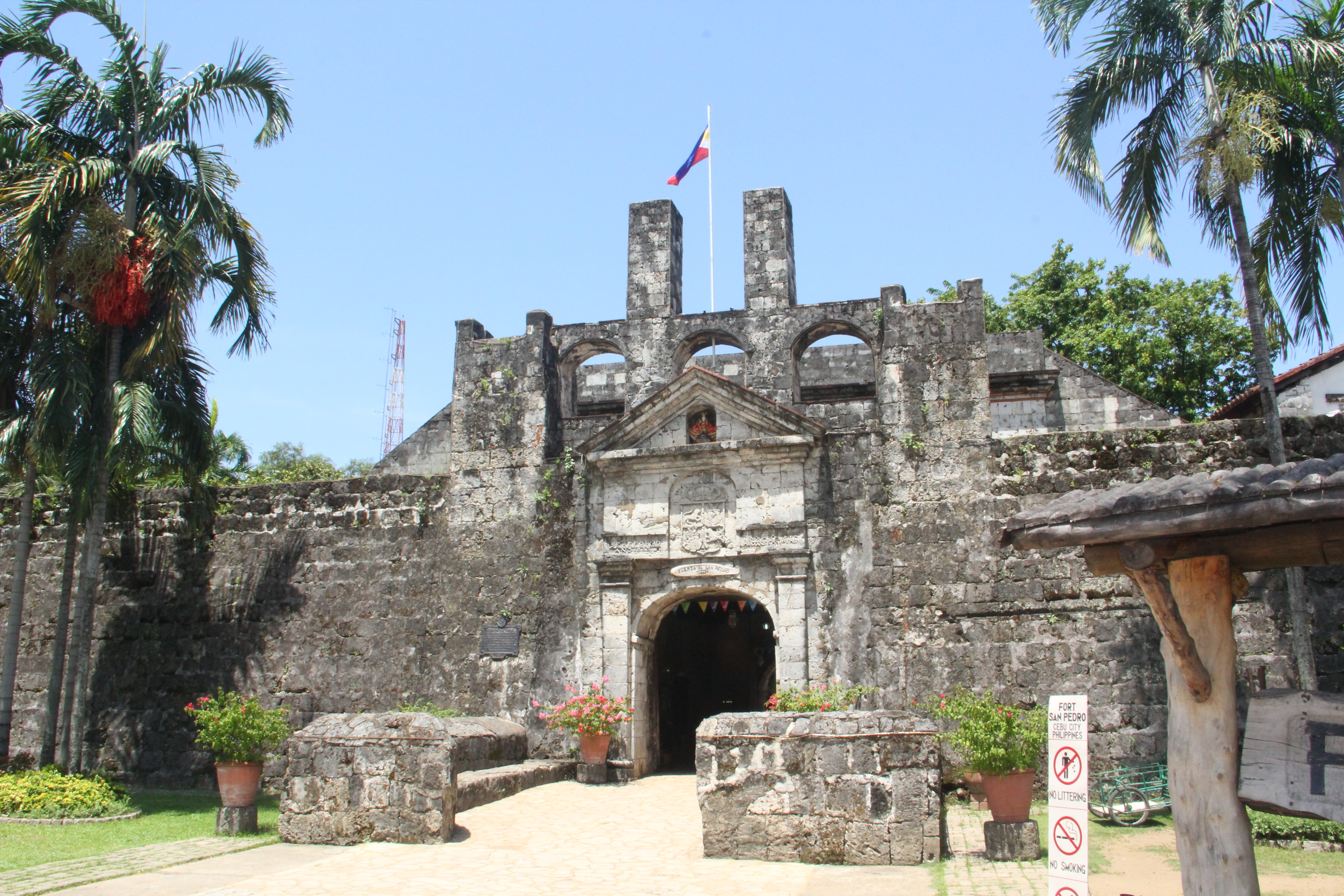
Fort San Pedro was first of many fortresses to protect the islands from invaders such as pirates and other colonizers.

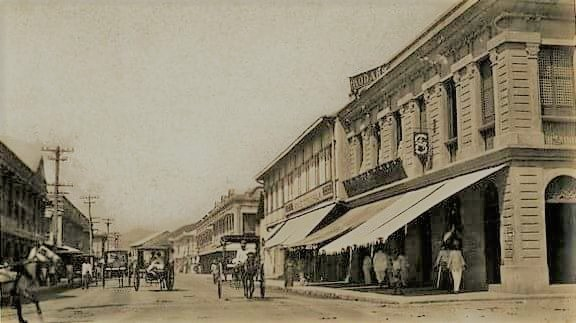
Old view of a street in Cebu

The Spanish quickly organized their new colony according to their model. The first task was the reduction, or relocation of indigenous Filipinos into settlements. The earliest political system used during the conquista period was the encomienda system, which resembled the feudal system in medieval Europe. The conquistadores, friars and native nobles were granted estates, in exchange for their services to the King, and were given the privilege to collect tribute from its inhabitants. In return, the person granted the encomienda, known as an encomendero, was tasked to provide military protection to the inhabitants, justice and governance. In times of war, the encomendero was duty bound to provide soldiers for the King, in particular, for the complete defense of the colony from potential invasions of outside powers such as the Dutch, British, and Chinese. The encomienda system was abused by encomenderos and by 1700 was largely replaced by administrative provinces, each headed by an alcalde mayor (provincial governor). The most prominent feature of Spanish cities was the plaza, a central area for town activities such as the fiesta, and where government buildings, the church, a market area and other infrastructures were located. Residential areas lay around the plaza. During the conquista, the first task of colonization was the reduction, or relocation of the indigenous population into settlements surrounding the plaza.

==== National government ====
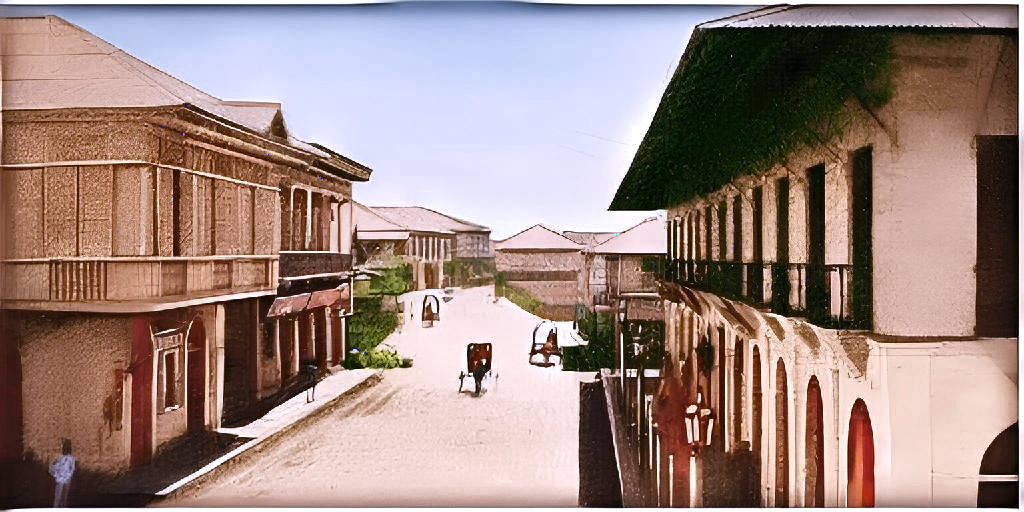
Calle Real, Iloilo City

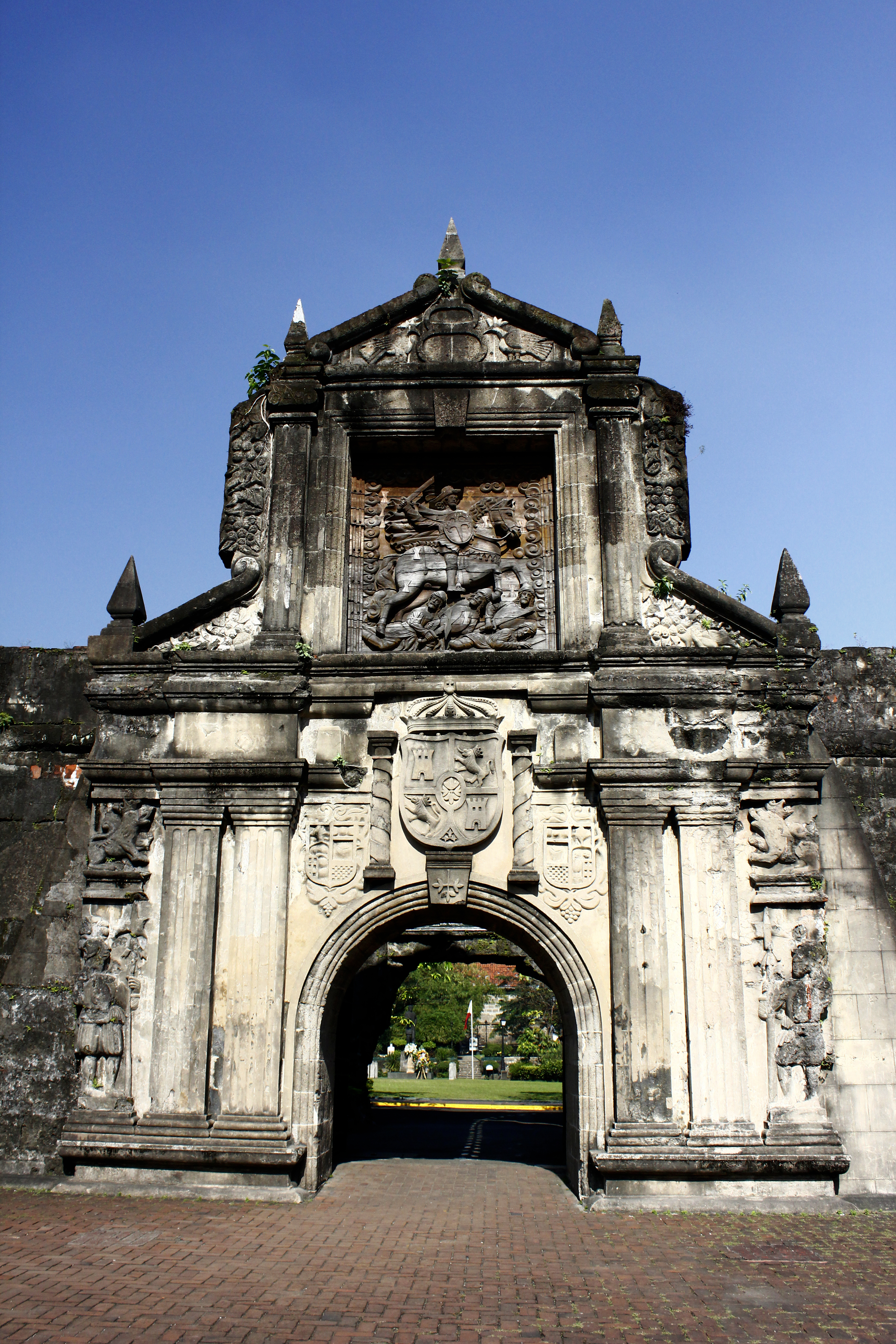
Fort Santiago, part of Intramuros, Manila

On the national level or social class, the King of Spain, via his Council of the Indies (Consejo de las Indias), governed through his representative in the Philippines, the Governor-General of the Philippines (Gobernador y Capitán General). With the seat of power in Intramuros, Manila, the Governor-General was given several duties: head of the supreme court, the Royal Audiencia of Manila; Commander-in-chief of the army and navy, and the economic planner of the country. All executive power of the local government stemmed from him and as regal patron, he had the authority to supervise mission work and oversee ecclesiastical appointments. His yearly salary was 40,000 pesos. The Governor-General was commonly a peninsular Spaniard, a Spaniard born in Spain, to ensure loyalty of the colony to the crown.

==== Provincial government ====
On the local level, heading the pacified provinces (alcaldías), was the provincial governor (alcalde mayor). The unpacified military zones (corregimiento), such as Mariveles and Mindoro, were headed by the corregidores. City governments (ayuntamientos), were also headed by an alcalde mayor. Alcaldes mayores and corregidores exercised multiple prerogatives as judge, inspector of encomiendas, chief of police, tribute collector, capitan-general of the province, and even vice-regal patron. Their annual salary ranged from P300 to P2000 before 1847 and P1500 to P1600 after 1847. This could be augmented through the special privilege of "indulto de commercio" where all people were forced to do business with him. The alcalde mayor was usually an Insular (Spaniard born in the Philippines). In the 19th century, the Peninsulares began to displace the Insulares, which resulted in the political unrests of 1872, notably the 1872 Cavite mutiny and the Gomburza executions.

==== Municipal government ====
The pueblo or town was headed by the Gobernadorcillo or little governor. Among his administrative duties were the preparation of the tribute list (padron), recruitment and distribution of men for draft labor, communal public work and military conscription (quinto), postal clerk and judge in minor civil suits. He intervened in all administrative cases pertaining to his town: lands, justice, finance and the municipal police. His annual salary, however, was only P24 but he was exempted from taxation. Any native or Chinese mestizo, who is a member of the principalía, is 25 years old, proficient in oral or written Spanish and has been a cabeza de barangay of 4 years can be a gobernadorcillo.

Any member of the Principalía, who speaks or who has knowledge of the Spanish language and has been a Cabeza de Barangay of 4 years can be a Gobernadorcillo. Among those prominent is Emilio Aguinaldo, a chinese mestizo, and who was the Gobernadorcillo of Cavite El Viejo (now Kawit). The officials of the pueblo were proficient. taken from the Principalía, the noble class of pre-colonial origin. Their names are survived by prominent families in contemporary Philippine society such as Duremdes, Lindo, Apalisok, Tupas, Gatmaitan, Liwanag, Mallillin, Pangilinan, Panganiban, Balderas, Zabarte and Agbayani,Aguinaldo to name a few.

==== Barrio government ====
Every barangay was further divided into "barrios", and the barrio government (village or district) rested on the barrio administrator (cabeza de barangay). He was responsible for peace and order, recruited men for communal public works, and collecting the barrio's taxes. Cabezas should be literate in Spanish and have good moral character and property. Cabezas who served for 25 years were exempted from forced labor.

In addition, this is where the sentiment heard as, "Mi Barrio", first came from.

==== The Residencia and the Visita ====
To check the abuse of power of royal officials, two ancient Castilian institutions were brought to the Philippines: the Residencia, dating back to the 5th century, and the Visita, which differed from the residencia in that it was conducted clandestinely by a visitador-general sent from Spain and might occur anytime within the official's term, without any previous notice. Visitas could be specific or general.

==== Maura law ====
The legal foundation for municipal governments in the country was laid with the promulgation of the Maura Law on 19 May 1893. Named after its author, Don Antonio Maura, the Spanish Minister of Colonies at the time, the law reorganized town governments in the Philippines with the aim of making them more effective and autonomous. This law created the municipal organization that was later adopted, revised, and further strengthened by the American and Filipino governments that succeeded Spanish.

== Territorial divisions ==
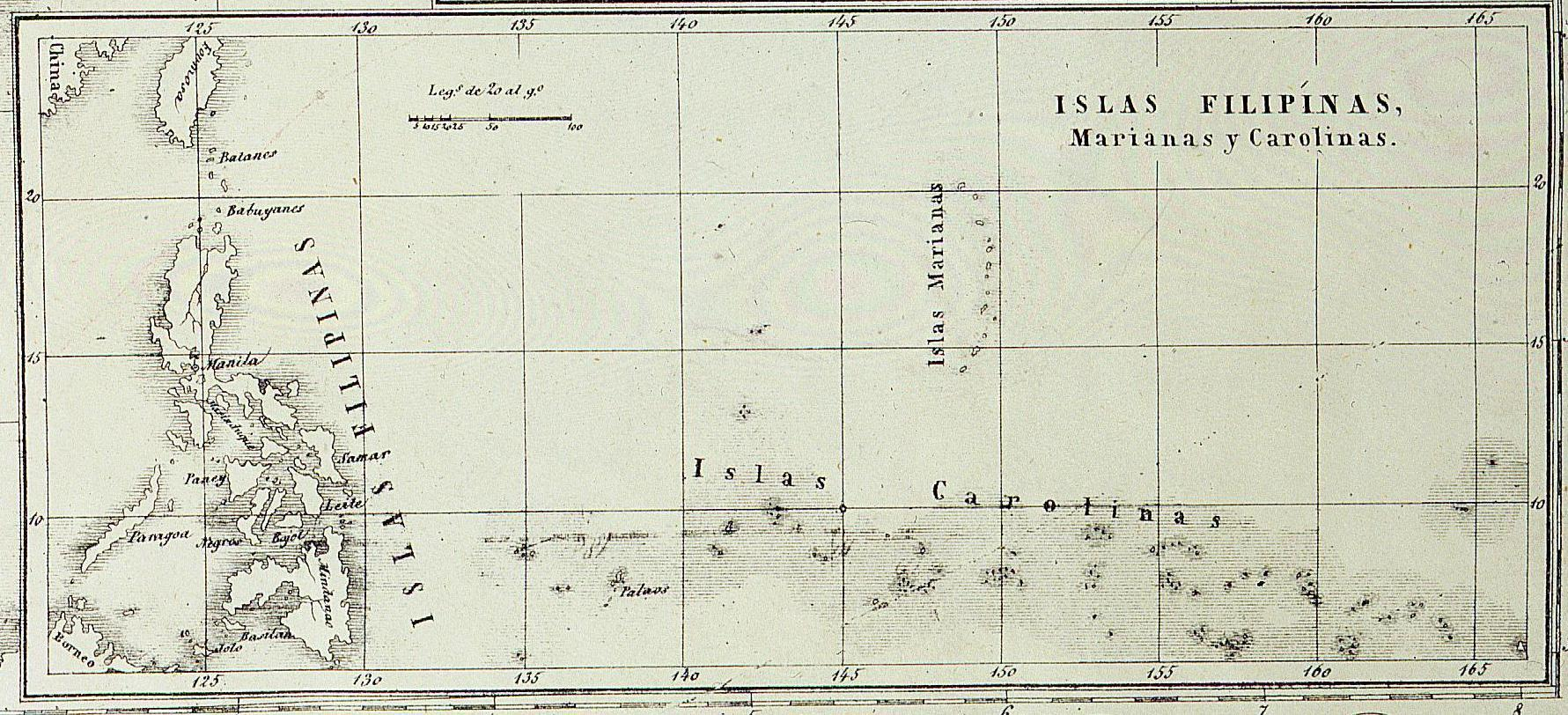
Spanish overseas possessions in the Pacific (1858)

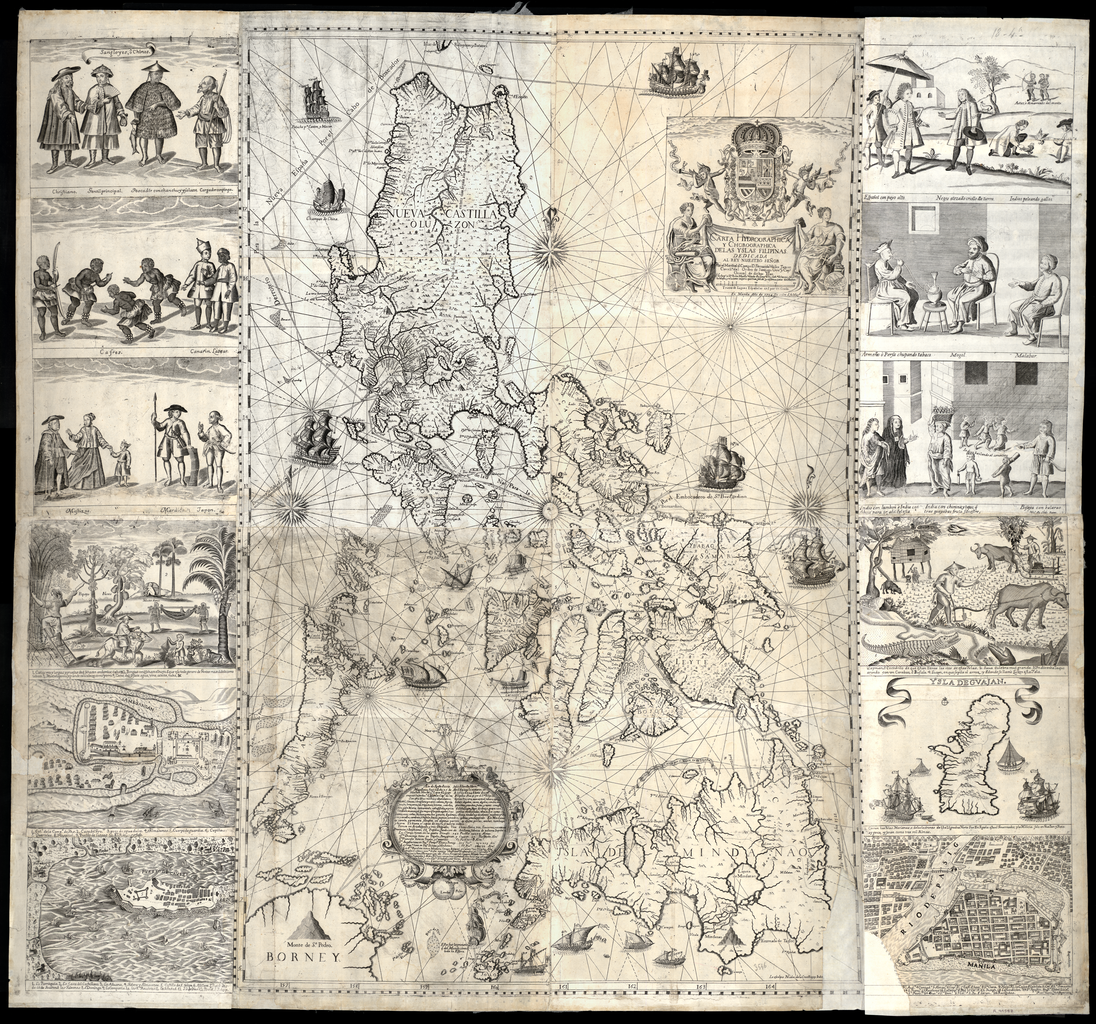
The Velarde map (Carta Hydrographica y Chorographica de las Yslas Filipinas Dedicada al Rey Nuestro Señor por el Mariscal d. Campo D. Fernando Valdes Tamon Cavallº del Orden de Santiago de Govor. Y Capn) (Manila, 1734)

Until the second half of the 18th century, there were 24 provinces, 19 alcaldías mayores and five corregimientos:

=== Corregimientos ===
- Mariveles
- Cavite
- Zamboanga
- Mindanao Moro
- Ogtong (Oton)

=== Alcaldías mayores ===
- Albay
- Camarines (later partitioned)
- Cagayán (later partitioned)
- Ilocos (later partitioned)
- Pangasinán (later partitioned)
- Pampanga (later partitioned)
- Bulacan (separated from Pampanga in 1578)
- Tondo
- Laguna (later partitioned)
- Balayán
- Tayabas (separated from Laguna in 1754)
- Leyte
- Panay
- Caraga
- Negros
- Calamianes
- Mindoro
- Marianas
- Cebú

=== Other administrative units established afterward ===
- Zambales (separated from Pangasinán in 1578)
- Bataan (separated from Mariveles and from Pampanga in 1754)
- Nueva Écija (separated from Pampanga in 1801)
- Nueva Vizcaya (separated from Cagayán in 1839)
- Ilocos Norte (divided in two from Ilocos in 1818)
- Ilocos Sur (divided in two from Ilocos in 1818)
- Camarines Norte (divided in two from Camarines in 1829)
- Camarines Sur (divided in two from Camarines in 1829)
- Samar (separated from Leite)
- Misamis (separated from Mindanao Moro and from Cebú)
- Iloílo (separated from Panay)
- Antique (separated from Panay)
- Abra (separated from Ilocos Sur in 1846)
- Nueva Guipúzcoa (separated from Caraga in 1847)
- Ticao and Masbate (separated from Albay in 1846)
- La Unión (separated from Pangasinán and Ilocos Sur in 1850)
- Tarlac (separated from Pampanga and Pangasinán in 1873)
- Isabela (separated from Cagayán & Nueva Vizcaya in 1856)
- Lower territories of Agno (Military outposts)

=== Military districts ===
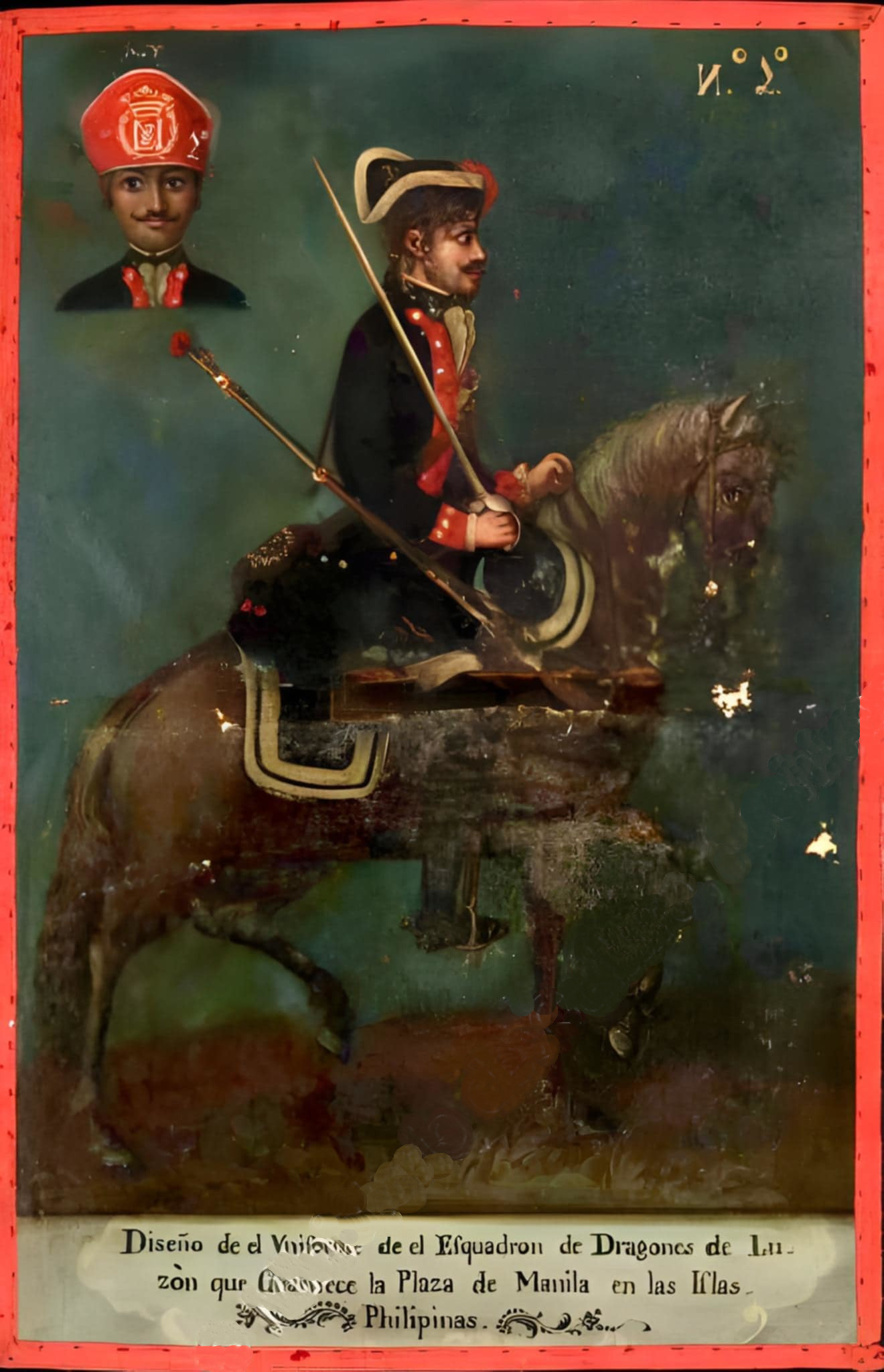
Painting of a Filipino dragoon from the Luzon Squadron riding on horseback and wearing a jacket, waistcoat and breeches, with a red lapel and turn-up, 1786

- Romblon (formed from Capiz in 1853)
- El Príncipe (formed from Nueva Écija in 1856)
- Binangonan de Lampon (separated from Tayabas and transferred to Nueva Écija in 1803 and to Laguna in 1856)
- Morong (separated from Tondo and Laguna in 1853)

=== Established during the 19th century ===
Administrative divisions of the Philippine Archipelago, 1898

Until the second half of the 19th century, there existed the administrative units:

- Luzon Island (21 administrative units): Tondo, Bulacán, Pampanga, Zambales, Bataan, Nueva Écija, La Unión, Cavite, Laguna, Batangas, Pangasinan, Ilocos Norte, Ilocos Sur, Tayabas, Abra, Cagayán (including Babuyan Islands), Isabela, Nueva Vizcaya, Albay, Camarines Norte, Camarines Sur.
- Mindoro, Marinduque, Luban, Ilin (one administrative unit): Mindoro.
- Batán (one administrative unit): Batanes.
- Panay Island (three administrative units): Cápiz, Iloilo, Antique.
- Negros (one administrative unit): Negros.
- Samar (one administrative unit): Samar.
- Leite (one administrative unit): Leite.
- Calamianes (one administrative unit): Calamianes.
- Cebú (one administrative unit): Cebú.
- Mindanao (four administrative units): Caraga, Misamis, Zamboanga, Nueva Guipúzcoa.
- Sultanate of Sulu
- Joló
- Spratly Islands
- Special Districts (four): Benguet, Ticao and Masbate, Comandancia del Corregidor, Lower territories of Agno.

Spanish rule in the Philippines ceased in 1898 after the war with the United States, which annexed most territories, although the administrative jurisdictions remained intact.

Most of the remaining territories in the Pacific Ocean were sold to Germany during the German-Spanish Treaty of 1899.

== Economy ==
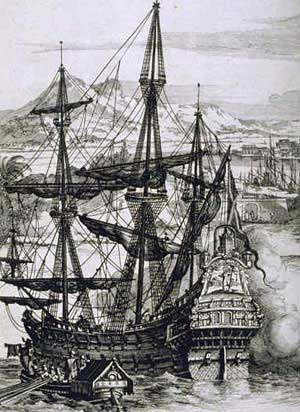
A sketch of a Manila galleon used during the Manila-Acapulco trade

=== Manila-Acapulco galleon trade ===
Manila was the western hub of the trans-Pacific trade. Manila galleons were constructed in Bicol and Cavite. Trade between Spain and the Philippines was via the Pacific Ocean to Mexico (Manila to Acapulco), and then across the Caribbean Sea and Atlantic Ocean to Spain (Veracruz to Cádiz). Manila became a major center of trade in Asia between the 17th and 18th centuries. All sorts of products from China, Japan, Brunei, the Maluku Islands, and even India were sent to Manila to be sold for silver 8-real coins which came aboard the galleons from Acapulco. These goods, including silk, porcelain, spices, lacquerware, and textile products were then sent to Acapulco and from there to other parts of New Spain, Peru, and Europe.

The Manila-Acapulco galleon trade was the main source of income for the colony during its early years. Service was inaugurated in 1565 and continued into the early 19th century. The galleon trade brought silver from New Spain, which was used to purchase Asian goods such as silk from China, spices from the Moluccas, lacquerware from Japan, and Philippine cotton textiles. These goods were then exported to New Spain and ultimately Europe by way of Manila. Thus, the Philippines earned its income through the trade of the Manila-Acapulco galleons. To Spain, the galleon trade was the link that bound the Philippines to her.

While the trade did bring some results which were beneficial to the Philippines, most effects were disadvantageous. However, the trade did result in cultural and commercial exchanges between Asia and the Americas that led to the introduction of new crops and animals to the Philippines such as tomatoes, avocado, guava, papaya, pineapple, and horses. These gave the colony its first real income. The trade lasted for over two hundred years, and ceased in 1815 just before the secession of American colonies from Spain.

=== Royal Society of Friends of the Country ===
José de Basco y Vargas, following a royal order to form a society of intellectuals who can produce new, useful ideas, formally established the Spanish Royal Economic Society of Friends of the Country, after the model of the Royal Basque Society. Composed of leading men in local and foreign scholarships and training grants in agriculture and established an academy of design. It was also credited to the carabao ban of 1782, the formation of the silversmiths and gold beaters guild and the construction of the first paper mill in the Philippines in 1825. It was introduced in 1780, vanished temporarily in 1787–1819, 1820–1822 and 1875–1822, and ceased to exist in the middle of the 1890s.

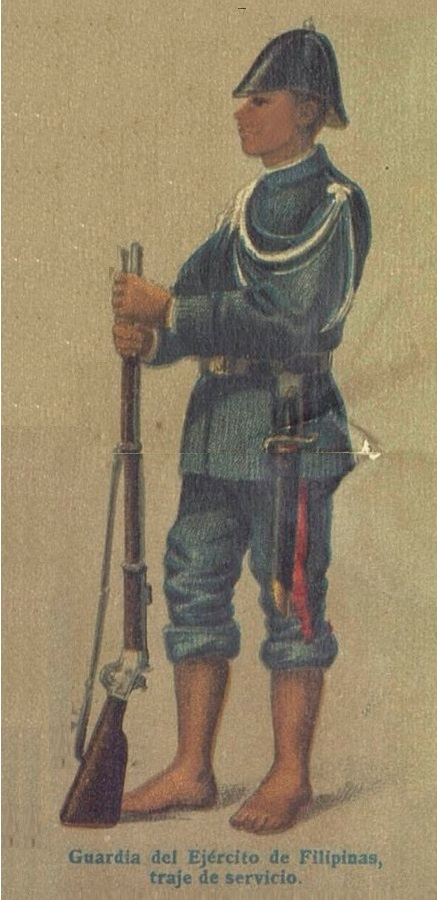
Civil Guard

=== Royal Company of the Philippines ===
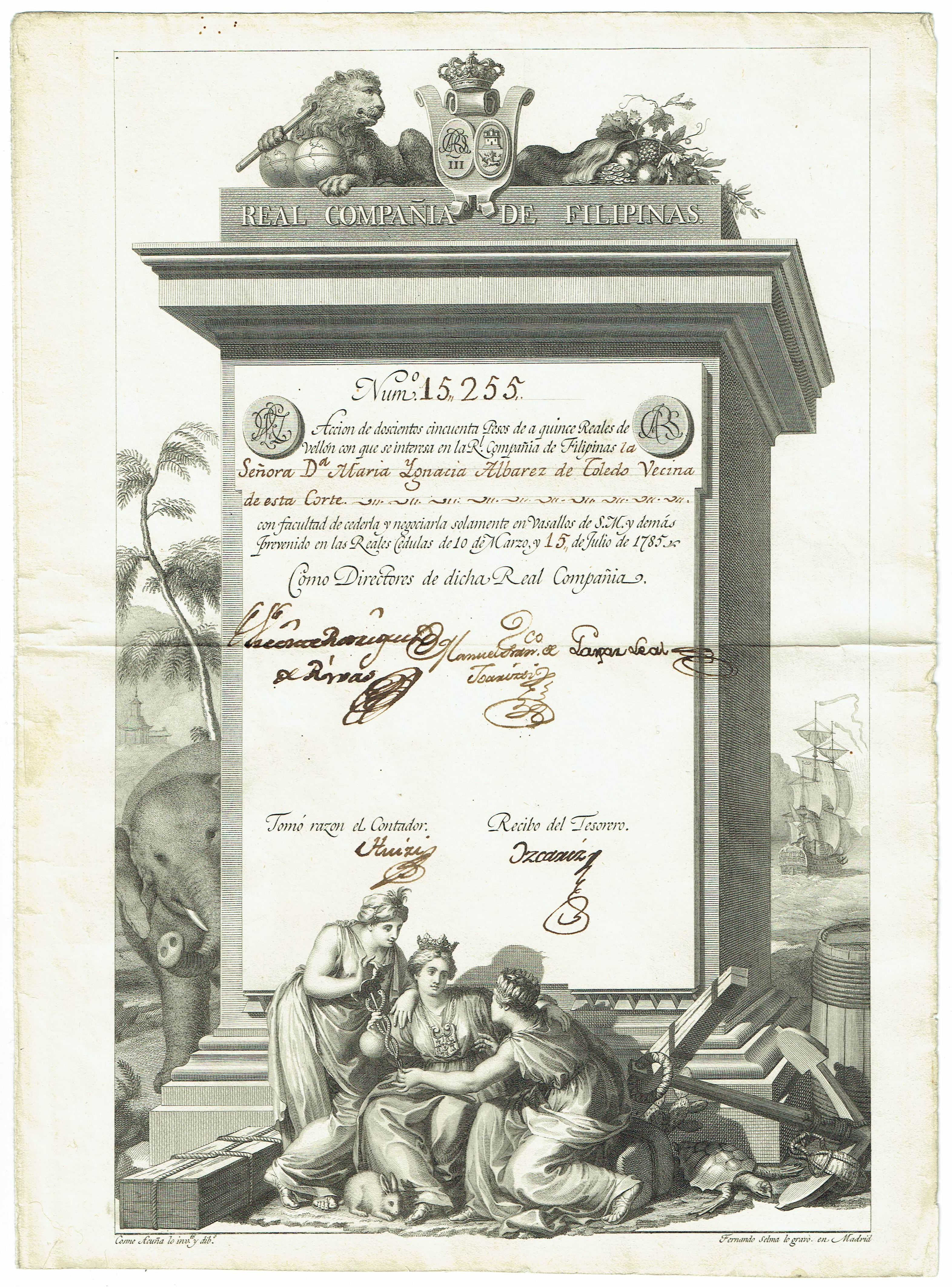
Real Compañia de Filipinas

On 10 March 1785, King Charles III of Spain confirmed the establishment of the Royal Philippine Company with a 25-year charter. After revoking the Royal Guipuzcoan Company of Caracas that had a monopoly on Venezuelan trade, the Basque-based company was granted a monopoly on the importation of Chinese and Indian goods into the Philippines, as well as the shipping of the goods directly to Spain via the Cape of Good Hope. The Dutch and British both bitterly opposed it because they saw the company as a direct attack on their trade in Asia. It also faced the hostility of the traders of the galleon trade who saw it as competition. This gradually resulted in the death of both institutions: the Royal Philippine Company in 1814 and the galleon trade in 1815.

The first vessel of the Royal Philippine Company to set sail was the "Nuestra Señora de los Placeres" commanded by the captain Juan Antonio Zabaleta.

=== Taxation ===
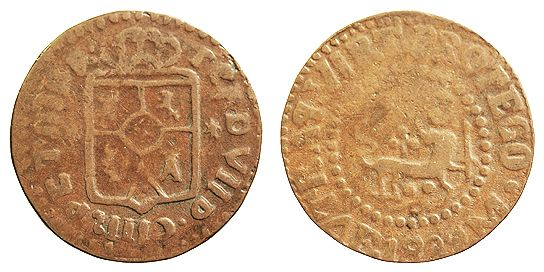
Spanish coin minted in Manila 1829, during the reign of Ferdinand VII of Spain

Also there was the bandalâ (from the Tagalog word mandalâ, a round stack of rice stalks to be threshed), an annual forced sale and requisitioning of goods such as rice. Custom duties and income tax were also collected. By 1884, the tribute was replaced by the cedula personal, wherein everyone over 18 were required to pay for personal identification. The local gobernadorcillos were responsible for collection of the tribute. Under the cedula system taxpayers were individually responsible to Spanish authorities for payment of the tax, and were subject to summary arrest for failure to show a cedula receipt.

Aside from paying a tribute, all male Filipinos as well as Chinese immigrants from 16 to 60 years old were obliged to render forced labor called "polo y servicio". This labor lasted for 40 days a year, later reduced to 15 days. It took various forms such as the building and repairing of roads and bridges, construction of public buildings and churches, cutting timber in the forest, working in shipyards, and serving as soldiers in military expeditions. People who rendered the forced labor was called "polistas". He could be exempted by paying the "falla" which is a sum of money. The polista were according to law, to be given a daily rice ration during their working days which they often did not receive.

== Resistance against Spanish rule ==
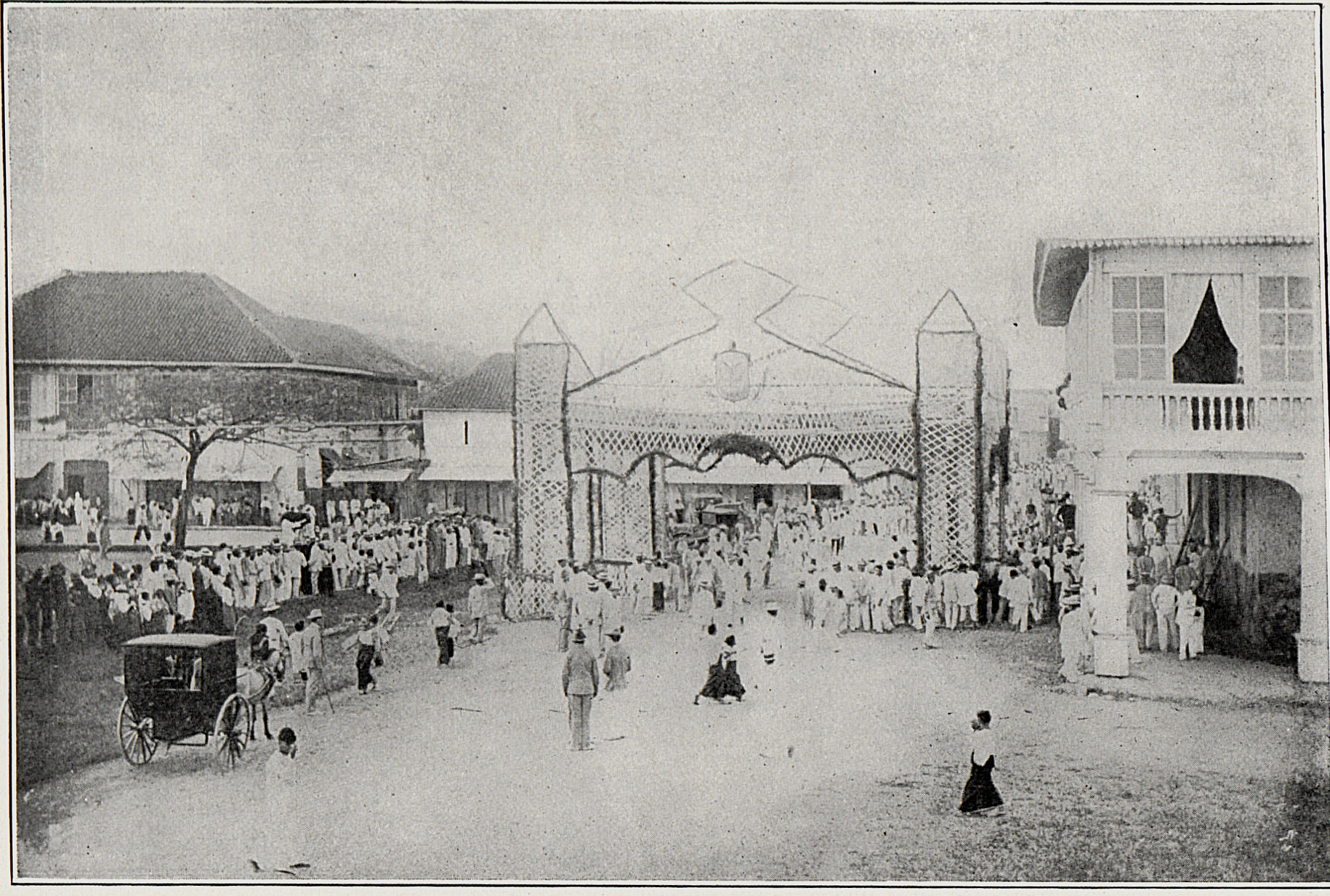
Town of Jaro, Iloilo, Philippines

Spanish rule of the Philippines was constantly threatened by indigenous rebellions and invasions from the Dutch, Chinese, Japanese, and British. The previously dominant groups resisted Spanish rule, refusing to pay Spanish taxes and rejecting Spanish excesses. All were defeated by the Spanish and their Filipino allies by 1597. In many areas, the Authorities left indigenous groups to administer their own affairs but under Spanish overlordship.

From its inception, the Captaincy General of the Philippines was governed from Mexico City as part of the Viceroyalty of New Spain. However, following Mexican independence in 1821, the Philippines and other Spanish Pacific islands were ruled directly from Madrid. The loss of supply routes and trading posts via Mexico presented logistical issues to the Spanish government in Madrid, isolating the Philippines and rendering them more difficult to govern efficiently.

=== Early resistance ===
The resistance against Spain did not immediately cease upon the conquest of the Austronesian cities. After Rajah Patis of Cebu, some indigenous Filipino nobles resisted Spanish rule. Throughout their rule, Madrid and the government in Manila had faced numerous revolts across the country, most of which they had successfully quelled while others were won through agreements with the leaders of the revolts themselves.

The Spanish–Moro conflict lasted for several hundred years. In the last quarter of the 19th century, Spain conquered portions of Mindanao and Jolo, and the Moro Muslims in the Sultanate of Sulu formally recognized Spanish sovereignty.

During the British occupation of Manila (1762–1764), Diego Silang was appointed by them as governor of Ilocos and after his assassination by fellow Filipinos, his wife Gabriela continued to lead the Ilocanos in the fight against Spanish rule. Resistance against Spanish rule was regional in character, based on ethnolinguistic groups.

Hispanization did not spread to the mountainous center of northern Luzon (Except in Some areas), nor to the inland communities of Mindanao.

=== Freemasonry ===
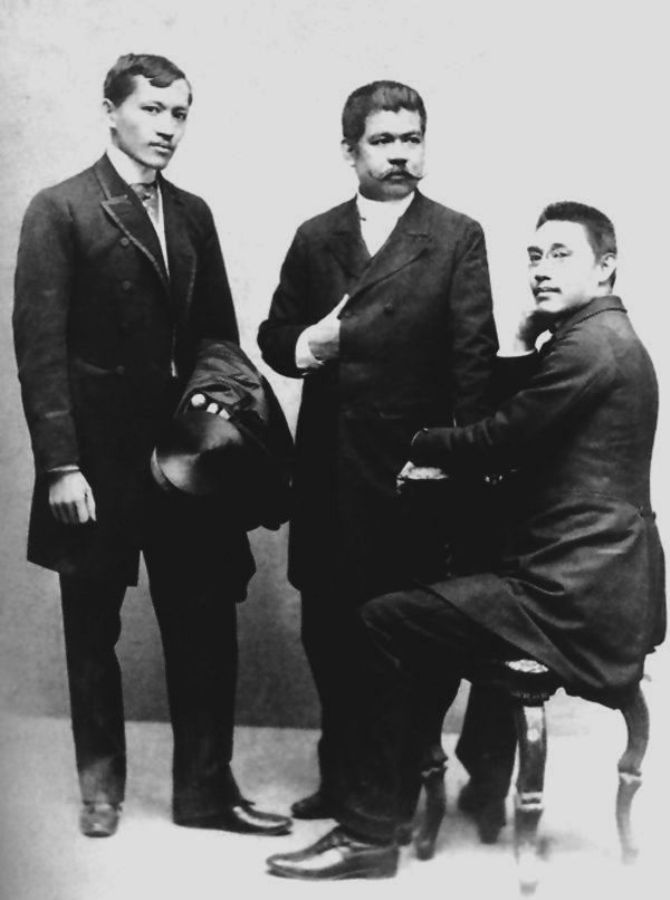
From left to right, José Rizal, Marcelo H. del Pilar, and Mariano Ponce

Freemasonry had gained a substantial following in Europe and the Americas during the 19th century and found its way to the Philippines. The Western World was quickly changing, and sought less political control from the Catholic Church.

The first Masonic lodge in the country was opened in 1856 in Manila, but not open to the native people. However, Filipinos studying in Spain learnt of Freemasonry and its ideals. The first Filipino Masonic lodge, Revolución, was established by Graciano López Jaena in Barcelona and was recognized in April 1889. It did not last long after he resigned from being its Worshipful Master on 29 November 1889.

In December 1889, Marcelo H. del Pilar established the Solidaridad in Madrid with the help of Julio Llorente, its first Worshipful Master. A short time later, the Solidaridad grew, and some of its members included José Rizal, Pedro Serrano Laktaw, Baldomero Roxas, and Galicano Apacible.

In 1891, Del Pilar sent Laktaw to the Philippines to establish a Masonic lodge. Laktaw established the Nilad on 6 January 1892, the first lodge in the islands. It is estimated that by 1893, there were 35 Masonic lodges in the Philippines, of which nine were in Manila. The first Filipina Freemason was Rosario Villaruel. Rizal's sisters Trinidad and Josefa, Marina Dizon, Romualda Lanuza, Purificación Leyva, and many other women join the Masonic movement.

Freemasonry was important during the Philippine Revolution, as it pushed the reform movement and carried out propaganda work. Many of those who supported outright revolution were Freemasons like Andrés Bonifacio. In fact, the organizational framework used by Bonifacio for the Katipunan was derived from Masonic structures. It may be said that joining Masonry was one activity that both reformists and the Katipuneros shared, despite their differing views.

== See also ==
- History of the Philippines (1565–1898)
- Domingo de Salazar
- Spanish East Indies
- Spanish Filipino
- New Spain
- Governor-General of the Philippines
- Royal Audience of Manila
- Spanish Empire
- Viceroyalty of New Spain
- History of the Philippines
- Civil Guard

== Sources ==
- Don Peterson (2007-2nd Qtr), 1898: Five Philippine Governors-General Serve Rapid Fire Terms, Philippine Philatelic Journal.
- Abinales, P. N.; Amoroso, Donna J. (2005), State and Society in the Philippines, Rowman & Littlefield, ISBN 978-0-7425-1024-1
- Agoncillo, Teodoro A. (1990), History of the Filipino People (Eighth ed.), University of the Philippines, ISBN 971-8711-06-6
- Blair, Emma Helen & Robertson, James Alexander, eds. (1911). The Philippine Islands, 1493–1803: Explorations by early navigators, descriptions of the islands and their peoples, their history and records of the catholic missions, as related in contemporaneous books and manuscripts, showing the political, economic, commercial and religious conditions of those islands from their earliest relations with European nations to the beginning of the nineteenth century. Volume 03 of 55 (1493–1803). Historical introduction and additional notes by Edward Gaylord Bourne. Cleveland, Ohio: Arthur H. Clark Company. ISBN 978-0554259598. OCLC 769945704.
- De Borja, Marciano R.; Douglass, William A. (2005), Basques in the Philippines, University of Nevada Press, ISBN 978-0-87417-590-5
- McCoy, Alfred W.; de Jesus, Ed. C. (2001), Philippine social history: global trade and local transformations, Ateneo de Manila University Press, ISBN 978-971-550-279-5
- Sagmit, Rosario S.; Sagmit-Mendoza, Ma. Lourdes (2007), The Filipino Moving Onward 5', Rex Bookstore, Inc., ISBN 978-971-23-4154-0
