= List of Phi Kappa Phi members =

Phi Kappa Phi is an international collegiate honor society. Following is a list of some notable members of Phi Kappa Phi.

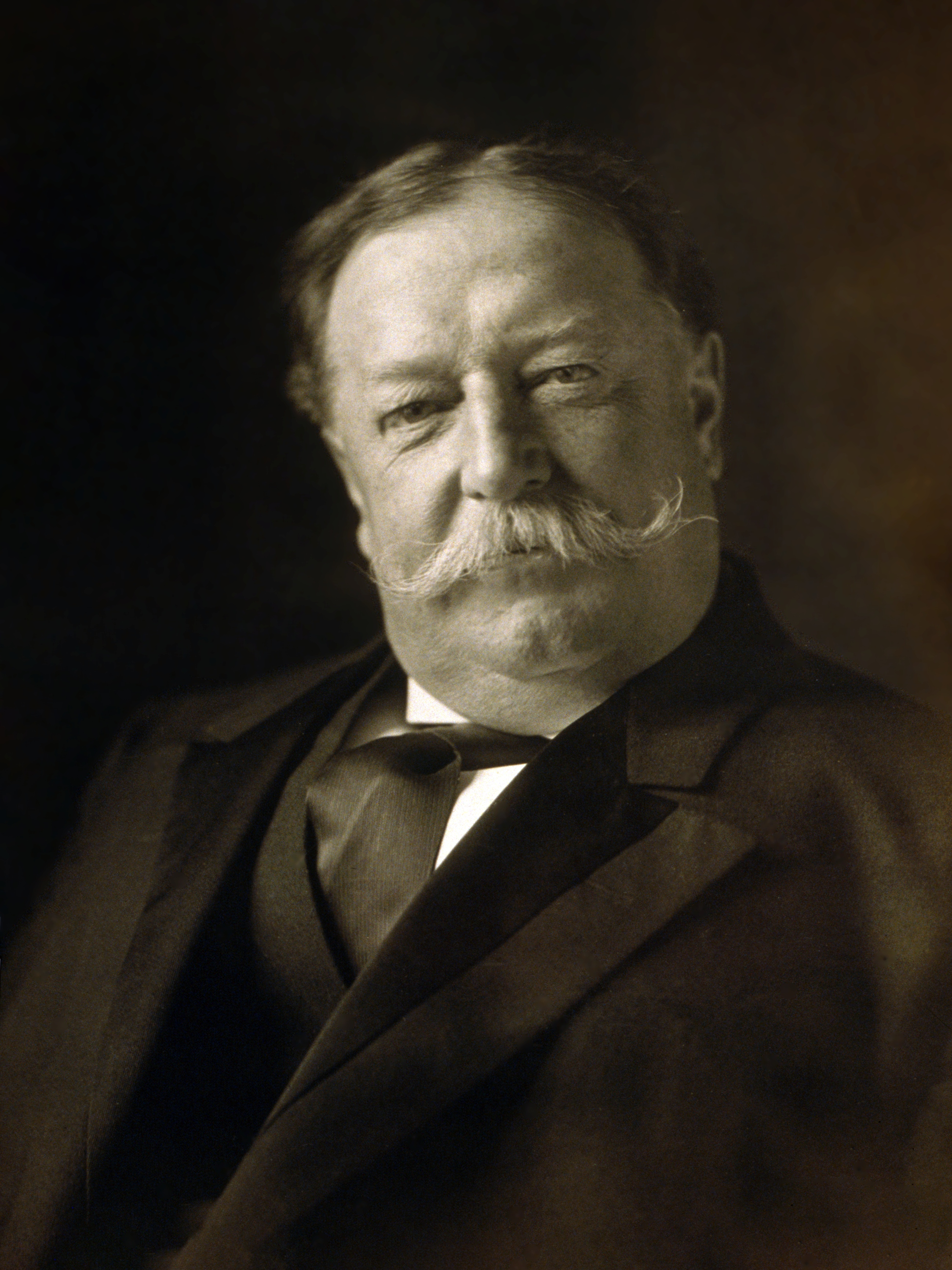
William Howard Taft, 27th president of the United States and 10th chief justice of the Supreme Court of the United States

== Academia ==
=== Presidents ===
- Joseph E. Aoun, 7th president of Northeastern University
- Amine Bensaid, president of Al Akhawayn University
- John R. Brazil, president of Trinity University
- Vernon D. Crawford, dean and interim president of the Georgia Institute of Technology
- James Creese, president of the Drexel Institute of Technology
- Peter M. Donohue, president of Villanova University
- Milton Stover Eisenhower, president of three major American universities
- Marye Anne Fox, chancellor of the University of California, San Diego
- Abram W. Harris, president of Northwestern University and University of Maine, a founder of Phi Kappa Phi and Alpha Delta Tau
- Matina Horner, sixth president of Radcliffe College
- Freeman A. Hrabowski III, president of University of Maryland, Baltimore County
- Leon H. Johnson, president of Montana State University
- Robert Khayat, chancellor of the University of Mississippi
- Tedd L. Mitchell, fifth chancellor of the Texas Tech University System
- Lou Anna Simon, 20th president of Michigan State University
- James Monroe Smith, president of Louisiana State University
- Teresa A. Sullivan, 8th president of the University of Virginia
- Richard F. Wilson, 18th president of Illinois Wesleyan University

=== Faculty ===
- Doris Twitchell Allen, psychologist and professor
- Stephen Ambrose, historian and professor
- Kwame Anthony Appiah, philosopher, professor, and awardee of the National Humanities Medal
- George C. Baldwin, theoretical and experimental physicist and professor
- David Herbert Donald, historian and professor
- Michael P. Doyle, regents professor of food microbiology at the University of Georgia
- Harry Morton Fitzpatrick, professor of mycology at Cornell University
- Roswell Clifton Gibbs, chairman of the Department of Physics at Cornell University
- Barry Glassner, professor of sociology
- John Graham, financial economist and professor at the Duke University Fuqua School of Business
- Laurin L. Henry, professor and researcher in presidential transitions
- Douglas W. Jones, computer scientist at the University of Iowa
- Edward L. Kaplan, mathematician and professor at Oregon State University
- Mark L. Knapp, distinguished teaching professor emeritus at the University of Texas at Austin
- John Knox, meteorologist and professor at the University of Georgia
- Riki Kobayashi, professor of chemical engineering at Rice University
- Kyle D. Logue, professor of law at the University of Michigan Law School
- Shlomo Sawilowsky, professor of educational statistics at Wayne State University
- Bernadotte Everly Schmitt, Pulitzer Prize–winning historian and professor of modern European history at the University of Chicago
- W. Harry Vaughan, professor of ceramic engineering at the Georgia School of Technology
- Blaž Zupan, computer scientist and university professor

== Art and architecture ==
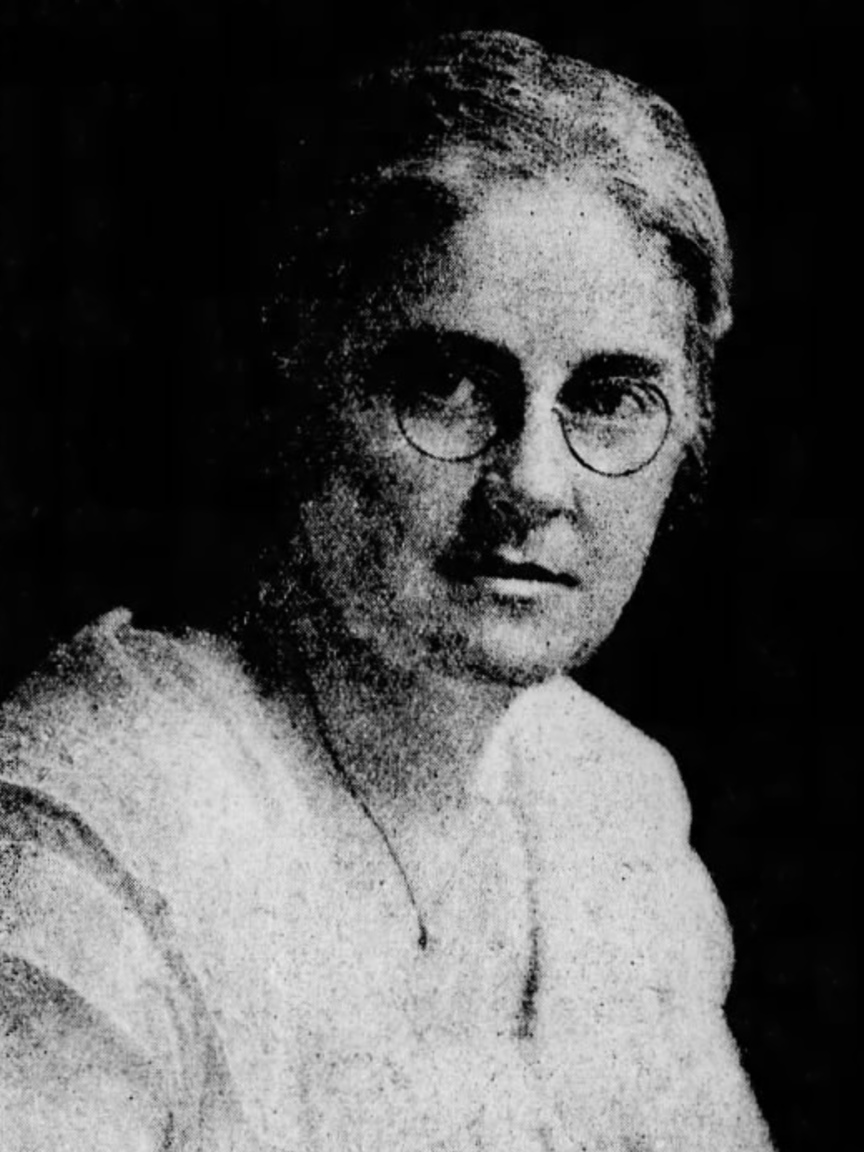
Agnes Ballard, architect and educator

- Agnes Ballard, architect
- Leslie Erganian, artist who works in photography, collage, assemblage, and animation
- Glenna Goodacre, sculptor, designer of the Vietnam Women's Memorial
- Joe Lewis, artist
- Harold Lohner, printmaker and designer of freeware and shareware fonts
- Richard Mawdsley, artist
- William Rupp, modernist architect considered part the Sarasota School of Architecture
- Frank Albert Waugh, pioneer of landscape architecture

== Business ==
- James Barksdale, president and CEO of Netscape Communications Corporation
- Felipe Gozon, chairman of GMA Network
- Chad Hurley, co-founder of YouTube
- Ray O. Johnson, CEO of Technology Innovation Institute and former Lockheed Martin chief technology officer
- Alice Marriott, entrepreneur and philanthropist
- Robert A. McDonald, chairman, president, and CEO of Procter & Gamble
- Donald Weder, inventor
- John Zeglis, president of AT&T; chairman and chief executive officer (CEO) of AT&T Wireless

== Entertainment ==
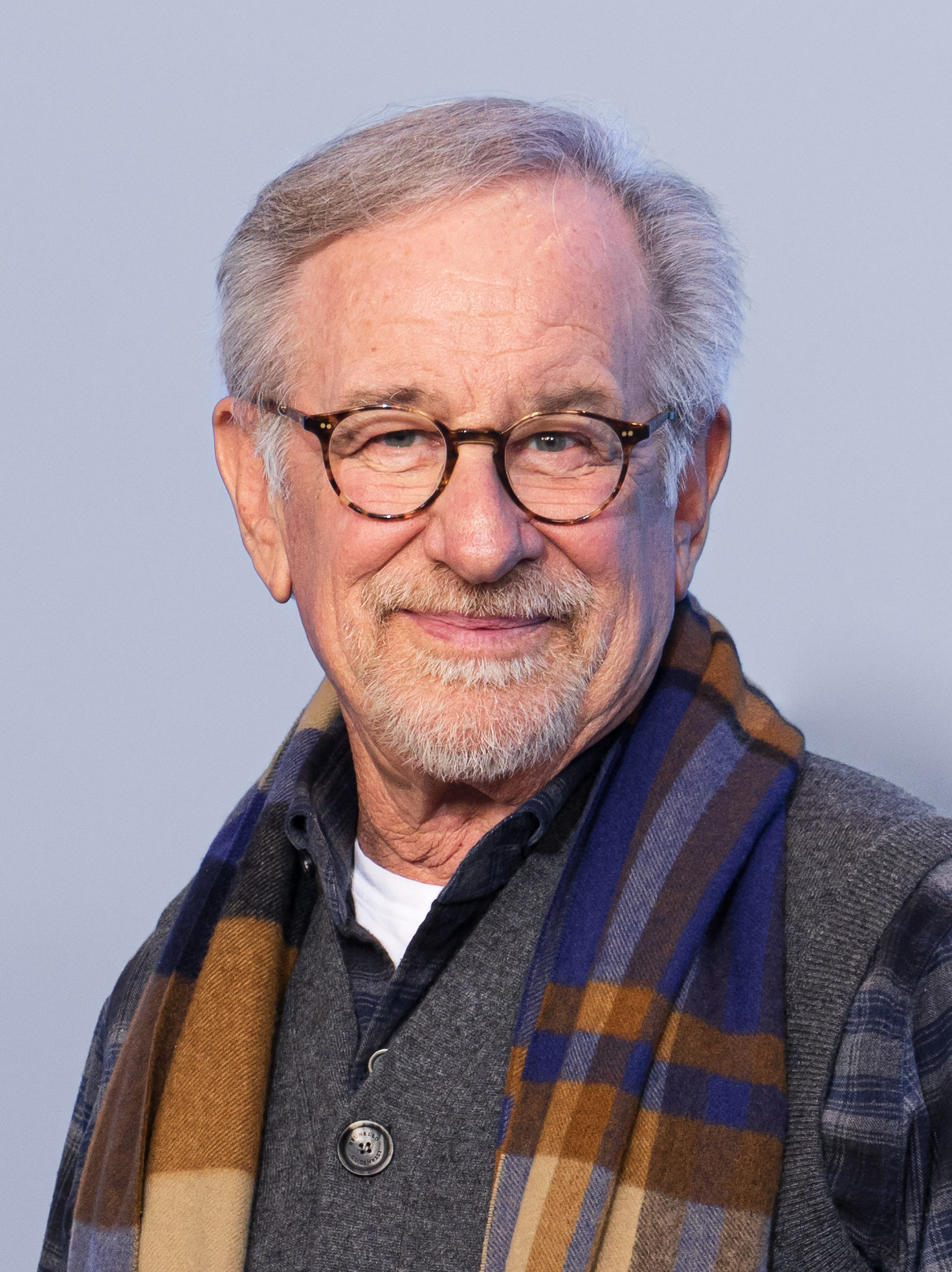
Steven Spielberg, filmmaker

- Nilo Alcala, composer
- Ernie Anastos, Emmy Award-winning television news anchor and talk show host
- William Bolcom, composer and pianist, recipient of the Pulitzer Prize, the National Medal of Arts, and a Grammy Award
- David Brubeck, jazz musician
- Paul Comi, actor
- Gaby Concepcion, television host and actress
- Karl Engemann, record industry executive, producer, and entertainment industry personal manager
- Renee Fleming, opera singer and Grammy Award winner
- Arlie Honeycutt, Miss North Carolina 2012
- Steve Inskeep, host of Morning Edition and Up First on National Public Radio
- Sharon Jordan, actress
- Ellis Marsalis, jazz musician
- Resh Marhatta, actor and filmmaker
- Gulimina Mahamuti, pianist
- Deborah Norville, television anchor for Inside Edition and member of the board of directors at Viacom Corporation
- Timothy Rhea, director of bands and music activities at Texas A&M University
- Christopher Rouse, Pulitzer Prize-winning composer
- George Shannon, actor
- Steven Spielberg, filmmaker
- Regina Hansen Willman, composer

== Law ==
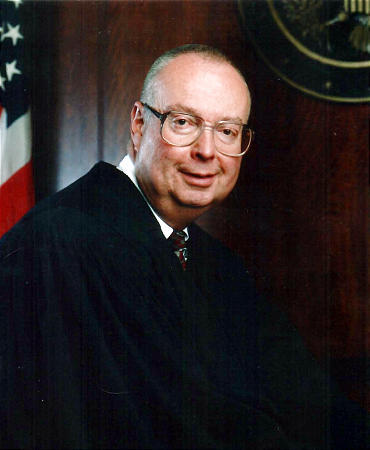
Dale A. Kimball, senior United States district judge of the United States District Court for the District of Utah

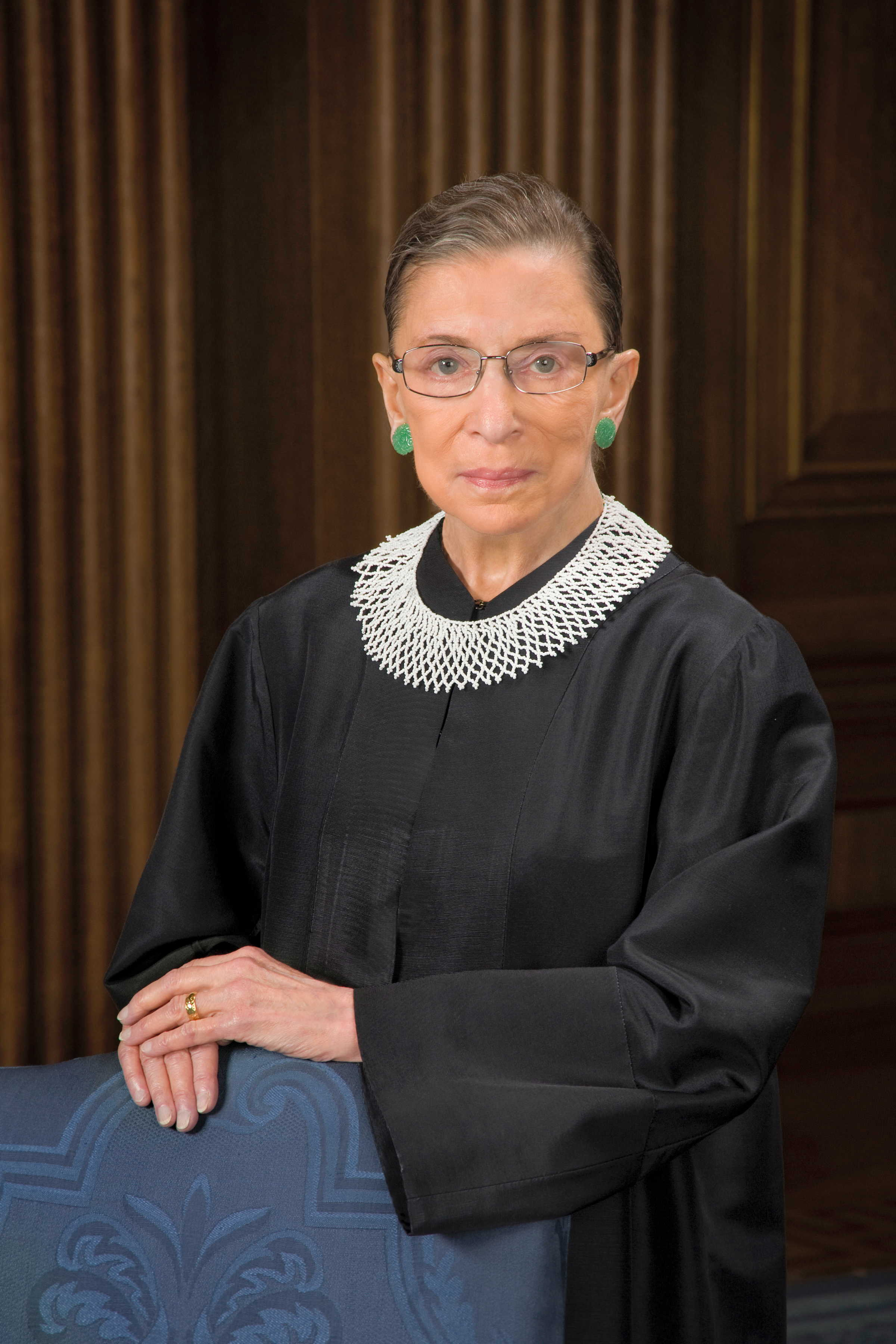
Ruth Bader Ginsberg, associate justice of the Supreme Court of the United States

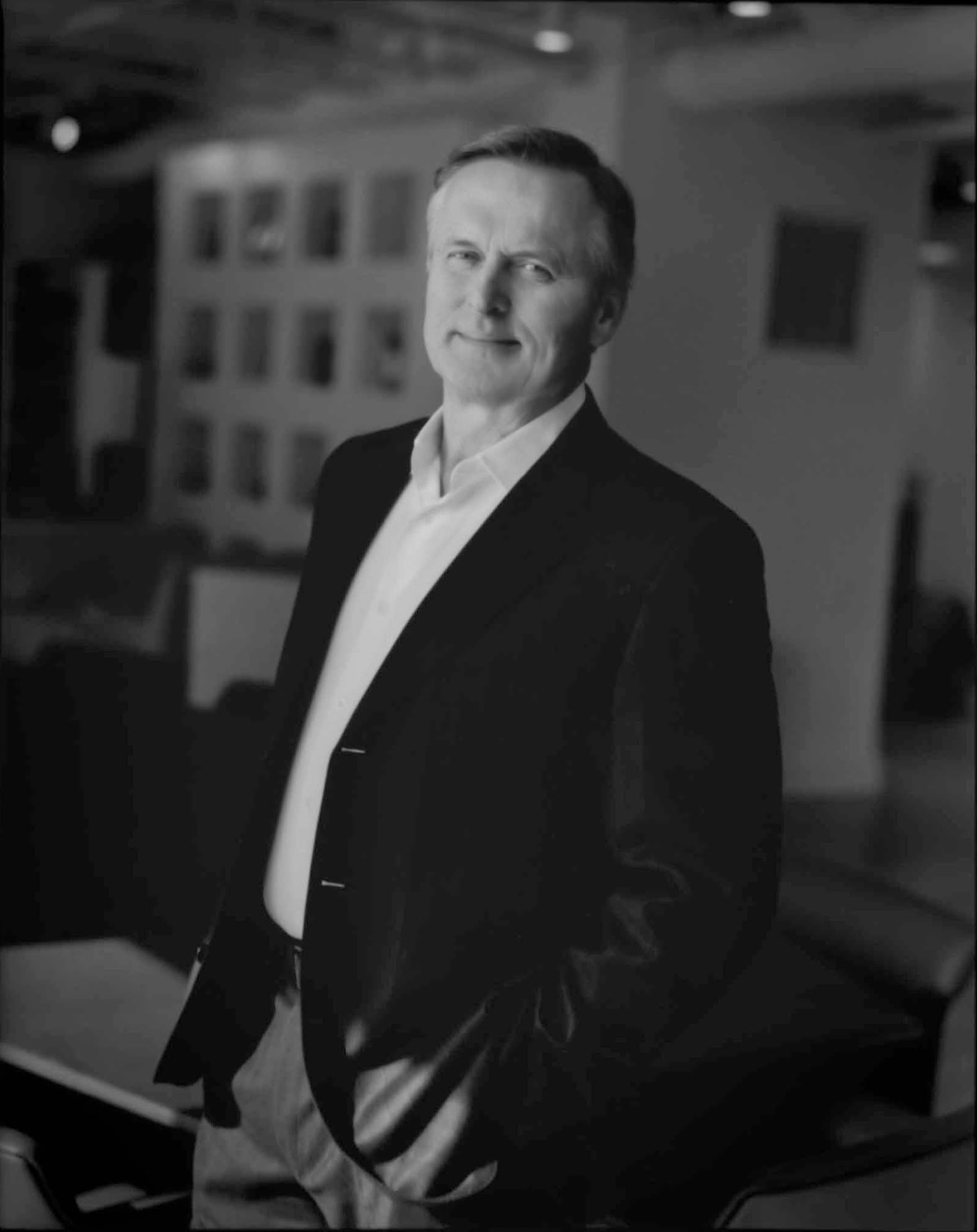
John Grisham, novelist, lawyer, and former member of the Mississippi House of Representatives

- Charles Bayley Adams, president of the Vermont State Senate, justice of the Vermont Supreme Court
- Stephen H. Anderson, senior United States circuit judge of the United States Court of Appeals for the Tenth Circuit
- Margaret Currin, United States attorney for the Eastern District of North Carolina
- Fernande R. V. Duffly, associate justice of the Massachusetts Supreme Judicial Court
- Ruth Bader Ginsburg, associate justice of the Supreme Court of the United States
- Shiro Kashiwa, attorney general of Hawaii, United States circuit judge of the United States Court of Appeals for the Federal Circuit
- Dale A. Kimball, senior United States district judge of the United States District Court for the District of Utah
- Jose P. Perez, associate justice of the Supreme Court of the Philippines
- Vincent Ragosta, Rhode Island Superior Court justice
- Jane A. Restani, senior United States judge of the United States Court of International Trade
- Edward Terry Sanford, associate justice of the Supreme Court of the United States
- Chesterfield Smith, president of the American Bar Association

== Literature and journalism ==
- John Balaban, poet
- David Baldacci, novelist
- Brené Brown, author
- Gaétan Brulotte, writer
- Lela E. Buis, speculative fiction writer, playwright, poet and artist
- Julie Cantrell, editor and best-selling author
- Turner Catledge, senior executive of The New York Times
- Rita Dove, Pulitzer Prize–winning poet
- Robert B. Downs, author and librarian
- Ernest J Gaines, author, MacArthur Foundation fellow, and awardee of the National Humanities Medal
- Alex Grant, poet
- John Grisham, author
- R. S. Gwynn, poet
- Charles W. Henderson, author who writes about military history
- Harold Kaese, sports writer, best known for covering Major League Baseball
- W. Patrick Lang, author, commentator on the Middle East, special forces officer, and intelligence executive
- Lucky Meisenheimer, author
- Kathleen Parker, nationally syndicated columnist for The Washington Post
- Stephanie Saul, Pulitzer Prize-winning journalist known for her work at Newsday and The New York Times
- George Edward Stanley, author of books for children
- Matthew VanDyke, freedom fighter and prisoner of war in the 2011 Libyan Civil War
- Harvey Wasserman, investigative reporter and senior editor of The Columbus Free Press
- John Noble Wilford, Pulitzer Prize–winning journalist

== Military ==
- Jody A. Breckenridge, United States Coast Guard admiral
- William Allen Knowlton, superintendent of the United States Military Academy
- Ray Mabus, 75th United States secretary of the Navy
- Walter Wojdakowski, retired United States Army major general

== Politics ==
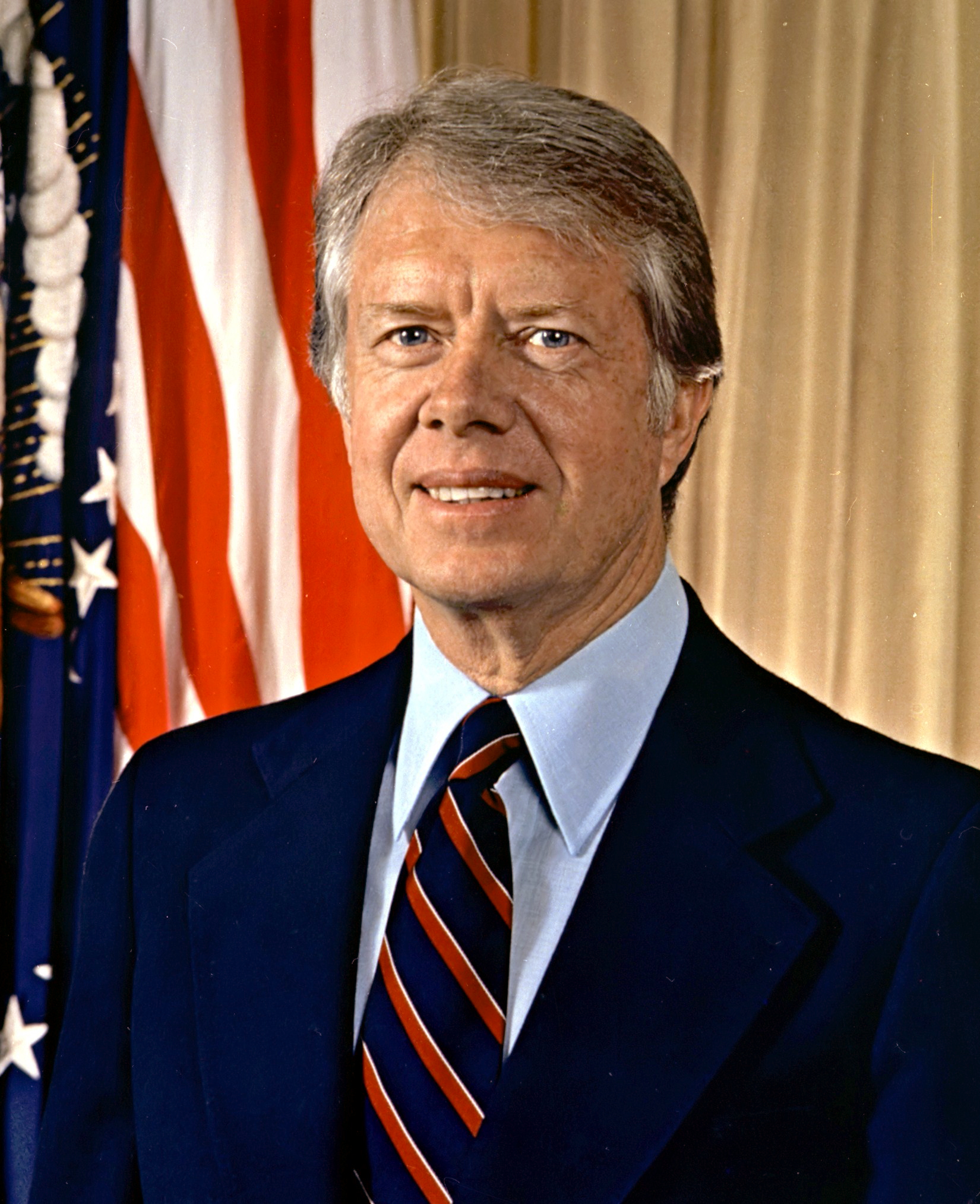
Jimmy Carter, 39th president of the United States

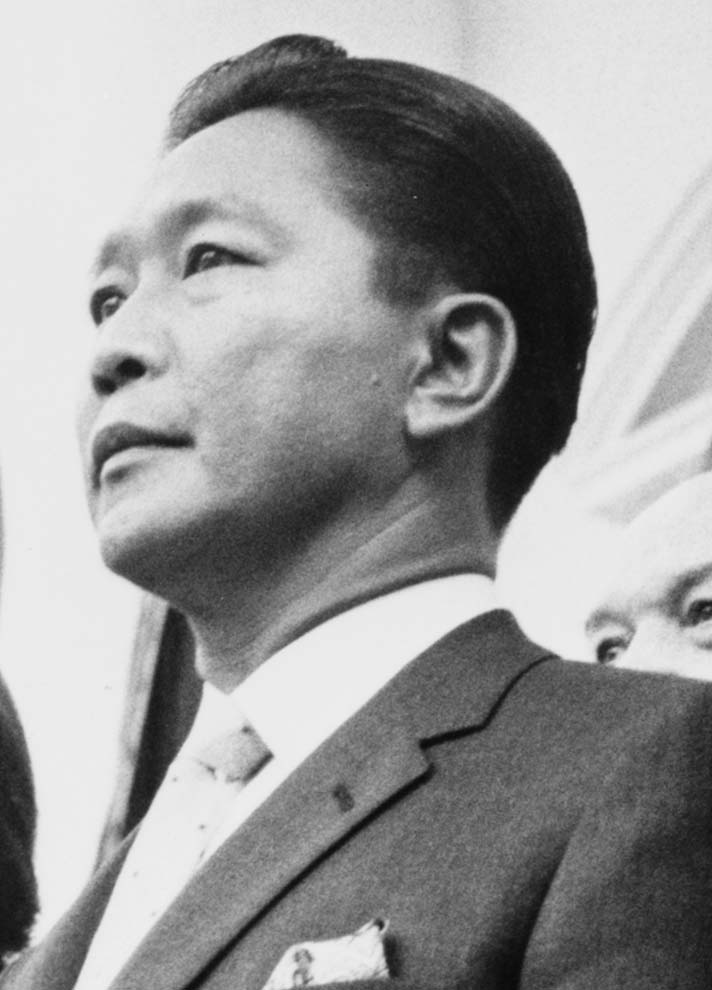
Ferdinand Marcos, 10th president of the Philippines

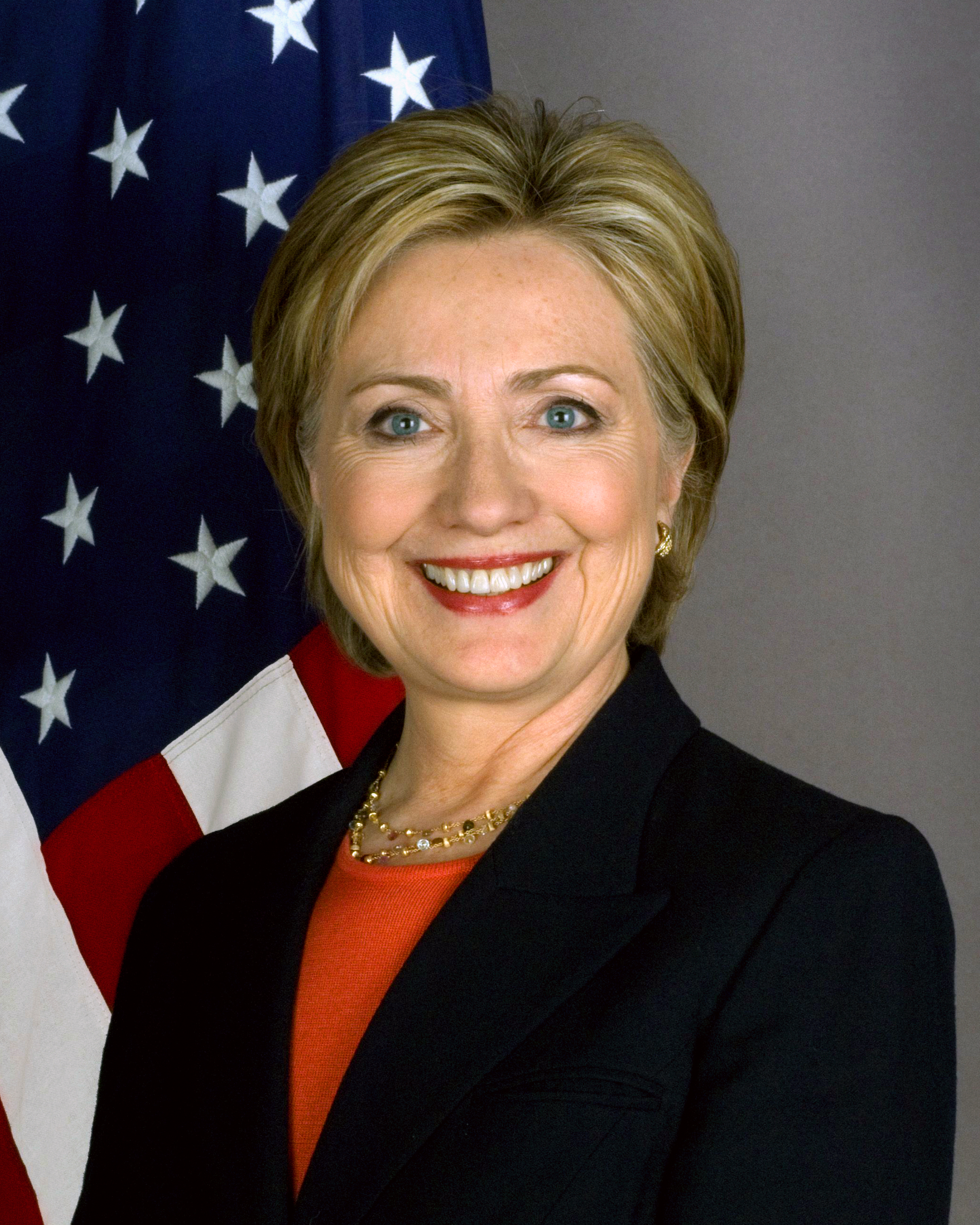
Hillary Clinton, 67th United States Secretary of State

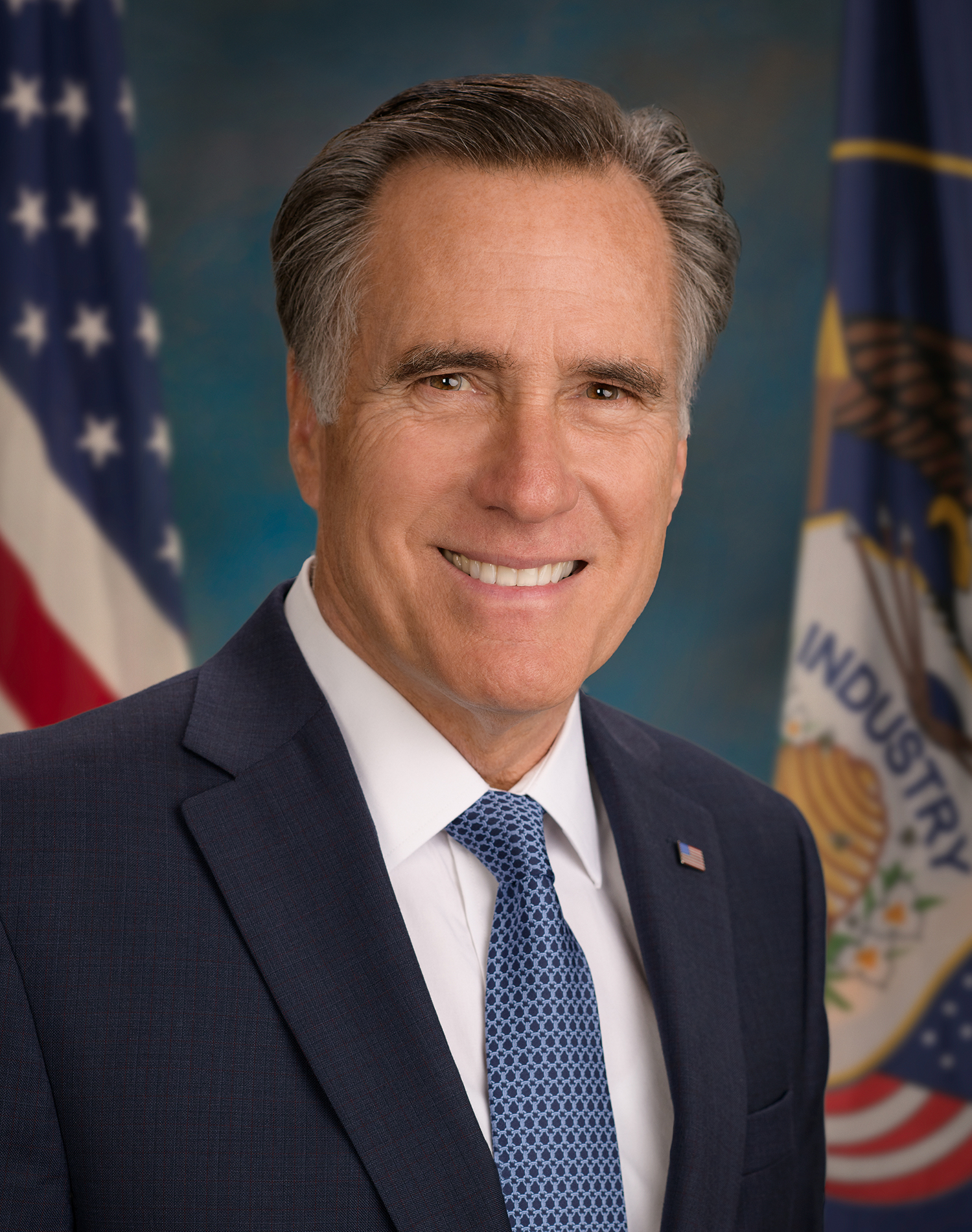
Mitt Romney, 70th governor of Massachusetts

- H. Gardner Ackley, economist and former United States ambassador to Italy
- Ellis Arnall, 69th governor of Georgia
- Kathleen Blanco, 54th governor of Louisiana
- Walt Brown, politician and former presidential candidate of the Socialist Party USA
- Jimmy Carter, 39th president of the United States
- Eric Chua, Singapore member of Parliament
- Hillary Clinton, 67th United States secretary of state
- Thad Cochran, United States senator
- Luis Ernesto Derbez, Mexico's secretary of economy and secretary of foreign affairs
- Michael Dukakis, 65th and 67th governor of Massachusetts
- Henry H. Fowler, 58th United States secretary of the treasury
- Robert Gates, 22nd United States secretary of defense
- Al Gore, 45th vice president of the United States
- Nathaniel Edwin Harris, 61st governor of Georgia
- Samuel Ichiye Hayakawa, United States senator
- Marjorie Holt, United States congresswoman
- William Marion Jardine, United States secretary of agriculture and ambassador
- Alf Landon, 26th governor of Kansas and United States presidential nominee
- Jose P. Laurel, 3rd president of the Philippines
- Ferdinand Marcos, 10th president of the Philippines
- Edward Perkins, former United States ambassador and director of the United States Diplomatic Corps
- Russell Peterson, 66th governor of Delaware
- Fidel V. Ramos, 12th president of the Philippines
- Harry Reid, United States Senate majority leader
- Mitt Romney, 70th governor of Massachusetts
- Carlos P. Romulo, president of the Fourth Session of United Nations General Assembly
- Robert Walter Scott, 67th governor of North Carolina
- James Graves Scrugham, 14th governor of Nevada
- Robert L. F. Sikes, United States congressman
- William Howard Taft, 27th president of the United States and 10th chief justice of the United States
- Morris Udall, U.S. representative
- Elizabeth Warren, United States senator

== Science and technology ==
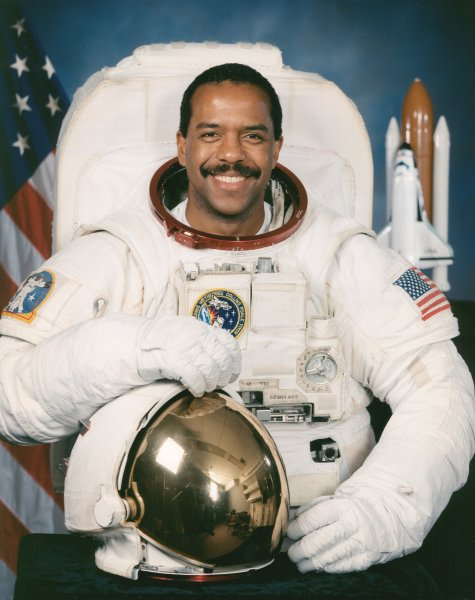
Bernard A. Harris Jr., first African American to spacewalk

- James P. Bagian, physician, engineer, and former NASA astronaut
- Stephen Bowen, NASA astronaut
- Samuel T. Durrance, scientist who flew aboard two NASA Space Shuttle missions as a payload specialist
- Douglas Engelbart, inventor and internet pioneer
- Maria Elizabeth Fernald, entomologist
- Bernard A. Harris, Jr., first African American to spacewalk
- Ora Willis Knight, naturalist and the state mineralogist for Maine
- Christina Koch, NASA astronaut
- Tim Kopra, NASA astronaut and former commander of the International Space Station
- Craig D. Idso, founder, president, and chairman of the board of the Center for the Study of Carbon Dioxide and Global Change
- Wendy Lawrence, NASA astronaut
- Jerry M. Linenger, NASA astronaut who flew on the Space Shuttle and Space Station Mir
- Franklin Matthias, civil engineer who directed the construction of the Hanford nuclear site
- James A. McDivitt, commander of Gemini 4 and Apollo 9
- George Andrew Olah, Nobel Prize–winning chemist
- Rahul Pandit, condensed matter physicist, Shanti Swarup Bhatnagar laureate
- Ronald Parise, scientist who flew aboard two NASA Space Shuttle missions as a payload specialist
- Linus Pauling, Nobel Peace Prize and Nobel Prize in chemistry
- Ida Rhodes, mathematician who was influential in early computer development
- Yvette Richardson, meteorologist
- Claude Shannon, "father of information theory"
- Norman Thagard, NASA astronaut
- Kathryn C. Thornton, scientist, former NASA astronaut

== Sports ==
Robelyn Garcia, professional basketball player

- Robelyn Garcia, professional basketball player
- Bob DuPuy, former president and chief operating officer of Major League Baseball
- Melvin Ejim, professional basketball player
- Ted Howard, soccer executive
- Rosalie Passovoy, tennis player
- Jim Tressel, former head football coach at Ohio State University
- Marshall Tyler, head coach of the Rhode Island Rams football
- Dallas Ward, head football coach at the University of Colorado in Boulder
