= Centro Escolar University Makati =

Private university satellite campus in Makati, Philippines

- Pamantasang Centro Escolar sa Makati (Filipino)
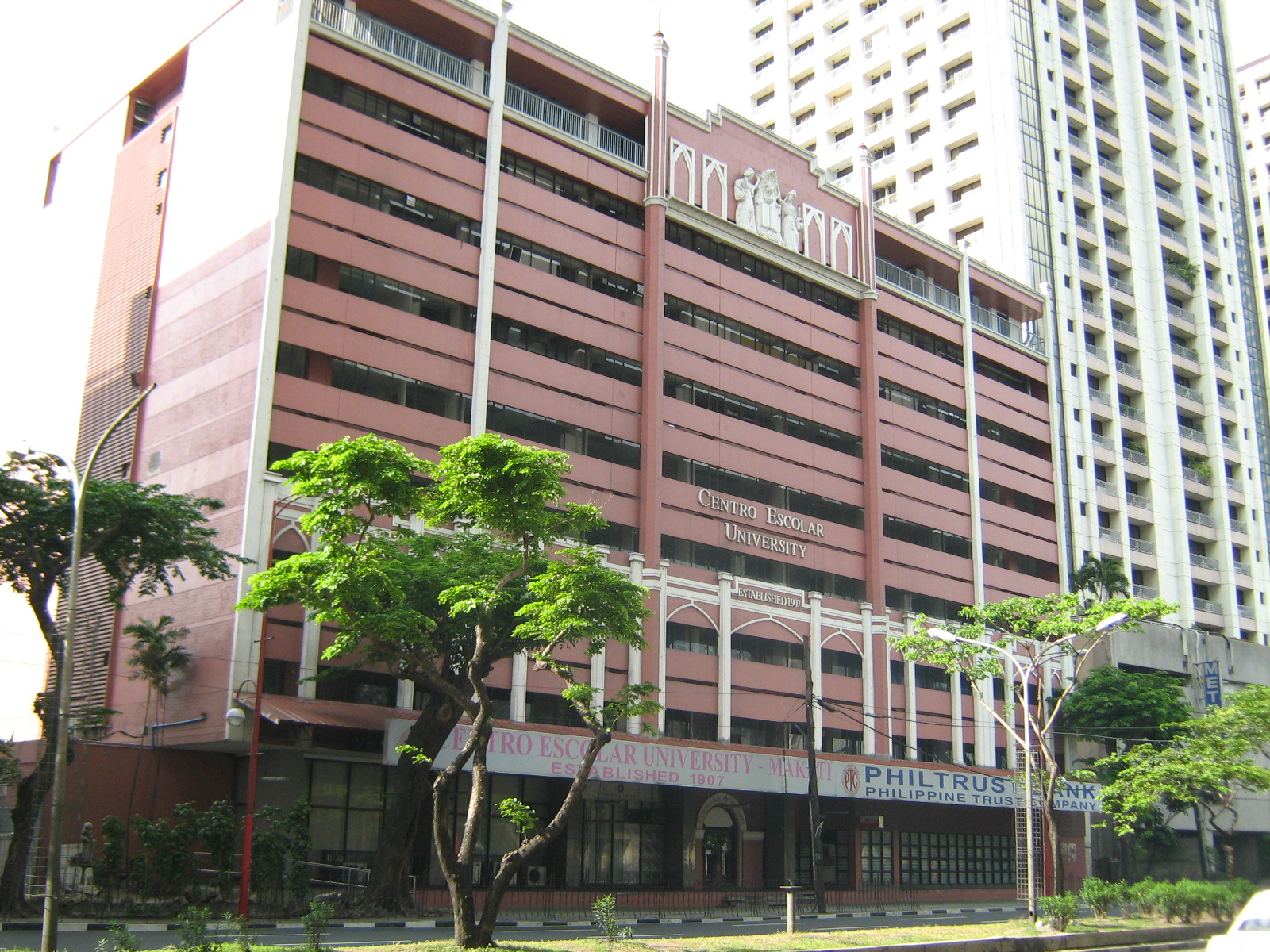
- Motto: Ciencia Y Virtud (Spanish)
- Motto in English: Science and Virtue
- Type: Private, non-sectarian higher education institution
- Established: 2005 (Gil Puyat Unit); 2007 (Legaspi Village Unit)
- Academic affiliations: IAU, ASAIHL
- President: Ma. Cristina D. Padolina, Ph. D.
- Location: Makati, Metro Manila, Philippines; 14°33′39″N 121°00′46″E
- Campus: Urban
- Hymn: Imno ng Pamantasang Centro Escolar (Centro Escolar University Hymn) by Alfredo S. Buenaventura
- Colors: Pink and Grey
- Mascot: CEU Scorpions
- Website: www.ceu.edu.ph

- Location in Metro Manila Location in Luzon Location in the Philippines

Centro Escolar University Makati is a satellite campus of the Centro Escolar University in Manila. Its campus is in Makati.

CEU Makati is the home to the CEU School of Law and Jurisprudence.

== The Campus ==
=== Gil Puyat Unit ===
Located in the Makati Central Business District, CEU's first Makati campus building is housed in the Philtrust Bank Building along Sen. Gil Puyat Sr. Avenue. The science course is taken here. The campus consists of air-conditioned classrooms, laboratories, a library and lecture halls equipped with audio-visual facilities, and a car park. It also houses the CEU School of Law and Jurisprudence which was established last 2009.

=== Legaspi Village Unit ===
The Centro Escolar University Makati Legaspi Village Unit is located at Legaspi Village along Esteban-Bolaños Streets as the extension to the Gil Puyat Unit. The non-science and the Doctor of Dental Medicine courses are located here. This building consists of air-conditioned classrooms, computer laboratories, and a library with audio-visual facilities. The new addition is the dental facility inside the building.

== School of Law and Jurisprudence ==
The Juris Doctor Program is offered by the Centro Escolar University at its Sen. Gil Puyat campus at the heart of Makati.

== Student involvement ==
University Student Council Makati

The USC is the highest-governing body in the university. It represents the students' rights and interests. It trains students in leadership, fosters appreciation for self-government, encourages initiative and participation in the activities of the university, and promotes wholesome companionship.

CEU Singers Makati

The Centro Escolar University Singers Makati is the official resident choral group of the campus. It is part of the Centro Escolar University Singers, which also includes CEU Singers Manila and CEU Singers Malolos.

CEU Makati Peer Facilitators Group

The Peer Facilitators Group is a group of students that serves as a strong bridge between the student population and the Guidance and Counseling Section.

CEU Makati Varsity Team

The Makati Varsity Team is composed of students from different programs of the campus. The team showcases sports and athletic ability. They compete every year in the CEU Sportsfest.

== Notable Makati Escolarians ==
- Roxanne Corluy, BS Medical Technology - Top 10, Mutya ng Pilipinas 2011; runner-up, Miss Philippines Earth 2012
- Yuki Sakamoto, BS HRM - recording artist and main vocalist, 1:43
