= Centro Escolar University =

Private university in Manila, Philippines

- Pamantasang Centro Escolar (Filipino) Universidad Centro Escolar (Spanish)
- Former name: Centro Escolar de Señoritas (1907–1933)
- Motto: Spanish: Ciencia y Virtud; English: Science and Virtue
- Type: Private nonsectarian coeducational university
- Established: June 3, 1907; 119 years ago
- Founders: Librada Avelino; Carmen de Luna
- Academic affiliations: IAU PAASCU AUN UMAP PACUCOA ASAIHL
- President: Danilo Concepcion (2025–present)
- Students: 20,000+
- Location: 9 Mendiola Street; San Miguel, Manila, Philippines; 14°35′57″N 120°59′31″E
- Alma Mater song: Himno ng Pamantasang Centro Escolar (Centro Escolar University Hymn)
- Colors: Pink and Grey
- Sporting affiliations: UCAL, MNCAA, WNCAA
- Mascot: Scorpions
- Website: www.ceu.edu.ph
- Location in Manila Location in Metro Manila Location in Luzon Location in the Philippines

Centro Escolar University (Filipino: Pamantasang Centro Escolar; Spanish: Universidad Centro Escolar), commonly referred to as CEU, is a private, non-sectarian, coeducational institution of higher education located in Manila, Philippines. Founded in 1907 by Librada Avelino and Carmen de Luna, CEU is recognized as one of the oldest modern universities in the Philippines. It operates six campuses, including its main campus in San Miguel, Manila, with additional campuses in Malolos, Las Piñas, Cebu City, and two in Makati (Gil Puyat and Legaspi). CEU offers more than fifty academic programs and is actively involved in research across a range of disciplines.

CEU is accredited by the Federation of Accrediting Agencies of the Philippines and the Philippine Association of Colleges and Universities' Commission on Accreditation (Level IV, the highest level), and has full autonomous status from the Commission on Higher Education (CHED). It is certified by the Institute of Corporate Directors, the Department of Trade and Industry, SGS S.A., Arthram International Organization for Standardization, and the ASEAN University Network. In 2006, CEU won the Papal Award Pro Ecclesia et Pontifice. In 2022, CEU was awarded with the Safety Seal from the Department of the Interior and Local Government.

== History ==
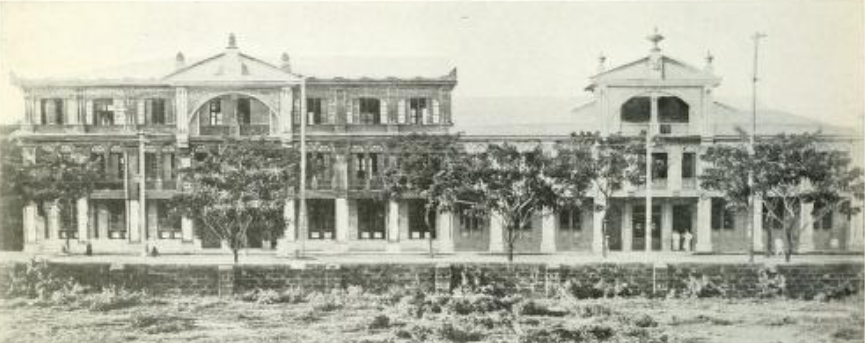
Centro Escolar de Señoritas

CEU was established in 1907 by pedagogists Librada Avelino and Carmen de Luna as the Centro Escolar de Señoritas, based in Parañaque. Its main purpose was to teach "ideal womanhood, intelligent citizenry, and democratic leadership that would instill in the tenets of science and virtue." At the time of its establishment, it was the first non-sectarian women's educational institution in the Philippines (now a coeducational educational institution). It founded the College of Pharmacy in 1921, pioneering medical education in the Philippines. Subsequently, the Colleges of Liberal Arts, Education, Business, Dentistry, and Optometry were also established one after another. It began operating as a university in 1930 and in 1932 was converted into a corporation for financial reasons. Its name was then changed to Centro Escolar University, which still holds today. In 2009, the School of Law and Jurisprudence was established.

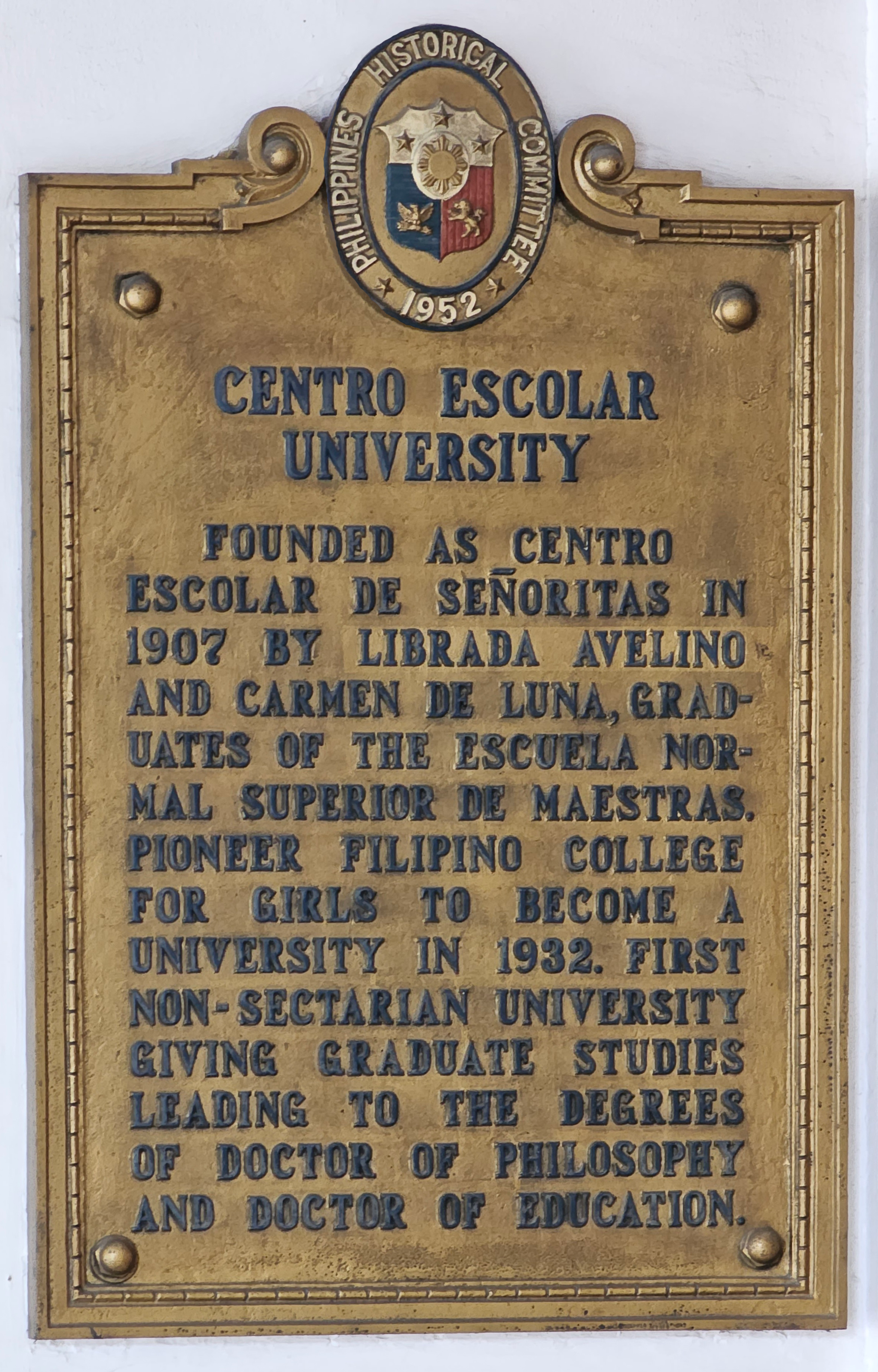
Historical marker installed by the Philippines Historical Committee in 1952

There is also an Integrated School at CEU, which was established upon the university's founding. It was removed from the Mendiola campus in the mid-1990s and in Malolos in 2004 after nearly 100 years open. It was revived starting in the 2014-2015 academic year as the Centro Escolar Integrated School (CEIS) and is offered in Manila, Malolos, and Makati.

There have been eight presidents in the history of CEU: Librada Avelino (1907-1934); Carmen de Luna (1934-1962); Pilar Hidalgo-Lim (1962-1972); Dionisio Tiongco (1972-1992); Lourdes Talagechauz (1992-2002); Rosita L. Navarro (2002-2006); Cristina Padolina (2006-2025), and Danilo Concepcion (2025 - present).

== Campuses ==
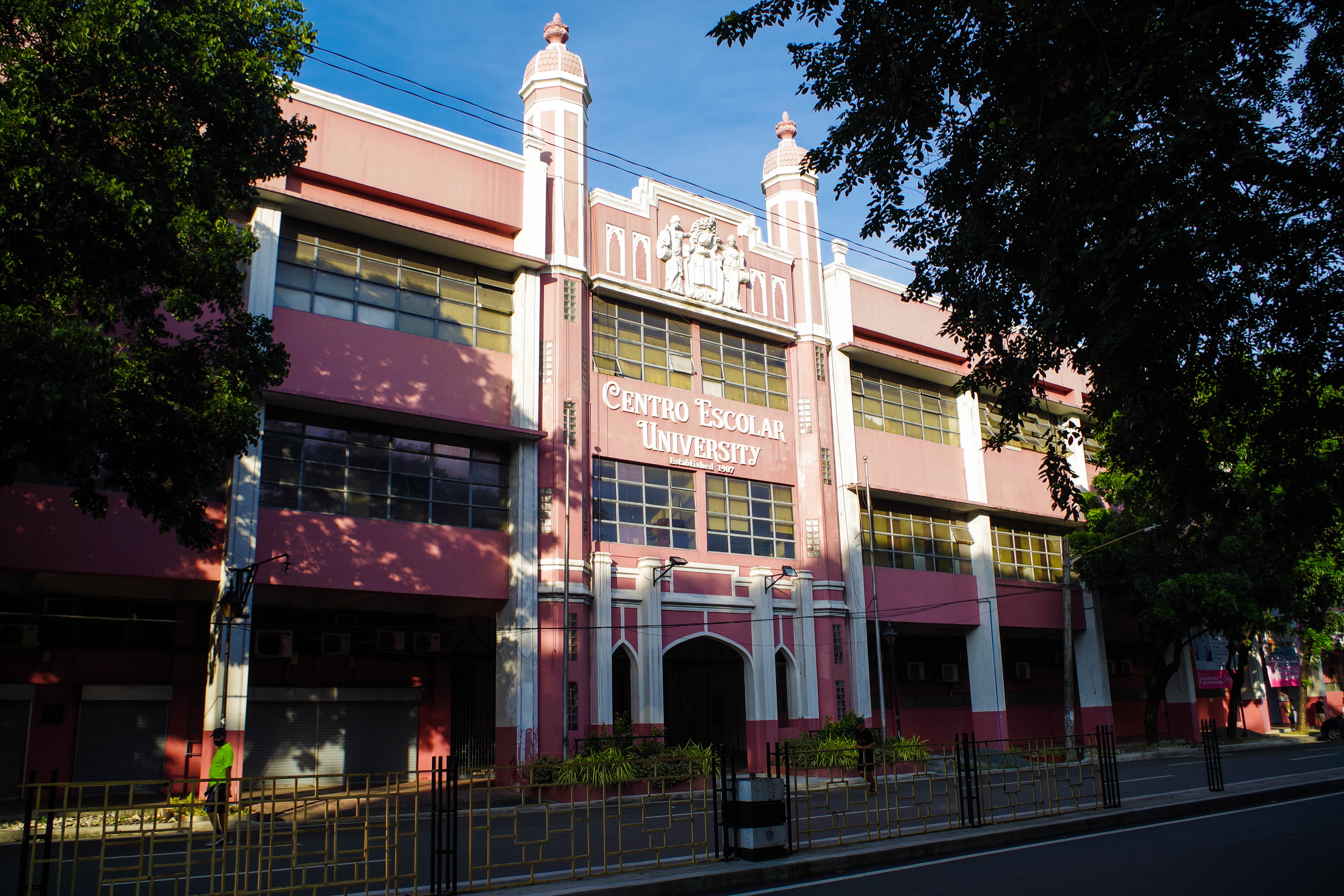
Mendiola, the main campus

CEU has six campuses: the main campus in San Miguel, Manila; the Malolos campus; the Las Piñas campus; the Cebu campus; and the Makati campuses (Gil Puyat and Legaspi). In 2013, CEU expressed interest in expanding to Baguio and Davao City.

- Cebu City - Opened in 2012, the first campus outside of Luzon.
- Las Piñas - Opened in 1975 as Las Piñas College and was acquired by CEU in 2015.
- Makati, Gil Puyat: Opened in 2005. The university is housed within the Philtrust Bank building in Makati's Central Business District.
- Makati, Legazpi Village: Opened in 2007.
- Malolos campus: Opened in 1978. This campus has a teaching hotel called the Ada (after founder Avelino) for the hospitality and tourism program. This campus is also home to the Centrodome, an auditorium that seats 5,000 people.
- Parañaque campus (defunct): The Parañaque campus was phased out in the 1990s.
- Mendiola campus: Mendiola is the university's main campus and is located on Mendiola Street in Manila's University Belt. The university moved here in 1924 from the Sampaloc campus and has a commemorative marker installed by the Philippines Historical Committee in 1952 to memorialize CEU's establishment.
- Sampaloc campus (defunct): When the university started in 1907, it was held in a rented house in the Sampaloc area of Manila. When its student population became too high, it moved to its permanent home in Mendiola.

== Schools ==
- School of Accountancy and Management: Established in 1928 as the College of Commerce. Previous names include the College of Commerce and Business; the College of Commerce and Secretarial Administration; the College of Accountancy, Commerce, and Secretarial Administration; and the School of Accountancy, Business, Secretarial and Public Administration. The business department has honors from CHED for its excellence. The school is based on the Mendiola campus.
- School of Dentistry: Established in 1925. The school is based on the Mendiola campus.
- School of Education, Liberal Arts, Music and Social Work: Established in the late 1990s when four major departments were combined. The school is based on the Mendiola campus.
- School of Law and Jurisprudence: Established in 2009. Faculty have included Supreme Court Associate Justice Jose Midas Marquez, former Chief Presidential Legal Counsel Salvador Panelo, and Chief Justice Alexander Gesmundo. The school is based on the Makati, Gil Puyat campus.
- School of Medical Technology: Established in 1960. The school is based on the Mendiola campus.
- School of Medicine: The school's first graduates finished their degree in 2021 and scored an 80% passing rate. In 2008, CEU established a subsidiary called the Centro Escolar University Hospital, Inc., but no moves have been made to build a teaching hospital. As such, the school works with the Amang Rodriguez Memorial Medical Center. The school is based on the Mendiola campus.
- School of Nursing: Established in 1975. CEU nursing students on the Makati campus earned a 100% passing rate on the licensure exam in 2021. The school is based on the Mendiola campus.
- School of Optometry: Established in 1928. The school has honors from CHED for its excellence; in 2021, CEU optometry students earned the top passing rate of the licensure exam at 93.6%. The school is based on the Mendiola campus.
- School of Pharmacy: Established in 1921, the first higher education program at the university. In 1999, the College of Pharmacy became the School of Pharmacy with the introduction of MS and PhD programs. The BS became available on the Malolos campus in 2001 and the BS and Pharm.D. were available in Makati, Gil Puyat in 2005. It is a founding member of the Philippine Association of the Colleges of Pharmacy and the Asian Association of Schools and Pharmacy. The school is based on the Mendiola campus.
- School of Science and Technology: Established in 1928 as the School of Science. It was the first school in Asia to offer a cosmetic science degree. The school is based on the Mendiola campus.
- School of Nutrition and Hospitality Management: Established as the College of Foods and Nutrition. Previous names include the College of Nutrition and Home Economics (1967); College of Nutrition, Home Economics and Tourism (1989); and the School of Tourism, Family Economics, and Nutrition (2001) before landing on the School of Nutrition and Hospitality Management in 2007. The school is based on the Mendiola campus.

The Graduate School was founded in 1926 during Avelino's presidency, which is the main place for CEU to engage in academic research. CEU Graduate School is the only school in the Philippines that offers a post-doctoral degree in Business Administration-Total Quality Management (TQM).

== Sport ==
CEU offers varsity sports in basketball, volleyball, futsal, cheerleading, badminton, swimming, Taekwondo, and table tennis. Scorpion varsity teams are part of the Men's National Collegiate Athletic Association, the Women's National Collegiate Athletic Association, Universities and Colleges Basketball League, and the National Capital Region Athletic Association and have played competitions in the Philippine Basketball Association D-League, Breakdown, and the Philippine Basketball League. The men's basketball team on the Malolos campus have been part of the Bulacan Collegiate Athletic Association and Private Schools Athletic Association. Recent coaches of men's basketball include Derrick Pumaren (2018-2019), Jeff Napa (2020), and Chico Manabat (2020–present).

== Notable alumni ==
=== Entertainment ===
- Gina Alajar - Tourism and Travel; director and actress
- Nora Aunor - high school (1970s); actress, singer, and producer
- Gabby Concepcion - Dentistry; actor and singer
- Ney Dimaculangan - Conservatory of Music; musician, formerly of 6cyclemind
- Louie Ignacio - BA Mass Communication; director
- June Macasaet - BS Marketing; model and pageant titleholder
- Buenaventura S. Medina Jr. - PhD South East Asian Studies; author
- C. J. Muere - Dentistry; former actor
- Cherry Pie Picache - Dentistry (did not finish); actress
- Daniel Razon - high school (1983), BA Mass Communication (1987) - journalist, TV and radio host, and Overall Servant in the Members Church of God International
- Ryan Rems - BA Communication Arts; TV personality and comedian
- Willie Revillame - high school, Dentistry (did not finish); TV host, actor, and comedian
- Maricar Balagtas - Communications; Binibining Pilipinas Universe 2004
- Shermaine Santiago - Broadcasting; actress, TV host, and singer
- Erik Santos - BS Psychology (2010); singer, actor, and TV host
- Amada Santos Ocampo - BA Music; pianist and composer
- Jay Taruc - Mass Communication (Broadcasting) (late 1990s); journalist
- Darryl Yap - Mass Communication (Broadcasting); film director and screenwriter
- Yllana Aduana - Medical Technology; Environmental Advocate and Miss Earth Air 2023

=== Politics ===
- Concepcion A. Aguila - Master of Law (1926), Master of Arts (1937) - lawyer, pedagogist, former Executive Director and Dean at CEU, and former UN regional chairman
- Lani Cayetano - BA Mass Communication (1991); Mayor of Taguig (2010-2019, 2022–present); former Representative of the Legislative district of Pateros-Taguig, House of Representatives (2007–2010)
- Aurora Cruz Ignacio- BS major in Commerce, Banking and Finance; SSS President and Chief Executive Officer (2019)
- Alicia dela Rosa Bala- BS Social Work; Chairperson of the Civil Service Commission (CSC) (2015)
- Gwendolyn Ecleo - Doctor of Dental Medicine (2001); former mayor of Dinagat Township (2004-2013)
- Dan Fernandez - Doctor of Optometry (1986); former actor and incumbent Member of the House of Representatives, Lone District of Santa Rosa, Laguna
- Minerva G. Laudico - BS Social Work (1930s); first women's sectoral representative in the Philippines' House of Representatives, and former president of the United Nations Association of the Philippines.
- Salvador Laurel - elementary (1933-1935); former Vice President of the Philippines
- Laarni A. Malibiran - AB in Mass Communication in Broadcasting and Teaching (2000–2008)
- Fidel V. Ramos - high school (1930s); Doctor of Laws (Honoris Causa) (1987); former President of the Philippines, 1992–1998.

=== Religion ===
- Rolando Tirona - elementary (1952), high school (1958); Archbishop of Caceres

=== Sports ===
- Alvin Abundo - Hotel and Restaurant Management; PBA player for NorthPort Batang Pier
- Misagh Bahadoran - Dentistry (2010); footballer with Maharlika Manila F.C., futsal player on the Philippines national team
- Vergel Meneses - Integrated School; mayor of Bulakan (2019–present), retired PBA player
- Janine Pontejos - Business Administration; professional WNBL player, Philippine national team member, current basketball coach of the CEU Lady Scorpions
