= Buenaventura S. Medina Jr. =

Filipino writer (born 1928)

- Born: Buenaventura S. Medina Jr. December 1, 1928 (age 97)
- Occupations: Author, critic, professor

Academic background
- Education: Far Eastern University (BA, MA); Centro Escolar University (PhD)

Buenaventura S. Medina Jr. (born December 1, 1928) is a Filipino author of more than twenty-five books, mostly novels and books on criticism. In 1974, Medina rediscovered a manuscript of Francisco Balagtas' 19th century play Orosman at Zafira at the Philippine National Library after it was presumed lost for over a century.

Aside from his published works, which include: Pintig (1969), Gantimpala (1972), Confrontations, Past and Present in Philippine Literature (1974), The Primal Passion, Tagalog Literature in the Nineteenth (1976), Francisco Baltazar's Orosman at Zafira (1991) and Moog and Alaga (1993), Medina has been awarded for his essays and short stories. He has also worked as an editor of magazines such as the Free Press.

Although he obtained his BA and MA in English (Far Eastern University) as well as his Ph.D. in South East Asian Studies (Centro Escolar University) from Philippines Universities, his work has not been limited to the Philippines. He has presented various papers at international conferences in Japan and Thailand.

Aside from being inducted into the Don Carlos Palanca Memorial Awards Hall of Fame in 1995, he was honored with the South East Asia Writer Award in 1994 (SEAWRITE) and A Gawad Pambansang Alagad ni Balagtas Ward for Literary Criticism.

He has served as a professor at the Far Eastern University, the Ateneo de Manila University, and the De La Salle University.
