= Angelo Jimenez =

Filipino lawyer

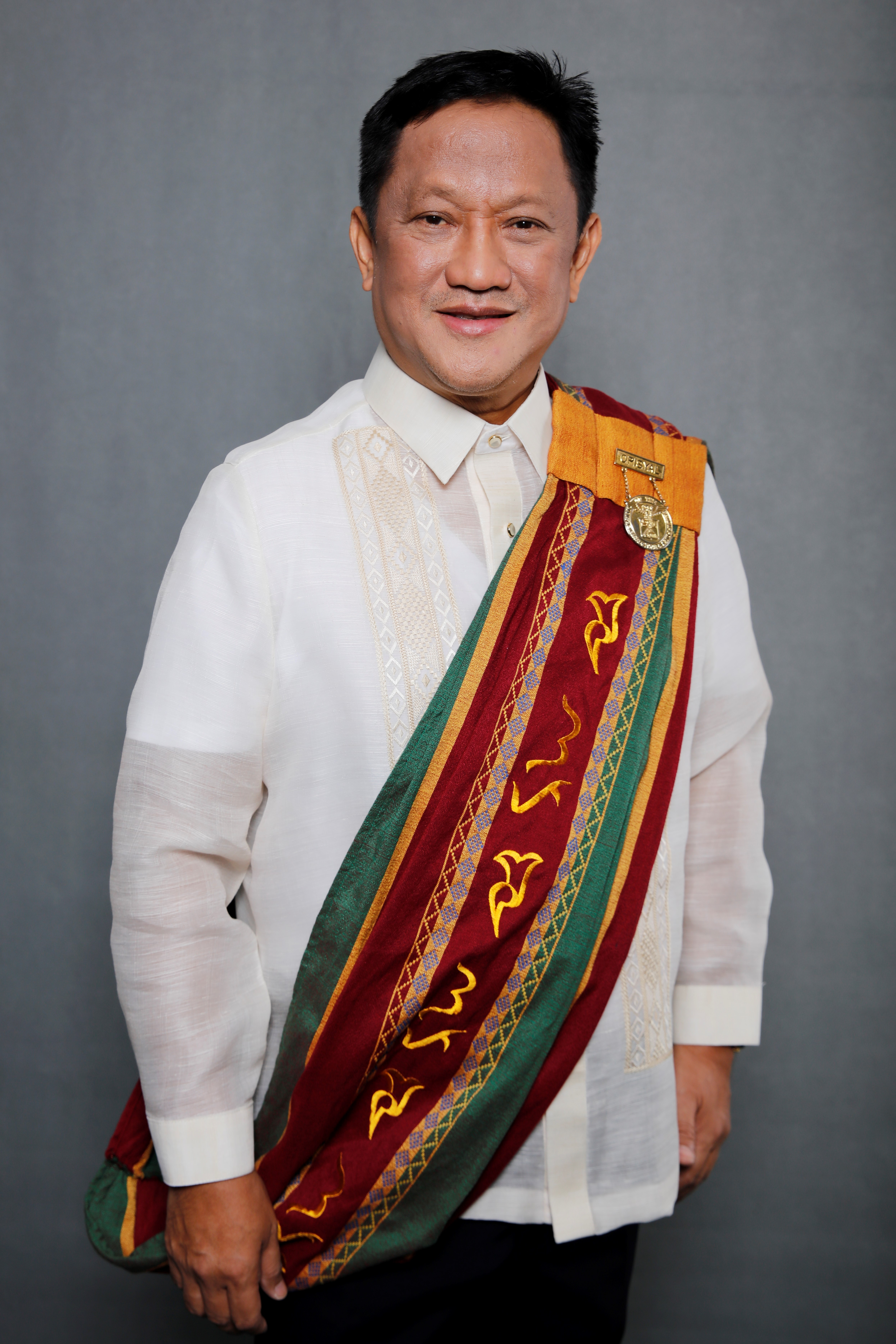

22nd President of the University of the Philippines
- Incumbent
- Assumed office February 10, 2023
- Preceded by: Danilo Concepcion

Personal details
- Children: Aaron Atticus V. Jimenez
- Education: University of the Philippines Diliman (BA, LLB); Lee Kuan Yew School of Public Policy (MPM)
- Occupation: Lawyer; university administrator

Angelo Azura Jimenez is a Filipino lawyer who is the 22nd president of the University of the Philippines.

== Education ==
Jimenez earned his sociology and law degrees from the University of the Philippines Diliman. In 1985, he became a member of the Alpha Phi Beta Fraternity. He passed the Bar examination in 1994.

He later became a Lee Kuan Yew Fellow of the Harvard Kennedy School of Government. He received his master's degree in public management from the Lee Kuan Yew School of Public Policy at the National University of Singapore.

== Career ==
=== Law ===
Jimenez is an Of counsel with the Jaromay Laurente and Associates and a consultant of a House member.

=== Academe ===
Jimenez served on the University of the Philippines (UP) Board of Regents twice: as a student regent (1992) and as a regent (2016–2021). He was a lecturer at the UP Law Center Institute of the Administration of Justice (2016–2021).

=== Government service ===
Jimenez is an expert on Philippine overseas labor issues and global migration. He served in the Overseas Workers Welfare Administration as an acting deputy administrator, as well as in the Department of Labor and Employment. He also served as labor attaché in Japan.

He received two presidential citations for his efforts to protect Overseas Filipino Workers in the Middle East.

=== Media ===
Jimenez is an opinion writer on ABS-CBN News website.

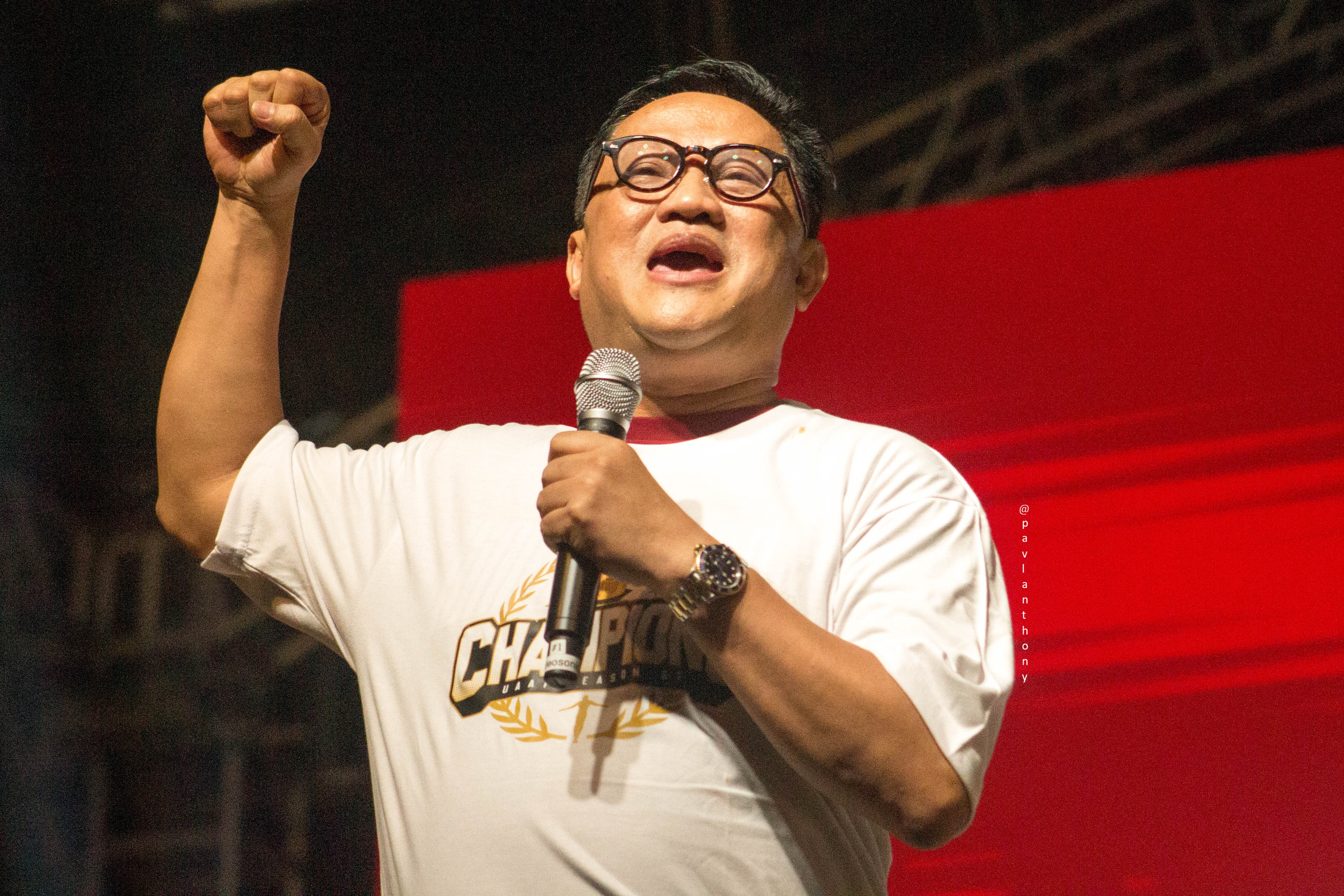
Angelo Jimenez sharing a message during the UAAP Season 87

=== UP president ===
In December 2022, Jimenez was elected by the UP Board of Regents as the 22nd university president over five other nominees. His term began on February 10, 2023.

On May 14, 2024, Jimenez proclaimed University of the Philippines's new logo and “Honor, Excellence, Service” motto.

Academic offices
Preceded by Danilo Concepcion	President of the University of the Philippines; 2023–present	Incumbent
Order of precedence
Preceded by Fernanda Lampas-Peralta as Presiding Justice of the Court of Appeals	Order of Precedence of the Philippines as President of the University of the Philippines	Succeeded by Gen. Antonio Nafarrete, AFP as Chief of Staff of the Armed Forces of the Philippines
