= Rosita L. Navarro =

Rosita Lozano-Navarro is a Filipino educator. She was the sixth President and Chief Academic Officer of Centro Escolar University (CEU) in Manila, Philippines from 2001 to 2006. She was also the former Luzon Representative on the Teacher Education Council of the Department of Education of the Philippines. She graduated from CEU with the degree of Bachelor of Science in Education, major in English (summa cum laude). She obtained her M.A. in English and Ph.D. in Curriculum and Supervision also from CEU. She is also a member of the faculty as a professor in the Graduate School and in the School of Education, Liberal Arts, Music and Social Work. She is currently the Dean Emeritus of Graduate School, Senior Adviser on Quality Assurance to current President Dr. Cristina Padolina and the Chairman of Philippine Association of Colleges and Universities Commission on Accreditation (PACUCOA).

Navarro has won several awards, including the "Outstanding Professional Teacher", awarded by the Professional Regulation Commission, and the "Outstanding Professional in the Field of Teaching", awarded by The Philippine Federation of Professional Association. She was awarded “Outstanding Professional in the Field of Teaching” by the Professional Regulation Commission (PRC) in 2000.

== See also ==
- Centro Escolar University
