= Marion Manley =

- Born: April 29, 1893; Junction City, Kansas, U.S.
- Died: 1984
- Education: University of Illinois
- Occupation: Architect
- Awards: Member Emeritus American Institute of Architects
- Projects: University of Miami campus

Marion Isadore Manley FAIA (April 29, 1893 – February 1984) was an American architect, the second woman registered to practice in Florida, and the thirteenth female member of the American Institute of Architects.

== Biography ==
Manley was born in Junction City, Kansas, in 1893. After she graduated from the University of Illinois, she moved to Miami, Florida, in 1917 where she practised for almost 50 years, contributing to the development of the urban environment. So rare were female architects at the time that when she joined the American Institute of Architects, her acceptance letter and some later correspondence were addressed to 'Mr. Marion Manley'.

Manley was one of the designers of the University of Miami campus. Her commissions also included small Spanish-style houses in the 1920s, work on Miami's U.S. Post Office and Federal Building in the 1930s, the masterplan for the Coral Gables, Florida campus of the University of Miami with Robert Law Weed and its first large classroom building in the 1940s, many "tropical modern" houses, the University of Miami's Jerry Herman Ring Theatre, and the shell for the Asolo Theater at the Ringling Museum in the 1950s. She continued to work through the 1960s and early 1970s.

Manley's work encompassed vernacular architecture in residential and public buildings as she drew on local materials suitable for use in the tropical climate of South Florida.

== Honors ==
Manley was twice the President of the American Institute of Architects' South Florida chapter, as well as twice Vice President of the Florida Association of Architects. She received the Gold Medal Award in 1973 from the Florida Association of the American Institute of Architects. In 1956, she was elected to the College of Fellows, and on December 1, 1966, she was elected Member Emeritus by the American Institute of Architects.

== See also ==
- Agnes Ballard, the first woman AIA from Florida and first registered woman architect in the state
- Ida Annah Ryan, the second woman AIA from Florida
- Women in architecture
