= Danilo Concepcion =

Filipino lawyer, professor, and university administrator

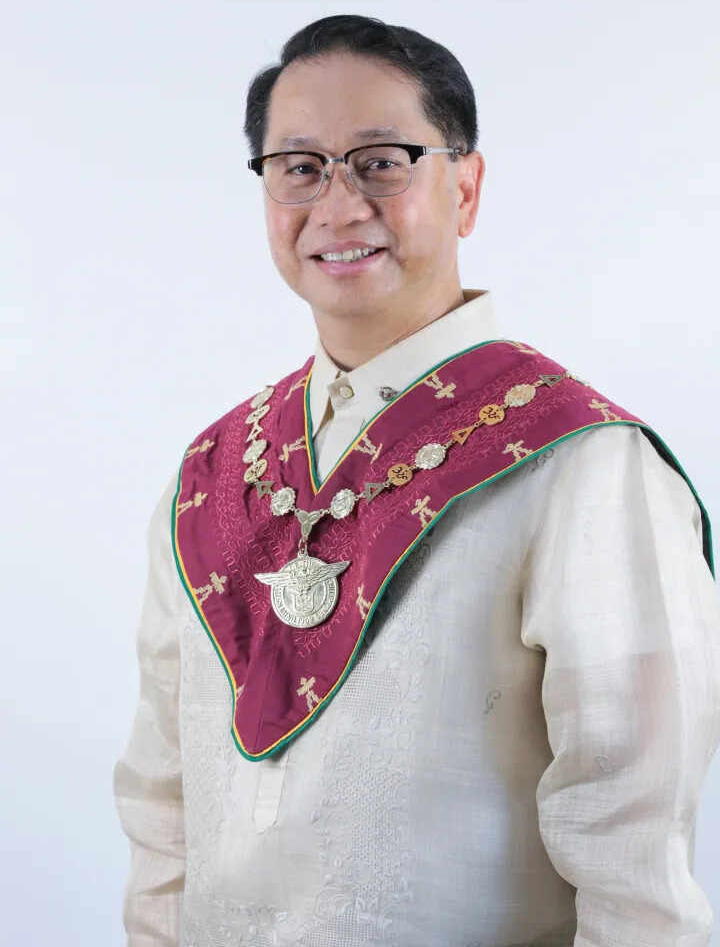

8th President of Centro Escolar University
- Incumbent
- Assumed office March 26, 2026
- Preceded by: Cristina Padolina

21st President of the University of the Philippines
- Preceded by: Alfredo E. Pascual
- Succeeded by: Angelo Jimenez

14th Dean of the UP College of Law
- In office June 3, 2011 – January 26, 2017
- Preceded by: Marvic Leonen
- Succeeded by: Fides C. Cordero-Tan

Associate Dean of the UP College of Law and Head of UP Law Center
- In office 2002–2006

President of De La Salle Araneta University
- In office 2000–2002

Associate Commissioner of the Securities and Exchange Commission
- In office 1996–2000

Mambabatas Pambansa (Assemblyman) for the Luzon Youth Sector
- In office 1978–1984 Serving with Rogelio C. Peyuan

Personal details
- Born: Danilo Lardizabal Concepcion; February 10, 1958 (age 68)
- Spouse: Gaby Roldan
- Education: De La Salle Araneta University (B.Sc., 1979); University of the Philippines Diliman (LL.B., 1983); Queen Mary University of London (LL.M., 1986)
- Occupation: Lawyer; university administrator; professor; radio and TV personality

Danilo Lardizabal Concepcion (born February 7, 1958), often referred to by his nickname DaniCon, is a Filipino lawyer who is the eighth and incumbent president of Centro Escolar University, the second male to assume the position. He previously served as the 21st president of the University of the Philippines. Prior to his appointment as UP president, he was the dean and a professor of law at the UP College of Law and the Executive Director of the UP Bonifacio Global City Campus. He is husband to lawyer Gaby Concepcion.

== Early life and education ==
Concepcion graduated valedictorian from the Bancal Elementary School in Meycauayan, Bulacan in 1970. In 1974, he graduated as the high school valedictorian of the Basic Education Unit of De La Salle Araneta University in Malabon, where he also received the Most Outstanding Campus Journalist, Gerry Roxas Leadership Gold Medal, and Gold Eagle Award for Community Development.

He then took up B.S. agricultural engineering in the same university and graduated summa cum laude in 1979. He received his Bachelor of Laws degree from the University of the Philippines College of Law at Diliman in 1983, graduating cum laude, and is a member of the Upsilon Sigma Phi. He passed the bar examination on the same year. He finished his Master of Laws in Queen Mary University of London in 1986 as a Chevening Scholar of the United Kingdom government.

He attended a Summer Course in International Law of the Sea at the University of Oxford in 1986 and a Finance for Senior Executives course in Asian Institute of Management in 2000.

== Career ==
=== Academe ===
Concepcion started as faculty of Siena College in 1985. He served as Bar reviewer in Corporation and Civil Law at the UP Law Center Bar Review School and bar reviewer in Civil Law at the San Sebastian College School of Law and Adamson University College of Law. After serving as President of De La Salle Araneta University, he returned in 2002 to become Associate Dean of the University of the Philippines College of Law, Head of the UP Law Center and Director of the Institute of Judicial Administration until May 2006. He was appointed as Vice-President for Legal Affairs of the University of the Philippines in February 2011 and was elected as the 14th Dean of the College of Law on June 3, 2011.

=== Government service ===
Concepcion served as member of the Sangguniang Bayan of Valenzuela and President of the Kabataang Barangay Federation of Metro Manila from 1976 to 1978. He was elected as the Youth Sector representative in the Interim Batasang Pambansa from 1978 to 1984. He also served as member of the Philippine delegation to the Asia Pacific Parliamentarian's Union (APPU) Conference held in Republic of Nauru in 1979, Vice chairman of the Philippine Youth delegation to the People's Republic of China in 1979, and member of the Philippine delegation to the Inter-Parliamentary Union Spring Conference in Lagos, Nigeria in 1982. He served as Chief of Staff of the Chief Presidential Legal Counsel Office of the President in 1996 as well as associate commissioner of the Securities and Exchange Commission from 1996 until his resignation in 2000 to serve as President of De La Salle Araneta University.

=== Law practice ===
He served as corporate receiver of Daikin-Alen Air Corditioning, Inc., Rehabilation receiver of Ariel Meat Products; Epixtar, Inc.; Capital Wireless, Inc.; Reynolds (Phil.) Inc. and as Securities and Exchange Commission commissioner-in-charge of the rehabilitation of the Victorias Milling Corporation.

He is presently serving as a member of the editorial board of the IBP Law Journal, arbitrator in the Ad Hoc Arbitration cases with the Philippine Dispute Resolution Center, Inc., Liquidator of several companies National Steel Corporation; Bacnotan Steel Industries, Inc.; EYCO Group of Companies; Rubberworld (Philippines), Inc.; East Asia Capital; Winsource Solutions, Inc.; Advent Capital Corporations; PET Plans, Inc. Corporate Counsel of Gordon Dario Reyes Hocson & Viado Law Office and of Tan & Concepcion Law Firm.

=== UP president ===
In 2016, the UP Board of Regents elected Concepcion for the role as president. Other nominees included Gisela Concepcion (UP vice president for academic affairs), Rowena Cristina Guevarra, (former dean of the College of Engineering, UP Diliman and Department of Science and Technology undersecretary for research and development), Benito Pacheco (UP Diliman vice chancellor for academic affairs), Prospero de Vera III (Commission on Higher Education Commissioner and public administration professor), and Caesar Saloma (former UP Diliman chancellor and National Institute of Physics professor). His term ended in February 2023.

During his term, among the university's significant achievements are the institutionalization of sixty new degree programs across the UP system and the development of data science and artificial intelligence programs.

In August 2018, a reunion of the Kabataang Barangay (KB) led by Imee Marcos was held in the University of the Philippines Diliman, which Concepcion attended as a former KB chairman. His presence provoked criticism from opponents of the Marcos regime. As a response, Concepcion has expressed regret and apologized to the UP community while reassuring his commitment to upholding the truth in the harm caused by Martial Law during the Marcos Regime. Concepcion was president of the KB Federation in Metro Manila from 1976 to 1978.

On January 15, 2021, Defense Secretary Delfin Lorenzana officially notified Concepcion of the Department of National Defense (DND)'s unilateral termination of the 1989 UP–DND accord, which requires police and military to give prior notice to the UP administration before they enter UP campuses. The secretary's letter was made public on the night of January 18, and protests erupted the next day. Concepcion revealed that the agreement was terminated "without prior consultation" with the university administration. He called the abrogation "totally unnecessary and unwarranted, and may result in worsening rather than improving relations between our institutions". He also defended the UP–DND accord saying it "gives our students and teachers the freedom to be creative in the way they think and act because they know that no one can suppress their actions".

=== CEU president ===
In April 2025, Centro Escolar University announced Concepcion's appointment as its eighth President and Chief Academic Officer. He is the second man to be appointed as President of the university. He succeeded Cristina Padolina, who has been designated as President Emeritus. He formally took office and was installed as president on March 26, 2026 at the CEU Manila campus.

Academic offices
Preceded by Cristina Padolina	President of the Centro Escolar University; 2026–present	Incumbent
Preceded by Alfredo E. Pascual	President of the University of the Philippines; 2017–2023	Succeeded by Angelo Jimenez
