= Carmen de Luna =

Filipina educator

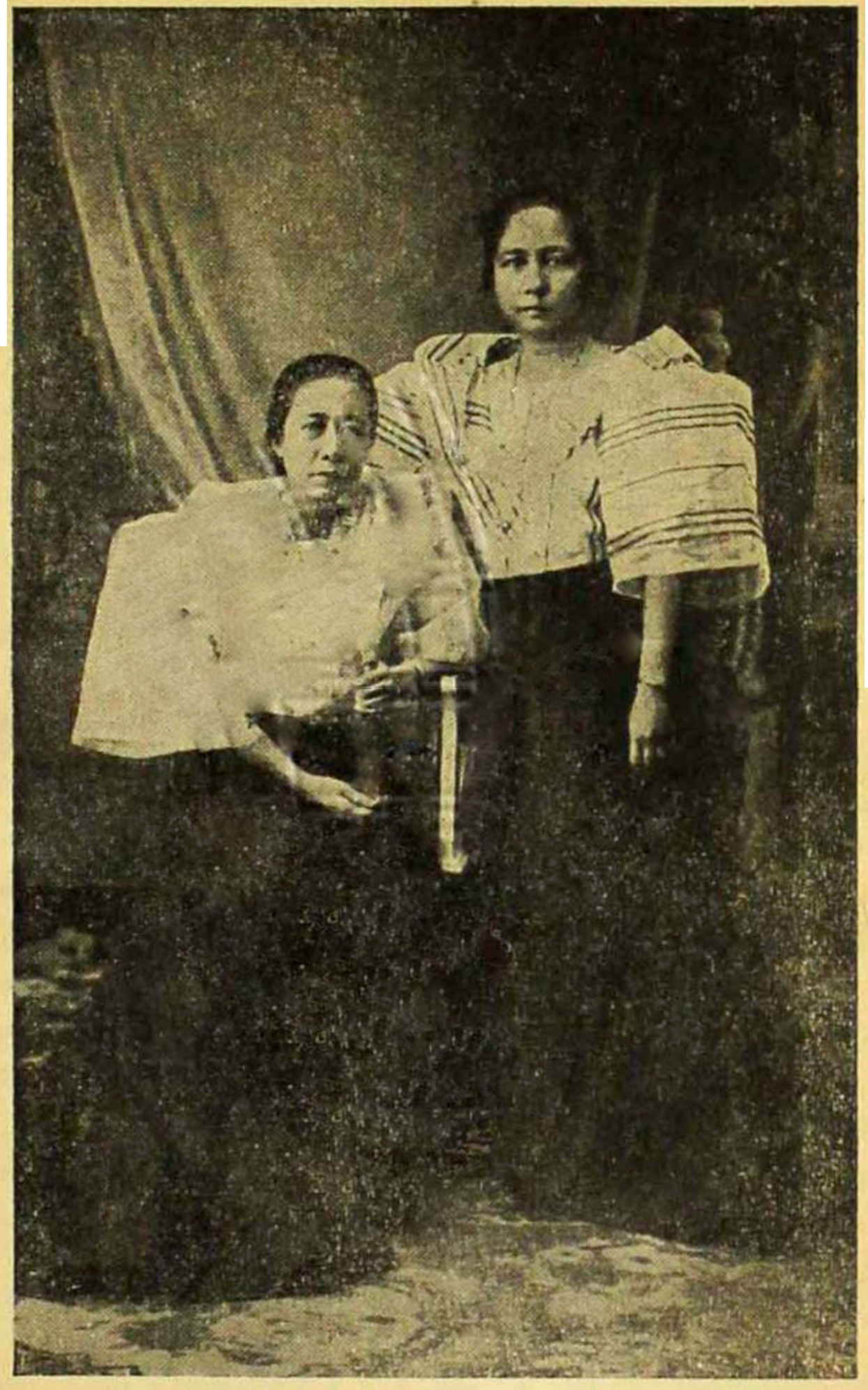
- Liberada Avelino (left) with de Luna in 1911
- Born: Carmen de Luna Villajuan; July 16, 1873; San Miguel, Manila, Captaincy General of the Philippines
- Died: November 4, 1962 (aged 89); Manila, Republic of the Philippines
- Resting place: Centro Escolar University Catholic Chapel, San Miguel, Manila
- Occupations: teacher, school founder
- Years active: 1907–1962

Carmen de Luna Villajuan (July 16, 1873 – November 4, 1962) was a Filipina educator and co-founded the Centro Escolar University. After completing her own education to train as a teacher, de Luna taught at the private school run by Librada Avelino in Manila and the Pandacan Public Girls' School. In 1907, the two women, along with Fernando Salas founded the Centro Escolar de Señoritas, as a non-sectarian educational facility for girls. Acting as assistant director from 1907 to 1934, she assumed the directorship upon Avelido's death and led the university until her own death in 1962.

For her work with civic and charitable organizations and lifelong commitment to education, de Luna was honored with the Philippine Presidential Medal of Merit, the Vatican's Pro Ecclesia et Pontifice medal, as well as recognition from Spain for her work in preserving Spanish culture and language. A historical marker in recognition of her was placed at the Centro Escolar University by the National Historical Commission of the Philippines.

== Early life ==
Carmen de Luna Villajuan was born on July 16, 1873, in San Miguel, Manila, in the Philippine Islands, which at the time was part of the Spanish Empire, to Ignacia Villajuan and Sebastian de Luna. She attended a Catholic boarding school operated by Anacleta Abrera in Binondo, earning her elementary teaching certificate in 1890. To continue her education, de Luna enrolled in the course offered by the sisters of the Assumption Convent, where she met fellow student Librada Avelino, who would become her collaborator and companion for the rest of her life. She graduated in 1894 and that same year passed the government examination to obtain her teaching license as a secondary school teacher.

== Career ==
In 1896, de Luna's friend Librada Avelino was loaned a property in Santa Cruz in which to open a school. As the school grew, it moved from Fernandez Street to San Sebastian Street and de Luna, and Avelino's cousin Margarita "Garit" Oliva joined Avelino, as teachers in the school. At the end of the Philippine Revolution, the school closed because the new United States authorities changed the educational curricula throughout the country requiring that courses be taught in English. In 1901, the two friends traveled to Hong Kong to improve their English and after a 6 month stay, returned to the Philippines. Avelino was employed as the principal of the Pandacan Public Girls' School and de Luna worked for her as a teacher. De Luna continued her education and earned a bachelor's degree of Arts and Sciences in 1907.

That same year, DeLuna and Avelino sought the advice of Fernando Salas, a lawyer from a family of educators, about opening a school for women, modeled after the Centro Escolar de Varones (Central School of Men), which Salas was operating. They decided to invest (Note: While Varona and de la Llana state the three founders and initial donors were Avelino, de Luna and Salas, Artigas y Cuerva says that the initial investment of ₱1,000 was divided between Avelino, de Luna, María de Salas, (Fernando's wife?) and Josué Soncuya. Avelino died intestate and in a lawsuit which followed Soncuya, the plaintiff alleged that in 1910, he, Avelino and de Luna organized the corporation "Centro Escolar de Señoritas". This would indicate Soncuya was not one of the initial founders, but invested three years after the school was opened in 1907.) in the founding of a school in Manila which would be called the Centro Escolar de Señoritas (Central School of Ladies). Each contributed ₱250 and began to organize a non-sectarian school located at 841 Iris Street, later called Azcarraga Street. Avelino, De Luna, and Oliva all intended to teach and they hired other women who had graduated from various normal schools, such as sisters Filomena and Ildefonsa Amor; Constancia P. Arrieta; Maria del Pilar Francisco, the first woman lawyer in the Philippines; and Felisa and Domingo Francisco, cousins of Maria. Salas' teacher candidates included Josué Soncuya, a historian and lawyer; Manuel Ravago, a journalist and orator; and Alberto Campos, a former soldier in the Spanish army, and a journalist and educator. After proposing his candidates, Salas withdrew from the venture and retrieved his investment funds.

The initial board of the Centro Escolar de Señoritas included Avelino as director, de Luna as assistant director, María Francisco as secretary, Felisa Francisco as treasurer and Oliva as administrator. The course offerings which began with girls' education from kindergarten to high school, expanded in 1921 to offer tertiary courses. In 1930, the Centro Escolar de Señoritas officially became a university and two years later was incorporated as the Centro Escolar University. When Avelino died in 1934, de Luna took over the direction of the institution and would continue in that post until her own death. After the liberation of the Philippines in World War II, the university became co-educational in 1945, making de Luna the only woman in the country to head a university which taught female and male students.

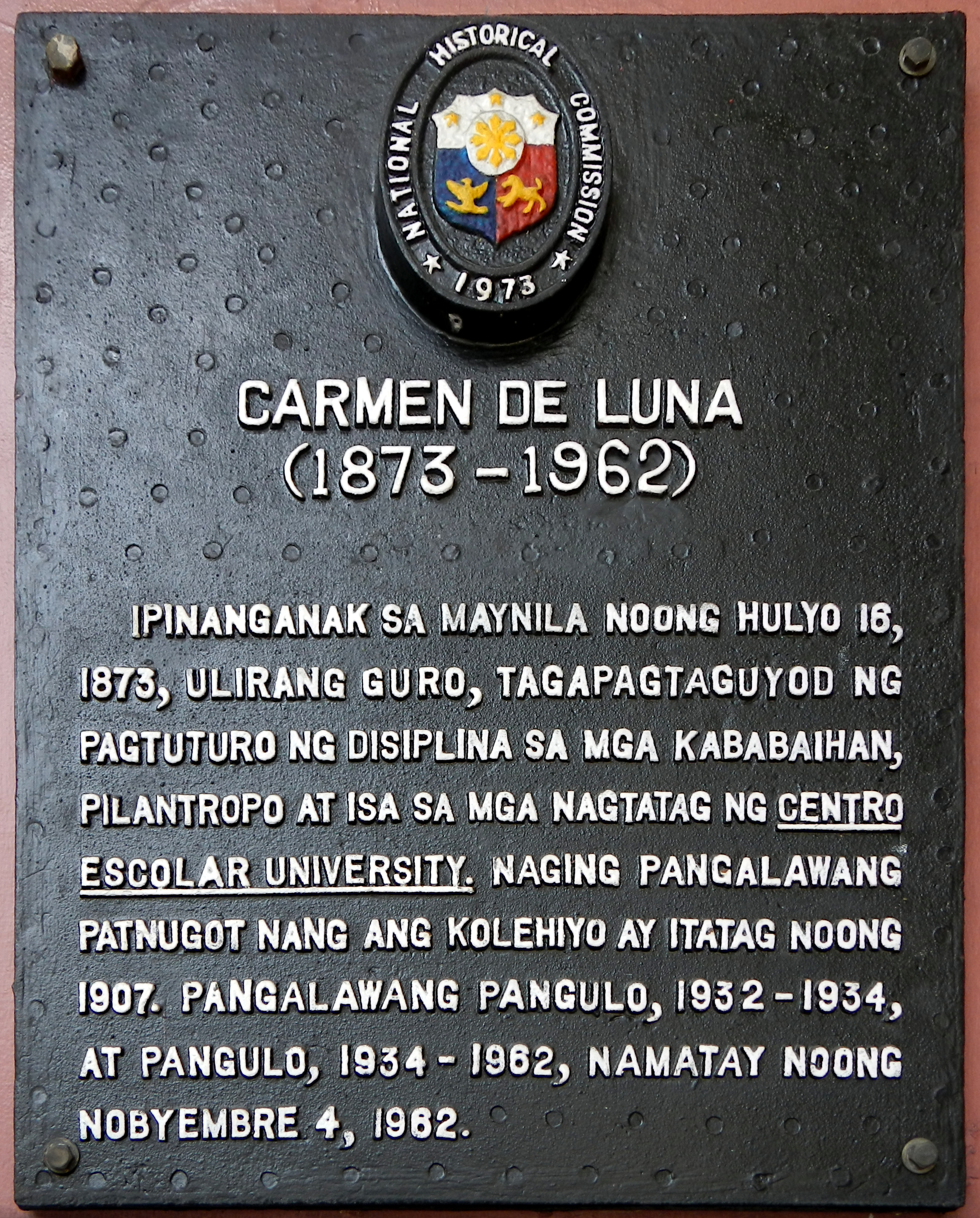
Historical marker at Centro Escolar University, Manila

In addition to her work at the university, de Luna De Luna was actively involved in the Liga de Mujeres Filipinas (Philippine Women's League), which aimed to equalize the civic and socio-economic opportunities afforded to women. She worked with numerous civic and charitable organizations including La Gota de Leche and the Abbey of Our Lady of Montserrat, which operated San Beda College; as well as various Catholic charities. Her work among youth was recognized by President Elpidio Quirino in 1949, who bestowed upon her the Presidential Medal of Merit, the year the honor was inaugurated. That same year, she was honored by Pope Pius XII, who awarded her the Pro Ecclesia et Pontifice medal for her leadership and service to the Catholic church. In 1950, she received recognition in the form of a Medal and Diploma of Merit from the Spanish government for her work to preserve the Spanish culture and language of the Philippines. For her lifetime of service as a civic leader and educator, de Luna was recognized by President Carlos P. Garcia in 1961.

== Death and legacy ==
De Luna died on November 4, 1962, in Manila, Republic of the Philippines. The National Historical Commission of the Philippines affixed a plaque to honor her at the Centro Escolar University in 1973.

== Centro Escolar University ==
Carmen de Luna Villajuan was one of the two founders of Centro Escolar University, together with Librada Avelino. It was founded on June 3, 1907, under the name Centro Escolar de Señoritas. It was established to educate students about becoming ideal women, intelligent citizenship, and democratic leadersship guided by the standards of science and virtue.

In 1930, the school began operating as a university. In 1932, it was incorporated and its name was changed to Centro Escolar University. The university's motto is “Ciencia y Virtud” (Science and Virtue).
