= Concepcion Aguila =

Filipino educator and lawyer (1894–1959)

- NHI historical marker
- Born: September 11, 1894; San Jose, Batangas
- Died: December 16, 1959 (aged 65)
- Education: Philippine Law School (LL.B.); Centro Escolar University (LL.M.), (M.A.); Georgetown University (Ph.D.)
- Occupations: Educator; Lawyer

Concepcion Aguila (September 11, 1894 – December 16, 1959) was a Filipino educator and lawyer.

== Early life and education ==
Aguila was born on September 11, 1894, in San Jose, Batangas. She completed primary education at a public school in Batangas.

Aguila became a kindergarten teacher before she obtained a Bachelor of Laws degree in 1924 from the Philippine Law School in Manila. She pursued postgraduate studies at Centro Escolar University (CEU) in Manila and graduated with a Master of Laws in 1926 and a Master of Arts in 1937.

Aguila later went to Georgetown University in Washington, D.C., USA, and received a PhD in Political Science in 1948, making her the first woman and international student to receive the said doctoral degree from the university.

== Professional life ==
After studying in the US, Aguila returned to the Philippines. She worked as a teacher at CEU and later on became the dean of the university's graduate school.

In the early 1950s, Aguila was active in the United Nations assemblies and conferences. She published a book, Educational Legislation, in 1956 and received the Outstanding International Teacher award from the General Federation of Women's Clubs in 1958.

Aguila died of cancer on December 16, 1959.

== Recognitions ==
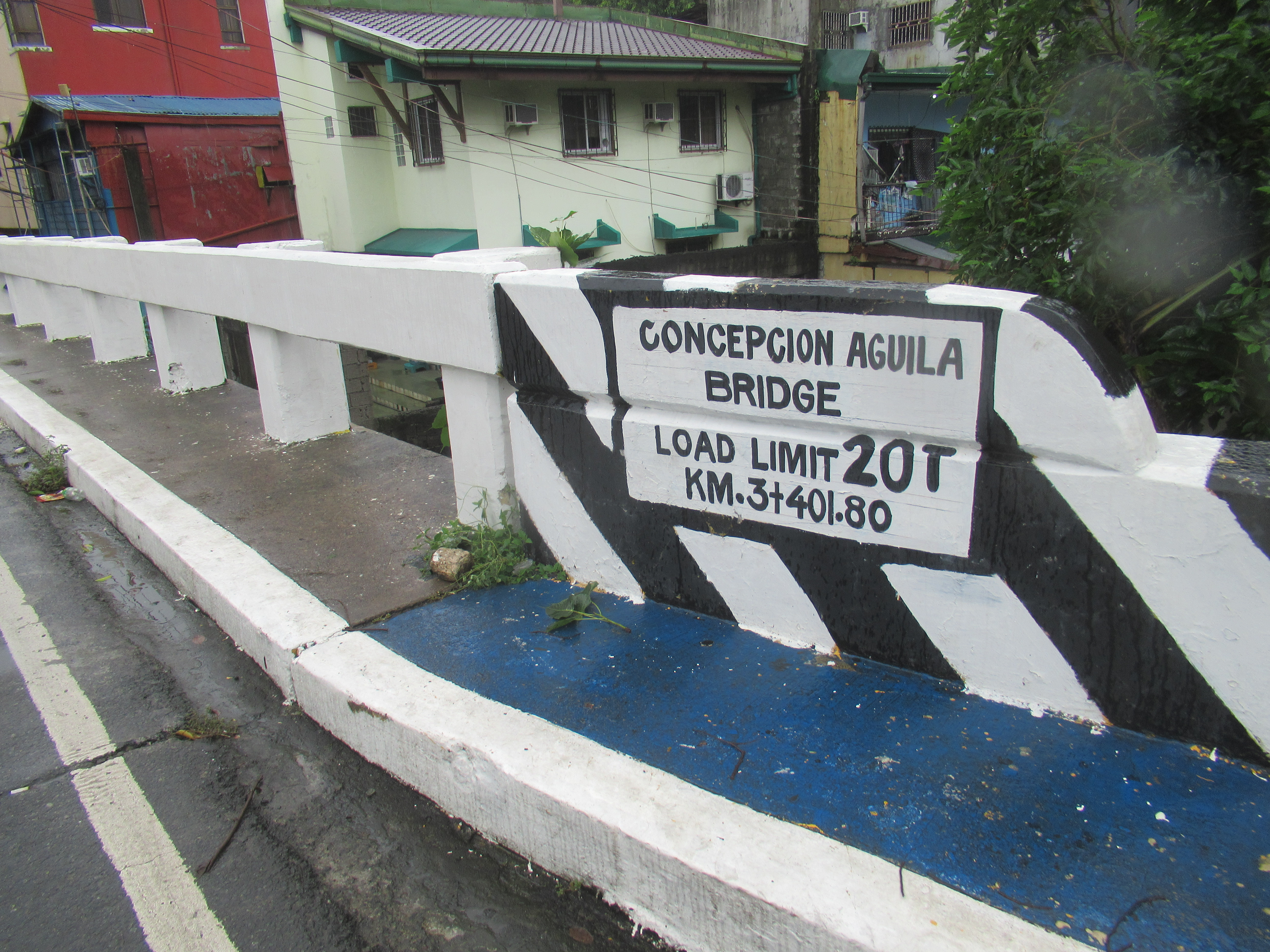
Concepcion Aguila bridge signage

In 1993, the National Historical Institute (NHI), now the National Historical Commission of the Philippines, installed a historical marker in CEU to recognize Aguila. In addition, several public infrastructures in Manila, including a street and a bridge, are named after her.
