= Agnes Ballard =

American architect and educator (1877–1969)

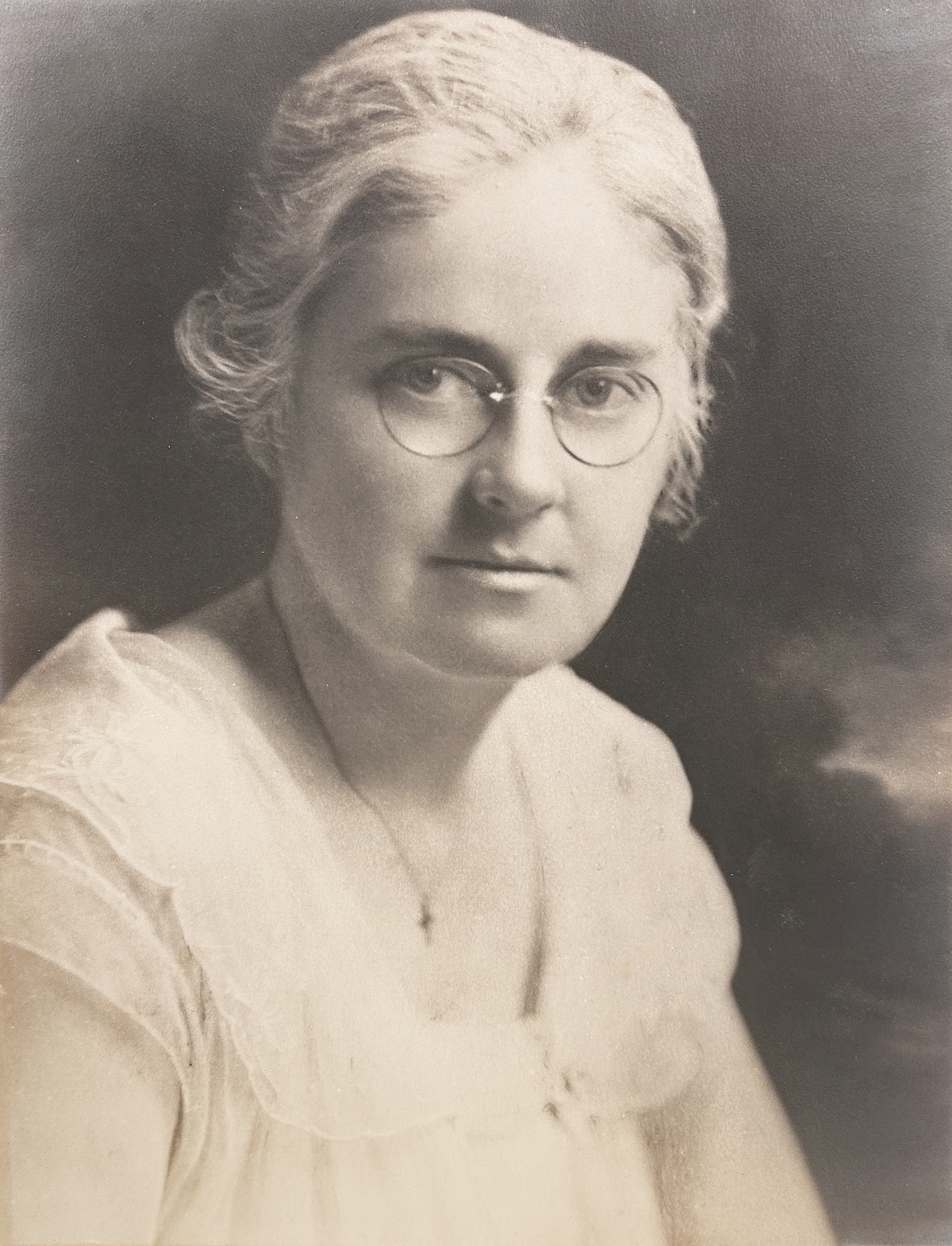
- Ballard in 1920
- Born: September 14, 1877; Oxford, Massachusetts, US
- Died: November 24, 1969 (aged 92); West Palm Beach, Florida, US
- Occupations: Architect, educator
- Years active: 1906–1957

Agnes Ballard (September 14, 1877 – November 24, 1969) was an American architect and educator. She was the first female registered architect in Florida, the sixth woman admitted to the American Institute of Architects and the first from Florida. As an educator, she taught geography, biology, chemistry, Latin and mathematics in West Palm Beach, Florida. Ballard was also one of the first women to be elected to a public office in Florida, serving as Superintendent of Public Education for Palm Beach County, Florida for four years.

== Biography ==
Agnes Ballard was born in Oxford, Massachusetts, on September 14, 1877, the daughter of Dana L. Ballard and Jane R. Carpenter, both originally from Vermont. She attended public schools in Worcester, Massachusetts, and went on to attend Wellesley College in 1902. She graduated from Worcester Normal School (a teacher training college) in 1905.

=== Early teaching career ===
Seeking a challenge after graduation she took a teaching job in Palmer, Michigan, but found she disliked the cold weather there. "I saw so much snow In one season I wanted to go somewhere where I never would see snow again." So, in 1906, at age 29, she moved to West Palm Beach, Florida, where she got a job teaching geography, biology and chemistry at Palm Beach High School. In 1908, she moved to a nearby private school opened by Grace Lainhart, where she taught Latin and mathematics.

Seeking a higher salary, she again moved north in 1910, this time to White Plains, New York, but again found the snow was not for her. She returned to Florida to teach in St. Augustine. She moved north once more when she became a private secretary (for the local YWCA, and then an Episcopal church) in La Crosse, Wisconsin. She would soon return to Florida for good, but this time not as a teacher.

=== Switch to architecture ===
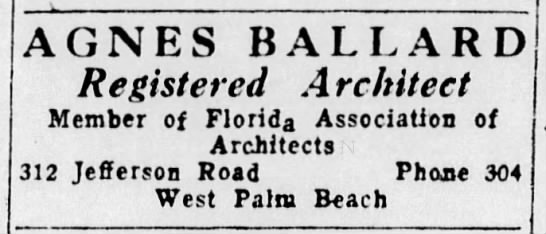
A 1916 newspaper ad for Ballard's business

During her time in La Crosse, she had apprenticed at the architectural firm of Percy Dwight Bentley. In 1913, she returned to Florida and continued to study architecture. In 1914, she was granted architecture license No. 6 by the State of Florida. She was not only the first woman to be a licensed architect in the state, but she received the first license beyond those the five-member licensing board in Tallahassee issued to themselves. In 1916, she became only the sixth woman to be granted membership in the American Institute of Architects. She ran an ad in the local city directory and became a regular fixture in the local society column.

When she started as an architect, she used her home as an office and studio for her one-woman practice. Asked about her architecture projects, she said she had worked on "apartments, residences and hot dog stands." She became acquainted with fellow architect Addison Mizner, who designed lavish homes in the area. When he organized a local architects' club, Ballard was the secretary.

=== Superintendent of schools ===
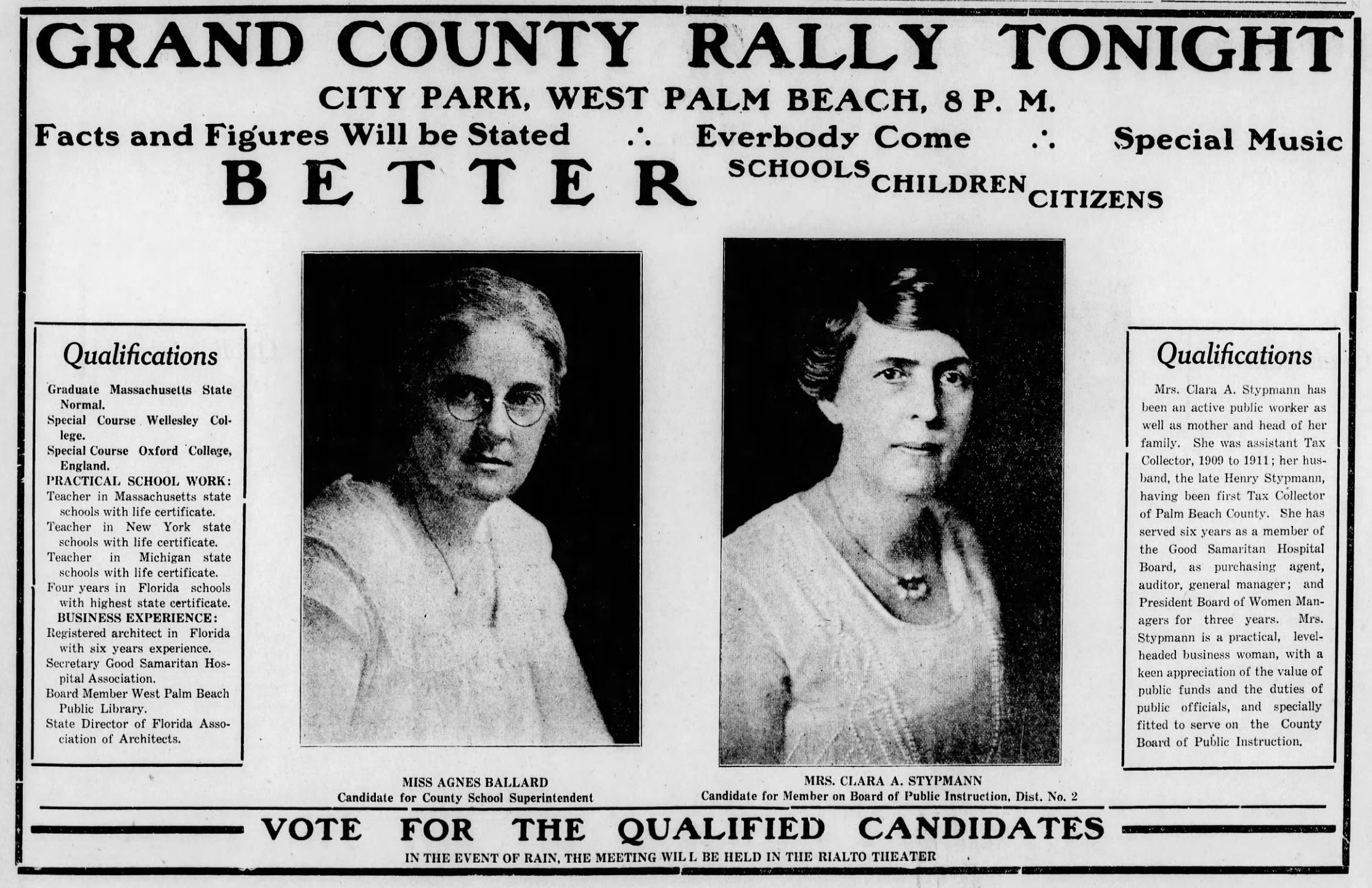
October 29, 1920, campaign rally advertisement

After the 19th Amendment was adopted on August 18, 1920, friends asked Ballard to run for office in the election that fall. She ran for County Superintendent of Schools, alongside Clara Stypmann who ran for the school board. Ballard had worked as a teacher for the school district before, but her six years of architecture experience was also relevant because the district was booming and needed to build new schools. Both candidates won their elections, making them among the first women ever elected to public office in Florida. Ballard took office on January 4, 1921.

During her term, Ballard led the district through "boom years of incredible growth." She was appointed chairperson of the civic improvement committee of the Florida Association of Architects. Among the building projects that were begun under her was a vocational school at Canal Point, built for the then large sum of $8,000. She was elected President of the Royal Palm Educational Association, an alliance of the school districts of three Florida counties.

But she was a "stern" leader and her term of office was a "rocky one." She sought bond money to build new schools, but local voters were unenthusiastic. As a result she proposed the district buy an early version of a portable classroom. She once fired a male principal who had his students demonstrate at her home until police were called.

In 1924, she had "had enough" and declined to run for re-election. Joseph A. Youngblood took over her post.

=== Later career ===
After her term ended, Ballard got into real estate investing and did well until a crash occurred in 1926. That sent her back to teaching and architecture.

She contacted Youngblood (her successor) for a teaching job, and she was given one at Conniston Road School. By 1934, she was teaching Latin, algebra, history, English and civics at Palm Beach Elementary. She continued her education during the summer in Gainesville, Florida, and, in August 1936, the University of Florida awarded her a B.A. in Education. She made Phi Kappa Phi.

In 1947, she retired from teaching after 19 years of service, taking up architecture again. At this time, she had two draftsmen working for her. In 1957, she retired from her architecture business and again ran for school board, this time at age 80, but failed in this attempt.

After a local article chronicled her forgotten history, the Florida chapter of the American Institute of Architects voted to give her a posthumous award in July 2016.

=== Personal life ===
Ballard never married. She had one brother (Willis D.) and one sister (Ethel G.), both of whom she survived. Aside from English and Latin, she spoke five languages including French, Spanish, Italian, German and Russian. She sang and played the organ; she played chess. She was involved in many clubs and other activities, to the extent that her friends called her "Activity" Ballard. She occasionally travelled, visiting England and Scotland in 1908. She also took a trip to Europe in 1926, visiting Paris and the French Riviera. Later in life she visited Alaska on the recommendation of Wilson Mizner (the brother of architect Addison Mizner).

She died on November 24, 1969, in West Palm Beach.

== Known architectural works ==
Many of Ballard's architectural works have not survived to the present day, or are not recorded as being hers. Some that are known to still exist:

- 411 26th Street (1951), a non-contributing property in the Old Northwood Historic District in West Palm Beach
- Palm Beach house (1953), renovated by sculptor John Raimondi in 1988
- Lund House (1955) at 3410 Poinsettia Ave, West Palm Beach

== See also ==
- Ida Annah Ryan, the second woman AIA from Florida, also born in Massachusetts
- Marion Manley, the third woman AIA from Florida and the first woman FAIA from the state
- Women in architecture
