= Cristina Padolina =

7th President of the Centro Escolar University
- In office June 2006 – March 26, 2026
- Preceded by: Dr. Rosita L. Navarro
- Succeeded by: Danilo Concepcion

1st Chancellor of the University of the Philippines Open University
- In office 1995–2001
- Preceded by: Position established
- Succeeded by: Felix Librero

Personal details
- Born: 1946 (age 79–80)
- Spouse: William Padolina
- Children: 3
- Education: University of the Philippines Diliman

Maria Cristina Damasco-Padolina (born 1946) is Filipino chemist, educator, and academic leader. She recently served as the seventh president and chief academic officer of Centro Escolar University in Manila, Philippines. She is a professor emeritus of the Institute of Chemistry at the University of the Philippines Los Baños. She also served as the first chancellor of the University of the Philippines Open University.

== Career ==
In 1999, Cristina Padolina received the Most Distinguished Alumna Award given by the UP Alumni Engineers. Padolina is a member of the Advisory Group of the National Health Promotion Committee, and was on the executive board of the Asian Association of Open Universities from 1998 to 2001. She was appointed as the university's president and chief academic officer in September 2006. She led the university's centennial in 2007.

Academic offices
Preceded by Rosita L. Navarro	President of the Centro Escolar University; 2006–2025	Succeeded by Danilo Concepcion
New title Position established	Chancellor of the University of the Philippines Open University; 1995–2001	Succeeded by Felix Librero
