= Rhode Island Superior Court =

The Rhode Island Superior Court is the state trial court of general jurisdiction in Rhode Island.

== Jurisdiction ==
The Superior Court has original jurisdiction in all felony proceedings, civil matters with an amount in controversy in excess of $10,000, and all matters of equity. The Superior Court exercises concurrent jurisdiction in civil matters with an amount in controversy between $5,000 and $10,000 with the lower District Court (a court of limited jurisdiction), and also has concurrent jurisdiction with the Rhode Island Supreme Court (the state supreme court) in the issuance of writs of habeas corpus and mandamus.

The Superior Court is the trial court of record in Rhode Island and is the only Rhode Island court for hearing jury trials. The lower District Courts hear trials of misdemeanor cases, and the decisions of the District Court may be appealed to the Superior Court for a trial de novo (new trial).

The Superior Court has a specialized business court track, the Business Calendar, which is one of the oldest business court programs in the United States, originally led by Associate Justice Michael A. Silverstein, who served as a Business Calendar judge from 2001 to 2018.

Since Rhode Island has no intermediate appellate court, appeals from the Superior Court go directly to the Supreme Court.

== Organization ==
The chief administrative judge of the court is the Presiding Justice of the Superior Court. The chief administrative judge establishes calendars, assigns judges, appoints the Superior Court administrator, jury commissioner, and other staff, and makes rules for court business. The Presiding Justice manages the Central Registry, Arbitration Office, and Clerk's Office. There are 21 Associate Justices and five Magistrates of the Superior Court.

Rhode Island's five counties each have separate jurisdictions of Superior Court: One in Kent County (at the Noel Judicial Complex in Warwick), one in Washington County (at the McGrath Judicial Complex at Wakefield), one in Newport County (at the Murray Judicial Complex in Newport), and a combined jurisdiction for Providence and Bristol counties (at the Licht Judicial Complex, formerly known as the Providence County Courthouse, in the state capital of Providence (which the Superior Court shares with the Supreme Court and Rhode Island Law Library).

== See also ==
- Vincent Ragosta, former Rhode Island Superior Court justice
- Rhode Island Supreme Court
