= Amada Santos Ocampo =

Amada "Amy" Galvez Santos-Ocampo De Francesco (23 June 1925 – 20 December 2009) was a Philippine pianist and composer.

== Biography ==
Amada Santos-Ocampo was born in Manila, Philippines, of parents Antonino Santos-Ocampo, Sr., and Juanita Galvez of Manila. She graduated with a bachelor's degree from Centro Escolar University in Manila, and a master's degree in music composition from DePauw University in Indiana in 1960. She studied for her PhD in music composition at Indiana University School of Music.

Santos-Ocampo took a position in the Penn State University human kinetics programs where she worked for 24 years and composed music for ballet. She was one of the first members of the League of Filipino Composers founded in 1955. Santos-Ocampo died in San Jose, California.
