= Gaby Concepcion =

Filipino lawyer and television host

Gabriela Concepcion
- Born: Ma. Gabriela Roldan
- Education: University of the Philippines, (BA, LL.B.)
- Occupations: Lawyer, actress, professor

Gabriela Concepcion (née Roldan) is a Filipino television host, actress, lawyer, and professor. She is married to former University of the Philippines president, lawyer Danilo Concepcion. A hisbiscus hybrid species was named after her by the University of the Philippines Los Baños.

== Education and career ==
Concepcion graduated from the University of the Philippines College of Arts and Sciences in 1985 finishing her Bachelor of Arts in Political Science, magna cum laude. She continued studying at the University of the Philippines to attain her law degree in 1990, and was admitted to the bar a year after. She is a member of the international honor societies of Phi Kappa Phi and Pi Gamma Mu. She teaches at the Pamantasan ng Lungsod ng Maynila College of Law, Ateneo de Manila John Gokongwei School of Management, and at the University of the Philippines Diliman. She is a member of the Movie and Television Review and Classification Board (MTRCB), the Philippine government agency responsible for the classification and review of television programs, motion pictures, and home videos.

== Filmography ==
=== Film ===
Year	Title	Role
2010	One True Love	Cameo
2010	You to Me Are Everything	Boardroom Executive
2014	Mariquina	Graduation host

=== Television ===
Year	Title	Role
2003–present	Unang Hirit	Host
2025	Shining Inheritance	Herself
