= Old Northwood Historic District =

Historic district in Florida, United States

- U.S. National Register of Historic Places
- U.S. Historic district
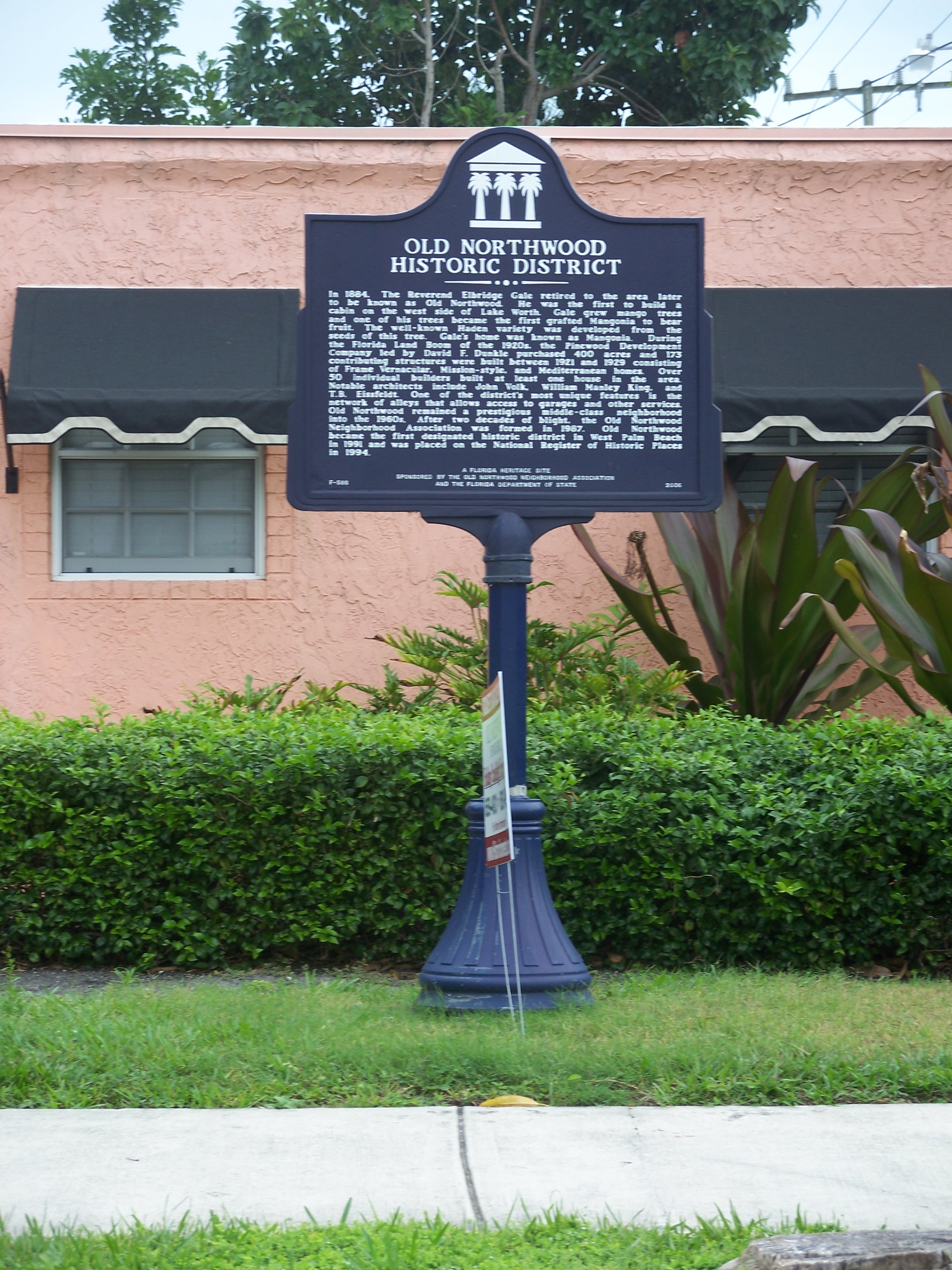
- Historic Marker for the Old Northwood Historic District

- Location within Florida Location within the United States
- Location: West Palm Beach, Florida
- Coordinates: 26°44′28″N 80°3′17″W
- Area: 90 acres (360,000 m^{2})
- NRHP reference No.: 94000368
- Added to NRHP: April 14, 1994

The Old Northwood Historic District is a U.S. historic district (designated as such on April 14, 1994) located in West Palm Beach, Florida. The district is bounded by Broadway, North Dixie Highway and 26th and 35th Streets. It contains 320 historic buildings.
