= Vincent Ragosta =

American judge

Associate Justice of the Rhode Island Superior Court
- In office 1988 – June 2008
- Appointed by: Edward D. DiPrete

Associate Judge of the Rhode Island District Court
- In office 1978–1988
- Appointed by: J. Joseph Garrahy

Personal details
- Born: Vincent Anthony Ragosta; February 12, 1924 Providence, Rhode Island, U.S.
- Died: August 9, 2017 (aged 93) Providence, Rhode Island, U.S.
- Spouse: Carmela C. Bruno (m. 1953)
- Children: 4
- Education: University of Rhode Island (BS); Boston College (LLB)
- Awards: Knight of the Order of the Star of Italian Solidarity

Military service
- Branch/service: United States Army
- Rank: Staff Sergeant
- Unit: Intelligence Corps
- Battles/wars: World War II

Vincent Anthony Ragosta (February 12, 1924 – August 9, 2017) was an American lawyer and jurist from Rhode Island. He was a former Rhode Island Superior Court justice.

== Biography ==
=== Early life, education & military service ===
Ragosta was born in Providence, Rhode Island in 1924. He attended the University of Rhode Island before being drafted into the United States Army during World War II and was stationed in Okinawa, in preparation to invade Japan, until the United States dropped the atomic bombs on Nagasaki and Hiroshima in 1945. He was honorably discharged as a staff sergeant and continued to graduate from the University of Rhode Island in 1949. In 1951, he graduated from Boston College Law School, earning his Juris Doctor. He was a recipient of the Polygon Prize and was elected into the national honorary societies of Phi Kappa Phi and Beta Gamma Sigma. He also attended Johns Hopkins University and The Citadel.

=== Career ===
Ragosta worked as an assistant city solicitor in the city of Providence from 1953 until 1966. He had a very successful law practice in Providence for 27 years. He also served on the state Family Violence Unit Advisory Panel (which was part of the office of the Rhode Island Attorney General) and on the state Advisory Council on Social Welfare.

In 1978, he was appointed to the state District Court by then-governor J. Joseph Garrahy. In 1988, he was appointed to the state Superior Court by then-Governor Edward D. DiPrete and later retired from the bench in June 2008. At the time of his retirement, he was the oldest judge in the state of Rhode Island.

=== Marriage and children ===
Ragosta was married and had four sons. He died on August 9, 2017, at the age of 93.

=== Honorary Awards ===
In 1975 he was awarded the Star of Italian Solidarity with the rank of Knight by the President of Italy Giovanni Leone.
