= 3rd Philippine Legislature =

5th legislative term of the Philippines

←	2nd	4th	→
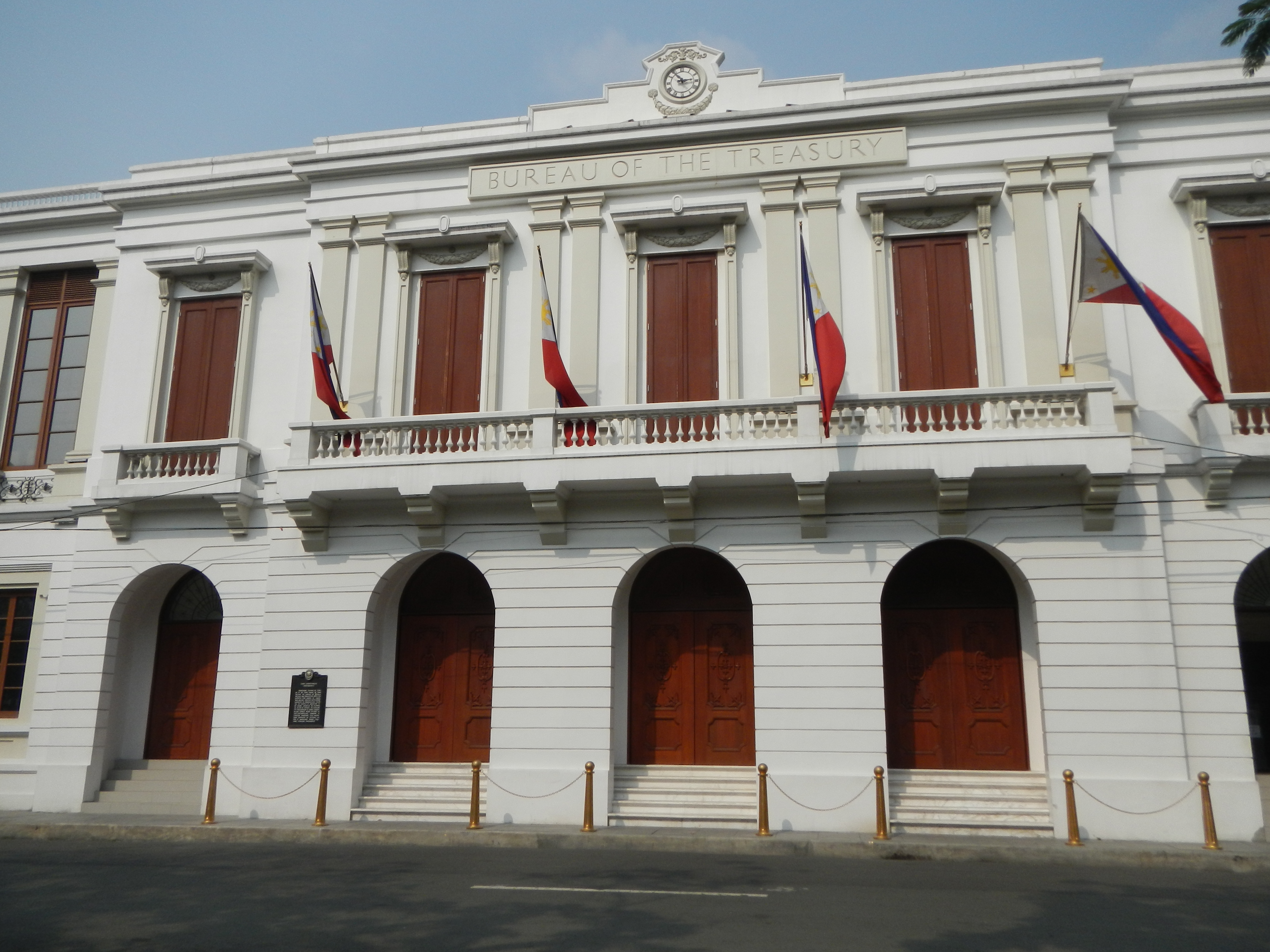
- Ayuntamiento de Manila (2014)

Overview
- Term: October 16, 1912 – February 24, 1916
- Governor-General: William Cameron Forbes (until September 1, 1913); Francis Burton Harrison (from September 2, 1913)

Philippine Commission
- Members: 9
- President: William Cameron Forbes (until September 1, 1913); Francis Burton Harrison (from September 2, 1913)

Philippine Assembly
- Members: 81
- Speaker: Sergio Osmeña
- Majority leader: Macario Adriatico (until November 5, 1914); Galicano Apacible (from November 5, 1914)

The 3rd Philippine Legislature was the meeting of the legislature of the Philippines under the sovereign control of the United States from October 16, 1912, to February 24, 1916.

== Sessions ==
- First Regular Session: October 16, 1912 – February 3, 1913
- First Special Session: February 6 – 11, 1913
- Second Regular Session: October 16, 1913 – February 3, 1914
- Second Special Session: February 4 – 28, 1914
- Third Regular Session: October 16, 1914 – February 5, 1915
- Fourth Regular Session: October 16, 1915 – February 4, 1916
- Third Special Session: February 14 – 24, 1916

== Legislation ==
The Third Philippine Legislature passed a total of 473 laws (Act Nos. 2192–2664).

== Party summary ==
Assembly membership

Beginning of the Legislature

End of the Legislature

=== Philippine Assembly ===
	Party (shading shows control)					Total	Vacant
	Nacionalista	Progresista	Democrata	Liga Popular	Independent	Total	Vacant
End of previous legislature	55	20	—N/a	1	5	81	
Begin	58	17	—N/a	1	5	81	0
End	54	19	—N/a	2	5	80	1
Final voting share	66.7%	23.5%	—N/a	2.5%	6.2%		
Beginning of next legislature	68	13	3	1	5	90	0

== Leadership ==
=== Philippine Commission ===
President of the Commission

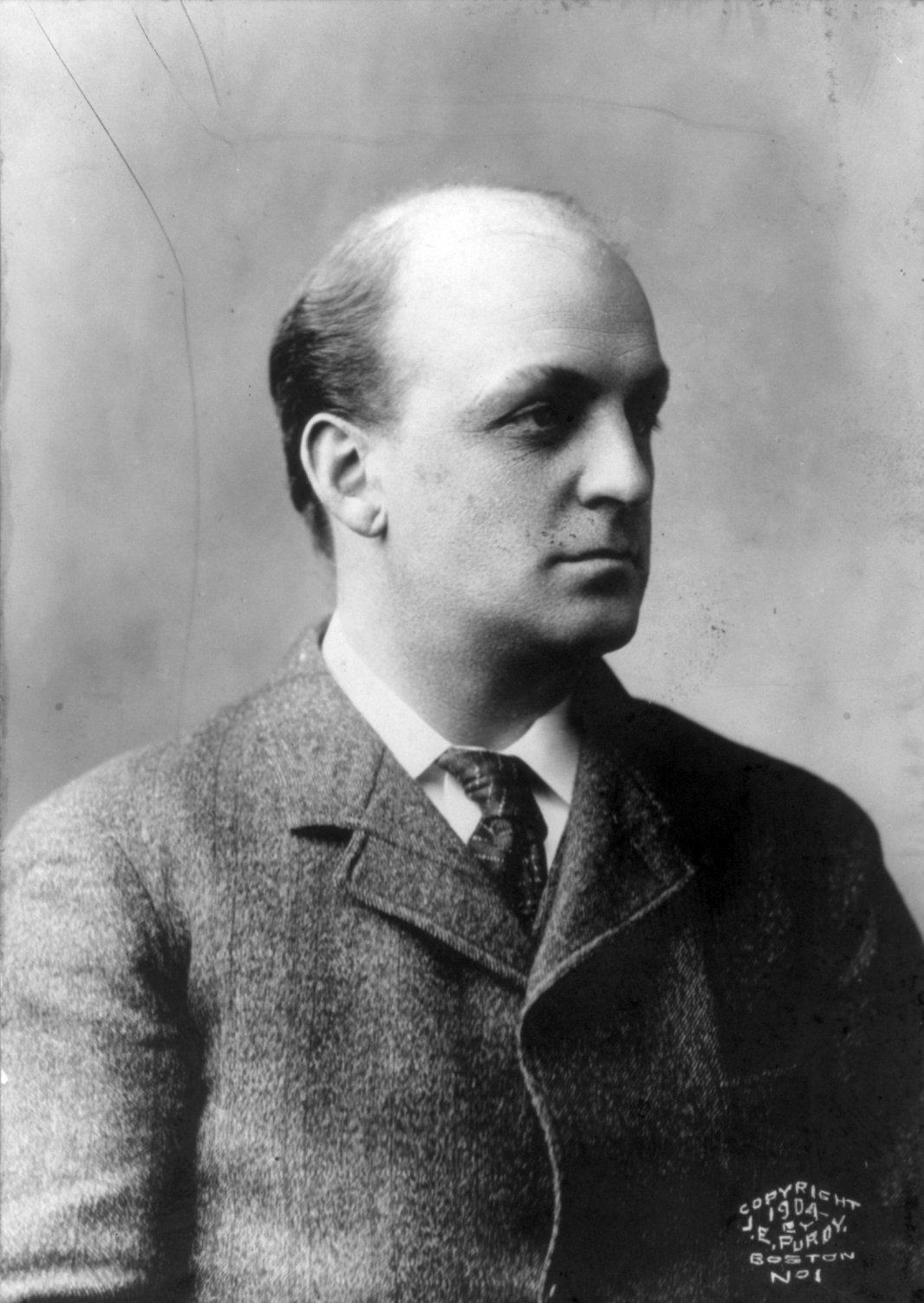
William Cameron Forbes,
until September 1, 1913

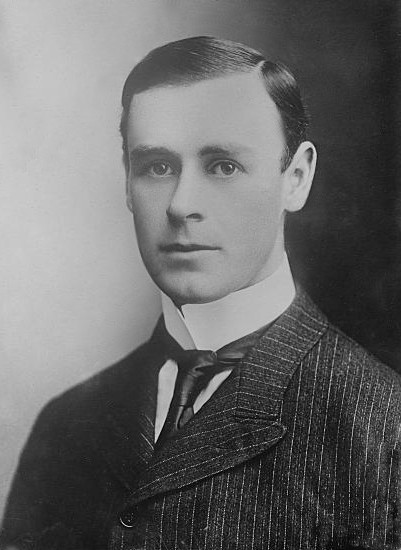
Francis Burton Harrison,
from September 2, 1913

- Governor-General and President of the Philippine Commission:
  - William Cameron Forbes, until September 1, 1913
  - Francis Burton Harrison, from September 2, 1913

=== Philippine Assembly ===
Speaker of the Assembly

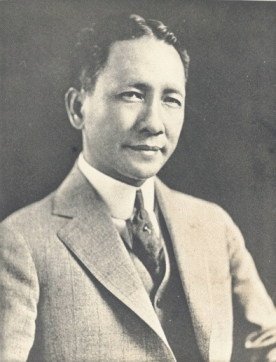
Sergio Osmeña

- Speaker: Sergio Osmeña (Cebu–2nd, Nacionalista)
- Majority Floor Leader:
  - Macario Adriatico (Mindoro, Nacionalista), until November 5, 1914
  - Galicano Apacible (Batangas–1st, Nacionalista), from November 5, 1914

== Members ==
=== Philippine Commission ===
- Gregorio S. Araneta (Note: Gregorio S. Araneta resigned as commissioner and concurrent Secretary of Finance and Justice on October 30, 1913.)
- Frank A. Branagan (Note: Frank A. Branagan resigned as commissioner on October 30, 1913.)
- Jaime C. de Veyra (Note: Jaime C. de Veyra took office as commissioner on October 30, 1913, to succeed Frank A. Branagan.)
- Winfred Thaxter Denison (Note: Winfred Thaxter Denison took office as commissioner and concurrent Secretary of the Interior on January 28, 1914, to succeed Dean Conant Worcester.)
- Charles B. Elliott (Note: Charles B. Elliott resigned as commissioner and concurrent Secretary of Commerce and Police on December 4, 1912.)
- Vicente Singson Encarnacion (Note: Vicente Singson Encarnacion took office as commissioner on October 30, 1913, to succeed Jose de Luzuriaga.)
- William Cameron Forbes (Note: William Cameron Forbes resigned as Governor-General of the Philippines on September 1, 1913.)
- Newton W. Gilbert (Note: Newton W. Gilbert resigned as commissioner and concurrent Secretary of Public Instruction on December 1, 1913.)
- Francis Burton Harrison (Note: Francis Burton Harrison took office as Governor-General of the Philippines on September 2, 1913, to succeed William Cameron Forbes.)
- Vicente Ilustre (Note: Vicente Ilustre took office as commissioner on October 30, 1913, to succeed Juan Sumulong.)
- Victorino Mapa (Note: Victorino Mapa took office as commissioner and concurrent Secretary of Finance and Justice on October 30, 1913, to succeed Gregorio S. Araneta.)
- Jose de Luzuriaga (Note: Jose de Luzuriaga resigned as commissioner on October 30, 1913.)
- Henderson S. Martin (Note: Henderson S. Martin took office as commissioner and concurrent Secretary of Public Instruction on December 1, 1913, succeeding Newton W. Gilbert.)
- Rafael Palma
- Eugene E. Reed (Note: Eugene E. Reed took office as commissioner and concurrent Secretary of Commerce and Police on May 24, 1916, to succeed Clinton L. Riggs.)
- Clinton L. Riggs (Note: Clinton L. Riggs took office as commissioner and concurrent Secretary of Commerce and Police on December 1, 1913, to succeed Charles B. Elliott. He later resigned from both positions on October 31, 1915.)
- Juan Sumulong (Note: Juan Sumulong resigned as commissioner on October 30, 1913.)
- Dean Conant Worcester (Note: Dean Conant Worcester resigned as commissioner and concurrent Secretary of the Interior on September 15, 1913.)

Sources:

- Journal of the Philippine Commission Being the First Session, October 16, 1912, to February 3, 1913, and A Special Session, February 6, 1913, to February 11, 1913, of the Third Philippine Legislature. Manila: Bureau of Printing. 1913.
- Journal of the Philippine Commission Being the Second Session, October 16, 1913, to February 3, 1914, and A Special Session, February 6, 1914, to February 28, 1914, of the Third Philippine Legislature. Manila: Bureau of Printing. 1914.
- Journal of the Philippine Commission Being the Third Session, October 16, 1914, to February 5, 1915, of the Third Philippine Legislature. Manila: Bureau of Printing. 1915.
- Journal of the Philippine Commission Being the Fourth Session, October 16, 1915, to February 4, 1916, and A Special Session, February 14, 1916, to February 24, 1916, of the Third Philippine Legislature. Manila: Bureau of Printing. 1916.

=== Philippine Assembly ===
Province/City	District	Member	Party
Albay	1st	Domingo Diaz	Nacionalista
Albay	2nd	Mariano A. Locsin	Progresista
Albay	3rd	Ceferino Villareal	Nacionalista
Ambos Camarines	1st	Silverio D. Cecilio	Nacionalista
Ambos Camarines	2nd	Julian Ocampo	Nacionalista
Ambos Camarines	3rd	Jose Fuentebella	Nacionalista
Antique	Lone	Angel Salazar	Progresista
Bataan	Lone	Pablo Tecson	Nacionalista
Batanes	Lone	Vicente Barsana	Progresista
Batangas	1st	Galicano Apacible	Nacionalista
Batangas	2nd	Marcelo Caringal	Nacionalista
Batangas	3rd	Fidel Reyes	Nacionalista
Bohol	1st	Candelario Borja	Nacionalista
Bohol	2nd	Jose Clarin	Nacionalista
Bohol	3rd	Juan Virtudes	Nacionalista
Bulacan	1st	Aguedo Velarde (Note: Aguedo Velarde died on December 22, 1913.)	Nacionalista
Bulacan	1st	Ambrosio Santos (Note: Ambrosio Santos was elected on May 15, 1914, to succeed Aguedo Velarde.)	Nacionalista
Bulacan	2nd	Ceferino de Leon	Nacionalista
Cagayan	1st	Cresencio Marasigan (Note: Cresencio Marasigan was removed on February 14, 1914.)	Nacionalista
Cagayan	1st	Venancio Concepcion (Note: Venancio Concepcion was elected on May 16, 1914, to succeed Cresencio Marasigan.)	Nacionalista
Cagayan	2nd	Juan Quintos	Progresista
Capiz	1st	Rafael Acuña	Nacionalista
Capiz	2nd	Simeon Dadivas (Note: Simeon Dadivas died on July 27, 1914.)	Nacionalista
Capiz	2nd	Emilio Acevedo (Note: Emilio Acevedo was elected on October 10, 1914, to succeed Simeon Dadivas.)	Progresista
Capiz	3rd	Jose Tirol	Progresista
Cavite	Lone	Florentino Joya	Independent
Cebu	1st	Gervacio Padilla	Nacionalista
Cebu	2nd	Sergio Osmeña	Nacionalista
Cebu	3rd	Filemon Sotto	Nacionalista
Cebu	4th	Alejandro Ruiz	Nacionalista
Cebu	5th	Mariano Jesus Cuenco	Nacionalista
Cebu	6th	Vicente Lozada	Nacionalista
Cebu	7th	Eulalio E. Causing (Note: Eulalio E. Causing resigned on October 13, 1914.)	Nacionalista
Cebu	7th	Tomas N. Alonso (Note: Tomas N. Alonso was elected on November 21, 1914, to succeed Eulalio E. Causing.)	Nacionalista
Ilocos Norte	1st	Santiago Fonacier	Nacionalista
Ilocos Norte	2nd	Teogenes Quiaoit	Progresista
Ilocos Sur	1st	Vicente Singson Encarnacion (Note: Vicente Singson Encarnacion was appointed to the Philippine Commission on October 30, 1913.)	Progresista
Ilocos Sur	1st	Alberto Reyes (Note: Alberto Reyes was elected in on February 24, 1914, to succeed Vicente Singson Encarnacion.)	Progresista
Ilocos Sur	2nd	Gregorio Talavera	Progresista
Ilocos Sur	3rd	Julio Borbon	Nacionalista
Iloilo	1st	Francisco Felipe Villanueva	Progresista
Iloilo	2nd	Perfecto J. Salas	Nacionalista
Iloilo	3rd	Ernesto Gustilo	Independent
Iloilo	4th	Tiburcio Lutero	Progresista
Iloilo	5th	Cirilo Mapa	Progresista
Isabela	Lone	Eliseo Claravall	Progresista
La Laguna	1st	Servillano Platon	Nacionalista
La Laguna	2nd	Pedro Guevara	Nacionalista
La Union	1st	Joaquin Luna	Nacionalista
La Union	2nd	Florencio Baltazar	Progresista
Leyte	1st	Estanislao Granados	Nacionalista
Leyte	2nd	Dalmacio Costas	Nacionalista
Leyte	3rd	Miguel Romualdez	Independent
Leyte	4th	Francisco Enage (Note: Francisco Enage was appointed as provincial fiscal of Iloilo on February 5, 1915.)	Nacionalista
Leyte	4th	Ruperto Kapunan (Note: Ruperto Kapunan was elected on September 18, 1915, to succeed Francisco Enage.)	Progresista
Manila	1st	Isidoro de Santos	Nacionalista
Manila	2nd	Luciano de la Rosa	Liga Popular
Mindoro	Lone	Macario Adriatico (Note: Macario Adriatico was appointed to the Code Committee on March 1, 1914.)	Nacionalista
Mindoro	Lone	Mariano P. Leuterio (Note: Mariano P. Leuterio was elected on June 8, 1914, to succeed Macario Adriatico.)	Liga Popular
Misamis	1st	Leon Borromeo	Nacionalista
Misamis	2nd	Nicolas Capistrano	Nacionalista
Negros Occidental	1st	Melecio Severino (Note: Melecio Severino died on May 25, 1915.)	Nacionalista
Negros Occidental	2nd	Rafael R. Alunan	Nacionalista
Negros Occidental	3rd	Gil Montilla	Nacionalista
Negros Oriental	1st	Hermenegildo Villanueva	Progresista
Negros Oriental	2nd	Teofisto Guingona Sr. (Note: Teofisto Guingona Sr. was appointed as Governor of Agusan on June 10, 1914.)	Progresista
Negros Oriental	2nd	Leopoldo Rovira (Note: Leopoldo Rovira was elected on October 1, 1914, to succeed Teofisto Guingona Sr..)	Progresista
Nueva Ecija	Lone	Lucio Gonzales	Nacionalista
Palawan	Lone	Manuel Sandoval	Nacionalista
Pampanga	1st	Eduardo Gutierrez David	Progresista
Pampanga	2nd	Andres Luciano	Nacionalista
Pangasinan	1st	Vicente Solis	Independent
Pangasinan	2nd	Rodrigo D. Perez	Nacionalista
Pangasinan	3rd	Rufo G. Cruz	Nacionalista
Pangasinan	4th	Pedro Maria Sison	Nacionalista
Pangasinan	5th	Hugo Sansano Sr.	Nacionalista
Rizal	1st	Arsenio Cruz Herrera	Progresista
Rizal	2nd	Sixto de los Angeles (Note: Sixto de los Angeles was appointed to the Public Welfare Board on April 3, 1915.)	Nacionalista
Rizal	2nd	Leandro A. Jabson (Note: Leandro A. Jabson was elected on September 18, 1915, to succeed Sixto de los Angeles.)	Nacionalista
Samar	1st	Tomas Gomez	Nacionalista
Samar	2nd	Jose Sabarre	Nacionalista
Samar	3rd	Mariano Alde	Nacionalista
Sorsogon	1st	Leoncio Grajo	Nacionalista
Sorsogon	2nd	Jose Zurbito	Nacionalista
Surigao	Lone	Inocencio Cortes	Nacionalista
Tarlac	1st	Luis Morales	Nacionalista
Tarlac	2nd	Jose Espinosa	Nacionalista
Tayabas	1st	Filemon Perez	Nacionalista
Tayabas	2nd	Bernardo del Mundo	Independent
Zambales	Lone	Rafael Corpus (Note: Rafael Corpus was appointed as Solicitor General on March 1, 1914.)	Nacionalista
Zambales	Lone	Gabriel Alba (Note: Gabriel Alba was elected on July 22, 1914, to succeed Rafael Corpus.)	Nacionalista

Source: Philippine Assembly (1908). Official Directory of the First Philippine Legislature. Manila: Bureau of Printing.

== Changes in membership ==
=== Philippine Assembly ===
District	Incumbent				Special election	Successor		
District	Member	Party	Date	Reason	Special election	Member	Party	Date
Ilocos Sur–1st	Vicente Singson Encarnacion	Progresista	October 30, 1913	Appointed to the Philippine Commission on	February 24, 1914	Alberto Reyes	Progresista	February 24, 1914
Bulacan–1st	Aguedo Velarde	Nacionalista	December 22, 1913	Died in office	May 15, 1914	Ambrosio Santos	Nacionalista	May 15, 1914
Cagayan–1st	Cresencio Marasigan	Nacionalista	February 14, 1914	Removed	May 16, 1914	Venancio Concepcion	Nacionalista	May 16, 1914
Mindoro–Lone	Macario Adriatico	Nacionalista	March 1, 1914	Appointed to the Code Committee	June 8, 1914	Mariano P. Leuterio	Liga Popular	June 8, 1914
Zambales–Lone	Rafael Corpus	Nacionalista	March 1, 1914	Appointed Solicitor General	July 22, 1914	Gabriel Alba	Nacionalista	July 22, 1914
Negros Oriental–2nd	Teofisto Guingona Sr.	Progresista	June 10, 1914	Appointed Governor of Agusan	October 1, 1914	Leopoldo Rovira	Progresista	October 1, 1914
Capiz–2nd	Simeon Dadivas	Nacionalista	July 27, 1914	Died in office	October 10, 1914	Emilio Acevedo	Progresista	October 10, 1914
Cebu–7th	Eulalio E. Causing	Nacionalista	October 13, 1914	Resigned	November 21, 1914	Tomás N. Alonso	Nacionalista	November 21, 1914
Leyte–4th	Francisco Enage	Nacionalista	February 5, 1915	Appointed as provincial fiscal of Iloilo	September 18, 1915	Ruperto Kapunan	Progresista	September 18, 1915
Rizal–2nd	Sixto de los Angeles	Nacionalista	April 3, 1915	Appointed to the Public Welfare Board	September 18, 1915	Leandro A. Jabson	Nacionalista	September 18, 1915
Negros Occidental–1st	Melecio Severino	Nacionalista	May 25, 1915	Died in office	—N/a			

== See also ==
- Congress of the Philippines
- Senate of the Philippines
- House of Representatives of the Philippines
