= University of Santo Tomas Hospital =

Private hospital in Manila, Philippines

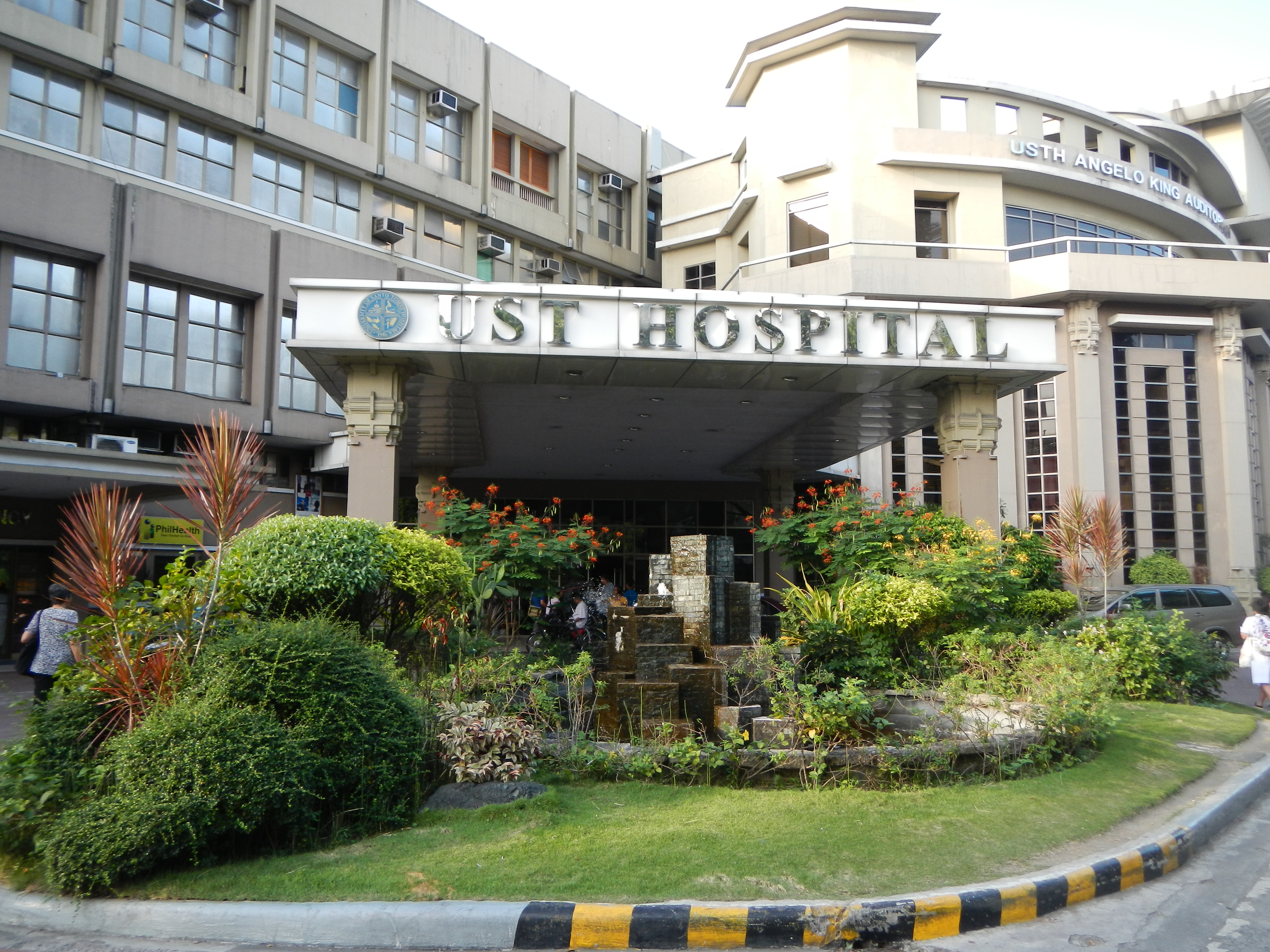
- Entrance of the hospital

Geography
- Location: Arsenio H. Lacson Avenue cor. España Boulevard, Sampaloc, Manila, Philippines
- Coordinates: 14°36′39″N 120°59′24″E

Organization
- Care system: Private, Charity
- Type: Teaching
- Religious affiliation: Order of Preachers
- Affiliated university: University of Santo Tomas
- Patron: Saints Cosmas and Damian

Services
- Beds: 352 private patient beds 460 charity or clinical beds

History
- Founded: March 7, 1946; 79 years ago

Links
- Website: www.usthospital.com.ph
- Lists: Hospitals in the Philippines
- Other links: University of Santo Tomas

The University of Santo Tomas Hospital (abbreviated UST Hospital or USTH) is a hospital located at the University of Santo Tomas. The hospital has two divisions, a clinical teaching hospital that offers inexpensive medical care for indigent patients and a private hospital for patients with financial means, which is partially used to subsidize the clinical division.

== History ==
The University of Santo Tomas Hospital is the third clinical hospital for the University of Santo Tomas. The university received its first teaching hospital on an 1875 order of King Alfonso of Spain, setting up instruction in the Franciscan hospital San Juan de Dios, established in 1577. During the war, San Juan de Dios was converted to hold the Quezon Institute and St. Paul's Hospital given to the university, but the campus and hospital were destroyed in February 1945 during the Liberation of Manila. With supplies purchased from the United States Army and money borrowed from Elizalde and Company, the university built a new facility. The charity unit opened on February 15, 1945, and the private, pay hospital of the University of Santo Tomas opened on March 7, 1946. The hospital subsequently grew, with the units combining with the completion of the University of Santo Tomas Hospital quadrangle in 1959.

The hospital was early in offering genetic counseling to patients in the Philippines, with a prenatal diagnostic clinic opening in 1984. It opened a pediatric intensive care unit three years thereafter.

During the COVID-19 pandemic, the hospital experienced a financial crisis after reporting financial losses from unpaid PhilHealth claims and underpayment of some COVID-19 patients. The management decided to retrench its non-essential staff but has deferred from pushing through with the move.
