= Philippine Commission =

Former Philippine government bodies appointed by the US

The Philippine Commission was the name of two bodies, both appointed by the president of the United States, to assist with governing the Philippines.

The First Philippine Commission, also known as the Schurman Commission, was appointed by President William McKinley on January 20, 1899 as a recommendatory body.

The Second Philippine Commission, also known as the Taft Commission, was appointed on March 16, 1900 to provide civil government to areas under U.S. control. It relied on the presidential war powers of the US military government for its authority. In 1901, the Spooner Amendment to the Army Appropriations Act of 1901 gave the commission, "All military, civil, and Judicial powers necessary to govern the Philippine Islands". The Philippine Organic Act was passed by the United States Congress in 1902 enshrining into more permanent law the commission's legislative and executive authority. As stipulated in that act, the bicameral Philippine Legislature was established in 1907, with the Commission as the upper house and the elected Philippine Assembly acting as lower house. The Jones Act of 1916 ended the Commission, replacing it with an elected Philippine Senate as the legislature's upper house.

== First Philippine Commission ==
On January 20, 1899, President McKinley appointed the First Philippine Commission (the Schurman Commission), a five-person group headed by Dr. Jacob Schurman, president of Cornell University, to investigate conditions in the islands and make recommendations. In the report that they issued to the president the following year, the commissioners acknowledged Filipino aspirations for independence; they declared, however, that the Philippines was not ready for it. Specific recommendations included the establishment of civilian government as rapidly as possible (the American chief executive in the islands at that time was the military governor), including establishment of a bicameral legislature, autonomous governments on the provincial and municipal levels, and a system of free public elementary schools.

== Second Philippine Commission ==
Philippine Commission (or the Second Philippine Commission)

Type
- Type: unicameral (1900–1907) upper house (1907–1916) of the Philippine Legislature

History
- Founded: March 16, 1900
- Disbanded: October 3, 1916
- Preceded by: Schurman Commission
- Succeeded by: Philippine Senate

Leadership
- Governor-General of the Philippines: William Howard Taft

From Philippines: A Country Study by Ronald E. Dolan:

The Second Philippine Commission (the Taft Commission), appointed by McKinley on March 16, 1900, and headed by William Howard Taft, was granted legislative as well as limited executive powers. Between September 1900 and August 1902, it issued 499 laws. A judicial system was established, including a Supreme Court, and a legal code was drawn up to replace antiquated Spanish ordinances. A civil service was organized. The 1901 municipal code provided for popularly elected presidents, vice presidents, and councilors to serve on municipal boards. The municipal board members were responsible for collecting taxes, maintaining municipal properties, and undertaking necessary construction projects; they also elected provincial governors." On July 4, 1901, Taft became governor of a civil administration for the Philippines. This regime, called the Insular Government, administered the country until 1935.

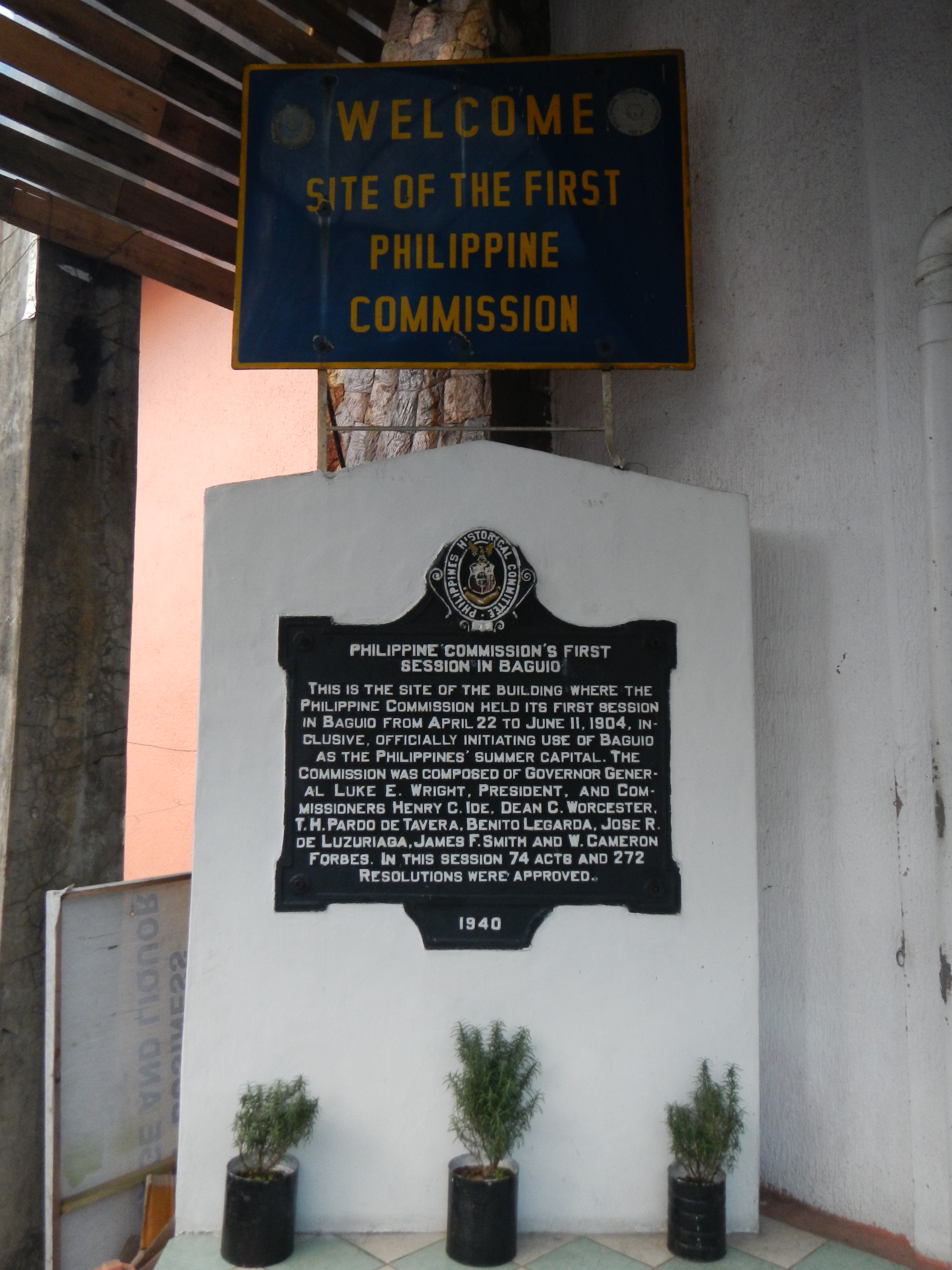
Marker, Session Road

"The Philippine Organic Act of July 1902 stipulated that... a Philippine Legislature would be established composed of a lower house, the Philippine Assembly, which would be popularly elected, and an upper house consisting of the Philippine Commission. The two houses would share legislative powers, although the upper house alone would pass laws relating to the Moros and other non-Christian peoples. The act also provided for extending the United States Bill of Rights to Filipinos and sending two Filipino resident commissioners to Washington to attend sessions of the United States Congress. In July 1907, the first elections for the assembly were held, and it opened its first session on October 16, 1907."

=== Membership ===
==== Leaders ====
The body was led by the governor-general of the Philippines:

- William Howard Taft (1901–1904)
- Luke Edward Wright (1904–1905)
- Henry Clay Ide (1905–1906)
- James Francis Smith (1906–1909)
- William Cameron Forbes (1909–1913)
- Francis Burton Harrison (1913–1916)

==== Other members ====
Secretary of finance and justice:

Name	Month started	Month finished
Secretaries of finance and justice
Henry Clay Ide	September 1, 1901	September 24, 1906
James Francis Smith	September 25, 1906	June 30, 1908
Gregorio S. Araneta	July 1, 1908	October 30, 1913
Victorino Mapa	November 1, 1913	January 14, 1917

Secretary of the Interior:

Name	Month started	Month finished
Secretaries of the Interior
Dean C. Worcester	September 1, 1901	1913
Winfred Thaxter Denison	1913	1916

Secretary of commerce and police:

Name	Month started	Month finished
Secretaries of commerce and police
Luke Edward Wright	September 1, 1901	January 31, 1904
William Cameron Forbes	June 16, 1904	1909
Charles Elliott	1910	1912
Clinton L. Riggs	1913	1915
Eugene Reed	1916	1916

Secretary of public instruction:

Name	Term started	Term finished
Secretaries of public instruction
Bernard Moses	September 1, 1901	1902
James Francis Smith	1902	September 28, 1906
W. Morgan Shuster	September 28, 1906	1909
Newton W. Gilbert	1909	1915
Henderson Martin	1915	1916

Philippine members (1901–1909):

Name	Term started	Term finished
Philippine members of the Philippine Commission
Benito Legarda	September 1, 1901	December 21, 1907
Trinidad H. Pardo de Tavera	September 1, 1901	March 1, 1909
Jose Ruiz de Luzuriaga	September 1, 1901	1913

Philippine members (1909–1913):

Name	Term started	Term finished
Philippine members of the Philippine Commission
Rafael Palma	December 21, 1907	1913
Juan Sumulong	March 1, 1909	1913
Jose Ruiz de Luzuriaga	September 1, 1901	1913
Gregorio S. Araneta	1909	1913

== See also ==
- Congress of the Philippines

== References and notes ==
=== Bibliography ===
- Dolan, Ronald E., ed. (1993). Philippines: A Country Study (4th ed.). Washington, D.C.: GPO for the Library of Congress. ISBN 0-8444-0748-8.
- Halili, Christine N. (2004). Philippine History. Manila: Rex Book Store. ISBN 978-971-23-3934-9.
