= Quezon Institute =

Hospital in Quezon City, Philippines

- Philippine Tuberculosis Society
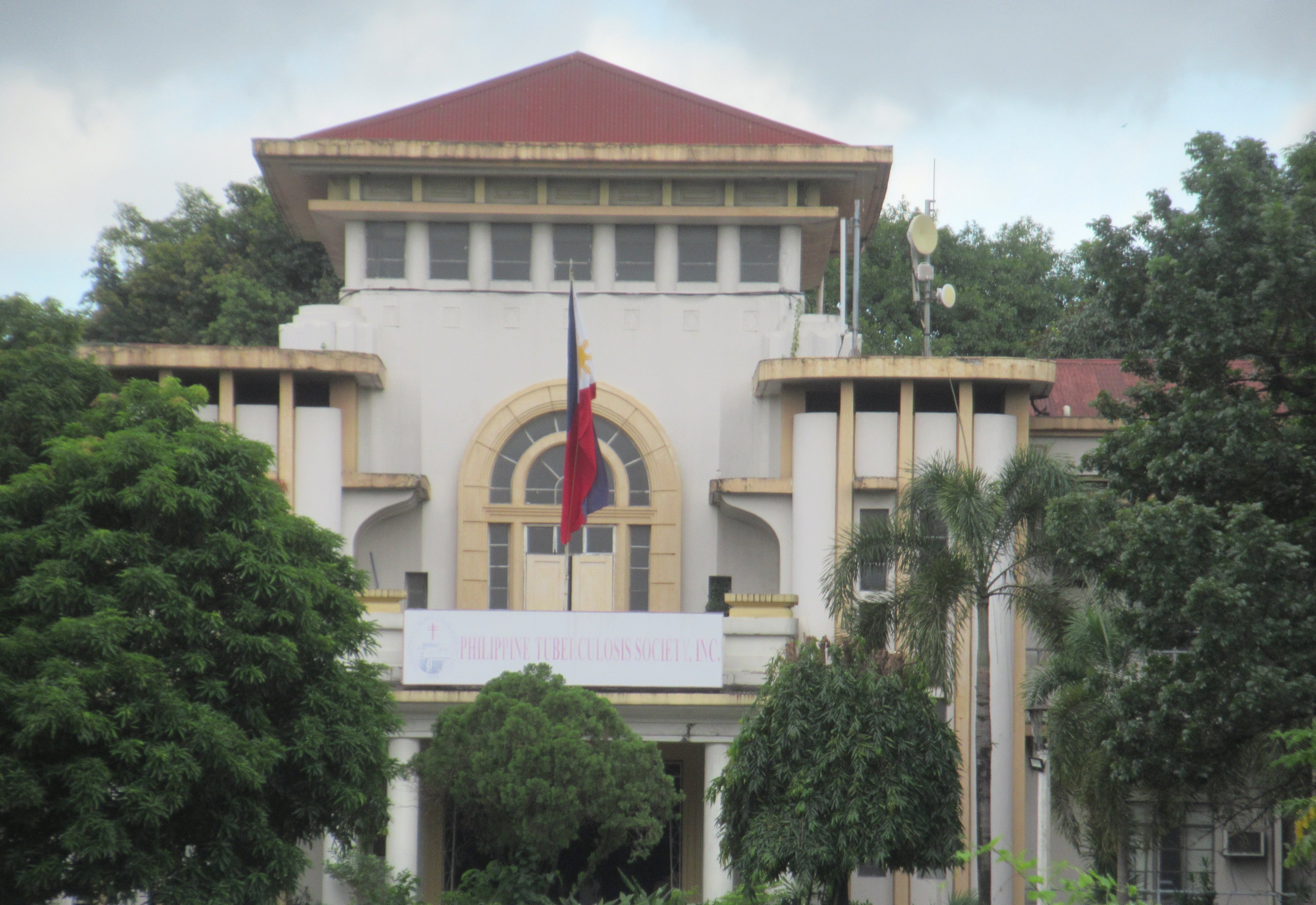

- Location within Metro Manila Location within Luzon Location within Philippines

Geography
- Location: Quezon City, Metro Manila, Philippines
- Coordinates: 14°37′04″N 121°00′46″E

Organization
- Type: Tertiary

History
- Former name: Santol Sanatorium
- Founded: 1918 (as Santol Sanatorium); 1938 (as Quezon Institute)

The Quezon Institute is a hospital in Quezon City, Metro Manila, Philippines. The hospital is operated and managed by Philippine Tuberculosis Society, Inc. (PTSI), which also owns the property where the hospital stands. PTSI is a non-stock, nonprofit organization, with Quezon Institute as its biggest unit. PTSI was incorporated on February 29, 1960, and registered with the Securities and Exchange Commission on March 11, 1960.

== History ==
During the American colonial era, tuberculosis was a major health concern in the Philippines. In 1910, a regional meeting was held in Manila and it was reported the mortality of the disease is estimated to be 40,000. The health situation led to the establishment of the Philippine Islands Anti-Tuberculosis Society on July 29, 1910. It was approved in August of the same year. Eleanor Franklin Egan and Sixto de los Angeles led the organization's efforts against tuberculosis. Egan served as the group's first president.

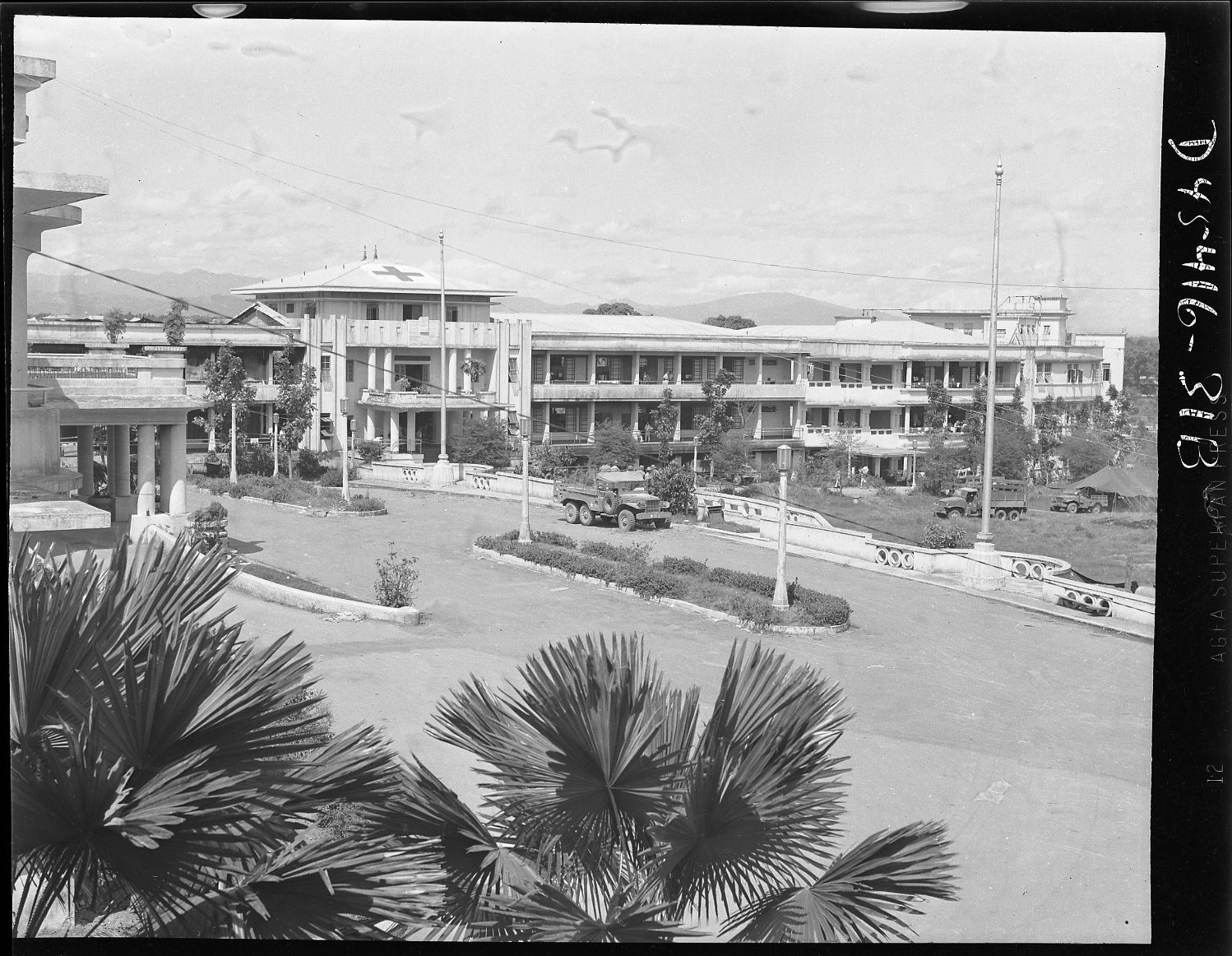
Quezon Institute during WW2

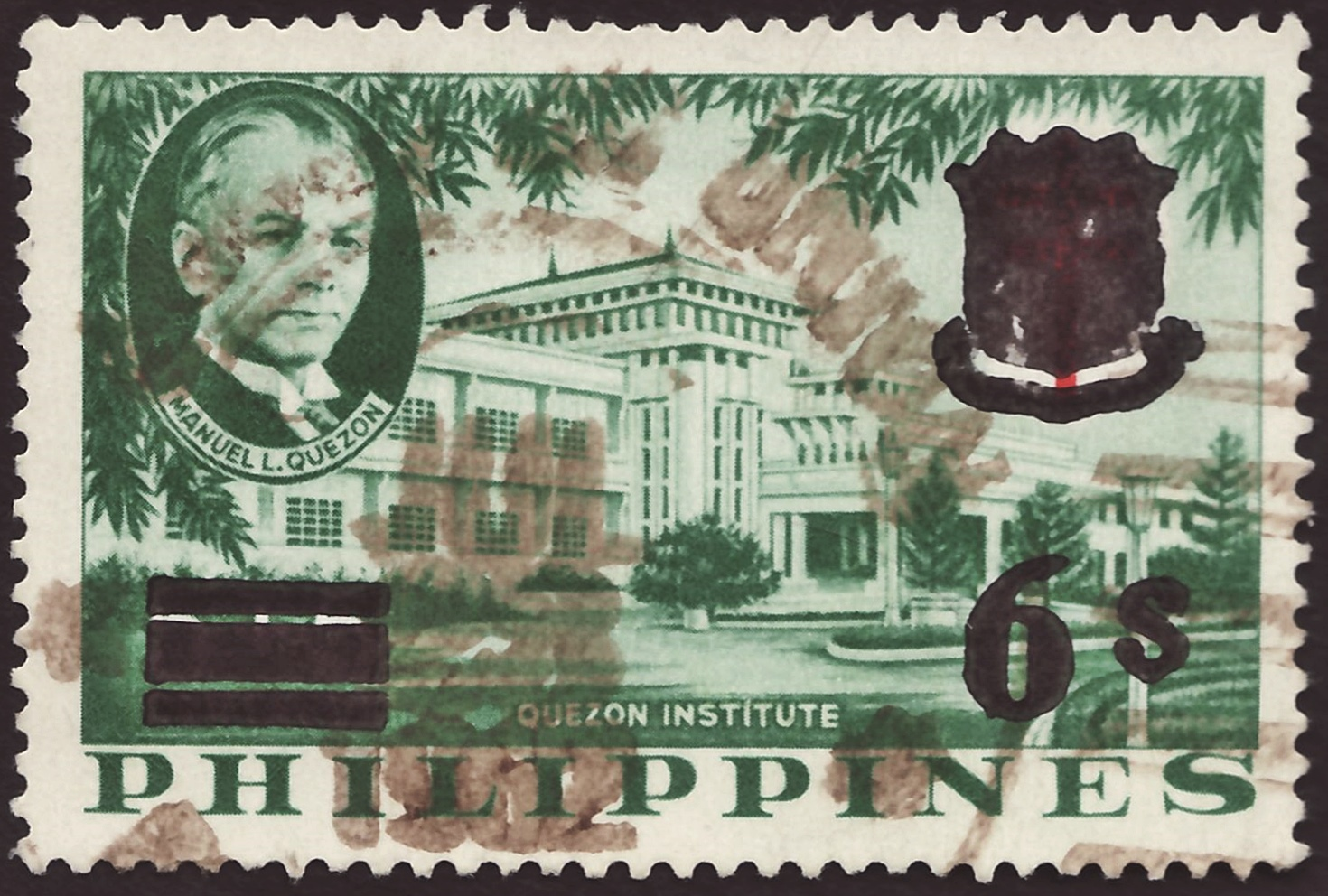
1962 Philippine stamp showing the frontage of the hospital and a portrait of Manuel L. Quezon

The health facility of the Philippine Islands Anti-Tuberculosis Society first opened to the public as the Santol Sanatorium in 1918. In 1934, then-Senate President Manuel L. Quezon lobbied for the passage of the Sweepstakes Law, which allocated 25 percent of its proceeds to the Philippine Tuberculosis Society. This led to the establishment of the hospital arm of the organization in 1938. The health facility formerly known as the Santol Sanatorium was renamed Quezon Institute, in honor of President Manuel L. Quezon who attended the inauguration of the hospital. The complex was designed in the Art Deco architectural style by Juan Nakpil.

Quezon Institute was occupied by the Japanese Imperial Army during the World War II. The hospital's staff were ordered relocated to the San Juan de Dios Hospital in Intramuros, Manila. The hospital's equipment, records, and furniture were looted.

After the end of World War II, President Sergio Osmeña lobbied for the allocation of ₱1 million for anti-tuberculosis efforts in the legislature. ₱800 thousand were allocated to the Philippine Tuberculosis Society (PTSI). With the help of the United States Army which bought supplies and equipment, the Quezon Institute was reopened. The annual Philippine Charity Sweepstakes allocated for the society was increased to ₱1 million peso by then-President Ramon Magsaysay in 1957.

During the Marcos dictatorship, the health conditions and torture that the Marcos regime's political prisoners had to face sometimes led to infections of tuberculosis, as was the case with writer Pete Lacaba, who was confined at the Quezon Institute in between his seasons of incarceration elsewhere.

The Quezon Institute was plot setting for the episode Braso of the 2010 horror film Cinco. In 2014 was plot setting for the episode Taktak of the film My Big Bossing. In 2019, it was the setting for the horror film Maledicto and Clarita.

== E. Rodriguez Sr. Avenue site ==
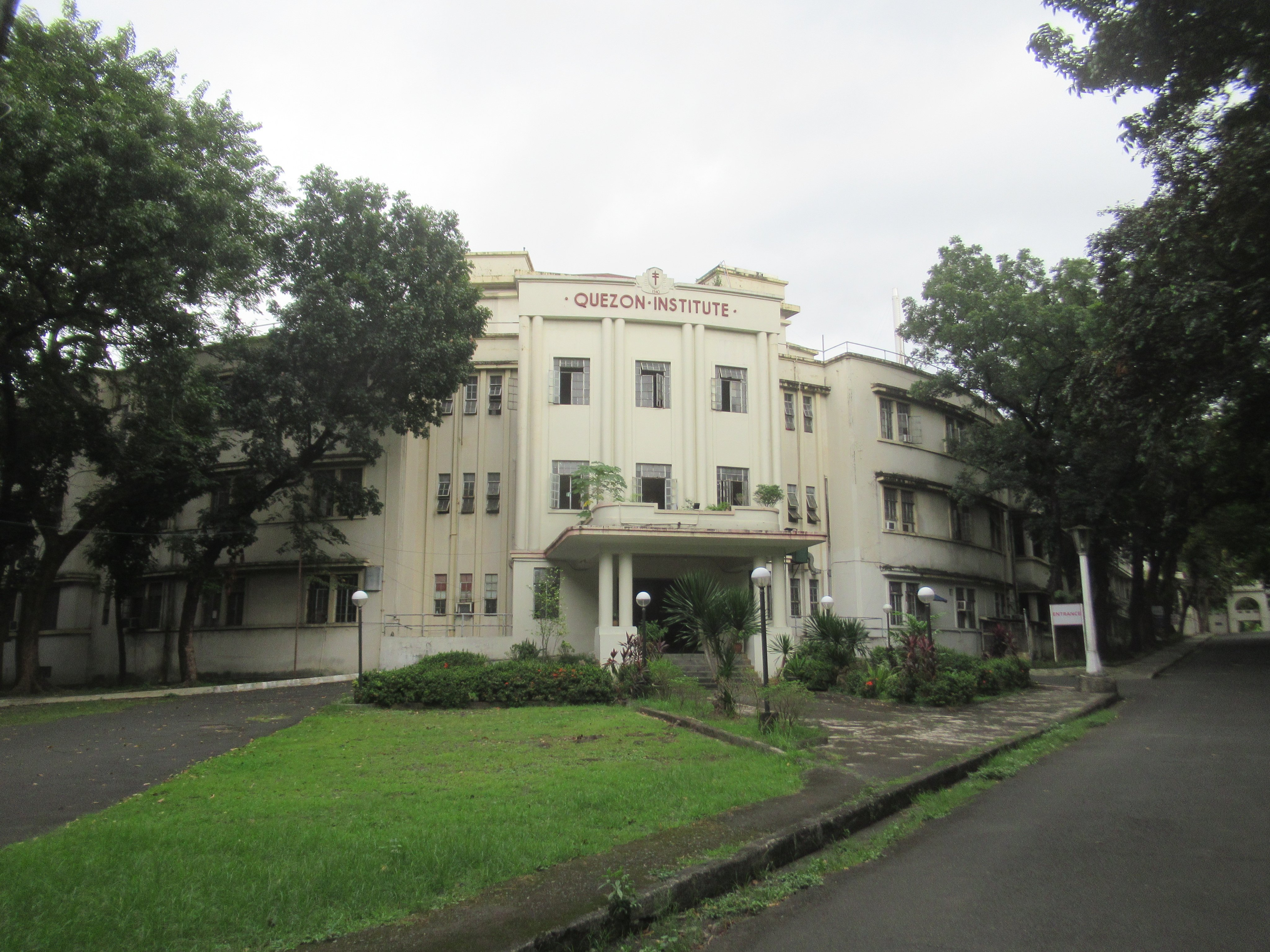
2024 façade

A portion of the hospital's property at E. Rodriguez Sr. Avenue in Quezon City was sold to Puregold. The property also served as the main headquarters of the Philippine Charity Sweepstakes Office (PCSO) until 2010, when it transferred to the Philippine International Convention Center in Pasay.

As early as 2011, Ayala Land became interested in acquiring the property occupied by the Quezon Institute and is planning to convert the property to a mixed used development. Ayala Land expressed its intent in preserving the historic buildings of the complex which then recently became automatically protected under the National Cultural Heritage Act, similar to what it has done with Nielson Tower in Makati. As of 2013, Ayala Land was negotiating with PTSI for a joint venture for its planned development. PTSI plans to move the Quezon Institute to a new site.
