= Taft Commission =

Legislature of the Philippines, 1901–1916

Philippine Commission
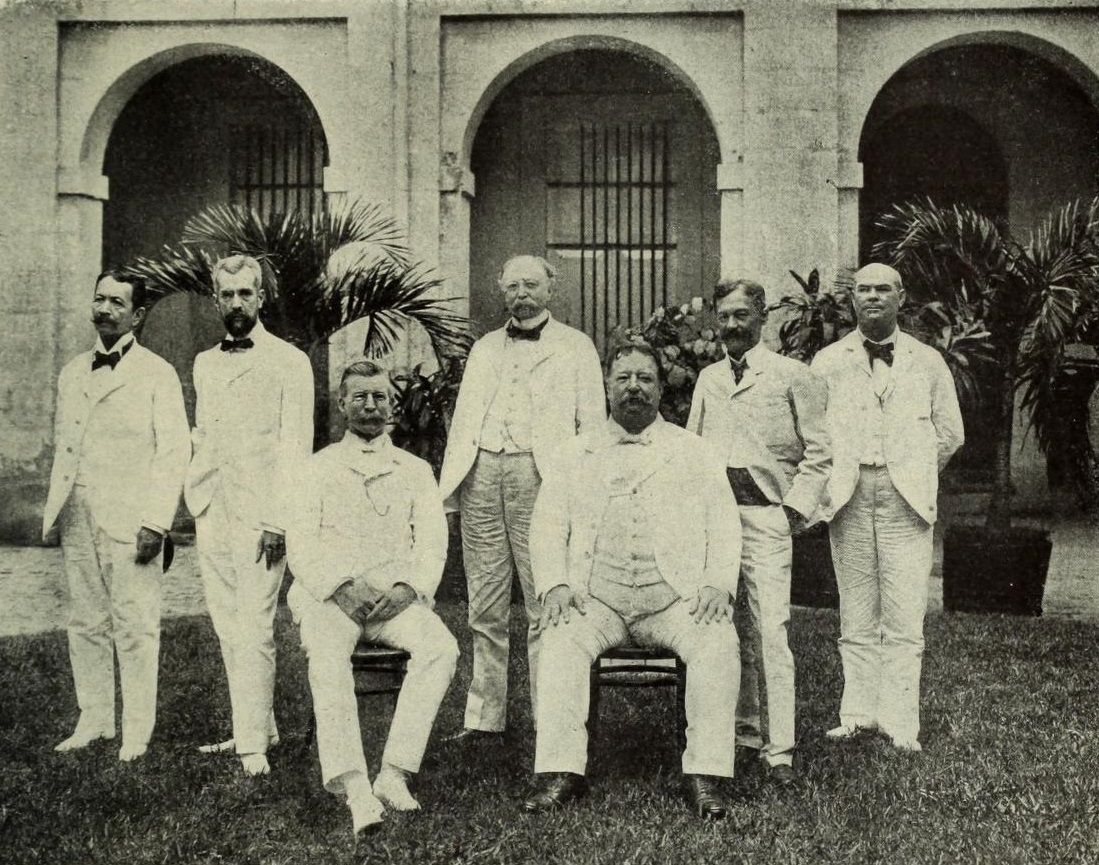

Type
- Type: From 1901–1907; Unicameral; From 1907–1916; Upper house; of the Philippine Legislature

History
- Founded: March 16, 1900
- Disbanded: October 16, 1916
- Preceded by: U.S. military government
- Succeeded by: 4th Philippine Legislature

Leadership
- Governor-General of the Philippines: William Howard Taft
- Seats: 5

The Taft Commission, also known as the Second Philippine Commission (Filipino: Ikalawang Komisyon ng Pilipinas, Spanish: Segunda Comisión de Filipinas), was established by United States President William McKinley on March 16, 1900, following the recommendations of the First Philippine Commission, using presidential war powers while the United States was engaged in the Philippine–American War.

McKinley's letter of instruction to the commission (dated April 7, 1900) defined American policies and intentions which make cultural and economic progress, acquire skill in self-government, and eventually progress to national independence. Emilio Aguinaldo, who led the Philippine war against America, wrote retrospectively in 1957 that McKinley's instructions to the commission would "prove one of the most important documents in the history of international relations."

The Second Commission was at first the sole legislative body of the Philippines, then known as the Philippine Islands under the sovereign control of the U.S. After the passage of the Philippine Organic Act in 1902, the Commission functioned as the house of a bicameral legislature until it was supplanted by an elected legislature established in 1916 by the Philippine Autonomy Act.

William Howard Taft was the first head of the Philippine Commission from March 16, 1900 until July 4, 1901, after which the commission's head also became the Civil Governor of the Philippines. Taft served in that office until January 31, 1904, when he was appointed Secretary of War by President Theodore Roosevelt. Taft was succeeded by vice-governor Luke Edward Wright and the Philippine Commission was subsequently headed by a number of persons, but is often mentioned informally and collectively as the "Taft Commission".

== Background ==
The Second Philippine Commission (the Taft Commission), established by President William McKinley on March 16, 1900, and headed by William Howard Taft, was granted legislative as well as limited executive powers. Between September 1900 and August 1902, it issued 499 laws, established a judicial system, including a Supreme Court, drew up a legal code, and organized a civil service. The 1901 municipal code provided for popularly elected presidentes, vicepresidentes, and councilors to serve on municipal boards. The municipal board members were responsible for collecting taxes, maintaining municipal properties, and undertaking necessary construction projects; they also elected provincial governors.

== Commission membership ==
Members of the Philippine Commission 1900–1916
Original members (Note: An asterisk by the name denotes members who served in the Insular Government as Governor-General of the Philippines)	Period of service
William Howard Taft*	March 16, 1900 – January 31, 1904
Henry Clay Ide*	March 16, 1900 – September 19, 1906
Luke Edward Wright*	March 16, 1900 – March 30, 1906
Dean Conant Worcester	March 16, 1900 – September 15, 1913
Bernard Moses	March 16, 1900 – December 31, 1902
Subsequent Members	Period of service
Benito Legarda	September 1, 1901 – October 31, 1907
Trinidad Pardo de Tavera	September 1, 1901 – February 1909
Jose de Luzuriaga	September 1, 1901 – October 27, 1913
James Francis Smith*	January 1, 1903 – November 10, 1909
William Cameron Forbes*	June 5, 1904 – September 1, 1913
William Morgan Shuster	September 26, 1906 – February 28, 1909
Newton W. Gilbert*	July 6, 1908 – December 1, 1913
Rafael Palma	July 6, 1908 – October 16, 1916
Gregorio S. Araneta	February 25, 1909 – October 27, 1913
Juan Sumulong	March 1, 1909 – October 26, 1913
Frank Branagan	March 2, 1909 – October 26, 1913
Charles Burke Elliott	February 14, 1910 – February 1, 1913
Francis Burton Harrison*	September 2, 1913 – October 16, 1916
Victorino Mapa	October 27, 1913 – October 16, 1916
Jaime C. de Veyra	October 27, 1913 – April 7, 1916
Vicente Ilustre	October 27, 1913 – October 16, 1916
Vicente Singson Encarnacion	October 27, 1913 – October 16, 1916
Henderson Martin	November 29, 1913 – October 16, 1916
Clinton L. Riggs	November 29, 1913 – October 31, 1915
Eugene Elliott Reed	May 24, 1916 – October 16, 1916
Winfred Thaxter Denison	January 27, 1914 – March 31, 1916

== Legislative powers ==
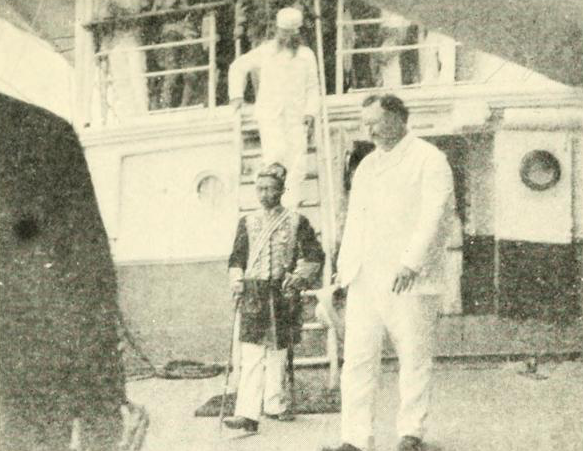
Sultan Jamalul Kiram II with William Howard Taft of the Philippine Commission in Jolo, Sulu (March 27, 1901)

=== Background ===
Article 1, Section 1 of the United States Constitution specifies that the U.S. Congress exercises legislative power. Since the Philippines was in a state of war, however, the Executive Branch ran affairs there without much congressional intervention. President McKinley's instruction to the Philippine Commission in April 1900 directed that, "... Beginning with the 1^{st} day of September 1900, the authority to exercise that part of the power of government in the Philippine Islands which is legislative, is to be transferred from the Military Governor to this commission." The instruction also gave the Commission the power to appoint officers under the judicial, educational, and civil service systems and in the municipal and departmental governments. The instruction charged the Commission, "... In all the forms of government and administrative provisions which they are authorized to proscribe, the Commission should bear in mind that the government which they are establishing is designed not for our satisfaction, or the expression of our theoretical views, but for the happiness, peace, and prosperity of the people of the Philippine islands, and measures adopted should be made to conform to their customs, their habits, and even their prejudices, to the fullest extent consistent with the accomplishment of just and effective government.". Mindful of pacification efforts following the Philippine–American War and as an early step towards to preparing the Philippines for eventual self-governance, in 1903 the commission passed the Pensionado Act establishing a scholarship program for Filipinos to attend school in the United States and allocating $72,000 for the purpose (equivalent to $2,580,000 in 2025).

In a statement published on September 1, 1900, the commissioners announced the holding of public meetings every Wednesday and Friday to allow interested parties to comment and make suggestions on proposed legislative matters. The open sessions were mainly conducted in English and Spanish. As the Americans became familiar with Spanish, the commissioners allowed their guests to use the language of their choice. William Forbes, later Governor General of the Philippines, wrote that he could not remember any instance where a commissioner protested because he could not understand an issue on linguistic grounds.

=== Spooner Amendment ===
A few months before the inauguration of Taft as governor-general, Senator John Spooner filed a bill giving unprecedented powers to the executive branch in the development of colonial policy in the Philippines. The Democrats ferociously attacked the bill, resurrecting anti-imperialist arguments they had employed at the time of the Treaty of Paris. By February 1900, a filibuster was in full cry, with the Democrats determined to curb the powers of the Philippine Commission and reserve for Congress the right to grant franchises and sell lands in the Philippines. The Spooner bill was rejected on September 1, 1900, but McKinley nevertheless granted the Taft commission legislative powers. Legislators repackaged it as an amendment to the 1901 Army Appropriation Bill.

The passage of the Spooner amendment was a significant milestone in the development of U.S.–Philippine policy because it allowed the president to govern the Philippines by the authority of Congress and not by his wartime authority as commander in chief. Emilio Aguinaldo wrote in 1957 that the Spooner Amendment had laid the basis of a far-sighted and enlightened economic policy in the Philippines.

=== Philippine Organic Act ===
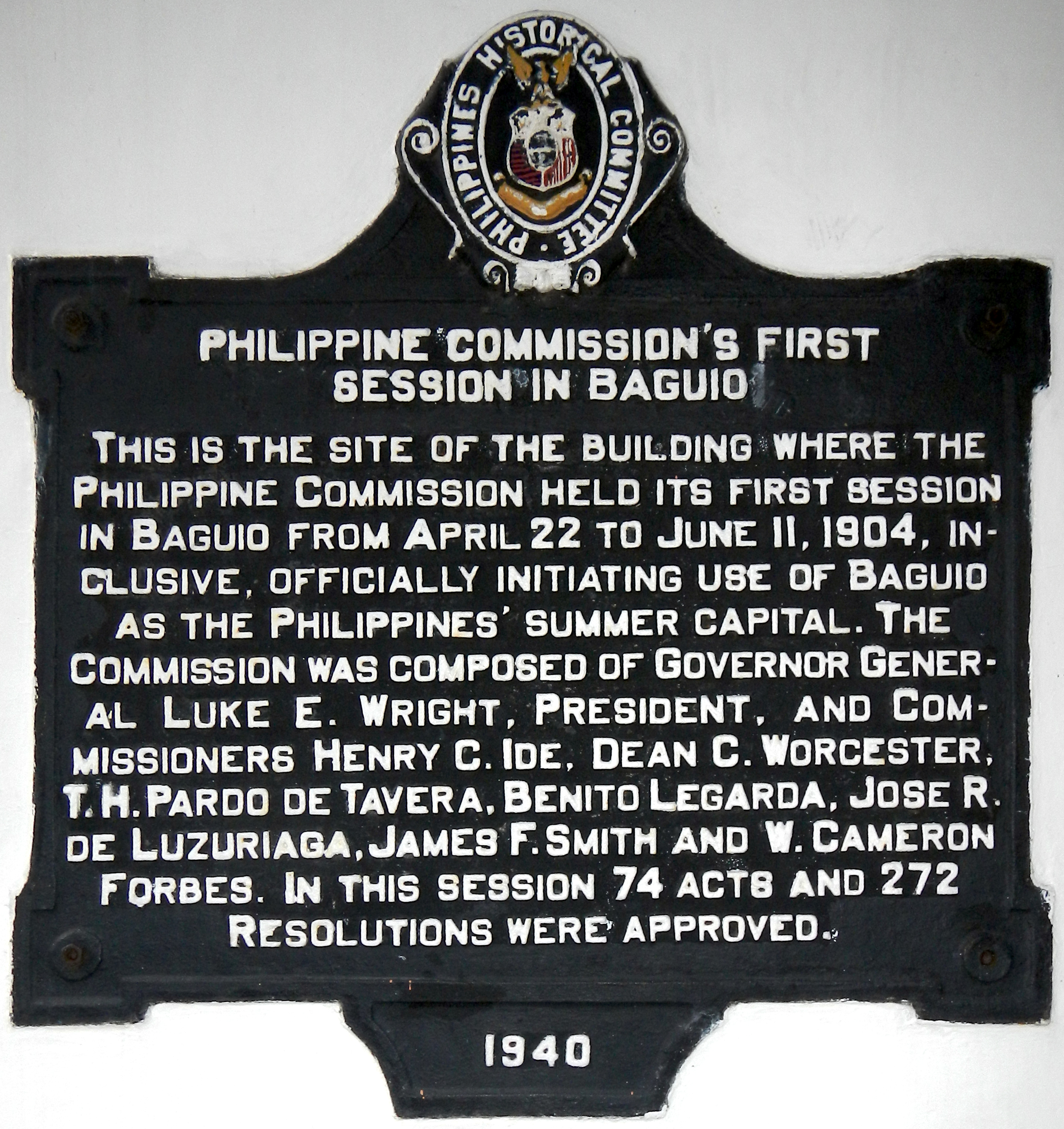
Historical marker near the Baden Powell Hotel on Governor Pack Road in Baguio commemorating the first summer session of the Taft Commission to be held in Baguio, the "Summer Capital of the Philippines."

The Philippine Organic Act of July 1902 was a basic law for the Insular Government (1901–1935). (The term "insular" refers to an unincorporated island territory.) The act provided that future appointments of the civil governor, vice-governor, members the Philippine Commission, and heads of Executive Departments shall be made by the President, by and with the advice and consent of the Senate. The act also provided for the establishment of a bicameral legislature composed of a lower house, the Philippine Assembly, which would be popularly elected, and an upper house consisting of the Philippine Commission. The two houses would share legislative powers, although the upper house alone would pass laws relating to the Moros and other non-Christian peoples. The act also provided for extending the United States Bill of Rights to Filipinos and sending two Filipino resident commissioners to Washington to attend sessions of the United States Congress. The Philippine Assembly elections of 1907 were held on July 30, 1907 and the 1st Philippine Legislature opened its first session on October 16, 1907.

== Legislation ==
The Taft Commission promulgated a total of 157 laws between September 1900 and July 4, 1901, when Taft became Civil Governor, classified as follows:

Classification of Laws Passed by the Philippine Commission
Classification	Quantity	Percent
Local Government	46	29.30
Reorganization of Government Agencies	40	25.48
Appropriations for Government Expenditures	33	21.02
Judicial Reforms	12	7.65
Economic and Tariff	9	5.73
Public Works Projects	7	4.46
Public Health	4	2.55
Anti-Sedition	2	1.27
Church	2	1.27
Education	2	1.27
Totals	157	100.00

Following the advice of McKinley to start at the bottom and gradually move upward, over seventy percent of the laws dealt with local government and the bureaucracy; with more than half of these being acts extending the provision of the Provincial Government Act to the different provinces. Others were acts establishing municipalities, and the rest concerned the local police.

The thirty-three appropriations laws passed were appropriations to pay certain expenses not covered by the General Appropriations Act, including salaries of government employees, burial benefits for victims of the war, funds for the construction of roads and bridges, and other miscellaneous expenses.

=== Specific major items of legislation ===
==== Reorganization of local government units ====
The Commission created and reorganized government offices, including the following:

Act	Office
Act No. 7	Bureau of Statistics
Act No. 16	Bureau of Forestry
Act No. 17	Bureau of Mining
Act No. 20	Office of the Auditor
Act No. 46	Inspectors of Customs
Act No. 157	Board of Health

President McKinley had declared in his message to Congress in December 1899 that Philippine reconstruction should proceed by building up from the bottom. McKinley's instruction to the Commission stressed that the establishment of civilian government should start from the smallest unit of political organization and gradually move towards Manila. In compliance with this, on January 31, 1901, the Commission enacted Act No. 82, a Municipal Code to guide the formation and management of towns, and six days later, Act No. 83, a which dealt with the procedure for the creation of provincial governments. Both acts were titled A General Act for the Organization of Municipal Governments in the Philippines.

In some instances, the Commission doled out government offices to persuade leaders of the resistance movement to give up the fight. General Martin Delgado, for example, was appointed the governor of Iloilo and similar moves were done in Cavite, Bulacan, and Laguna with the appointment of Mariano Trias, Pablo Tecson, and Juan Cailles, respectively.

Members of the Revolutionary Government who later joined the Taft administration
Name	Position under the Aguinaldo Administration	Position under the Taft Administration
Cayetano Arellano	Secretary of State	Chief Justice
Victorino Mapa	Counselor of the Revolutionary Government	Associate Justice
Trinidad Pardo de Tavera	Assistant Secretary of State	Commissioner
Benito Legarda	Vice President of the Malalos Congress	Commissioner
Jose Luzuriaga	President of the Reverend Congress of Panay	Commissioner
Felipe Buencamino	Secretary of State	Civil Service Board
Felix Roxas	Member of the Filipino Junta in Paris	Governor of Batangas
Ignacio Villamor	Malolos Congress delegate	Judge
Gregorio S. Araneta	Secretary of Justice	Solicitor General
Martin Teofilo Delgado	Commanding General of Panay	Governor of Iloilo
Ambrosio Flores	Assistant Secretary of War	Governor of Rizal
Mariano Trias	Secretary of War	Governor of Cavite
Jose Serapio	Colonel of the Revolutionary Army	Governor of Bulacan
Gracio Gonzaga	Secretary of the Interior	Governor of Cagayan
Arsenio Cruz Herrera	Assistant Secretary of Interior	President of the Municipal Board of Manila
Jose Alejandrino	General of the Revolutionary Army	City Engineer of Manila
Modesto Reyes	Member of the Filipino Junta in Paris	City Attorney of Manila
Daniel Tirona	Secretary of War	Provincial Secretary of Cavite
Mariano Cunanan	Major in the Revolutionary Army	Principal Secretary of Pampanga
Mariano Crisostomo	Malolos Congress Delegate	Provincial Fiscal of Bulacan

==== Civil Service Act ====
The first major legislation passed by the commission was Act No. 5, the Civil Service Act, enacted on September 19, 1900. From the passage of this act until the departure of Taft from the Philippines, the number of Americans and Filipinos applying to serve the government continued to increase, as follows:

Period covered	Examined		Passed		Appointed		Percentage appointed	
Period covered	English	Spanish	English	Spanish	English	Spanish	English	Spanish
Up to July 2, 1901	550	821	314	383	126	157	23	19
July 3, 1901 – September 30, 1901	154	259	68	79	89	75	58	29
October 1, 1901 – September 30, 1902	1,267	2,072	794	916	558	515	44	25
October 1, 1902 – September 30, 1903	1,248	3,105	828	1,633	579	820	46	27
Totals	3,219	6,167	2,004	3,011	1,352	1,567	42.00	25.41

==== Education Act of 1901 ====
General Elwell Otis had taken the initiative on September 1, 1898, of establishing a public school system, organizing seven schools in Manila. While the war was raging, American soldiers took time out to organize schools, and to teach classes. When General MacArthur assumed command, he continued the public education project and increased its budget. When the Taft Commission arrived in Manila, the Army had organized 39 schools in Manila with a daily attendance of between 4,500 and 5,000 students.

Commissioner Bernard Moses, who had been an educator at the University of California, worked with Captain Albert Todd and Dr. Fred Atkinson to draft Act No. 74, also known as the Education Act of 1901. The act was largely based on a report which Todd submitted to the Commission on April 17, 1900. Some of the recommendations in the Todd Report were:

- That a comprehensive modern school system for the teaching of elementary English be inaugurated at the earliest possible moment.
- That industrial schools for manual training be established as soon as a fair knowledge of English has been acquired.
- That all schools under government control be conducted in the English language so far as in any way practicable, and that the use of Spanish and the dialects be only for a period of transition.
- That English teachers, well trained in primary instruction, be brought over from the U.S. in sufficient numbers to take charge of the schools of the larger towns at least.
- That a well-equipped normal school be established for instructing natives to be teachers of English.
- That in the larger towns a portion, at least, of the schoolhouse must be made of a modern structure, plainly but well and properly equipped.
- That the school supported by the Government be divorced from the Church. If the natives desire schools in which religious instruction is to be given, that they furnish the entire support for the same from private sources, but attendance from the latter schools shall not excuse the children from attendance at the public school where English is taught. Also, the Parochial Church school, if such are maintained, shall be required to be equal in character of the general instruction to the public school.

On January 21, 1901, the commission enacted Act No. 74, establishing the Department of Public Instruction. Section One of the act provided that primary instruction should be free of charge and open to all Filipinos. Commissioner Bernard Moses became Secretary of Public Instruction and Dr. Atkinson became General Superintendent of Public Instruction. Atkinson was tasked to put up a school in every pueblo and empowered to fix the salaries of teachers, formulate curricula, purchase school supplies, construct school buildings, and disburse the funds of the Department. A Superior Advisory Board assisted Atkinson in policy-making concerning educational needs and the condition of the islands. Act 74 divided the archipelago into divisions composed of school districts and ordered the creation of Normal and Trade schools in Manila and a School of Agriculture in Negros.

At the time Taft arrived in the Philippines, the student-teacher ratio was one teacher for 4,179 students. Section 15 of Act 74 empowered the general superintendent to import 1,000 teachers from the U.S. The first batch of 48 American teachers arrived in June 1901. The second batch of 509 teachers (386 men and 141 women, accompanied by 4 nurses, 13 spouses) arrived in August, and became known as the Thomasites, after the United States Army Transport Thomas, one of the ships which transported them.

From the very start, serious problems threatened the success of the educational program. Problems encountered included opposition from Catholic clerics, language difficulties, health problems and difficulty in adjusting to the tropical climate, financial problems brought on by delayed salary payments, lack of school buildings (many of the 2,167 primary schools existing before the war had either been destroyed or pressed into use by the army as barracks, prisons, or hospitals), etc. Cultural values which had developed under Spanish rule also posed a severe hindrance. The Thomasites had a difficult time convincing their students to give more importance to activities that developed critical thinking than to those which simply required rote memorization, or that coming an hour late or being absent to attend a town fiesta was a big shortcoming.

Another problem encountered was difficulty in promoting equality among the students, as children of wealthy families thought they were entitled to special privileges. Some wealthy parents openly opposed the American educational system because of the insecurities it created. For them, education was a privilege of their class and should not be extended to the common people. They believed that general education would create an imbalance in the country's workforce, with the labor market having a surplus of people seeking white-collars and a shortage of people willing to engage in manual work. To address this concern, education officials propagated the trade and agricultural schools, explaining that graduates of these schools were at par with those earning degrees from the normal school and universities.

As the years went by, the Thomasites won the respect and admiration not only of their students but also of their parents. The parents admired the way the American teachers treated their children and managed classroom activities. Specifically, they lauded the abolition of corporal punishment. The Thomasites' friendliness, informality, and approachability were admired by many Filipinos, who still remembered bad experiences with the aristocratic Spanish.

== Friar lands ==
The instructions of President McKinley to the commission stipulated that it was their duty to make a thorough investigation into the titles of large tracts of land held or claimed by individuals or by religious orders. The commission conducted a series of public hearings into the matter beginning on July 31, 1900, and lasting until November. On November 30, 1900, a 604-page report submitted by the commission discussed the friar lands in detail, recommending that "... the insular government buy the large haciendas of the friars and sell them out as small holdings to the present tenants." In 1902, testifying in the U.S. before the House Committee on Insular Affairs, Taft repeated this recommendation, appraising the market value of the friar lands as between $2,500,000 to $7,000,000 in gold, and proposing that the Insular Government be allowed to float bonds for the purchase of the lands and use the proceeds from the sale of the lands to settle the bonds.

The Philippine Organic Act, enacted in July 1902, authorized the Insular Government to purchase the friar lands, empowering it to issue bonds for the purpose. Taft traveled to Rome in May 1902, meeting with Pope Leo XIII and proposing to buy the lands. The Pope promised to study the issue and expressed support for the American pacification program. On November 18, 1902, Papal representative Jean Baptiste Guidi arrived in Manila to negotiate the sale of the lands. Taft commissioned a survey to determine their market value, and a purchase price of $7,239,784.66 was paid in December 1903 by the Insular Government. The holdings amounted to some 166,000 hectares (410,000 acres), of which one-half was in the vicinity of Manila. The land was eventually resold to Filipinos, some of them tenants but the majority were estate owners.

This was the first program of modern land reform in the Philippines.

== See also ==
- Philippine Commission
- First Philippine Commission
- Congress of the Philippines
- Senate of the Philippines
- House of Representatives of the Philippines

== Sources ==
- Aguinaldo, Emilio (2016), A Second Look at America (Classic Reprint), Fb&c Limited, ISBN 978-1-333-84114-0.
- Blitz, Amy (2000), The Contested State: American Foreign Policy and Regime Change in the Philippines, Rowman & Littlefield, ISBN 0-8476-9935-8.
- Escalante, Rene R. (2007), The Bearer of Pax Americana: The Philippine Career of William H. Taft, 1900–1903, Quezon City, Philippines: New Day Publishers, ISBN 978-971-10-1166-6.
- Kalaw, Maximo M. (1927), The development of Philippine politics, Oriental Commercial.
- Seekins, Donald M. (1993), "The First Phase of United States Rule, 1898–1935", in Dolan, Ronald E. (ed.), Philippines: A Country Study (4th ed.), Washington, D.C.: Federal Research Division, Library of Congress.
- U.S. War Department (1901) Annual Report of the War Department Vol. I, Part 10 – Public Laws and Rules Passed by the Philippine Commission (Nos. 1 – 263). Government Printing Office, Washington.
- Worcester, Dean Conant (1914), The Philippines: Past and Present (vol. 1 of 2), MacMillan, OCLC 614026709.
- Worcester, Dean Conant (1930), The Philippines: Past and Present, MacMillan.
