= National Printing Office =

Philippines government printer

- Formation: November 7, 1901; 125 years ago as Bureau of Public Printing; July 25, 1987; 39 years ago as National Printing Office
- Type: Recognized Government Printer
- Legal status: Active
- Purpose: To continue to provide printing services to government agencies and instrumentalities
- Headquarters: EDSA corner NIA North Road, Diliman, Quezon City
- Region served: Philippines
- Director IV: Nicole M. Bacolod, MPP
- Budget: ₱10.38 million (2020)
- Employees: 324 (2024)
- Website: npo.gov.ph

National Printing Office (NPO) is one of 3 Recognized Government Printers in the Philippines (together with Bangko Sentral ng Pilipinas and the Apo Production Unit). It was first established in 1901 as the Philippine Bureau of Printing. It is an instrumentality of the Government entrusted with the tasks of printing and binding routine Government publications, public documents, the Official Gazette, and other official forms.

== History ==
=== Establishment and Early Years of the Bureau of Printing ===
On November 7, 1901, the Philippine Commission enacted Act No. 296 to create the Bureau of Printing as the pioneer of the Philippine printing industry. Throughout its history, the Bureau has been placed under different government offices. It was initially under the Department of Public Instruction until 1918, when it was placed under the Department of Finance.

=== Transfers and Changes in Government Offices ===
In 1947, it was transferred to the Office of the President and nine years later in 1958, it was placed under the Department of General Services.

=== Formation of the National Printing Office ===
In 1986, under the presidency of Corazon Aquino through the virtue of Executive Order No. 285, the Bureau was merged with the printing unit of the Philippine Information Agency to form the National Printing Office. Through the same order, it was placed under the Office of the Press Secretary, which is today known as the Presidential Communications Operations Office and under which the NPO remains today.

=== Leadership and Development under John Sylvannus Leech ===
The first Director of the Bureau of Printing was John Sylvannus Leech. Under his term, the Apprenticeship System was adopted in the Bureau to train future printers in the agency's operations. Among the apprentices who benefited from this program was Pablo Lucas, who went on to be the first Filipino Director of Printing.

== Functions ==
The NPO has printing jurisdiction over the:

- Printing, binding, and distribution of all Standard and Accountable Forms of the National and Local Governments, including Government-Owned and Controlled Corporations
- Printing of Official Ballots; and
- Printing of public documents such as the Official Gazette of the Republic of the Philippines, the General Appropriations Act, Philippine Reports and development information materials of the Philippine Information Agency.

Together with other recognized government printers, the NPO is tasked with the printing of Accountable Forms and Sensitive High Quality/Volume requirements of the government. Besides the other jobs listed above, the NPO may also accept other government printing jobs, including government publications. However, these are engaged in a non-exclusive basis.

== Officials ==
The National Printing Office is currently headed by Director Nicole M. Bacolod, MPP (2026). She leads the following officials:

- Engr. Neil L. Macaraeg, Superintendent of Printing
- Engr. Benedicto M. Cabral, Assistant Superintendent concurrent Acting Chief of the Production Planning and Control Division
- Jean Paul C. Melegrito, Acting Chief of the Administrative Division
- Yolanda B. Marcelo, Chief, Financial Management Division
- Roy-Leo C. Pablo, Acting Chief of the Composing Division
- Dante R. So, Acting Chief of the Photolithographic Division
- Sofia M. Batilaran, Acting Chief of the Sales and Management Division
- Napoleon G. Gonzales, Chief of the Press Division
- Lethelyn C. Samosa, Acting Chief of the Finishing Division
- Engr. Benedict J. Sagun, Acting Chief of the Engineering Division
