= León Apacible =

Filipino lawyer and revolutionary

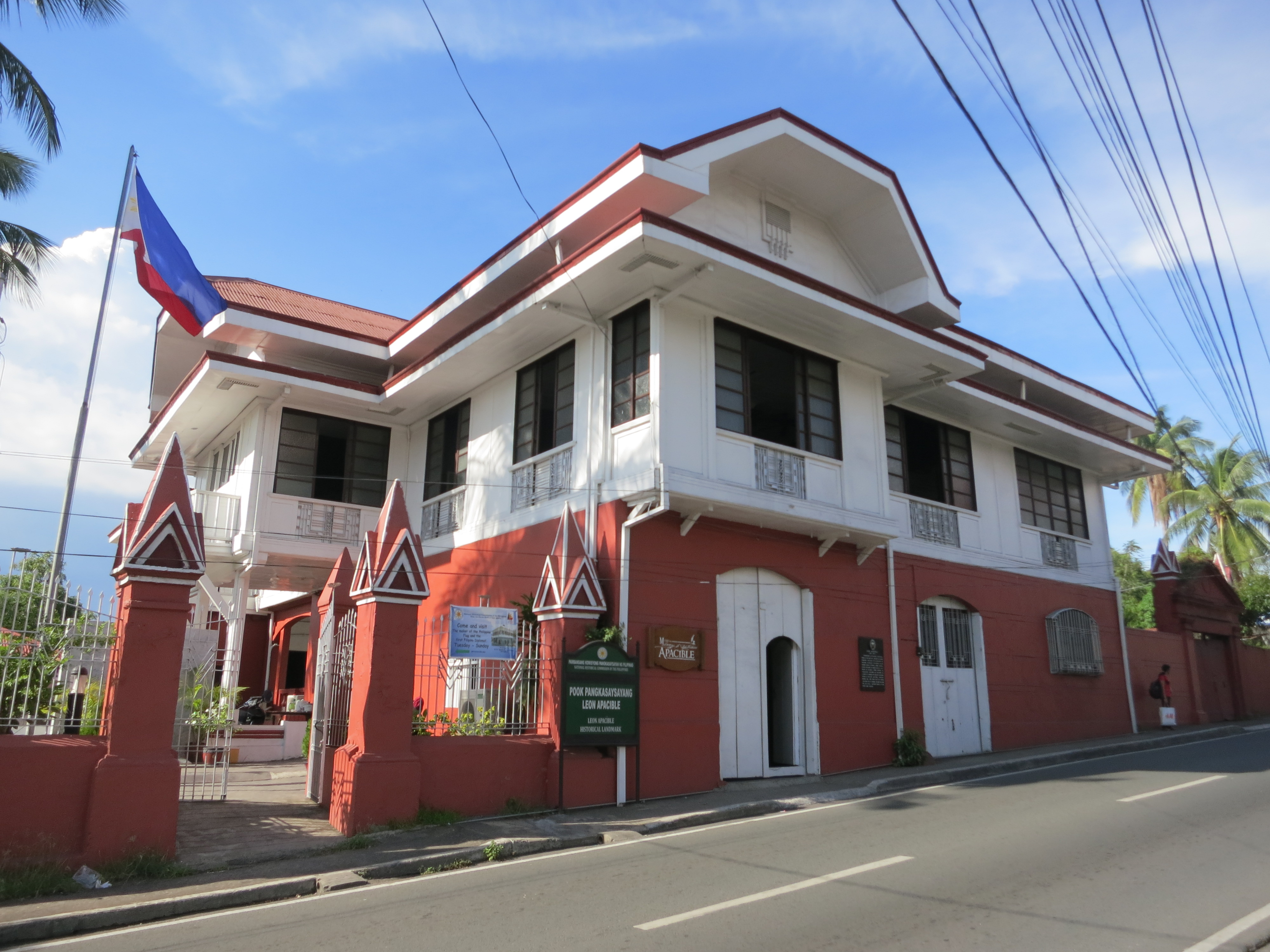
House of Leon Apacible in Taal, Batangas and which now serves as a museum in his and his brother's honor.

Don León Apacíble (October 25, 1861 – 1901) was a Filipino lawyer, judge, propagandist, and revolutionary.

== Biography ==
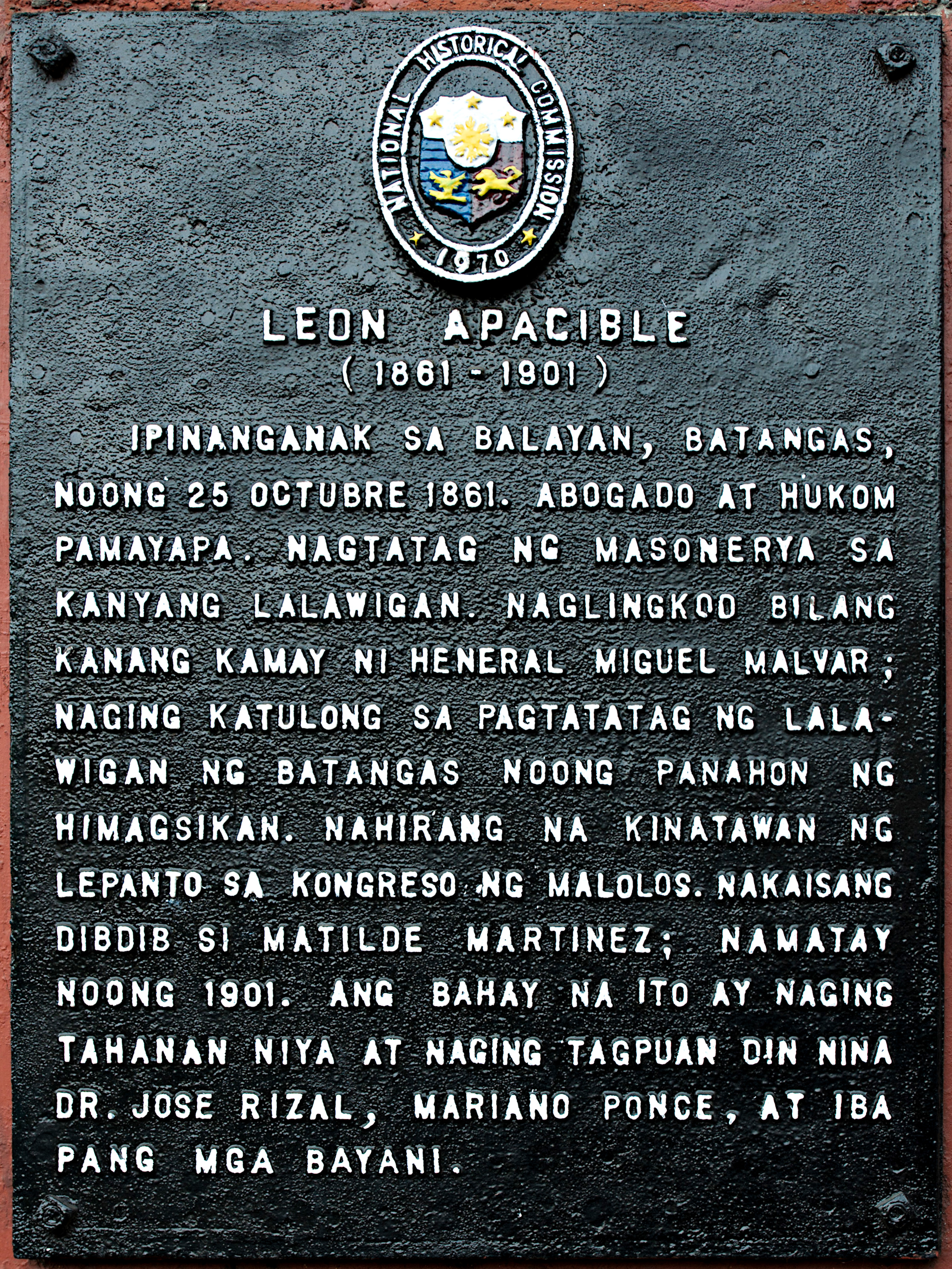
National historiccal marker installed at Apacible's ancestral house in Taal, Batangas in 1973

Apacible was born on 25 October 1861 to Vicente Apacible and Catalina Castillo. He met national hero and cousin José Rizal while attending Ateneo Municipal de Manila. He boarded with Rizal and his brother, Galicano, who also became one of the political figures of the revolution. Leon’s mother asked Rizal to be her son’s advisor and guide. Like Rizal, Leon excelled in school and later studied law at the University of Santo Tomas. Leon earned his licentiate in jurisprudence at only 23 years old. He practiced law in Batangas where he also found Masonry. After, he became a judge of the Court of First Instance of Batangas City.

In 1890, his house in Taal became one of the meeting places of the resistance leaders. In 1892, he was deported to Lepanto in the Cordillera. He was released from exile after the signing of the Pact of Biak-na-Bato. When he returned to Batangas, he joined General Miguel Malvar’s forces and became his right-hand man. In 1898, Apacible led his own force of soldiers against Spain in capturing Batangas City. That year, he was appointed as the Finance Officer of Batangas by President Emilio Aguinaldo. He was appointed as representative of Lepanto to the Malolos Congress.

Apacible died in 1901. His only son, Leon Jr., married Consolacion Noble and their only daughter, Corazon Apacible Cañisa, became mayor of Taal in 1975.

== Collections ==
- A kalesa owned by the family of León Apacible, a member of the commission that drafted the Malolos Constitution displayed in the Presidential Car Museum in Quezon Memorial Circle, Quezon City, Philippines.
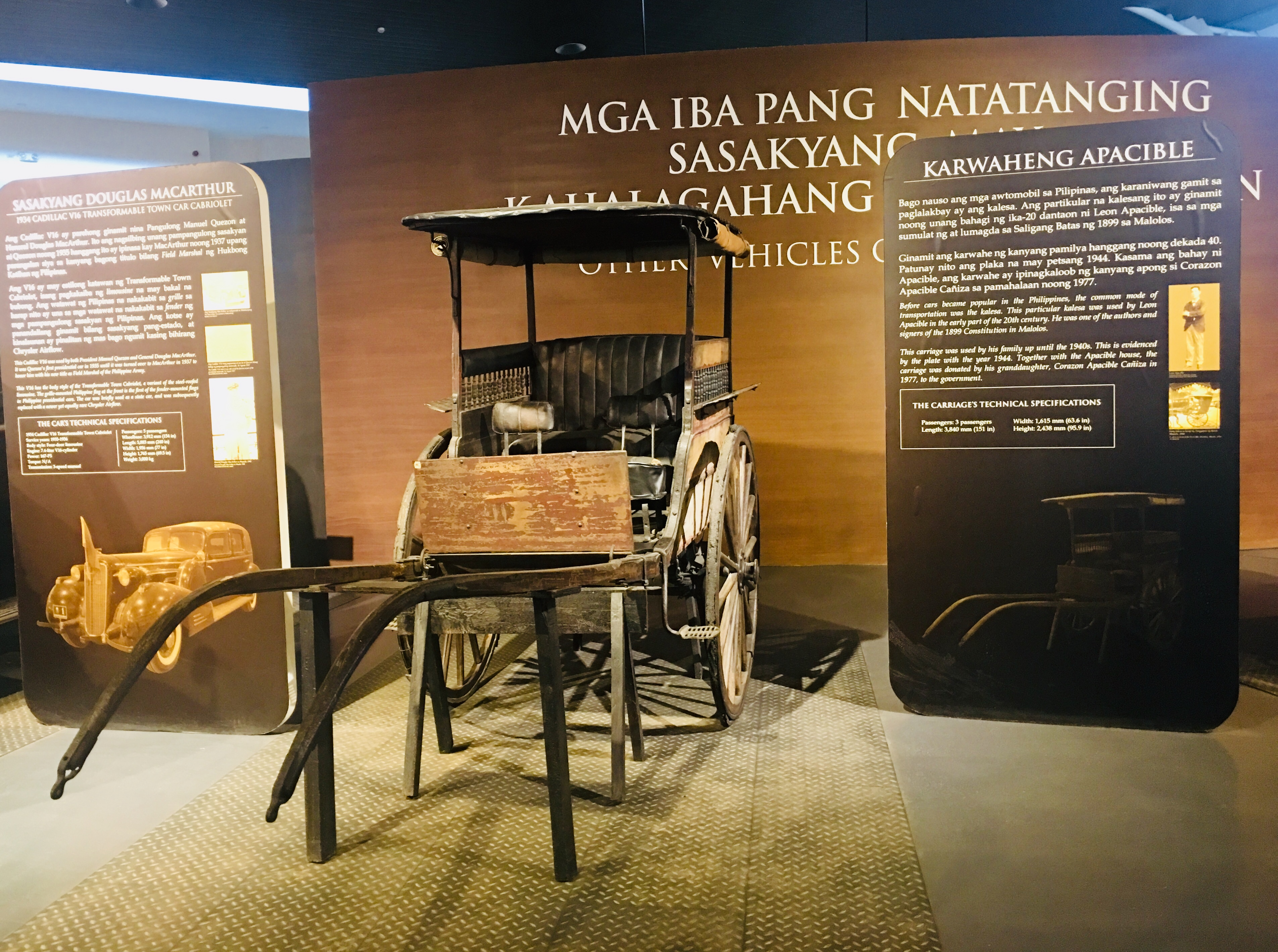
  Kalesa of Don Leon Apacible
