= Macario Adriatico =

Filipino revolutionist, journalist, and politician (1869–1919)

The Honorable Macario Adriático
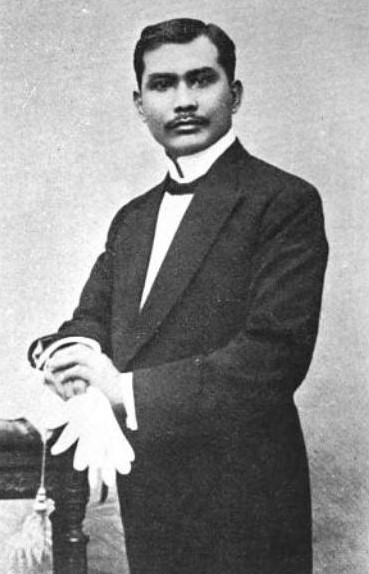
- Adriático as a member of the Philippine Assembly, 1908

Director of the Philippine Library and Museum
- In office July 1917 – April 14, 1919
- Preceded by: Feliciano Basa
- Succeeded by: Enrique V. Filamor

Majority Floor Leader of the Philippine Assembly
- In office 1912–1914
- Preceded by: Alberto Barretto
- Succeeded by: Galicano Apacible

Member of the Philippine Assembly from Mindoro's lone district
- In office October 16, 1907 – March 1, 1914
- Preceded by: District established
- Succeeded by: Mariano P. Leuterio

Personal details
- Born: March 10, 1869 Calapan, Mindoro, Captaincy General of the Philippines
- Died: April 14, 1919 (aged 50) Santa Mesa, Manila, Philippine Islands
- Party: Nacionalista
- Spouse: Paula Lazaro
- Parents: Luciano Adriatico (father); Natalia Gonzales (mother)
- Education: San Juan de Letran College; University of Santo Tomas
- Occupation: Lawyer; journalist; politician
- Writing career
- Language: Spanish

Macario Adriático y Gonzáles (March 10, 1869 – April 14, 1919) was a Filipino lawyer, journalist and politician from Mindoro. He was credited for the creation of the city charter of Manila.

== Early life and education ==
Macario Adriatico was born in Calapan, Mindoro. His parents were Luciano Adriatico, a government official, and Natalia Gonzales.

After completing his primary education in Mindoro, Adriatico was sent to Manila in 1882 for further studies. He entered the schools of Hipolito Magsalin and Enrique Mendiola.

In 1889, he earned a degree in Bachelor of Arts from San Juan de Letran College. He pursued medicine studies at University of Santo Tomas, but later changed to law. He was married to Paula Lazaro.

== Career ==
=== Military career ===
Adriatico participated during the Philippine Revolution against Spain. In 1898, he helped the revolutionary forces from Batangas sent by Emilio Aguinaldo to defeat the Spanish troops in Calapan, Mindoro. He also organized an expeditionary force that liberated Romblon.

During the Philippine-American War, he served as comandante de estado mayor or staff commander for the Philippine forces in Panay from 1899 to 1901.

=== Journalism career ===
Adriatico began his writing career with La Moda Filipina. He also directed the political newspapers El Diario de Filipinas and La Independencia. At the time of entering politics in 1907, Adriatico was a journalist and law professor.

=== Political career ===
From 1907 to 1914, he served as assemblyman from Mindoro from the first to third Philippine legislatures during the American occupation in the country. As a politician, Adriatico authored the city charter of Manila. In 1912, he became the majority floor leader of the Assembly. He resigned during his third term in 1914, when he was appointed member of the Code Committee.

=== Later career ===
From 1917 to 1919, Adriatico was designated as the first Filipino director of the Philippine Library and Museum.

== Death and recognition ==
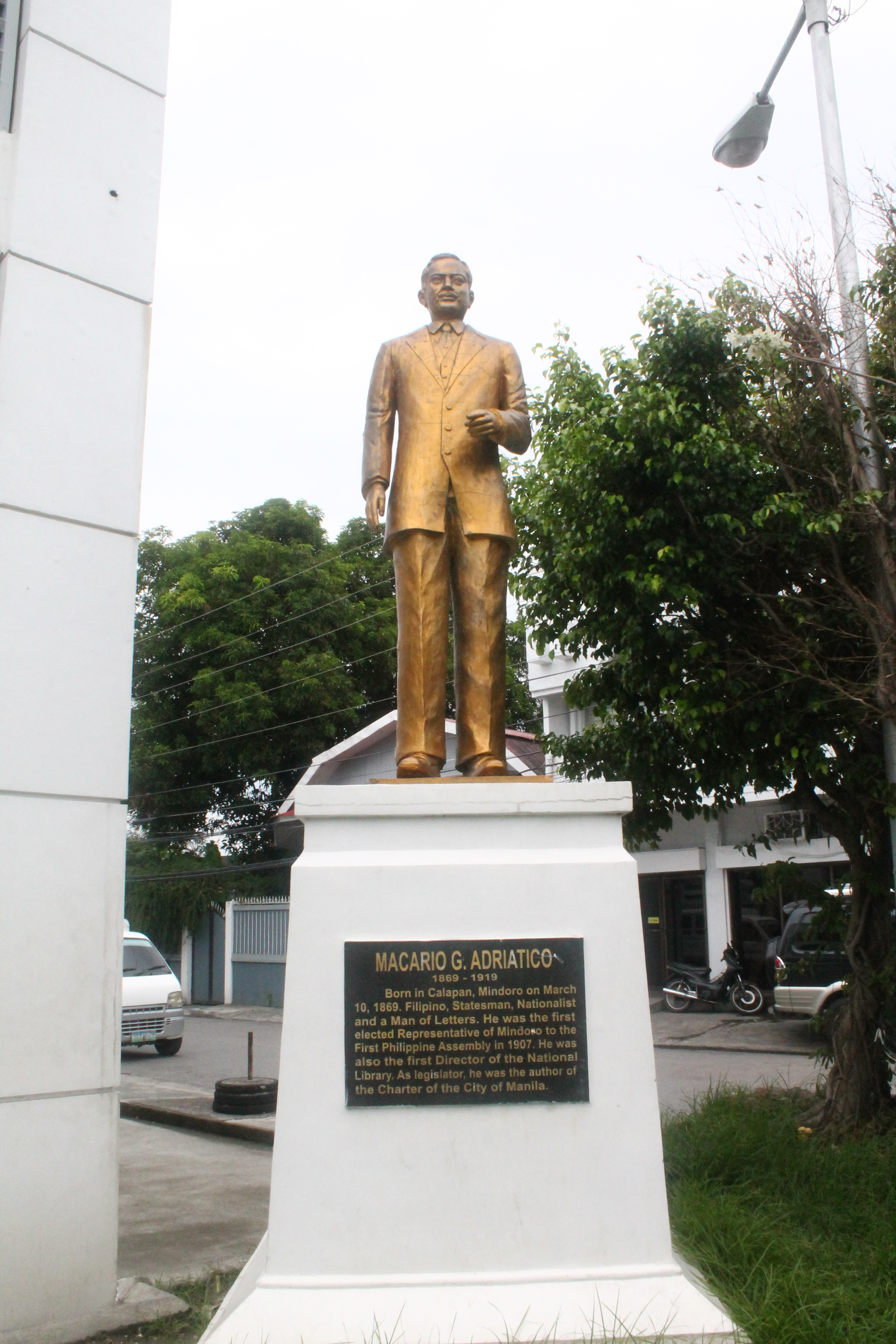
Monument at Calapan, Mindoro

Adriatico died on April 14, 1919, in Manila.

In 1933, Calapan Central School was renamed Adriatico Memorial School in his honor, and in 1964, Dakota Street in Manila was renamed after him. A barangay in Gloria, Oriental Mindoro is also named after him.
