= Army Appropriations Act of 1901 =

US federal legislation

The Army Appropriations Act of 1901 (31 Stat. 895, enacted 2 March 1901 by Pres. William McKinley), enacted in the years following the Spanish–American War and the resulting 1898 Treaty of Paris, is primarily known for:

- the Platt Amendment (31 Stat. 897), defining the terms of Cuban independence
- the Spooner Amendment (31 Stat. 910), defining the terms of Philippine independence
