= Galicano Apacible =

Filipino physician and politician

The Honorable Galicano Apacible
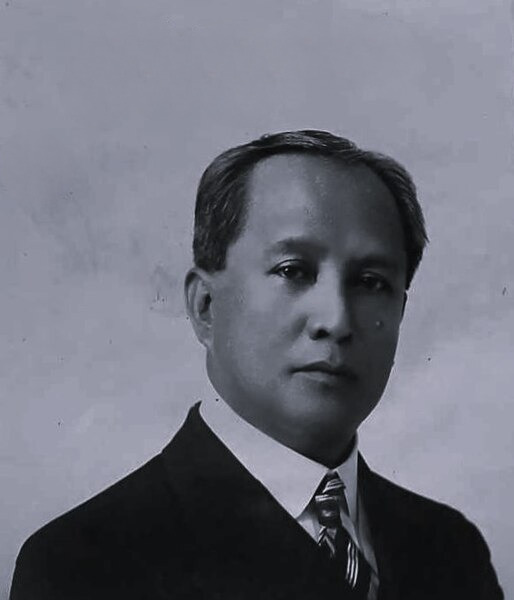
- Apacible on his U.S. passport application in 1919

Secretary of Agriculture and Natural Resources
- In office January 11, 1917 – October 31, 1921
- Preceded by: Post created
- Succeeded by: Rafael Corpus

Majority Floor Leader of the Philippine Assembly
- In office 1914–1916
- Preceded by: Macario Adriatico
- Succeeded by: Rafael Alunan Sr.

Member of the Philippine Assembly from Batangas's 1st district
- In office October 16, 1909 – October 16, 1916
- Preceded by: Felipe Agoncillo
- Succeeded by: Ramón Diokno

5th Governor of Batangas
- In office 1907–1909
- Preceded by: José Lozada
- Succeeded by: Pablo Borbon

Personal details
- Born: Galicano Apacible Antonio y del Castillo; June 25, 1864 Balayan, Batangas, Captaincy General of the Philippines
- Died: March 22, 1949 (aged 84) Manila, Philippines
- Resting place: Manila Memorial Park – Sucat, Paranaque, Philippines
- Party: Nacionalista
- Spouse: Concepcion Castillo
- Occupation: Politician

Galicano Apacible Antonio y del Castillo (June 25, 1864 – March 22, 1949) was a Filipino physician and politician from Balayan Batangas. A cousin to José Rizal, he co-founded La Solidaridad and the Nacionalista Party.

== Early life and education ==
Apacible was born in Balayan, Batangas on June 25, 1864. He was the youngest of three children of Vicente Apacible and Catalina Castillo. He completed his elementary education in Batangas before moving to Manila to take secondary studies at a private school owned by Benedicto Luna and later the Colegio de San Juan de Letran. During this time, he lived with his older brother Leon and cousin, Jose Rizal, in a rented accommodation in Intramuros. He pursued a degree in medicine at the University of Santo Tomas but decided to continue his studies in Spain after a dispute with a Dominican priest. He received a bachelor's degree at the Instituto del Tarragona and a licentiate in medicine and surgery from the University of Barcelona in 1889. He pursued a doctorate in medicine from the Central University of Madrid but did not complete his course.

== Career ==
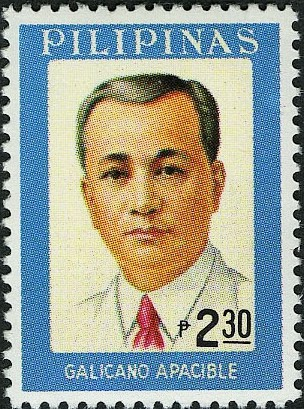
Apacible on a 1977 stamp of the Philippines

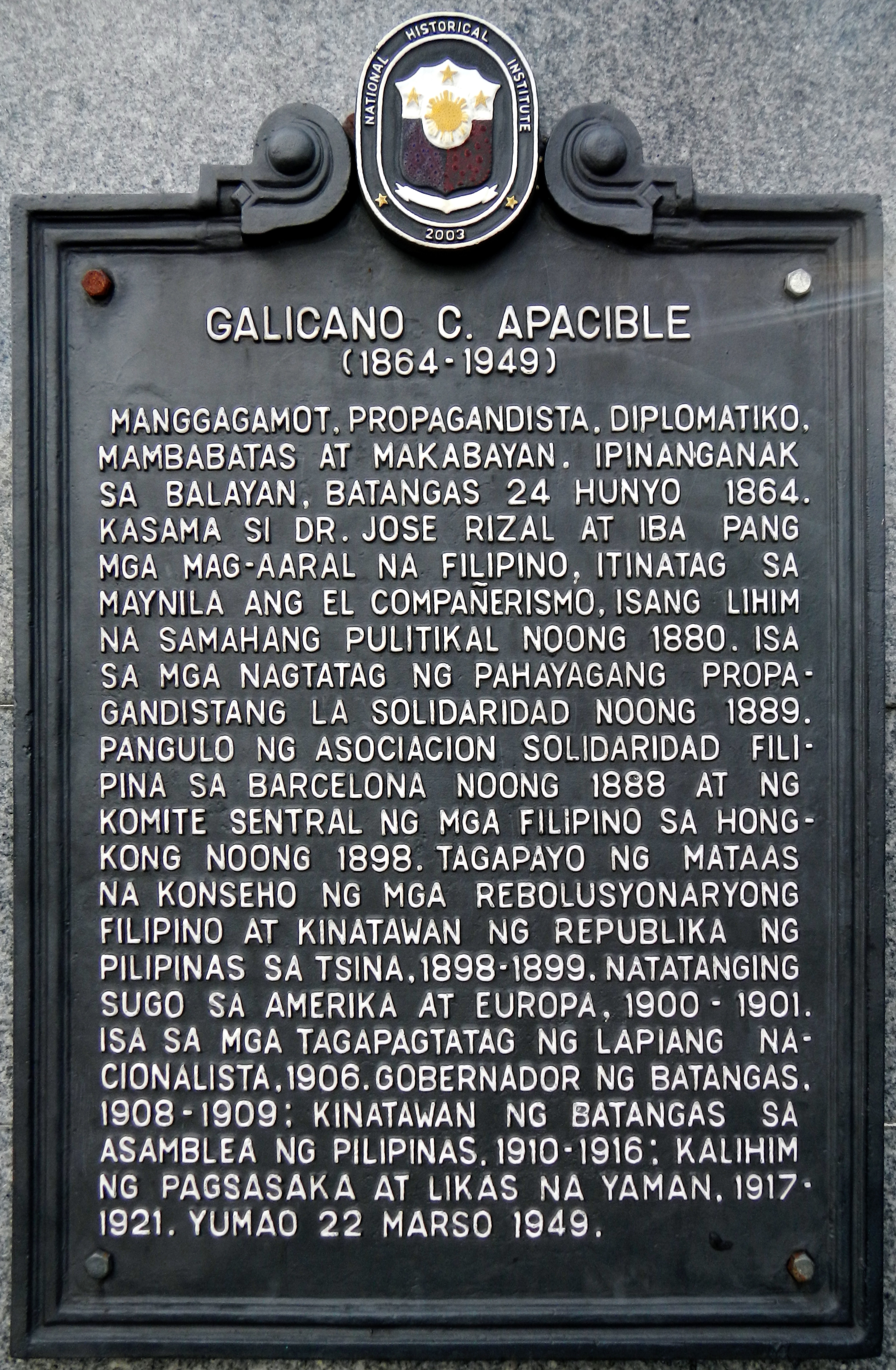
Historical marker installed in 2003 in Balayan, Batangas

Apacible participated in political movements in Spain and became president of the Filipino reformist organization La Solidaridad. He was suspected by the Spanish colonial government in Manila of subversion over his political activities and Freemasonry. After returning to the Philippines in 1892 and learning that his brother Leon had been exiled to Lepanto while his cousin Rizal was sent to Dapitan, he fled to Hong Kong with Rizal's family to avoid arrest.

During the Philippine Revolution he served as an advisor to the Alto Consejo de los Revolucionarios and became administrator of the Comite Central Filipino. In 1899, the Philippine revolutionary government sent him and Rafael del Pan to the United States to negotiate with the US government. He wrote a piece titled To the American People, an Appeal, in which he tried to plead with the people of the United States to pressure its government not to invade his newly independent country. He also pleaded the cause of Philippine independence in his travels to the United Kingdom and Canada and frequently met with groups opposed to the US annexation.

After the Philippine-American War, Apacible returned to the Philippines and practiced medicine in Manila. From 1906 to 1907, he worked at the San Lazaro Hospital.

In 1907, he entered elected politics and was elected as governor of Batangas from 1907 to 1909 and representative of the First District of Batangas to the Philippine Assembly from 1909 to 1916. He was then named Secretary of Agriculture and Natural Resources in 1917, serving until 1921 when resigned due to illness. He also served as vice president of the Nacionalista Party.

== Later life and death ==
Apacible was severely injured in an accident in 1944 and went blind in 1947. He died on March 2, 1949, and was buried at the La Loma Cemetery and eventually transferred to the Manila Memorial Park in Parañaque City.
