= Sixto de los Angeles =

Filipino forensic pathologist (1875–1945)

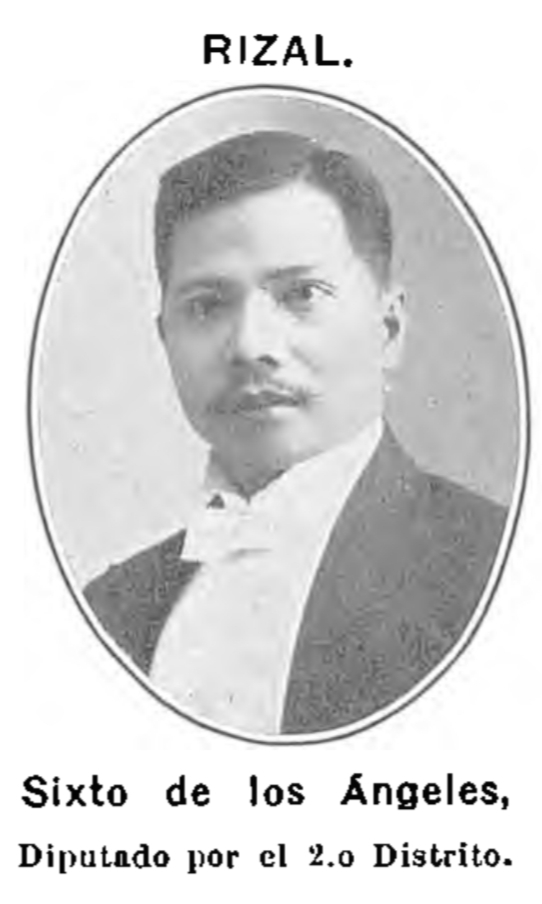
- De los Angeles as member of the Philippine Assembly, c. 1913

Member of the Philippine Assembly from Rizal's 2nd district
- In office October 16, 1912 – July 12, 1915
- Preceded by: José Tupas
- Succeeded by: Leandro A. Jabson

Personal details
- Born: Sixto de los Ángeles y Manahan; August 6, 1875 San Mateo, Manila, Captaincy General of the Philippines
- Died: December 23, 1945 (aged 70)
- Party: Nacionalista
- Education: Colegio de San Juan de Letran; University of Santo Tomas
- Scientific career
- Occupations: physician, forensic pathologist
- Fields: Forensic Medicine; Criminal anthropology
- Workplaces: Colegio Medico Farmaceutico de Filipinas; University of the Philippines

Sixto de los Ángeles y Manahan (August 6, 1875 — December 23, 1945) was a Filipino forensic pathologist and physician who became a member of the Philippine Assembly from 1912 to 1915, representing Rizal's 2nd congressional district. He was sometimes referred to as "The Father of Philippine Forensic Medicine".

== Biography ==
De los Angeles was born in San Mateo, then part of the province of Manila, on August 6, 1875. He pursued his secondary education at Señor Enrique Mendiola's school, later known as Instituto Burgos. In 1887, he entered the Colegio de San Juan de Letran then in 1892 to 1898, he studied medicine at the University of Santo Tomas over which he gained his medical degree.

=== Early medical career ===
De los Angeles became a practicing physician in Lucena, Tayabas (now Quezon), and founded a hospital in that province. He also became Chief of Military Health in the province of Tayabas. Aside from his career in public health, he also created a Tagalog magazine in San Mateo, Rizal.

In 1901, he participated during the Philippine-American War on behalf of the revolutionaries under General Licerio Geronimo. He became a respondent for the wounded in San Juan del Monte, Rizal and established a hospital there. After the establishment of the civil government by the Americans, he was appointed President of the Rizal Provincial Board of Health until 1903. He then focused on his agricultural properties in the province.

In 1905, De los Angeles returned to practice as a medical doctor in the city of Manila. He was a physician at San Juan de Dios Hospital and hospitals in San Pablo, La Laguna.

He became President of the Association of Filipino Physicians, President of the Colegio Medico-Farmaceutico de Filipinas, Treasurer of the Liga Nacional Filipina, and member and delegate from the province of Rizal in the Asociacion Economica de Filipinas.

=== Political career ===
In 1912, he was elected to the Philippine Assembly as representative from the second district of Rizal. He was appointed chairman of the Committee on Health and acting chairman of the Committee on Agriculture. He resigned when he was appointed member of the Public Welfare Board on April 3, 1915.

=== Post-political life ===
From 1915 to 1937, De los Angeles became the Head and Professor of the Department of Legal Medicine, University of the Philippines. During his time there, the Legislature allows city fiscal and prosecuting attorneys across the islands to seek help from the department of legal medicine to investigate sudden deaths or deaths suspected to involve unlawful acts or foul play. De los Angeles has not traveled abroad, but his contributions, including his studies in criminal anthropology in the Philippines, are recognized in other countries. He was known as the author of the monthly pamphlet, "Tuberculosis in the Philippines" and was an associate editor for the Journal of the Philippine Medical Association. He was also president of the Philippines Anti-Tuberculosis Society. He retired from government service in 1938.

== Personal life ==
He married Juliana Alberto from San Mateo in 1899. They had seven children.

== Andres Bonifacio's bones ==
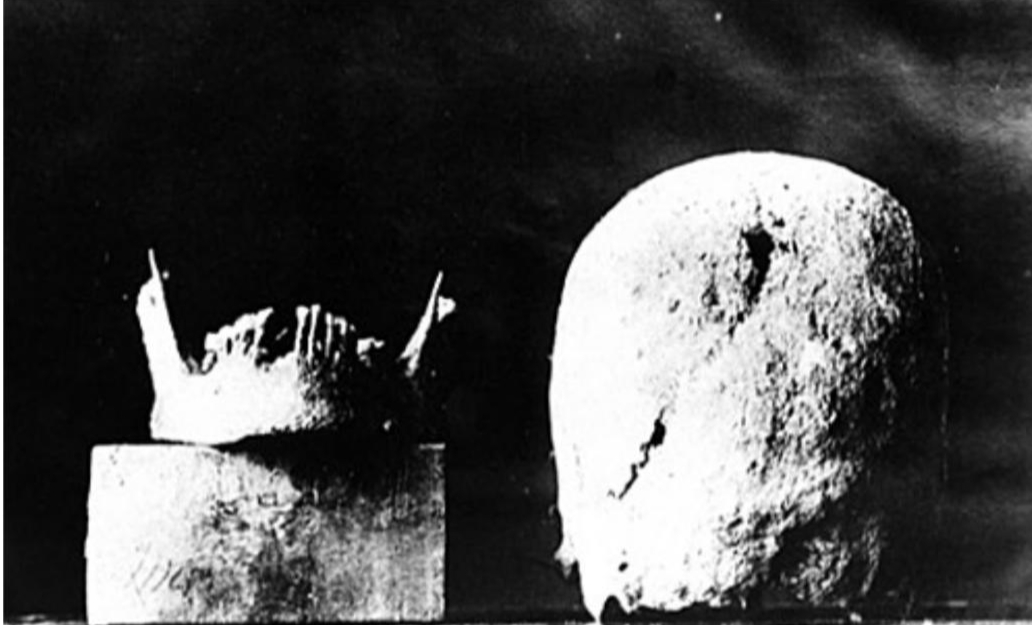
Alleged bones of Andres Bonifacio, photographed and examined in 1918

In January 1918, remains of a man were found at Maragondon, Cavite. According to speculation, it was believed to be the remains of Katipunan leader Andres Bonifacio. In April 1918, De los Angeles and two colleagues examined the bones, including a skull and mandible, at the Philippine General Hospital. They reported on the victim's gender, age, ethnicity, and probable cause of death. De los Angeles did not confirm the bones were from the Katipunan Supremo. The remains were lost in 1926.

== Works and publications ==
De los Angeles made researches on three major topics: legal medicine, folk medicine, and crime.

Here are some of his works and publications:

- “Proyecto de reformas en el ramo de sanidad de la Provincia de Rizal y proposicion para el establecimiento de un hospital provincial.” (December 1902)
- “Contribucion al estudio de beri-beri” (May 1910)
- “Reglas de higiene y de desinfeccion con las precauciones que deben tomarse en el caso de una invasion colerica.” (March 1902)
