= Charles B. Elliott =

American judge

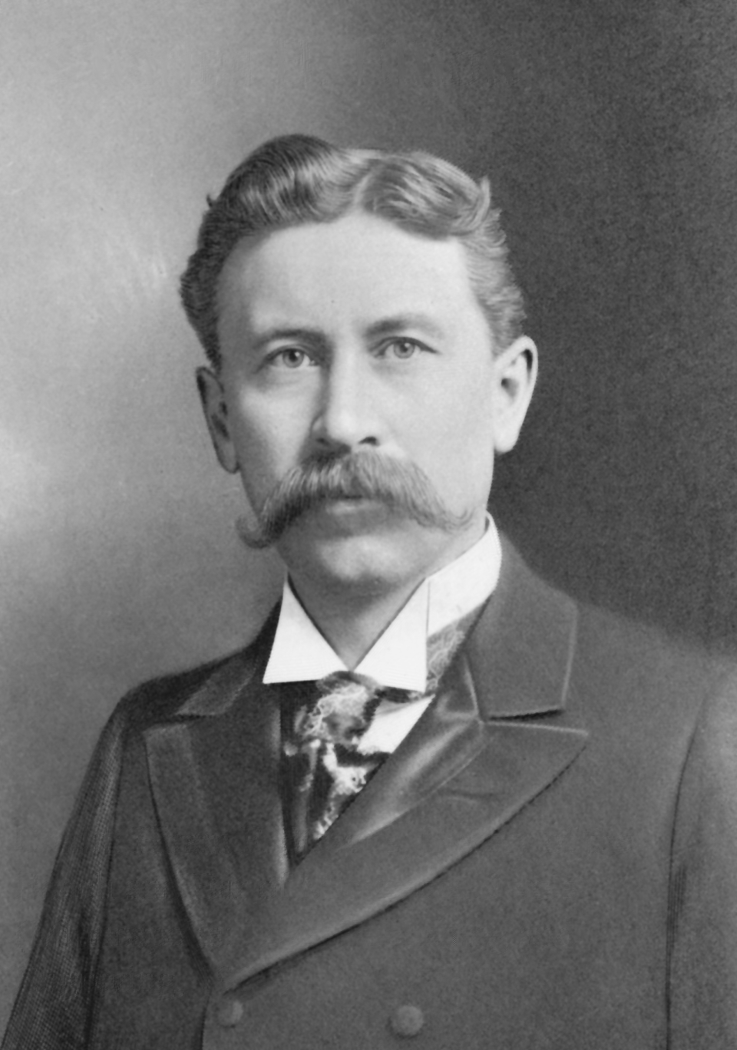
- Elliott in c. 1904

Philippine Secretary of Commerce and Police
- In office 1910–1912
- Appointed by: William Cameron Forbes
- Preceded by: William Cameron Forbes
- Succeeded by: Clinton L. Riggs

Associate Justice of the Supreme Court of the Philippines
- In office 1909–1910

Associate Justice of the Minnesota Supreme Court
- In office 1905–1909

Personal details
- Born: January 6, 1861 Morgan County, Ohio, United States
- Died: September 18, 1935 (aged 74) Minneapolis, Minnesota, United States

Charles Burke Elliott (January 6, 1861 – September 18, 1935) was an American jurist.

== Biography ==
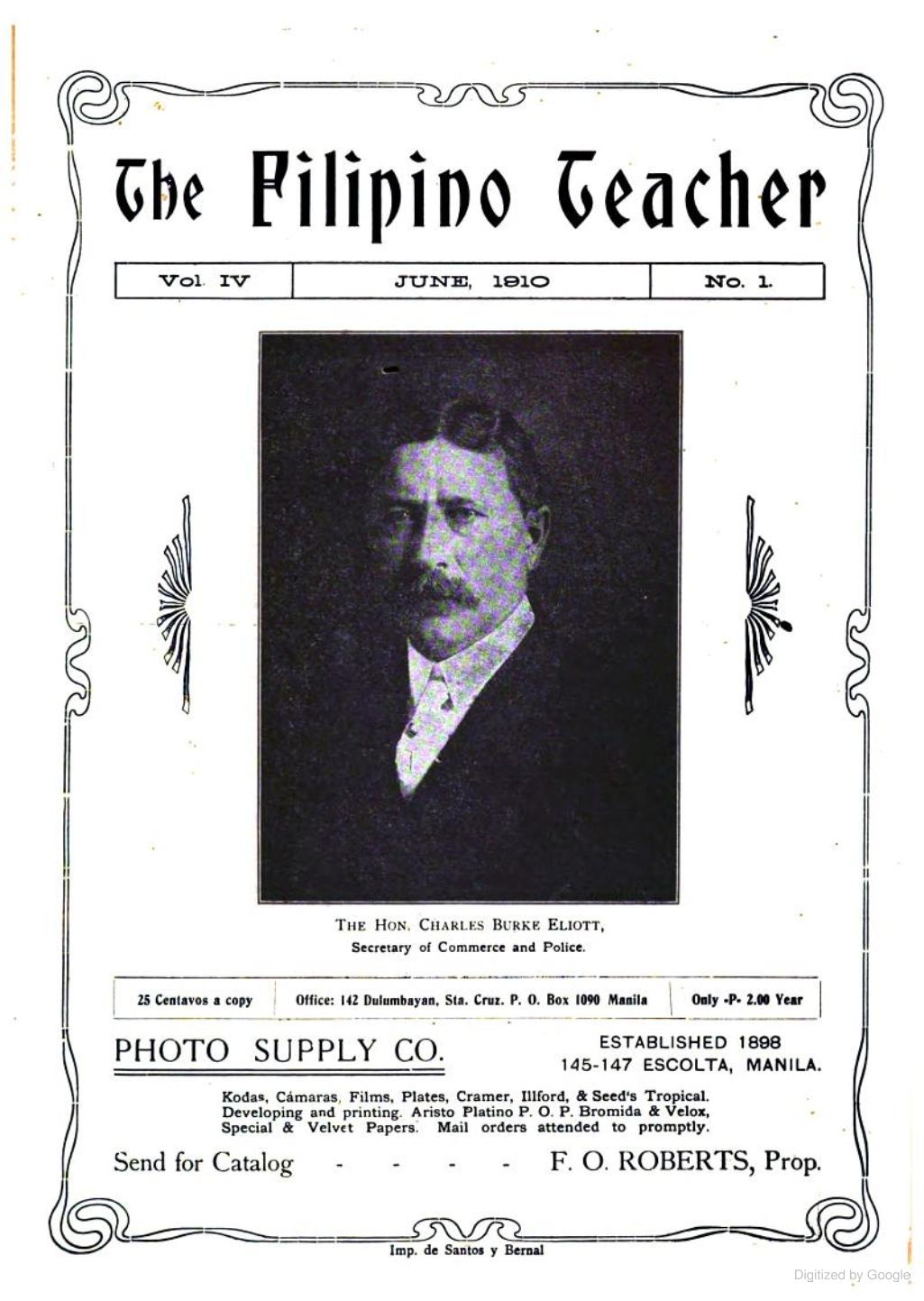
Elliott as Philippine Secretary of Commerce and Police, from The Filipino Teacher dated June 1910

Born in Morgan County, Ohio, Elliott moved to Iowa with his parents. He graduated from University of Iowa College of Law in 1881 and was admitted to the Iowa bar. He was the lawyer for a land company in Aberdeen, Dakota Territory. Elliott then moved to Minnesota in 1884. He received his doctorate from University of Minnesota in 1887 with a thesis on "The Northeastern Fisheries" and taught at the university from 1890 to 1899. In 1890, Elliott was appointed the Minneapolis, Minnesota municipal court judge and in 1894 was appointed a Minnesota district court judge. During the Spanish–American War, Elliott was adjutant general of the State of Minnesota. Elliott was a Republican. From 1905 to 1909, Elliott served on the Minnesota Supreme Court. In 1909, President William H. Taft appointed Elliott to the Supreme Court of the Philippines over which Elliott served for two years. He was then appointed Philippine Secretary of Commerce and Police and served until 1912. He then resumed his law practice in Minneapolis. He also wrote several books about the law and the government of the Philippine Islands. He died in Minneapolis, Minnesota after being in ill health.
