= Clinton L. Riggs =

American businessman and government official

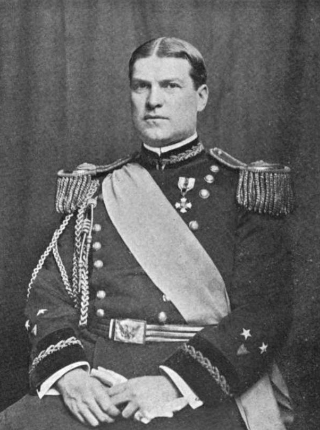

Biographical details
- Born: September 13, 1865; New York, New York, U.S.
- Died: September 12, 1938 (aged 72); Baltimore, Maryland U.S.

Playing career
- 1887: Princeton

Coaching career (HC unless noted)
- 1888: Johns Hopkins

Head coaching record
- Overall: 1–1

Clinton Levering Riggs (September 13, 1865 – September 12, 1938) was an American businessman, government official, military officer, and lacrosse coach. He served as the Adjutant-General of the Maryland National Guard and the Secretary of Commerce and Police of the Philippine Commission from 1913 to 1915. Riggs was also the second head coach of the lacrosse team at Johns Hopkins University.

== Early life and college ==
Riggs was born in New York City on September 13, 1865, to merchant and manufacturer Lawrason and Mary Turpin (née Bright) Riggs. His family moved to Baltimore, Maryland, the year after his birth in 1866. During his childhood, he spent his summers in Narragansett Pier, Rhode Island, and attended the St. Paul's School in Concord, New Hampshire.

Riggs then attended college at Princeton University, where he played on the lacrosse team. He graduated in 1887 with a degree in civil engineering. In 1888, he began postgraduate work at Johns Hopkins University where he also coached the lacrosse team. Hopkins lost their first game to the Druid Lacrosse Club, 4–1, but then captured the first victory in school history against the Patterson Lacrosse Club of Baltimore, 6–2.

== Professional career ==
After concluding his postgraduate studies in 1889, he moved to Iowa to work as an engineer. Riggs then became a cattle rancher before returning to Baltimore to become a machinist apprentice with the Robert Poole & Son Company. On October 12, 1891, he became vice president of the Detrick & Harvey Machine Company, a position he held until his retirement on December 31, 1920.

He served in the Fifth Regiment of the Maryland state militia, beginning as a second lieutenant of Company E on April 29, 1890. He was promoted to captain and took command of Company F on November 12, 1895. He later attained the rank of major, and was mustered for the Spanish–American War on May 14, 1898, as part of the United States Volunteers. The New York Times reported that "he was in such disfavor with the then Col. Coale and most of the other officers of the regiment that he resigned as soon as the regiment was mustered out of service." In January 1904, Riggs was named Adjutant-General of the Maryland National Guard by Governor Edwin Warfield. The appointment was not received favorably by his fellow officers of the regiment, as The New York Times noted, he assumed "command of all the officers who induced" his earlier resignation. Riggs served in that position for four years.

In 1913, President Woodrow Wilson appointed General Riggs to the Philippine Commission. As Secretary of Commerce and Police, Riggs clashed with Governor General Francis Burton Harrison about who had authority over the Philippine Constabulary. In November 1914, Harrison cabled Washington to request the dismissal of Riggs from his post on the commission.

In February 1928, while living in Catonsville, Maryland, Riggs served as chairman of the Wood Memorial Fund, which sought to raise $2 million to eradicate leprosy in the Philippines. Riggs did business in real estate and served as the head of the Baltimore real estate board. He was also involved in swine breeding.

== Personal life ==
On October 23, 1894, he married Mary Kennedy née Cromwell. Riggs was a member of the Baltimore Club, the Bachelors' Cotillon Club, Municipal Art Society, and served as chairman of the house committee of the Baltimore Athletic Club. He enjoyed playing lawn tennis, football, and lacrosse. Riggs was described as "a lifetime Democrat in his political conviction", but voted against presidential candidate William Jennings Bryan because of his stance on the silver issue.

Riggs died of a heart condition on September 12, 1938, at Union Memorial Hospital in Baltimore, Maryland.
