= San Juan de Dios Educational Foundation =

Private college and hospital in Pasay, Philippines

San Juan de Dios Educational Foundation, Inc.
- Official seal
- Other names: San Juan de Dios Hospital; San Juan de Dios College
- Former names: Hospital de San Juan de Dios (hospital); San Juan de Dios Nursing School (college)
- Motto: Servire In Caritatem
- Motto in English: "Serve in Love"
- Type: Privately held company
- Established: June 24, 1578; 448 years ago
- President: Sr. Josie B. Onag, DC (College)
- Students: over 300
- Location: 2772–2774 EDSA corner Roxas Boulevard, Pasay 1300, Pasay, Metro Manila, Philippines; 14°32′19″N 120°59′36″E
- Campus: Urban
- Hymn: SJDEFI College Hymn
- Nickname: SJDicians
- Website: sanjuandedios.org (hospital); sjefi.edu.ph (college)
- Location in Metro Manila Location in Luzon Location in the Philippines

San Juan de Dios Educational Foundation, Inc. (SJDEFI or SJ, formerly Hospital de San Juan de Dios) is a private, non-stock, non-profit, joint institute of education and tertiary health sciences operating as a college and a hospital in Pasay, Philippines. Both the colleges and hospital are run by the Daughters of Charity. It started out as a hospital in 1578. The hospital is considered the oldest hospital in the Philippines. It is named after San Juan de Dios, a Portuguese-born soldier that turned health-care worker of Spain.

Throughout the years, the school has received accreditation from organizations such as the Commission on Higher Education (CHEd), the Department of Education (DepEd). It has also become a member of the Catholic Educational Association of the Philippines (CEAP).

== History ==
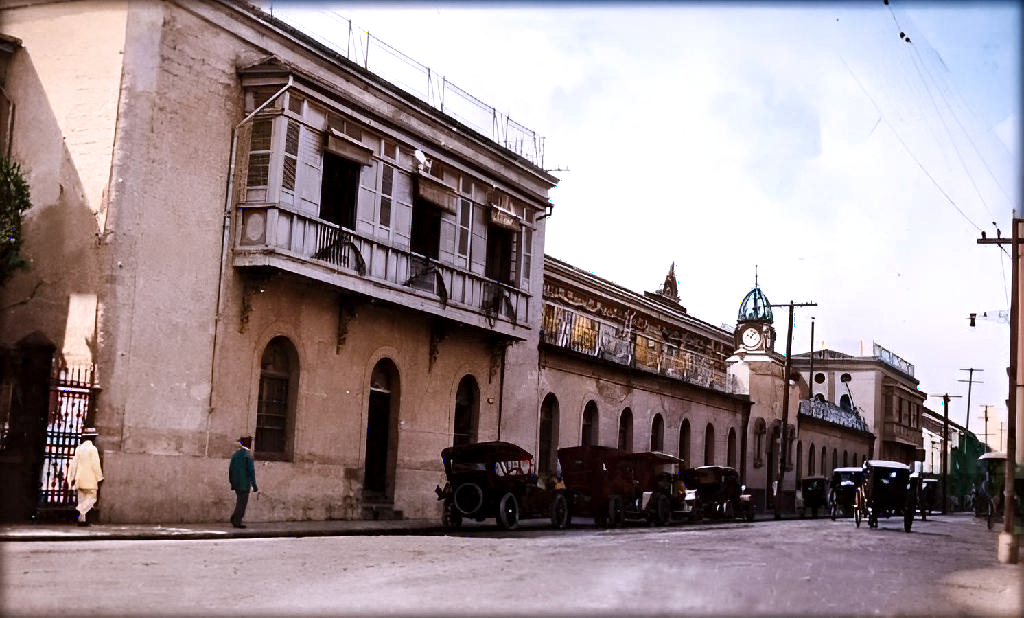
Old Hospital de San Juan de Dios inside the walled city of Manila. circa early 1900's

The present college of San Juan de Dios Educational Foundation, Inc. (SJDEFI) was founded on the ideals of nursing and health care, which were pioneered in the Philippines by the Order of Friars Minor in 1578. The missionary nursing-like activities were continued by the Daughters of Charity when administration of the Hospital de San Juan de Dios was passed on to them in 1868.

In 1913, Hospital de San Juan de Dios opened the first nursing school in the country because of the need to open a school of nursing that will scientifically train students in technical nursing service. With the opening of the Bachelor of Science in Medical Technology course in 1965, a Liberal Arts course was also opened in the same year. This laid the foundation for the conversion of the school into a College in 1973. 60 years after, it was converted into San Juan de Dios College. The course Medical Technology was also added to the list of program offerings.

On December 12, 1953, the Hospital and College were relocated to Dewey Boulevard (now Roxas Boulevard) after the original hospital location was converted into Lyceum of the Philippines University in Intramuros.

On April 17, 1991, the San Juan de Dios Hospital and College became an educational foundation. It was also during this period when the college began a new baccalaureate course, Bachelor of Science in Physical Therapy.

The College of Nursing applied for and received its Level 1 accreditation from the Philippine Accrediting Association of Schools, Colleges and Universities (PAASCU) in 2003.

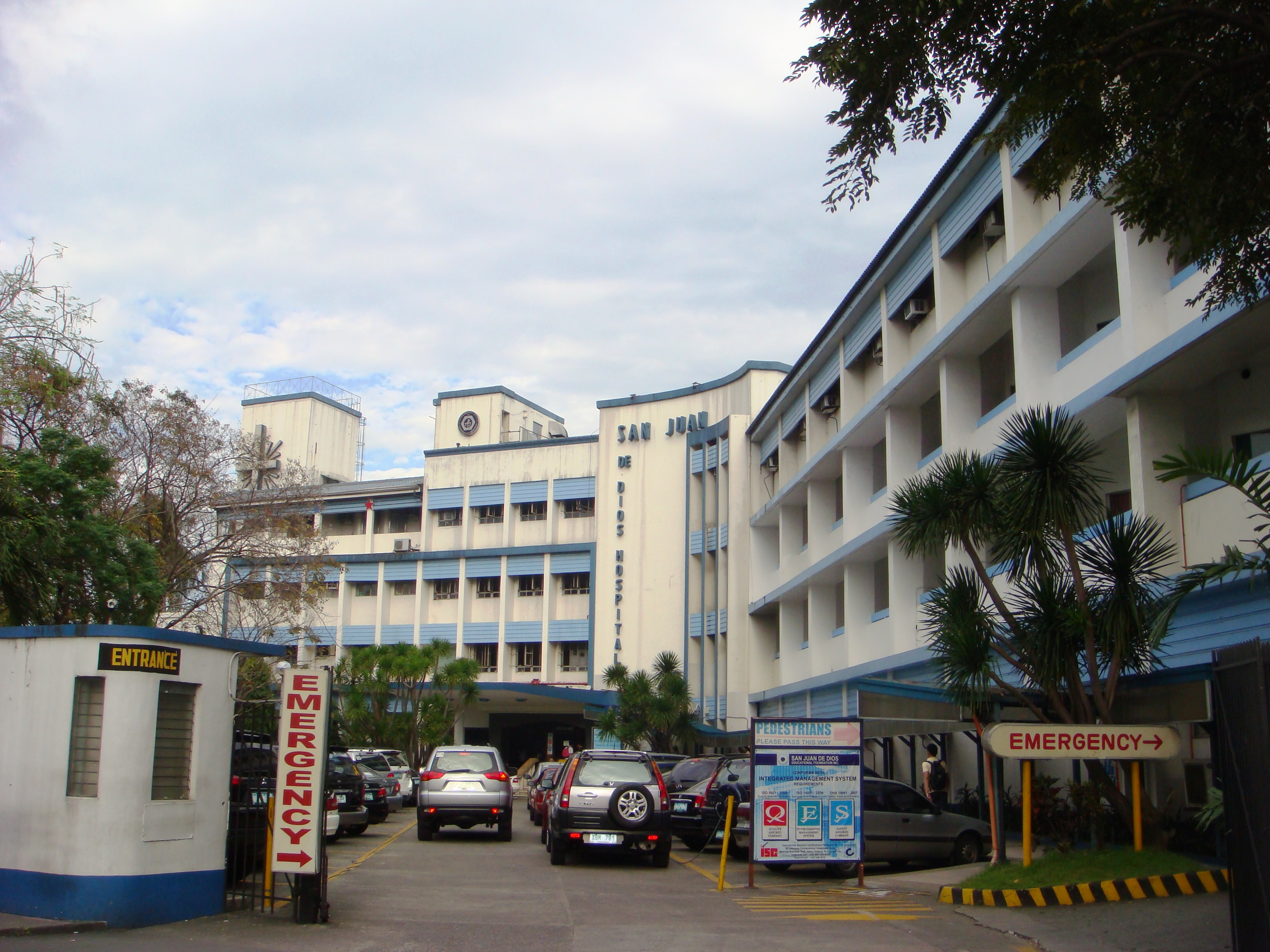
The Hospital entrance along Roxas Boulevard in 2012

In 2016, San Juan de Dios College opened its Senior High School (Grades 11 and 12) program with strands Accountancy, Business and Management (ABM), General Academic Strand (GAS), Humanities and Social Sciences (HUMSS), Science, Technology, Engineering and Mathematics (STEM) and Technological and Vocational Livelihood (TVL).

In 2019, San Juan de Dios College introduced 2 new business courses, Bachelor of Science in Entrepreneurship and Bachelor of Science in Office Administration. On the same year, the General Academic Strand (GAS) was discontinued permanently due to huge number of classrooms.

In May 2020, San Juan de Dios College temporarily discontinued their entrance examinations due to the COVID-19 pandemic. However, they resumed on April 13, 2024.

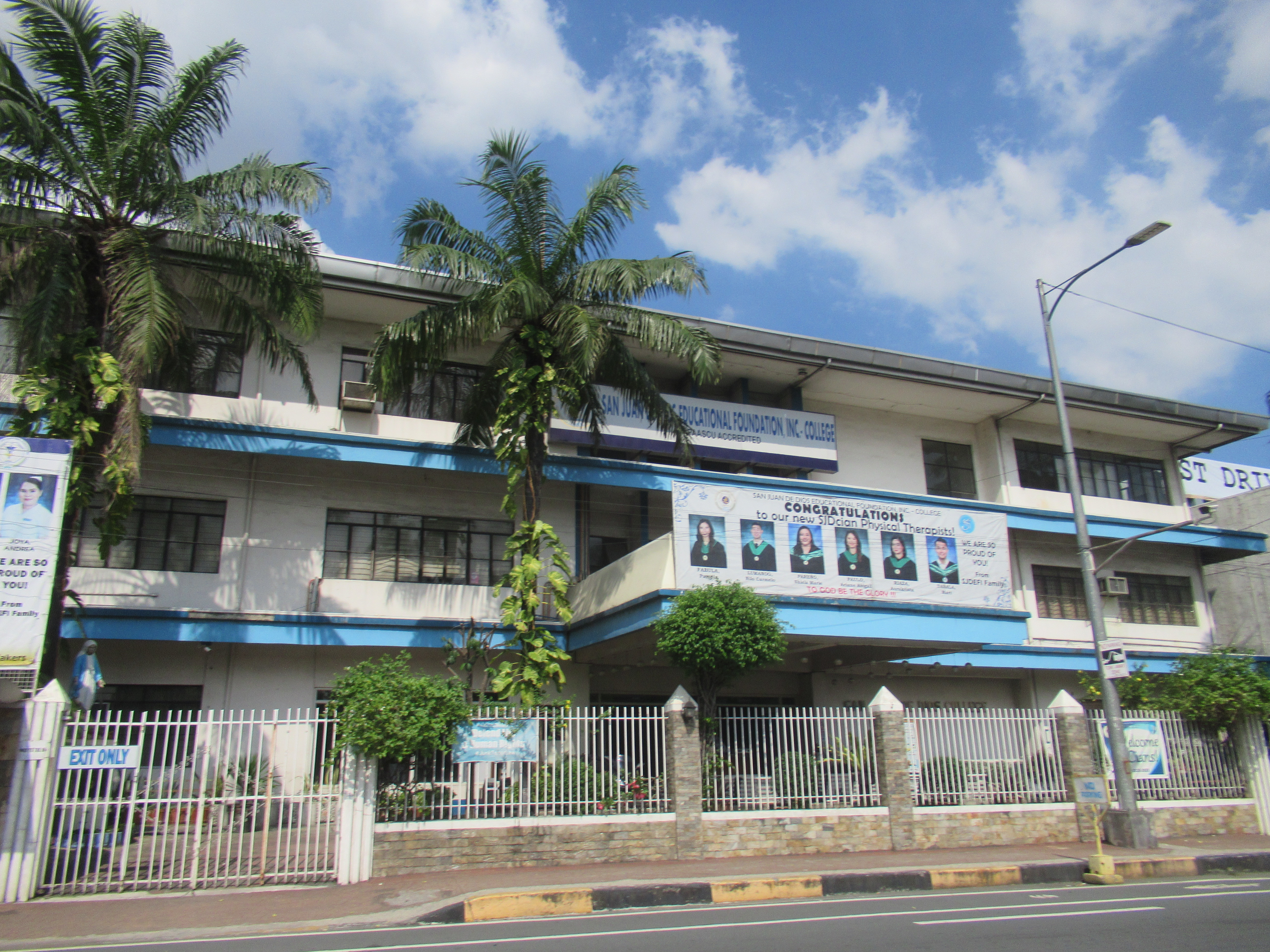
The College in April 2023
