= Winfred Thaxter Denison =

American lawyer (1873–1919)

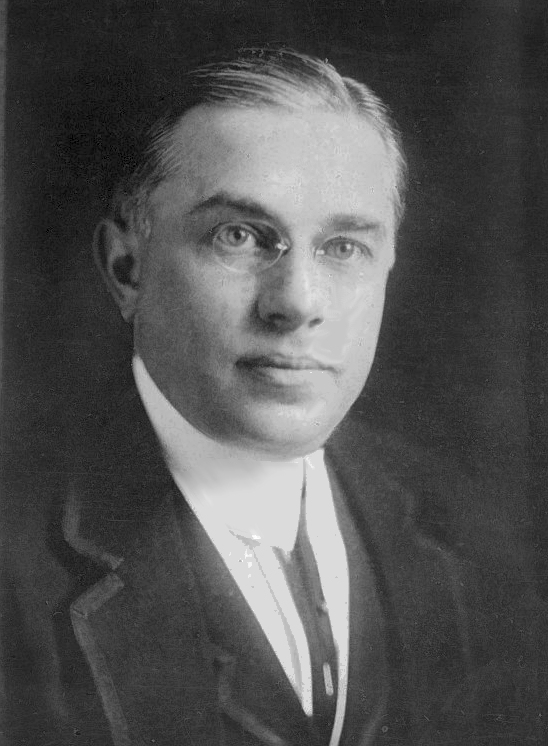

Philippine Secretary of the Interior
- In office January 27, 1914 – March 3, 1916
- Appointed by: Francis Burton Harrison
- Preceded by: Dean Worcester
- Succeeded by: Rafael Palma

Personal details
- Born: June 30, 1873 Portland, Maine, U.S.
- Died: November 5, 1919 (aged 46) Manhattan, New York City, U.S.
- Education: Harvard University

Winfred Thaxter Denison (June 30, 1873 – November 5, 1919) was the United States Assistant Attorney General and Secretary of the Interior for the Philippines from 1914 to 1916.

== Biography ==
He was born in Portland, Maine on June 30, 1873. He attended Harvard University and was editor-in-chief of the literary magazine, The Harvard Monthly. Despondent because of ill health he died by suicide when he jumped in front of a subway train at Pennsylvania Station in Manhattan, New York City on November 5, 1919.
