= Members of the 111th United States Congress =

The 111th United States Congress, in session from 2009 to 2010, consisted of 541 elected officials from 50 states, five territories, and the District of Columbia. It is the federal legislature of the United States of America, continuing an unbroken chain dating back to the 1st Congress in 1789.

The Senate has 100 members; the House of Representatives has 435 members and six non-voting delegates.

== Demographics ==
In the Senate, there were 17 women: Barbara Boxer (D-CA), Maria Cantwell (D-WA), Susan Collins (R-ME), Kay Hagan (D-NC), Dianne Feinstein (D-CA), Kirsten Gillibrand (D-NY), Kay Bailey Hutchison (R-TX), Amy Klobuchar (D-MN), Mary Landrieu (D-LA), Blanche Lincoln (D-AR), Claire McCaskill (D-MO), Barbara Mikulski (D-MD), Lisa Murkowski (R-AK), Patty Murray (D-WA), Jeanne Shaheen (D-NH), Olympia Snowe (R-ME), and Debbie Stabenow (D-MI).

There were 13 Jewish Americans, 2 Cuban Americans (Bob Menendez, D-NJ and Ted Cruz, R-TX), 1 Native Hawaiian (Daniel Akaka, D-HI) and 1 African American, Roland Burris (D-IL). The average age of senators in 2007 was 62 years. The oldest senator was Frank Lautenberg (D-NJ), born January 23, 1924. The youngest senator was Carte Goodwin (D-WV), born February 27, 1974. The median age of all Americans was 38 years.

=== Religious demographics ===
Religious Affiliations of Members of Congress
Religion	Percent
Protestant	54.7%
Catholic	30.1%
Jewish	8.4%
Latter-day Saint	2.6%
Eastern Orthodox	1.3%
Unknown	0.9%
Other Christian	0.6%
Other Faiths	0.6%
Muslim	0.4%
Buddhist	0.4%

The top five religious affiliations in the 111th Congress were Roman Catholic (30.1%), Baptist (12.4%), Methodist (10.7%), Jewish (8.4%), and Presbyterian (8.1%). Protestant denominations have held a large majority throughout congressional history, reflecting American's traditional demographics. In the 111th Congress, 54.7% of seats were held by members of Protestant denominations.

45 Jews served in the 111th Congress. Eleven representatives and six senators were Mormons. Senator Olympia Snowe, as well as Representatives John Sarbanes, Zack Space, Gus Bilirakis, Dina Titus, Niki Tsongas and Melissa Bean are Eastern Orthodox Christians.

In 2007, Keith Ellison of Minnesota became the first practicing Muslim to become a member of the United States Congress. He was joined by André Carson of Indiana following a special election on March 11, 2008. Mazie Hirono of Hawaii and Hank Johnson of Georgia became the first 2 Buddhists to be elected to the United States Congress on November 7, 2006. Johnson is a member of the Soka Gakkai movement and Hirono is a member of the Jodo Shinshu sect, although she is non-practicing. Both are Japanese Buddhist oriented.

Senator Kent Conrad (D-N.D.) and Representatives Walt Minnick (D-Idaho) and Pete Stark (D-CA) were the only Unitarian Universalists that served in the 111th Congress. In a response to a March 2007 survey from the Secular Coalition for America, Rep. Pete Stark became the only open atheist in the history of Congress. 1 member of the 111th Congress was a Quaker, Representative Rush Holt (D-NJ).

Nine members of the 111th Congress were categorized Not Given / Unspecified / Unavailable / Don't Know.

Hawaii was the only state that held a majority non-Christian House delegation; both representatives Mazie Hirono and Colleen Hanabusa are Buddhists.

=== Sexual orientation ===
There were six openly lesbian, gay, or bisexual members in the history of Congress. Gerry Studds (elected in 1972) became the first openly gay man to serve in congress when he publicly announced his sexuality in 1982. Barney Frank (serving since 1981) first spoke publicly about his sexual orientation in 1987. Steve Gunderson, elected in 1980 and outed in 1994, and Jim Kolbe, elected in 1984 and outed in 1996, are 2 other previous members of Congress who were openly gay. Current Senator Tammy Baldwin is the first and so far the only open lesbian to win election to Congress. In 1998, she became the first ever openly gay person to win election to Congress as a non-incumbent. She went on to become the first openly gay person to win election to the U.S. Senate in 2012. Former California representative Michael Huffington is bisexual, but did not come out until after his term had ended. Jared Polis (who was elected in 2008 and assumed office on January 6, 2009) is the first openly gay man to have been elected to the House as a freshman. Republican representative Mark Foley's homosexuality was well known in his district, though he did not serve openly in Congress and did not come out publicly until after his term ended.

=== Occupational background ===
Members of the 111th Congress come from a variety of occupational backgrounds. As of the start of the 111th Congress, members of Congress include:

- 269 members (227 Representatives, 2 Delegates, and 40 Senators) served in state or territorial legislatures
- 214 members (182 Representatives and 33 Senators) list their occupation as public service/politics
- 225 (168 Representatives and 57 Senators) list law
- 201 (175 Representatives and 27 Senators) list business
- 94 (78 Representatives and 16 Senators) list education
- At least 112 members of the 111th Congress were former congressional staffers, including nine congressional pages.
  - Thirteen have served as White House staffers or White House Fellows, and several have served as executive branch employees
- 38 members have been mayors
  - (Sens. Mark Begich, Bob Corker, Mike Enzi, Dianne Feinstein, Jim Inhofe, Mike Johanns, Richard Lugar, Bob Menendez, Bernie Sanders, George Voinovich, Reps. Brian Bilbray, Bobby Bright, Judy Chu, Mike Capuano, Emanuel Cleaver, Lincoln Davis, Marcia Fudge, Elton Gallegly, Kay Granger, Dennis Kucinich, Kenny Marchant, Jim Marshall, Howard McKeon, Gary Miller, Harry Mitchell, Jim Moran, Sue Myrick, Grace Napolitano, Richard Neal, Bill Pascrell, Phil Roe, Steve Rothman, Albio Sires, Bennie Thompson, Mike Turner, Rob Wittman, Don Young), 13 state governors (Sens. Lamar Alexander, Mark Warner, Evan Bayh, Judd Gregg, Jay Rockefeller, Jeanne Shaheen, Kit Bond, George Voinovich, Mike Johanns, Ben Nelson, Tom Carper, Jim Risch, and Rep. Michael Castle), eleven lieutenant governors (including 2 delegates: Sens. John Kerry, Harry Reid, Jim Risch, George Voinovich, Reps. Michael Castle, Mary Fallin, John Garamendi, Mazie Hirono, Denny Rehberg, Dels. Madeleine Bordallo and Eni Faleomavaega), 1 state first lady (Olympia Snowe was first lady of Maine while she was a Congresswoman), and 1 territorial first lady (Del. Madeleine Bordallo);
- 24 members were health care professionals
  - Of the 24, 16 were medical doctors (14 Representatives and 2 Senators: family medicine specialists Rep. Vic Snyder, John C. Fleming, Paul Broun, and Del. Donna Christian-Christensen; psychiatrist Rep. Jim McDermott; ob/gyns Sen. Tom Coburn and Reps. Michael C. Burgess, Ron Paul, Phil Roe, and Phil Gingrey; allergist Rep. Steve Kagen; hepatologist/gastroenterologist Rep. Bill Cassidy; heart surgeon Rep. Charles Boustany; radiation oncologist Rep. Parker Griffith; orthopedic surgeons Sen. John Barrasso and Rep. Tom Price). Of the 16, 12 represent districts or states in the South (three are from Louisiana); 12 are Republicans and four are Democrats.
  - Three nurses (Reps. Carolyn McCarthy, Lois Capps, and Eddie Bernice Johnson)
  - 2 dentists (Reps. John Linder and Mike Simpson)
  - 2 veterinarians (Rep. Kurt Schrader and Sen. John Ensign)
  - 1 psychologist (Rep. Brian Baird), an optometrist (Rep. John Boozman), a clinical dietician (Rep. Kathy Dahlkemper), and a pharmacist (Rep. Robert Marion Berry);
- Nine members were involved with agriculture:
  - Three organic farmers (including Sen. Jon Tester and Rep. Mike Thompson),
  - Three ranchers,
  - 2 vintners (Reps. George Radanovich and Mike Thompson),
  - 1 fruit orchard worker;
- Seven members were involved in music, film, or sports, including 2 professional musicians and a semi-professional musician, a screenwriter, a documentary filmmaker, as well as a Baseball Hall of Fame pitcher (Sen. Jim Bunning) and a National Football League quarterback (Rep. Heath Shuler).
- Five members are engineers (including Reps. Joe Barton, Cliff Stearns, Pete Stark).
- Six members are scientists: three physicists (Reps. Rush Holt, Bill Foster, and Vern Ehlers), a chemist (Rep. Ed Pastor), a microbiologist (Rep. Louise Slaughter), and a physiologist (Rep. Roscoe Bartlett).
- Six members are former automobile dealers.
- Six members worked in media: 1 radio talk show host, 1 radio/television broadcaster, 1 radio broadcaster, 1 newscaster, 1 television reporter, and 1 television commentator
- Five members are former Peace Corps volunteers (Sen. Chris Dodd and Reps. Mike Honda, Sam Farr, Tom Petri, and Steve Driehaus)
- Five members are former accountants (Rep. Mike Conaway)
- Four members are ministers
- Four members were sheriffs (Rep. Dave Reichert), 1 a deputy sheriff, four police officers (including a Capitol policeman), 2 state troopers (Rep. Kendrick Meek of the Florida Highway Patrol and Rep. Bart Stupak of the Michigan State Police), 2 probation officers, 1 FBI special agent, 1 Border Patrol chief, and 1 volunteer firefighter
- 2 members have served as members of the Cabinet (Sens. Lamar Alexander and Mike Johanns), three served as state supreme court justices (Rep. Lloyd Doggett, Sen. John Cornyn), and 1 each was Secretary of the Navy (Sen. Jim Webb), a United States Navy vice admiral, a Deputy Assistant Secretary of State, a Department of Defense counterterrorism consultant, an ambassador, and a federal judge (Alcee Hastings)
- 1 member served as a parliamentary aide in the British House of Commons and 1 served as a Foreign Service Officer.
- 1 member has been an astronaut, 1 a naval aviator, 1 a commander of a carrier battle group (Rep. Joe Sestak, a retired vice admiral and the highest-ranking former serviceman in Congress), 2 were instructors at West Point (Rep. Patrick Murphy) and (Rep. Thomas Rooney), and 1 a pilot of Marine One, the presidential helicopter
- Many members have other professions: There were three carpenters, 2 bank tellers, a driving instructor, a cosmetics saleswoman, a mountain guide, a ski instructor; a casino dealer, a night watchman, a prison guard, a furniture salesman, an ironworker (Rep. Stephen Lynch), an autoworker, a clothing factory worker, a textile worker, an oilfield worker, a mortician, a coroner, a waitress (Rep. Shelley Berkley), a Teamster and dairy worker, a paper mill worker (Rep. Mike Michaud), a cement plant worker (Rep. Maurice Hinchey), a meat cutter (Sen. Robert Byrd), a shellfish specialist (Rep. Rob Wittman), a tugboat captain (Rep. Don Young), a taxicab driver, an auctioneer, a toll booth collector, and a hotel clerk.

=== Military service ===
Some members of the 111th Congress had served in the United States armed forces; some are combat veterans. There were 167 veterans in the 107th Congress, 153 in the 108th Congress, 126 in the 110th Congress, and 121 in the 111th Congress. Some were still serving as reservists during their tenure.

On December 17, 2012, Senators Frank Lautenberg and Daniel Akaka became the last remaining World War II veterans in the Senate after Senator Daniel Inouye died of respiratory complications. Representatives Ralph Hall and John Dingell were the final remaining WWII veterans in the House of Representatives, though Representative Hall lost his 2014 primary battle and Dean of the House Dingell retired at the end of that same congress. On January 3, 2013, Senator Lautenberg was the final remaining WWII veteran serving in the senate until his untimely death on June 3, 2013.

Sen. Jim Webb (D-VA), a Marine Corps veteran, served in Vietnam as platoon commander with Delta Company, 1st Battalion 5th Marines; he earned a Navy Cross, Silver Star, 2 Bronze Stars, and 2 Purple Hearts. Sen. John McCain (R-AZ) served in Vietnam as a naval aviator. Shot down during his 23rd bombing mission over Vietnam in 1967, McCain was captured and tortured as a prisoner of war and was finally released in March 1973. He earned the Silver Star, Bronze Star, Purple Heart, Distinguished Flying Cross, Navy Commendation Medal and the Prisoner of War Medal, though it was created years after his release.

=== Race/ethnicity ===
==== African Americans ====
African Americans currently make up about 13% of the US population, but have historically been underrepresented in Congress. In the 111th Congress, 42 members (9.5%) of the House were African American. As of 2010, there was 1 African-American serving in the Senate. Roland Burris was sworn in as senator on January 15, 2009, after being appointed by Illinois Governor Rod Blagojevich. Following the end of Burris's tenure in the Senate and his replacement by Republican Mark Kirk on November 29, 2010, there were once again no African Americans serving in the Senate. Barack Obama previously held Burris's seat but resigned from his position on November 16, 2008, after winning the presidential election of 2008 and becoming the first African American to be elected President of the United States. Until the emancipation of enslaved African Americans after the Civil War and the passage of the Civil Rights Act of 1866, blacks were generally barred from voting outside of the Northeast. As a result of these new laws, Joseph Rainey and Jefferson F. Long won election to Congress in majority-black districts and Hiram Rhodes Revels was appointed as senator from Mississippi (then a majority-black state) in 1870. However, the end of Reconstruction in 1876 marked a weakening of black rights and by 1901, when George Henry White left the House after losing a reelection bid, there were no African Americans left in Congress.

In 1929, Oscar Stanton de Priest became the first African American congressman since White. He and his successor, Arthur W. Mitchell, spent their tenure as the only African Americans in Congress while representing a majority-black House district in Chicago. Not until the election of Adam Clayton Powell Jr. of New York City's Harlem did Congress feature 2 African Americans serving at the same time in the modern era. The Voting Rights Act of 1965, which strengthened black voting rights, increased the position of black office-seekers. Shirley Chisholm became the first African American female member of Congress when she won a 1968 election in New York, while Andrew Young of Georgia became the first modern African American congressman from the South after he won election in 1972. In 1970, a year that saw the election of four black freshman congressman, black membership in the House reached double-digits.

Only eight African Americans have served in the U.S. Senate. Hiram Revels and Blanche Bruce both served during Reconstruction in then majority-black Mississippi. Popularly elected black senators are Edward Brooke (served 1967–79), Carol Moseley Braun (served 1993–99 as the first black female senator), Barack Obama (served 2005–08), and Cory Booker (2013-). Roland Burris (served 2008–2010) was appointed to finish the term of then-president-elect Obama, and Tim Scott was appointed in January 2013 to finish the term of Jim DeMint, who left the Senate to head the Heritage Foundation. Brooke served in Massachusetts, while Braun, Obama, and Burris each held the same Illinois seat. Scott serves from South Carolina and was the first African-American U.S. senator from the South since Reconstruction. Booker won a special election in October 2013 and was the first African-American senator from New Jersey. He was elected to finish the term of the late Frank Lautenberg, who died in June 2013. Both Scott and Booker face reelection in 2014 and, should they run and win, would become the first elected African-American U.S. senators to serve in the chamber concurrently.

==== Hispanic Americans ====
Representation of Hispanics is somewhat complex; particularly, because of the different ways to define membership in this group. Hispanics represent over 14% of the U.S. population, while the Senate was 3% Hispanic and the House was approximately 5% (25 members) Hispanic. Considering that Hispanics make up only 4% of American voters, Hispanic political incorporation has been relatively high compared with previous immigrant groups. The Congressional Hispanic Caucus has 21 members. José Manuel Gallegos, a Mexican American, was the first Hispanic in Congress. He was the first delegate to the US Congress from the Territory of New Mexico. The first to represent a state was Romualdo Pacheco, a Mexican American, who represented California in 1877. In 1929, Octaviano Ambrosio Larrazolo of New Mexico became the first Hispanic to be elected to the United States Senate. Ileana Ros-Lehtinen, a Cuban American first elected in 1989, was the first Hispanic woman in Congress. While Hispanic women have served in House, none have been elected to the Senate.

Unlike black Americans, Hispanics never were legally barred from the polls, and in New Mexico and California, they were a large and influential minority. Since the election of Dennis Chavez and Joachim O. Fernández to the House in 1931, Hispanics have continuously been represented in Congress. Most Hispanic members of Congress, including all elected prior to 1970, were of Mexican descent with the exception of Herman Badillo, who won election in 1970, becoming the first Puerto Rican from a mainland state in Congress. Ileana Ros-Lehtinen was elected in 1989 as the first Cuban American congresswoman.

Prior to 2005, only three Hispanics have won a term in the U.S. Senate. These members were Octaviano Larrazola (served 1928–29), Dennis Chavez (formerly of the House, and served 1935–62), and Joseph Montoya (also formerly a House member, served 1964–77), all of Mexican descent. However, 2 Hispanics won Senate seats in 2004, Ken Salazar and Mel Martinez (the first Cuban American senator). As of the 113th Congress, there are three Hispanics in the US Senate: Bob Menendez, a Democrat from New Jersey; Marco Rubio, a Republican from Florida; and Ted Cruz, Republican of Texas. They are all Cuban-American.

==== Asian Americans and Pacific Islanders ====
Asian Americans and Pacific Islanders have a high level of political incorporation in terms of their actual voting population. However, as a result of this group's historically low voting rates, overall political incorporation of the general population was relatively low. The population of this group has increased in size by 600% in the last 30 years due to immigration. Despite high levels of naturalization and voter outreach efforts, this primarily foreign-born community with less than 1% of voters has 2% of congressional population. As 4.4% of the total population in the United States falls into this category, this 2% still represents less than half of the total Asian American and Pacific Islander population.

There were eight members of Asian or Islander descent in the House and three in the Senate. Senator Daniel Inouye and Representatives Mike Honda, Doris Matsui, and Mazie Hirono are all Japanese Americans. Senator Daniel Akaka is a Native Hawaiian, Delegate Eni Faleomavaega is a Samoan, and Joseph Cao is a Vietnamese American. Bobby Scott of Virginia, who is also half African American, has Filipino American ancestry. Steve Austria of Ohio also claims Filipino American ethnicity. John Ensign of Nevada has claimed that he is 1/8 Filipino American, enlarging the number of those who claim to be Filipino American in Congress to the highest point since the Philippine Islands had been represented as a territory. Judy Chu became the first Chinese American woman in Congress when she won a special election in 2009. David Wu of Oregon is Taiwanese American.

Robert William Wilcox, a Native Hawaiian who served as Hawaiian territorial delegate from 1900 to 1903, was the first Pacific Islander chosen to serve in Congress. Benito Legarda y Tuason and Pablo Ocampo joined the House in 1907 as Resident Commissioners, becoming the first Asian Americans to serve in the Congress, and beginning the representation of the Philippines which ended in 1947. Dalip Singh Saund (served 1957–63) was the first South Asian American in Congress and was one of only two Indian Americans to be elected to the legislature. Hiram Fong, who served three decades in the Senate from 1959 to 1977, is the first and one of only two Chinese American members to have entered Congress. Daniel Inouye (serving since 1959) was the first Japanese American in the House and later the first in Senate. Patsy Mink (served 1965–77 and again from 1990 to 2002) was the first Asian American woman in Congress. Bobby Scott, elected in 1993, was the first US born member of Congress to have Filipino ancestry. David Wu, elected in 1998, was the only person of Taiwanese ancestry to serve in Congress at the time, while in 2009, Joseph Cao became the first Vietnamese American in the legislature.

Only five members of the U.S. Senate have ever been of Asian American or Pacific Islander backgrounds. Four of these politicians have been from Hawaii.

==== Native Americans ====
Compared with the European American, African American, Latino, and Asian/Pacific American communities, American Indians, who comprise 1.5% of the population, are the most underrepresented group. Tom Cole, a Chickasaw, and Markwayne Mullin, a Cherokee, are the only registered American Indians currently in Congress. Tracking Native American members of Congress is complex, since many people of mixed blood are not registered as part of the American Indian population. Charles Curtis, who was three-eighths Native American and had ancestry from a variety of different tribes, was elected in 1892 as the first U.S. representative from this group. Curtis accomplished several other firsts during his political tenure. He became the first American Indian to serve in the US Senate (in office 1907–13 and 1915–29), to lead a major party (served as Republican Senate Majority Leader from 1925 to 1929), and to obtain the office of Vice President.

Several of the nation's major tribes have been represented in Congress in limited number. Charles David Carter (served 1907–27) was the first Chickasaw in Congress; William Wirt Hastings (served 1915–35) was the first Cherokee in the legislature; Ben Reifel (served 1961–71) was the first Sioux to win election to the body. Other than Curtis, only a few members of the U.S. Senate have been American Indians. Robert Latham Owen (served 1907–25) and Ben Nighthorse Campbell (served 1993–2005 after several previous terms in the House and the first Cheyenne in Congress) are the others to have earned that distinction.

==== Middle Eastern Americans ====
Middle Eastern Americans also have typically low levels of voting incorporation; except, among a particular voting group. As a group, Middle Eastern Americans are not measured by the U.S. census, which, combined with differences in the definition of this group, makes measuring its percentage of the population difficult. Estimates place about 1.8% of the nation's population to be of this origin. Nearly all Middle Eastern members of Congress have been Lebanese Americans. George Kasem became the first Lebanese congressman when he won his first and only term in 1958. Since Abraham Kazen took office in 1967, serving until 1985, Lebanese Americans have consistently served in Congress. There are currently 2 Lebanese members of the House: Charles Boustany, and Darrell Issa.

Five members of the U.S. Senate have been of Middle Eastern descent, all five with Arab American ancestry and four of Lebanese descent. James Abourezk, who served from 1973 to 1979, became the first Lebanese American Senator. George Mitchell (served 1980–95), who is half Lebanese, became the first Middle Eastern American party leader, as he served as Senate Majority Leader from 1989 to 1995. James Abdnor (served 1981–87) and Spencer Abraham (served 1995–2001) also were Lebanese American senators, while John Sununu was the only person of Palestinian ancestry to serve in Congress. Member of Congress Anna Eshoo is also of Middle Eastern descent, she is an Assyrian.

==== Foreign-born Americans ====
Two Senators were born overseas to U.S. citizen parents, John McCain of Arizona and Michael Bennet of Colorado, (who were born in the Panama Canal Zone and India, respectively. Senator Ted Cruz (Texas) was born in Canada to a Cuban (U.S. permanent resident) father and a native-born American mother.

There were eight current Representatives who were born overseas—Lincoln Diaz-Balart, Ileana Ros-Lehtinen, and Albio Sires from Cuba; Mazie Hirono from Japan; Ciro Rodriguez from Mexico; Pete Hoekstra from the Netherlands; and David Wu from Taiwan. Foreign-born Congresspersons comprised 2% of the voting membership of the House. This figure does not include four members who were born overseas to U.S. citizen parents: Geoff Davis (Canada), Chris Van Hollen (Pakistan), James A. Himes (Peru), and Diana DeGette (Japan).

==== White ====
A majority of members of the 111th Congress fall into this category. This includes Chuck Grassley (president pro-tempore of the Senate), Nancy Pelosi (Speaker of the House of Representatives), Chuck Schumer (Democratic Senate Leader), Mitch McConnell (Republican Senate Leader), and Kevin McCarthy (Republican House Leader).

== Elections ==
Elections for all House seats and 35 Senate seats were held on November 4, 2008, across the country. The Democratic Party increased its majority in both houses, and regained control of the White House before the end of the second term of George W. Bush.

=== 2008 United States Senate elections ===
Summary of the 2008 United States Senate elections results

Parties									Total
Parties		Democratic	Republican	Independent	Libertarian	Independence	Green	Others	Total
Before these elections		49	49	2	—	—	—	—	100
Not up	Class 1 (2006→2012)	22	8	2	—	—	—	—	31
Not up	Class 3 (2004→2010)	15	19	—	—	—	—	—	34
Not up	Total	37	26	2	—	—	—	—	65
Up	Class 1	—	2	—	—	—	—	—	2
Up	Class 2	12	21	—	—	—	—	—	33
Up	Total	12	23	—	—	—	—	—	35
Incumbent retired	Total before	—	5	—	—	—	—	—	5
Incumbent retired	Held by same party	—	2	—	—	—	—	—	2
Incumbent retired	Replaced by other party	▼3 Republicans replaced by ▲3 Democrats		—	—	—	—	—	3
Incumbent retired	Result after	3	2	—	—	—	—	—	5
Incumbent ran	Total before	12	18	—	—	—	—	—	30
Incumbent ran	Won election	12	13	—	—	—	—	—	25
Incumbent ran	Lost election	▼5 Republicans replaced by ▲5 Democrats		—	—	—	—	—	5
Incumbent ran	Result after	17	13	—	—	—	—	—	30
Net gain/loss		▲8	▼8	—	—	—	—	—	8
Total elected		20	15	—	—	—	—	—	35
Nation-wide vote	Votes (Note: For the Georgia senate race, votes from the runoff election are counted.)	33,650,061	28,863,067	176,752	798,154	450,702	427,427	496,124	64,862,287
Nation-wide vote	Share	51.88%	44.50%	0.27%	1.23%	0.69%	0.66%	0.76%	100%
Result		57	41	2	—	—	—	—	100

Sources:

- Clerk of the U.S. House of Representatives
- U.S. Senate Popular Vote and FEC Total Receipts by Party, via TheGreenPapers.com
- "U.S. Senate (Full results)". CNN. July 1, 2009.
- "The Green Papers 2008 U.S. Senate Popular Vote and FEC Total Receipts by Party". The Green Papers.

=== 2008 United States House of Representatives elections ===
↓
257	178
Democratic	Republican

Party	Voting members				Non-voting members			
Party	Votes	Percentage	Seats	+/−	Votes	Percentage	Seats	+/−
Democratic^{[A]}	64,888,090	52.93%	257	▲21	1,952,133	94.3%	4	▲1
Republican	51,952,981	42.38%	178	▼21	1,919	0.1%	0	▼1
Libertarian	1,083,096	0.88%	0	Steady	—	—	0	Steady
Independent^{[B]}	729,798	0.60%	0	Steady	21,574	1.0%	2	▲1
Green	570,780	0.47%	0	Steady	14,386	0.7%	0	Steady
Constitution	136,021	0.11%	0	Steady	—	—	0	Steady
Independence	300,108	0.24%	0	Steady	—	—	0	Steady
Working Families	294,299	0.24%	0	Steady	—	—	0	Steady
Others	2,631,120	2.15%						
Totals	122,586,293	100.0%	435	—	2,069,306	100.0%	6	▲1
Voter turnout								

Popular vote
Democratic	52.93%
Republican	42.38%
Libertarian	0.88%
Green	0.47%
Others	3.34%

House seats
Democratic	59.08%
Republican	40.92%
