= List of Asian Americans and Pacific Islander Americans in the United States Congress =

Map of congressional districts represented by Asian Americans or Pacific Islander Americans in the 117th Congress.

State had an Asian Senator at the beginning of the 119th Congress State has in the past had an Asian Senator

Numerous Asian Americans and Pacific Islander Americans have served in the U.S. Congress.

Asian Americans are Americans of Asian descent. The term refers to a panethnic group that includes diverse populations with ancestral origins in East Asia, South Asia or Southeast Asia, as defined by the U.S. Census Bureau.

Pacific Islander Americans, also known as Oceanian Americans, Pacific Islander Americans or Native Hawaiian and/or other Pacific Islander Americans, are Americans who have ethnic ancestry among the indigenous peoples of Oceania (viz. Polynesians, Melanesians and Micronesians). For its purposes, the U.S. Census also counts Indigenous Australians as part of this group.

As of January 3, 2025, there are 19 representatives and three senators of Asian-American descent who are currently serving in Congress. In addition, there are three non-voting delegates of Pacific Islander descent who currently are also serving. Since 1900, 21 Pacific Islanders have been elected to the House of Representatives (18 of them as non-voting Resident Commissioners, Delegates or Resident Representatives) and one has been elected to the U.S. Senate. Hawaii was the first territory to send a Pacific Islander to the House of Representatives (in 1900) and was also the first state to send a Pacific Islander to the U.S. Senate (in 1990).

Since 1957, 41 Asian Americans have been elected as U.S. Representatives and nine as U.S. Senators. Hawaii was the first of five states to send an Asian American to the Senate (1959) and New Jersey is the most recent state to elect a senator of similar descent for the first time (2024). With respect to the House of Representatives, California was the first of 13 states to elect an Asian American to the House (1956), and Oklahoma is the most recent to do so for the first time (2020). Three Asian-American women have been elected to the Senate (two of whom currently are incumbents and represent Hawaii and Illinois, respectively), and 13 have been elected to the House (nine of whom currently are incumbents) from seven separate states.

Out of the 22 current AAPI members in the 119th Congress, 19 are Democrats (three senators and 16 representatives) and three are Republicans (three representatives).

== Senate ==
(Note: Senators are organized first in chronological order according to their first term in office, then second in alphabetical order according to their surname.)

Name (lifespan)	Ethnicity	Party	State	Tenure			Notes
Name (lifespan)	Ethnicity	Party	State	Start	End	Duration	Notes
Hiram Fong (1906–2004)	Chinese (Note: First American of Chinese ancestry elected to Congress)	Republican	Hawaii	August 21, 1959	January 3, 1977	17 years, 135 days	Retired
Daniel Inouye (1924–2012)	Japanese (Note: First Japanese American elected to the Senate)	Democratic	Hawaii	January 3, 1963	December 17, 2012	49 years, 349 days	Died in office
S. I. Hayakawa (1906–1992)	Japanese	Republican	California	January 2, 1977	January 3, 1983	6 years, 1 day	Retired
Spark Matsunaga (1916–1990)	Japanese	Democratic	Hawaii	January 3, 1977	April 15, 1990	13 years, 102 days	Died in office
Daniel Akaka (1924–2018)	Hawaiian, Chinese (Note: First Native Hawaiian to serve in the Senate)	Democratic	Hawaii	May 16, 1990	January 3, 2013	22 years, 232 days	Initially appointed; later re-elected Retired
John Ensign (born 1958)	Filipino (Note: First person of Filipino ancestry elected to the Senate)	Republican	Nevada	January 3, 2001	May 3, 2011	10 years, 120 days	Resigned
Mazie Hirono (born 1947)	Japanese (Note: First Asian-American woman elected to the Senate)	Democratic	Hawaii	January 3, 2013	Incumbent	13 years, 313 days	
Tammy Duckworth (born 1968)	Thai Chinese (Note: First Thai American elected to the Senate)	Democratic	Illinois	January 3, 2017	Incumbent	9 years, 313 days	
Kamala Harris (born 1964)	Indian (Note: First person of South Asian ancestry elected to the Senate; together with Pramila Jayapal, first Indian-American woman elected to Congress)	Democratic	California	January 3, 2017	January 18, 2021	4 years, 15 days	Resigned to become Vice President
Andy Kim (born 1982)	Korean (Note: First Korean American elected to the Senate)	Democratic	New Jersey	December 8, 2024	Incumbent	1 year, 338 days	Appointed early following his election.

== House of Representatives ==
(Note: Representatives are organized first in chronological order according to their first term in office, then second in alphabetical order according to their surname.)

Name (lifespan)	Ethnicity	Party	State	Tenure			Notes
Name (lifespan)	Ethnicity	Party	State	Start	End	Duration	Notes
Dalip Singh Saund (1899–1973)	Indian (Note: First AAPI person elected to Congress as a non-delegate, and also first Indian American elected to Congress)	Democratic	California	January 3, 1957	January 3, 1963	6 years, 0 days	Lost reelection
Daniel Inouye (1924–2012)	Japanese (Note: First Japanese American elected to Congress)	Democratic	Hawaii	August 21, 1959	January 3, 1963	3 years, 135 days	Retired to run successfully for U.S. Senate
Spark Matsunaga (1916–1990)	Japanese	Democratic	Hawaii	January 3, 1963	January 3, 1977	14 years, 0 days	Retired to run successfully for U.S. Senate
Patsy Mink (1927–2002)	Japanese (Note: First Asian-American woman elected to Congress)	Democratic	Hawaii	January 3, 1965	January 3, 1977	12 years, 0 days	Retired to run unsuccessfully for U.S. Senate
Patsy Mink (1927–2002)	Japanese	Democratic	Hawaii	September 22, 1990	September 28, 2002	12 years, 6 days	Died in office
Norman Mineta (1931–2022)	Japanese	Democratic	California	January 3, 1975	October 10, 1995	20 years, 280 days	Resigned; Later served as Secretary of Commerce and Secretary of Transportation
Daniel Akaka (1924–2018)	Hawaiian, Chinese (Note: First Native Hawaiian to serve as a voting member of Congress)	Democratic	Hawaii	January 3, 1977	May 16, 1990	13 years, 133 days	Resigned after being appointed to the U.S. Senate
Bob Matsui (1941–2005)	Japanese	Democratic	California	January 3, 1979	January 1, 2005	25 years, 364 days	Died in office
Mervyn Dymally (1926–2012)	Indian (Note: First Dougla elected to Congress)	Democratic	California	January 3, 1981	January 3, 1993	12 years, 0 days	Retired
Pat Saiki (1930–2026)	Japanese	Republican	Hawaii	January 3, 1987	January 3, 1991	4 years, 0 days	Retired to run unsuccessfully for U.S. Senate
Jay Kim (born 1939)	Korean (Note: First Korean American elected to Congress)	Republican	California	January 3, 1993	January 3, 1999	6 years, 0 days	Lost renomination
Bobby Scott (born 1947)	Filipino (Note: First American-born Filipino elected to Congress)	Democratic	Virginia	January 3, 1993	Incumbent	33 years, 313 days	
John Ensign (born 1958)	Filipino	Republican	Nevada	January 3, 1995	January 3, 1999	4 years, 0 days	Retired to run unsuccessfully for U.S. Senate; Later elected to the U.S. Senate from Nevada
David Wu (born 1955)	Taiwanese (Note: First Taiwanese American elected to Congress)	Democratic	Oregon	January 3, 1999	August 3, 2011	12 years, 212 days	Resigned
Mike Honda (born 1941)	Japanese	Democratic	California	January 3, 2001	January 3, 2017	16 years, 0 days	Lost reelection
Bobby Jindal (born 1971)	Indian	Republican	Louisiana	January 3, 2005	January 14, 2008	3 years, 11 days	Resigned to run successfully for Governor
Doris Matsui (born 1944)	Japanese	Democratic	California	March 8, 2005	Incumbent	21 years, 249 days	Elected to succeed late husband
Mazie Hirono (born 1947)	Japanese	Democratic	Hawaii	January 3, 2007	January 3, 2013	6 years, 0 days	Retired to run successfully for U.S. Senate
Steve Austria (born 1958)	Filipino	Republican	Ohio	January 3, 2009	January 3, 2013	4 years, 0 days	Retired following decennial redistricting
Joseph Cao (born 1967)	Vietnamese (Note: First Vietnamese American elected to Congress)	Republican	Louisiana	January 3, 2009	January 3, 2011	2 years, 0 days	Lost reelection
Judy Chu (born 1953)	Chinese (Note: First Chinese-American woman elected to Congress)	Democratic	California	July 14, 2009	Incumbent	17 years, 121 days	
Charles Djou (born 1970)	Thai, Chinese (Note: First Thai American elected to Congress)	Republican	Hawaii	May 22, 2010	January 3, 2011	226 days	Lost reelection
Hansen Clarke (born 1957)	Bangladeshi (Note: First person of Bangladeshi ancestry elected to Congress)	Democratic	Michigan	January 3, 2011	January 3, 2013	2 years, 0 days	Lost renomination following decennial redistricting
Colleen Hanabusa (1951–2026)	Japanese	Democratic	Hawaii	January 3, 2011	January 3, 2015	4 years, 0 days	Retired to run unsuccessfully for U.S. Senate
Colleen Hanabusa (1951–2026)	Japanese	Democratic	Hawaii	November 14, 2016	January 3, 2019	2 years, 50 days	Retired to run unsuccessfully for Governor
Ami Bera (born 1965)	Indian	Democratic	California	January 3, 2013	Incumbent	13 years, 313 days	
Tammy Duckworth (born 1968)	Thai, Chinese (Note: First Thai-American woman elected to Congress)	Democratic	Illinois	January 3, 2013	January 3, 2017	4 years, 0 days	Retired to run successfully for U.S. Senate
Tulsi Gabbard (born 1981)	Samoan (Note: First woman of Pacific Islander ancestry elected to Congress)	Democratic	Hawaii	January 3, 2013	January 3, 2021	8 years, 0 days	Retired after having run unsuccessfully for President
Grace Meng (born 1975)	Taiwanese (Note: First Taiwanese-American woman elected to Congress)	Democratic	New York	January 3, 2013	Incumbent	13 years, 313 days	
Mark Takano (born 1960)	Japanese (Note: First openly gay person of AAPI ancestry elected to Congress)	Democratic	California	January 3, 2013	Incumbent	13 years, 313 days	
Ted Lieu (born 1969)	Taiwanese	Democratic	California	January 3, 2015	Incumbent	11 years, 313 days	
Mark Takai (1967–2016)	Japanese	Democratic	Hawaii	January 3, 2015	July 20, 2016	1 year, 199 days	Died in office
Pramila Jayapal (born 1965)	Indian (Note: Together with Kamala Harris, first Indian-American woman elected to Congress)	Democratic	Washington	January 3, 2017	Incumbent	9 years, 313 days	
Ro Khanna (born 1976)	Indian	Democratic	California	January 3, 2017	Incumbent	9 years, 313 days	
Raja Krishnamoorthi (born 1973)	Indian	Democratic	Illinois	January 3, 2017	January 3, 2027	9 years, 313 days	Retiring
Stephanie Murphy (born 1978)	Vietnamese (Note: First Vietnamese-American woman elected to Congress)	Democratic	Florida	January 3, 2017	January 3, 2023	6 years, 0 days	Retired
TJ Cox (born 1963)	Filipino, Chinese	Democratic	California	January 3, 2019	January 3, 2021	2 years, 0 days	Lost reelection
Andy Kim (born 1982)	Korean	Democratic	New Jersey	January 3, 2019	December 8, 2024	5 years, 340 days	Resigned in order to accept early appointment to the U.S. Senate.
Stephanie Bice (born 1973)	Pakistani (Note: First person of Pakistani ancestry elected to Congress)	Republican	Oklahoma	January 3, 2021	Incumbent	5 years, 313 days	
Kai Kahele (born 1974)	Hawaiian	Democratic	Hawaii	January 3, 2021	January 3, 2023	2 years, 0 days	Retired to run unsuccessfully for Governor
Young Kim (born 1962)	Korean (Note: Reps. Kim, Steel, and Strickland are collectively the first Korean-American women elected to Congress)	Republican	California	January 3, 2021	January 3, 2027	5 years, 313 days	Lost reelection
Michelle Steel (born 1955)	Korean	Republican	California	January 3, 2021	January 3, 2025	4 years, 0 days	Lost reelection
Marilyn Strickland (born 1962)	Korean	Democratic	Washington	January 3, 2021	Incumbent	5 years, 313 days	
Shri Thanedar (born 1955)	Indian	Democratic	Michigan	January 3, 2023	January 3, 2027	3 years, 313 days	Lost renomination
Jill Tokuda (born 1976)	Japanese, Okinawan (Note: First Ryukyuan or Okinawan American elected to Congress)	Democratic	Hawaii	January 3, 2023	Incumbent	3 years, 313 days	
Vince Fong (born 1979)	Chinese	Republican	California	June 3, 2024	Incumbent	2 years, 162 days	
Dave Min (born 1976)	Korean	Democratic	California	January 3, 2025	Incumbent	1 year, 313 days	
Suhas Subramanyam (born 1986)	Indian	Democratic	Virginia	January 3, 2025	Incumbent	1 year, 313 days	
Derek Tran (born 1980)	Vietnamese	Democratic	California	January 3, 2025	Incumbent	1 year, 313 days	
Aisha Wahab (born 1987)	Afghan (Note: First Afghan American elected to Congress)	Democratic	California	September 2, 2026	Incumbent	71 days	

=== Representatives-elect ===
Name (lifespan)	Ethnicity	Party	State	Start	Notes
Pia Dandiya (born 1986–87)	Indian	Democratic	Florida	January 3, 2027	Elect
Dan Koh (born 1985)	Korean	Democratic	Massachusetts	January 3, 2027	Elect
Richard Pan (born 1965)	Taiwanese	Democratic	California	January 3, 2027	Elect
Amish Shah (born 1977–78)	Indian	Democratic	Arizona	January 3, 2027	Elect

== House delegates (non-voting members) ==
Resident Commissioners were House delegates from the Philippines, then an American territory. Two were elected at-large by the Philippine Legislature from 1907 to 1935, and, following the establishment of the Commonwealth of the Philippines, a single Resident Commissioner was appointed by the President of the Philippines (with the consent of the Commonwealth's Commission on Appointments) from 1936 to 1946.

From 1978 to 2009, the Northern Mariana Islands elected four Resident Representatives who had no privileges in the House. American Samoa similarly elected three Delegates at-large from 1971 to 1981 and Guam elected one Washington Representative from 1965 to 1973.

(Note: Delegates are organized first in chronological order according to their first term in office, then second in alphabetical order according to their surname.)

Name (lifespan)	Ethnicity	Party	Territory	Tenure			Notes
Name (lifespan)	Ethnicity	Party	Territory	Start	End	Duration	Notes
Robert Wilcox (1855–1903)	Hawaiian	Home Rule	Hawaii	November 6, 1900	March 4, 1903	2 years, 118 days	Lost reelection
Jonah Kūhiō Kalanianaʻole (1871–1922)	Hawaiian	Republican	Hawaii	March 4, 1903	January 7, 1922	18 years, 309 days	Died in office
Benito Legarda (1853–1915)	Filipino	Federalist	Philippine Islands	November 22, 1907	March 4, 1912	4 years, 103 days	Retired
Pablo Ocampo (1853–1925)	Filipino	Democratic	Philippine Islands	November 22, 1907	November 22, 1909	2 years, 0 days	Retired
Manuel L. Quezón (1878–1944)	Filipino	Nacionalista	Philippine Islands	November 23, 1909	October 15, 1916	6 years, 327 days	Retired; Later served as President of the Philippines
Manuel Earnshaw (1862–1936)	Filipino	Independent	Philippine Islands	March 4, 1913	March 4, 1917	4 years, 0 days	Retired
Jaime C. de Veyra (1873–1963)	Filipino	Nacionalista	Philippine Islands	March 4, 1917	March 4, 1923	6 years, 0 days	Retired
Teodoro R. Yangco (1861–1939)	Filipino, Chinese	Independent	Philippine Islands	March 4, 1917	March 4, 1920	3 years, 0 days	Retired
Isauro Gabaldon (1875–1942)	Filipino	Nacionalista	Philippine Islands	March 4, 1920	July 16, 1928	8 years, 124 days	Resigned
Pedro Guevara (1879–1938)	Filipino	Nacionalista	Philippine Islands	March 4, 1923	February 14, 1936	12 years, 347 days	Retired
William Jarrett (1877–1929)	Hawaiian	Democratic	Hawaii	March 4, 1923	March 4, 1927	4 years, 0 days	Lost reelection
Victor Houston (1876–1959)	Hawaiian	Republican	Hawaii	March 4, 1927	March 4, 1933	6 years, 0 days	Lost reelection
Camilo Osías (1889–1976)	Filipino	Nacionalista	Philippine Islands	March 4, 1929	January 3, 1935	5 years, 305 days	Retired
Francisco Afan Delgado (1886–1964)	Filipino	Nacionalista	Philippine Islands	January 3, 1935	February 14, 1936	1 year, 42 days	Retired
Samuel King (1886–1959)	Hawaiian	Republican	Hawaii	January 3, 1935	January 3, 1943	8 years, 0 days	Resigned
Quintín Paredes (1884–1973)	Filipino	Nacionalista	Philippines	February 14, 1936	September 29, 1938	2 years, 228 days	Resigned
Carlos P. Romulo (1899–1985)	Filipino	Liberal	Philippines	August 10, 1944	July 4, 1946	1 year, 328 days	Office eliminated following the independence of the Philippines
Antonio Won Pat (1908–1987)	Chamorro, Chinese (Note: First Chamorro person elected to Congress)	Democratic	Guam	January 3, 1973	January 3, 1985	12 years, 0 days	Lost reelection
Eddie Pangelinan (1941–2023)	Chamorro	Democratic (1978–1983)	Northern Mariana Islands	January 9, 1978	January 9, 1984	5 years, 130 days	Lost reelection
Eddie Pangelinan (1941–2023)	Chamorro	Republican (1983–1984)	Northern Mariana Islands	January 9, 1978	January 9, 1984	5 years, 130 days	Lost reelection
Fofó Sunia (born 1937)	Samoan (Note: First Samoan delegate elected to Congress)	Democratic	American Samoa	January 3, 1981	September 6, 1988	7 years, 247 days	Resigned
Froilan Tenorio (1939–2020)	Chamorro	Democratic	Northern Mariana Islands	January 9, 1984	January 8, 1990	5 years, 364 days	Retired to run unsuccessfully for Governor of the Northern Mariana Islands; Later successfully ran for Governor of the Northern Mariana Islands
Ben Blaz (1928–2014)	Chamorro	Republican	Guam	January 3, 1985	January 3, 1993	8 years, 0 days	Lost reelection
Eni Faleomavaega (1943–2017)	Samoan	Democratic	American Samoa	January 3, 1989	January 3, 2015	26 years, 0 days	Lost reelection
Juan Babauta (born 1953)	Chamorro, Carolinian (Note: First (and so far only) Carolinian person elected to Congress)	Republican	Northern Mariana Islands	January 8, 1990	January 14, 2002	12 years, 6 days	Retired to run successfully for Governor of the Northern Mariana Islands
Robert Underwood (born 1948)	Chamorro	Democratic	Guam	January 3, 1993	January 3, 2003	10 years, 0 days	Retired to run unsuccessfully for Governor of Guam
Pete Tenorio (born 1941)	Chamorro	Republican	Northern Mariana Islands	January 14, 2002	January 3, 2009	6 years, 355 days	Office replaced by Delegate; Lost election to new office
Michael San Nicolas (born 1981)	Chamorro	Democratic	Guam	January 3, 2019	January 3, 2023	4 years, 0 days	Retired to run unsuccessfully for Governor of Guam
Gregorio Sablan (born 1955)	Chamorro	Independent (2009)	Northern Mariana Islands	January 3, 2009	January 3, 2025	16 years, 0 days	Retired
Gregorio Sablan (born 1955)	Chamorro	Democratic (2009–2014)	Northern Mariana Islands	January 3, 2009	January 3, 2025	16 years, 0 days	Retired
Gregorio Sablan (born 1955)	Chamorro	Independent (2014–2021)	Northern Mariana Islands	January 3, 2009	January 3, 2025	16 years, 0 days	Retired
Gregorio Sablan (born 1955)	Chamorro	Democratic (2021–2025)	Northern Mariana Islands	January 3, 2009	January 3, 2025	16 years, 0 days	Retired
Amata Radewagen (born 1947)	Samoan, Hawaiian	Republican	American Samoa	January 3, 2015	Incumbent	11 years, 313 days	
James Moylan (born 1962)	Chamorro	Republican	Guam	January 3, 2023	January 3, 2027	3 years, 313 days	Lost reelection
Kimberlyn King-Hinds (born 1975)	Chamorro	Republican	Northern Mariana Islands	January 3, 2025	Incumbent	1 year, 313 days	

=== Delegates-elect ===
Name (lifespan)	Ethnicity	Party	Territory	Start	Notes
Alicia Limtiaco (born 1963)	Chamorro	Democratic	Guam	January 3, 2027	Elect

== See also ==
- Congressional Asian Pacific American Caucus
- List of Asian Australian politicians
