= Pablo Ocampo =

Filipino lawyer and nationalist

The Honorable Pablo Ocampo
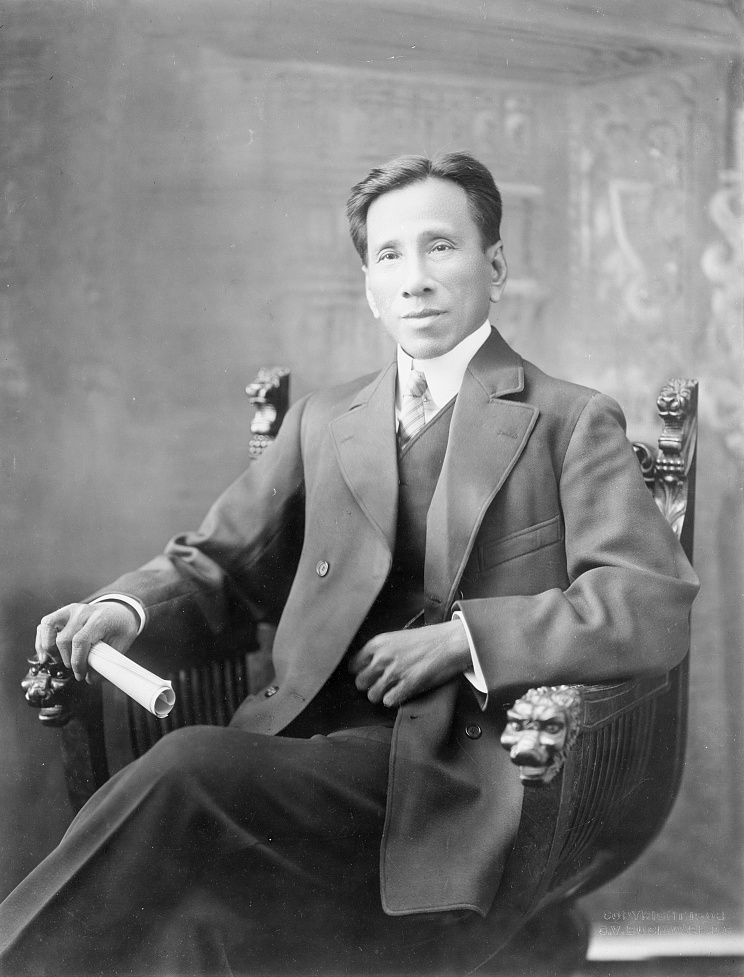
- Ocampo in c. 1908

1st Resident Commissioner of the Philippines to the United States Congress
- In office November 22, 1907 – November 22, 1909 Serving with Benito Legarda
- Appointed by: William Howard Taft
- Preceded by: Position established
- Succeeded by: Manuel L. Quezon

5th Vice Mayor of Manila
- In office August 8, 1915 – March 6, 1920
- Mayor: Félix M. Roxas (1915–1917); Justo Lukban (1917–1920)
- Preceded by: Justo Lukban
- Succeeded by: Juan Posadas

Member of the Philippine Assembly from Manila's 2nd district
- In office 1909–1912
- Preceded by: Fernando María Guerrero
- Succeeded by: Luciano de la Rosa

Member of the Malolos Congress from Bontoc
- In office September 15, 1898 – November 13, 1899

Personal details
- Born: Pablo de León Ocampo; January 25, 1853 Quiapo, Manila, Captaincy General of the Philippines
- Died: February 5, 1925 (aged 72) Manila, Philippine Islands
- Resting place: La Loma Cemetery
- Party: Nacionalista (1909–1925)
- Other political affiliations: Democratic (1907–1909)
- Spouse: Juana Zamora (m. 1885)
- Children: 12
- Education: University of Santo Tomas

Pablo de León Ocampo Sr. (January 25, 1853 – February 5, 1925) was a Filipino lawyer, nationalist, a member of the Malolos Congress, inaugural holder of the office of Resident Commissioner from the Philippine Islands to the United States Congress alongside Benito Legarda and a member of the 2nd Philippine Legislature. He gave his service to his country and helped to bring about the peaceful transition of the Philippines from being a colony of Spain for more than 300 years (1565 to 1898) to what would later become the American Commonwealth of the Philippines.

== Early life and education ==
Ocampo was born in Quiapo, Manila, Spanish Philippines on January 25, 1853. His father was Andres Ocampo, a gobernadorcillo of Santa Cruz, Manila in the Spanish period, while his mother was Macaria de Leon-Ocampo.

Ocampo spent his secondary school years in the Colegio de San Juan de Letran and went on to take up law at the University of Santo Tomas. He finished his degree in March 1882 and went on to practice law in Manila. He studied law at San Juan de Letran College and the University of Santo Tomas graduating in 1882.

== Political career ==
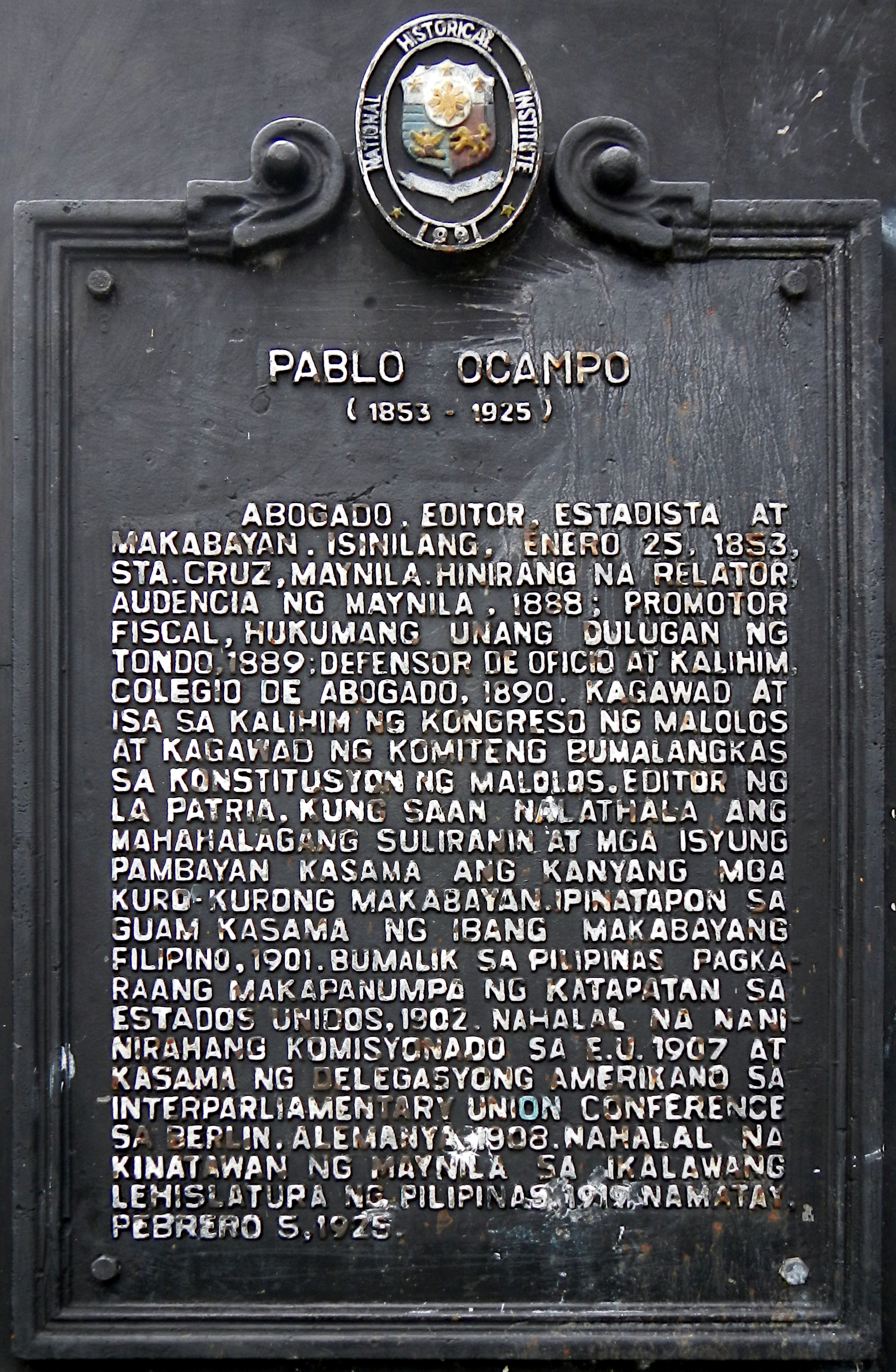
Historical marker installed in Manila in 1991

In 1888, Ocampo was appointed court reporter of Manila. The following year, he was promoted to public prosecutor in the court of first instance in Tondo, Manila. He later became defensor de oficio (public defender) and secretary of the Colegio de Abogados (Bar Association).

While he was not an active supporter of the Revolution during its first phase, Ocampo was appointed member of the Malolos Congress, or formally known as the "National Assembly" of representatives was the constituent assembly of the First Philippine Republic. He represented the Province of Bontoc. Eventually, he was elected secretary and member of the committee which drafted the constitution. He also taught civil law and political economy at the short-lived Universidad Cientifico-Literaria de Filipinas which was run by the revolutionary government.

When the Philippine–American War broke out in February 1899, Ocampo joined Gracio Gonzaga, Florentino Torres, Gregorio del Pilar, and Lorenzo Zialcita in the commission that met with Elwell S. Otis to put a stop to the hostilities. Lorenzo Zialcita would later become governor of the Province of Bataan from 1905 to 1907. On July 3, 1899, Ocampo was appointed by Emilio Aguinaldo as sole representative of the Revolutionary government in the city of Manila and also served as head of its intelligence office. The appointment was made while Aguinaldo and his troops were retreating to the north.

Ocampo became the editor of La Patria, a nationalist paper that was founded on September 16, 1899. The paper provided him a venue to share his nationalistic views which gained the ire of the American authorities. Arthur MacArthur Jr., who was the then-Governor-General of the occupied Philippines, issued an order to deport him to Guam on January 7, 1901. Nine days later, Ocampo saw himself being shipped on the American vessel Rosecrans along with other revolutionaries such as Apolinario Mabini, Julian Gerona, Maximo Hizon, Pío del Pilar, Mariano Llanera, and Artemio Ricarte. He lived in exile in Guam for almost two years and was only able to return to the Philippines after President William McKinley granted him amnesty. He finally took the oath of allegiance in 1902.

It was obvious that Ocampo has softened his stand on national issues after his exile. He did not support the call for immediate independence which was the stand of other Filipino politicians. Instead of joining the Partido Independista Immediatista, he joined the Union Nacionalista. In 1907, he ran for a seat in the 1st Philippine Legislature to represent the southern district of Manila. He, along with Benito Valdez, Rafael del Pan, and Manuel Ravago, lost to Fernando María Guerrero.

On November 22, 1907, Ocampo was elected by the Assembly as the first Resident Commissioner of the Philippines to the United States of America. He won against Rafael del Pan, Justo Lukban, Jaime C. de Veyra, and Alberto Barretto. He and Benito Legarda, who was elected to the same position by the Philippine Commission, sailed for Washington on December 21, 1907. The two became the first Filipino Resident Commissioners to be seated in the United States Congress. This time, Ocampo advocated immediate independence as it was the stand of the dominant political party in the Philippines.

As resident commissioner, Ocampo held that it was not for the United States to judge whether or not Filipinos were ready to run the government. He was convinced that independence would motivate Filipinos to strengthen the government and improve the country's economy. Ocampo strongly opposed the Payne–Aldrich Tariff Act which allowed limitless entry of American products into the Philippines, while Philippine products such as sugar and tobacco going to the U.S. fell under import restrictions.

Ocampo was a part of the American delegation sent to the 15th Inter-Parliamentary Union conference held in Berlin, Germany, on September 17 to 19, 1908. In 1909, after two years in Washington, D.C., Ocampo ran once for a seat to represent the southern district of Manila in the 2nd Philippine Legislature and won. As a legislator, he opposed the passage of the Negotiable Instruments Law. He was a member of the committees on appropriations, metropolitan relations, and the committee for the city of Manila. On four occasions, he served as head of committee of the whole house.

After his stint as legislator, Ocampo served as the 2nd Vice Mayor of Manila from August 8, 1911, to March 6, 1920. He then retired from politics.

== Personal life ==
Ocampo married Juana Zamora-Ocampo on September 5, 1885. The couple had twelve children but only six reached adulthood: Concepcion O. Santiago, Jesus, Pedro, Mariano, Rosario O. Alejandro, and Pacita O. Campos. Concepcion married Francisco Santiago, the Father of Kundiman Art Song. The son of Jesus, Pablo "Pabling" V. Ocampo III served the Philippine Congress representing the 6th District of Manila prior to the declaration of Martial Law by then President Ferdinand Marcos. Sandy Ocampo, the daughter of Pabling, is a former representative of the 6th District of Manila in the Philippine Congress. Rosario was instrumental in the rebuilding of the Antipolo Cathedral after it was destroyed during World War II. She became caretaker of Our Lady of Peace and Good Voyage (Spanish: Nuestra Señora de la Paz y del Buen Viaje), also known as the Virgin of Antipolo (Filipino: Birhen ng Antipolo) until her death. Pacita married Federico Diaz Campos who became a colonel of the Philippine Constabulary Medical Corps.

== Death ==
Ocampo died on February 5, 1925, at the age of 72. His remains lie at the Ocampo-Campos family mausoleum in Antipolo, Rizal.

A main thoroughfare in Metro Manila was renamed Pablo Ocampo Street (formerly Vito Cruz Street) in his honor. Along this road, one can find a monument for his contributions to the history of the Philippines. The monument, statue of his likeness, could be found between Rizal Memorial Coliseum and Century Park Hotel in Malate, Manila.

== See also ==
- List of Asian Americans and Pacific Islands Americans in the United States Congress

U.S. House of Representatives
New seat	Resident Commissioner of the Philippines; 1907–1909; Served alongside: Benito Legarda	Succeeded by Manuel L. Quezon
Political offices
Preceded by Justo Lukban	Vice Mayor of Manila; 1915–1920	Succeeded by Juan Posadas
