= Insular Government of the Philippine Islands =

1902–1935 US territory of the Philippines

Insular Government of the Philippine Islands Gobierno Insular de las Islas Filipinas
- 1899–1935
- Flag of the United States Flag of the Philippine Islands Flags (1920–1935) Coat of arms (1905–1935)
- Anthems: "Hail, Columbia" (until 1931) "The Star-Spangled Banner"(from 1931) "The Philippine Hymn"
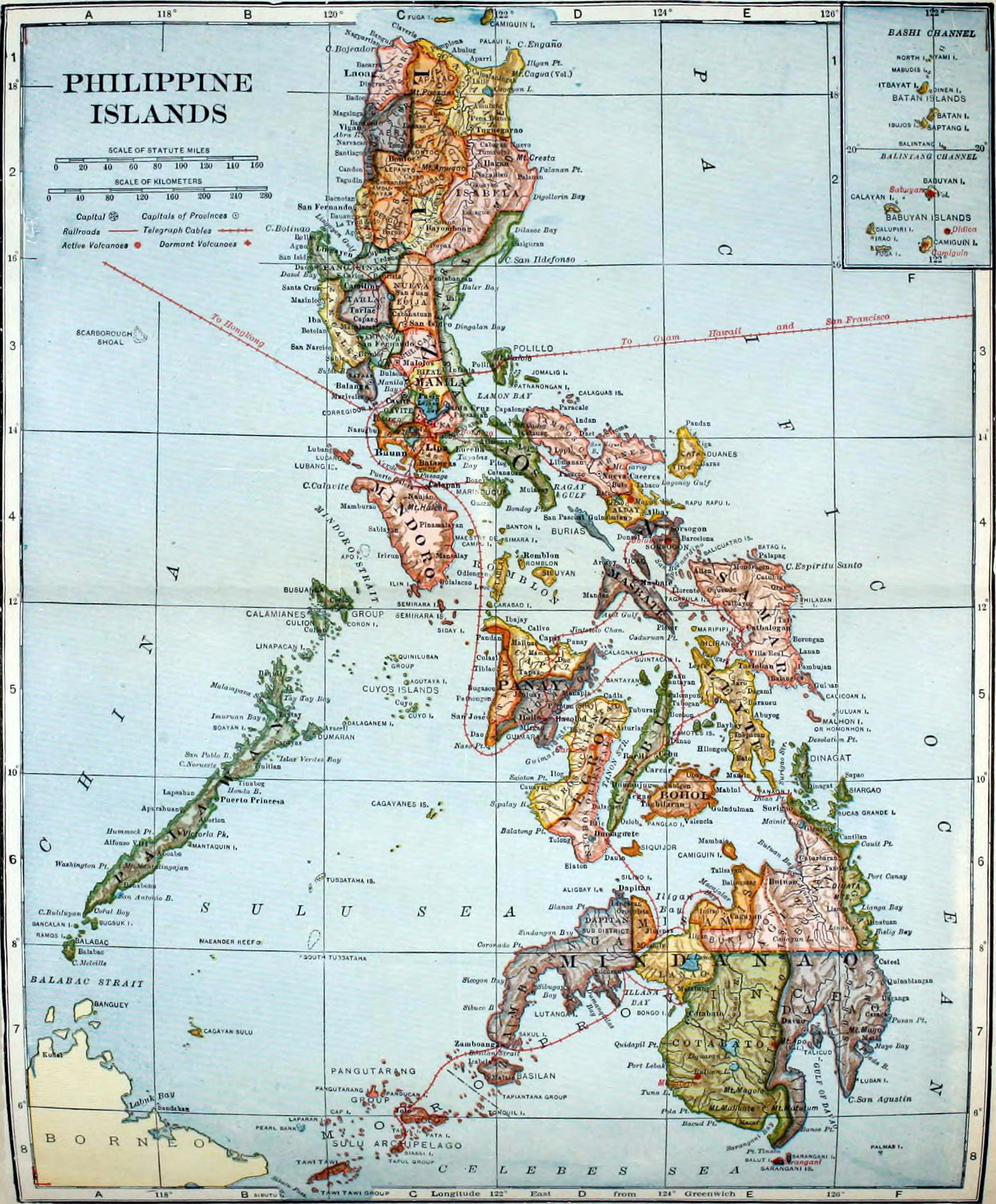
- 1921 map of the Philippine Islands
- Status: Unincorporated and organized United States territory (Note: The Philippine islands belonged to, but were not a part of, the United States. See the page for the Insular Cases for more information.)
- Capital and largest city: Manila
- Official languages: English • Spanish
- Common languages: Philippine languages • Hokkien (Note: Among Chinese Filipinos)
- Religion (1910): 78.7% Catholicism; 21.3% other (including Indigenous Philippine folk religions and Islam)
- Demonyms: Filipino; Philippine Islander (uncommon); Philippine (used for certain common nouns)
- Government: Unitary to devolved presidential dependency
- President
  - 1899–1901 (first): William McKinley
  - 1933–1935 (last): Franklin D. Roosevelt
- Governor-General
  - 1900–1904: William Howard Taft
  - 1913–1921: Francis Burton Harrison
  - 1921–1927: Leonard Wood
  - 1927–1929: Henry L. Stimson
  - 1929–1932: Dwight F. Davis
  - 1933–1935: Frank Murphy
- Legislature: Philippine Legislature
  - Upper house: Philippine Commission (1902–1907 unicameral); Philippine Commission (1907–1916); Senate (1916–1935)
  - Lower house: Philippine Assembly (1907–1916); House of Representatives (1916–1935)
- History
  - Established: April 11, 1899
  - Treaty of Paris ratified: April 11, 1899
  - Philippine Organic Act: July 1, 1902
  - Jones Law: August 29, 1916
  - Tydings–McDuffie Act: November 15, 1935

Area
- 1903: 297,916 km^{2} (115,026 sq mi)
- 1918: 296,296 km^{2} (114,401 sq mi)

Population
  - 1903: 7,635,426
  - 1918: 10,350,640
- Currency: Philippine peso (₱)
- Time zone: UTC+08:00 (PST)
Preceded by	Succeeded by
Military Government of the Philippine Islands; Sultanate of Sulu	Commonwealth of the Philippines

The Insular Government of the Philippine Islands (Spanish: Gobierno Insular de las Islas Filipinas) was an unincorporated territory of the United States that was established on April 11, 1899, upon ratification of the 1898 Treaty of Paris. It was reorganized in 1935 in preparation for later independence. The Insular Government was preceded by the Military Government of the Philippine Islands and was followed by the Commonwealth of the Philippines.

The Philippines was acquired from Spain by the United States in 1898 following the Spanish–American War. Resistance led to the Philippine–American War, in which the United States suppressed the nascent First Philippine Republic. In 1902, the United States Congress passed the Philippine Organic Act, which organized the government and served as its basic law. This act provided for a governor-general appointed by the president of the United States, as well as a bicameral Philippine Legislature with the appointed Philippine Commission as the upper house and a fully elected, Filipino lower house, the Philippine Assembly. The Internal Revenue Law of 1904 provided for general internal revenue taxes, documentary taxes and transfer of livestock. A wide variety of revenue stamps were issued in denominations ranging from one centavo to 20,000 pesos.

The term "insular" refers to the fact that the government operated under the authority of the Bureau of Insular Affairs. Puerto Rico also had an insular government at this time. From 1901 to 1922, the U.S. Supreme Court wrestled with the constitutional status of these governments in the Insular Cases. In Dorr v. United States (1904), the court ruled that Filipinos did not have a constitutional right to trial by jury. In the Philippines itself, the term "insular" had limited usage. On banknotes, postage stamps, and the coat of arms, the government referred to itself simply as the "Philippine Islands".

The 1902 Philippine Organic Act was replaced in 1916 by the Jones Law, which ended the Philippine Commission and provided for both houses of the Philippine Legislature to be elected. In 1935, the Insular Government was replaced by the Commonwealth. Commonwealth status was intended to last ten years, during which the country would be prepared for independence.

== History ==
The Insular Government evolved from the Taft Commission, or Second Philippine Commission, appointed on March 16, 1900. This group was headed by William Howard Taft, and was granted legislative powers by President William McKinley in September 1900. The commission created a judicial system, an educational system, a civil service, and a legal code. The legality of these actions was contested until the passage of the Spooner Amendment in 1901, which granted the U.S. president authority to govern the Philippines.

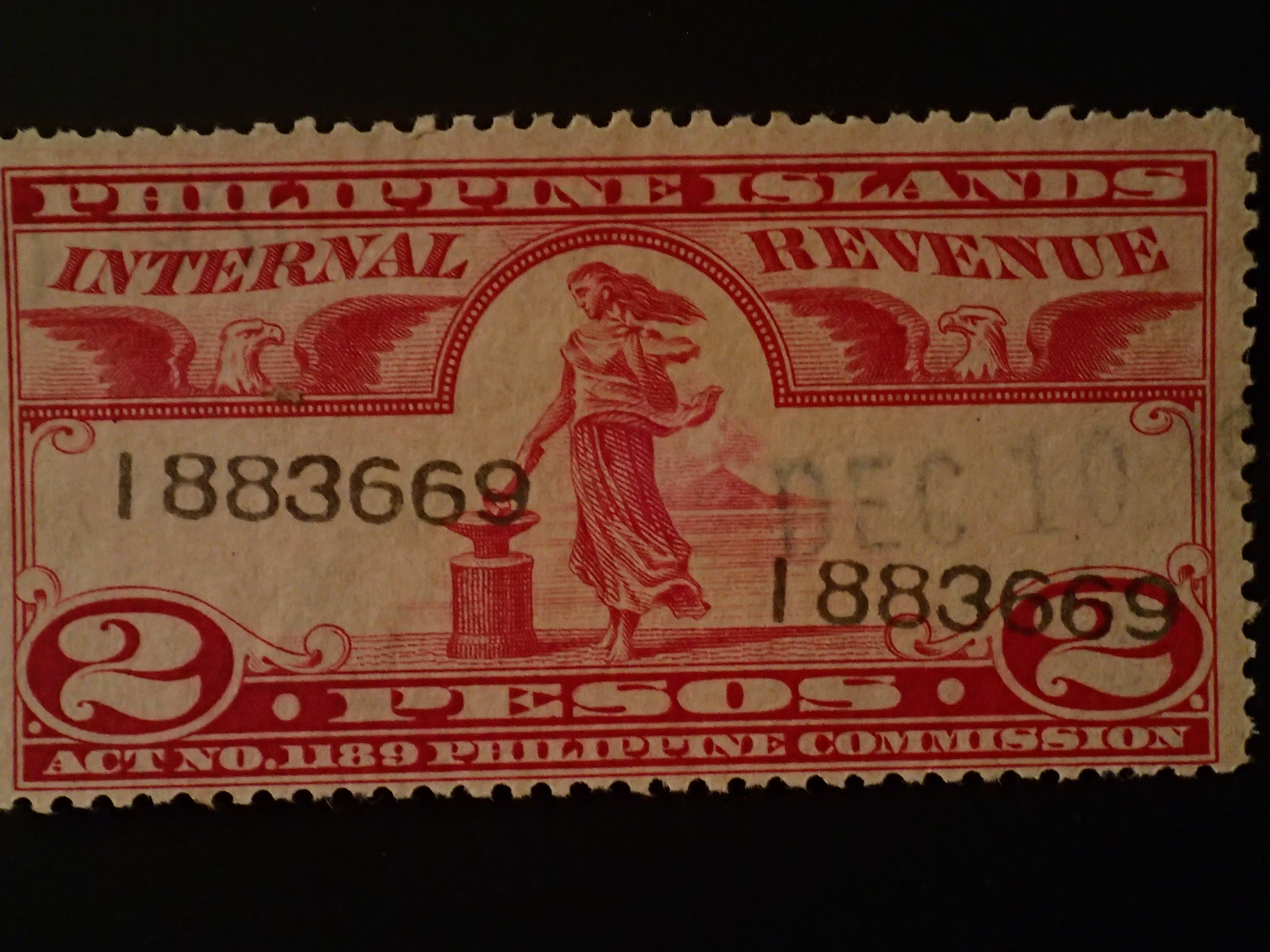
Revenue stamp for the Philippine Islands issued in 1930.

The Insular Government saw its mission as one of tutelage, preparing the Philippines for eventual independence. On July 4, 1901, Taft was appointed "civil governor", who also named his cabinet at his inaugural address. Military Governor Adna Chaffee retained authority in disturbed areas. On July 4, 1902, the office of military governor was abolished, and Taft became the first US governor-general of the Philippine Islands.

The Philippine Organic Act disestablished the Catholic Church as the state religion. In 1904, Taft negotiated the purchase of 390,000 acres (160,000 ha) of church property for $7.5 million. Despite this, the Insular Government failed to investigate the land titles of the friars' and restore them to the patrimony of the Filipinos. The Insular Government then established a land titling system for these lands, but due to a small surveyor staff, a lot of parcels of land remained untitled.

Two years after the completion and publication of a census, a general election was conducted for the choice of delegates to a popular assembly. An elected Philippine Assembly was convened in 1907 as the lower house of a bicameral legislature, with the Philippine Commission as the upper house. The 1909 U.S. Payne–Aldrich Tariff Act provided for free trade with the Philippines. Every year from 1907, the Philippine Assembly (and later the Philippine Legislature) passed resolutions expressing the Filipino desire for independence.

=== Jones Law ===
Philippine nationalists led by Manuel L. Quezon and Sergio Osmeña enthusiastically endorsed the draft Jones Bill of 1912, which provided for Philippine independence after eight years, but later changed their views, opting for a bill which focused less on time than on the conditions of independence. The nationalists demanded complete and absolute independence to be guaranteed by the United States, since they feared that too-rapid independence from American rule without such guarantees might cause the Philippines to fall into Japanese hands. The Jones Bill was rewritten and passed a Congress controlled by Democrats in 1916 with a later date of independence. The Democratic Party in the United States had strongly opposed acquisitions of the Philippines in the first place, and increasingly became committed to independence. The election of Democrat Woodrow Wilson, who advocated a constitutional government in the Philippines as a step towards independence, in 1912 opened up the opportunity. He appointed Francis Burton Harrison as governor, and Harrison replaced mainlanders with Filipinos in the bureaucracy. At his departure in 1921, of the 13,757 government bureaucrats, 13,143 were Filipinos; they occupied 56 of the top 69 positions.

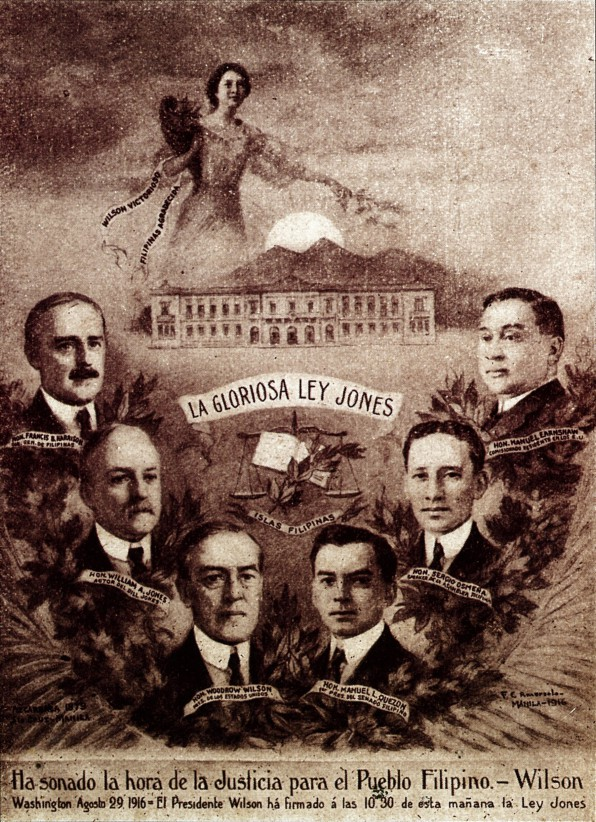
Poster advertising the passage of the Jones Law

The Jones Law, or Philippine Autonomy Act, replaced the Organic Act. Its preamble stated that the eventual independence of the Philippines would be American policy, subject to the establishment of a stable government. The law maintained an appointed governor-general, but established a bicameral Philippine Legislature to replace the elected Philippine Assembly (lower house); it replaced the appointive Philippine Commission (upper house) with an elected senate.

Filipino activists suspended the independence campaign during the First World War and supported the United States and the Allies of World War I against the German Empire. After the war, they resumed their independence drive with great vigour. On March 17, 1919, the Philippine Legislature passed a "Declaration of Purposes", which stated the inflexible desire of the Filipino people to be free and sovereign. A Commission of Independence was created to study ways and means of attaining liberation ideal. This commission recommended the sending of an independence mission to the United States. The "Declaration of Purposes" referred to the Jones Law as a veritable pact, or covenant, between the American and Filipino peoples whereby the United States promised to recognize the independence of the Philippines as soon as a stable government should be established. American Governor-General Harrison had concurred in the report of the Philippine Legislature as to a stable government.

The Philippine Legislature funded an independence mission to the United States in 1919. The mission departed Manila on February 28 and met in America with and presented their case to Secretary of War Newton D. Baker. US President Woodrow Wilson, in his 1921 farewell message to Congress, certified that the Filipino people had performed the condition imposed on them as a prerequisite to independence, declaring that, this having been done, the duty of the U.S. is to grant Philippine independence. Neither Congress nor Warren G. Harding, Wilson's successor as president, acted on Wilson's recommendation. In 1921, US President Harding sent William Cameron Forbes and Leonard Wood as heads of the Wood-Forbes Commission to investigate conditions in the Philippines. The Commission concluded that Filipinos were not yet ready for independence from the United States, a finding that was widely criticized in the Philippines.

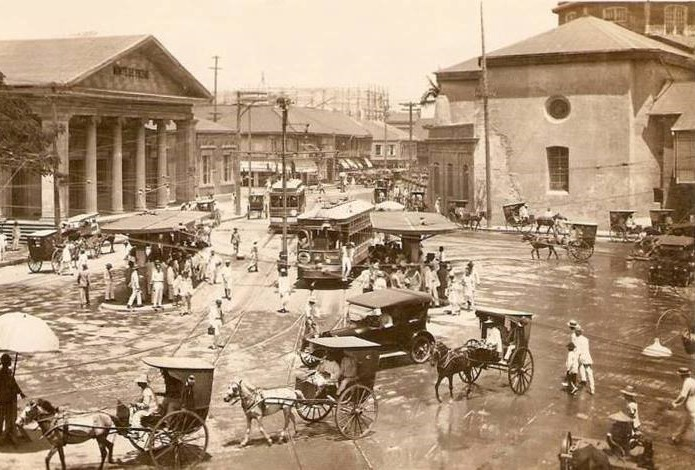
Manila, capital of the Insular Government, March 1920.

=== Road to commonwealth status ===
After the first independence mission, public funding of such missions was ruled illegal. Subsequent independence missions in 1922, 1923, 1930, 1931, 1932, and two missions in 1933 were funded by voluntary contributions. Numerous independence bills were submitted to the US Congress, which passed the Hare–Hawes–Cutting Bill on December 30, 1932. US President Herbert Hoover vetoed the bill on January 13, 1933. Congress overrode the veto on January 17, and the Hare–Hawes–Cutting Act became US law. The law promised Philippine independence after 10 years, but reserved several military and naval bases for the United States, as well as imposing tariffs and quotas on Philippine exports. The law also required the Philippine Senate to ratify the law. Quezon urged the Philippine Senate to reject the bill, which it did. Quezon himself led the twelfth independence mission to Washington to secure a better independence act. The result was the Tydings–McDuffie Act of 1934 which was very similar to the Hare–Hawes–Cutting Act except in minor details. The Tydings–McDuffie Act was ratified by the Philippine Senate. The law provided for the granting of Philippine independence by 1946.

The Tydings–McDuffie Act provided for the drafting and guidelines of a constitution for a ten-year "transitional period" as the Commonwealth of the Philippines before the granting of Philippine independence. On May 5, 1934, the Philippines Legislature passed an act setting the election of convention delegates. Governor-General Frank Murphy designated July 10 as the election date, and the Convention held its inaugural session on July 30. The completed draft Constitution was approved by the Convention on February 8, 1935, approved by US President Franklin Roosevelt on March 23, and ratified by popular vote on May 14. The first election under the new 1935 constitution was held on September 17, and on November 15, 1935, the Commonwealth was established.

== Governor-general ==
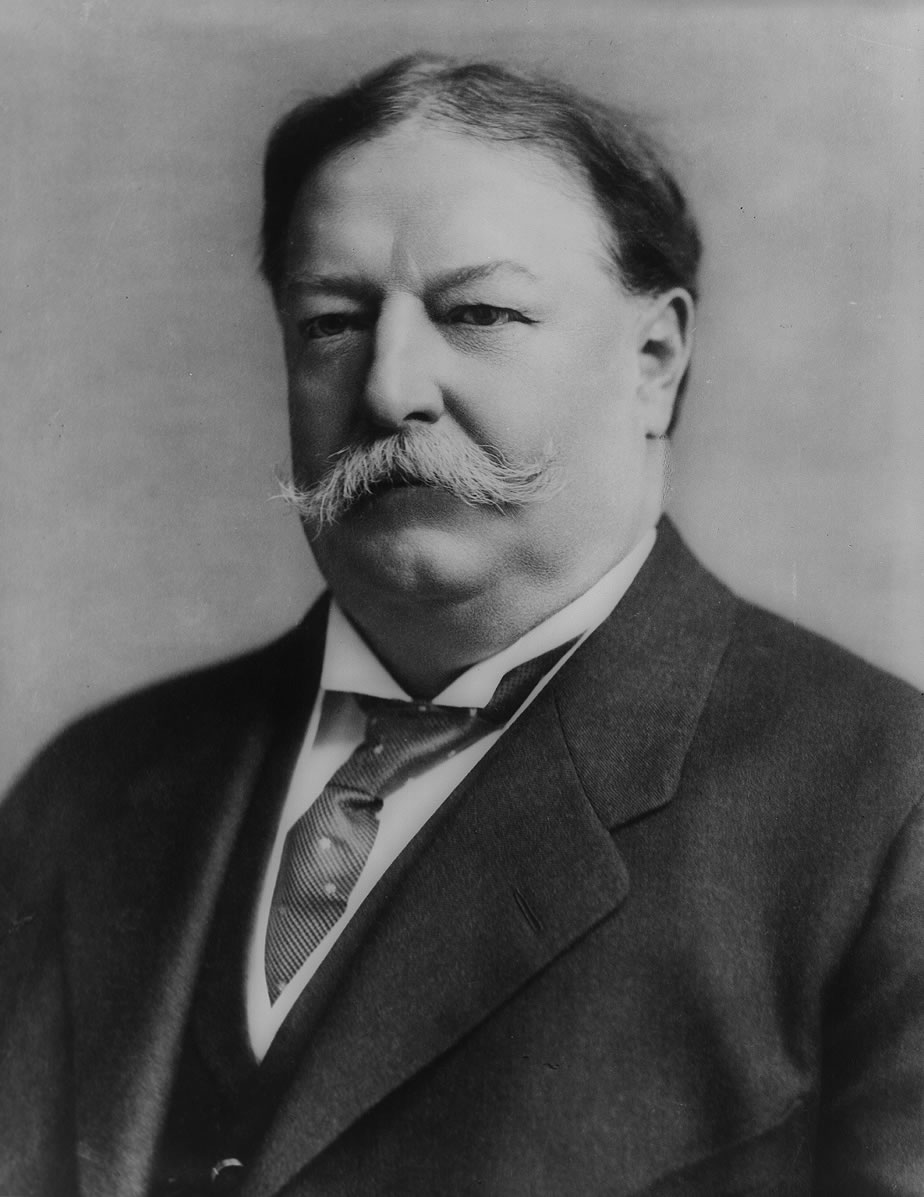
William Howard Taft was the first civil governor of the Philippine Islands

On July 4, 1901, executive authority over the islands was transferred to the president of the Philippine Commission, who had the title of "civil governor"—a position appointed by the president of the United States and approved by the United States Senate. For the first year a military governor, Adna Chaffee, ruled parts of the country still resisting American rule, concurrent with civil governor William Howard Taft. Disagreements between the two were not uncommon. The following year, on July 4, 1902, the civil governor became the sole executive authority of the islands. Chaffee remained as Commander of the Philippine Division until September 30, 1902.

The title was changed to "Governor-General" in 1905 by Act of Congress (Public 43 – February 6, 1905).

=== Governor Harrison ===
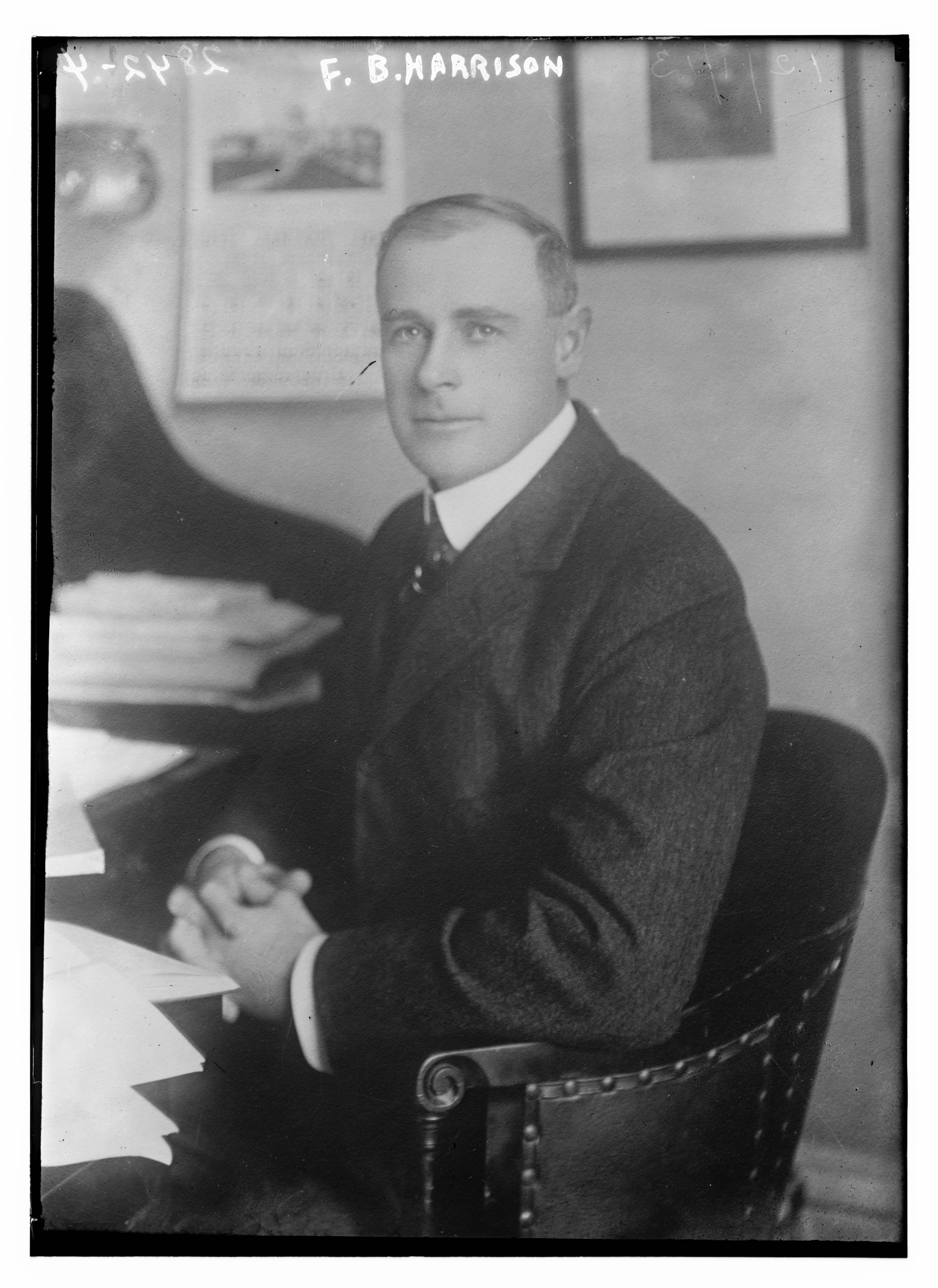
Harrison in 1913

Francis Burton Harrison was Governor-General from 1913 to 1921 under President Woodrow Wilson, a Democrat. He advocated for and oversaw the process of Filipinization, or the transfer of authority to Filipinos in the United States territory's Insular Government to better prepare for independence. He was governor-general during the passages of the Philippine Autonomy Act, otherwise known as the Jones Act, which converted the partially elected Philippine Legislature with the appointed Philippine Commission as the upper house and the elected Philippine Assembly as the lower house, to a fully elected Philippine Legislature with the Philippine Senate replacing the now-dissolved Philippine Commission and the Philippine Assembly renamed the House of Representatives of the Philippines.

Despite the length of his tenure as governor-general he vetoed only five bills, the least number by any American governor-general in the Philippines. His pro-Filipino stance made him a popular figure in the Philippines but also the object of criticism of conservative Americans who viewed his liberal governance as not supportive enough of US interests.

Under his administration, the Governor-General's Spanish-era mansion called Malacañang Palace was expanded with the construction of an executive building. When he left the Philippines, Harrison lived in Scotland until being recalled to the Philippines in 1934 during a period of transition from an unincorporated territory of the United States to the Commonwealth of the Philippines.

In 1921, Republican president Warren G. Harding sent William Cameron Forbes and Leonard Wood as heads of the Wood-Forbes Commission to investigate conditions in the Philippines. The Commission concluded that Filipinos were not yet ready for independence from the United States, a finding that was widely criticized in the Philippines.

On November 15, 1935, the Commonwealth government was inaugurated. The office of President of the Philippines was created to replace the Governor-General as Chief Executive, taking over many of the former's duties. The American Governor-General then became known as the High Commissioner to the Philippines.

== Resident commissioners ==
From the passage of the Organic Act until independence, the Philippine Islands were represented in the United States House of Representatives by two, and then one, resident commissioners of the Philippines. Similar to delegates and the Resident Commissioner of Puerto Rico, they were nonvoting members of Congress.

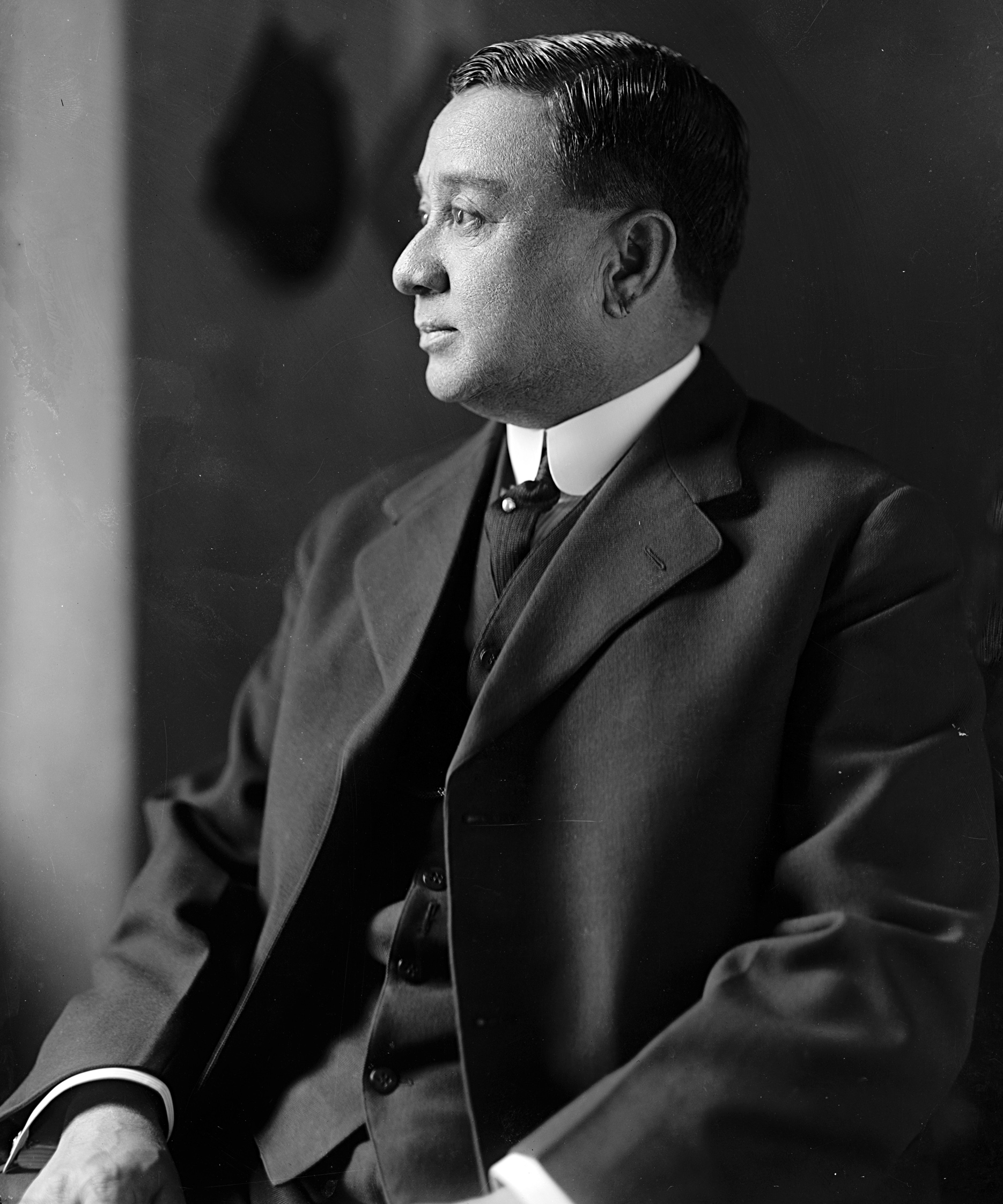
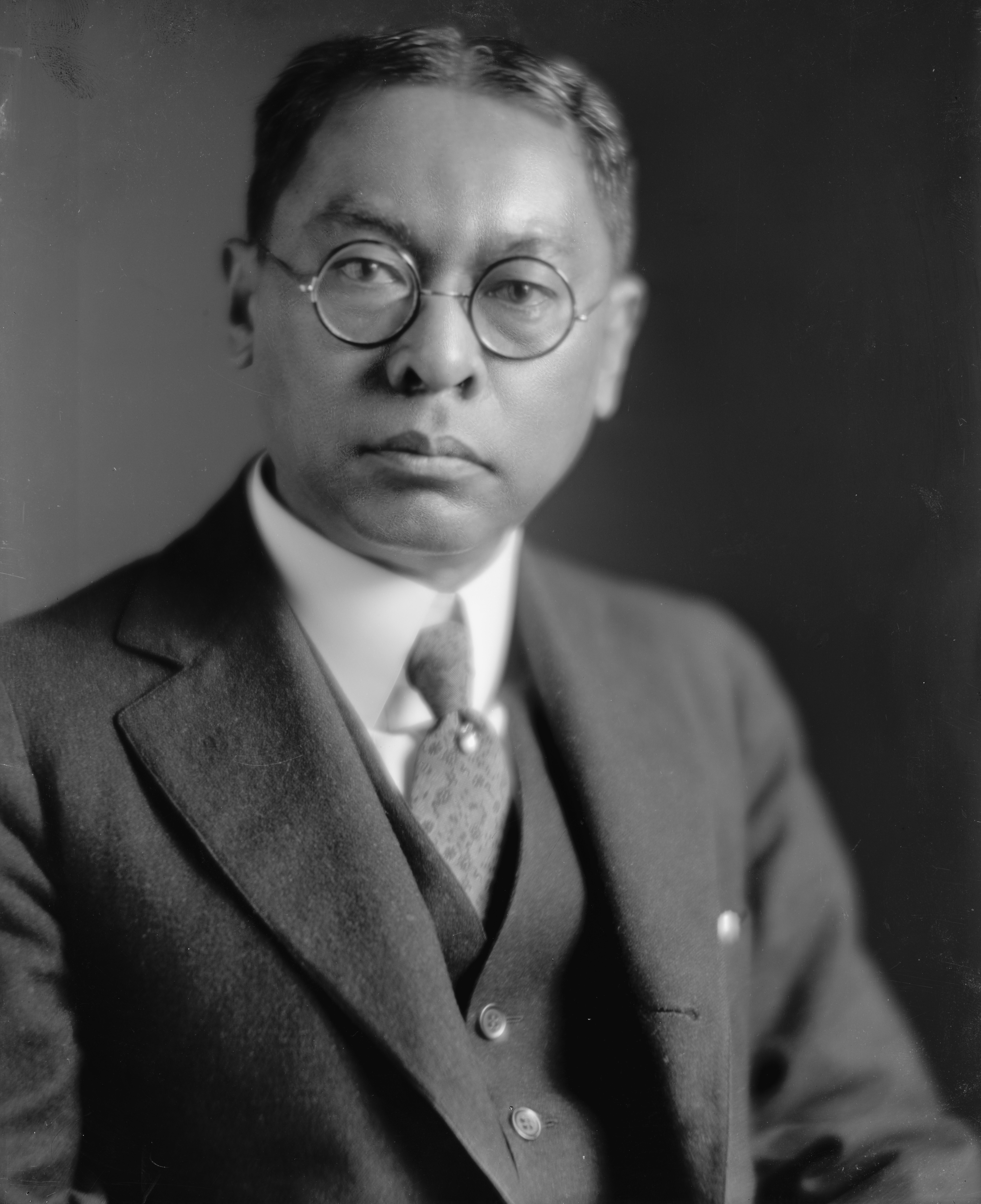
Resident commissioners of the Philippines seat A. left: Benito Cosmé Legarda y Tuason, term. 1907-1912. middle: Tomas Earnshaw y Noguera, term. 1913-1916. right: Jaime Carlos de Veyra y Díaz, term. 1916-1923.

== Territorial divisions ==
Administrative divisions of the Philippine Islands since 1908.

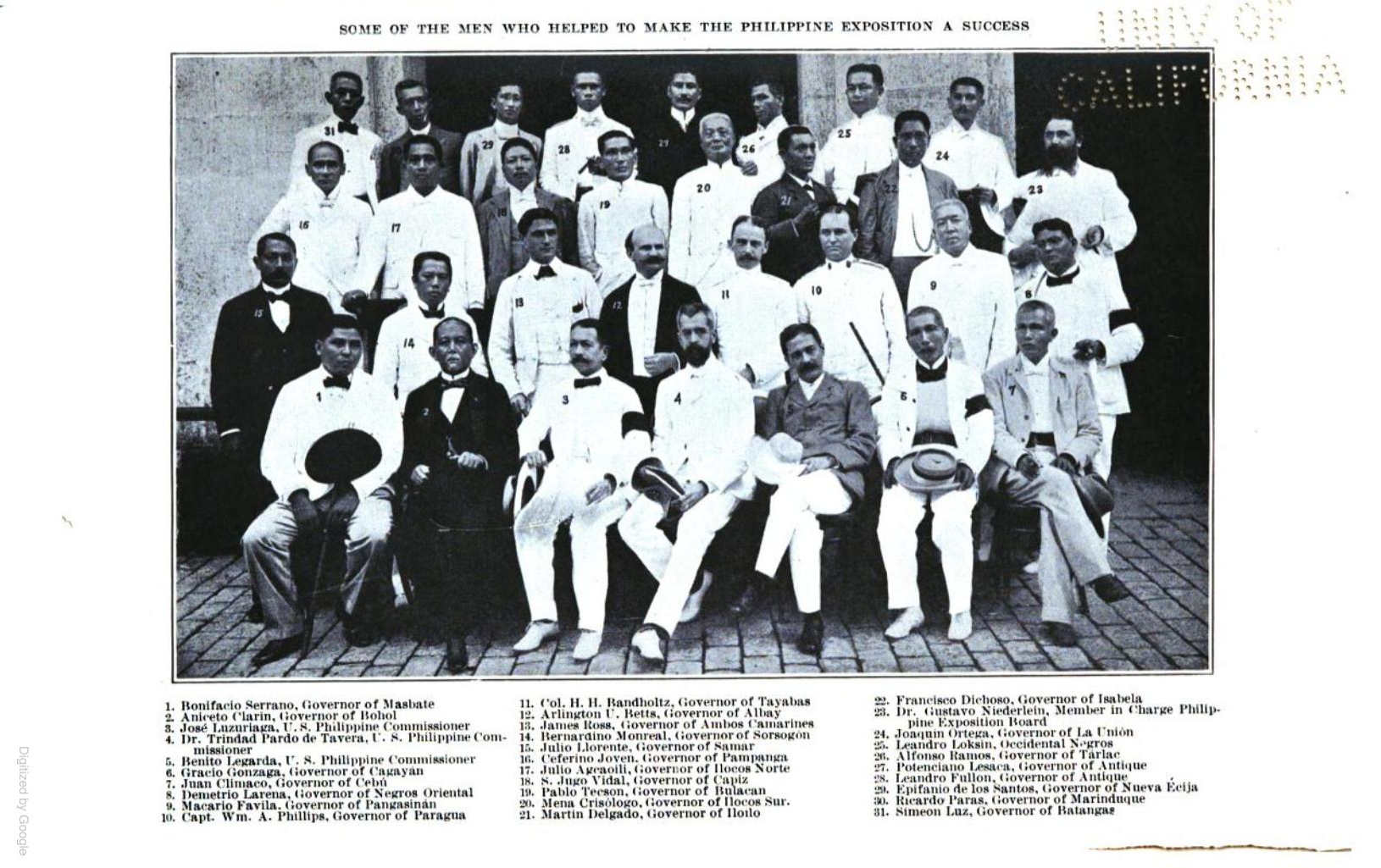
Group photo of the Philippine Exposition Board with the governors of the different provinces in the Philippine Islands, published c. 1905

=== Provinces ===
- Luzon Island (25 administrative units): Bulacán, Pampanga, Zambales, Bataan, Nueva Écija, Tarlac, La Unión, Cavite, Laguna, Rizal, Batangas, Pangasinan, Ilocos Norte, Ilocos Sur, Tayabas, Abra, Lepanto-Bontoc, Cagayán (including Babuyan Islands), Isabela, Nueva Vizcaya, Albay, Camarines Norte, Camarines Sur, Sorsogon.
- Mindoro, Luban, Ilin (one administrative unit): Mindoro.
- Panay Island (three administrative units): Cápiz, Iloilo, Antique.
- Negros (2 administrative units): Negros Occidental and Negros Oriental
- Samar (one administrative unit): Samar.
- Leyte (one administrative unit): Leyte.
- Palawan and Calamian Islands (one administrative unit): Palawan.
- Cebú (one administrative unit): Cebú.
- Mindanao (four administrative units): Agusan, Misamis, Moro Province (including Sulu Archipelago), and Surigao.

=== Sub-provinces ===
- Abra (from Ilocos Sur)
- Amburayan (from Lepanto-Bontoc)
- Apayao (from Cagayan)
- Batanes (from Cagayan)
- Bontoc (from Lepanto-Bontoc)
- Bukidnon (from Agusan)
- Butuan (from Agusan)
- Catanduanes (from Albay)
- Kalinga (from Lepanto-Bontoc)
- Lepanto (from Lepanto-Bontoc)
- Marinduque (from Tayabas)
- Masbate (from Sorsogon)
- Romblon (from Capiz)
- Siquijor (from Negros Oriental)

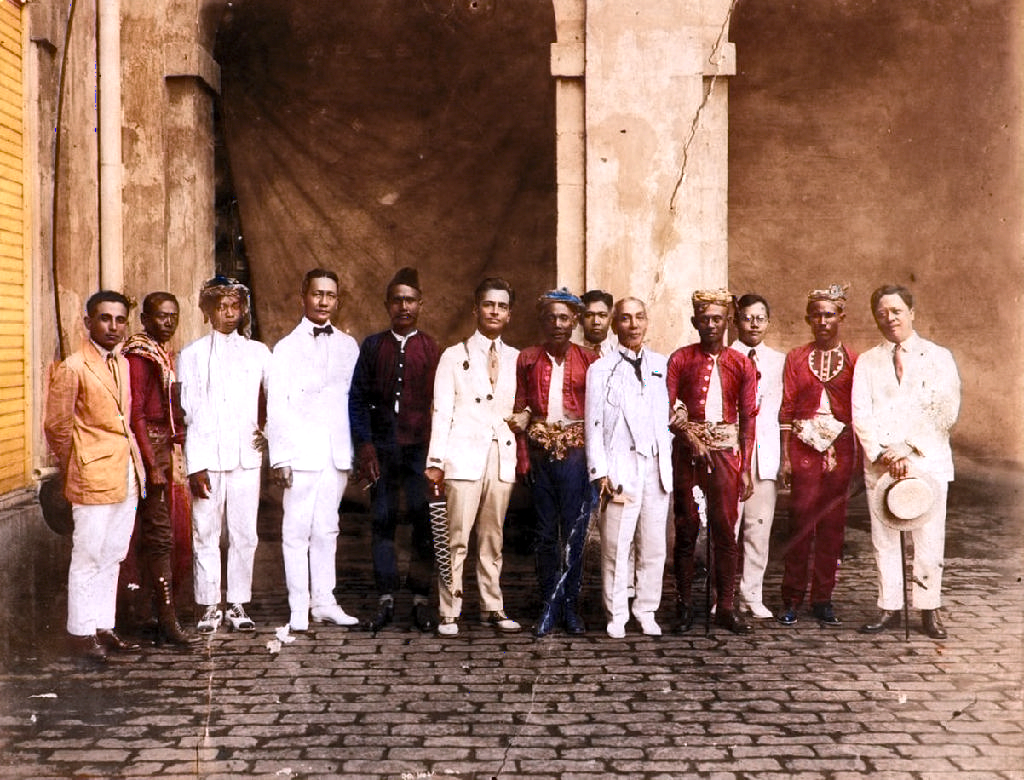
Philippine Government with the Moro leaders

Military districts El Príncipe and Binangonan de Lampon were separated from Nueva Écija and Laguna and transferred to Tayabas in 1902. Morong was converted to a regular province of Rizal in 1901; Manila Province (except the City of Manila) was transferred to Rizal in the same year. Romblon became a regular province in 1901, but was created as a sub-province of Capiz once again in 1907 and reestablished as a separate province in 1918. In 1908, Abra was annexed into Ilocos Sur in an attempt to resolve Abra's financial difficulties, but was re-established as a province under Act 2683 on March 9, 1917. Batanes was created as a sub-province of Cagayan on August 20, 1907 by the approval of Act No. 1693; in 1909, the new American authorities organized it into an independent province, upon the approval of Act No. 1952.

== See also ==
- History of the Philippines (1898–1946)
- United States Military Government of the Philippine Islands
- First Philippine Republic
- Second Philippine Republic
- Commonwealth of the Philippines
- Insular Government of Porto Rico
- Naval Government of Guam
