= Philippine Legislature =

American colonial legislature, 1907–1935

Type
- Type: Bicameral
- Houses: Philippine Commission and Philippine Assembly (1907–1916); Senate and House of Representatives (1916–1935)

History
- Founded: October 16, 1907
- Disbanded: November 15, 1935
- Preceded by: Second Philippine Commission
- Succeeded by: National Assembly of the Philippines

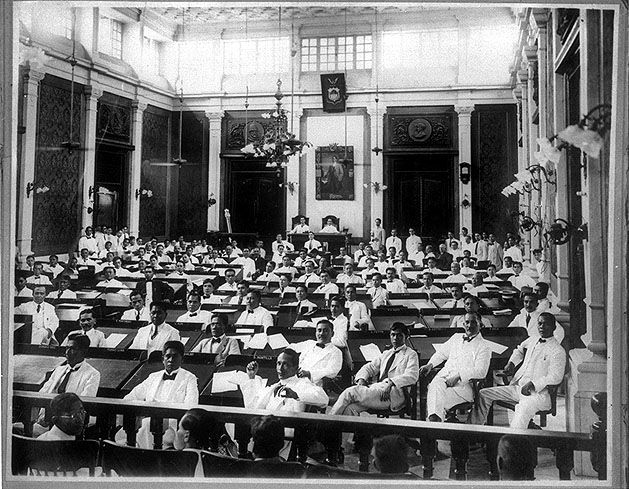
Joint session of the Philippine Legislature, Manila. November 15, 1916

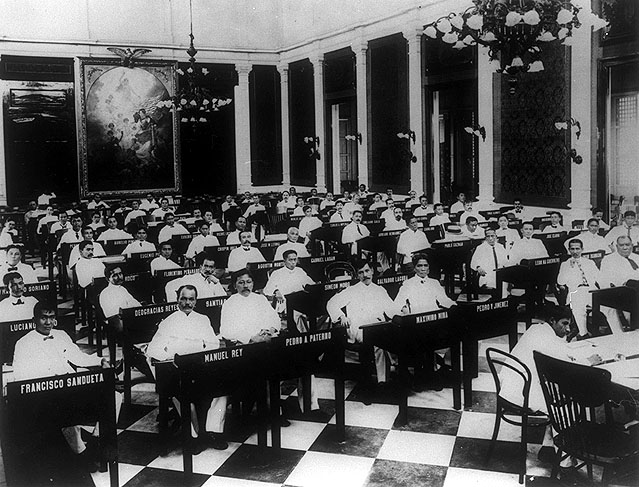
Philippine Legislature before 1924

The Philippine Legislature was the legislature of the Philippines from 1907 to 1935, during the American colonial period, and predecessor of the current Congress of the Philippines. It was bicameral and the legislative branch of the Insular Government.

From 1907 to 1916, under the Philippine Organic Act of 1902, the legislature's lower house was the elected Philippine Assembly and its upper house was the appointed Philippine Commission, headed by the American governor general (who also served as the executive of the Insular Government).

In 1916, the Jones Law abolished the Philippine Commission and reorganized the Philippine Legislature as a fully elected, bicameral legislature composed of the Senate and House of Representatives, precursors to current Senate of the Philippines and House of Representatives of the Philippines.

In 1935, the Commonwealth of the Philippines was established and the National Assembly of the Philippines replaced the Philippine Legislature.

== History ==
=== Under the Philippine Organic Act (1907–1916) ===
The Philippine Organic Act of July 1902 stipulated that a Philippine legislature would be established after several conditions were met, such as the end of the "Philippine Insurrection". The legislature was to have an upper house consisting of the appointed Philippine Commission and a lower house, the Philippine Assembly, its members chosen by national election. The two houses would share legislative powers, although the upper house alone would pass laws relating to the Moros and other non-Christian peoples. Two Filipino resident commissioners were sent to Washington to attend sessions of the United States Congress. The act also extended the United States Bill of Rights to the Philippines.

The Philippine Legislature convened its first session on October 16, 1907, at the Manila Grand Opera House. Conflict between the bodies, the American-majority commission and the all-Filipino, Nacionalista-led assembly, were not uncommon. Such conflicts came to an end when the Jones Law created a bicameral legislature composed exclusively of Filipinos.

==== Philippine Commission (1900–1916) ====
The Second Philippine Commission, headed by William Howard Taft and known as the Taft Commission, was established by the President of the United States William McKinley in 1900 to exercise legislative and limited executive powers in the Philippines. Its members, both American and Filipino, were appointed by the US president. Beginning in 1907, it acted as the upper house of a bicameral legislature.

==== Philippine Assembly (1907–1916) ====
On July 30, 1907, the first elections for the Philippine Assembly were held. Two political groups dominated the elections—the Nacionalista Party and Nationalist Progressive Party. Minority parties and independent candidates also competed. The Nacionalista Party, which espoused "immediate and complete independence" was headed by future Philippine president Sergio Osmeña, captured a majority of the 80-seat assembly. The assembly was the first fully elected national legislative body.

=== Under the Jones Law (1916–35) ===
The Jones Law of 1916, also known as the Philippine Autonomy Act, changed the legislative arrangement. The Philippine Commission was abolished and replaced by the elected Senate of the Philippines. The Philippine Assembly was also reorganized and renamed the House of Representatives. In October 16, 1916, the new Philippine Legislature was inaugurated with Manuel L. Quezon as its first senate president and Sergio Osmeña as house speaker.

The Philippine Legislature was the country's legislative body until 1935 when it was superseded by the National Assembly of the Philippines upon the establishment of the Commonwealth of the Philippines.

== See also ==
- History of the Philippines (1898–1946)

== Sources ==
- Dolan, Ronald E., ed. (1993). Philippines: A Country Study (4th ed.). Washington, D.C.: GPO for the Library of Congress. ISBN 0-8444-0748-8.
- Zaide, Sonia M. (1994). The Philippines: A Unique Nation. Quezon City: All-Nations Publishing. ISBN 971-642-071-4.
