= Manuel Earnshaw =

Resident Commissioner of the Philippines from 1913 to 1917

The Honourable Manuel Earnshaw
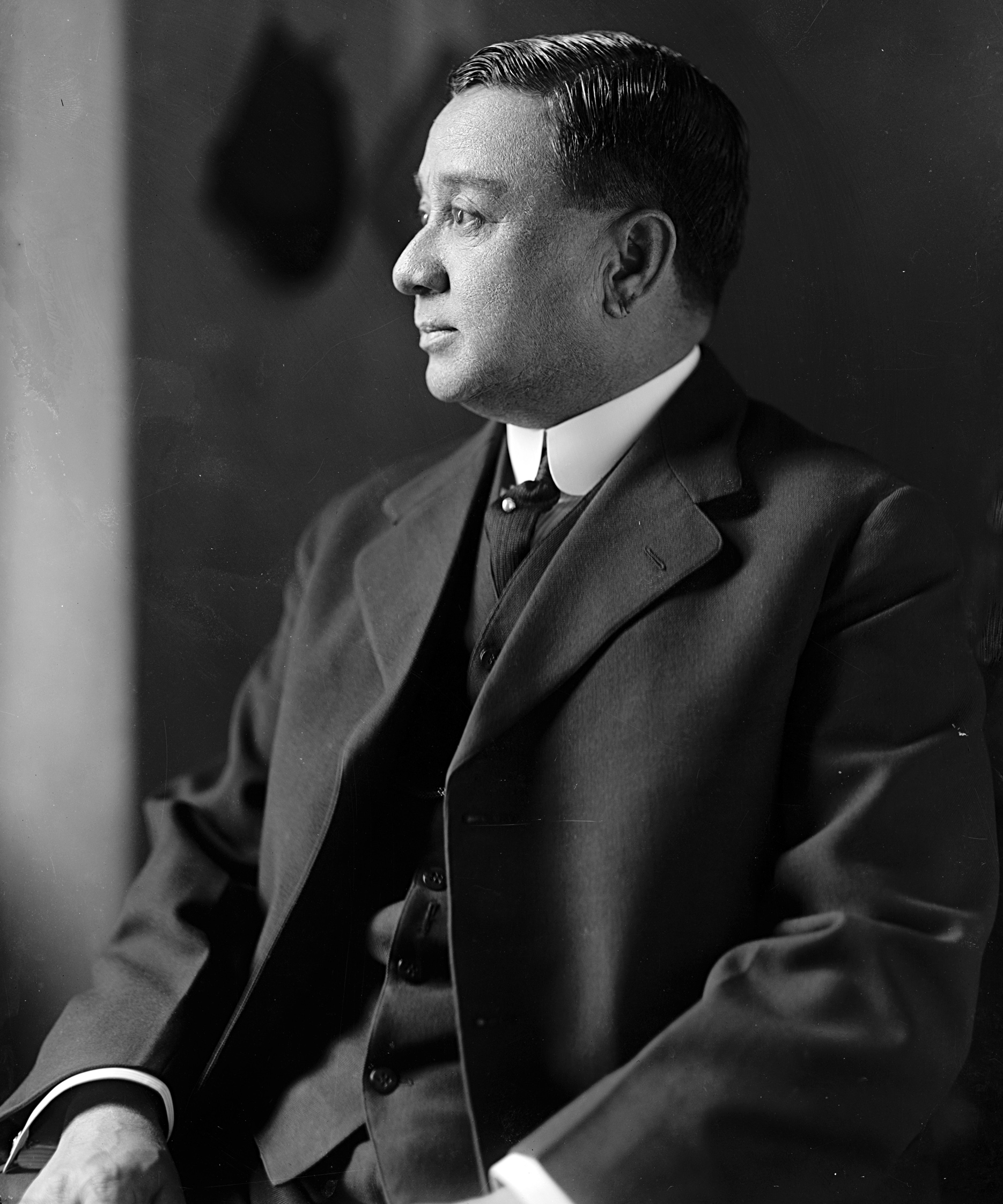

Resident Commissioner to the U.S. House of Representatives from the Philippine Islands
- In office March 4, 1913 – March 3, 1917 Serving with Manuel L. Quezon (1913–1917)
- Preceded by: Benito Legarda
- Succeeded by: Jaime C. de Veyra

Personal details
- Born: Manuel Noguera Earnshaw; November 19, 1862 Cavite, Captaincy General of the Philippines
- Died: February 13, 1936 (aged 73) Manila, Philippine Commonwealth
- Resting place: San Agustin Church, Intramuros, Manila, Philippines
- Spouse: Dona María Ubaldo
- Relations: Tomás Earnshaw (brother)
- Children: Ralph Earnshaw
- Education: Ateneo Municipal de Manila; Escuela Nautica de Manila

Manuel Noguera Earnshaw (November 19, 1862 – February 13, 1936) was a Resident Commissioner of the Philippines from 1913 to 1917.

== Early life and education ==
Earnshaw was born in Cavite, in then Captaincy General of the Philippines, on November 19, 1862, the oldest of three sons of British engineer Daniel Earnshaw and Spanish-Filipina mother Gavina Noguera, his younger brothers were Tomás and Daniel, He attended the Ateneo Municipal de Manila and Escuela Nautica de Manila.

== Early career ==
He became engaged in engineering and in the drydocking business in 1884. He was the founder, president, and general manager of the Earnshaw Slipways & Engineering Co.

== Resident Commissioner ==
Earnshaw was elected, as an Independent candidate, as Resident Commissioner from the Philippines and served from March 4, 1913, to March 3, 1917. He was not a candidate for renomination in 1916. He discontinued his former business pursuits in 1921 and lived in retirement in Cavite.

== Death ==
Earnshaw died in Manila, in then Commonwealth of the Philippines, February 13, 1936, and was buried in Manila North Cemetery. M. Earnshaw Street in Sampaloc, Manila, is named for him, whereas T. Earnshaw Street in Tondo is named for Tomás Earnshaw, a Manila mayor.

The remains of Manuel Earnshaw have been transferred to San Agustin Church in Manila.

== See also ==
- List of Asian Americans and Pacific Islands Americans in the United States Congress

U.S. House of Representatives
Preceded by Benito Legarda	Resident Commissioner from the Philippines to the United States Congress; 1913–1917; Served alongside: Manuel L. Quezon	Succeeded by Jaime C. de Veyra
