= Benito Legarda =

Filipino legislator

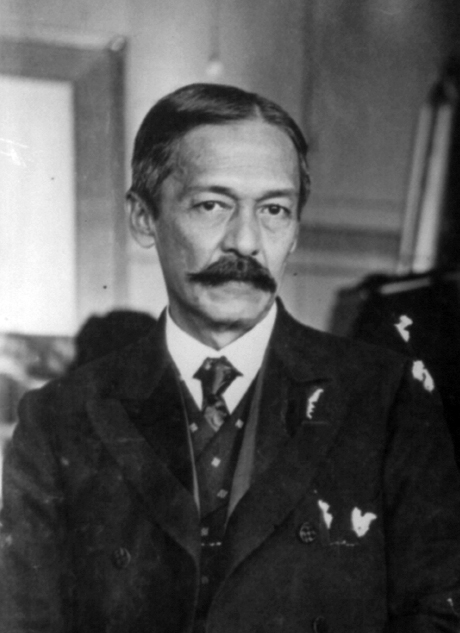
- Legarda in c. 1908

1st Resident Commissioner of the Philippines to the United States Congress
- In office November 22, 1907 – March 3, 1912 Serving with Pablo Ocampo (1907–1909); Manuel L. Quezon (1909–1912)
- Appointed by: William Howard Taft
- Preceded by: Position established
- Succeeded by: Manuel Earnshaw

Member of the Philippine Commission
- In office September 1, 1901 – December 21, 1907

Vice President of the Malolos Congress
- In office September 15, 1898 – November 13, 1899
- President: Pedro Paterno
- Preceded by: Position established
- Succeeded by: Position abolished (Antonio de las Alas as Speaker Pro Tempore of the Philippine Assembly)

Member of the Malolos Congress
- In office September 15, 1898 – November 13, 1899
- Constituency: Jolo

Personal details
- Born: Benito Cosmé Legarda y Tuason; September 27, 1853 Manila, Captaincy General of the Philippines
- Died: August 27, 1915 (aged 61) Évian-les-Bains, France
- Resting place: Manila North Cemetery
- Party: Progresista (1907–1915); Federalista (1900–1907); Independent (1898–1900)
- Other political affiliations: Republican (1907–1912)
- Spouse: Teresa de la Paz y de los Santos
- Education: University of Santo Tomas

Benito Cosmé Legarda y Tuason (September 27, 1853 – August 27, 1915) was a Filipino legislator who was a member of the Philippine Commission of the American colonial Insular Government, the government's legislature, and later a Resident Commissioner from the Philippine Islands to the United States Congress.

== Early life and education ==
He was born in Manila, Philippines on September 27, 1853 to a Spanish-Filipino and Chinese mestizo family. He attended the Jesuits' College and the University of Santo Tomas of Manila.

== Political career ==
He started his political life as a member of President Emilio Aguinaldo's cabinet at Malolos and vice president of the Malolos Congress. He later became a member of the Philippine Commission in 1901 and was elected as a Resident Commissioner to the Sixtieth and to the two succeeding Congresses (November 22, 1907 - March 3, 1912). He was not a candidate for renomination to the Sixty-third Congress in 1912, in large part due to opposition to his candidacy from the Philippine Assembly. He founded the Federalista Party in the early part of the 20th century. He was an upper-class Filipino who cooperated with the United States.

== Death ==
Benito Legarda died on August 27, 1915, in Evian-les-Bains, France. He is buried at the Manila North Cemetery.

== Legacy ==
The Legarda Elementary School and Legarda Street in Manila were named in Legarda's honor.

== See also ==
- List of Asian Americans and Pacific Islands Americans in the United States Congress
- List of Hispanic Americans in the United States Congress

U.S. House of Representatives
New seat	Resident Commissioner from the Philippines to the United States Congress; 1907–1912; Served alongside: Pablo Ocampo and Manuel L. Quezon	Succeeded by Manuel Earnshaw
