= Resident Commissioner of the Philippines =

Representative of the Philippines to the US Congress (1907–1946)

Resident Commissioner of the Philippine Islands

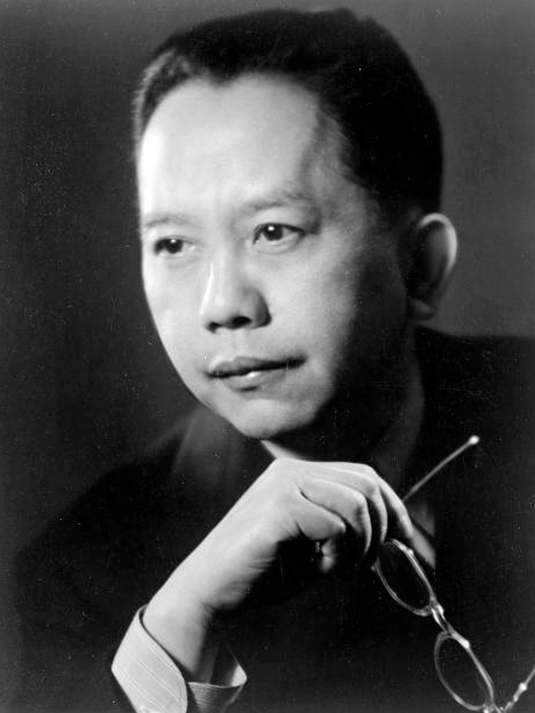
- Carlos P. Romulo; Last Resident Commissioner of the Philippines
- United States House of Representatives
- Seat: Philippines
- Formation: November 22, 1907
- First holder: Benito Legarda; Pablo Ocampo
- Final holder: Carlos P. Romulo
- Abolished: July 4, 1946

The resident commissioner of the Philippine Islands to the United States (Spanish: Comisario Residente de las Islas Filipinas a Estados Unidos) was a non-voting member of the United States House of Representatives sent by the Philippines from 1907 until its internationally recognized independence in 1946. It was similar to current non-voting members of Congress such as the resident commissioner of Puerto Rico and delegates from Washington, D.C., Guam, the Northern Mariana Islands and other territories of the United States.

Like current non-voting members, resident commissioners could speak and otherwise participate in the business of the House, but did not have full voting rights. Two resident commissioners were sent until 1937, when after the establishment of the Commonwealth of the Philippines, the number was changed to one.

== History ==
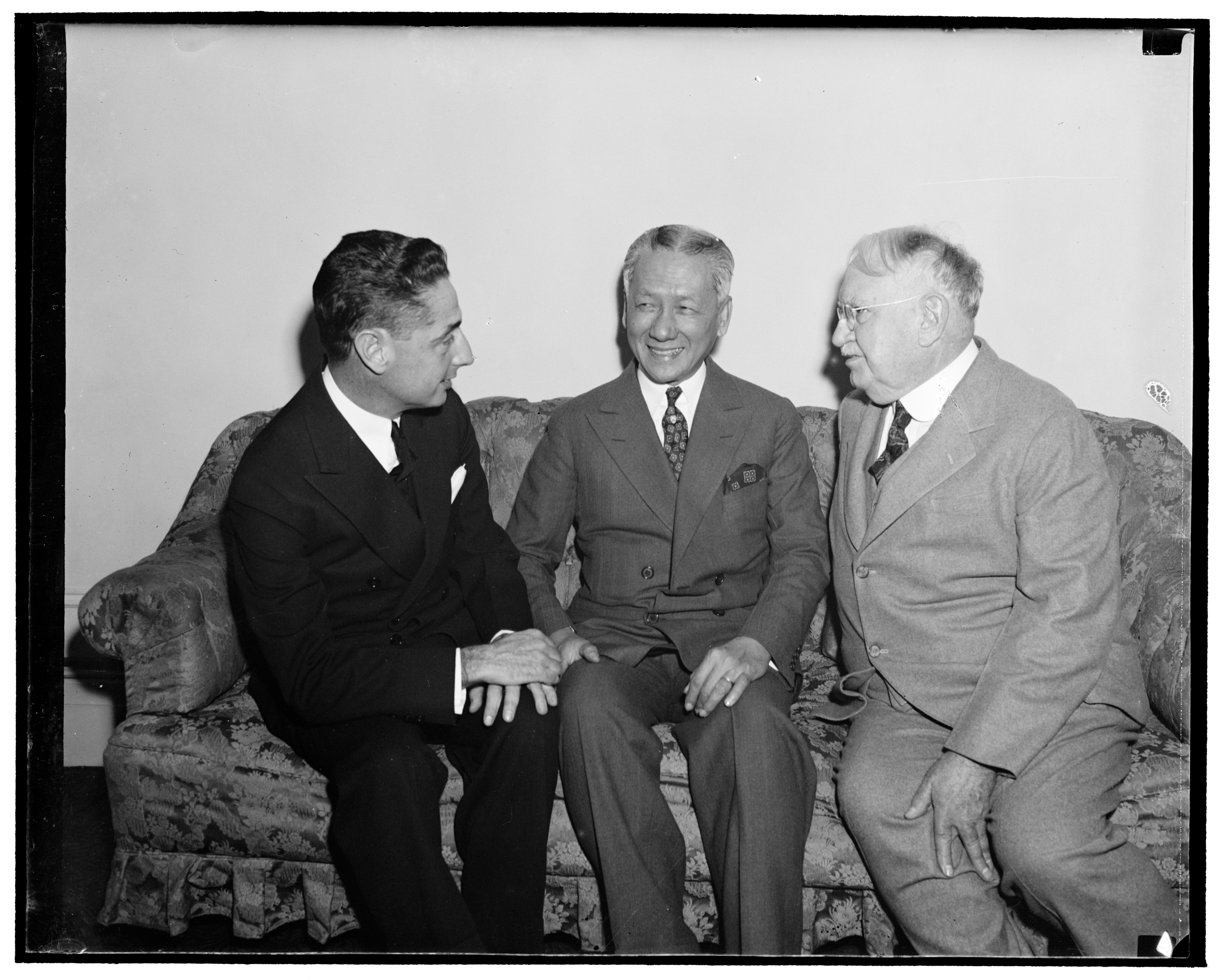
Philippine Commissioner J.M. Elizalde with future Philippine president Sergio Osmena and John W. Hausermann, (a Republican Party leader and goldmine owner in the Philippines), in 1938 or 1939, Library of Congress

The Philippines was a United States territory from 13 August 1898 until Philippine independence was internationally recognized on 4 July 1946.

The office was first created by the Philippine Organic Act of 1902, section 8 and re-authorized on its subsequent replacements—the Jones Law of 1916 (known as the Philippine Autonomy Act) section 20, and the Tydings–McDuffie Act of 1934 (known as the Philippine Independence Act) section 7(5).

== Election ==
The procedures for appointment of the resident commissioners were ambiguous and a source of friction. Under the Philippine Organic Act of 1902, the two resident commissioners were to be elected by the Philippine Legislature, with each chamber (the entirely-appointed, American-majority Philippine Commission and the fully-elected and all-Filipino Philippine Assembly) voting separately. The resident commissioners were to be elected biennially from the time of the first meeting of the Philippine Legislature in 1907. Benito Legarda and Pablo Ocampo became the first two resident commissioners.

Upon the passage of the Jones Law in 1916, the resident commissioners were still selected in the same way, but by this time now had three-year terms. Jaime C. de Veyra and Teodoro R. Yangco were the first resident commissioners under the Jones Law.

The Tydings–McDuffie Act of 1934 reduced the number of resident commissioners to one, and ordered the enactment of a new constitution. Upon the passage of the 1935 Constitution, it tasked the National Assembly (the successor of the Philippine Legislature) to legislate how the resident commissioner shall be selected. The National Assembly enacted Commonwealth Act No. 10 late in 1935, which stated how the next resident commissioner shall be selected; it stated that the resident commissioner would now be appointed by the president of the Commonwealth of the Philippines with the consent of the Commission on Appointments. and that the resident commissioner holds office at the pleasure of the president, therefore there was no fixed term.

The two resident commissioners serving under the Jones Law, Pedro Guevara and Francisco Afan Delgado, were replaced when President Manuel L. Quezon appointed Quintin Paredes as their successor in February 1936.

The resident commissioner was never elected via direct election unlike its Puerto Rican counterpart.

== List of resident commissioners ==
=== Insular government era: 1907–1936 ===
Seat A			Years	U.S. Congress	Philippine Legislature	Seat B		
Resident commissioner	Party	Electoral history	Years	U.S. Congress	Philippine Legislature	Resident commissioner	Party	Electoral history
Benito Legarda (Manila)	Federalista (Republican)	Elected in 1907. Re-elected in 1909. Retired in 1912.	November 22, 1907 – March 3, 1909	60th	1st	Pablo Ocampo (Manila)	Democratic	Elected in 1907. Retired in 1909 to run in the Philippine Assembly.
Benito Legarda (Manila)	Federalista (Republican)	Elected in 1907. Re-elected in 1909. Retired in 1912.	March 4, 1909 – November 22, 1909	61st	1st	Pablo Ocampo (Manila)	Democratic	Elected in 1907. Retired in 1909 to run in the Philippine Assembly.
Benito Legarda (Manila)	Federalista (Republican)	Elected in 1907. Re-elected in 1909. Retired in 1912.	March 4, 1909 – November 22, 1909	61st	2nd	Pablo Ocampo (Manila)	Democratic	Elected in 1907. Retired in 1909 to run in the Philippine Assembly.
Benito Legarda (Manila)	Federalista (Republican)	Elected in 1907. Re-elected in 1909. Retired in 1912.	November 23, 1909 – March 3, 1912	61st	2nd	Manuel L. Quezon (Tayabas)	Nacionalista	Elected in 1909. Re-elected in 1912. Retired in 1916 to run in the Philippine Senate.
Benito Legarda (Manila)	Federalista (Republican)	Elected in 1907. Re-elected in 1909. Retired in 1912.	November 23, 1909 – March 3, 1912	62nd	2nd	Manuel L. Quezon (Tayabas)	Nacionalista	Elected in 1909. Re-elected in 1912. Retired in 1916 to run in the Philippine Senate.
Benito Legarda (Manila)	Federalista (Republican)	Elected in 1907. Re-elected in 1909. Retired in 1912.	March 4, 1912 – March 3, 1913	62nd	2nd	Manuel L. Quezon (Tayabas)	Nacionalista	Elected in 1909. Re-elected in 1912. Retired in 1916 to run in the Philippine Senate.
Vacant			March 4, 1912 – March 3, 1913	62nd	3rd	Manuel L. Quezon (Tayabas)	Nacionalista	Elected in 1909. Re-elected in 1912. Retired in 1916 to run in the Philippine Senate.
Manuel Earnshaw (Manila)	Nonpartisan	Elected in 1913. Retired in 1916.	March 4, 1913 – March 3, 1915	63rd	3rd	Manuel L. Quezon (Tayabas)	Nacionalista	Elected in 1909. Re-elected in 1912. Retired in 1916 to run in the Philippine Senate.
Manuel Earnshaw (Manila)	Nonpartisan	Elected in 1913. Retired in 1916.	March 4, 1915 – October 15, 1916	64th	3rd	Manuel L. Quezon (Tayabas)	Nacionalista	Elected in 1909. Re-elected in 1912. Retired in 1916 to run in the Philippine Senate.
Jaime C. de Veyra (Manila)	Nacionalista	Elected in 1917. Re-elected in 1920. Retired in 1923.	March 4, 1915 – October 15, 1916	64th	4th	Manuel L. Quezon (Tayabas)	Nacionalista	Elected in 1909. Re-elected in 1912. Retired in 1916 to run in the Philippine Senate.
Jaime C. de Veyra (Manila)	Nacionalista	Elected in 1917. Re-elected in 1920. Retired in 1923.	October 16, 1916 – March 3, 1917	64th	4th	Vacant		
Jaime C. de Veyra (Manila)	Nacionalista	Elected in 1917. Re-elected in 1920. Retired in 1923.	March 4, 1917 – March 3, 1919	65th	4th	Teodoro R. Yangco (Zambales)	Nonpartisan	Elected in 1917. Retired in 1920.
Jaime C. de Veyra (Manila)	Nacionalista	Elected in 1917. Re-elected in 1920. Retired in 1923.	March 4, 1919 – March 3, 1920	66th	4th	Teodoro R. Yangco (Zambales)	Nonpartisan	Elected in 1917. Retired in 1920.
Jaime C. de Veyra (Manila)	Nacionalista	Elected in 1917. Re-elected in 1920. Retired in 1923.	March 4, 1919 – March 3, 1920	66th	5th	Isauro Gabaldón (Nueva Ecija)	Nacionalista	Elected in 1920. Re-elected in 1923. Re-elected in 1926. Resigned in 1928 to run in the Philippine House of Representatives.
Jaime C. de Veyra (Manila)	Nacionalista	Elected in 1917. Re-elected in 1920. Retired in 1923.	March 4, 1920 – March 3, 1921	66th	5th	Isauro Gabaldón (Nueva Ecija)	Nacionalista	Elected in 1920. Re-elected in 1923. Re-elected in 1926. Resigned in 1928 to run in the Philippine House of Representatives.
Jaime C. de Veyra (Manila)	Nacionalista	Elected in 1917. Re-elected in 1920. Retired in 1923.	March 4, 1921 – March 3, 1923	67th	5th	Isauro Gabaldón (Nueva Ecija)	Nacionalista	Elected in 1920. Re-elected in 1923. Re-elected in 1926. Resigned in 1928 to run in the Philippine House of Representatives.
Jaime C. de Veyra (Manila)	Nacionalista	Elected in 1917. Re-elected in 1920. Retired in 1923.	March 4, 1921 – March 3, 1923	67th	6th	Isauro Gabaldón (Nueva Ecija)	Nacionalista	Elected in 1920. Re-elected in 1923. Re-elected in 1926. Resigned in 1928 to run in the Philippine House of Representatives.
Pedro Guevara (Laguna)	Nacionalista	Elected in 1923. Re-elected in 1926. Re-elected in 1929. Re-elected in 1932. Retired in 1936 after change of form of government.	March 4, 1923 – March 3, 1925	68th	6th	Isauro Gabaldón (Nueva Ecija)	Nacionalista	Elected in 1920. Re-elected in 1923. Re-elected in 1926. Resigned in 1928 to run in the Philippine House of Representatives.
Pedro Guevara (Laguna)	Nacionalista	Elected in 1923. Re-elected in 1926. Re-elected in 1929. Re-elected in 1932. Retired in 1936 after change of form of government.	March 4, 1925 – March 3, 1927	69th	6th	Isauro Gabaldón (Nueva Ecija)	Nacionalista	Elected in 1920. Re-elected in 1923. Re-elected in 1926. Resigned in 1928 to run in the Philippine House of Representatives.
Pedro Guevara (Laguna)	Nacionalista	Elected in 1923. Re-elected in 1926. Re-elected in 1929. Re-elected in 1932. Retired in 1936 after change of form of government.	March 4, 1925 – March 3, 1927	69th	7th	Isauro Gabaldón (Nueva Ecija)	Nacionalista	Elected in 1920. Re-elected in 1923. Re-elected in 1926. Resigned in 1928 to run in the Philippine House of Representatives.
Pedro Guevara (Laguna)	Nacionalista	Elected in 1923. Re-elected in 1926. Re-elected in 1929. Re-elected in 1932. Retired in 1936 after change of form of government.	March 4, 1927 – July 16, 1928	70th	7th	Isauro Gabaldón (Nueva Ecija)	Nacionalista	Elected in 1920. Re-elected in 1923. Re-elected in 1926. Resigned in 1928 to run in the Philippine House of Representatives.
Pedro Guevara (Laguna)	Nacionalista	Elected in 1923. Re-elected in 1926. Re-elected in 1929. Re-elected in 1932. Retired in 1936 after change of form of government.	July 16, 1928 – March 3, 1929	70th	8th	Vacant		
Pedro Guevara (Laguna)	Nacionalista	Elected in 1923. Re-elected in 1926. Re-elected in 1929. Re-elected in 1932. Retired in 1936 after change of form of government.	March 4, 1929 – March 3, 1931	71st	8th	Camilo Osías (La Union)	Nacionalista	Elected in 1929. Re-elected in 1932. Retired in 1934 to run in the Philippine Senate.
Pedro Guevara (Laguna)	Nacionalista	Elected in 1923. Re-elected in 1926. Re-elected in 1929. Re-elected in 1932. Retired in 1936 after change of form of government.	March 4, 1931 – March 3, 1933	72nd	8th	Camilo Osías (La Union)	Nacionalista	Elected in 1929. Re-elected in 1932. Retired in 1934 to run in the Philippine Senate.
Pedro Guevara (Laguna)	Nacionalista	Elected in 1923. Re-elected in 1926. Re-elected in 1929. Re-elected in 1932. Retired in 1936 after change of form of government.	March 4, 1931 – March 3, 1933	72nd	9th	Camilo Osías (La Union)	Nacionalista	Elected in 1929. Re-elected in 1932. Retired in 1934 to run in the Philippine Senate.
Pedro Guevara (Laguna)	Nacionalista	Elected in 1923. Re-elected in 1926. Re-elected in 1929. Re-elected in 1932. Retired in 1936 after change of form of government.	March 4, 1933 – January 3, 1935	73rd	9th	Camilo Osías (La Union)	Nacionalista	Elected in 1929. Re-elected in 1932. Retired in 1934 to run in the Philippine Senate.
Pedro Guevara (Laguna)	Nacionalista	Elected in 1923. Re-elected in 1926. Re-elected in 1929. Re-elected in 1932. Retired in 1936 after change of form of government.	March 4, 1933 – January 3, 1935	73rd	10th	Camilo Osías (La Union)	Nacionalista	Elected in 1929. Re-elected in 1932. Retired in 1934 to run in the Philippine Senate.
Pedro Guevara (Laguna)	Nacionalista	Elected in 1923. Re-elected in 1926. Re-elected in 1929. Re-elected in 1932. Retired in 1936 after change of form of government.	January 3, 1935 – February 14, 1936	74th	10th	Francisco Afan Delgado (Bulacan)	Nacionalista	Elected in 1934. Retired in 1936 after change of form of government.

=== Commonwealth era: 1936–1946 ===
Resident commissioner	Party	Years	U.S. Congress	Philippine president	Appointive history
Quintín Paredes (Abra)	Nacionalista	February 14, 1936 – September 29, 1938	74th 75th	Manuel L. Quezon	Appointed in 1936. Resigned in 1938 to run in the Philippine National Assembly.
Joaquín Miguel Elizalde (Manila)	Nonpartisan	September 29, 1938 – August 9, 1944	76th 77th 78th	Manuel L. Quezon	Appointed in 1938. Resigned in 1944.
Joaquín Miguel Elizalde (Manila)	Nonpartisan	September 29, 1938 – August 9, 1944	76th 77th 78th	Sergio Osmeña	Appointed in 1938. Resigned in 1944.
Carlos P. Romulo (Manila)	Nacionalista	August 10, 1944 – July 4, 1946	78th 79th	Sergio Osmeña	Appointed in 1944. Office eliminated when the United States recognized the independence of the Republic of the Philippines in 1946.
Carlos P. Romulo (Manila)	Liberal	August 10, 1944 – July 4, 1946	78th 79th	Sergio Osmeña	Appointed in 1944. Office eliminated when the United States recognized the independence of the Republic of the Philippines in 1946.

== Philippines's at-large congressional district ==
Philippines's at-large congressional district
- Obsolete district
- Location of the Philippines (dark green) in the Asia-Pacific region
- Created: 1907, as a Resident Commissioner was granted by Congress
- Eliminated: 1946, as a result of independence of the Philippines
- Years active: 1907–1946

The resident commissioner represented the Philippines in the United States Congress.

== See also ==
- List of Asian Americans in the United States Congress
- List of Hispanic and Latino Americans in the United States Congress
- Resident Commissioner
- Representatives of the United States to the Philippines:
  - Governor-General of the Philippines from 1900 to 1935
  - High Commissioner to the Philippines from 1935 to 1946
  - List of ambassadors of the United States to the Philippines from 1946 to the present
- List of ambassadors of the Philippines to the United States, representative of the Philippines to the United States
