= South Park, San Francisco =

Park and neighborhood in San Francisco, California

South Park
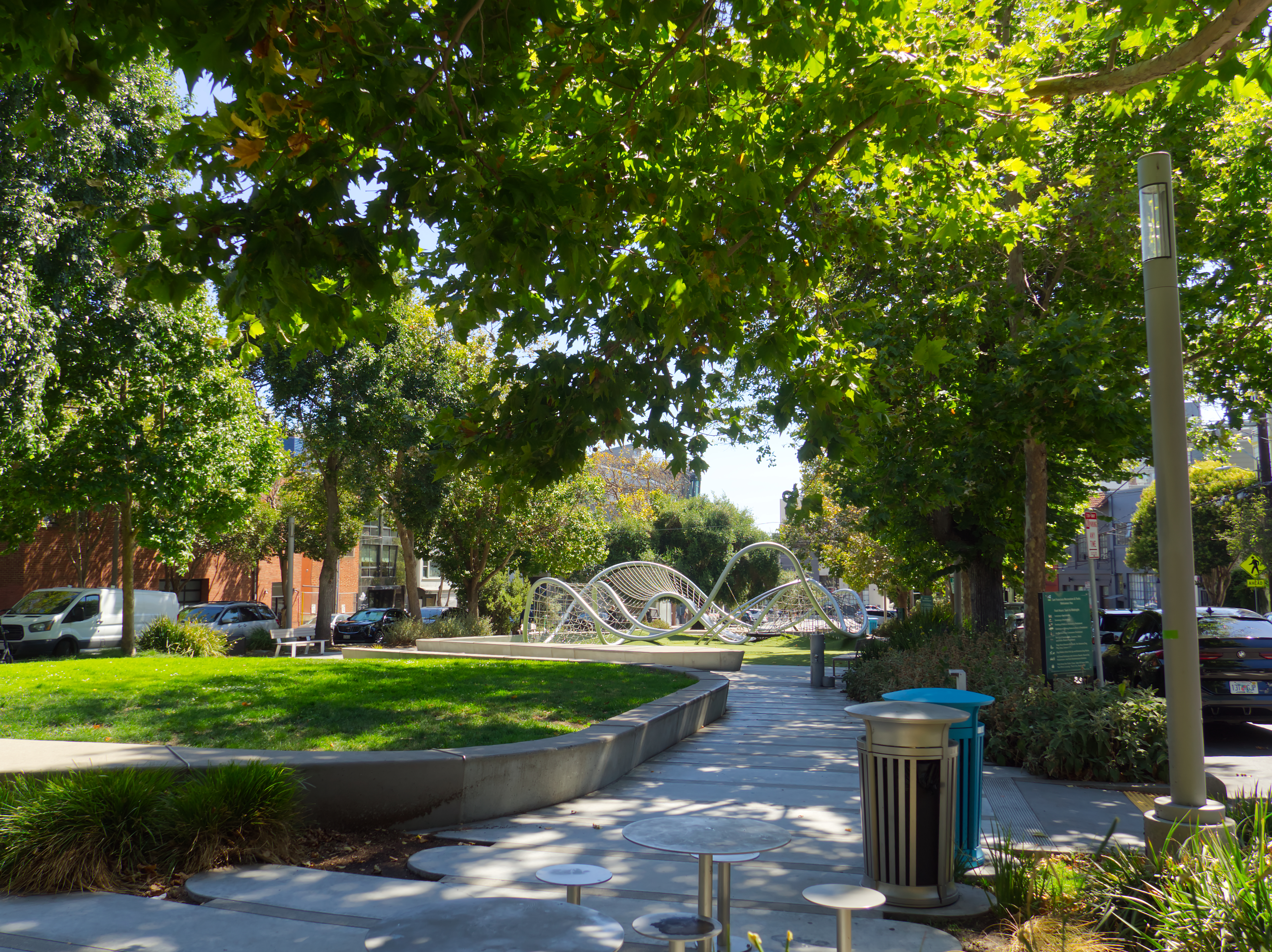
- Three and four story buildings surround the tree-filled South Park.
- Interactive map of South Park
- Type: Urban park (San Francisco)
- Location: San Francisco
- Coordinates: 37°46′53″N 122°23′38″W
- Area: 0.85 acres (0.34 ha)
- Created: 1852
- Open: All year
- Status: Open

South Park is a small urban park and eponymous neighborhood in the larger South of Market neighborhood of San Francisco, California, consisting of 0.85 acres (0.34 hectares) of public ground. The neighborhood centers on the small, oval-shaped park and South Park Street, which encircles the park. South Park is bounded by Second, Third, Bryant, and Brannan streets.

The two halves of the South Park Street re-join at both ends of the park and continue for short, straight stretches before terminating at Second Street on one end and Third Street on the other. This creates a curved line of buildings, which gives the street and park an unusual enclosed, urban character. Local businesses, restaurants, and apartment buildings dot the street.

== History ==
The South Park block was assembled in 1852 by the British-American entrepreneur George Gordon.

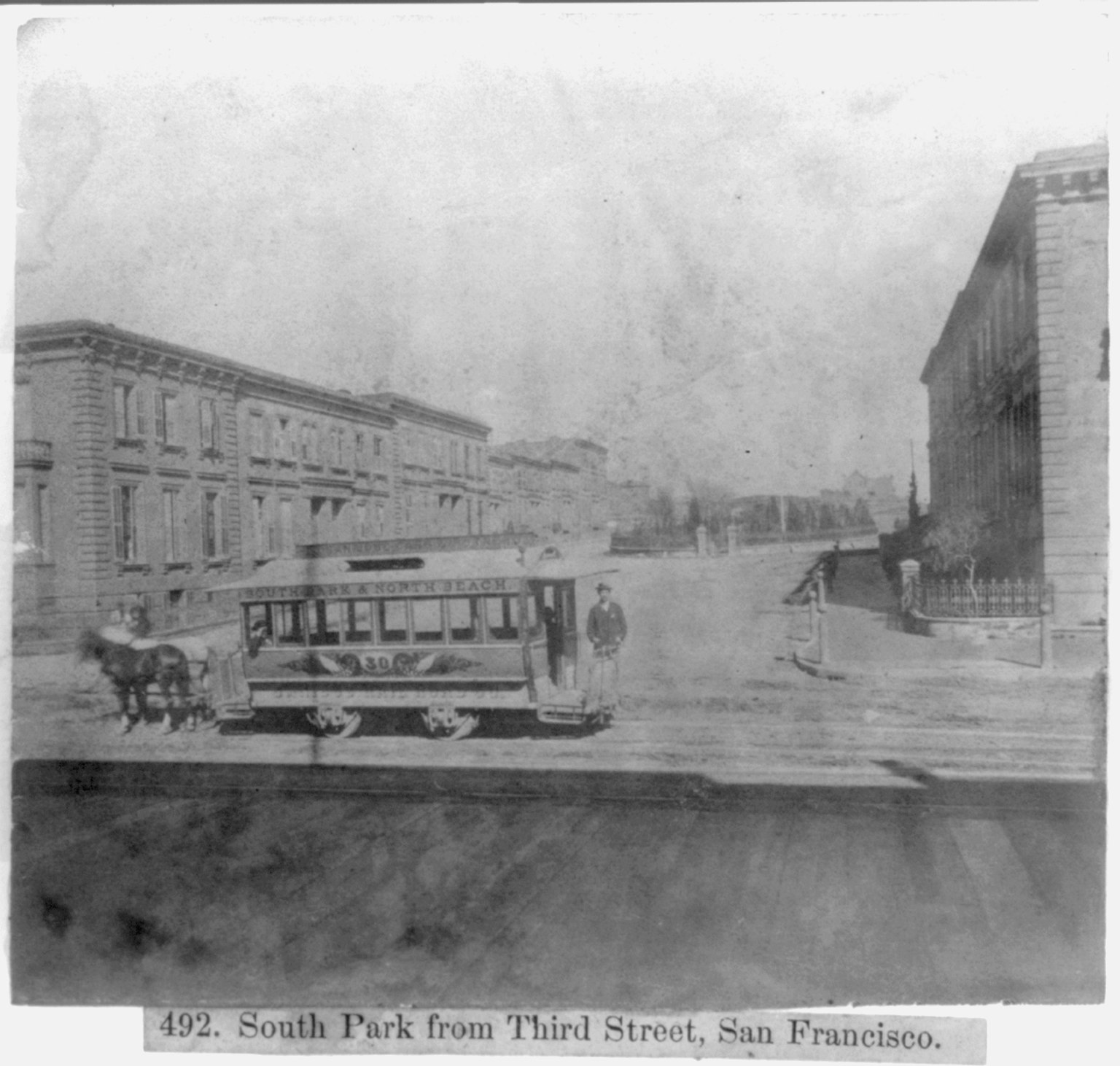
Looking north from 3rd Street in 1866

The park was originally constructed in 1855 as the center of an exclusive residential community. It was modeled after a square in London, England, as a housing development of seventeen mansions plus townhouses (a total of 58 residences) on a 550-foot oval around a private grassy park. It featured the first paved streets and sidewalks in San Francisco. A windmill in the center of the park pumped water for the houses.

On January 2, 1895, during the settlement movement era, the South Park Settlement at Number 15 South Park was established by the San Francisco Settlement Association. From the late 19th to the early 20th century, South Park was also the center of one of San Francisco's largest Japanese American communities. Sandwiched between the waterfront and the South Pacific Railroad terminus, the area featured Japanese owned and operated hostels, hotels, baths, and shops. Many of the structures remain: the Madrid Hotel occupies what once was the Eimoto Hotel at 22 South Park.

The neighborhood began to lose exclusivity after the construction of Second Street, which made the area accessible to less affluent residents. Rich residents moved to the newer Nob Hill neighborhood in the late 19th century, and the city took over the park in 1897. It suffered further decline after the San Francisco earthquake of 1906, when most of the homes around the Rincon Hill neighborhood were destroyed. The oval park, however, has remained unchanged and is still a central meeting place in the neighborhood. After the quake, the neighborhood was rebuilt as warehouses, light manufacturing, nightclubs, and hotels. Immigrants from various countries came to the neighborhood, as well as longshoremen, drug addicts, and vagrants. The neighborhood began to attract artists and young professionals beginning in the 1970s.

The area flourished during the dot-com boom of the late 1990s, due to flexible office space at initially low rent. It was sometimes described as "ground zero" of the dot com revolution, with many start-up Internet companies based in the area. By late 2001, however, many of these companies had closed their doors. But by 2006, in an era for the Internet that some dubbed Web 2.0, South Park once again became home to many small Web-related companies.

In 2005, the San Francisco Municipal Transportation Agency proposed to put an above-ground stop on the Central Subway at the southwestern end of South Park Street, on Third Street. By 2008, after opposition to the proposal by South Park residents, the routing of the line was moved to Fourth Street, one block to the west.

In January 2016, South Park was closed temporarily in order to undergo a $2.8 million renovation, which included comprehensive infrastructural and cosmetic upgrades. The renovation was completed and the park reopened in March 2017.

== South Park businesses ==
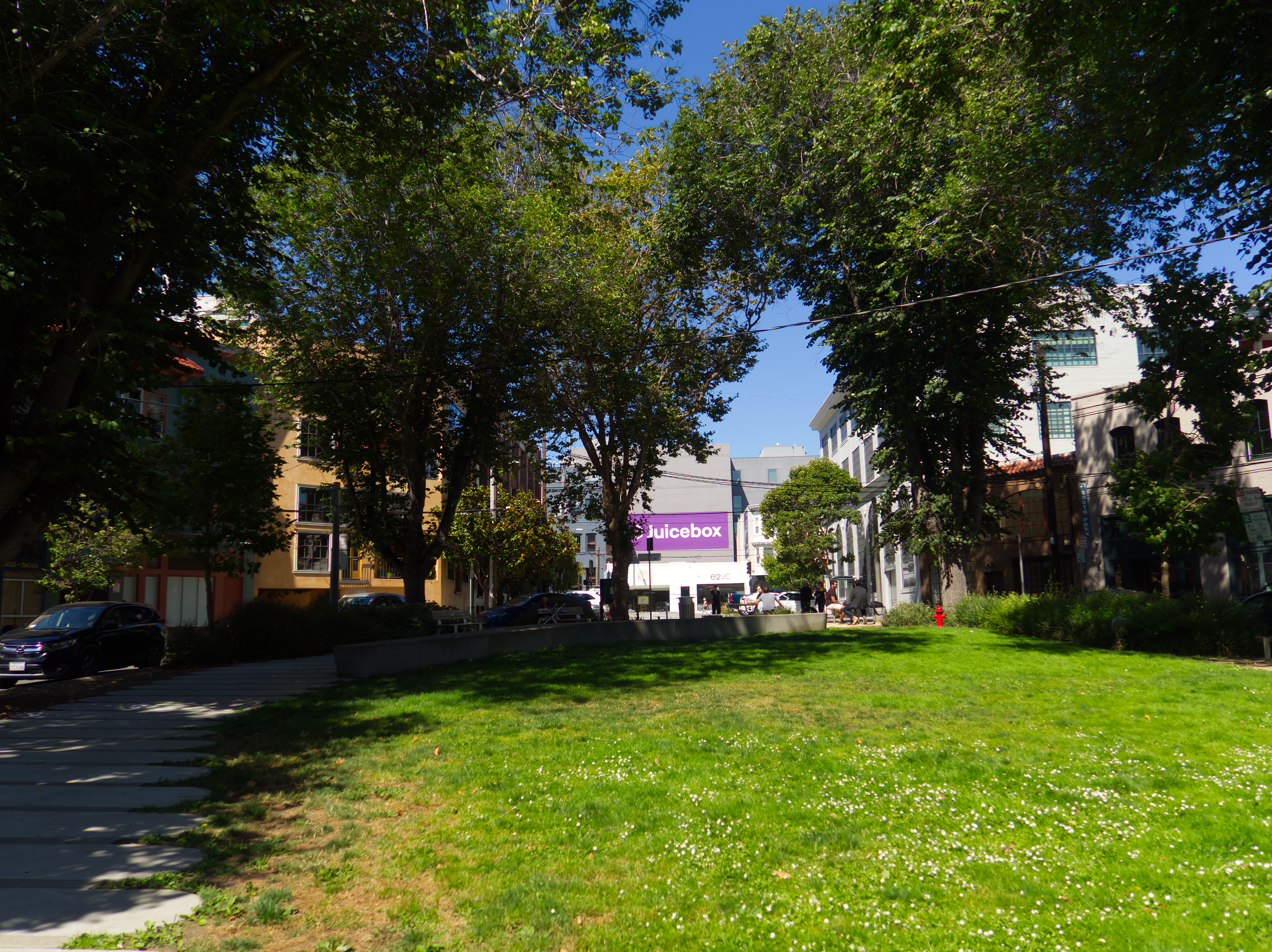
A view of South Park in July 2026, facing northeast

=== Current ===
(as of January 2016)

==== Architecture, engineering and design ====
- Aidlin Darling Design
- Arcanum Architecture
- Blue Clover Devices
- CMG Landscape Architecture
- Fennie + Mehl Architects
- Levy Design Partners
- Mark Horton / Architecture
- Pfau Long Architecture
- Sand Studios
- Strandberg Engineering
- Valerio Dewalt Train Associates
- WRNS Studio
- Zack | de Vito Architecture + Construction
- zero ten design

==== Arts and culture ====
- Lamplighters Music Theatre, nonprofit music theater company
- Gallery 16, contemporary art gallery

==== Food and beverage ====
- Blue Bottle Coffee
- Caffe Centro, coffeehouse
- HRD, Asian fusion restaurant
- Small Foods, cafe and "grab and go" grocery store
- South Park Cafe

==== Media and web ====
- Alternet (Independent Media Institute), journalism website
- Apartment List
- Macworld
- PC World
- R/GA
- SFist
- Tendo Communications, marketing communications,
- Wired, tech magazine

==== Technology ====
- 1BOG, One Block Off the Grid, clean-tech solar
- AxleHire, integrated logistics provider
- Dropbox, web-based file hosting service
- Fantasy Interactive, full service digital agency
- Foxcove, IT Services Firm
- Flowcast, fintech company
- Grid Net, WiMAX based power meters
- TravelBank, travel expense management
- Tune, mobile marketing firm
- iOffer, Social marketplace
- Olark, live chat provider
- Okta, Internet identity and access management provider
- PlanetScale, a MySQL cloud database provider
- Presence, Digital Product (web, mobile, XR) development and strategy
- Prowl, music discovery
- Sauce Labs
- Slideshare.net, a slide hosting service
- Splunk, software company
- Strava, Athlete GPS tracking and analysis
- Rubicon Project, advertising automation
- Wcities

==== Venture capital ====
- Accel
- Coatue
- GGV Capital
- Genoa Ventures
- GV
- Kleiner Perkins
- Norwest Venture Partners
- Redpoint Ventures
- Singtel Innov8
- Vertex Ventures US

=== Former ===
- Adaptive Path, Web consulting
- Bigwords.com, used textbooks
- Cumulus Networks, creators of Cumulus Linux, a network operating system
- DigaCast, Digital Music.(recapitalized in 2008)
- Dipity, Web-based Digital Timelines
- Engine Yard, Platform as a Service
- frog design inc., design consultancy
- Fuseproject, product design and branding studio that designed new Mini, founded by Yves Behar
- FutureAdvisor, A digital investment advisor that optimizes all of your investment accounts automatically.
- Get Satisfaction, web-based customer support
- Grockit, Web-based collaborative learning platform
- Hummer Winblad, Venture Capital firm
- Lookout Mobile Security
- LookSmart, online advertising
- Lumosity, Brain fitness
- Mashape, Cloud API Hub
- Mule Design Studio, Web design
- Obvious Corp., blog-related company, acquired by Odeo.
- Odeo, podcasting
- Organic, Inc., formerly in same building as Wired Magazine.
- Quokka Sports, on-line sports coverage
- PeerSpace, short-term work space marketplace
- Podshow, podcasting
- Prismatic, social discovery,
- Rubyred Labs, Web applications
- Sherman Clay (Steinway distributorship), now rented out to dot com companies
- Socialcast, Enterprise social software developer
- Slide.com, Widget software maker (moved when acquired by Google)
- Sputnik Integrated, web design and development
- Technorati, blogging
- Twistage, video workflow
- Twitter, micro blogging
- VerticalResponse, direct marketing
- Wikimedia Foundation
- Xoom Corporation, money transfer
- YouNoodle, innovation data analytics company

== Neighbors ==
South Park is located between the San Francisco–Oakland Bay Bridge (Interstate 80) and Oracle Park, the city's baseball stadium. Many of the nearby streets are one-way, and many carry traffic to and from the bridge, the stadium, and Interstate 280, which terminates slightly to the south of the neighborhood.

Oracle Park (formerly Pacific Bell Park, then SBC Park, then AT&T Park), where the San Francisco Giants major league baseball team plays, is two blocks to the southeast of South Park.
