= Dorothea Rhodes Lummis Moore =

American physician, writer, and activist (1857–1942)

Dorothea Rhodes Lummis Moore M.D.
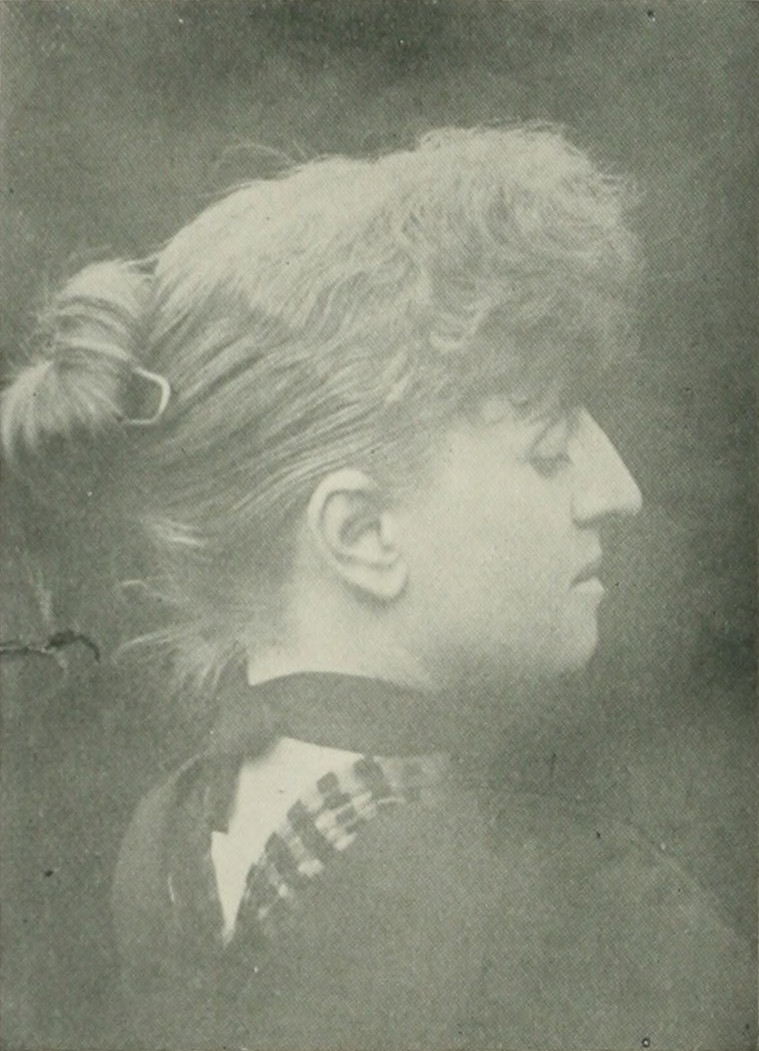
- "A Woman of the Century"
- Born: November 9, 1857; Chillicothe, Ohio, U.S.
- Died: March 4, 1942 (aged 84); California, U.S.
- Resting place: Forest Lawn Memorial Park, Glendale, California, U.S.
- Education: New England Conservatory of Music; Boston University School of Medicine
- Occupations: physician, writer, newspaper editor, activist
- Spouse(s): Charles Fletcher Lummis (m. 1880; div. 1891); Ernest Carroll Moore (m. 1896)

Dorothea Rhodes Lummis Moore (née, Rhodes; after first marriage, Lummis; after second marriage, Moore; November 9, 1857 – March 4, 1942) was an American physician, writer, newspaper editor, and activist. Although a successful student of music in the New England Conservatory of Music, in Boston, she entered the medical school of Boston University in 1881, and graduated with honors in 1884. In 1880, she married Charles Fletcher Lummis, and in 1885, moved to Los Angeles, California, where she began practicing medicine. She worked as dramatic editor, musical editor, and critic at the Los Angeles Times . She was instrumental in the formation of a humane society which was brought about through her observations of the neglect and cruelty to the children of the poor, and Mexican families, visited in her practice; and the establishment of the California system of juvenile courts.

Moore wrote for several prominent newspapers and magazines, including Puck, Judge, Life, Women's Cycle, San Francisco Argonaut, and The Californian, as well as various American medical journals. After divorcing Charles Lummis in 1891, she married Dr. Ernest Carroll Moore in 1896. She was a confidante of Charlotte Perkins Gilman and a life-long friend of Mary Austin.

== Early years and education ==
Mary Dorothea Rhodes was born in Chillicothe, Ohio on November 9, 1860. Her parents were Josiah H. Rhodes, of Pennsylvania Dutch ancestry, and Sarah Crosby Swift, of New England Puritan ancestry. Several brothers and a sister died in infancy. In 1868, the family moved to Portsmouth, Ohio.

Moore entered the Portsmouth Female College, and at the age of sixteen, graduated with a Bachelor of Arts degree and was the salutatorian of her class. Two years later, she went to Philadelphia, Pennsylvania, and entered Mme. Emma Seller's conservatory of music, where she studied for two years. During this time, she attended numerous concerts and operas, and read widely at the Public Library. Later she went to Boston, Massachusetts, and studied music under James O'Neil of the New England Conservatory of Music.

== Career ==
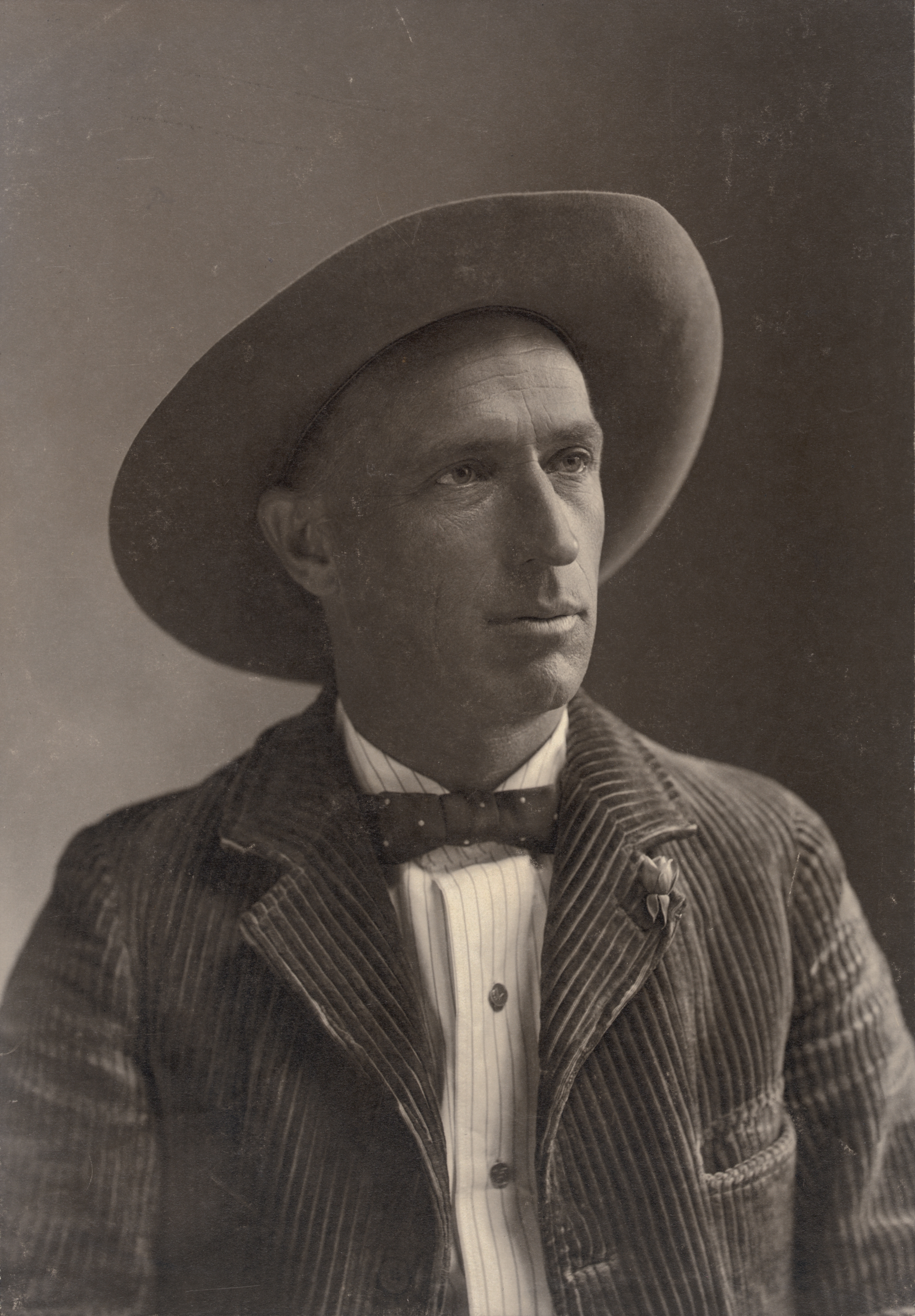
Charles Fletcher Lummis

On April 16, 1880, at Boston, she secretly married Charles Fletcher Lummis, who was then a student at Harvard University. In 1881, she entered Boston University School of Medicine, and graduated with honors in 1884. Charles Lummis had left Harvard due to poor grades and went to work for her parents in the Scioto River area of Ohio. Initially engaged in farming, he became a journalist on the Scioto Gazette before joining the Los Angeles Times in 1884.

During the last year of her college life, Moore served as resident physician in the New England Conservatory of Music. In 1885, she joined her husband in Los Angeles, where she began to practice medicine. She was successful in her practice, earning prompt recognition from her fellow physicians. She served as president and secretary of the Los Angeles County Medical Association, and as corresponding secretary of the Southern California Medical Society. In her practice, after encountering cases of cruelty and neglect among Mexican-American children and animals, she formed a humane society, and brought the cases to the courts.

Moore served as dramatic editor of the Los Angeles Times, and later, the musical editor and critic of that journal. She also did some notable literary work. She contributed to Kate Field's Washington, Puck, Judge, Life, Woman's Cycle, the Home-Maker, the San Francisco Argonaut and The Californian. She was a member of the Pacific Coast Women's Press Association, and contributed many important papers to the various medical journals of standing in the United States.

== Personal life ==
In 1891, Moore divorced Lummis.

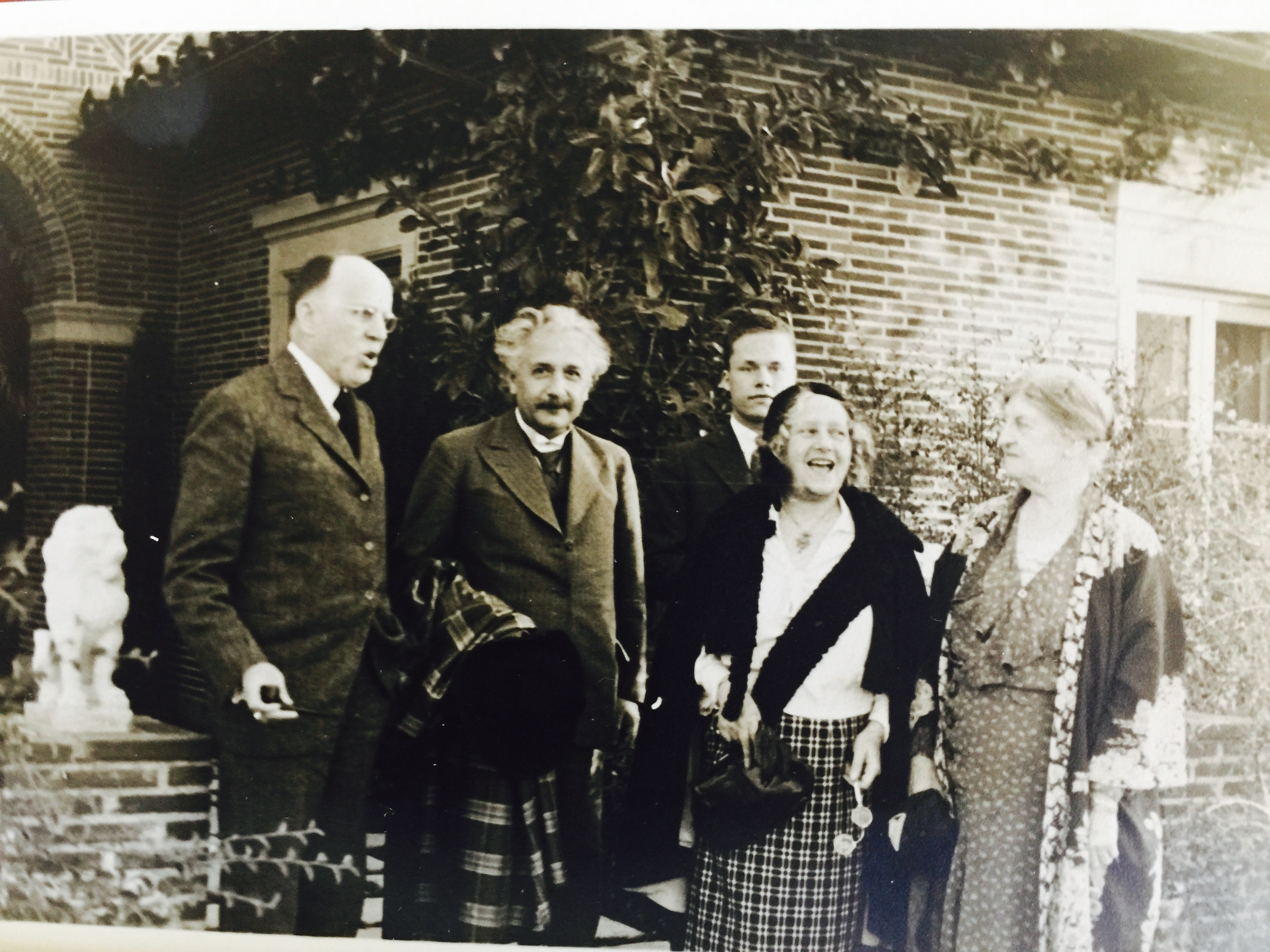
(from left) Dr. Ernest Moore, Dr. Albert Einstein, Elsa Einstein, Dr. Dorothea Moore, and unidentified person in background (circa February 1932, UCLA Chancellor Residence).

On February 17, 1896, she married Dr. Ernest Carroll Moore. Ernest had been a resident of Hull House during his student days in Chicago (1896–98), while Dorothea, ten years his senior, was a teacher there. During the period of 1898–1902, she served a Head Resident of South Park Settlement in San Francisco.

In her vacation tours, Moore visited many of the Native American pueblos in New Mexico, and made a collection of arrowheads, Navajo silver and blankets, Aconia pottery, baskets and other curios of that area. In 1911, she moved from Los Angeles to New Haven, Connecticut. June 26, 1912, Moore and Dr. Mary F. McCrillis, a homeopathic physician of Evanston, Illinois, sailed away for two months abroad. In 1913, she moved from New Haven to Cambridge, Massachusetts.

== Death and legacy ==
Moore was an invalid for several years before her death. She died March 4, 1942, in California, and was buried at Forest Lawn Memorial Park in Glendale, California. Her letters are held in the Dorothea Rhodes Lummis Moore Collection at the Huntington Library in San Marino, California.

British composer Clara Ross (1858-1954) used Moore’s text for her song “An Old Sorrow.”

== Selected works ==
- At Sunset
- A Neglected Mission
