= Edward Augustus Dickson =

American educator (1879–1956)

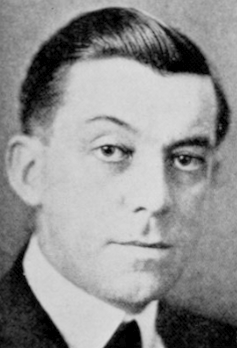
- Born: August 29, 1879; Sheboygan, Wisconsin, U.S.
- Died: February 22, 1956 (aged 76); Los Angeles, California, U.S.
- Burial place: Forest Lawn Memorial Park
- Education: University of California, Berkeley
- Occupation: Educator
- Political party: Republican
- Spouse: Wilhelmina de Wolff (m. 1907)

Edward Augustus Dickson (1879–1956) was an American journalist and politician. He served as a member of the Regents of the University of California for 43 years. In that capacity, he was a co-founder of the University of California, Los Angeles and earned the nickname "Godfather of UCLA".

== Biography ==
=== Early life ===
Edward Augustus Dickson was born in Sheboygan, Wisconsin, on August 29, 1879. When he was six years old, his father died and his mother moved with him and his older brother to Sacramento. He graduated from the University of California, Berkeley in 1901.

=== Career ===
He taught in Japan in 1901–1902. During his time in Japan, he drafted a thesis on education that he planned to submit for admission to a Master of Education program upon his return to the United States. Unfortunately, an accident while boarding a steamship home sent his trunk and his manuscript inside to the bottom of Yokohama harbor.

Back in California, Dickson turned to a career in journalism. He worked as a journalist for the Sacramento Record Union, the San Francisco Chronicle, and the Los Angeles Express. In 1919, he purchased the Los Angeles Express and became its editor.

Dickson co-founded the Lincoln–Roosevelt League, which helped elect Hiram Johnson as governor of California. In 1913, Johnson tried to return the favor by offering Dickson the position of chairman of the California Railroad Commission, one of the most powerful positions in the government of California. Johnson was astonished when Dickson refused to accept the appointment, and asked him, "What do you want, Dick?" Dickson replied: "The only appointment that interests me is that of regent."

On October 25, 1917, Dickson had lunch with Ernest Carroll Moore (1871–1955) at the Jonathan Club, a private member's club in Los Angeles. Together, they decided to establish the Southern Branch in Westwood, Los Angeles, which eventually became the new campus of UCLA. He served as a regent for 43 years, until his death in 1956. During his last eight years on the Board of Regents, he served as chair of the board.

He served as President of the Western Federal Savings and Loan Association from 1931 to 1956. He also sat on the board of directors of the Central Investment Corporation.

He was a member of the California Republican Party and served as a delegate to the 1932 Republican National Convention. He also served on the board of directors of the Olympic Games Association for the 1932 Summer Olympics in Los Angeles. Furthermore, he was involved with the Los Angeles Art Association, the Los Angeles County Art Institute and the UCLA Art Council. He was featured in Who's Who in America.

=== Personal life ===
He married Wilhelmina de Wolff in 1907.

=== Death ===
He died at Good Samaritan Hospital in Los Angeles on February 22, 1956, at the age of seventy-six, and was buried at Forest Lawn Memorial Park.

=== Legacy ===
After his death, UCLA honored Dickson by naming two of the largest open spaces on campus after him. UCLA's main campus quadrangle is known as Dickson Plaza. The area immediately to the east, including the entire open space between Perloff and Schoenberg Halls and a bridge over a now-filled arroyo, is known as Dickson Court.

== Bibliography ==
- Dickson, The University of California at Los Angeles: Its Origin and Formative Years (1955)
