= South Park Settlement =

American settlement in San Francisco

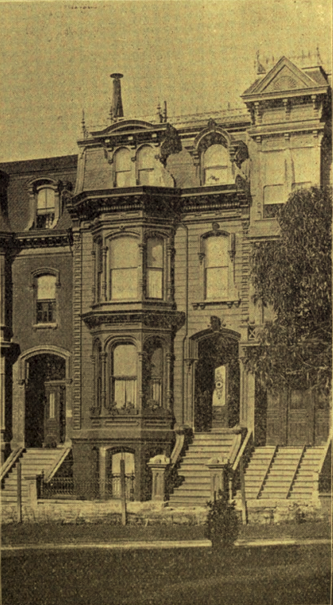
South Park Settlement (1897)

South Park Settlement was an American settlement movement-era settlement established in the South Park neighborhood of San Francisco, California on January 2, 1895, by the San Francisco Settlement Association (organized April 14, 1894, and incorporated). It was founded in one of the crowded districts of San Francisco. The pretty little oval park on which the Settlement House faces was formerly the fashionable residence district of the city. But within a few blocks on either side of South Park were many little streets, whose crowded tenements furnished homes for less prosperous working people. Its goals were to establish and maintain a settlement in San Francisco as a residence for persons interested in the social and moral condition of its neighborhood; to bring into friendly and helpful relations with one another the people of the neighborhood in which the settlement was situated; to cooperate with church, educational, charitable and labor organizations, and with other agencies acting for the improvement of social conditions; to serve as a medium among the different social elements of the city for bringing about a more intelligent and systematic understanding of their mutual obligations; as well as to do social and educational work in the neighborhood; co-operate in the civic work of the city; and investigate social and economic conditions.

Although this was a "social settlement", rather than a "university" or "college settlement", the proximity to San Francisco of the two universities, that the University of California at Berkeley and Stanford University at Palo Alto, brought to the settlement the inspiration of university life and the practical help of members of the teaching and student corps. The president, vice-president, and another member of the settlement countil were members of the university faculties, and several others were alumni.

By 1929, the settlement had ceased to exist, and the 2520 Folsom Street building was being used by the Mission Club Center of the YWCA.

== 1894 ==
In 1894, Jane Addams, of Hull House, Chicago, visited San Francisco, and as a result of the interest aroused by her, a committee was formed to consider the advisability of establishing a settlement in San Francisco. Shortly after, the organization was effected, the offer of an annuity for the work of the association, from Phoebe Hearst, enabled them to select a house. Later in the year, the San Francisco Settlement Association leased and fitted up the house at 15 South Park Street. The experiment to be tried, which began in January 1895, was modeled after the methods of the university settlement workers in the slums of large cities, and more particularly from the ideas of Addams, who work in the districts given over to the poor in Chicago were so successful. Dr. Haynes of the Department of Political Economy and History at the University of California had charge. Professor Bernard Moses was elected President of the association in November. At the time, the institution was being supported wholly by subscriptions from the public.

== South Park Street (1895–1906) ==
=== History ===
The South Park Settlement began work in January 1895 in a small way at 15 South Park Street. The beginning of the work of the settlement was centered in a kitchen garden, which was removed to the settlement house.

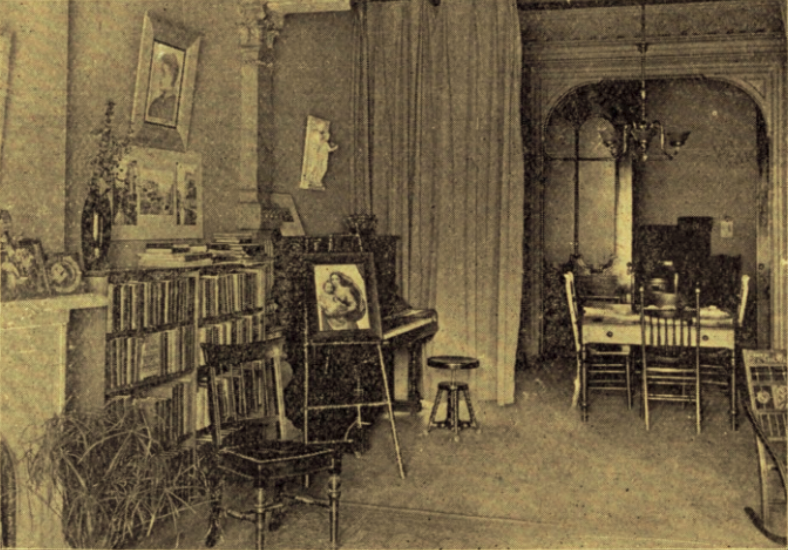
1897

In October, 1897, it moved to a larger house at 84 South Park Street. That house was an old-fashioned residence that had become a common tenement house. It contained thirteen rooms, and was four stories in height. There were six rooms which could be used for public purposes, and there was accommodation for six residents.

In 1900, the San Francisco Boys' Club was merged in the settlement. In March, 1901, Phoebe Hearst purchased and remodelled the two houses at 84–86 South Park Street, and added the Shaw gymnasium.

=== Neighborhood ===
South Park was an old-fashioned residence district far down town in the business-factory quarter. The community varied in condition from the prosperous business man and the poor but steadily employed workman to the waterfront contingent verging on destitution. The people were largely native born of American, Irish and German descent.

=== Architecture and fittings ===
The Settlement House and equipment were one of Hearst's many generous gifts to the people of California. The main building contained club rooms, shops, cooking and sewing departments, and quarters for ten residents. To the rear was an attractive little hall, with a seating capacity of about 400, which was used as a gymnasium, for lectures and concerts, and also for numerous and varied club entertainments.

=== Activities ===
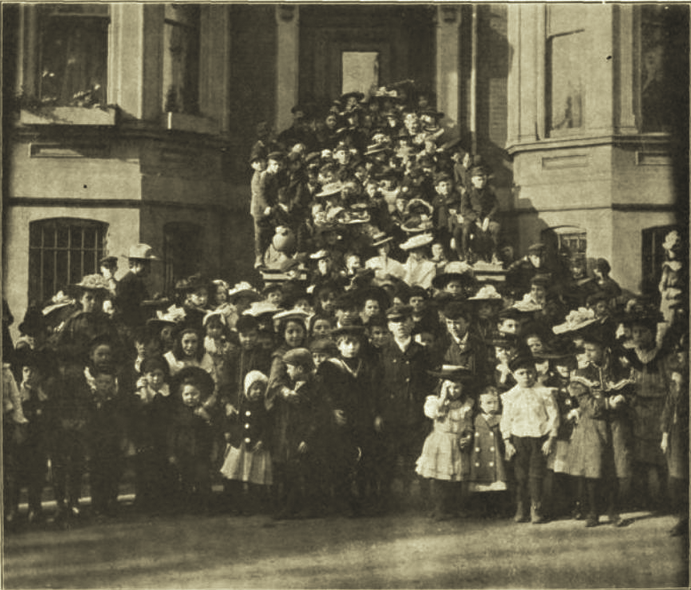
1903

The workers made various efforts for neighborhood and civic betterment; worked hard for a playground for the section; made investigations into school attendance; and were largely instrumental in preparing the way for an adequate child labor law, and for a better law covering the work of women. They carried on in cooperation with the University of California, Berkeley lectures on trade unionism.

The settlement maintained clubs of girls, boys, young men, women and older women. It provided instruction given in carpentry, printing, brushmaking, and Venetian ironwork for boys. There was gymnasium work for boys, girls and women. Other classes included dressmaking, millinery, plain sewing, embroidery and cooking, singing, literature, and economics. There were stereopticon ethical talks for the children on Sunday afternoon. Summer work included camps for women and girls and a boys' camp in the Fruit Belt picking fruit.

The fully organized clubs of the settlement contained about 350 members. With but few exceptions, these were drawn from the families of fairly prosperous American or Irish-American wage-earners. The Settlement workers had always aimed to furnish opportunity, suggestions and companionship, at the same time encouraging self-government and initiative on the part of club members. All the older clubs were entirely self-supporting, and some of them made large contributions to the support of the Settlement. Several had no directors, while in others the "worker" was merely the most active and helpful of the club members. The Settlement residents made no special effort to bring in club members. The young people of the neighborhood knew of the opportunities offered by the Settlement and the standards of conduct which it demanded. They were drawn into clubs by friends or presented themselves in more less completely organized groups, asking for a meeting place and direction. The number of clubs and their membership were limited only by the capacity of the house.

The Settlement workers did what they could to help the more general civic and economic development of the city. Many contributions were made to the local labor paper and meetings were arranged to enable the labor leaders and large employers or professional men to become better acquainted. The special civic work undertaken by the Settlement was the securing and enforcement of laws for the protection of children. For two years, the Settlement workers took the initiative in the efforts to secure an adequate child labor law.

== Treat Avenue (1906–11) ==
During the period of 1906 to 1911, the settlement was located at 720 Treat Avenue.

=== 1906 earthquake and fire ===
After the 1906 earthquake and fire, although the South Park house was only slightly damaged during the earthquake, it, with its equipment, was ultimately burned and the settlement workers in company with thousands of their homeless neighbors camped out in China Basin. Most of the residents and volunteer workers at once offered their services to the Relief Committee and for several months, assisted in the organization and distribution of relief. Miss Eaves, the head worker, returned from New York City, where she had been on leave of absence during the previous winter, and organized social and sewing centers. Dana Coolidge, with funds offered by Selah Chamberlain, established a brick cleaning camp at Palo Alto and gathered there the younger boys of the boys' clubs, who were able to earn considerably more than their own living, and many of whom for the first time contributed to the support of their families.

Although scattered over miles of devastated territory in camps and tents, many of the South Park neighbors reported themselves to the former residents of the house at relief stations, and demanded, first of all, the re-establishment of the settlement. One of the young men's clubs pitched its tents in front of the ruins of the old house, determined to stay there till it should be rebuilt.

But it appeared then, and time proved, that the region about South Park was probably to be a commercial district, and as many of the people had moved farther out, it was thought wise to re-establish the settlement work at 720 Treat Avenue and to await the development of city reconstruction before fixing upon a permanent location. With the money remaining from a small legacy and chiefly through the energy and enthusiasm of Jean Parker, the treasurer of the council, and of W. H. Hutton, in charge of the boys' club, a large, rough, cheap club house was quickly built and the work reorganized with a nucleus of old club members.

In spite of the loss in equipment by fire, the work rapidly grew to proportions as great as in South Park, and the possibilities for work to be done were great and far-reaching.

== Folsom Street (1911–) ==
In 1911, the settlement relocated to 2520 Folsom Street.

=== Neighborhood ===
The location was in the heart of The Mission district, the thickly populated residence district of the working classes of San Francisco, with outlying factories. The community varied from a few old wealthy families and prosperous businessmen to a shifting population in inadequate lodging houses and refugee shacks. The neighbors were largely native born, with a cosmopolitan minority.

=== Activities ===
The settlement had clubs for girls, women and boys. Instruction given in manual training and debating. There was a gymnasium and cross country walks, for boys; and German language, sewing, and embroidery classes for girls, as well as a gymnasium. Classes were offered in civics and social economics. There were prospective moving picture lectures on educational and historical subjects. Summer work included a camp for boys in Sonoma County, California picking berries. There were outings to Belmont, California for mothers and girls.

The recreational work of the settlement at 2520 Folsom Street was carried out by a large number of small clubs, gymnasium, folk dancing, and singing. These clubs were allowed to use the gymnasium for dances any evening. Each club had a social evening once a month, when refreshments were served. They had moving pictures, musical programme and dancing every Saturday evening.

== Notable people ==
- Bernard Moses (January–June, 1895)
- Dorothea Moore (1898–1902)
- Lucile Eaves (1902–1907)
- Mary Roberts Coolidge was a worker at the South Park Settlement in 1905–1906

== See also ==
- Settlement and community houses in the United States
