= Ernest Carroll Moore =

American educator (1871–1955)

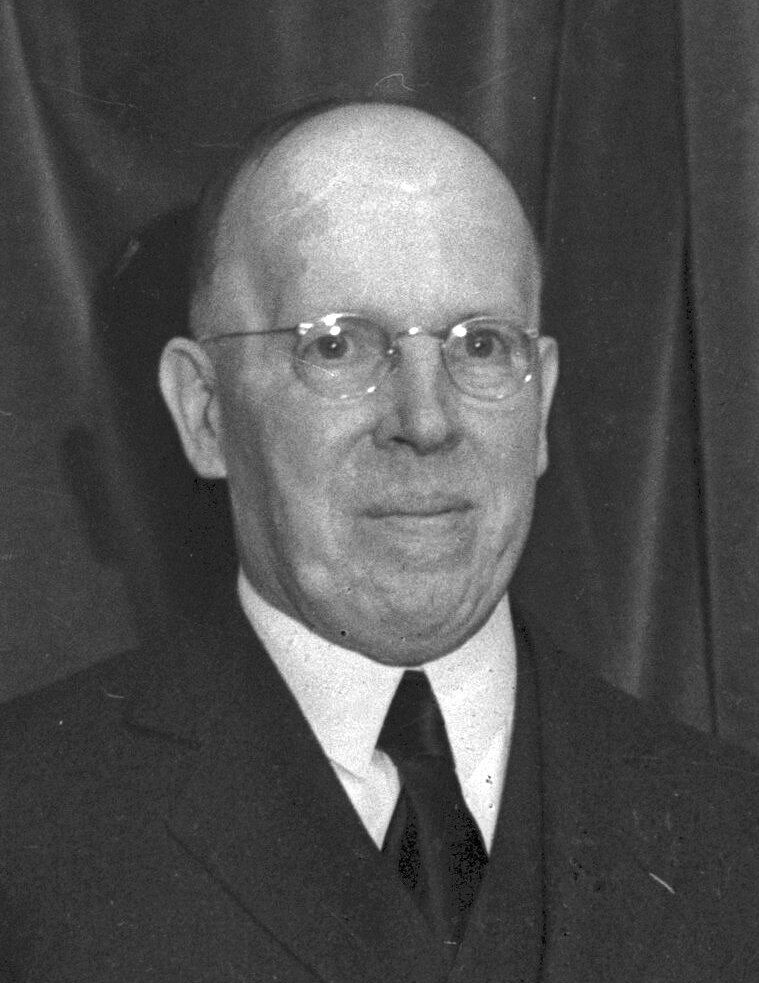
- Moore, c. 1936

1st Provost of the University of California, Los Angeles
- In office 1919–1936
- Succeeded by: Earle Raymond Hedrick

Personal details
- Born: 1871; Youngstown, Ohio
- Died: 3 January 1955 (aged 83); Los Angeles, California
- Spouse(s): Dr. Dorothea Rhodes Moore, Dr. Kate Gordon Moore
- Education: Ohio Normal University (LL.B); Columbia University (MA); University of Chicago (MA, PhD)
- Occupation: University Professor; University President

Ernest Carroll Moore (1871–1955) was an American educator. He co-founded the University of California, Southern Branch, in Los Angeles, California.

== Biography ==
=== Early life ===
Moore was born in 1871 in Youngstown, Ohio. He graduated from Ohio Normal University in 1892, where he also received an LL.B. in 1894. He then received a master's degree from Columbia University in 1898. He later received an M.A. and Ph.D. from the University of Chicago.

=== Career ===
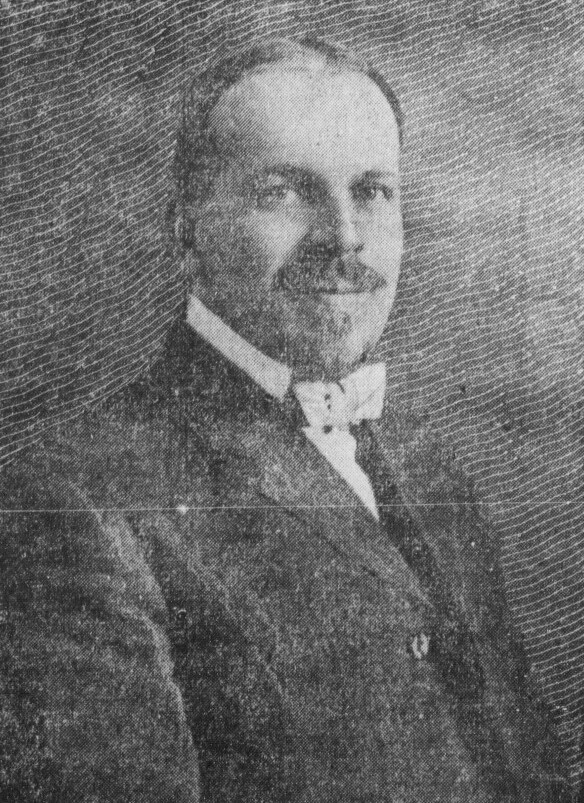
Moore in 1909.

While at university, he taught in grammar schools in Mississippi. He later taught at the University Settlement Society of New York and at Hull House in Chicago, where he worked with Jane Addams (1860–1935). He was a member of the California State Board of Charities and Corrections from 1903 to 1910.

He started his academic career as a professor of philosophy and education at the University of California, Berkeley, where he taught from 1898 to 1901. From 1901 to 1906, he was an instructor, followed by assistant professor of education, and in 1905, director of the summer sessions. From 1906 to 1910, he became superintendent of schools in Los Angeles. In 1910, he taught philosophy at Yale University. From 1913 to 1917, he taught philosophy at Harvard University.

A lifelong Hellenist, "he was wont eloquently and lovingly to read long passages from Aristotle or Plato; and once I chanced to pass his desk before he had closed his books (which he carried in a Harvard green bag). I was curious to see his translation because it varied slightly from the Jowett which I had been following as he read. It was not a translation, but the text in Greek! We had been hearing, without realizing it, a beautiful sight translation." Moore's influences included not only Greek philosophers such as Plato and Aristotle but contemporary American philosophers such as William James, Josiah Royce (for whom he named UCLA's Royce Hall) and John Dewey (under whom he studied at Chicago).

He served as president of the Los Angeles State Normal School from 1917 to 1919. In 1919, he was named president of its Southern Branch in Westwood, Los Angeles, which later became UCLA. Together with Edward Augustus Dickson (1879–1956), he paved the way for the creation of UCLA. He was a professor of education at UCLA from 1919 to 1929. He later served as vice president from 1929 to 1931, and as provost from 1931 to 1936. He stepped down as an administrator at UCLA in 1936, and taught until 1941, when he retired.

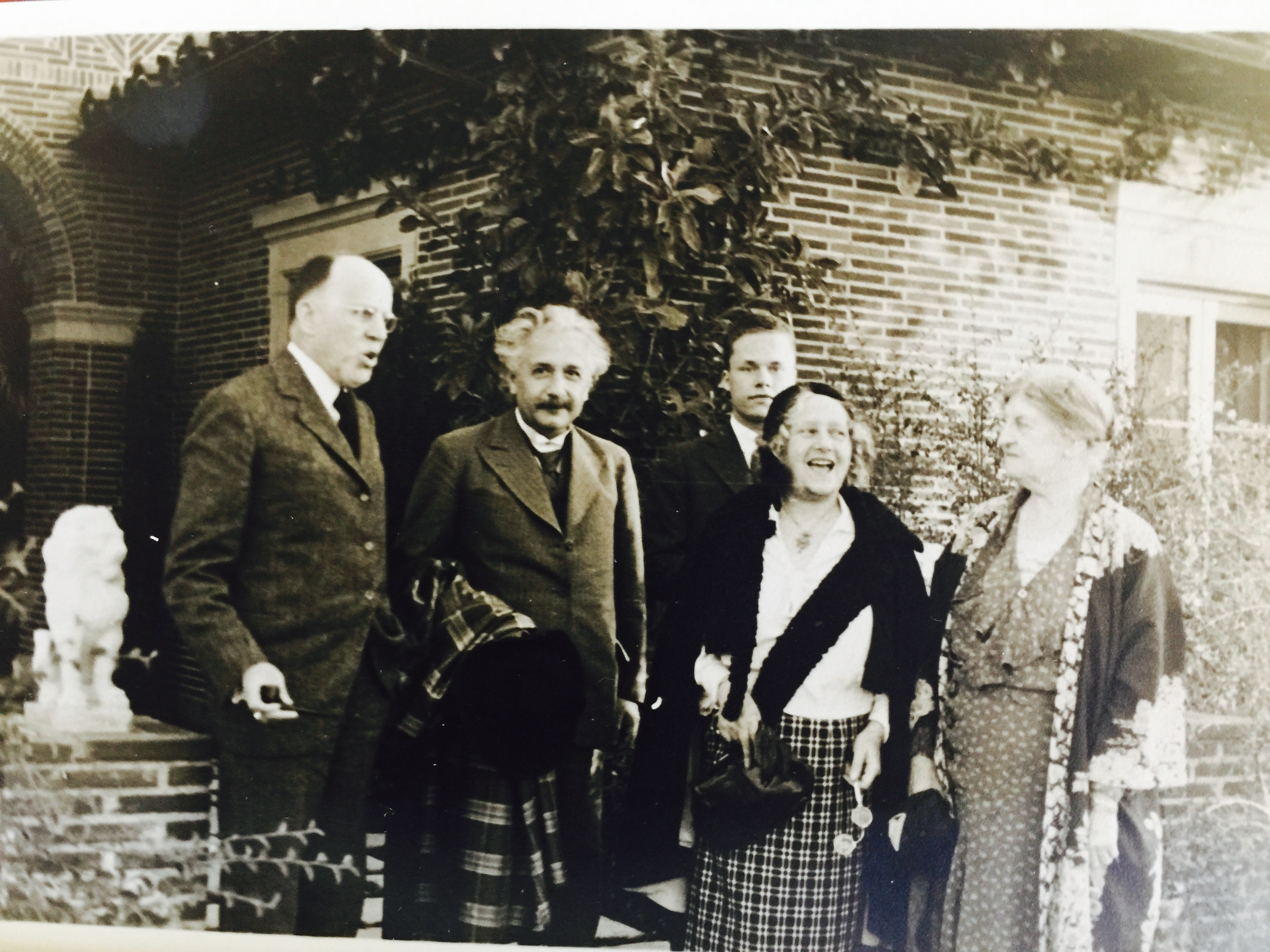
Dr. Ernest Carroll Moore, Dr. Albert Einstein, Elsa Einstein, Dr. Dorothea R. Moore, unidentified person in rear row, circa February 1932, UCLA Chancellor Residence. This photo is reversed.

He received Honorary LL.D.'s from the University of Southern California in 1916; the University of Arizona in 1923; Pomona College in 1931; and UCLA in 1942. He served on the board of directors of the Los Angeles Chamber of Commerce and on the board of trustees of the Los Angeles Philharmonic Orchestra in 1936.

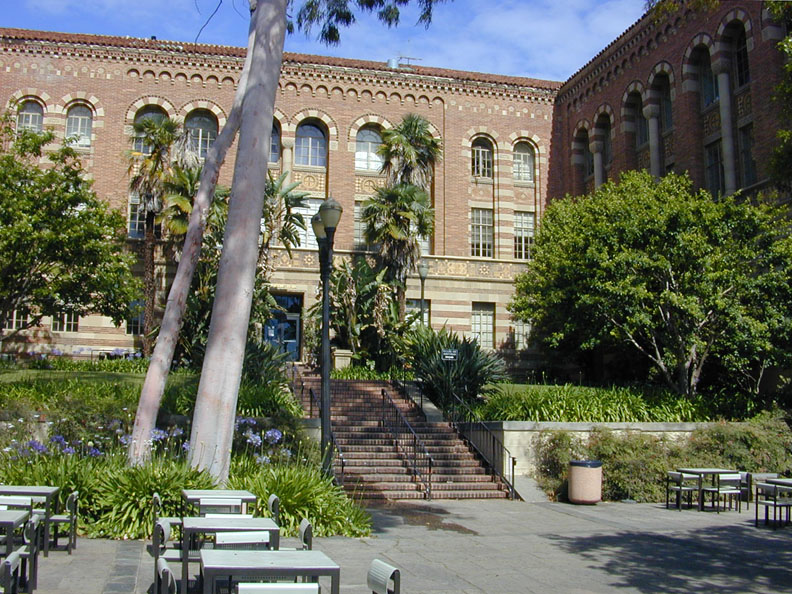
Moore Hall on the UCLA campus

=== Personal life ===
In 1896, he married Dr. Dorothea Rhodes Moore (1857–1942), a physician, poet, suffragette, advocate for the poor, activist for prevention of cruelty to children and animals, and divorcêe whose first husband was Charles Fletcher Lummis (1859–1928), a journalist, archaeologist and early activist for Indian rights. Ernest and Dorothea had a son, Kermit S. Moore. They resided on Woodruff Avenue in Holmby Hills, Los Angeles, close to the UCLA campus. Dorothea Moore died in 1942. In 1943, Ernest married Dr. Kate Gordon (1878–1963), a UCLA professor of psychology.

In 1936, Moore reportedly expressed his views to a crowd on the necessity for a "Republican New Deal" that would include the "forcible expulsion of unemployed from relief roles, sterilization of the unfit, and war on radicals."

=== Death and legacy ===
He died on January 23, 1955, at the age of eighty-three, in Los Angeles. Shortly after his death in 1955, the Education building on the UCLA campus was renamed Moore Hall in his honor.

== Quotes ==
“Education is learning to use the tools which the race has found indispensable.”—Quote found over the proscenium arch in Royce Hall at UCLA.

"But the greatest of these is philosophy and never more on trial than in this sorry world in which we live. Shall men tell the truth? Or resolve to live by lying? There are whole populations which have been indoctrinated in prevarication. Is kindness any longer a human virtue? Or is the true life of man an incessant struggle to see who draws first? There has been a transvaluation of values. The world is a battlefield and great nations direct their pilots to machine-gun refugees on crowded roads and call it war. We need a Socrates to teach us what words mean, but more to teach us what conceptions mean. That is what philosophy does, when it is not deadlocked over the barren problem of realism versus idealism. It is a kind of perspective of life, a sailing chart which helps us to find out how human undertakings are related to each other, where dangers lie, and how to sound the depths and keep to navigable waters."

== Bibliography ==
- Present Tendencies in Secondary Education (Lebanon, New Hampshire: University of Vermont Press, 1911)
- What Is Education? (Ginn, 1915)
- Educational Reconstruction (1919)
- What The War Teaches About Education (MacMillan, 1919)
- How New York City Administers Its School: A Constructive Study (World Book, 1919)
- Education as World-Building (with Thomas Davidson, Cambridge, Massachusetts: Harvard University Press, 1925)
- Social Activity, What is Meant By (New York, New York: Henry Holt and Company, 1929)
- John Dewey and His Educational Philosophy (1930)
- The Story of Instruction (MacMillan, 1936)
- California's Educators (1949)
- I Helped Make a University (Dawson's Book Shop, 1952)
- Some Speeches (Ward Ritchie Press, 1959, posthumous)
