= Clara Ross =

British composer and mandolinist

Clara Louisa Ross Ricci (1 July 1858 - 1954) was a British composer, mandolinist, and singer. She is best known for her compositions for mandolin and her songs, which she published as Clara Ross or Clara Ross-Ricci.

Ross was born in Brighton, England, to a well to do family. In 1877 she auditioned before Sir Arthur Sullivan and received a scholarship to study voice at the National Training School for Music in London, where she remained until 1882. She later studied at the Royal College of Music in London.

Ross learned to play mandolin as it became popular in the late 1880s. She formed an all-female mandolin band called the “Kensington Mandolinists” in the early 1890s and wrote much of their music herself. The group performed for the royal family and was favorably reviewed by The Musical Standard in 1892 and 1893, which noted that the “Kensington Mandolinists. . .performed some clever compositions of Miss Clara Ross. . . “ The group included guitars and was later renamed “Miss Clara Ross’ Ladies’ Mandolin and Guitar Band.”

In 1895, Ross moved to the United States to marry Richard Atkins Griffin, who had attended the Royal College of Music with her. He was a singer and voice teacher who used the stage name Riccardo Ricci. The couple settled in Wheeling, West Virginia, where Ross gave voice lessons and composed songs. Ricci died in 1905, and Ross remained in Wheeling for several decades, returning to Brighton sometime before World War II.

Ross’ music was published by Davis Burkham & Tyler Company, F. A. Mills, F. W. Baumer Company, George White, Huntzinger & Dillworth, John Alvey Turner, Oliver Ditson, Phillips & Page, Reid Brothers, Theodore Presser Company, William Maxwell Music Company, and Williams & Sons. Her compositions, many arranged several times for different instrumentation, include:

== Compositions ==
=== Mandolin and guitar ===
- Air de Ballet
- Cabaletta
- L’Allegro
- L’Ideal
- La Gracieuse
- Memoires d’Amour
- Sancta Maria
- Serenade
- Sicilienne

=== Mandolin and piano ===
- Air de Ballet
- Aubade
- Cabaletta
- Hush
- L’Ideal
- La Gracieuse
- Memoires d’Amour
- Narcisse - Romance
- Serenade
- Sicilienne

=== Vocal and piano ===
- “A Summer Dream”
- “An Old Sorrow” (text by Dorothea Moore)
- “Comfort the Soul of Thy Servant” (Psalm 86)
- “Each in His Own Name” (text by William Herbert Carruth)
- Evening Shadows (three women’s voices)
- Four Songs
- “Fret Not Thyself” (Psalm 37)
- “God of Our LIfe”
- “It was a Lover and His Lass”
- “July” (text by Lucy Hayward)
- “June” (text by Amos Phlox)
- “Leaf by Leaf the Roses Fall” (text by Caroline Dana Howe)
- “May” (text by Lucy Hayward)
- “Maytime” (three voices)
- “Medieval Romance”
- Orpheus with His Lute (three women’s voices; text by William Shakespeare)
- “Rainy Day” (text by Henry Wadsworth Longfellow)
- “Sancta Maria” (soprano and mandolin or violin)
- “Thou’rt Like a Flower” (text by Heinrich Heine)
- Two Flower Songs
