= Bernard Moses =

American historian

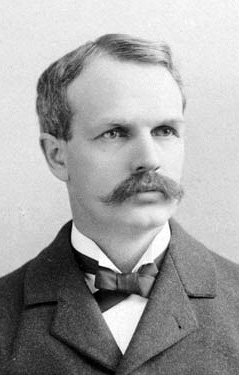

4th Philippine Secretary of Public Instruction
- In office September 1, 1901 – December 31, 1902
- Appointed by: William Howard Taft
- Preceded by: Aguedo Velarde
- Succeeded by: James Francis Smith

Personal details
- Born: August 27, 1846 Burlington, Connecticut
- Died: 1930 (aged 83–84) Walnut Creek, California
- Education: University of Michigan; Heidelberg University
- Occupation: Academic

Bernard Norton Moses (August 27, 1846 − 1930) was professor of history and political science at the University of California, Berkeley. He is most recognized for his contributions to the study of Latin America and the Spanish colonization of the Americas.

== Early life and education ==
Bernard Moses was born on August 27, 1846 in Burlington, Connecticut. He attended the University of Michigan and later the Heidelberg University in Germany, where he earned a law degree.

== Career ==
Moses began his career as a professor at Albion College. In 1875 he began teaching at the University of California, Berkeley in economics, history and jurisprudence. He founded the Department of History and Political Science in 1883, and created the Department of Political Science in 1903.

Moses was known as an authority on the history of the Spanish colonization of the Americas. He was among the first American scholars to write extensively on the subject. In 1894, Moses began offering coursework in Latin American history, one of the first courses of its kind in the United States. He continued to teach courses on Latin America through the end of his academic career.

In November 1894, Moses was elected president of the San Francisco Settlement Association, and in the following year, served as the first Head Resident of South Park Settlement in San Francisco.

Moses was a member of the Second Philippine Commission from 1900 to 1902, serving under then Governor-General of the Philippines and future U.S. President William Howard Taft. He subsequently took part in the Panamerican Scientific Congress in Chile and in the International Conference of American States in Argentina. He was also assigned minister plenipotentiary to Chile in 1910.

== Legacy ==
Eshleman Hall at University of California, Berkeley, originally built in 1931, was renamed Moses Hall in 1965. In 2023, Bernard Moses' name was removed from the building due to his racist and colonialist beliefs which were found in many of his writings.

== Selected publications ==
- "Social Science at its Method", 1880, Berkeley Quarterly, v.1, p. 1
- "The Communism of Early Christianity", 1880, Berkeley Quarterly, v.1, p. 211
- "The Crown and Parliament in Sweden", 1880, Berkeley Quarterly, v.1, p. 268
- "Early Swedish Literature", 1881, Berkeley Quarterly, v.2, p. 12
- "About Swedish Literature in the Eighteenth Century", 1881, Berkeley Quarterly, v.2, p. 225
- "The Extension of the Curriculum", 1881, Berkeley Quarterly, v.2, p. 336
- Politics: An introduction to the study of comparative constitutional law with W.W. Crane, 1883 [1898 ed, av]
- Imperial Germany: a lecture, 1886
- Social Infelicities of Half-knowledge: an address, 1886
- Data of Mexico and United States' History, 1887
- "The Establishment of Municipal Government in San Francisco", 1889, JHU Studies
- The Federal Government of Switzerland: An essay on constitution, 1889
- "The Social Sciences as Aids in Teaching History", 1891, Addresses before the California Teachers' Association, p. 16
- "The Economic Condition of Spain in the Sixteenth Century", 1893, JPE (Sep), p. 513
- "The Economic Condition of Spain in the Sixteenth Century", 1894, Annual Report of AHA,
- "The Nature of Sociology" Journal of Political Economy, Vol. 3, No. 1 (Dec., 1894), pp. 24–38.
- The Railway Revolution in Mexico, 1895
- "Certain Tendencies in Political Economy", 1897, QJE (Jul), p. 372
- The Establishment of Spanish Rule in America: An introduction to the history and politics of Spanish America, 1898 [bk, av]
- "The Economic Situation in Japan", 1898, JPE (Mar), p. 168
- Democracy and Social Growth in America, 1898
- "The Recent War with Spain from a Historical Point of View", 1899, Univ Chron, p. 400
- "New Problems in the Study of Society", 1900, Univ Chron, p. 13
- "The Ethical Importance of Our New Problems", 1900, Univ Chron, p. 205
- "The Western experiment with personal independence", 1904–05, Univ Chron, p. 25
- "The Control of dependencies inhabited by the less developed races", 1904–05, Univ Chron, p. 84
- "The Organisation of Public Instruction in the Philippines", 1905–06, Univ Chron, p. 93
- "Results of the War between Russia and Japan", 1905–06, Univ Chron, p. 118
- "Arbitration", 1906, Univ Chron, p. 259
- The Government of the United States, 1906
- South America on the Eve of Emancipation, 1908
- Spanish Dependencies in South America: an introduction to the history of their civilization, 1914, v.1, v.2 [av1, av2]
- Spain's Declining Power in South America, 1730-1806, 1919
- Spanish Colonial Literature in South America, 1922
- The Intellectual Background Of The Revolution In South America 1810-1824
- Spain Overseas, 1929
