= Lucile Eaves =

American sociologist

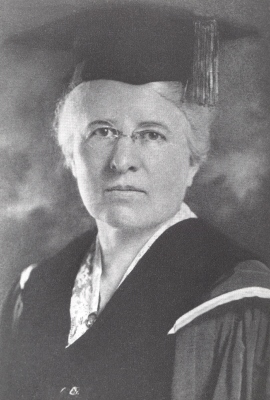
Lucile Eaves

Lucile Eaves (January 9, 1869 – January 20, 1953) was an American sociologist, university professor, and activist. She taught at Stanford University, the University of Nebraska, and Simmons College. She studied and advocated for the working class, women with disabilities, and labor law.

== Biography ==
Lucile Eaves was born in Leavenworth, Kansas, in 1869 and went to high school in Peoria, Illinois. She enrolled at Stanford University in 1892, shortly after it opened as one of the few universities in the United States to admit women. After graduation, she taught high school history in San Diego, but moved to continue her education at the University of Chicago and then Columbia University. While at the University of Chicago, Eaves taught a course on the Sociological Interpretation of History.

During the period of 1902–07, with an intermitte as*nt leave of absence, she served a Head Resident of South Park Settlement in San Francisco. She returned to California to aid in the relief effort following the 1906 San Francisco earthquake. She worked as a history instructor at Stanford and published the book A History of California Labor Legislation in 1907. After finishing the book, she accepted a job teaching applied sociology at the University of Nebraska in Lincoln, where she taught about European and American labor legislation, social betterment movements, poverty, and criminology. She was a member of the Nebraska Women's Suffrage Society, the American Association for Labor Legislation, and other organizations promoting labor reform and women's rights in Nebraska and nationally.

She resigned the job in Lincoln in 1915 because of low pay. She moved to Boston to teach at a Simmons College graduate program operated through Women's Educational and Industrial Union. In Boston, Eaves became one of the first sociologists to study medical sociology, especially women with physical disabilities. Her work prefigured modern sociology's concern with the structural ties between class and sex.

When Lucile Eaves died in 1953 in Brookline, Massachusetts, she was professor emeritus at Simmons and the school's oldest living faculty member.

== Personal life ==
Eaves enjoyed swimming, rowing, and aesthetic dancing.

== Bibliography ==
- A history of California labor legislation, 1907
- Gainful Employment for Handicapped Women, 1921
- Old Age Support of Women Teachers, 1921
- Children in Need of Special Care, 1923
- Aged Clients of Boston Social Agencies, 1925
