= GameTZ.com =

Online trading community

Game Trading Zone

- GameTZ.com logo and screenshot.
- Website type: Online trading community
- Available in: English
- Owner: Bill Marrs
- Creators: Stephen Osborne, Bill Marrs
- Website: gametz.com
- Commercial: Yes
- Registration: Required, Free
- Launched: 1996; 30 years ago (as Used Game Trading Zone)
- Current status: Active

GameTZ.com is an online trading community established in late 1996. It allows people to trade video games, books, music, movies, and other items by negotiating with other traders from countries worldwide. Once a trade is completed, a record is created on the site for future reference.

GameTZ.com has forums and a trading/matching system containing many tools necessary for tracking and recording online trading transactions. GameTZ.com's offer system allows users to send and receive offers, check out trade details, shipping methods, and so on.

Multi-platform gaming magazine GamePro and Forbes magazine have cited trading sites, specifically GameTZ.com, as excellent alternatives to selling games back to retail outlets at significantly reduced value. GameTZ.com has also been featured in other magazine articles and online reviews, and in a short TV news segment syndicated to stations across the United States.

== History ==
Stephen Osborne founded the Used Game Trading Zone (UGTZ) in the mid-1990s. Exactly when UGTZ came into existence is uncertain, but it has been traced back as far as December 23, 1996 (via a USENET posting by Osborne). Osborne manually maintained a growing list of items traders had available for trade. Traders would then scan through the very large lists to find items they wanted, then make offers via email to the owner(s).

As UGTZ grew, this list became more difficult for Osborne to maintain by hand. In October 1997, Bill Marrs created a system which automated much of the work Osborne had been doing by hand. For a short time thereafter, parts of UGTZ were maintained on Osborne's and Marrs' sites. Eventually, the decision was made to move the whole operation to Marrs' site.

The domain name ugtz.com was registered in the summer of 1998, and the independent database implementation was in the spring of 1999. This database allowed traders to view a list of potential trades, saving them a great deal of time in finding trades. In an effort to generate some income, 1999 also introduced advertisements, subscriptions, and an affiliate marketing program to the site.

In March 2000, the site was renamed Game Trading Zone, and the domain gametz.com was registered. Marrs cloned the GameTZ.com trading engine and established three other sites: MusicTZ.com, MovieTZ.com, and BookTZ.com. However, at the beginning of 2002, the music, movie, and book domains were dropped, and all four "Trading Zones" were folded back into the main GameTZ.com site.

In February 2003, the site changed to a subscriber-only format. While passive use by non-subscribers was still possible, a subscription was necessary to initiate trades and actively participate in the community. In August 2005, the site reverted to voluntary subscriptions, and non-subscribers were again allowed full access to GameTZ.com's trading and community features.

GameTZ.com has more than 346,000 trades completed as of February 2021.

== See also ==
- Bargaining
- Barter
- Electronic commerce
- Trade
