= Moses Hall =

Building at U.C. Berkeley

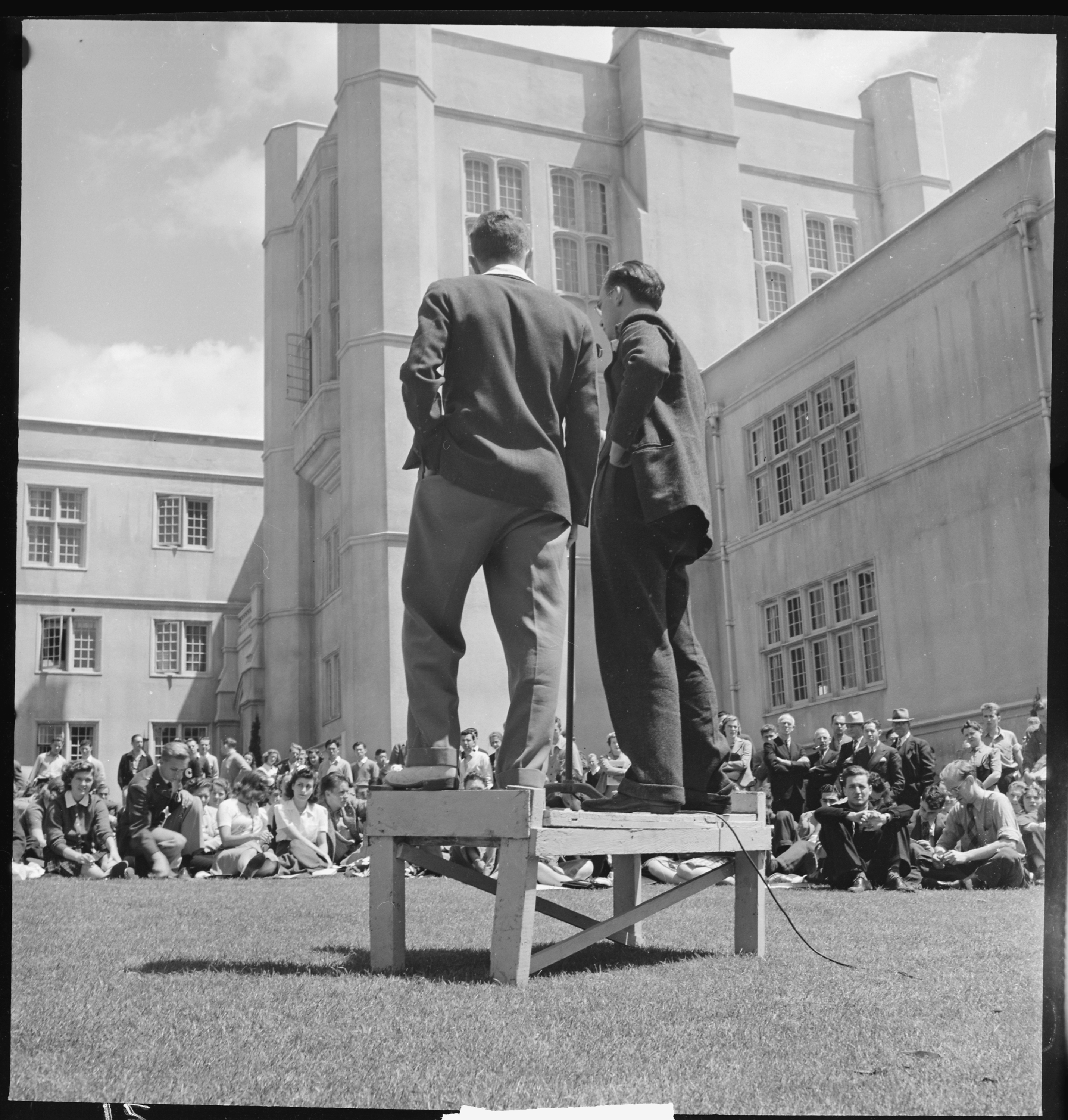
- Students outside Eshelman Hall (1940)
- Interactive map of the Moses Hall area

General information
- Location: Berkeley, California, United States
- Coordinates: 37.87100°N 122.25809°W
- Completed: 1931
- Owner: University of California, Berkeley

Design and construction
- Architect: George W. Kelham

Moses Hall, formerly known as Eshelman Hall, is a historic building on the campus of the University of California, Berkeley in Berkeley, California. It was built in 1931, and designed in the Tudor Revival and Gothic Revival styles by architect George W. Kelham. It was first named for John Morton Eshleman, and it was renamed for Bernard Moses in 1963. The building houses the Institute of Governmental Studies on the first floor, and the Howison Philosophy Library on the third floor. In 2023, Bernard Moses' name was removed from the building due to his racist and colonialist beliefs which were found in many of his writings. The building was renamed to Philosophy Hall in 2024.
