= William Herbert Carruth =

American educator and poet (1859–1924)

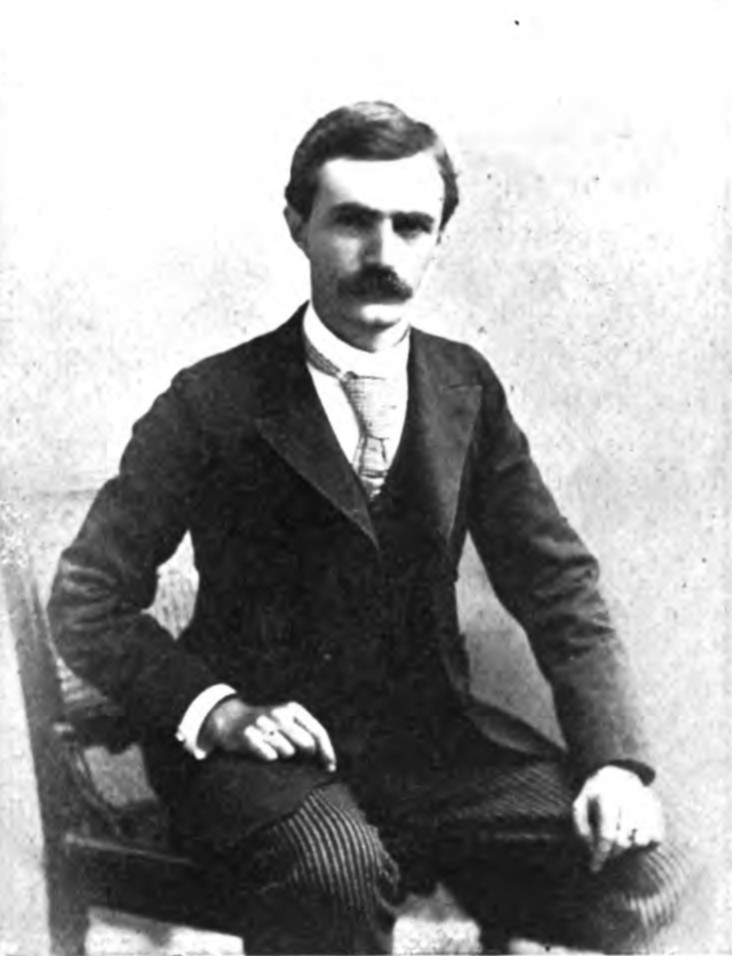
W.H. Carruth

William Herbert Carruth (April 5, 1859 – December 15, 1924) was an American educator and poet. He taught at the University of Kansas and Stanford University.

== Life ==
William Herbert Carruth was born in Osawatomie, Kansas on April 5, 1859. He earned AB and MA degrees in modern languages from the University of Kansas (KU) and later two more advanced languages degrees, another MA and a PhD, from Harvard. Carruth taught languages and literature at KU from 1880 until 1913, and was Professor of Comparative Literature at Stanford University from 1913 to 1924. Carruth was president of the Pacific Coast Conference of the Unitarian Church.

Carruth was an active women's suffrage supporter.

== Works ==
- Carruth translated Hermann Gunkel's "The Legends of Genesis" into an English version published in 1901.
- Carruth's poems include "Each in His Own Tongue," "Ghosts of Dreams," "Tescott" and "John Brown."

== Legacy ==
British composer Clara Ross used Carruth’s text for her song “Each in His Own Name.”
