= Goozex =

Online trading community

Goozex, Inc.

- Company type: Public
- Available in: English
- Traded as: OTCID Basic: SLGI
- Founded: March 2006
- Headquarters: Newburyport, Massachusetts, U.S.
- Area served: United States, Canada, Bermuda
- Owner: Bay Acquisition Corp.
- Founder: Jon Dugan
- CEO: J.P. McCormick
- Key people: Flavio Del Greco, Jon Dugan, Mark Nebesky, Valerio Zanini, Matt Dugan
- Industry: Internet, online retailing, video games
- Services: Online trading community
- Revenue: ▼US$ 232,464 (2011)
- Operating income: ▼US$ -52,210 (2011)
- Net income: ▲US$ -27,205 (2011)
- Total assets: ▼US$ 143,259 (2011)
- Total equity: ▼US$ 138,401 (2011)
- Employees: 2
- Advertising: Web banners
- Registration: Required
- Launched: July 10, 2006
- Current status: Closed December 31, 2013

Goozex was an online trading community established in July 2006 which allowed people to trade video games and movies in the United States, Canada and Bermuda. The name Goozex came from a shortened version of "Goods Exchanged." Goozex used an internal point system as currency and worked as a middleman matching buyers and traders instead of handling the actual movies and games. In November 2007, Goozex was ranked as the best website for trading games online by video game magazine Electronic Gaming Monthly and GamesRadar.com. It has since received a ranking of F from the Better Business Bureau. Goozex traded games for the Atari 2600, Xbox, Xbox 360, NES, Super NES, Nintendo 64, GameCube, Wii, Game Boy, Game Boy Color, Game Boy Advance, Nintendo DS, PlayStation, PlayStation 2, PlayStation 3, PSP, PS Vita, Sega Genesis, Sega CD, Dreamcast, Microsoft Windows, and Mac, along with movies in DVD, Blu-ray, HD DVD, and UMD formats.

== History ==
The idea for the site began late 2005 as founder Jon Dugan was annoyed by the low prices he received when trading games in to a local used-video-game store. Dugan teamed up with two other graduates from the Robert H. Smith School of Business at University of Maryland and incorporated the company in March 2006. The site opened to a public beta on July 10, 2006. Within three months, Goozex had 1,500 users signed up trading over 7,000 games. More than 48.6 million points were exchanged during their first two years, representing over US$2.1 million. Over 160,000 games were traded throughout 2008. On August 17, 2009, Goozex began to offer movie trading with 130,000 titles listed over four formats. On March 30, 2010, the site opened up trading of 6,000 titles from eight additional classic game systems. On November 16, 2012, Goozex was privately acquired by a holding company, Bay Acquisition Corp. for an undisclosed amount. On December 20, 2012, it was announced that J.P. McCormick would be the company's new president and CEO. Mr. McCormick resigned as president and CEO on December 31, 2013, and the website went down on the same day.

== Trading ==
Trading at Goozex was accomplished by a software algorithm matching buyers and sellers. Buyers requested games and movies with varying conditions and were then matched to sellers through a queue system. Each seller had 26 hours to accept the trade and another three days to ship the game to the buyer. After the trade was complete, buyers left feedback in order to show how well the trade went and if the game was received as expected. This feedback comprised a seller's feedback score.

Trades were made using both points and trade credits. Points were the currency of Goozex and were valued at 100 points for five dollars. Points were traded between users in exchange for movies and games or bought directly from Goozex. Games and movies were valued between 100 and 2400 points at intervals of 50 points. The game prices were set by Goozex and not individual sellers. The price of games and movies could have risen and fallen due to a variety of factors. Prices could only change once a week and by a difference of 50 or 100 points. Trade tokens were paid by buyers directly to Goozex as a commission fee. Each trade token cost $0.99 and trades cost between 1 and 3 tokens depending on the value of the game, although users with feedback scores of 500 or greater received a 50% discount.

== Closure ==
The site shut down on December 31, 2013, since the funds necessary in running the site are being held in escrow by Meyers Associates, L.P. Mr. McCormick resigned as president of Bay Acquisition Corp. on December 31, 2013.

== See also ==
- Barter
- Electronic commerce
- Trade
