= Dane Coolidge =

American author, naturalist, and photographer

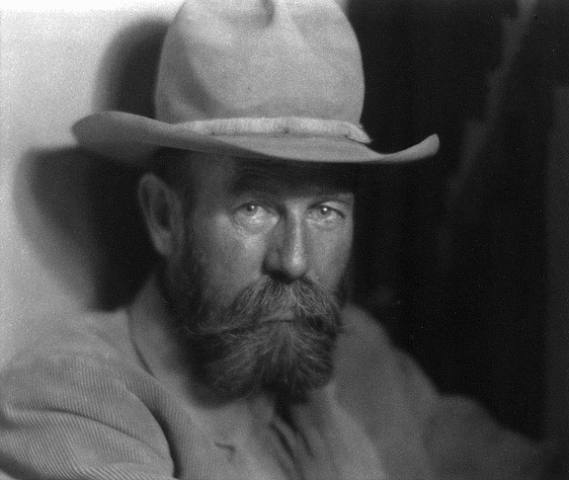
- Born: March 23, 1873; Natick, Massachusetts, USA
- Died: August 8, 1940 (aged 67); Berkeley, California, USA
- Education: Stanford University
- Occupations: Novelist; Short story writer; Naturalist; Photographer
- Spouse: Mary Roberts Coolidge
- Relatives: Calvin Coolidge (cousin)
- Writing career
- Years active: 1910–1940
- Genres: Westerns; Non-Fiction

Dane Coolidge (March 24, 1873 – August 8, 1940) was an American author, naturalist, and photographer. He wrote fiction, non-fiction, and articles featuring the American West. He wrote short stories for magazines and made illustrations. His book Rimrock Jones was adapted into the 1918 film Rimrock Jones. The Smithsonian Museum has three of his photographs in its collection. He wrote several dozen novels and many tens of short stories.

Coolidge was born in Natick, Massachusetts, the son of Francis Coolidge and Sophia (née Whittemore) Coolidge. His father had a farm in Riverside, California. He grew up in Riverside and went to Stanford University and did postgraduate work at Harvard University.

Coolidge collected animal specimens for the British Museum, Stanford University, the U.S. National Zoological Park, New York Zoological Park, and the United States Natural History Museum. He was a charting member of the American Society of Mammalogists.

He married one of his former teachers, sociologist Mary Roberts, on July 30, 1906, in Berkeley. They wrote The Navajo Indians in 1930. They also studied and photographed the Seri people of Sonora in the 1930s and wrote the book The Last of the Seris. Coolidge died in his Berkeley home on August 8, 1940.

== Bibliography ==
- Hidden Water (1910)
- The Texican (1911)
- The Fighting Fool (serial 1913; book 1918)
- Bat-Wing Bowles (serial, Alias Bowles, 1913; book 1914)
- The Desert Trail (1915)
- Rimrock Jones (1917)
- Shadow Mountain (1919)
- Silver and Gold (1919)
- Wunpost (1920)
- The Man-Killers (1921)
- Bitter Creek (serial From Bitter Creek, 1921–1922)
- Lost Wagons (1923)
- The Law West of the Pecos (1924)
- The Scalp-Lock (1924)
- Lorenzo the Magnificent (serialized as The Riders from Texas, 1924; book 1925)
- Under the Sun (1926)
- Not-Afraid (1926)
- Gun Smoke (1928)
- Horse-Ketchum (1930)
- Jess Roundtree, Texas Ranger (1933)
- Ranger Two-Rifles (1937)
- The Navajo Indians (1930)
- The Last of the Seris with Mary Roberts Coolidge (1939)
- Old California Cowboys (1939)
- Bear Paw (1941)
