= Kate Gordon Moore =

American psychologist (1878–1963)

- Born: February 18, 1878; Oshkosh, Wisconsin
- Died: October 4, 1963 (aged 85)
- Resting place: Forest Lawn Memorial Park (Glendale) Los Angeles County California, USA
- Citizenship: American
- Education: The University of Chicago (PhD, 1903)
- Known for: Psychology, Education
- Spouse: Ernest Carroll Moore
- Parent(s): William A. & Helen J. Gordon

Kate Gordon Moore (February 18, 1878 – October 4, 1963) was an American psychologist whose work focused on various aspects within cognitive psychology, and is noted for her work with color vision and perception, as well as aesthetics, memory, imagination, emotion, developmental tests for children, and attention span. Gordon's early work focused on color vision and how this interacted with memory. Her work shifted mid-career and then she started to research within the realm of education. Specifically, she published work that addressed women's education with regard to the notion that women must be educated differently from men. Her focus of research shifted once more later on in life and started to keen in on imagination and how it related to her earlier works of memory and emotion.

== Early life ==
Kate Gordon was born on February 18, 1878, to William A. Gordon and Helen J. Gordon. Kate had an older brother, also named William, as well as a younger brother named George J. and a younger sister named Sarah. Kate’s maternal grandfather, a clergyman, was born in Ireland, while her maternal grandmother was born in New York. Her paternal grandparents were both born in the U.S. Kate’s family had strong scientific and social values. Kate Gordon’s father was a physician and a surgeon, a profession that her brother would also eventually take on. Kate Gordon married Ernest Carroll Moore, an educator and philosopher in March 1943. Gordon met Moore at the University of California, Los Angeles (UCLA), where they both worked. They were married until Earnest’s death in 1955. Kate died in 1963, at the age of 85 from a brief illness.

== Education ==
Kate Gordon enrolled at the University of Chicago in 1896 and received her PhB in 1900 and her PhD in 1903. In the winter of 1903-1904, Gordon studied psychology in Germany at the University of Wurzburg as a fellow. During her tenure in Europe, she had also attributed to the German Psychological Periodical with her research she had conducted while in Germany. Gordon was also the first woman to receive membership to the German Society for Experimental Psychology.

== Career ==
From 1904 - 1906 she was the instructor of psychology at Mount Holyoke College and from 1906–07 she continued teaching at the Teachers College of Columbia University. During this time she focused her research towards assessing color vision in regards to the peripheral retina and the aesthetics of color. In 1908 she became a surveyor of educational institutions in Europe which was granted to her by Bryn Mawr College. This opportunity gave Gordon an opportunity to research aesthetics by allowing her to visit a number of international art congresses that took part in Europe. 1912–16 she held the position of associate professor of education at Bryn Mawr College upon her arrival back into the United States. During this time she also was the head of the department of education. This was also noted as the time when Gordon began researching education, specifically mental tests for schools. 1916–19 she was an assistant professor of psychology and education at the Carnegie Institute of Technology which quickly resulted into her becoming the associate professor at the Institute from 1919–21. During this time period, she was also a called for to be a consultant for the Children's Department of the State Board of Control of California where she would help develop mental tests and differing testing programs for children. Gordon, in 1922, then moved on to the Southern Branch of the University of California, or known today as the University of California, Los Angeles (UCLA) where she was continually employed until her death. In 1922 she was a lecturer of psychology and in 1923 she became an associate professor of the psychology department. In 1934, she became a full professor and also held summer school classes at Stanford University, University of Washington, University of Wyoming, and the University of Wisconsin. In 1930 she was given the opportunity following the death of her college, Shepherd Ivory Franz, to serve as the chair of the UCLA psychology department. Her work shifted once more at this time and focused primarily on the imagination and how it affected the previous psychology she had studied. In addition to this, she also served as the President of the Faculty Women's Group and the President of the Western Psychological Association. During her time at UCLA she developed a scholarship in education under her husband's name at the university, which is known as the Ernest Carroll Moore Scholarship. Dr. Kate Gordon retired in 1948 and was quickly given the position of professor emerita and even came back to UCLA to hold lectures when she was needed.

During her career, Kate Gordon published a number of research papers, all on the various topics under the branch of cognitive psychology. The main areas of cognitive psychology that she focused on are color vision and perception, as well as aesthetics, memory, imagination, and attention span. In one of her papers, which was published while she was completing her Ph.D. at the University of Chicago in 1902, Gordon reviews the work of a Mr. W. McDougall. In this paper she states that there are issues with McDougall’s rejection of the Hering-Muller theory of light and color vision, and his support for the Young-McDougall theory, for which she stated, “there are certain facts which offer difficulties.” Gordon also wrote and published numerous textbooks for college students studying psychology; two such textbooks are Esthetics and Educational Psychology.

== Achievements and awards ==
Gordon received the following awards:

- 1903 The Collegiate Alumnae Association awarded Dr. Kate Gordon a fellowship in Europe
- 1904 First woman to become a member of the German Society for Experimental Psychology
- 1941 The Alumni Association at the University of Chicago awarded Dr. Kate Gordon a citation for public service as their "most useful citizen" of the year.

== National professional societies ==
Gordon was a member of the following professional societies

- Member of the American Association for the Advancement of Science
- Member of the American Psychological Association
- Member of the American Philosophical Association
- President of the Western Psychological Association

== Publications ==
- 1903 The Psychology of Meaning. Chicago. University of Chicago Press.
- 1903 Meaning in Memory and in Attention. Psychological Review. 10(3): 267-283
- 1905 Wherein should the Education of a Woman Differ from that of a Man. The School Review.13(10): 778-794
- 1907 Study of After-Images on the Peripheral Retina Psychological Review. 14(2):122-167
- 1909 Esthetics. New York. Holt.
- 1917 Some Tests on the Memorizing of Musical Themes. Journal of Experimental Psychology. 2(2): 93-99
- 1919 Report of Psychological Tests of Orphan Children. Journal of Delinquency. 4: 46-55
- 1924 Group Judgements in the Field of Lifted Weights. Journal of Experimental Psychology. 7(5): 398-400
- 1925 The Recollection of Pleasant and of Unpleasant Odors. Journal of Experimental Psychology. 8(3):225
- 1925 Class Results with Spaced and Unspaced Memorizing. Journal of Experimental Psychology. 8(5): 337-343
- 1928 A Study of Early Memories. Journal of Delinquency. 12:129-132

== Sources ==
- Fisher, Carolyn S; Gengerelli, J. A.; Jones, F. Nowell; Seagoe, M. V. (April 1965). "University of California: In Memoriam, April 1965 - Kate Gordon Moore, Psychology: Los Angeles". University of California Calisphere.
- Ogilvie, Marilyn; Harvey, Joy, eds. (2000). The biographical dictionary of women in science: pioneering lives from ancient times to the mid-20th century. New York, NY: Routledge. ISBN 0415920396.
- Bailey, Martha J (1994). American Women in Science A Biographical Dictionary. Santa Barbara, CA: ABC-CLIO. ISBN 0874367409.
- Gordon, K. (1902). "Discussion and reports: On McDougall's observations regarding light-and-color vision". Psychological Review. 9 (5): 483–489. doi:10.1037/h0073315.
- Gordon, K. (1917). Educational Psychology. New York, NY: Henry Hold and Company.
- Gordon, K. (1909). Esthetics. New York, NY: Henry Hold and Company.
- Young, J. L. (2010). "Kate Gordon Moore". Psychology's Feminist Voices. Archived from the original on 30 November 2016.
- Siegel, Patricia Joan; Finley, Kay Thomas (1985). Women in the scientific search : an American bio-bibliography, 1724-1979. Metuchen, N.J.: Scarecrow Press. p. 323. ISBN 0810817551
