= Mary Roberts Coolidge =

American sociologist and author (1860–1945)

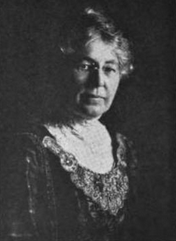
- Mary Roberts Coolidge, from a 1921 publication.
- Born: Mary Elizabeth Burroughs Roberts; October 28, 1860; Kingsbury, Indiana, U.S.
- Died: April 13, 1945 (aged 84)
- Education: Ph. D.
- Alma mater: Cornell University; Stanford University
- Occupation: Sociologist
- Spouse(s): Albert W. Smith (m. 1890–1903); Dane Coolidge (m. 1906–1940)

Mary Roberts Coolidge (October 28, 1860 – April 13, 1945), also known as Mary Roberts Smith, was an American sociologist and author. She was an instructor at Wellesley College before joining the faculty of Stanford University, where she became the first full-time American professor of sociology. She later founded the sociology department of Mills College.

== Early life ==
Coolidge was born Mary Elizabeth Burroughs Roberts in Kingsbury, Indiana, the daughter of Margaret Jane (née Marr) and Isaac Phillips Roberts. Both of her parents were Indiana farmers who emigrated to Mount Pleasant, Iowa in 1862. Her father would go on to become Professor of Agriculture at the Iowa Agricultural College after 1869, then was offered a similar position at Cornell University in 1873. He later became Dean of the Faculty of Agriculture and Director of the Experiment Station at Cornell.

Mary matriculated to Cornell, graduating with a Ph.B. in 1880 and a M.S. in 1882. She was a member of the Kappa Alpha Theta sorority and elected to the Phi Beta Kappa honor society.

== Career ==
Mary Roberts taught at public and private schools from 1880 until 1886, then was an instructor with the Department of History at Wellesley College until 1890. During her last two years at Wellesley, she served as secretary for the Board of Examiners. On August 28, 1890, she was married to Albert W. Smith, an assistant professor of mechanical engineering at Cornell. In 1891, he was professor of machine design at the University of Wisconsin, while she, along with former student Clelia Duel Mosher, continued research on the sexual practices of college women. The couple moved to Stanford University, where Mary earned her Ph.D. in 1896. The same year she was named assistant professor and later associate professor at Stanford, becoming the first full-time American professor of sociology.

The strain of a dual career family proved too much for the couple, and they were divorced in 1904. This painful event led to a mental breakdown and she had a brief stay at a sanitorium. The following year she tried to return to Stanford, but the university would not rehire her. Instead, Roberts became a research assistant at the Carnegie Institution in Washington D.C. until 1907. Starting in 1905, she was a worker for the San Francisco Settlement Association's South Park Settlement – a center of social welfare work for the city. However, this building was destroyed by the San Francisco Earthquake in 1906.

It was a few months later in 1906 that she married a former student of hers, Dane Coolidge, a naturalist who would author a series of Western novels. The two would spend time on horseback trips together through the southwest, and she contributed her sociology training to his works. In 1909 she joined the Russell Sage Foundation, and had her work Chinese Immigration published, which was considered by some a "remarkable book for its time", coming as it did when the Chinese Exclusion Act was in full force. In the book, she refutes anti-Chinese rhetoric and links anti-Chinese agitation in the state of California to the greed and prejudices of early settlers.

During 1910–1912, she served as president of the Settlement Council. Her work Why Women Are So, a sociological study of whether attitudes toward middle-class women had shaped their behavior, was published in 1912.

For many years following her breakdown that significantly reduced her eminence in the field, Roberts was unable to gain employment in an academic position. This changed in 1918 when she was hired as professor at Mills College, where she established the department of sociology and served as its first chair. Finally, she retired in 1926 as professor emeritus. Afterward, she co-authored The Rain-makers: Indians of Arizona and New Mexico (1929), The Navajo Indians (1930), and The Last of the Seris (1939) with her husband.

== Published works ==
- Smith, Mary Roberts (1895). Almshouse Women: A Study of Two Hundred and Twenty-eight Women in the City and County Almshouse of San Francisco. Vol. 3. WJ Schofield.
- Smith, Mary Roberts (1895). "Recent tendencies in the education of women". Popular Science Monthly. 48: 27–33.
- Smith, Mary Roberts (1898). Education for domestic life. D. Appleton and Company.
- Smith, Mary Roberts (1898). "Shall the College Curriculum Be Modified for Women?". Publications of the Association of Collegiate Alumnae: 1–15.
- Smith, Mary Roberts (1899). "The Social Aspect of New York Police Courts". American Journal of Sociology. 5 (2): 145–154. doi:10.1086/210878. S2CID 144007605.
- Smith, Mary Roberts (1900). "Statistics of College and Non-college Women". Publications of the American Statistical Association. 7 (49–50): 1–26. doi:10.2307/2276403. JSTOR 2276403.
- Smith, Mary Roberts (1901). "Functional Health of Women". Publications of the American Statistical Association. 7 (53): 255–259. doi:10.1080/01621459.1901.10503402.
- Warner, Amos Griswold; Coolidge, Mary Roberts (1908). American Charities. Vol. 4. Arno Press.
- Coolidge, Mary Roberts (1909). "Chinese Labor Competition on the Pacific Coast". The Annals of the American Academy of Political and Social Science. 34 (2): 120–130. doi:10.1177/000271620903400215. S2CID 143922994.
- Coolidge, Mary Roberts (1909). Chinese Immigration. Vol. 73. Arno Press.
- Coolidge, Mary Roberts (1912). Why women are so. Holt.
- O'Connor, Charles James; McLean, Francis H.; Artieda, Helen Swett; Motley, James Marvin; Peixotto, Jessica Blanche; Coolidge, Mary Roberts (1913). San Francisco Relief Survey: The Organization and Methods of Relief Used After the Earthquake and Fire of April 18, 1906. Russell Sage Foundation publications. Vol. 1. Survey Associates.
- Coolidge, Mary Roberts (1916). What the Women of California Have Done with the Ballot. California Civic League.
- Coolidge, Mary Roberts (December 1921). "The Role of the Foreignized Student in China". Pacific Review. 2 (3): 475–489.
- Coolidge, Mary Roberts (1929). The Rain-makers: Indians of Arizona and New Mexico. Houghton Mifflin Company.
- Coolidge, Dane; Coolidge, Mary Roberts (1930). The Navajo Indians. AMS Press.
- Coolidge, Dane; Coolidge, Mary Roberts (1939). The Last of the Seris. New York, E.P. Dutton & Co.
- Coolidge, Mary Roberts (1941). "Clelia Duel Mosher, the Scientific Feminist". Research Quarterly, American Association for Health, Physical Education and Recreation. 12sup3: 633–645. doi:10.1080/10671188.1941.10624707.
