= IOffer =

iOffer
- Screenshot dated August 5, 2008
- Website type: Online trading community
- Creator: Steven Nerayoff
- Website: ioffer.com
- Commercial: Yes
- Launched: May 1, 2002

iOffer was a San Francisco-based online trading community that was launched on May 1, 2002 by Steven Nerayoff. As of February 2008, it claimed to have nearly one million total users, including approximately 75,000 sellers, although this information cannot be independently verified, nor is it known how many of these users are active.

iOffer deviated from the online auction business model and instead adopted the "negotiated commerce model", characteristic of garage sales and flea markets, operating on the basis of negotiation between buyers and sellers rather than bidding. When a negotiation concluded successfully (i.e. a transaction occurs), iOffer charged a "final value fee" based on a sliding scale. The website advertised this distinction, claiming: "This is not an auction. It's better!"

iOffer permitted free listing of items for sale, charging fees only when items were sold or for premium listing services (such as bolding, highlighting, and listing on the home page). Sellers could post an asking price or request offers; buyers, in turn, could purchase an item at its asking price or make an offer. Users could also post "want ads" at no charge and barter. All transactions were recorded and could be viewed by other users.

iOffer competed with other similar negotiated e-commerce websites, as well as online auction sites such as eBay. According to Greg Holden, author of multiple books about eBay, from the perspective of sellers iOffer was both a "complement" and "good alternative" to eBay. Through iOffer's software program Mr. Grabber, sellers could relist items from eBay onto iOffer en masse, as well as import eBay feedback ratings.

Unlike sites such as eBay, however, iOffer provided little in the way of buyer or seller protection from fraudulent and other problem transactions. However, it did operate a C.O.P.S. scheme, similar to eBay's VERO program for items such as those involving counterfeit goods. Additionally, purchases with PayPal may be covered under PayPal's buyer protection program for items that were not received or not significantly as described.

While iOffer did not provide customer service via telephone, email customer service was available through the helpdesk, although form letter responses were the most likely response to most inquiries.

In a January 2011 survey of more than 2,800 online sellers by the website AuctionBytes.com, iOffer ranked 16th out of 16 marketplaces with an overall rating of 3.6 out of 10, just behind eBay's 14th place rank with 4.2 out of 10. iOffer's highest marks were for Ease of Use (4.42/10) and its lowest marks were for Would Recommend This Site (3.14/10).

In March 2019, it was reported that the IACC (International AntiCounterfeiting Coalition) had blocked iOffer's access to most if not all methods of payment, forcing the site to temporarily shut down. In December 2019, iOffer’s website stated that it had terminated all services permanently.
