= Online trading community =

An online trading community provides participants with a structured method for trading, bartering, or selling goods and services. These communities often have forums and chatrooms designed to facilitate communication between the members. An online trading community can be likened electronic equivalent of a bazaar, flea market, or garage sale.

== History ==
One of the earliest trading sites on the internet (with exception to eBay which accepts cash transactions for all goods) was Game Trading Zone. The domain name ugtz.com was implemented in an independent database in the spring 1999. This was a departure from simply listing items on a forum or text document. The database helped traders by showing them a list of potential trading matches, and showed historical transactions as well.

== Formal trading communities ==
A formal trading community consists of a website or network of websites that facilitate and track trade transactions. Some websites, such as the video game trading site Goozex, charge transactional fees per trade, while other similar sites such as GameTZ do not.

Key elements of formal trading communities

- Transactional tracking
- Ratings and feedback system
- Content listing, referencing, and matching

== Trading communities ==
There are several community based websites that have a broader scope and lend themselves to a trading environment.

- 1UP is a website dedicated to the publishing of news, videos, and other related media dealing with video games. There is a growing section of the site though dedicated the trading of games and DVDs on their message boards.
- Craigslist is a site for posting personal advertisements but many users have found this a less than conventional means of trading goods online with local residents.
- IGN is another website dedicated to videogame news and media that also has message boards dedicated to online trading. The distinguishing factors being that IGN has a much larger integrated database of games and DVDs in existence that users can add to their collection lists for trade purposes as well as mark the ones they are playing to lock from trade.

== Trading circle ==
A trading circle is a form of online trading designed to facilitate viewing of television series and episodic media. Physical media such as videocassettes, DVDs and CDs are exchanged via mail. Each member agrees to pass an episode on to the next member in a timely fashion, thereby allowing all members of the group to view the series. This communal trading method is also used by special interest clubs. Some of these groups (among many) include anime clubs.

== Trading Portal ==
In economics and in the financial field, electronic trading facilities gives to economic operators and investors who are part the online trading community a greater choice for business, financial transactions or other trading networks. A Trading Portal within the context of international trading on stock exchanges would be one that offers a selection of online trading platforms to choose from. This can be in the form of information provided on various regulated entities providing this service to stock market traders throughout the world or, alternatively, by way of a list of regulated investment dealers on the web who offer a selection of online trading platforms.

== Examples ==
- GameTZ.com - A game trading community, born out of the Usenet community in the mid 90s
- Goozex - Video game trading community

== See also ==
- BookMooch
- Lala (website)
