= History of the Philippines (1898–1946) =

The history of the Philippines from 1898 to 1946 is known as the American colonial period, which began with the outbreak of the Spanish–American War in April 1898, when the Philippines was still a colony of the Spanish East Indies, and concluded when the United States formally recognized the independence of the Republic of the Philippines on July 4, 1946.

With the signing of the Treaty of Paris on December 10, 1898, Spain ceded the Philippines to the United States. The interim U.S. military government of the Philippine Islands experienced a period of great political turbulence, characterized by the Philippine–American War.

A series of insurgent governments that lacked significant international and diplomatic recognition also existed between 1898 and 1904. (Note: Unrecognized insurgent governments (1898–1904): Dictatorial Government of the Philippines (May 24, 1898 – June 23, 1898); Revolutionary Government of the Philippines (June 23, 1898 – January 23, 1899); First Philippine Republic (January 23, 1899 – March 23, 1901); Tagalog Republic (1902–1904))

Following the passage of the Philippine Independence Act in 1934, a Philippine presidential election was held in 1935. Manuel L. Quezon was elected and inaugurated as the second president of the Philippines on November 15, 1935. The Insular Government was dissolved, and the Commonwealth of the Philippines, intended to be a transitional government in preparation for the country's full achievement of independence in 1946, was brought into existence.

After the Japanese invasion in 1941 during World War II and subsequent occupation of the Philippines, the United States and Philippine Commonwealth military completed the recapture of the Philippines after Japan's surrender and spent nearly a year dealing with Japanese troops who were not aware of the war's end, leading up to U.S. recognition of Philippine independence on July 4, 1946.

== Philippine Revolution and the Spanish–American War ==
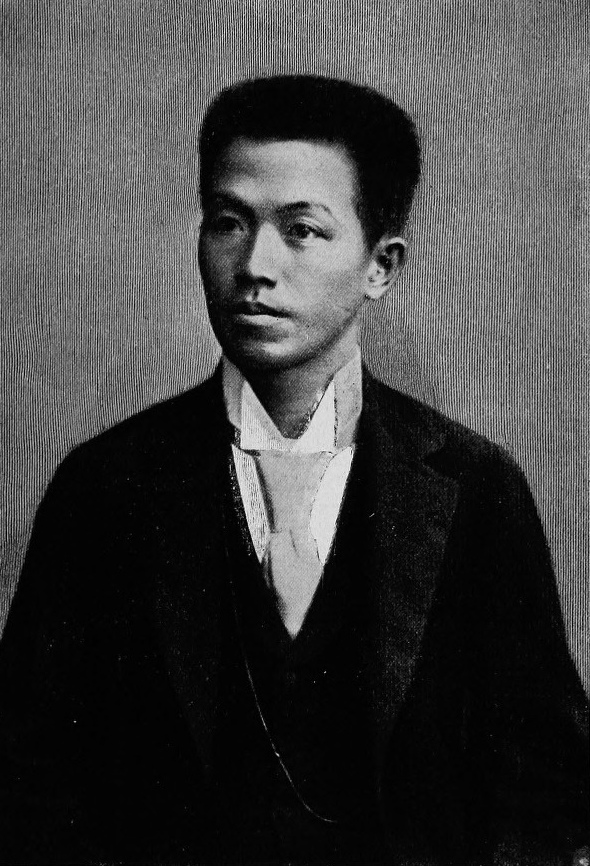
General Emilio Aguinaldo

The Philippine Revolution began in August 1896. The Pact of Biak-na-Bato, a ceasefire between the Spanish colonial governor-general Fernando Primo de Rivera and the revolutionary leader Emilio Aguinaldo that was signed on December 15, 1897. The terms of the pact called for Aguinaldo and his militia to surrender. Other revolutionary leaders were given amnesty and a monetary indemnity by the Spanish government in return for which the rebel government agreed to go into exile in Hong Kong.

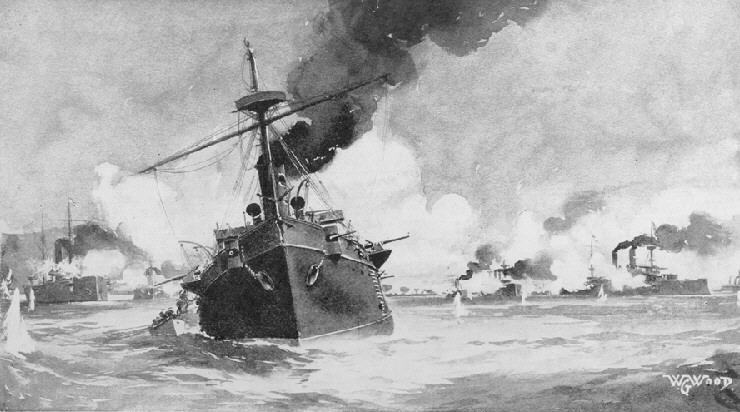
Battle of Manila Bay

Concurrently, the failure of Spain to engage in active social reforms in Cuba as demanded by the United States government was the basic cause for the Spanish–American War. President William McKinley issued an ultimatum to Spain on April 19, 1898. Spain found it had no diplomatic support in Europe, but nevertheless declared war; the U.S. followed on April 25 with its own declaration of war. Theodore Roosevelt, who was at that time Assistant Secretary of the Navy, had ordered Commodore George Dewey, commanding the Asiatic Squadron of the United States Navy, to Hong Kong before the declaration of war. From there, Dewey's squadron departed on April 27 for the Philippines, reaching Manila Bay on the evening of April 30. The Battle of Manila Bay took place on May 1, 1898, with American victory being achieved in a matter of hours.

The unexpected rapidity and completeness of Dewey's victory in the first engagement of the war prompted the McKinley administration to make the decision to capture Manila from the Spanish. While awaiting the arrival of troops from the Eighth Corps, Dewey dispatched the cutter USRC McCulloch to Hong Kong to transport Aguinaldo back to the Philippines. Aguinaldo arrived on May 19 and, after a brief meeting with Dewey, resumed revolutionary activities against the Spanish. On May 24, Aguinaldo issued a proclamation in which he assumed command of all Philippine forces and announced his intention to establish a dictatorial government with himself as dictator, saying that he would resign in favor of a duly elected president. Public jubilation marked Aguinaldo's return. Many Filipino enlisted men deserted local Spanish army units to join Aguinaldo's command and the Philippine Revolution against Spain resumed, capturing many cities and some entire provinces.

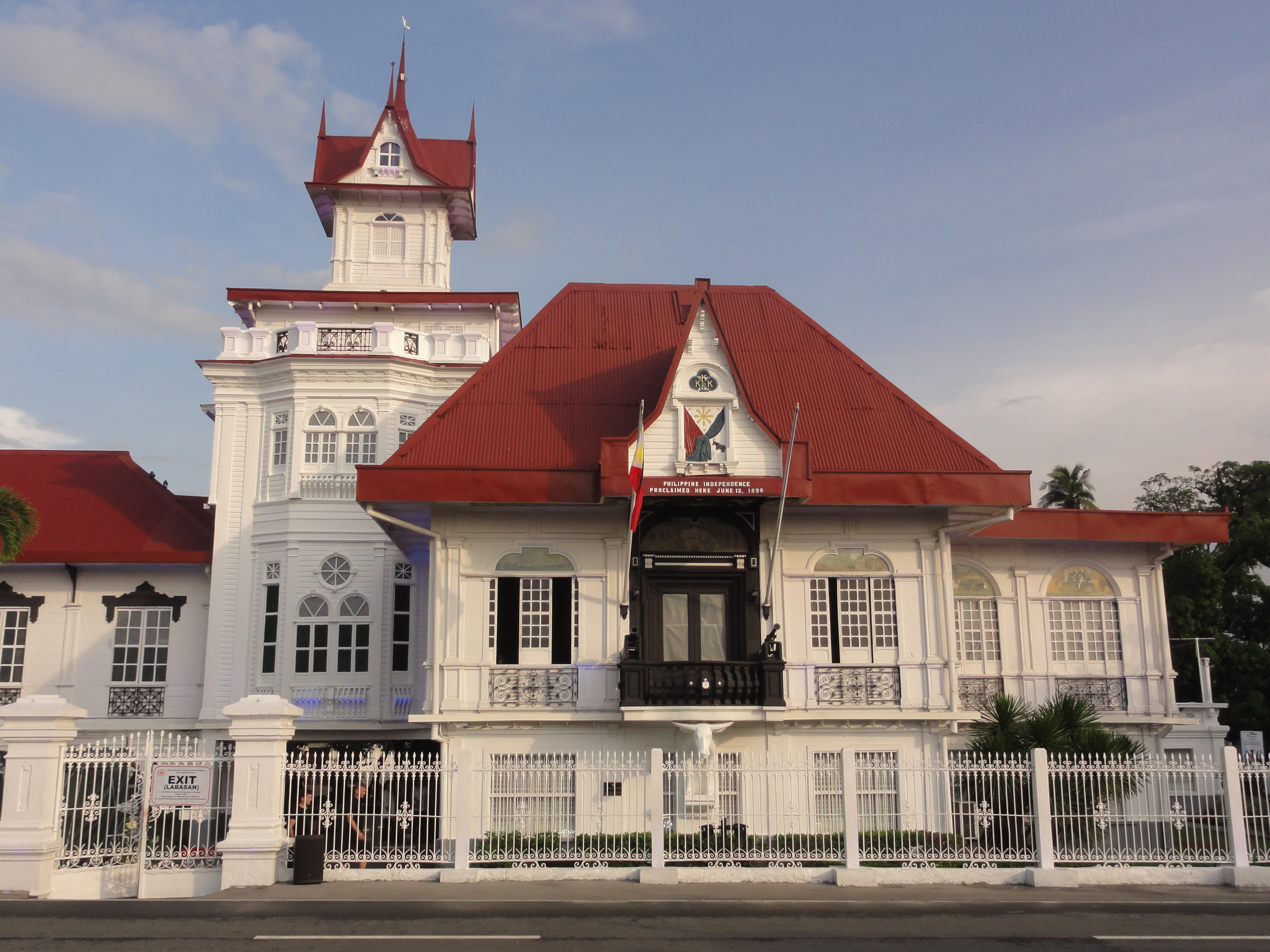
Aguinaldo Shrine, where the flag of the Philippines was raised during the declaration of independence from Spain

On June 12, 1898, Aguinaldo proclaimed the independence of the Philippines at his house in Cavite El Viejo. The "Acta de la Proclamacion de Independencia del Pueblo Filipino" in Ambrosio Rianzares Bautista's penmanship was signed by 98 natives on June 12, 1898, thereat. The only copy thereof, "The Birth Certificate of the Filipino Nation" is handwritten by Lt. Col. Jose Bañuelo. On June 18, Aguinaldo issued a decree formally establishing his dictatorial government. On June 23, Aguinaldo issued another decree, this time replacing the dictatorial government with a revolutionary government (and naming himself as president). On July 15, Aguinaldo issued three organic decrees assuming civil authority of the Philippines.

The first contingent of American troops arrived on June 30 under the command of Brigadier General Thomas McArthur Anderson. Anderson wrote to Aguinaldo, requesting his cooperation in military operations against the Spanish forces. Aguinaldo responded, thanking General Anderson, but saying nothing about military cooperation. General Anderson did not renew the request. American generals suspected Aguinaldo was attempting to take Manila without American assistance, had restricted supplies to American forces, and was secretly negotiating with Spanish authorities while informing them of American troop movements. Aguinaldo warned that American troops should not disembark in places conquered by the Filipinos without first communicating in writing, and did not offer his full service to arriving American forces. By June, U.S. and Filipino forces had taken control of most of the islands, except for the walled city of Intramuros. Admiral Dewey and General Merritt were able to work out a bloodless secret agreement with acting governor-general Fermín Jáudenes, staging a mock battle in which the Spanish forces would be defeated by the American forces, but the Filipino forces would not be allowed to enter the city.

On the evening of August 12, the Americans notified Aguinaldo to forbid the insurgents under his command from entering Manila without American permission. On August 13, unaware of the peace protocol signing, U.S. forces began the Battle of Manila by capturing Spanish positions in the city. While the plan was for a mock battle and simple surrender, the insurgents made an independent attack of their own, which led to confrontations with the Spanish in which some American soldiers were killed and wounded. The Spanish formally surrendered Manila to U.S. forces. Aguinaldo demanded joint occupation of the city, however U.S. commanders pressed Aguinaldo to withdraw his forces from Manila.

=== Peace protocol between the U.S. and Spain ===
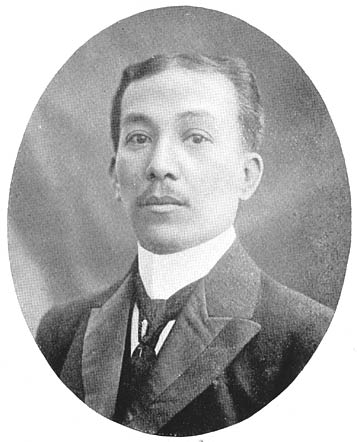
Felipe Agoncillo was the First Philippine Republic representative to the negotiations in Paris that led to the Treaty of Paris (1898), ending the Spanish–American War. He has been referred to as the "outstanding first Filipino diplomat."

On August 12, 1898, a peace protocol was signed in Washington between the U.S. and Spain. The full text of the protocol was not made public until November 5, but Article III read: "The United States will occupy and hold the City, Bay, and Harbor of Manila, pending the conclusion of a treaty of peace, which shall determine the control, disposition, and government of the Philippines." General Merritt received news of the peace protocol on August 16, three days after the surrender of Manila. Admiral Dewey and General Merritt were informed by a telegram dated August 17 that the president of the United States had directed that the United States should have full control over Manila, with no joint occupation permissible. After further negotiations, insurgent forces withdrew from the city on September 15. The Battle of Manila marked the end of Filipino-American collaboration.

On August 14, 1898, two days after the capture of Manila, the U.S. established a military government in the Philippines, with General Merritt acting as military governor. During military rule (1898–1902), the U.S. military commander governed the Philippines under the authority of the U.S. president as commander-in-chief of the United States Armed Forces. After the appointment of a civil governor-general, the procedure developed that as parts of the country were pacified and placed firmly under American control, responsibility for the area would be passed to the civilians. (Note: The military government held governmental authority until the appointment of the Taft Commission on September 1, 1900. In his instructions to the commission, President McKinley made it clear that the commission had the authority to exercise civil authority and to determine at what point civil administration could safely be undertaken.)

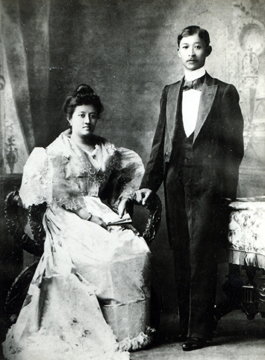
General José Alejandrino - Minister of Agriculture, Industry and Commerce of the First Philippine Republic

Under the military government, an American-style school system was introduced, initially with soldiers as teachers; civil and criminal courts were reestablished, including a supreme court; and local governments were established in towns and provinces. The first local election was conducted by General Harold W. Lawton on May 7, 1899, in Baliuag, Bulacan. The position of military governor was abolished in July 1902, after which the civil governor-general became the sole executive authority in the Philippines.

Elections were held by the revolutionary government between June and September 10, resulting in the seating of a legislature known as the Malolos Congress. In a session between September 15 and November 13, 1898, the Malolos Constitution was adopted. It was promulgated on January 21, 1899, creating the First Philippine Republic with Emilio Aguinaldo as president.

While the initial instructions of the American commission undertaking peace negotiators with Spain was to seek only Luzon and Guam, which could serve as harbours and communication links, President McKinley later wired instructions to demand the entire archipelago. The resultant Treaty of Paris, signed in December 1898, formally ended the Spanish–American War. Its provisions included the cession of the archipelago to the United States, for which $20 million would be paid as compensation. The treaty took effect on April 11, 1899 with the exchange of ratifications, establishing the U.S. Insular Government of the Philippine Islands, with William Howard Taft serving as its first governor-general. The Treaty of Washington of 1900, clarified that Spanish territories in the archipelago which lay outside the geographical boundaries noted in the Treaty of Paris were also ceded to the U.S.

On December 21, 1898, president McKinley proclaimed a policy of benevolent assimilation with regards to the Philippines. This was announced in the Philippines on January 4, 1899. Under this policy, the Philippines was to come under the sovereignty of the United States, with American forces instructed to declare themselves as friends rather than invaders.

== Philippine–American War (1899–1902) ==
=== Rising tensions and war ===
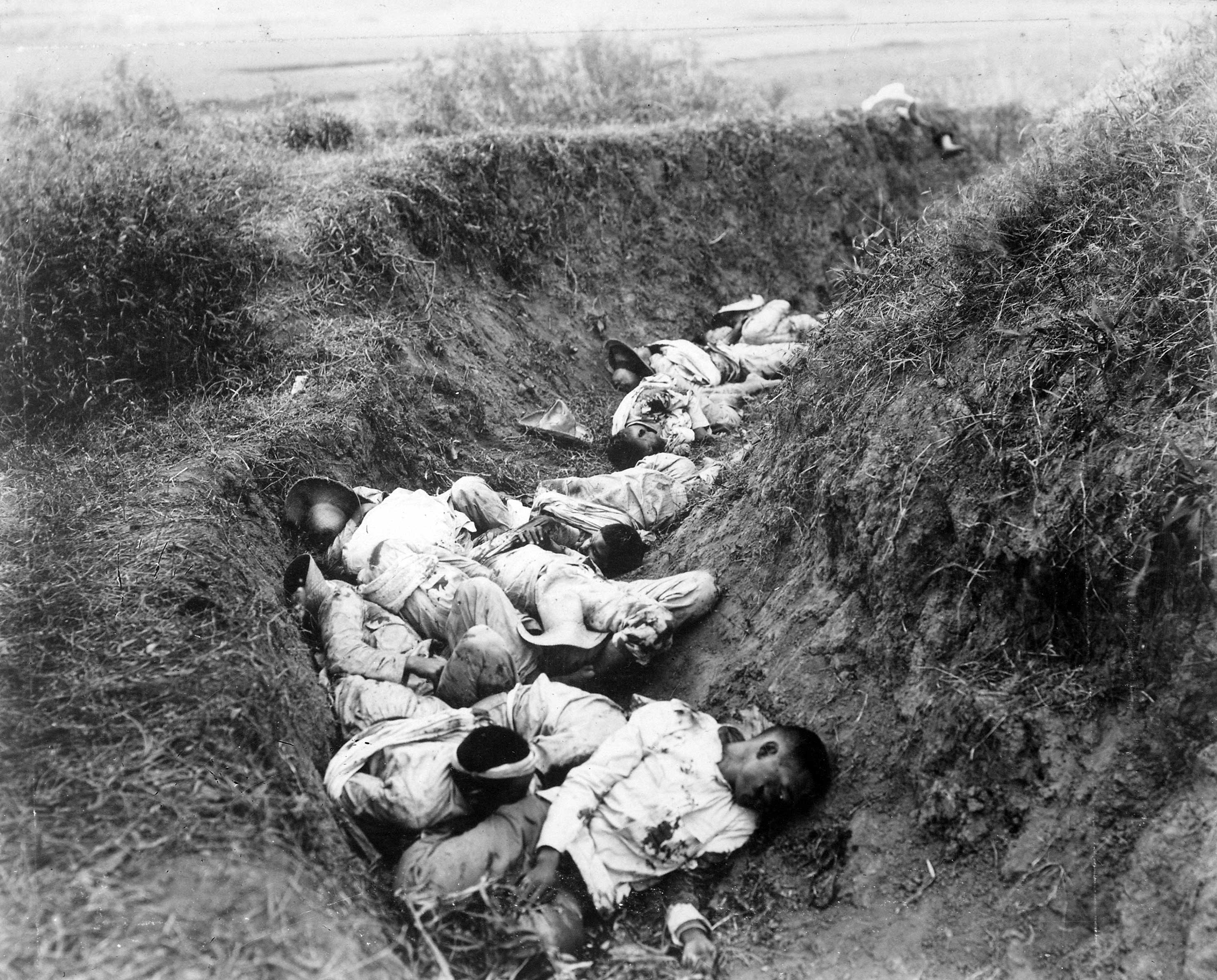
Filipino soldiers killed in Santa Ana during the Battle of Manila on the first day of the war

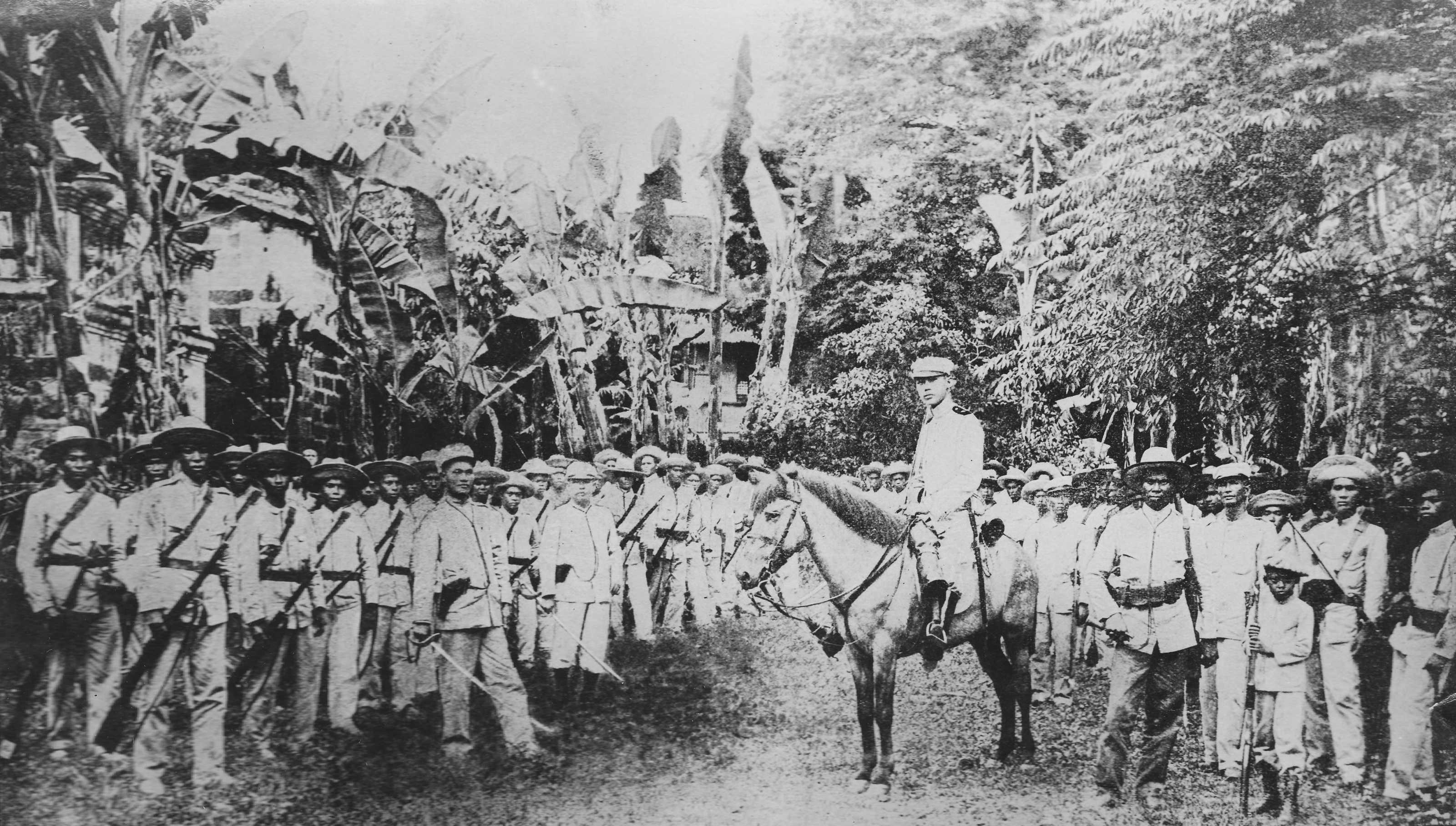
Gregorio del Pilar and his troops in 1898

On December 21, 1898, President McKinley issued a proclamation of benevolent assimilation. General Otis delayed its publication until January 4, 1899, then publishing an amended version edited so as not to convey the meanings of the terms "sovereignty", "protection", and "right of cessation" which were present in the unabridged version. Meanwhile, on December 26, 1898, the Spanish yielded Iloilo to the Filipinos. American forces under General Marcus P. Miller arriving in Iloilo were refused permission to land by the Filipinos, who stated that landing required "express orders from the central government of Luzon". Unknown to Otis, the War Department had also sent a copy of McKinley's proclamation to General Miller in Iloilo who, unaware that a politically bowdlerized version had been sent to Aguinaldo, published it in both Spanish and Tagalog. Even before Aguinaldo received the unaltered version and observed the changes in the copy he had received from Otis, he was upset that Otis had altered his own title to "Military Governor of the Philippines" from "... in the Philippines". Aguinaldo did not miss the significance of the alteration, which Otis had made without authorization from Washington.

On January 5, Aguinaldo issued a counter-proclamation summarizing American violations of the ethics of friendship, and stated that a takeover of the Visayas by the Americans would lead to hostilities. Within the same day Aguinaldo replaced this proclamation with another that directly protested American infringement on "the sovereignty of these islands". Otis took these two proclamations as a call to arms, and as tensions increased 40,000 Filipinos fled Manila within 15 days. Meanwhile, Felipe Agoncillo, who had been commissioned by the Philippine government as minister plenipotentiary to negotiate treaties with foreign governments, filed a request in Washington for an interview with the president to discuss affairs in the Philippines. At the same time Aguinaldo protested against General Otis styling himself "Military Governor of the Philippines", and Agoncillo, along with Filipino committees in London, Paris, and Madrid, issued statements to the United States noting a refusal for the Philippines to come under American sovereignty. Filipino forces were ready to assume the offensive, but instead sought to provoke the Americans into firing the first shot. On January 31, 1899, The Minister of Interior of the revolutionary First Philippine Republic, Teodoro Sandiko, signed a decree saying that President Aguinaldo had directed that all idle lands be planted to provide food for the people, in view of impending war with the Americans.

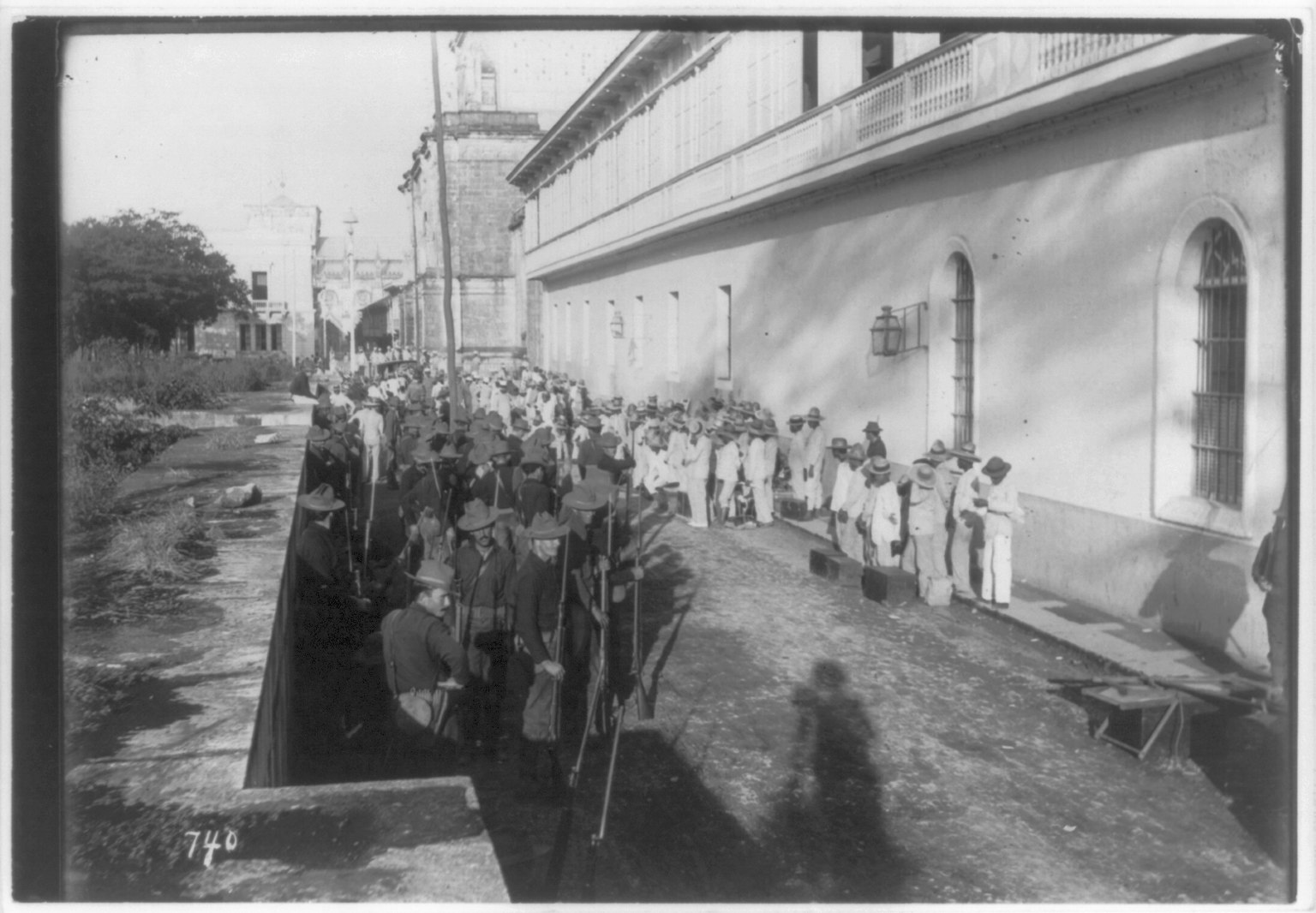
Philippines, Manila, 1899– U.S. soldiers and Filipino prisoners of war

An outbreak of gunfire between a Filipino patrol force and an American outpost on February 4 set off open hostilities between the two forces. On June 2, 1899, the First Philippine Republic issued a declaration of war on the United States. As before when fighting the Spanish, the Filipino army did not do well in the field. Aguinaldo and his government escaped after the capture of Malolos on March 31, 1899, and were gradually driven into northern Luzon. In the 5th of June, Filipino general and commander-in-chief of the Philippine Republican Army Antonio Luna was assassinated in Cabanatuan by members of the Kawit Battalion, severely damaging the morale and effectiveness of Filipino troops. Peace feelers from members of Aguinaldo's cabinet failed in May when the American commander, General Ewell Otis, demanded an unconditional surrender. In 1901, Aguinaldo was captured and swore allegiance to the United States, marking one end to the war. However, even after the fall of the Republic, resistance led by General Miguel Malvar continued until his surrender in April 1902.

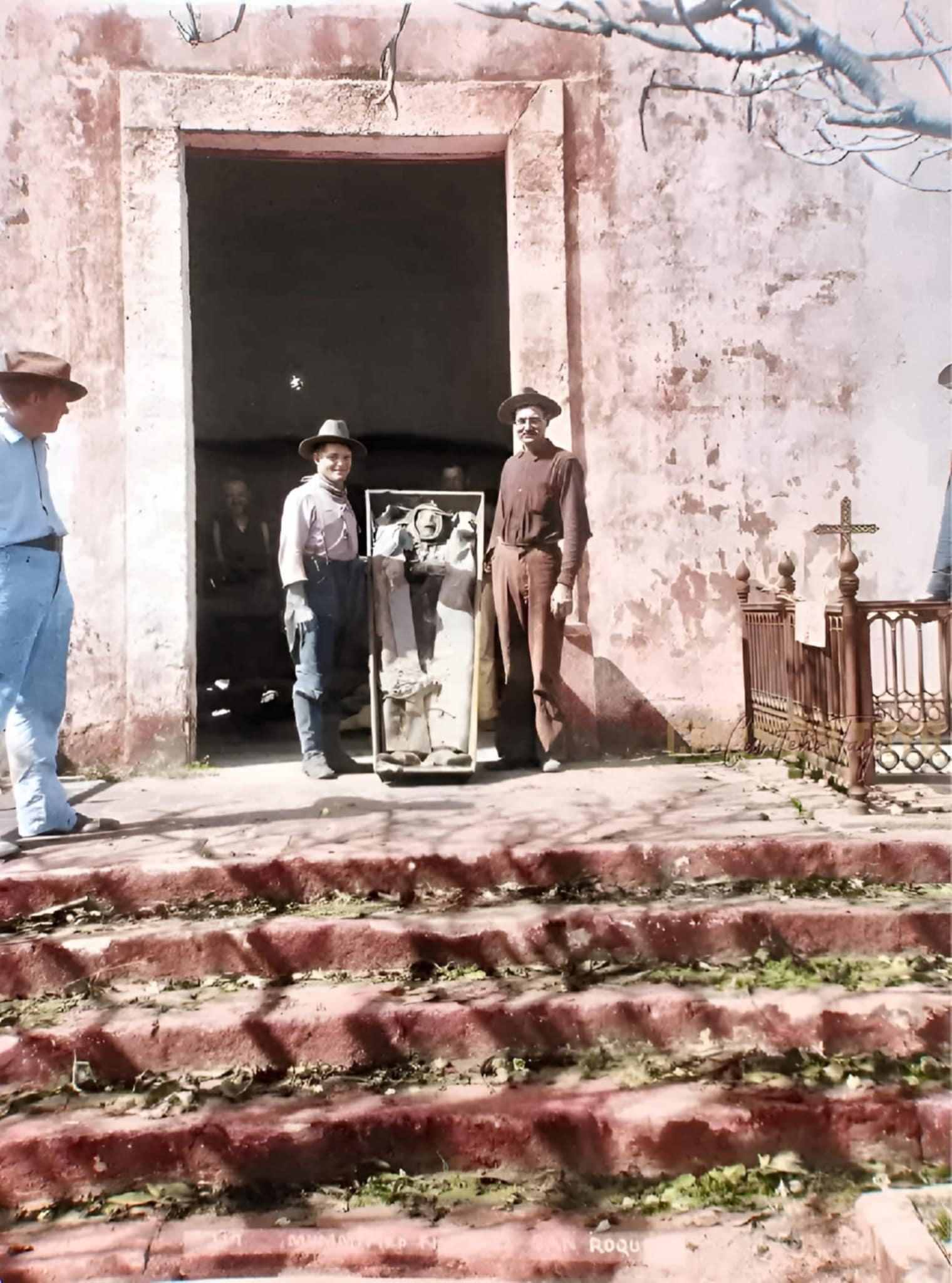
Americans displaying a mummified Filipino from a church tomb in San Roque, Philippines 1899

Casualties during the war were much greater among Filipinos than among Americans. Almost 4,000 American soldiers died, out of about 125,000 that fought on the island. About 20,000 Filipino soldiers combatants died, as well as 250,000 to a million non-combatants. Causes of non-combatant deaths included a cholera epidemic as well as killings by the United States military, including specific attacks on civilians and the creation of concentration camps.

=== First Philippine Commission ===
President McKinley had appointed a five-person group on January 20, 1899, to investigate conditions in the islands and make recommendations. The three civilian members of the Philippine Commission arrived in Manila on March 4, 1899, a month after the Battle of Manila which had begun armed conflict between U.S. and revolutionary Filipino forces.

After meetings in April with revolutionary representatives, the commission requested authorization from McKinley to offer a specific plan. McKinley authorized an offer of a government consisting of "a Governor-General appointed by the President; cabinet appointed by the Governor-General; [and] a general advisory council elected by the people." The Revolutionary Congress voted unanimously to cease fighting and accept peace and, on May 8, the revolutionary cabinet headed by Apolinario Mabini was replaced by a new "peace" cabinet headed by Pedro Paterno. At this point, General Antonio Luna arrested Paterno and most of his cabinet, returning Mabini and his cabinet to power. After this, the commission concluded that "... The Filipinos are wholly unprepared for independence ... there being no Philippine nation, but only a collection of different peoples." Specific recommendations included the establishment of civilian government as rapidly as possible (the American chief executive in the islands at that time was the military governor), including establishment of a bicameral legislature, autonomous governments on the provincial and municipal levels, and a system of free public elementary schools.

=== Second Philippine Commission ===
The Second Philippine Commission (the Taft Commission), appointed by McKinley on March 16, 1900, and headed by William Howard Taft, was granted legislative as well as limited executive powers. On September 1, the Taft Commission began to exercise legislative functions. Between September 1900 and August 1902, it issued 499 laws, established a judicial system, including a supreme court, drew up a legal code, and organized a civil service. The 1901 municipal code provided for popularly elected presidents, vice presidents, and councilors to serve on municipal boards. The municipal board members were responsible for collecting taxes, maintaining municipal properties, and undertaking necessary construction projects; they also elected provincial governors. During these period, U.S., Spanish, and Mexican monies were all in local circulation. Commonwealth Act No. 1045 was promulgated in order to provide parity between these.

=== Establishment of civil government ===
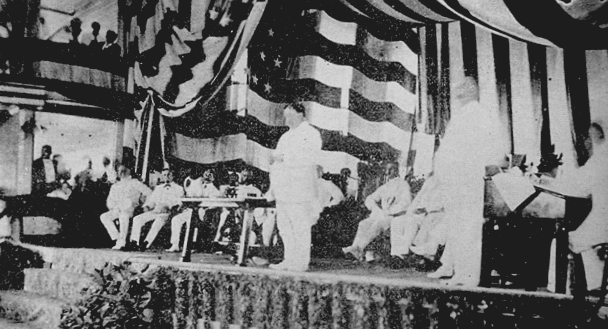
Governor General William Howard Taft addressing the audience at the Philippine Assembly in the Manila Grand Opera House

On March 3, 1901, the U.S. Congress passed the Army Appropriation Act containing (along with the Platt Amendment on Cuba) the Spooner Amendment which provided the president with legislative authority to establish a civil government in the Philippines. Up until this time, the president had been administering the Philippines by virtue of his war powers. On July 1, 1901, civil government was inaugurated with William H. Taft as the civil governor. Later, on February 3, 1903, the U.S. Congress would change the title of Civil Governor to Governor-General.

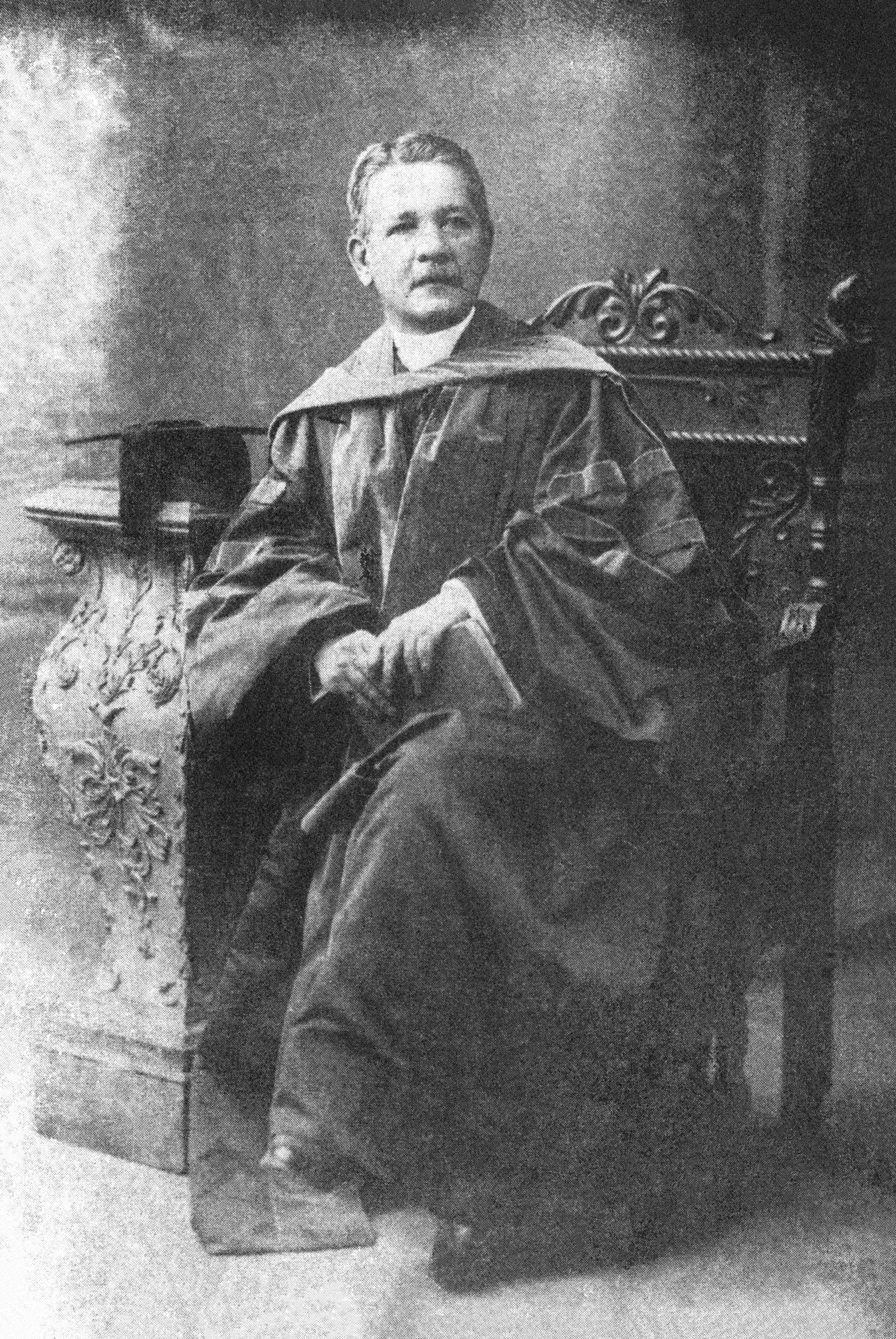
Cayetano Arellano, The 1st Chief Justice of the Philippines

A highly centralized public school system was installed in 1901, using English as the medium of instruction. This created a heavy shortage of teachers, and the Philippine Commission authorized the secretary of public instruction to bring to the Philippines 600 teachers from the U.S.—the so-called Thomasites. Free primary instruction that trained the people for the duties of citizenship and avocation was enforced by the Taft Commission per instructions of President McKinley. Also, the Catholic Church was disestablished, and a considerable amount of church land was purchased and redistributed.

An anti-sedition law was established in 1901, followed by an anti-brigandage law in 1902.

=== Official end to the war ===
The Philippine Organic Act of July 1902 approved, ratified, and confirmed McKinley's executive order establishing the Philippine Commission, and also stipulated that the bicameral Philippine Legislature would be established composed of an elected lower house, the Philippine Assembly, and the appointed Philippine Commission as the upper house. The act also provided for extending the U.S. Bill of Rights to the Philippines.

On July 2, 1902, the secretary of war telegraphed that the insurrection against the sovereign authority of the U.S. having come to an end, and provincial civil governments having been established, the office of military governor was terminated. On July 4, Theodore Roosevelt, who had succeeded to the U.S. presidency on September 14, 1901, after the assassination of President McKinley, proclaimed a full and complete pardon and amnesty to all persons in the Philippine archipelago who had participated in the conflict. An estimated 250,000 to 1 million civilians died during the war, mostly due to famine and disease.

On April 9, 2002, Philippine President Gloria Macapagal Arroyo proclaimed that the Philippine–American War had ended on April 16, 1902, with the surrender of General Miguel Malvar, and declared the centennial anniversary of that date as a national working holiday and as a special non-working holiday in the province of Batangas and in the cities of Batangas, Lipa, and Tanauan.

The Kiram–Bates Treaty secured the Sultanate of Sulu. American forces also established control over interior mountainous areas that had resisted Spanish conquest.

=== Post-1902 hostilities ===
Some sources have suggested that the war unofficially continued for nearly a decade, since bands of guerrillas, quasi-religious armed groups and other resistance groups continued to roam the countryside, still clashing with American Army or Philippine Constabulary patrols. American troops and the Philippine Constabulary continued hostilities against such resistance groups until 1913. Some of this resistance was from a claimed successor to the Philippines Republic. A 1907 law prohibited the display of flags and other symbols "used during the late insurrection in the Philippine Islands". Some historians consider these unofficial extensions to be part of the war.

== "Insular Government" (1900–1935) ==
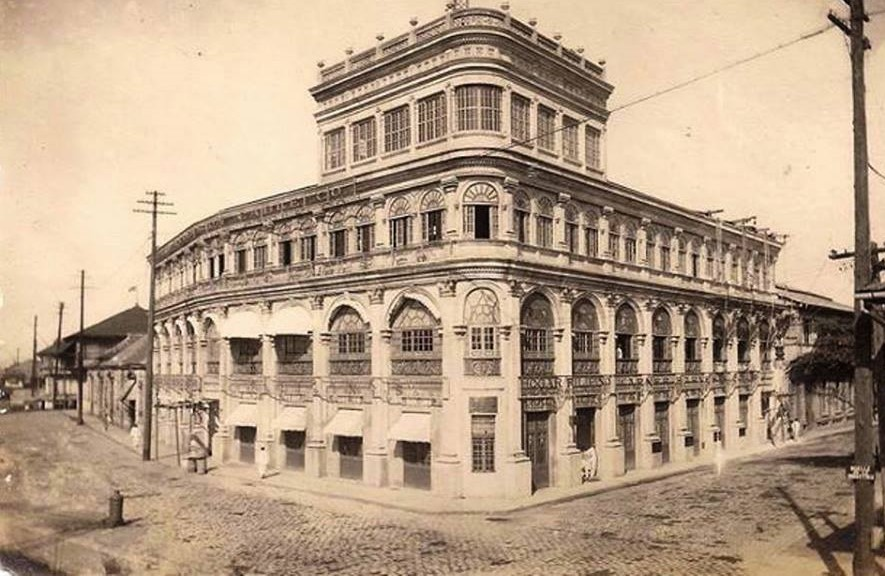
El Hogar Building, one of the earliest skyscrapers in Manila built during the Insular Government

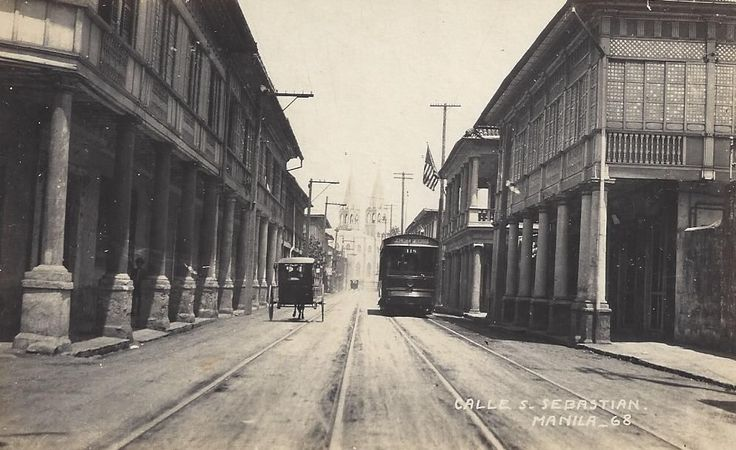
Pre–World War II tranvía line in Manila

The 1902 Philippine Organic Act was a constitution for the Insular Government, as the U.S. civil administration was known. This was a form of territorial government that reported to the Bureau of Insular Affairs. The act provided for a governor-general appointed by the U.S. president and an elected lower house, the Philippine Assembly. It also disestablished the Catholic Church as the state religion. The U.S. government, in an effort to resolve the status of the friars, negotiated with the Vatican. The church agreed to sell the friars' estates and promised gradual substitution of Filipino and other non-Spanish priests for the friars. It refused, however, to withdraw the religious orders from the islands immediately, partly to avoid offending Spain. In 1904, the administration bought for $7.2 million the major part of the friars' holdings, amounting to some 166,000 hectares (410,000 acres), of which one-half was in the vicinity of Manila. The land was eventually resold to Filipinos, some of them tenants but the majority of them estate owners. Under the Treaty of Paris, the U.S. agreed to respect existing property rights. They introduced a Torrens title system to track ownership in 1902, and in 1903 passed the Public Lands Act which modeled the Homestead Acts of the United States, and allowed individuals to claim land on the basis of a five-year residency. Both of these systems benefited larger landowners who were more able to take advantage of the bureaucracy, and only one tenth of homestead claims were ever approved.

While Philippine ports remained open to Spanish ships for a decade following the war, the U.S. began to integrate the Philippine economy with its own. In socio-economic terms, the Philippines made solid progress in this period. The 1909 U.S. Payne–Aldrich Tariff Act provided for free trade with the Philippines. Foreign trade had amounted to 62 million pesos in 1895, 13% of which was with the United States. By 1920, it had increased to 601 million pesos, 66% of which was with the United States. A health care system was established which, by 1930, reduced the mortality rate from all causes, including various tropical diseases, to a level similar to that of the United States itself. The practices of slavery, piracy and headhunting were suppressed but not entirely extinguished. Cultural developments strengthened the continuing development of a national identity, and Tagalog began to take precedence over other local languages.

Two years after completion and publication of a census, a general election was conducted for the choice of delegates to a popular assembly. An elected Philippine Assembly was convened in 1907 as the lower house of a bicameral legislature, with the Philippine Commission as the upper house. Every year from 1907 the Philippine Assembly and later the Philippine Legislature passed resolutions expressing the Filipino desire for independence.

American servicemen and their families celebrating a Passover Seder in Manila, 1925

Philippine nationalists led by Manuel L. Quezon and Sergio Osmeña enthusiastically endorsed the draft Jones Bill of 1912, which provided for Philippine independence after eight years, but later changed their views, opting for a bill which focused less on time than on the conditions of independence. The nationalists demanded complete and absolute independence to be guaranteed by the United States, since they feared that too-rapid independence from American rule without such guarantees might cause the Philippines to fall into Japanese hands. The Jones Bill was rewritten and passed Congress in 1916 with a later date of independence.

The law, officially the Philippine Autonomy Act but popularly known as the Jones Law, served as the new organic act (or constitution) for the Philippines. Its preamble stated that the eventual independence of the Philippines would be American policy, subject to the establishment of a stable government. The law maintained the governor-general of the Philippines, appointed by the president of the United States, but established a bicameral Philippine Legislature to replace the elected Philippine Assembly (lower house); it replaced the appointive Philippine Commission (upper house) with an elected senate.

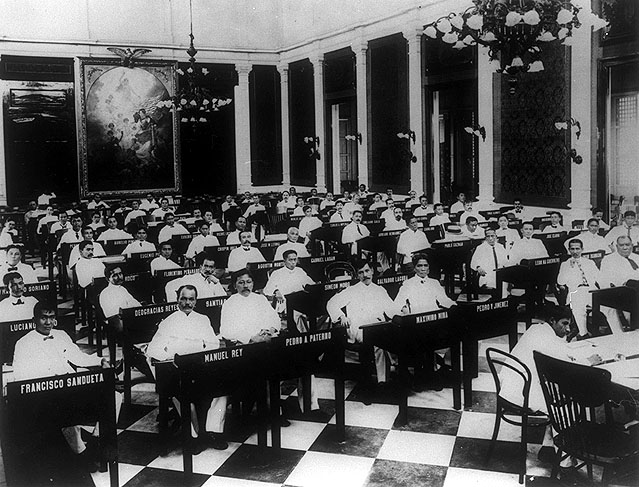
Philippine Legislature before 1924

The Filipinos suspended their independence campaign during the First World War and supported the United States against Germany. After the war they resumed their independence drive with great vigor. On March 17, 1919, the Philippine Legislature passed a "Declaration of Purposes", which stated the inflexible desire of the Filipino people to be free and sovereign. A Commission of Independence was created to study ways and means of attaining liberation ideal. This commission recommended the sending of an independence mission to the United States. The "Declaration of Purposes" referred to the Jones Law as a veritable pact, or covenant, between the American and Filipino peoples whereby the United States promised to recognize the independence of the Philippines as soon as a stable government should be established. U.S. Governor-General of the Philippines Francis Burton Harrison had concurred in the report of the Philippine legislature as to a stable government.

=== Independence missions ===
The Philippine legislature funded an independence mission to the U.S. in 1919. The mission departed Manila on February 28 and met in the U.S. with and presented their case to U.S. Secretary of War Newton D. Baker. U.S. President Woodrow Wilson, in his 1921 farewell message to Congress, certified that the Filipino people had performed the condition imposed on them as a prerequisite to independence, declaring that, this having been done, the duty of the U.S. was to grant the Philippines independence. The Republican Party then controlled Congress, and the recommendation of the outgoing Democratic president was not heeded.

After the first independence mission, public funding of such missions was ruled illegal. Subsequent independence missions in 1922, 1923, 1930, 1931, 1932, and two missions in 1933 were funded by voluntary contributions. Numerous independence bills were submitted to the U.S. Congress, which passed the Hare-Hawes-Cutting Bill on December 30, 1932. U.S. President Herbert Hoover vetoed the bill on January 13, 1933. Congress overrode the veto on January 17, and the Hare–Hawes–Cutting Act became U.S. law. The law promised Philippine independence after 10 years, but reserved several military and naval bases for the United States, as well as imposing tariffs and quotas on Philippine exports. The law also required the Philippine Senate to ratify the law. Manuel L. Quezon urged the Philippine Senate to reject the bill, which it did. Quezon himself led the twelfth independence mission to Washington to secure a better independence act. The result was the Tydings–McDuffie Act of 1934 which was very similar to the Hare-Hawes-Cutting Act except in minor details. The Tydings-McDuffie Act was ratified by the Philippine Senate. The law provided for the granting of Philippine independence by 1946.

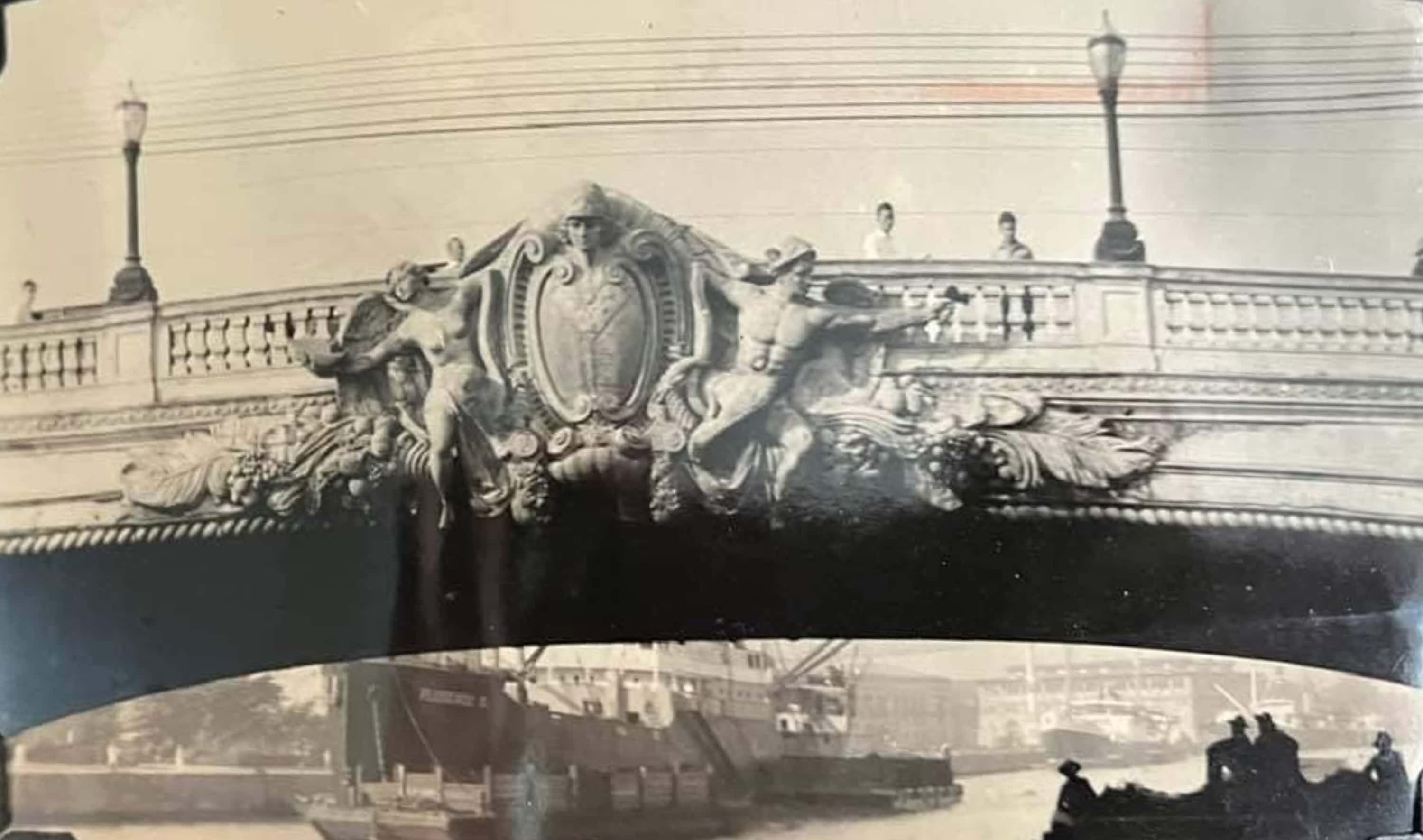
Jones Bridge Manila, named after William Atkinson Jones author of the Jones Act

The Tydings–McDuffie Act provided for the drafting and guidelines of a constitution, for a 10-year "transitional period" as the Commonwealth of the Philippines before the granting of Philippine independence. On May 5, 1934, the Philippine legislature passed an act setting the election of convention delegates. Governor-General Frank Murphy designated July 10 as the election date, and the convention held its inaugural session on July 30. The completed draft constitution was approved by the convention on February 8, 1935, approved by U.S. President Franklin Roosevelt on March 23, and ratified by popular vote on May 14. The first election under the constitution was held on September 17, and on November 15, 1935, the commonwealth was put into place.

== Philippine Commonwealth (1935–1946) ==
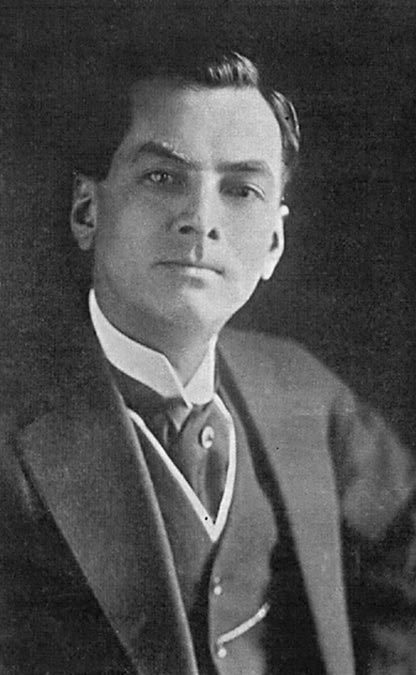
Manuel L. Quezon, once the president of the Senate of the Philippines (and the first to hold that office), was elected to become the first president of the Philippines during the Commonwealth era.

It was planned that the period 1935–1946 would be devoted to the final adjustments required for a peaceful transition to full independence, a great latitude in autonomy being granted in the meantime. Instead there was war with Japan, which postponed any plans for Philippine independence.

On May 14, 1935, an election to fill the newly created office of president of the Commonwealth of the Philippines was won by Manuel L. Quezon (Nacionalista Party), and a Filipino government was formed on the basis of principles superficially similar to the U.S. Constitution. The commonwealth as established in 1935 featured a very strong executive, a unicameral national assembly, and a supreme court composed entirely of Filipinos for the first time since 1901.

Quezon's priorities were defense, social justice, inequality and economic diversification, and national character. Tagalog was designated the national language, women's suffrage was introduced, and land reform mooted. The new government embarked on an ambitious agenda of establishing the basis for national defense, greater control over the economy, reforms in education, improvement of transport, the colonization of the island of Mindanao, and the promotion of local capital and industrialization. The commonwealth however, was also faced with agrarian unrest, an uncertain diplomatic and military situation in Southeast Asia, and uncertainty about the level of United States commitment to the future Republic of the Philippines. Amid growing landless peasant unrest in the late 1930s, the Commonwealth opened public lands in Mindanao and northeastern Luzon for resettlement.

In 1939–1940, the Philippine Constitution was amended to restore a bicameral Congress, and permit the re-election of President Quezon, previously restricted to a single, six-year term.

From 1940 to 1941, Philippine authorities, with the support of American officials, removed from office several mayors in Pampanga who were in favor of land reform. Following the 1946 election, some legislators who opposed giving the United States special economic treatment were prevented from taking office.

During the commonwealth years, the Philippines sent one elected resident commissioner to the United States House of Representatives, as Puerto Rico currently does today.

== Japanese occupation and World War II (1941–1945) ==
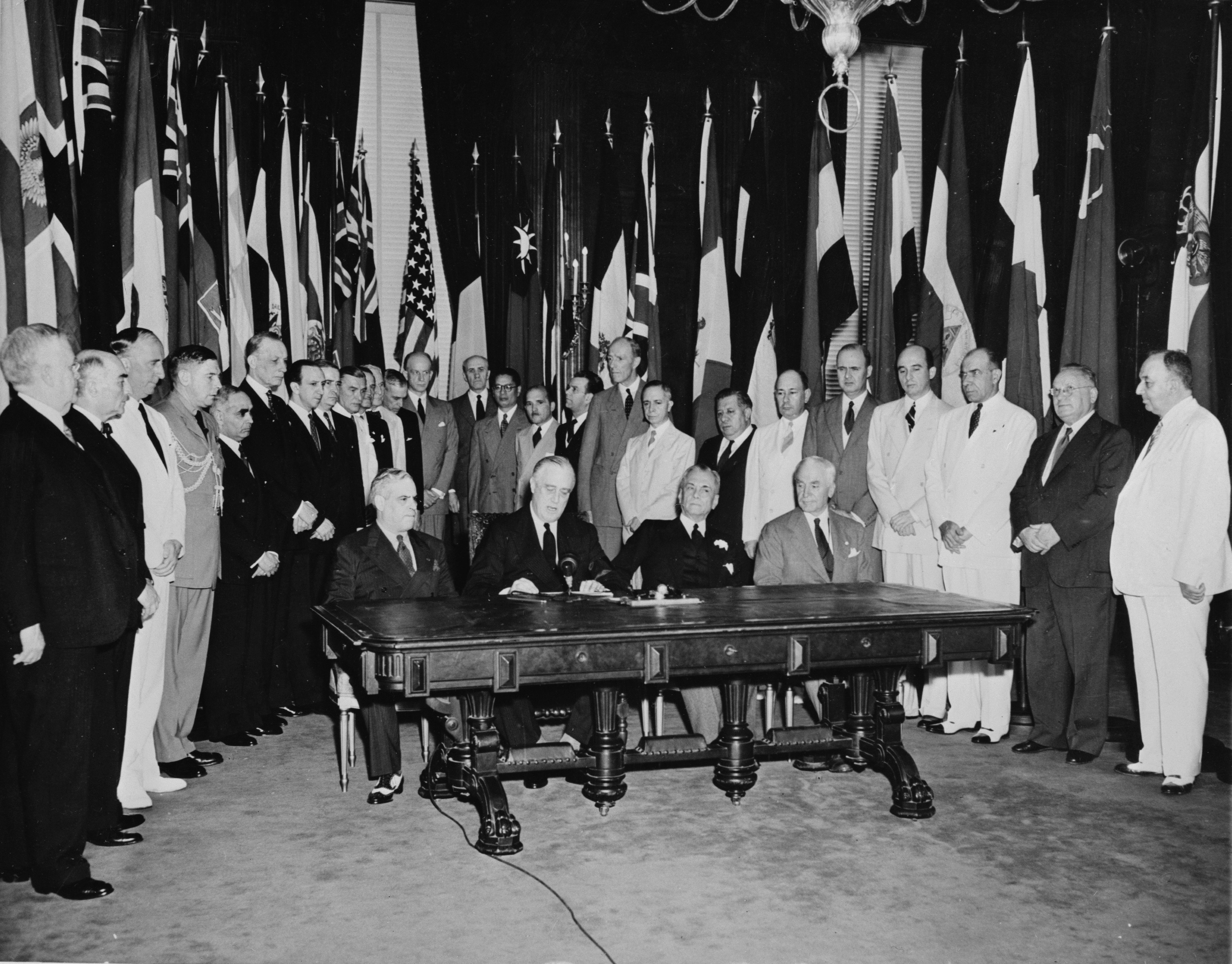
Exiled Philippine president Quezon sitting (second from the right) beside U.S. president Roosevelt, with representatives of 26 United Nations at Flag Day ceremonies at the White House to reaffirm their pact in 1942.

A few hours after the Japanese attack on Pearl Harbor on December 7, 1941, the Japanese launched air raids in several cities and U.S. military installations in the Philippines on December 8, and on December 10, the first Japanese troops landed in Northern Luzon. Filipino pilot Captain Jesús A. Villamor, leading a flight of three P-26 "Peashooter" fighters of the 6th Pursuit Squadron, distinguished himself by attacking two enemy formations of 27 planes each and downing a much-superior Japanese Zero, for which he was awarded the U.S. Distinguished Service Cross. The two other planes in that flight, flown by Lieutenants César Basa and Geronimo Aclan, were shot down.

As the Japanese forces advanced, Manila was declared an open city to prevent it from destruction, meanwhile, the government was moved to Corregidor. In March 1942, General MacArthur and President Quezon fled the country. Guerrilla units harassed the Japanese when they could, and on Luzon native resistance was strong enough that the Japanese never did get control of a large part of the island.

General Douglas MacArthur, commander of the United States Armed Forces in the Far East (USAFFE), was forced to retreat to Bataan. Manila was occupied by the Japanese on January 2, 1942. The fall of Bataan was on April 9, 1942, with Corregidor Island, at the mouth of Manila Bay, surrendering on May 6. Atrocities and war crimes were committed during the war, including the Bataan Death March and the Manila massacre.

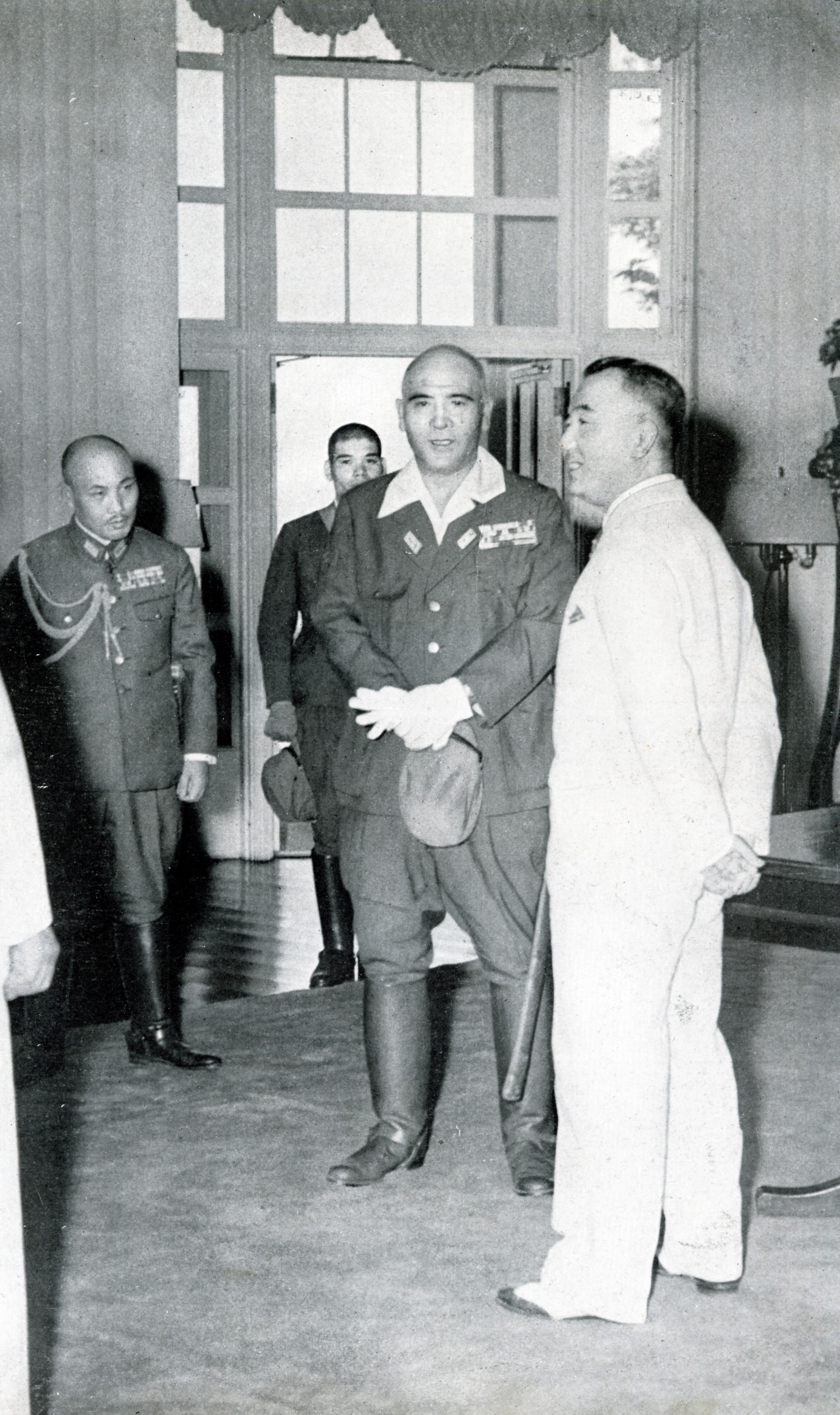
Meeting of Jorge B. Vargas, chair of the Philippine Executive Commission, and Homma Masaharu, a General Lieutenant of the Imperial Japanese Army on February 20, 1943

The commonwealth government by then had exiled itself to Washington, DC, upon the invitation of President Roosevelt; however many politicians stayed behind and collaborated with the occupying Japanese. The Philippine Commonwealth Army continued to fight the Japanese in a guerrilla war and were considered auxiliary units of the U.S. Army. Several Philippine Commonwealth military awards, such as the Philippine Defense Medal, Independence Medal, and Liberation Medal, were awarded to both the United States and Philippine Armed Forces.

The Second Philippine Republic, under Jose P. Laurel, was established as a puppet state. From 1942 the Japanese occupation of the Philippines was opposed by large-scale underground guerrilla activity. The Hukbalahap, a communist guerilla movement formed by peasant farmers in Central Luzon, did most of the fighting. The Hukbalahap, also known as Huks, resisted invaders and punished the people who collaborated with the Japanese, but did not have a well-disciplined organization, and were later seen as a threat to the Manila government. Before MacArthur came back, the effectiveness of the guerilla movement had decimated Japanese control, limiting it to only 12 out of the 48 provinces.

In April 1944, the discovery of the Koga papers by two fishermen of Carcar, Cebu from a crashed Japanese plane at sea led to MacArthur revising his plans in initiating the liberation of the Philippines, from a December landing in Sarangani Bay, Cotabato to an October landing in Leyte Gulf.

In October 1944, MacArthur had gathered enough additional troops and supplies to begin the retaking of the Philippines, landing with Sergio Osmeña who had assumed the presidency after Quezon's death. The Philippine Constabulary went on active service under the Philippine Commonwealth Army on October 28, 1944, during liberation under the commonwealth regime.

The largest naval battle in history, according to gross tonnage sunk, the Battle of Leyte Gulf, occurred when Allied forces began liberating the Philippines from the Japanese Empire. Battles on the islands entailed long fierce fighting and some of the Japanese continued to fight after the official surrender of the Empire of Japan on September 2, 1945.

After their landing, Filipino and American forces also undertook measures to suppress the Huk movement, which was founded to fight the Japanese Occupation. The Filipino and American forces removed local Huk governments and imprisoned many high-ranking members of the Philippine Communist Party. While these incidents happened, there was still fighting against the Japanese forces and, despite the American and Philippine measures against the Huk, they still supported American and Filipino soldiers in the fight against the Japanese.

Allied troops defeated the Japanese in 1945. By the end of the war it is estimated that over a million Filipinos (including regular and constable soldiers, recognized guerrillas and non-combatant civilians) died during the war. The 1947 final report of the High Commissioner to the Philippines documents massive damage to most coconut mills and sugar mills; inter-island shipping had all been destroyed or removed; concrete highways had been broken up for use on military airports; railways were inoperative; Manila was 80 percent destroyed, Cebu 90 percent, and Zamboanga 95 percent.

== Independence (1946) ==
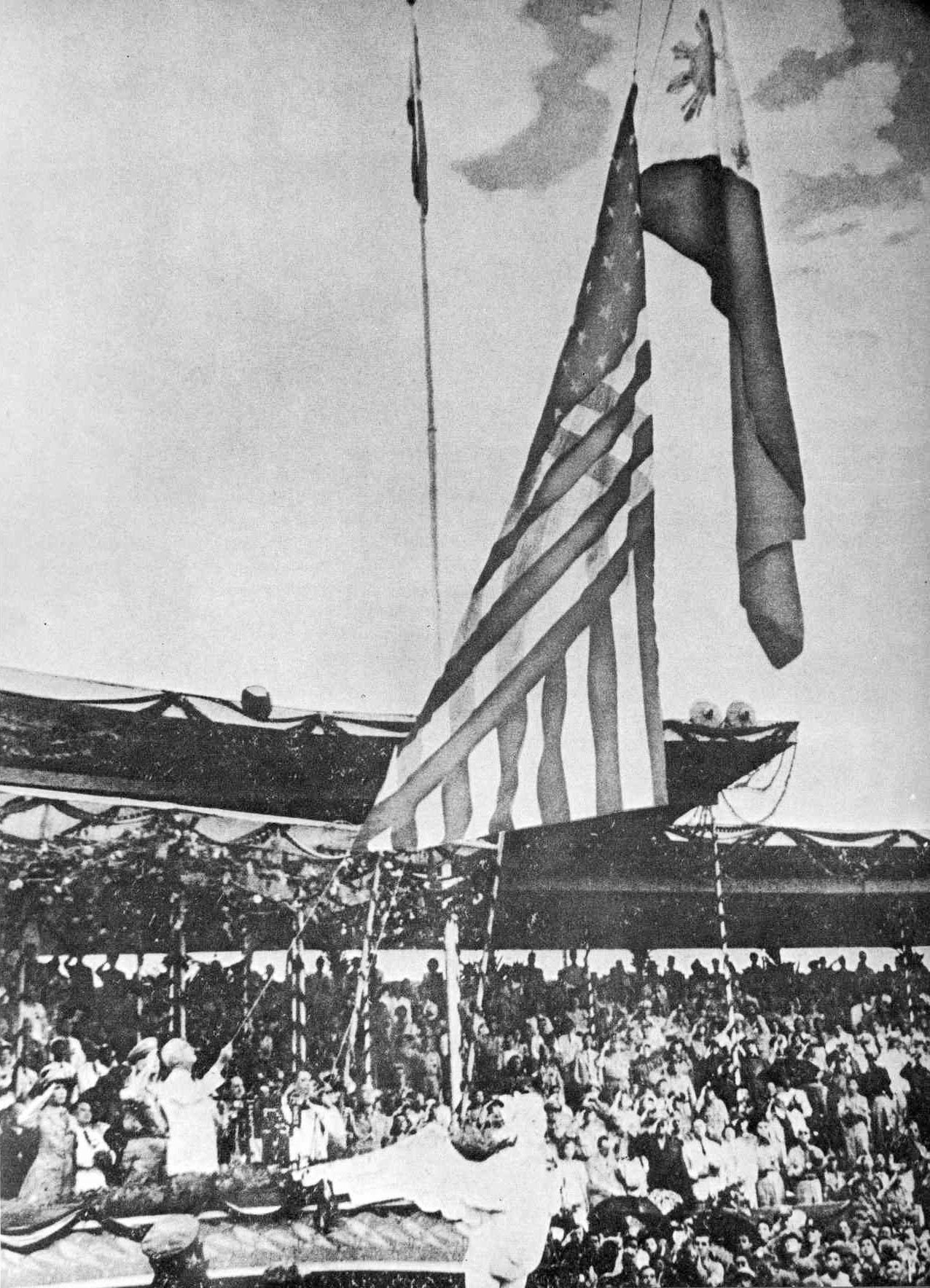
Philippine Independence, July 4, 1946. The Flag of the United States of America is lowered while the Flag of the Philippines is raised.

On October 11, 1945, the Philippines became one of the founding members of the United Nations. On July 4, 1946, the Philippines was officially recognized by the United States as an independent nation through the Treaty of Manila between the governments of the United States and the Philippine islands, during the presidency of Manuel Roxas. The treaty provided for the recognition of the independence of the Republic of the Philippines and the relinquishment of American sovereignty over the Philippine Islands. From 1946 to 1961, Independence Day was observed on July 4. On May 12, 1962, President Macapagal issued Presidential Proclamation No. 28, proclaiming Tuesday, June 12, 1962, as a special public holiday throughout the Philippines. In 1964, Republic Act No. 4166 changed the date of Independence Day from July 4 to June 12 and renamed the July 4 holiday as Philippine Republic Day.

== World War II veteran benefits ==
During World War II, over 200,000 Filipinos fought in defense of the United States against the Japanese in the Pacific theater of military operations, where more than half died. As a commonwealth of the United States before and during the war, Filipinos were legally U.S. nationals. With American nationality, Filipinos were promised all the benefits afforded to those serving in the armed forces of the United States. Despite this, Congress passed the Rescission Act (38 U.S.C. § 107), which stripped Filipinos of the benefits that they had been promised.

Since the passage of the Rescission Act, many Filipino veterans have traveled to the United States to lobby Congress for the benefits promised to them for their service and sacrifice. Sociologists introduced the phrase "Second Class Veterans" to describe the plight of these Filipino Americans. In 1993, numerous bills titled Filipino Veterans Fairness Act began to be introduced in Congress to return the benefits taken away from these veterans, but the bills only died in committee. The American Recovery and Reinvestment Act of 2009, signed into law on February 17, 2009, included provisions to pay benefits to the 15,000 remaining veterans.

On January 6, 2011, Jackie Speier (D-CA), U.S. Representative for California's 12th congressional district, serving since 2008, introduced a bill seeking to make Filipino World War II veterans eligible for the same benefits available to U.S. veterans. In a news conference to outline the bill, Speier estimated that approximately 50,000 Filipino veterans were alive.

== The U.S. military in the Philippines today ==
=== Presence of the U.S. military ===
The US military maintained a heavy presence in the Philippines until the closure of US bases in 1991/2. Many argue that a good relationship between the Philippine government and the U.S. military remains the only chance to lift the quality of life for Filipinos in poverty. There have been no fewer than twenty-three U.S. military bases in the Philippines since the passing of the Military Bases Agreement act in 1947. In addition to this, the U.S. has used the Philippines as landing area for intervention in wars in Asia such as the Vietnam War and the Korean War.

==== Visiting Forces Agreement ====
In 1998, the Visiting Forces Agreement permitted American forces in the Philippines for training exercises and returned former U.S. Army bases such as Subic Bay, Clark, and other smaller outposts under U.S. jurisdiction. The VFA legally protects American soldiers who commit crimes on Philippine soil. In 2006, a U.S. Marine was sentenced to 40 years in Philippine prison after the rape of a Filipino woman. The guilty Marine was transferred to the American Embassy, and then acquitted three years after.

== See also ==
- List of sovereign state leaders in the Philippines
- List of Philippine films of the 1930s
- Negros Revolution
- Republic of Negros
- Republic of Zamboanga
- Great Depression in the Philippines
