= Rescission =

Rescission is the noun form of the verb "to rescind." It may refer to:

- Rescission (contract law)
- Rescission bill, a procedure to rescind previously appropriated funding in the United States
- A synonym for repeal in parliamentary procedure
- Several bills which have used the term in their names:
  - The Rescissory Act 1661, by which the Scottish parliament annulled the legislation of the last twenty years, covering the time of the Commonwealth and Wars of the Three Kingdoms.
  - The Rescission Act of 1946, a United States law that retroactively annulled benefits that would have been payable to Filipino troops during the time that the Philippines was a U.S. territory
- "Rescission" (Battle for Dream Island), a 2011 animated web series episode
