= Filipino Veterans Fairness Act =

Proposed United States Congressional act

The Filipino Veterans Fairness Act is the name of a number of acts that have been introduced to the United States Congress in both the United States House of Representatives and the United States Senate since the 103rd Congress in 1993. Since then, nearly every session of Congress has seen a new version of the bill introduced. The purpose of these bills is to amend Title 38 of the United States Code to grant citizenship to Filipinos who have completed an enlistment in the United States Armed Forces; at least some versions of this bill would grant citizenship to other foreign nationals under the same provisions. Currently, every version of the bill introduced has died in committee. Despite this, the bill has been re-introduced in nearly every session of Congress since 1993.

== History of the Veteranos ==
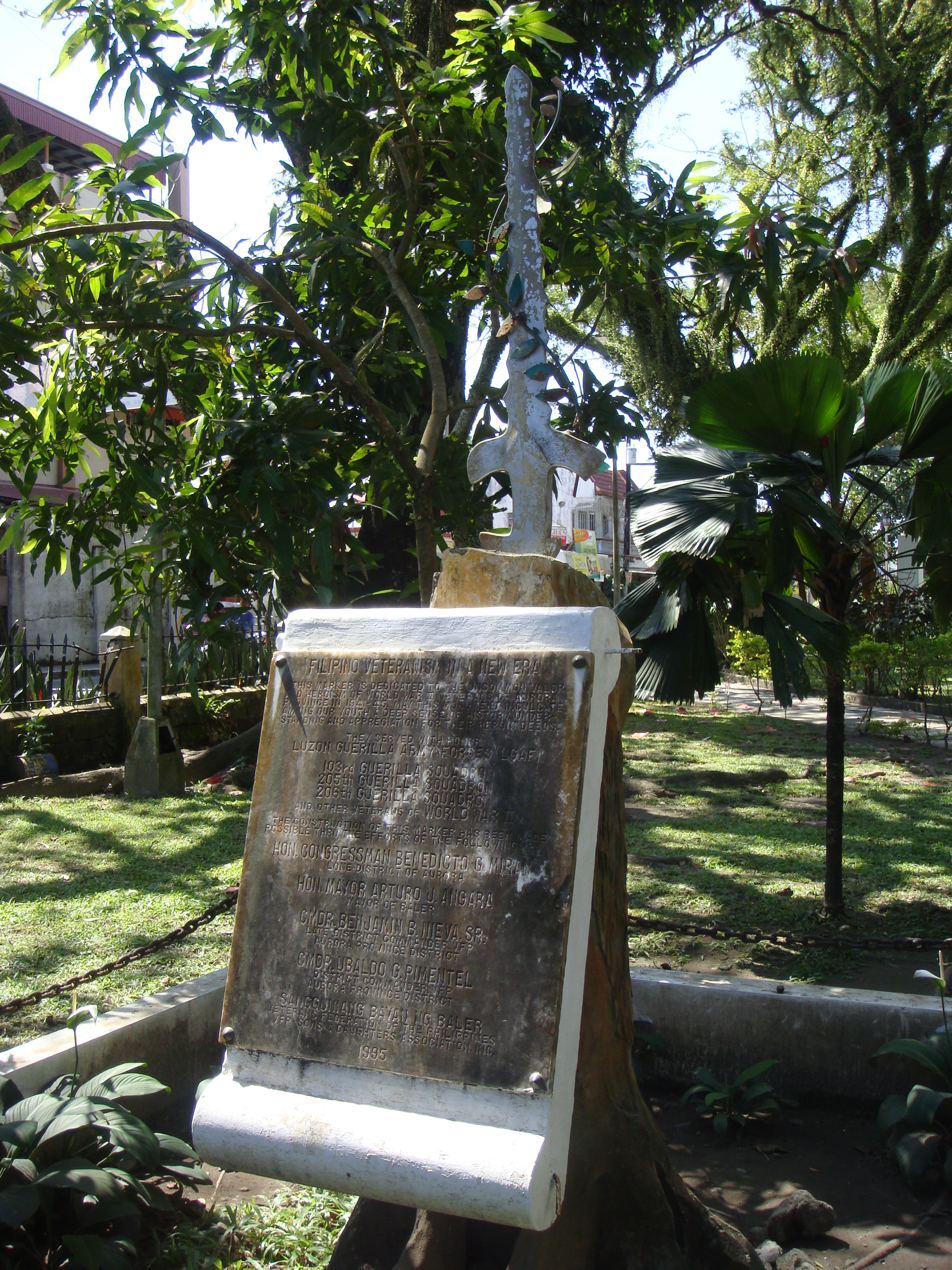
1995 World War II Aurora Veterans monument and memorial at Quezon Park, Baler, Aurora.

Filipinos, called veteranos, have fought as members of the American armed forces for over a century. Originally this was limited to U.S. nationals, Filipinos that had emigrated to the U.S. Under a special provision of the Base Agreement between the U.S. and the Republic of the Philippines, which allowed the U.S. to build bases and station troops in the host country, Filipino nationals are allowed to enlist in the U.S. armed forces. This arrangement is unique, under normal circumstances foreign nationals are not allowed to enlist in U.S. armed forces unless they are resident aliens of the United States. However, since Filipino enlistees are neither U.S. nationals nor resident aliens, they are not granted citizenship upon completion of their first enlistment, and are entitled to fewer benefits. Proponents of the bill often point out that thousands of Filipinos have enlisted so far (including many in the United States Army Forces in the Far East in World War II) and that ninety-percent choose to reenlist, even though they are the only non-citizen veterans that are not given citizenship upon completion of their enlistment. Since the bill has never made it out of committee, it is unknown what arguments might be used against it. The bill is widely supported by the Filipino-American community, as well as a US Conference of Mayors unanimous vote of passage for a resolution authored by Filipino-American Mayor Christopher Cabaldon that called for the full support of the Filipino Veterans Fairness Act. Most versions have been introduced by congressmen with Filipino-American communities among their constituents.

== The Bill ==
Since 1993, versions of this bill have been introduced to congress by members of both parties. All but the most recent version are dead, most died in committee before even being scheduled for debate. The bill is typically assigned to a veterans affairs committee after its introduction. The most recent version, introduced in the House of Representatives in 2007 is in committee and was scheduled for debate. It was never voted upon.

In June 2007, Mayor Christopher Cabaldon of West Sacramento proposed a resolution to the United States Conference of Mayors in support of the Filipino Veterans Act. The Cabaldon resolution was adopted by unanimous vote.

On January 17, 2008, Senators Daniel Inouye and Theodore Stevens made a courtesy call on President Gloria Macapagal Arroyo at Malacañang and assured her of the early passage of the Filipino Veterans Equity Bill to benefit 18,000 surviving World War II veterans. Executive secretary Eduardo Ermita, defense secretary Gilbert Teodoro, acting foreign affairs secretary Francisco Benedicto, Armed Forces chief of staff Gen. Hermogenes Esperon, Jr., US Ambassador Kristie Kenney, and US Deputy Chief of Mission Paul Jones. Arroyo conferred the Order of the Golden Heart with the Rank of Grand Cross on Stevens contributing to "the amelioration and improvement of the moral, social, and economic conditions of the Filipino people."

In February 2018, the bill was reintroduced by Senators Brian Schatz and Lisa Murkowski.

== Support by Lao and Hmong-American Veterans, and Other NGOs in Washington ==
The Filipino veterans efforts in Washington, D.C., and in the US Congress, have been repeatedly supported by Hmong- and Lao-American veterans groups who served with U.S. forces during the Vietnam War in Kingdom of Laos, as well as various non-profit, and non-governmental organizations (NGO)s, including the Lao Veterans of America, Inc.

== See also ==
- Filipino American
- Bataan Death March
- Lao Veterans of America
- Rescission Act of 1946
