= Rescission Act =

American law

Rescission Act of 1946
- Long title: An Act reducing or further reducing certain appropriations and contractual authorizations available for the fiscal year 1946, and for other purposes.
- Nicknames: Second Supplemental Surplus Appropriation Rescission Act, 1946
- Enacted by: the 79th United States Congress
- Effective: February 18, 1946

Citations
- Public law: Pub. L. 79–301
- Statutes at Large: 60 Stat. 6

Legislative history
- Signed into law by President Harry S. Truman on February 18, 1946

Major amendments
- American Recovery and Reinvestment Act of 2009

The Rescission Act of 1946 (Pub. L. 79–301, H.R. 5158, 60 Stat. 6, enacted February 18, 1946, codified at 38 U.S.C. § 107) is a law of the United States reducing (rescinding) the amounts of certain funds already designated for specific government programs, much of it for the U.S. military, after World War II concluded and as American military and public works spending diminished. The act was passed in anticipation of the scheduled recognition of Philippine independence on July 4, 1946.

The Recission Act authorized the transfer to the Philippine government of $200 million (equivalent to $2.51 billion today) that was previously appropriated to the U.S. Army for ordnance service and supplies to the Army of the Philippines, with the proviso that military service for the Philippines during World War II, while it was in service of the United States Army Forces in the Far East pursuant to the presidential Military Order of July 26, 1941, would not be considered to be military service for the United States.

The effect was to retroactively annul benefits to Filipino troops for their military service under the auspices of the United States while the Philippines was a U.S. unincorporated territory and Filipinos were U.S. nationals.

== Text of the act relevant to Filipino troops ==
TRANSFER OF APPROPRIATIONS

In addition to the transfers authorized by section 3 of the Military Appropriation Act, 1946, transfers of not to exceed the amounts hereinafter set forth may be made, with the approval of the Bureau of the Budget, from the appropriation "Ordnance Service and Supplies, Army", to the following appropriations:

...

Army of the Philippines, $200,000,000 : Provided, That service in the organized military forces of the Government of the Commonwealth of the Philippines, while such forces were in the service of the armed forces of the United States pursuant to the military order of the President of the United States dated July 26, 1941, shall not be deemed to be or to have been service in the military or naval forces of the United States or any component thereof for the purposes of any law of the United States conferring rights, privileges, or benefits upon any person by reason of the service of such person or the service of any other person in the military or naval forces of the United States or any component thereof, except benefits under (1) the National Service Life Insurance Act of 1940, as amended, under contracts heretofore entered into, and (2) laws administered by the Veterans' Administration providing for the payment of pensions on account of service-connected disability or death : Provided further, That such pensions shall be paid at the rate of one Philippine peso for each dollar authorized to be paid under the laws providing for such pensions : Provided further, That any payments heretofore made under any such law to or with respect to any member of the military forces of the Government of the Commonwealth of the Philippines who served in the service of the armed forces of the United States shall not be deemed to be invalid by reason of the circumstances that his service was not service in the military or naval forces of the United States or any component thereof within the meaning of such law.

== Background ==
In July 1941, Franklin D. Roosevelt federalized forces in the Philippines into service. During World War II, over 200,000 Filipinos fought in defense of the United States against the Japanese in the Pacific theater of military operations. As a commonwealth of the United States before and during the war, Filipinos were legally American nationals. With American nationality, Filipinos were promised all the benefits afforded to those serving in the armed forces of the United States.

== History ==
Efforts to end spending on Filipino veterans who served the Commonwealth of the Philippines, an American territory, were pushed forward by Senators Carl Hayden and Richard Russell Jr. after being informed that the veteran benefit costs were projected to be $3 billion ($54 billion, adjusted for inflation); Resident Commissioner Carlos P. Romulo spoke out against the legislation. In 1946, Congress passed the Rescission Act, stripping Filipinos of the benefits they were promised, replacing the estimated $3 billion in benefits with a single $200 million direct payment to the Philippine government. The Philippine Commonwealth President, Sergio Osmeña, wrote that the allocated $200 million was "inadequate for the payment of the benefits it intends to confer", and it was rejected by the Philippine government. Of the 66 countries allied with the United States during the war, only Filipinos were denied military benefits.

Between 1946 and 2009, other benefits for Filipino veterans of World War II were enacted. These include the construction of the Veterans Memorial Medical Center in Quezon City, and some funds for its operation and equipping. Other benefits include educational benefit extended to spouse and children, funding of assisted living care, as well as death benefits. In 1990, Filipino veterans gained the right to naturalize due to their military service, resulting in the naturalization of over 20,000 Filipino veterans. In 2003, Veteran Affairs health benefits were extended to Filipino American World War II veterans.

In 2009, Section 1002 of the American Recovery and Reinvestment Act provided for a one-time $15,000 lump sum for the surviving veterans who were American citizens, and a $9,000 lump-sum settlement for non-citizens. Acceptance of the payment would deny the payer any future benefits. By February 2016, more than $225 million had been paid out through 18,960 individual claims that had been granted, which make up a minority of 42,755 total claims made for the one-time payment. By August 2018, the number of claims granted increased to over 22,000.

== See also ==
- Attempts to overturn Rescission Act of 1946
- Filipino Veterans Fairness Act
- Filipino Americans during World War II
- Military history of the Philippines during World War II
- Resistance against Japanese occupation during World War II
