= 1949 Philippine Senate election =

11th Philippine senatorial election

- November 8, 1949

8 (of the 24) seats in the Senate 13 seats needed for a majority
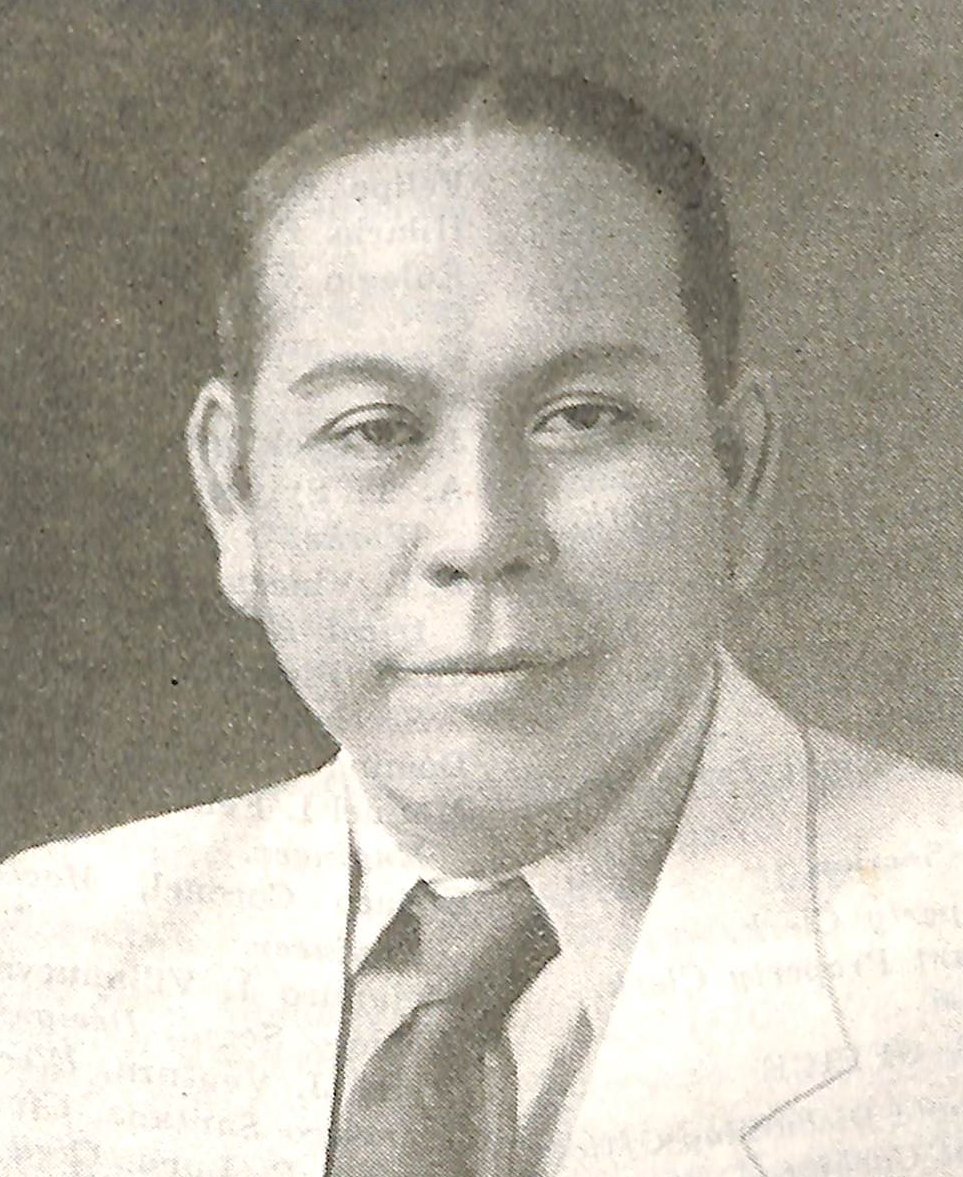

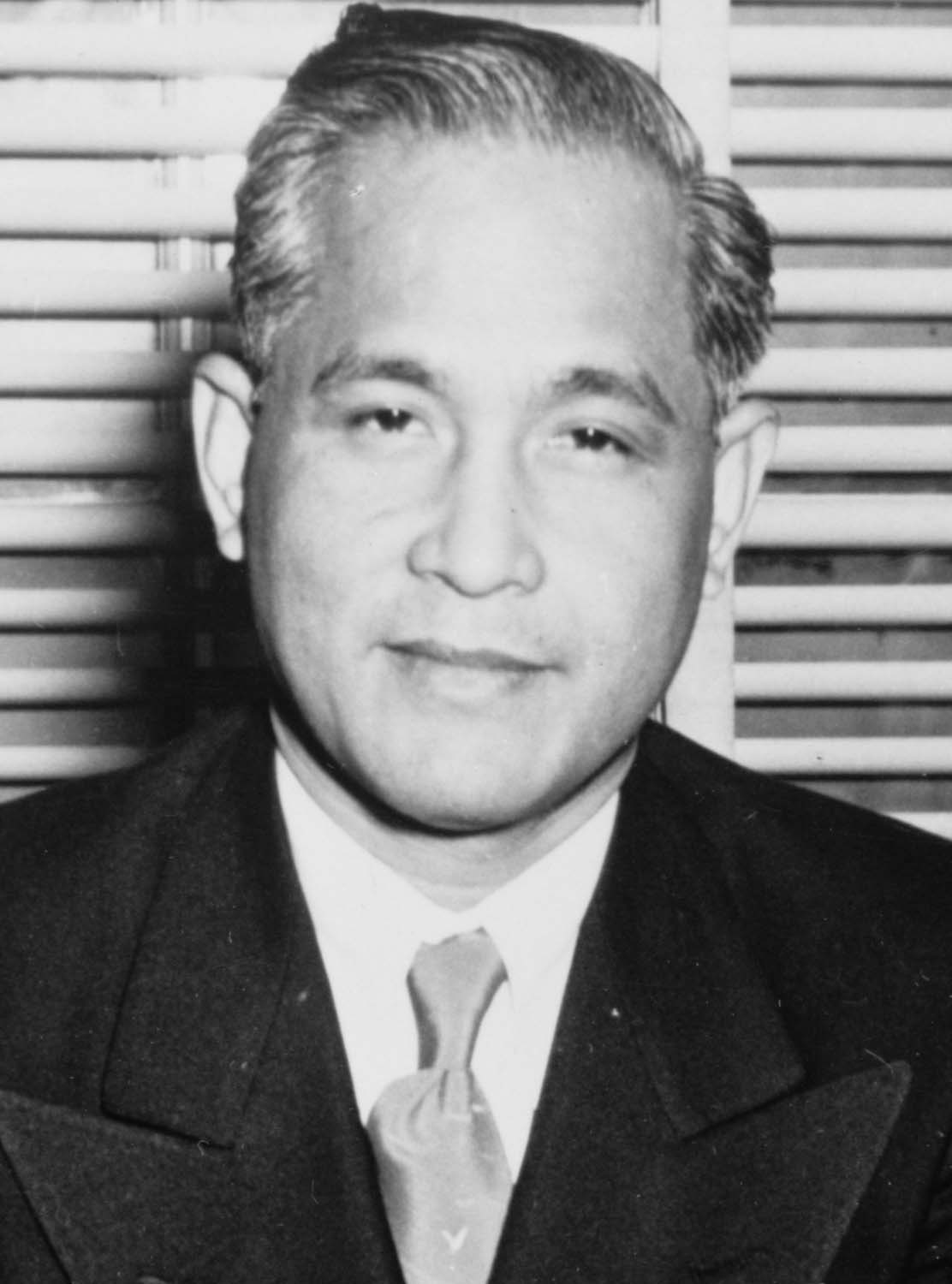
	Majority party	Minority party
Leader	Mariano Jesús Cuenco	Carlos P. Garcia
Party	Liberal	Nacionalista
Seats before	12 (2 up)	8 (4 up)
Seats won	8	0
Seats after	17	4
Seat change	▲5	▼4
Popular vote	12,782,449	8,900,568
Percentage	52.52	36.57
Swing	▼2.20	▼8.47
Senate President before election
Mariano Jesús Cuenco
Liberal
Elected Senate President
Mariano Jesús Cuenco
Liberal

The 11th election of members to the Senate of the Philippines was held on November 8, 1949. While President Elpidio Quirino won a full term as President of the Philippines after the death of President Manuel Roxas in 1948, and his running mate, Senator Fernando Lopez won as Vice President, their Liberal Party won all of the contested seats in the Senate. Despite factions created in the administration party, Quirino won a satisfactory vote from the public.

It was the only time in Philippine history where the duly elected president, vice president and senators all came from the same party, the Liberal Party.

Carlos P. Romulo and Marvin M. Gray, publisher of the Manila Evening News, accuse Quirino in their book The Magsaysay Story (The John Day Company, 1956, updated - with an additional chapter on Magsaysay's death - re-edition by Pocket Books, Special Student Edition, SP-18, December 1957) of widespread fraud and intimidation of the opposition by military action, calling it the "dirty election".

== Electoral system ==
Philippine Senate elections are held via plurality block voting with staggered elections, with the country as an at-large district. The Senate has 24 seats, of which 8 seats are up every 2 years. The eight seats up were won by the 9th to 16th placed candidates in 1946; each voter has eight votes and can vote up to eight names, of which the eight candidates with the most votes winning the election.

== Retiring incumbents ==
1. Alauya Alonto (Nacionalista)
2. Ramon Diokno (Nacionalista)
3. Prospero Sanidad (Liberal)

=== Incumbents running elsewhere ===
1. Fernando Lopez (Liberal), elected as vice president, left office on December 30, 1949

== Results ==
The Liberal Party wing led by President Elpidio Quirino (the "Quirinistas") won all 8 seats, shutting out the wing led by former Senate President Jose Avelino (the "Avelinistas"), and the Nacionalista Party.

Two incumbents, Tomas Cabili and Enrique Magalona of the Quirinistas defended their seats, while four incumbents, Avelinistas Olegario Clarin and Salipada Pendatun, and Alejo Mabanag and Jose O. Vera of the Nacionalistas lost their seats.

Newcomers include Esteban Abada, Teodoro de Vera, Justianiano Montano, Quinttin Paredes, Macario Peralta Jr. and Lorenzo Sumulong, all Quirinistas.

Senator Fernando Lopez ran and won in concurrent vice presidential elections. He left office on December 30, 1949, when his vice presidential term started.

	1	2	3	4	5	6	7	8	9	10	11	12	13	14	15	16	17	18	19	20	21	22	23	24
Before election													‡	‡	‡	‡	‡	‡	‡	‡				
Election result	Not up												LP								Not up			
After election	^												√	*	+	+	+	+	+	+				

Key:

- ‡ Seats up
- *+Gained by a party from another party
- √ Held by the incumbent
- * Held by the same party with a new senator
- ^ Vacancy

=== Per candidate ===
Candidate	Party	Votes	%
Quintin Paredes	Liberal Party (Quirino Wing)	1,756,898	49.07
Esteban Abada	Liberal Party (Quirino Wing)	1,685,520	47.07
Lorenzo Sumulong	Liberal Party (Quirino Wing)	1,615,124	45.11
Enrique Magalona	Liberal Party (Quirino Wing)	1,577,083	44.04
Tomas Cabili	Liberal Party (Quirino Wing)	1,575,075	43.99
Macario Peralta Jr.	Liberal Party (Quirino Wing)	1,566,376	43.75
Justiniano Montano	Liberal Party (Quirino Wing)	1,515,569	42.33
Teodoro de Vera	Liberal Party (Quirino Wing)	1,486,158	41.50
Claro M. Recto	Nacionalista Party	1,390,528	38.83
Alejo Mabanag	Nacionalista Party	1,150,818	32.14
Trinidad Legarda	Nacionalista Party	1,108,732	30.96
Jose O. Vera	Nacionalista Party	1,101,996	30.78
Jose Maria Veloso	Nacionalista Party	1,069,817	29.88
Marcelo Adduru	Nacionalista Party	1,053,754	29.43
Pedro Hernaez	Nacionalista Party	1,025,342	28.64
Domocao Alonto	Nacionalista Party	999,581	27.92
Jose T. Nueno	Liberal Party (Avelino Wing)	391,394	10.93
Salipada Pendatun	Liberal Party (Avelino Wing)	374,340	10.45
Olegario Clarin	Liberal Party (Avelino Wing)	346,921	9.69
Filemon Sotto	Liberal Party (Avelino Wing)	343,823	9.60
Felicidad Manuel	Liberal Party (Avelino Wing)	340,781	9.52
Aurelio Intertas	Liberal Party (Avelino Wing)	293,630	8.20
Jose Tando	Liberal Party (Avelino Wing)	291,550	8.14
Apolonio D. Curato	Liberal Party (Avelino Wing)	267,073	7.46
Leonardo Tenebro	Independent	4,592	0.13
Cesar Bulacan	Independent	1,531	0.04
Manuel P. Montalvo	Independent	388	0.01
Tito Estrella	Liberal Party (Quirino Wing)	269	0.01
Rosendo Zaldarriaga	Independent	94	0.00
Total		24,334,757	100.00
Total votes		3,580,688	–

=== Per party ===
The Liberals originally had 19 seats entering the 2nd Congress, but the election of Senator Fernando Lopez to the vice presidency meant that his seat is vacant until 1951, when it was contested in a special election.

Party	Votes	%	+/–	Seats				
Party	Votes	%	+/–	Up	Before	Won	After	+/−
Liberal Party (Quirino wing)	12,782,449	52.52	−2.20	2	12	8	17	+5
Nacionalista Party	8,900,568	36.57	−8.47	4	8	0	4	−4
Liberal Party (Avelino wing)	2,649,512	10.89	New	2	3	0	1	−2
Independent	4,123	0.02	New	0	0	0	0	0
Popular Front				0	1	0	1	0
Vacancy				0	0	0	1	+1
Total	24,336,652	100.00	–	8	24	8	24	0
Total votes	3,579,917	–						
Registered voters/turnout	5,135,814	69.70						

Vote share
LP (Quirino)	52.52%
NP	36.57%
LP (Avelino)	10.89%
Others	0.02%

Senate seats
LP (Quirino)	100%
NP	0%
LP (Avelino)	0%
Others	0%

== Defeated incumbents ==
1. Olegario Clarin (Liberal–Avelino wing) retired from politics
2. Alejo Mabanag (Nacionalista) ran in 1953 and won
3. Salipada Pendatun (Liberal–Avelino wing) ran in 1953 and lost, ran for House representative from Cotabato in 1957 and won
4. Jose O. Vera (Nacionalista) retired from politics

== See also ==
- Commission on Elections
- 2nd Congress of the Philippines
