= 1969 Philippine Senate election =

21st Philippine senatorial election

- November 11, 1969

8 (of the 24) seats in the Senate 13 seats needed for a majority
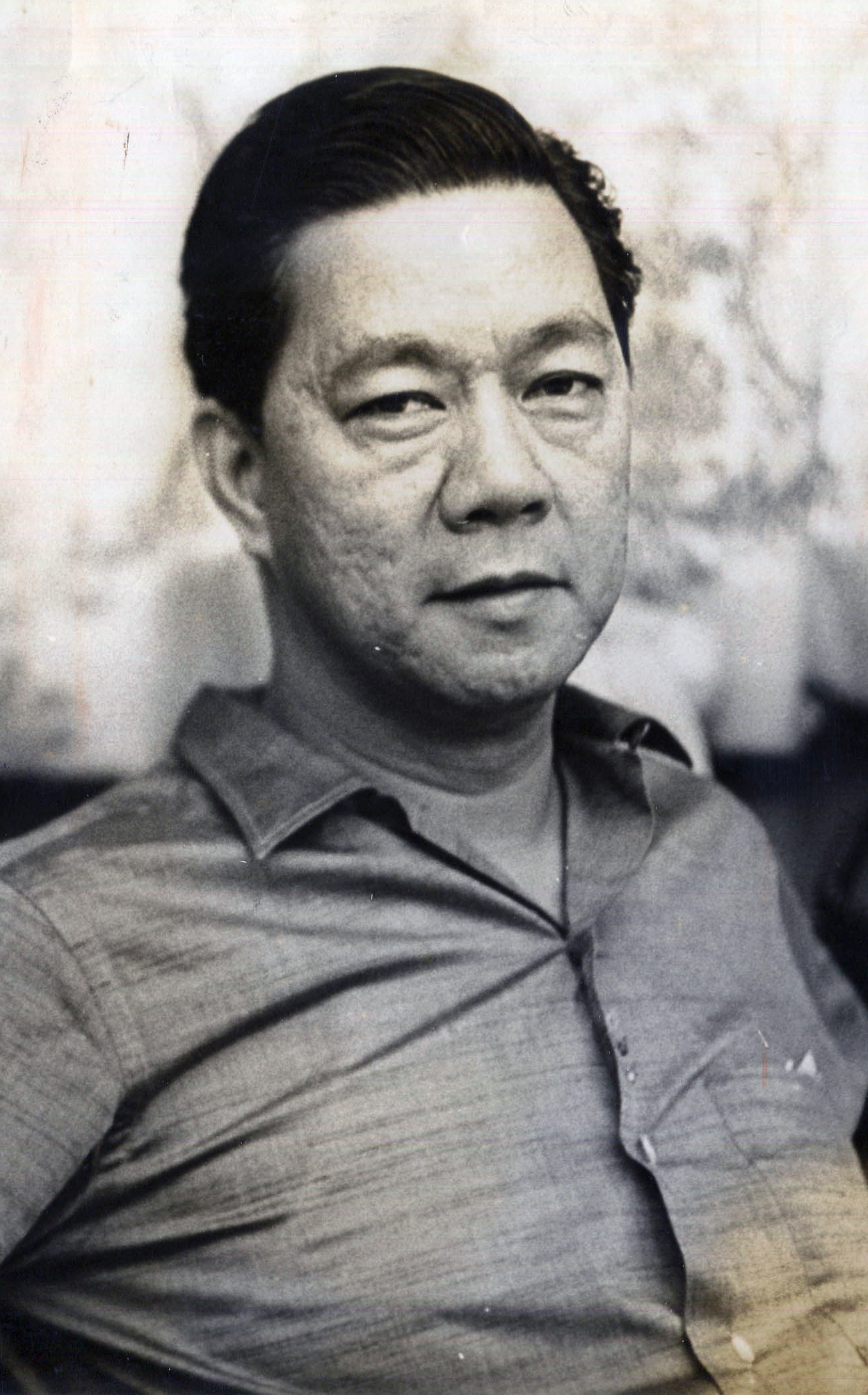

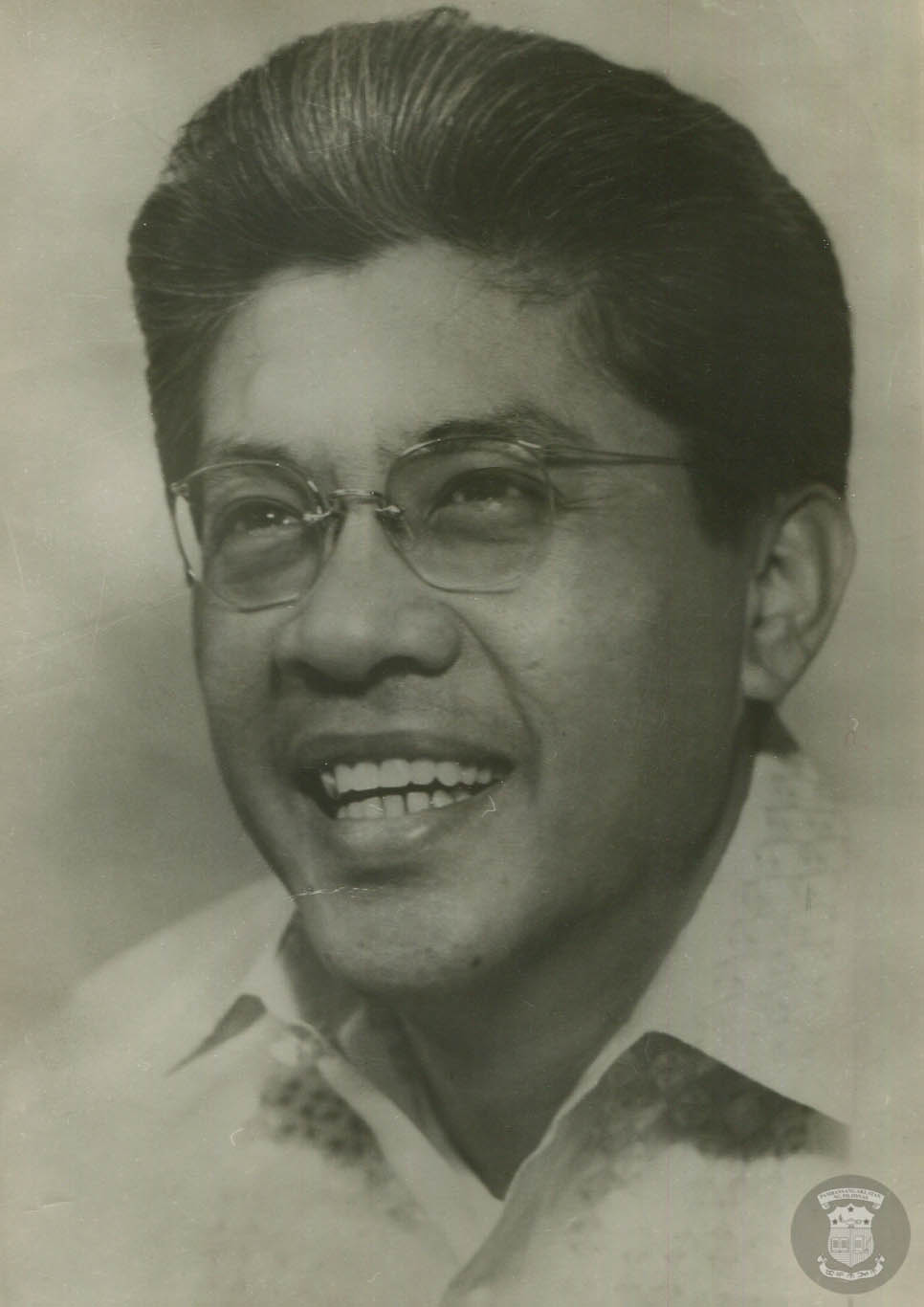
	Majority party	Minority party
Leader	Gil Puyat	Gerardo Roxas
Party	Nacionalista	Liberal
Seats before	15 (4 up)	8 (4 up)
Seats won	6	2
Seats after	17	6
Seat change	▲2	▼2
Popular vote	31,526,492	22,256,444
Percentage	58.58	41.35
Swing	▲2.62	▲4.32
Senate President before election
Gil Puyat
Nacionalista
Elected Senate President
Gil Puyat
Nacionalista

The 21st election of members to the Senate of the Philippines was held on November 11, 1969. Incumbent President Ferdinand Marcos won an unprecedented second full term as President of the Philippines, while his running mate, incumbent Vice President Fernando Lopez was also elected to a third full term as Vice President of the Philippines; their Nacionalista Party-mates also won six of the eight contested seats in the Philippine Senate increasing their majority in the Senate.

== Electoral system ==
Philippine Senate elections are held via plurality block voting with staggered elections, with the country as an at-large district. The Senate has 24 seats, of which 8 seats are up every 2 years. The eight seats up were last contested in 1963; each voter has eight votes and can vote up to eight names, of which the eight candidates with the most votes win the election.

== Retiring incumbents ==
There were no retiring incumbents in this election.

=== Incumbents running elsewhere ===
These ran in the middle of their Senate terms. For those losing in their respective elections, they can still return to the Senate to serve out their term, while the winners will vacate their Senate seats, then it would have been contested in a special election concurrently with the next general election.

1. Genaro Magsasysay (Liberal, elected as a Nacionalista), ran for vice president and lost
2. Sergio Osmeña Jr. (Liberal), ran for president and lost

== Results ==
The Nacionalista Party won six seats, while the Liberal Party won two.

Five incumbents successfully defended their seats. Liberals Ambrosio Padilla and Gerardo Roxas, and Nacionalistas José W. Diokno, Gil Puyat, and Arturo Tolentino.

Mamintal A.J. Tamano and Rene Espina of the Nacionalistas are the neophyte senators elected in this election.

Nacionalista Lorenzo Sumulong returns to the Senate after last serving in 1967.

Three senators lost their reelection bids: Juan Liwag and Tecla San Andres Ziga of the Liberals, and Nacionalistas' Rodolfo Ganzon.

	1	2	3	4	5	6	7	8	9	10	11	12	13	14	15	16	17	18	19	20	21	22	23	24
Before election					‡	‡	‡	‡	‡	‡	‡	‡												
Election result	Not up				LP		NP						Not up											
After election					√	√	+	+	+	√	√	√												

Key:

- ‡ Seats up
- + Gained by a party from another party
- √ Held by the incumbent
- * Held by the same party with a new senator

=== Per candidate ===
Candidate	Party	Votes	%
Arturo Tolentino	Nacionalista Party	4,826,809	58.84
Gil Puyat	Nacionalista Party	4,609,233	56.19
Jose W. Diokno	Nacionalista Party	4,566,353	55.67
Lorenzo Sumulong	Nacionalista Party	4,204,044	51.25
Ambrosio Padilla	Liberal Party	3,999,662	48.76
Gerry Roxas	Liberal Party	3,952,644	48.19
Rene Espina	Nacionalista Party	3,668,334	44.72
Mamintal A. J. Tamano	Nacionalista Party	3,458,193	42.16
Rafael Palmares	Nacionalista Party	3,393,677	41.37
Eddie Ilarde	Liberal Party	3,154,908	38.46
Rodolfo Ganzon	Nacionalista Party	2,799,849	34.13
Tecla San Andres Ziga	Liberal Party	2,742,113	33.43
Juan Liwag	Liberal Party	2,355,377	28.71
Gaudencio Mañalac	Liberal Party	2,250,665	27.44
Manuel Cases Jr.	Liberal Party	1,909,248	23.28
Vincenzo Sagun	Liberal Party	1,891,827	23.06
Roger Nite	Partido Bagong Pilipino	9,087	0.11
Ernesto Hidalgo	New Party	7,321	0.09
Marcelina M. Angeles	Partido ng Bansa	5,192	0.06
Antonio Mendoza	National Liberal Party	3,843	0.05
Elsie Bawisan	Partido ng Bansa	2,176	0.03
Petronilo Cordero	Partido ng Bansa	1,983	0.02
Avelina Pulido	Partido ng Bansa	1,837	0.02
Tanni Ibarra	Partido ng Bansa	1,624	0.02
Tomas Talania	Partido ng Bansa	1,477	0.02
Mauro Macaso	Partido ng Bansa	1,443	0.02
Alejandro Gador	Partido ng Manggagawa/Labor Party	1,440	0.02
Estrada Jakosalem	New Leaf Party	947	0.01
Leopoldo Relayson	Partido ng Bansa	793	0.01
Total		53,822,099	100.00
Total votes		8,202,793	–
Registered voters/turnout		10,300,898	79.63

=== Per party ===
Party	Votes	%	+/–	Seats				
Party	Votes	%	+/–	Up	Before	Won	After	+/−
Nacionalista Party	31,526,492	58.58	+2.82	4	15	6	17	+2
Liberal Party	22,256,444	41.35	+4.32	4	8	2	6	−2
Partido ng Bansa	16,525	0.03	−0.02	0	0	0	0	0
Partido Bagong Pilipino	9,087	0.02	New	0	0	0	0	0
National Liberal Party	3,843	0.01	New	0	0	0	0	0
New Party	7,321	0.01	New	0	0	0	0	0
Partido ng Manggagawa/Labor Party	1,440	0.00	New	0	0	0	0	0
New Leaf Party	947	0.00	New	0	0	0	0	0
Nationalist Citizens' Party				0	1	0	1	0
Total	53,822,099	100.00	–	8	24	8	24	0
Total votes	8,202,793	–						
Registered voters/turnout	10,300,898	79.63						

Vote share
NP	58.58%
LP	41.35%
Others	0.07%

Senate seats
NP	75.00%
LP	25.00%
Others	0.00%

== Defeated incumbents ==
1. Rodolfo Ganzon (Nacionalista), ran for mayor of Iloilo CIty in 1971 and won
2. Juan Liwag (Liberal), ran for delegate at the Constitutional Convention in 1970 and won
3. Tecla San Andres Ziga (Liberal), retired from politics

== See also ==
- Commission on Elections
- 7th Congress of the Philippines
