= Philippine Senate elections =

System of national at-large voting for the Congressional upper house

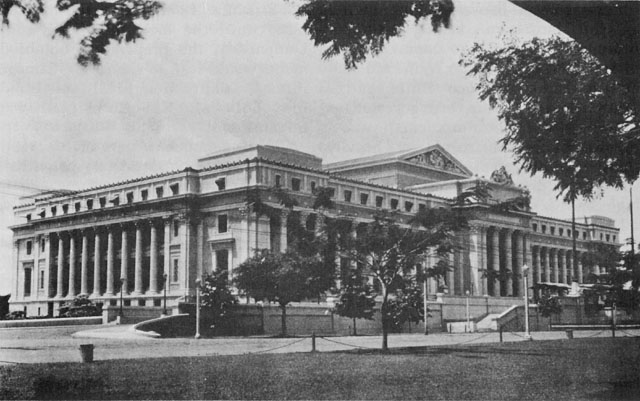
The Senate, when it existed, met at the Old Legislative Building from 1918 to 1941, from 1949 to 1973, and from 1987 to 1997.

Elections to the Senate of the Philippines are done via plurality-at-large voting; a voter can vote for up to twelve candidates, with the twelve candidates with the highest number of votes being elected. The 24-member Senate uses staggered elections, with only one-half of its members up for election at any given time, except for special elections, which are always held concurrently with regularly scheduled elections.

== Manner of choosing candidates ==
With the advent of the nominal multi-party system in 1987, political parties have not been able to muster enough candidates to fill their 12-person slate. This means they have to join coalitions or alliances in order to present a full slate. If a slate is still not complete, "guest candidates" may be invited, even from rival slates. A guest candidate may not be compelled to join the campaign rallies of the slate that invited him/her. A party may even not include their entire ticket to a coalition slate, or assign their candidates to competing slates. A candidate may defect from one slate to another or be unaffiliated with any slate while the campaign is ongoing. The Commission on Elections uses the names of the political parties on the ballot.

Once elected, the parties involved in the different slates may form alliances with one another totally different from the alliances prior to the election.

In Third Republic elections under the nominal two-party system, the Liberal Party and the Nacionalista Party often presented complete 8-person tickets; a party may even exceed the 8-person slate due to perceived popularity. The first instance of having guest candidates was in 1955, when the opposition Liberals adopted Claro M. Recto of the Nacionalista Party, who had also opposed the presidency of Ramon Magsaysay. Parties having guest candidates was seen as a weakness of finding candidates within their ranks.

== Manner of election ==
=== 1916 to 1935 ===
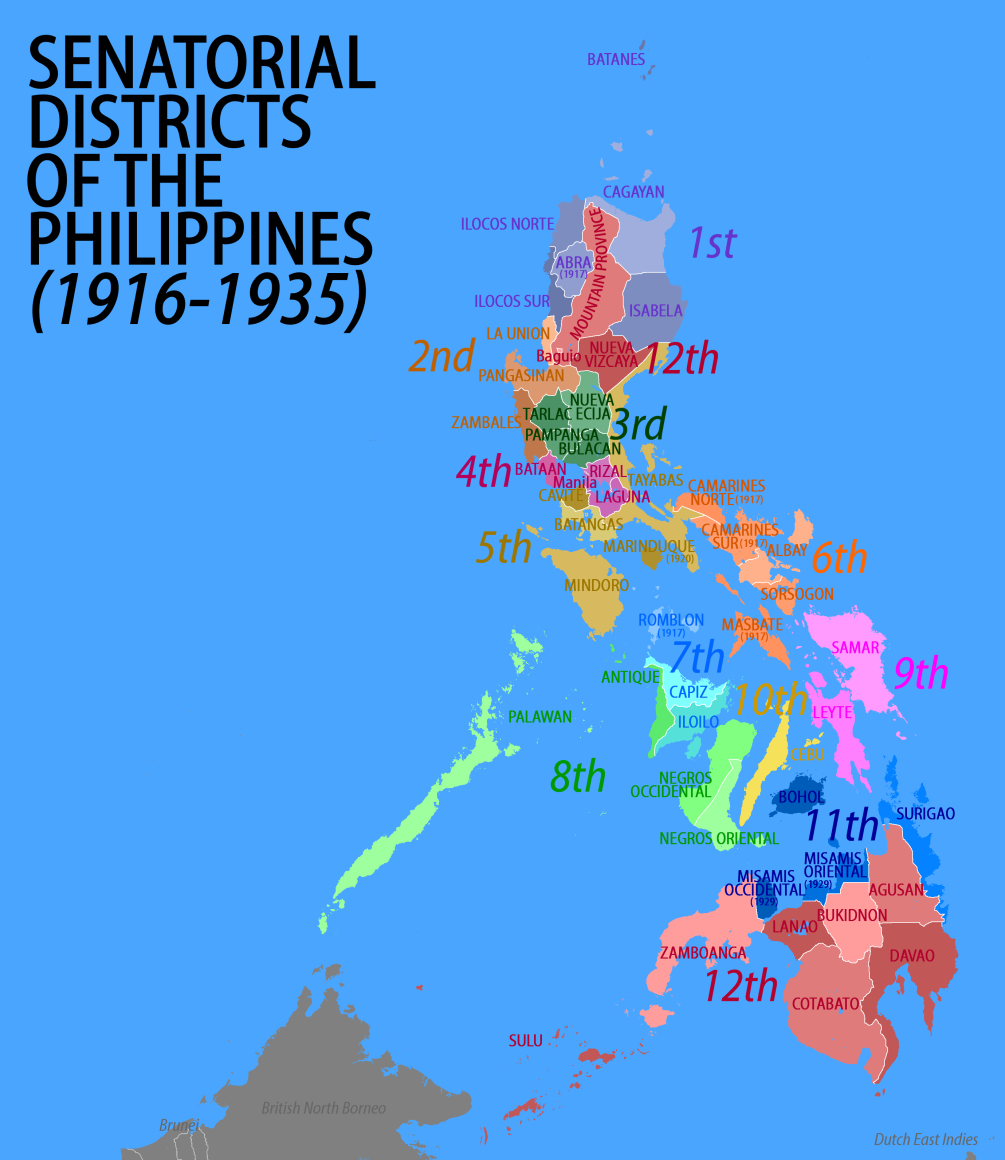
Map of the senatorial districts.

From 1916 to 1934, the country was divided into 12 senatorial districts. Eleven of these districts elected two senators each. In 1916, each district elected two senators (plurality-at-large): one was to serve a six-year term, the other a three-year term. On each election thereafter, one seat per district was up (first past the post). The senators from the 12th district were appointed by the American governor-general for no fixed term.

In 1935, the electorate approved in a plebiscite a new constitution that abolished the Senate and instituted a unicameral National Assembly of the Philippines. The members of the Constitutional Convention originally wanted bicameralism but could not agree on how the senators shall be elected: via the senatorial districts or being nationally elected.

=== 1941 to 1949 ===
The electorate in 1940 approved in a plebiscite amendments to the constitution that restored the bicameral Congress of the Philippines, including the Senate. Elections for the Senate were held on every second Monday of November of every odd-numbered year; however, the old senatorial districts were not used anymore; instead, the 24-member Senate was to be elected on a nationwide at-large basis. As the first election in the new setup, the voters in the 1941 election voted for 24 senators. However, they were also given the option of writing the party's name on the ballot, wherein all of the candidates of the party would receive votes. With the 24 candidates with the most votes winning in the election, the ruling Nacionalista Party won all 24 seats in a landslide victory. The winners included Rafael Martinez, who replaced Norberto Romualdez, who died the day before the election; Martinez won because of voters who had selected the party, rather than specifying a particular candidate.

Due to World War II, Congress was not able to convene until June 1945. President Sergio Osmeña called for special sessions to convene the 1st Congress of the Commonwealth of the Philippines until elections could be organized. Originally, to observe the staggered terms, the eight candidates with the most votes were to serve for eight years, the next eight for four years, and still the next eight for two years. However, several members had died and others were disqualified because they were charged with collaboration with the Japanese, so the Senate conducted a lottery to determine which senators would serve until 1946 and which would serve until 1947. In the 1946 election, voters elected 16 senators; the first eight candidates with the highest number of votes were to serve until 1951, the next eight were to serve until 1949.

=== 1951 to 1971 ===
The Senate chamber at the Old Congress building: Cipriano P. Primicias, Sr., far left, debates Quintín Paredes, far right. In the center are, from left to right, Justiniano Montano, Mariano Jesús Cuenco, Enrique B. Magalona, and Francisco Delgado. In the foreground is Edmundo Cea.

Electoral reform enacted in 1951 eliminated block voting, which had given voters the option of writing the party's name on the ballot. In a 1951 election, voters voted for eight senators for the first time and each voter had to write at most eight names for senator (writing the party's name would result in a spoiled vote). Noting that after the elimination of block voting, many people voted for a split ticket, political scientist David Wurfel has remarked that "The electoral reform of 1951 was thus one of the most important institutional changes in the postwar Philippines, making the life of the opposition easier."

On September 23, 1972, President Ferdinand Marcos declared martial law and assumed legislative powers. In a 1973 plebiscite, the electorate approved a new constitution that abolished Congress and replaced it with a unicameral National Assembly, which would ultimately be the Batasang Pambansa (parliament).

=== 1987 to present ===
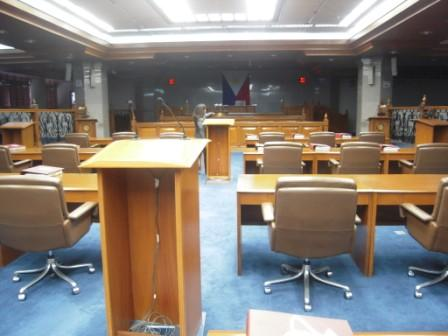
The GSIS building: The Senate session hall.

Marcos was overthrown as a result of the 1986 People Power Revolution. The new president, Corazon Aquino, appointed a Constitutional Commission to write a new constitution. The electorate approved the constitution in 1987, restoring the bicameral Congress. Instead of electing 8 senators every two years, the new constitution provided that 12 senators would be elected every three years. As part of the transitory provisions, the voters elected 24 senators in the 1987 election, to serve until 1992. In the 1992 election, the voters still voted for 24 candidates, but the first 12 candidates with the most votes were to serve until 1998, while the next 12 were to serve only until 1995. Thereafter, 12 candidates are elected every second Monday of May every third year since 1995.

=== Summary ===
Elections	Elected	Seats per district	Districts	Total seats	Candidates
1916	22	2	11	24	
1919	11	1	11	24	
1922	11	1	12	24	
1925	11	1	12	24	
1928	11	1	12	24	
1931	11	1	12	24	
1934	11	1	12	24	
Senate abolished from 1935 to 1941. Senators elected in 1941 will not serve until 1945.
1941	24 (Note: Out of the 24 senators-elect, the first eight candidates with the highest number of votes will serve for six years, the next eight for four years, and the next eight for two years. However, this was not followed due to the intervention of World War II. The senators in 1945 drew lots on who would be serving until 1946, and until 1947.)	24	1	24	103
1946	16 (Note: Out of the 16 senators-elect, the first eight candidates with the highest number of votes will serve for six years, and the next eight for four years.)	16	1	24	57
1947	8	8	1	24	24
1949	8	8	1	24	26
1951	8+1 special (Note: A special election for the seat vacated by Fernando Lopez who was elected vice president in 1949 was held.)	9	1	24	20+4
1953	8	8	1	24	20
1955	8+1 special (Note: A special election for the seat vacated by Carlos P. Garcia who was elected vice president in 1953 was held.)	9	1	24	21+3
1957	8	8	1	24	54
1959	8	8	1	24	32
1961	8	8	1	24	22
1963	8	8	1	24	19
1965	8	8	1	24	30
1967	8	8	1	24	29
1969	8	8	1	24	29
1971	8	8	1	24	16
Senate abolished from 1972 to 1987.
1987	24	24	1	24	91
1992	24 (Note: Out of the 24 senators-elect, the first twelve candidates with the highest number of votes will serve for six years, and the next twelve for three years.)	24	1	24	164
1995	12	12	1	24	30
1998	12	12	1	24	40
2001	12+1 special (Note: Teofisto Guingona, Jr. was appointed vice president on 2001; the thirteenth-placed candidate in the election will serve for Guingona's unexpired term of three years.)	13	1	24	37
2004	12	12	1	24	48
2007	12	12	1	24	37
2010	12	12	1	24	61
2013	12	12	1	24	33
2016	12	12	1	24	50
2019	12	12	1	24	62
2022	12	12	1	24	64
2025	12	12	1	24	66

== List of results ==
=== Senatorial districts era ===
Election	Nacionalista	Progresista	Democrata	Colectivista	Pro- Independencia	Consolidato	Independents	Total
1916	22	1					1	24
1919	21		1				2	24
1922	12		5	3			4	24
1925	5		8	3	6		2	24
1928	24		0	3				24
1931	6		4				2	12
1934	6		17				1	24

=== At-large era ===
In this table, the "administration" ticket is the ticket supported by the sitting president.

In 1992, Corazon Aquino who was nominally supporting the LDP, supported the presidential candidacy of Fidel V. Ramos of Lakas, making the "administration ticket" ambiguous.

In 2021, ruling party PDP–Laban nominated Senator Bong Go for president, and President Rodrigo Duterte for vice president. Later on, Senator Ronald dela Rosa filed his candidacy to run for president under PDP–Laban, while Go as his vice president. There were suggestions that Davao City Mayor Sara Duterte, the president's daughter, substitute for dela Rosa. Instead, dela Rosa withdrew his presidential candidacy, Go then withdrew his vice presidential bid to avoid complications with Sara's vice presidential candidacy under Lakas–CMD, then Go became the presidential nominee of Pederalismo ng Dugong Dakilang Samahan, with President Duterte filing to run for senator, then endorsing his daughter for vice president. In the end, both Go and President Duterte withdrew, and several figures in the Duterte administration were either senatorial candidates of the PDP–Laban backed Tuloy ang Pagbabago slate, or Mayor Duterte's UniTeam Alliance, making the "administration ticket" ambiguous.

Election	Administration ticket		Primary opposition ticket		Others	
Election	Seats won	Vote %	Seats won	Vote %	Seats won	Vote %
1941	24 Nationalistas					
1946	7 Nacionalistas (Conservative wing)	40.81	8 Nacionalistas (Liberal wing)	47.26%	1 Popular Front	6.56%
1947	6 Liberals	54.72	2 Nacionalistas	45.04		
1949	8 Liberals	52.52	0 Nacionalistas	36.57		
1951	0 Liberals	38.19	9 Nacionalistas	58.20		
1953	0 Liberals	35.97	5 Nacionalistas	39.83	2 Democrats; 1 Citizens'	15.40; 8.75
1955	9 Nacionalistas	67.18	0 Liberals	32.71		
1957	6 Nacionalistas	47.28	2 Liberals	31.70		
1959	5 Nacionalistas	45.04	2 Liberals	28.92	1 NCP	5.92
1961	2 Nacionalistas	45.07	4 Liberals	37.88	2 Progressives	16.62
1963	4 Liberals	49.76	4 Nacionalistas	50.17		
1965	2 Liberals	46.92	5 Nacionalistas	43.82	1 NCP	6.11
1967	6 Nacionalistas	55.75	1 Liberal	37.04	1 Independent Nacionalista	7.10
1969	6 Nacionalistas	58.58	2 Liberals	41.35		
1971	2 Nacionalistas	42.58	6 Liberals	57.42		
1987	22 Lakas ng Bayan	64.89	2 GAD	26.16		
1992	16 LDP	44.95	5 NPC	18.07	2 Lakas ng Bayan; 1 Liberal/PDP–Laban	17.67; 6.92
1995	9 Lakas–Laban Coalition	67.71	3 NPC	30.67		
1998	5 Lakas	45.44	7 LAMMP	44.54		
2001	8 People Power Coalition	50.81	4 Puwersa ng Masa	39.12	1 Independent	9.18
2004	7 K4	52.24	5 KNP	37.74		
2007	2 TEAM Unity	36.76	8 GO	50.87	1 Liberal; 1 independent	5.40; 5.33
2010	2 Lakas-Kampi	12.83	4 Aquino–Roxas slate	32.72	3 Villar–Legarda slate 2 Estrada–Binay slate 1 NPC	27.18; 17.49; 4.00
2013	9 Team PNoy	59.60	3 UNA	30.84		
2016	7 Koalisyon ng Daang Matuwid	43.81	4 Partido Galing at Puso	30.83	1 UNA	7.68
2019	9 Hugpong ng Pagbabago	56.23	0 Otso Diretso	13.82	1 NPC; 1 UNA; 1 independent	4.68; 4.13; 9.61
2022	1 Tuloy ang Pagbabago	9.84	1 TRoPa	12.44	4 UniTeam; 3 Lacson–Sotto slate 3 Independents	27.95; 19.12; 19.03
2025	6 Alyansa para sa Bagong Pilipinas	33.18	3 DuterTen	27.96	2 KiBam; 1 Nacionalista	8.48; 3.11

== By demographics ==
Election	Won reelection	Lost reelection	Retired or vacant	Term limited	Neophytes	Previously served	Total	Men	Women
1941	—	—	—	—	17	7	24	24	0
1946	4	1	11	—	11	1	16	16	0
1947	2	1	5	—	5	1	8	7	1
1949	2	4	2	—	6	0	8	8	0
1951	1	1	7	—	7	1	9	9	0
1953	2	5	3	—	3	2	8	8	0
1955	3	2	4	—	6	0	9	8	1
1957	3	3	2	—	5	0	8	8	0
1959	4	2	2	—	4	0	8	8	0
1961	2	5	1	—	4	1	8	7	1
1963	3	4	1	—	5	0	8	7	1
1965	3	1	4	—	5	0	8	7	1
1967	1	3	4	—	6	1	8	6	2
1969	5	3	0	—	2	1	8	8	0
1971	4	1	3	—	4	0	8	7	1
1987	—	—	—	—	19	5	24	22	2
1992	14	3	7	—	8	1	24	20	4
1995	4	2	2	4	7	1	12	9	3
1998	3	1	0	8	5	4	12	10	2
2001	4	3	4	2	7	1	13	12	1
2004	2	3	4	3	8	2	12	9	3
2007	5	1	3	3	5	2	12	11	1
2010	6	0	3	2	2	4	12	10	2
2013	6	0	1	5	6	0	12	8	4
2016	3	2	1	6	5	4	12	10	2
2019	5	2	1	4	4	3	12	7	5
2022	4	2	3	3	3	5	12	10	2
2025	5	2	1	4	3	4	12	9	3

== Top-notcher ==
Since the at-large era, a high-scoring winner can be seen as a strong contender for a future presidential or vice-presidential bid. Pacita Madrigal-Warns is the first woman to be a senatorial topnotcher. Jovito Salonga is the first senatorial candidate to take the top spot thrice; Loren Legarda comes in second by topping the polls twice.

Election	Topnotcher	Party	% votes	Future election to higher office result
1941	Claro M. Recto	Nacionalista	64.81	Lost 1957 presidential election
1946	Vicente Francisco	Nacionalista (Liberal wing)	28.63	Lost 1949 vice presidential election
1947	Lorenzo Tañada	Liberal	48.11	Lost 1957 vice presidential election
1949	Quintin Paredes	Liberal	49.08	
1951	Jose P. Laurel	Nacionalista	48.81	
1953	Fernando Lopez	Democratic	52.53	Won 1965 vice presidential election
1955	Pacita Madrigal-Warns	Nacionalista	50.43	
1957	Gil Puyat	Nacionalista	42.87	Lost 1961 vice presidential election
1959	Ferdinand Marcos Sr.	Liberal	41.62	Won 1965 presidential election Won 1969 presidential election Won 1981 presidential election Disputed victory at the 1986 presidential election was reportedly marred by graft and corruption
1961	Raul Manglapus	Progressive	51.78	Lost 1965 presidential election
1963	Gerardo Roxas	Liberal	46.98	Lost 1965 vice presidential election
1965	Jovito Salonga	Liberal	47.70	Lost 1992 presidential election
1967	Jose Roy	Nacionalista	51.73	
1969	Arturo Tolentino	Nacionalista	58.84	Victory at the 1986 vice presidential election disputed
1971	Jovito Salonga	Liberal	59.67	(see 1965)
1987	Jovito Salonga	LABAN	57.12	(see 1965)
1992	Tito Sotto	LDP	48.62	Lost 2022 Philippine vice presidential election
1995	Gloria Macapagal Arroyo	LDP	61.18	Won 1998 vice presidential election Won 2004 presidential election
1998	Loren Legarda	Lakas	50.99	Lost 2004 vice presidential election Lost 2010 vice presidential election
2001	Noli de Castro	Independent	55.09	Won 2004 vice presidential election
2004	Mar Roxas	Liberal	54.56	Lost 2010 vice presidential election Lost 2016 presidential election
2007	Loren Legarda	NPC	62.72	(see 1998)
2010	Bong Revilla	Lakas–Kampi	51.15	TBD
2013	Grace Poe	Independent	50.66	Lost 2016 presidential election
2016	Franklin Drilon	Liberal	41.37	
2019	Cynthia Villar	Nacionalista	53.46	TBD
2022	Robin Padilla	PDP–Laban	47.91	TBD
2025	Bong Go	PDP–Laban	47.29	TBD

== Senate composition ==
These are at the start of each Congress. A senator may change parties or leave office mid-term.

Election	1	2	3	4	5	6	7	8	9	10	11	12	13	14	15	16	17	18	19	20	21	22	23	24
1941																								
1946																								
1947																								
1949																								
1951																								
1953																								
1955																								
1957																								
1959																								
1961																								
1963																								
1965																								
1967																								
1969																								
1971																								
1987																								
1992																								
1995																								
1998																								
2001																								
2004																								
2007																								
2010																								
2013																								
2016																								
2019																								
2022																								
2025																								

== Latest elections ==
=== 2025 ===
Candidate	Party or alliance		Votes	%
Bong Go	DuterTen	PDP–Laban	27,121,073	47.29
Bam Aquino	KiBam	Katipunan ng Nagkakaisang Pilipino	20,971,899	36.57
Ronald dela Rosa	DuterTen	PDP–Laban	20,773,946	36.22
Erwin Tulfo	Alyansa para sa Bagong Pilipinas	Lakas–CMD	17,118,881	29.85
Kiko Pangilinan	KiBam	Liberal Party	15,343,229	26.75
Rodante Marcoleta	DuterTen	Independent	15,250,723	26.59
Panfilo Lacson	Alyansa para sa Bagong Pilipinas	Independent	15,106,111	26.34
Tito Sotto	Alyansa para sa Bagong Pilipinas	Nationalist People's Coalition	14,832,996	25.86
Pia Cayetano	Alyansa para sa Bagong Pilipinas	Nacionalista Party	14,573,430	25.41
Camille Villar	Alyansa para sa Bagong Pilipinas (Note: Guest candidate of DuterTen)	Nacionalista Party	13,651,274	23.80
Lito Lapid	Alyansa para sa Bagong Pilipinas	Nationalist People's Coalition	13,394,102	23.35
Imee Marcos	Nacionalista Party		13,339,227	23.26
Ben Tulfo	Independent		12,090,090	21.08
Bong Revilla	Alyansa para sa Bagong Pilipinas	Lakas–CMD	12,027,845	20.97
Abigail Binay	Alyansa para sa Bagong Pilipinas	Nationalist People's Coalition	11,808,645	20.59
Benhur Abalos	Alyansa para sa Bagong Pilipinas	Partido Federal ng Pilipinas	11,580,520	20.19
Jimmy Bondoc	DuterTen	PDP–Laban	10,615,598	18.51
Manny Pacquiao	Alyansa para sa Bagong Pilipinas	Partido Federal ng Pilipinas	10,397,133	18.13
Phillip Salvador	DuterTen	PDP–Laban	10,241,491	17.86
Bonifacio Bosita	Riding-in-Tandem Team	Independent	9,805,903	17.10
Heidi Mendoza	Independent		8,759,732	15.27
Willie Revillame	Independent		8,568,924	14.94
Vic Rodriguez	DuterTen	Independent	8,450,668	14.74
Raul Lambino	DuterTen	PDP–Laban	8,383,593	14.62
Francis Tolentino	Alyansa para sa Bagong Pilipinas	Partido Federal ng Pilipinas	7,702,550	13.43
Jayvee Hinlo	DuterTen	PDP–Laban	7,471,704	13.03
Willie Ong (Note: Withdrew but remained on the ballot)	Aksyon Demokratiko		7,371,944	12.85
Gregorio Honasan	Reform PH Party		6,700,772	11.68
Luke Espiritu	Partido Lakas ng Masa		6,481,413	11.30
Richard Mata	DuterTen	Independent	5,789,181	10.09
Apollo Quiboloy	DuterTen	Independent	5,719,041	9.97
Teodoro Casiño	Makabayan		4,648,271	8.10
Arlene Brosas	Makabayan		4,343,773	7.57
Leody de Guzman	Partido Lakas ng Masa		4,136,899	7.21
Danilo Ramos	Makabayan		4,091,257	7.13
Ariel Querubin	Riding-in-Tandem Team	Nacionalista Party	3,950,051	6.89
Liza Maza	Makabayan		3,927,784	6.85
Sonny Matula	Workers' and Peasants' Party		3,865,792	6.74
Ronnel Arambulo	Makabayan		3,846,216	6.71
France Castro	Makabayan		3,670,972	6.40
Angelo de Alban	Independent		2,556,983	4.46
Roberto Ballon	Independent		2,389,847	4.17
Norman Marquez	Independent		1,150,095	2.01
Eric Martinez	Independent		1,032,201	1.80
Norberto Gonzales	Partido Demokratiko Sosyalista ng Pilipinas		990,091	1.73
Jocelyn Andamo	Makabayan		829,084	1.45
Allen Capuyan	Partido Pilipino sa Pagbabago		818,437	1.43
Ernesto Arellano	Katipunan ng Kamalayang Kayumanggi		801,677	1.40
Jerome Adonis	Makabayan		779,868	1.36
Mimi Doringo	Makabayan		744,506	1.30
Arnel Escobal	Partido Maharlika		731,453	1.28
Jose Montemayor Jr.	Independent		671,818	1.17
Wilson Amad	Independent		618,943	1.08
Mar Valbuena	Independent		611,432	1.07
David D'Angelo	Bunyog Party		607,642	1.06
Wilbert T. Lee	Aksyon Demokratiko		587,098	1.02
Marc Gamboa	Aksyon Demokratiko	Independent	571,637	1.00
Amirah Lidasan	Makabayan		564,948	0.99
Mody Floranda	Makabayan		554,385	0.97
Nur-Ana Sahidulla	Independent		476,855	0.83
Michael Tapado	Partido Maharlika		460,662	0.80
Relly Jose Jr.	Kilusang Bagong Lipunan		458,383	0.80
Jose Olivar	Independent		448,794	0.78
Subair Mustapha	Workers' and Peasants' Party		414,027	0.72
Roy Cabonegro	Democratic Party of the Philippines		383,534	0.67
Leandro Verceles Jr.	Independent		310,562	0.54
Total			428,489,615	100.00
Total votes			57,350,958	–
Registered voters/turnout			69,673,655	82.31
Source: COMELEC

=== 2022 ===
Candidate	Party or alliance		Votes	%
Robin Padilla	Tuloy ang Pagbabago (Note: Guest candidate of the UniTeam)	PDP–Laban	26,612,434	47.91
Loren Legarda	Lacson–Sotto slate (Note: Guest candidate of the MP3 Alliance) (Note: Guest candidate of Tuloy ang Pagbabago)	Nationalist People's Coalition	24,264,969	43.68
Raffy Tulfo	Independent (Note: Guest candidate of the Lacson–Sotto slate)		23,396,954	42.12
Sherwin Gatchalian	UniTeam	Nationalist People's Coalition	20,602,655	37.09
Francis Escudero	Lacson–Sotto slate (Note: Guest candidate of Team Robredo–Pangilinan)	Nationalist People's Coalition	20,271,458	36.49
Mark Villar	UniTeam	Nacionalista Party	19,475,592	35.06
Alan Peter Cayetano	Independent		19,295,314	34.74
Juan Miguel Zubiri	UniTeam	Independent	18,734,336	33.73
Joel Villanueva	Independent		18,486,034	33.28
JV Ejercito	Lacson–Sotto slate (Note: Guest candidate of Aksyon Demokratiko)	Nationalist People's Coalition	15,841,858	28.52
Risa Hontiveros	Team Robredo–Pangilinan (Note: Guest candidate of Laban ng Masa)	Akbayan	15,420,807	27.76
Jinggoy Estrada	UniTeam	Pwersa ng Masang Pilipino	15,108,625	27.20
Jejomar Binay	United Nationalist Alliance		13,263,970	23.88
Herbert Bautista	UniTeam	Nationalist People's Coalition	13,104,710	23.59
Gilbert Teodoro	UniTeam	People's Reform Party	12,788,479	23.02
Guillermo Eleazar	Lacson–Sotto slate	Partido para sa Demokratikong Reporma	11,305,322	20.35
Harry Roque	UniTeam	People's Reform Party	11,246,206	20.25
Gregorio Honasan	Independent		10,643,491	19.16
Chel Diokno	Team Robredo–Pangilinan	Katipunan ng Nagkakaisang Pilipino	9,978,444	17.96
Larry Gadon	UniTeam	Kilusang Bagong Lipunan	9,691,607	17.45
Antonio Trillanes	Team Robredo–Pangilinan	Liberal Party	8,630,272	15.54
Dick Gordon	Bagumbayan–VNP		8,377,893	15.08
Leila de Lima	Team Robredo–Pangilinan	Liberal Party	7,278,602	13.10
Neri Colmenares	Makabayan		6,098,782	10.98
Alex Lacson	Team Robredo–Pangilinan	Ang Kapatiran	5,477,088	9.86
Salvador Panelo	Tuloy ang Pagbabago	PDP–Laban	4,887,066	8.80
Francis Leo Marcos	Independent		4,538,857	8.17
Teddy Baguilat	Team Robredo–Pangilinan	Liberal Party	4,275,873	7.70
Monsour del Rosario	Lacson–Sotto slate	Partido para sa Demokratikong Reporma	3,810,096	6.86
Carl Balita	Aksyon Demokratiko		3,730,164	6.71
Rodante Marcoleta (Note: Withdrew but remained on the ballot)	Tuloy ang Pagbabago	PDP–Laban	3,591,899	6.47
Emmanuel Piñol	Lacson–Sotto slate	Nationalist People's Coalition	3,544,283	6.38
Minguita Padilla	Lacson–Sotto slate	Partido para sa Demokratikong Reporma	3,541,038	6.37
Luke Espiritu	Laban ng Masa	Partido Lakas ng Masa	3,470,550	6.25
Astra Pimentel-Naik	Tuloy ang Pagbabago	PDP–Laban	2,975,908	5.36
Sonny Matula	Team Robredo–Pangilinan	Independent	2,692,565	4.85
Greco Belgica	Tuloy ang Pagbabago	Pederalismo ng Dugong Dakilang Samahan	2,349,040	4.23
Jopet Sison	Aksyon Demokratiko		2,218,095	3.99
Samira Gutoc	Aksyon Demokratiko		1,834,705	3.30
Carmen Zubiaga	Independent		1,763,898	3.18
Silvestre Bello Jr.	PDP–Laban		1,738,387	3.13
Elmer Labog	Makabayan		1,578,385	2.84
Rey Langit	Tuloy ang Pagbabago	PDP–Laban	1,364,548	2.46
Melchor Chavez	Labor Party Philippines		953,241	1.72
Abner Afuang	Independent		901,196	1.62
Roy Cabonegro	Laban ng Masa	Partido Lakas ng Masa	880,919	1.59
Ibrahim Albani	Labor Party Philippines		792,117	1.43
Lutgardo Barbo	MP3 Alliance	PDP–Laban	749,472	1.35
John Castriciones	Tuloy ang Pagbabago	PDP–Laban	712,852	1.28
David d'Angelo	Laban ng Masa	Partido Lakas ng Masa	693,932	1.25
Agnes Bailen	Independent		670,678	1.21
Nur-Mahal Kiram	Independent		585,337	1.05
Nur-Ana Sahidulla	Pederalismo ng Dugong Dakilang Samahan		572,645	1.03
Leo Olarte	Bigkis Pinoy Movement		567,649	1.02
Ariel Lim	Independent		560,660	1.01
Fernando Diaz	Partido Pilipino sa Pagbabago		557,522	1.00
Jesus Arranza	Independent		526,705	0.95
Willie Ricablanca Jr.	Partido Maharlika		490,712	0.88
RJ Javellana	Independent		471,999	0.85
Marieta Mindalano-Adam	Katipunan ng Kamalayang Kayumanggi		446,295	0.80
Ernie Ereño	Partido Maharlika		408,366	0.74
Baldomero Falcone	Democratic Party of the Philippines		396,527	0.71
Emily Mallillin	Partido Pederal ng Maharlika		390,134	0.70
Rey Valeros	Independent		353,730	0.64
Total			431,983,947	100.00
Total votes			55,549,791	–
Registered voters/turnout			66,839,976	83.11
Source: COMELEC

=== 2019 ===
Candidate	Party or alliance		Votes	%
Cynthia Villar	Hugpong ng Pagbabago	Nacionalista Party	25,283,727	53.46
Grace Poe	Independent		22,029,788	46.58
Bong Go	Hugpong ng Pagbabago	PDP–Laban	20,657,702	43.68
Pia Cayetano	Hugpong ng Pagbabago	Nacionalista Party	19,789,019	41.84
Ronald dela Rosa	Hugpong ng Pagbabago	PDP–Laban	19,004,225	40.18
Sonny Angara	Hugpong ng Pagbabago	Laban ng Demokratikong Pilipino	18,161,862	38.40
Lito Lapid	Nationalist People's Coalition		16,965,464	35.87
Imee Marcos	Hugpong ng Pagbabago	Nacionalista Party	15,882,628	33.58
Francis Tolentino	Hugpong ng Pagbabago	PDP–Laban	15,510,026	32.79
Koko Pimentel	Hugpong ng Pagbabago	PDP–Laban	14,668,665	31.01
Bong Revilla	Hugpong ng Pagbabago	Lakas–CMD	14,624,445	30.92
Nancy Binay	United Nationalist Alliance		14,504,936	30.67
JV Ejercito	Hugpong ng Pagbabago	Nationalist People's Coalition	14,313,727	30.26
Bam Aquino	Otso Diretso	Liberal Party	14,144,923	29.91
Jinggoy Estrada	Hugpong ng Pagbabago	Pwersa ng Masang Pilipino	11,359,305	24.02
Mar Roxas	Otso Diretso	Liberal Party	9,843,288	20.81
Serge Osmeña	Independent		9,455,202	19.99
Willie Ong	Lakas–CMD		7,616,265	16.10
Dong Mangudadatu	Hugpong ng Pagbabago	PDP–Laban	7,499,604	15.86
Jiggy Manicad	Hugpong ng Pagbabago	Independent	6,896,889	14.58
Chel Diokno	Otso Diretso	Liberal Party	6,342,939	13.41
Juan Ponce Enrile	Pwersa ng Masang Pilipino		5,319,298	11.25
Gary Alejano	Otso Diretso	Liberal Party	4,726,652	9.99
Neri Colmenares	Labor Win	Makabayan	4,683,942	9.90
Samira Gutoc	Otso Diretso	Liberal Party	4,345,252	9.19
Romulo Macalintal	Otso Diretso	Independent	4,007,339	8.47
Erin Tañada	Otso Diretso	Liberal Party	3,870,529	8.18
Larry Gadon	Katipunan ng Demokratikong Pilipino	Kilusang Bagong Lipunan	3,487,780	7.37
Florin Hilbay	Otso Diretso	Aksyon Demokratiko	2,757,879	5.83
Freddie Aguilar	Independent		2,580,230	5.46
Glenn Chong	Katipunan ng Demokratikong Pilipino		2,534,335	5.36
Rafael Alunan III	Bagumbayan–VNP		2,059,359	4.35
Faisal Mangondato	Katipunan ng Kamalayang Kayumanggi	Independent	1,988,719	4.20
Agnes Escudero	Katipunan ng Kamalayang Kayumanggi	Independent	1,545,985	3.27
Diosdado Padilla	Partido Federal ng Pilipinas		1,095,337	2.32
Ernesto Arellano	Labor Win	Independent	937,713	1.98
Allan Montaño	Labor Win	Independent	923,419	1.95
Leody de Guzman	Labor Win	Partido Lakas ng Masa	893,506	1.89
Melchor Chavez	Labor Party Philippines		764,473	1.62
Vanjie Abejo	Katipunan ng Kamalayang Kayumanggi	Independent	656,006	1.39
Edmundo Casiño	Katipunan ng Demokratikong Pilipino		580,853	1.23
Abner Afuang	Labor Party Philippines		559,001	1.18
Shariff Ibrahim Albani	Labor Party Philippines		496,855	1.05
Dan Roleda	United Nationalist Alliance		469,840	0.99
Conrado Generoso	Katipunan ng Kamalayang Kayumanggi	Independent	449,785	0.95
Nur-Ana Sahidulla	Katipunan ng Demokratikong Pilipino		444,096	0.94
Abraham Jangao	Independent		434,697	0.92
Marcelino Arias	Labor Party Philippines		404,513	0.86
Richard Alfajora	Katipunan ng Kamalayang Kayumanggi	Independent	404,513	0.86
Sonny Matula	Labor Party Philippines/Labor Win		400,339	0.85
Elmer Francisco	Partido Federal ng Pilipinas		395,427	0.84
Joan Sheelah Nalliw	Katipunan ng Kamalayang Kayumanggi	Independent	390,165	0.82
Gerald Arcega	Labor Party Philippines		383,749	0.81
Butch Valdes	Katipunan ng Demokratikong Pilipino		367,851	0.78
Jesus Caceres	Katipunan ng Kamalayang Kayumanggi	Independent	358,472	0.76
Bernard Austria	Partido Demokratiko Sosyalista ng Pilipinas		347,013	0.73
Jonathan Baldevarona	Independent		310,411	0.66
Emily Mallillin	Katipunan ng Kamalayang Kayumanggi	Independent	304,215	0.64
Charlie Gaddi	Katipunan ng Kamalayang Kayumanggi	Independent	286,361	0.61
RJ Javellana	Katipunan ng Demokratikong Pilipino		258,538	0.55
Junbert Guigayuma	Labor Party Philippines		240,306	0.51
Luther Meniano	Labor Party Philippines		159,774	0.34
Total			362,179,156	100.00
Total votes			47,296,442	–
Registered voters/turnout			63,643,263	74.31
Source: COMELEC

=== 2016 ===
Candidate	Party or alliance		Votes	%
Franklin Drilon	Koalisyon ng Daang Matuwid	Liberal Party	18,607,391	41.37
Joel Villanueva	Koalisyon ng Daang Matuwid (Note: Guest candidate of People's Reform Party)	Liberal Party	18,459,222	41.04
Tito Sotto	Partido Galing at Puso (Note: Guest candidate of United Nationalist Alliance)	Nationalist People's Coalition	17,200,371	38.24
Panfilo Lacson	Koalisyon ng Daang Matuwid	Independent	16,926,152	37.63
Dick Gordon	Partido Galing at Puso	Independent	16,719,322	37.17
Juan Miguel Zubiri	Partido Galing at Puso	Independent	16,119,165	35.84
Manny Pacquiao	United Nationalist Alliance		16,050,546	35.68
Kiko Pangilinan	Koalisyon ng Daang Matuwid	Liberal Party	15,955,949	35.47
Risa Hontiveros	Koalisyon ng Daang Matuwid	Akbayan	15,915,213	35.38
Sherwin Gatchalian	Partido Galing at Puso	Nationalist People's Coalition	14,953,768	33.25
Ralph Recto	Koalisyon ng Daang Matuwid (Note: Guest candidate of Partido Galing at Puso)	Liberal Party	14,271,868	31.73
Leila de Lima	Koalisyon ng Daang Matuwid	Liberal Party	14,144,070	31.45
Francis Tolentino	People's Reform Party	Independent	12,811,098	28.48
Serge Osmeña	Independent		12,670,615	28.17
Martin Romualdez	People's Reform Party	Lakas–CMD	12,325,824	27.40
Isko Moreno	Partido Galing at Puso	Pwersa ng Masang Pilipino	11,126,944	24.74
TG Guingona	Koalisyon ng Daang Matuwid	Liberal Party	10,331,157	22.97
Jericho Petilla	Koalisyon ng Daang Matuwid	Liberal Party	7,046,580	15.67
Mark Lapid	Koalisyon ng Daang Matuwid	Aksyon Demokratiko	6,594,190	14.66
Neri Colmenares	Partido Galing at Puso	Makabayan	6,484,985	14.42
Edu Manzano	Partido Galing at Puso	Independent	5,269,539	11.72
Roman Romulo	Partido Galing at Puso	Independent	4,824,484	10.73
Susan Ople	Partido Galing at Puso	Nacionalista Party	2,775,191	6.17
Alma Moreno	United Nationalist Alliance		2,432,224	5.41
Greco Belgica	Independent		2,100,985	4.67
Rafael Alunan III	Independent		2,032,362	4.52
Larry Gadon	Kilusang Bagong Lipunan		1,971,327	4.38
Rey Langit	United Nationalist Alliance		1,857,630	4.13
Lorna Kapunan	Partido Galing at Puso	Aksyon Demokratiko	1,838,978	4.09
Dionisio Santiago	People's Reform Party	Independent	1,828,305	4.06
Samuel Pagdilao	Partido Galing at Puso	Independent	1,755,949	3.90
Melchor Chavez	Partido ng Manggagawa at Magsasaka		1,736,822	3.86
Getulio Napeñas	United Nationalist Alliance		1,719,576	3.82
Ina Ambolodto	Koalisyon ng Daang Matuwid	Liberal Party	1,696,558	3.77
Allan Montaño	United Nationalist Alliance		1,605,073	3.57
Walden Bello	Independent		1,091,194	2.43
Jacel Kiram	United Nationalist Alliance		995,673	2.21
Shariff Ibrahim Albani	Independent		905,610	2.01
Jovito Palparan	Independent		855,297	1.90
Cresente Paez	Koalisyon ng Daang Matuwid	Independent	808,623	1.80
Sandra Cam	Pwersa ng Masang Pilipino		805,756	1.79
Dante Liban	Independent		782,249	1.74
Ramon Montaño	Independent		759,263	1.69
Aldin Ali	Partido ng Manggagawa at Magsasaka		733,838	1.63
Romeo Maganto	Lakas–CMD		731,021	1.63
Godofredo Arquiza	Independent		680,550	1.51
Levito Baligod	Independent		596,583	1.33
Diosdado Valeroso	Independent		527,146	1.17
Ray Dorona	Independent		495,191	1.10
Eid Kabalu	Independent		379,846	0.84
Total			321,307,273	100.00
Total votes			44,979,151	–
Registered voters/turnout			55,739,911	80.69
Source: COMELEC

=== 2013 ===
Candidate	Party or alliance		Votes	%
Grace Poe	Team PNoy (Note: Guest candidate of Makabayan)	Independent	20,337,327	50.66
Loren Legarda	Team PNoy	Nationalist People's Coalition	18,661,196	46.49
Alan Peter Cayetano	Team PNoy	Nacionalista Party	17,580,813	43.79
Francis Escudero	Team PNoy	Independent	17,502,358	43.60
Nancy Binay	United Nationalist Alliance		16,812,148	41.88
Sonny Angara	Team PNoy	Laban ng Demokratikong Pilipino	16,005,564	39.87
Bam Aquino	Team PNoy	Liberal Party	15,534,465	38.70
Koko Pimentel	Team PNoy	PDP–Laban	14,725,114	36.68
Antonio Trillanes	Team PNoy	Nacionalista Party	14,127,722	35.19
Cynthia Villar	Team PNoy	Nacionalista Party	13,822,854	34.43
JV Ejercito	United Nationalist Alliance		13,684,736	34.09
Gregorio Honasan	United Nationalist Alliance		13,211,424	32.91
Dick Gordon	United Nationalist Alliance		12,501,991	31.14
Juan Miguel Zubiri	United Nationalist Alliance		11,821,134	29.45
Jack Enrile	United Nationalist Alliance	Nationalist People's Coalition	11,543,024	28.75
Ramon Magsaysay Jr.	Team PNoy	Liberal Party	11,356,739	28.29
Risa Hontiveros	Team PNoy	Akbayan	10,944,843	27.26
Edward Hagedorn	Independent		8,412,840	20.96
Eddie Villanueva	Bangon Pilipinas		6,932,985	17.27
Jamby Madrigal	Team PNoy	Liberal Party	6,787,744	16.91
Mitos Magsaysay	United Nationalist Alliance		5,620,429	14.00
Teodoro Casiño	Makabayan		4,295,151	10.70
Ernesto Maceda	United Nationalist Alliance		3,453,121	8.60
Tingting Cojuangco	United Nationalist Alliance		3,152,939	7.85
Samson Alcantara	Social Justice Society		1,240,104	3.09
John Carlos de los Reyes	Ang Kapatiran		1,238,280	3.08
Greco Belgica	Democratic Party of the Philippines		1,128,924	2.81
Ricardo Penson	Independent		1,040,293	2.59
Ramon Montaño	Independent		1,040,131	2.59
Rizalito David	Ang Kapatiran		1,035,971	2.58
Christian Señeres	Democratic Party of the Philippines		706,198	1.76
Marwil Llasos	Ang Kapatiran		701,390	1.75
Baldomero Falcone	Democratic Party of the Philippines		665,845	1.66
Total			297,625,797	100.00
Total votes			40,144,207	–
Registered voters/turnout			52,982,173	75.77
Source: COMELEC
