= 1961 Philippine Senate election =

17th Philippine senatorial election

- November 14, 1961

8 (of the 24) seats in the Senate 13 seats needed for a majority
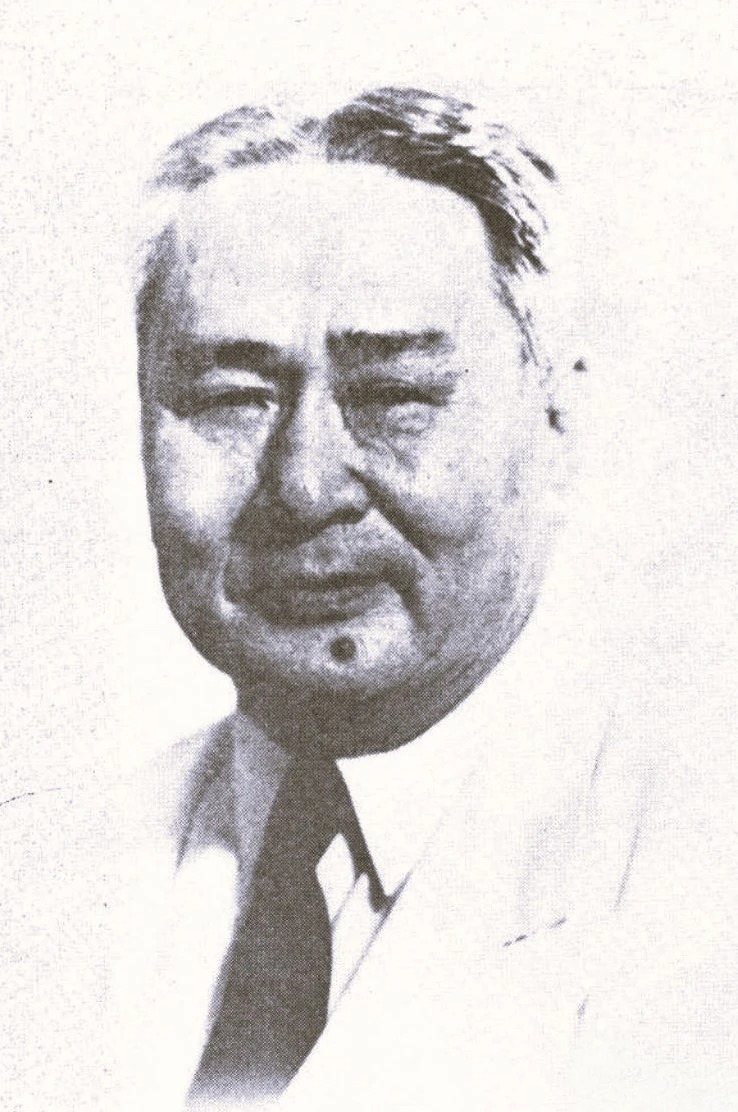

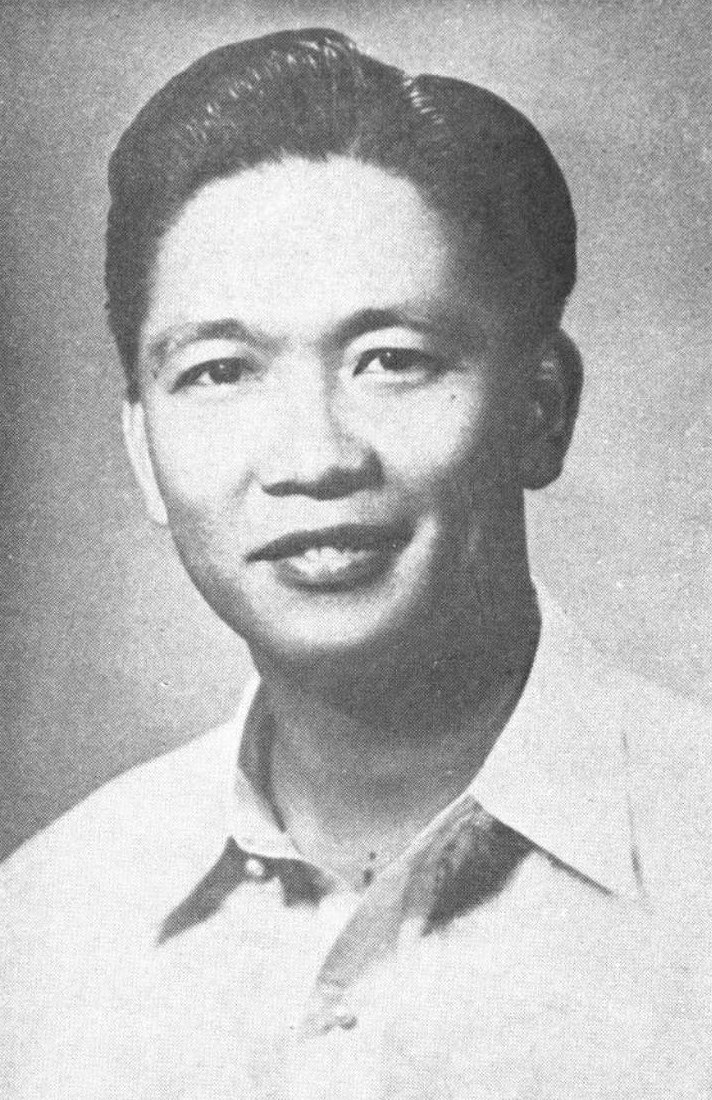

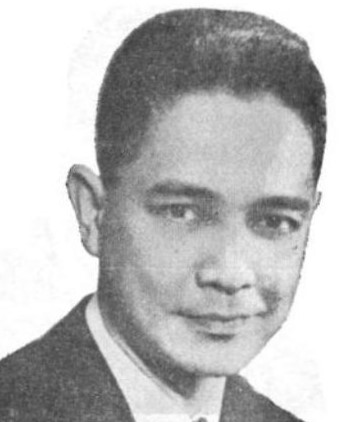
	Majority party	Minority party	Third party
Leader	Eulogio Rodriguez	Ferdinand Marcos	Raul Manglapus
Party	Nacionalista	Liberal	Progressive
Seats before	17 (6 up)	5 (1 up)	0
Seats won	2	4	2
Seats after	13	8	2
Seat change	▼4	▲3	▲2
Popular vote	17,834,477	14,988,931	6,577,698
Percentage	45.07	37.88	16.62
Swing	▲0.03	▲9.58	▼3.99
Senate President before election
Eulogio Rodriguez
Nacionalista
Elected Senate President
Eulogio Rodriguez
Nacionalista

The 17th election of members to the Senate of the Philippines was held on November 14, 1961. The two candidates of the Progressive Party, guest candidates of the Liberal Party, topped the election, while the Liberals themselves won four seats cutting the Nacionalista Party's majority to 13 seats in the 24-seat Philippine Senate.

== Electoral system ==
Philippine Senate elections are held via plurality block voting with staggered elections, with the country as an at-large district. The Senate has 24 seats, of which 8 seats are up every 2 years. The eight seats up were last contested in 1955; each voter has eight votes and can vote up to eight names, of which the eight candidates with the most votes winning the election.

== Retiring incumbents ==
All incumbents defended their seats in this election.

=== Mid-term vacancies ===
1. Claro M. Recto (Nacionalista), died on October 2, 1960

=== Incumbents running elsewhere ===
These ran in the middle of their Senate terms. For those losing in their respective elections, they can still return to the Senate to serve out their term, while the winners will vacate their Senate seats, then it would have been contested in a special election concurrently with the next general election.

1. Gil Puyat (Nacionalista), ran for vice president and lost

== Results ==
The Liberal Party won four seats contested in the election, while the Nacionalista Party and the Progressive Party won two each.

Lorenzo Sumulong was the sole Nacionalista to successfully defend his seat. Liberal Francisco Soc Rodrigo, who originally was a Nacionalista, was the other senator to defend his seat.

Two Liberals are neophyte senators: Gaudencio Antonino and Maria Kalaw Katigbak. Also entering the Senate for the first time are Progressives Manuel Manahan and Raul Manglapus. Camilo Osias, who last served in the Senate in 1953, won back a Senate seat as a Liberal.

Incumbent Nacionalista senators Decoroso Rosales, Domocao Alonto, Pacita Madrigal-Warns, Pedro Sabido, and Quintin Paredes all lost.

	1	2	3	4	5	6	7	8	9	10	11	12	13	14	15	16	17	18	19	20	21	22	23	24
Before election					‡	‡^	‡	‡	‡	‡	‡	‡												
Election result	Not up				LP				PPP		NP		Not up											
After election					√	+	+	+	+	+	*	√												

Key:

- ‡ Seats up
- + Gained by a party from another party
- √ Held by the incumbent
- * Held by the same party with a new senator
- ^ Vacancy

=== Per candidate ===
Candidate	Party	Votes	%
Raul Manglapus	Party for Philippine Progress (Note: Guest candidate of the Liberal Party)	3,489,658	51.78
Manuel Manahan	Party for Philippine Progress	3,088,040	45.82
Lorenzo Sumulong	Nacionalista Party	2,817,228	41.81
Soc Rodrigo	Liberal Party	2,710,322	40.22
Gaudencio Antonino	Liberal Party	2,636,420	39.12
Camilo Osías	Liberal Party	2,634,783	39.10
Maria Kalaw Katigbak	Liberal Party	2,546,147	37.78
Jose Roy	Nacionalista Party	2,443,110	36.25
Tecla San Andres Ziga	Liberal Party	2,318,518	34.41
Quintin Paredes	Nacionalista Party	2,206,064	32.74
Pacita Madrigal-Gonzales	Nacionalista Party	2,172,260	32.24
Cesar Climaco	Liberal Party	2,142,741	31.80
Domocao Alonto	Nacionalista Party	1,877,698	27.86
Decoroso Rosales	Nacionalista Party	1,863,560	27.65
Pedro Sabido	Nacionalista Party	1,746,698	25.92
Angel Castaño	Nacionalista Party	1,734,247	25.74
Jose E. Romero	Nacionalista Party	973,612	14.45
Agustin Marking	Independent	127,820	1.90
Francisco Ofemaria	Independent	41,084	0.61
Ernesto Hidalgo	Independent	1,878	0.03
Leon Javinez Sr.	Independent	339	0.01
Jose Briones	Independent	141	0.00
Total		39,572,368	100.00
Total votes		6,738,805	–
Registered voters/turnout		8,483,568	79.43

=== Per party ===
Party	Votes	%	+/–	Seats				
Party	Votes	%	+/–	Up	Before	Won	After	+/−
Nacionalista Party	17,834,477	45.07	+0.03	6	17	2	13	−4
Liberal Party	14,988,931	37.88	+9.58	1	5	4	8	+3
Party for Philippine Progress	6,577,698	16.62	−3.99	0	0	2	2	New
Independent	171,262	0.43	+0.39	0	0	0	0	0
Nationalist Citizens' Party				0	1	0	1	0
Vacancy				1	1	0	0	−1
Total	39,572,368	100.00	–	8	24	8	24	0
Total votes	6,738,805	–						
Registered voters/turnout	8,483,568	79.43						

Vote share
NP	45.07%
LP	37.88%
PPP	16.62%
Others	0.43%

Senate seats
NP	25.00%
LP	50.00%
PPP	25.00%
Others	0.00%

== Defeated incumbents ==
1. Domocao Alonto (Nacionalista) ran as delegate to the Constitutional Convention in 1970 and won
2. Pacita Madrigal-Warns (Nacionalista) retired from politics
3. Pedro Sabido (Nacionalista) retired from politics
4. Quintin Paredes (Nacionalista) retired from politics
5. Decoroso Rosales (Nacionalista) ran as delegate to the Constitutional Convention in 1970 and won

== See also ==
- Commission on Elections
- 5th Congress of the Philippines
