= 1953 Philippine Senate election =

13th Philippine senatorial election

- November 10, 1953

8 (of the 24) seats in the Senate 13 seats needed for a majority
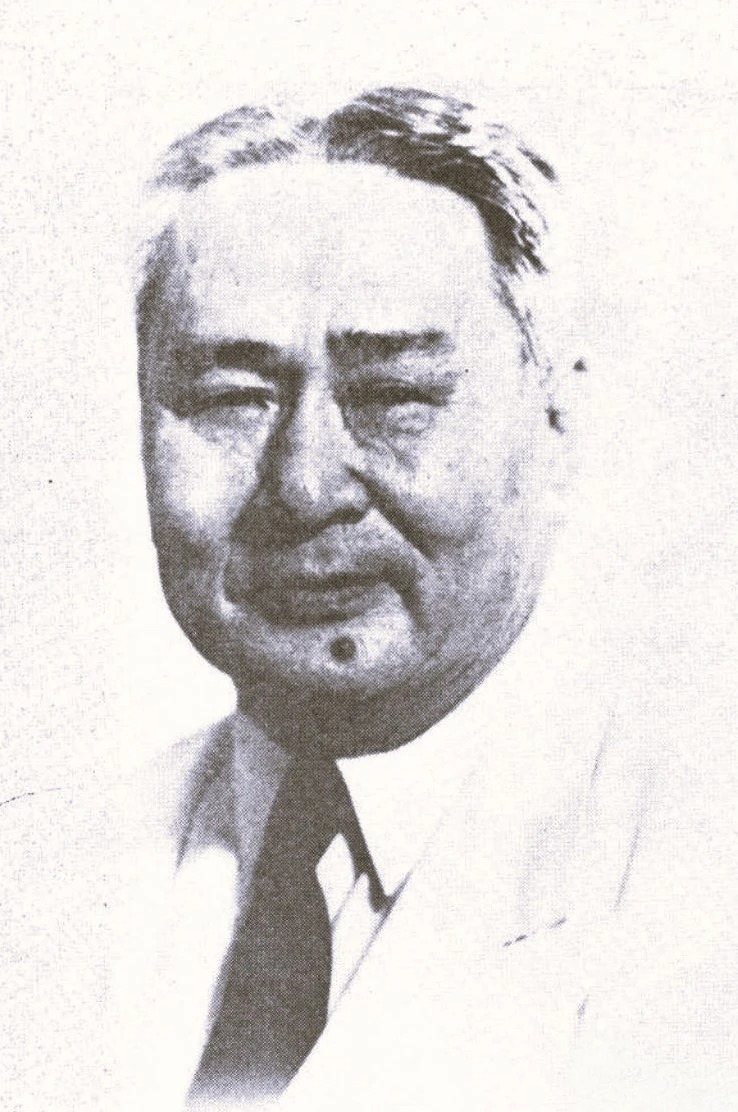

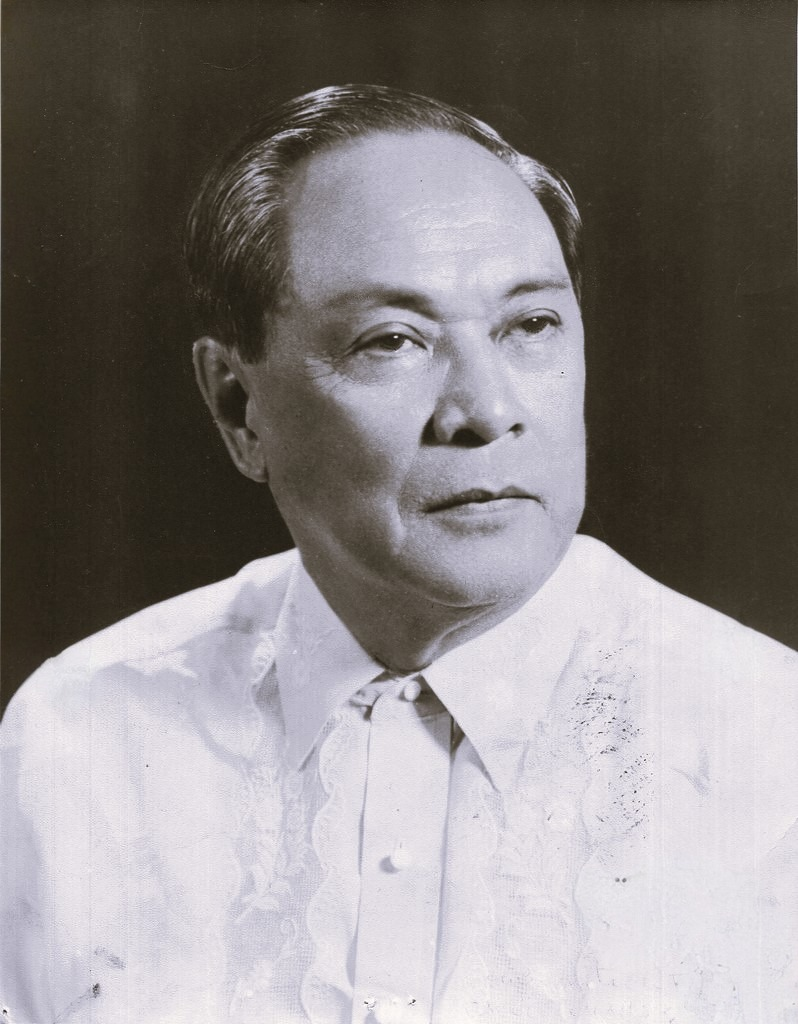

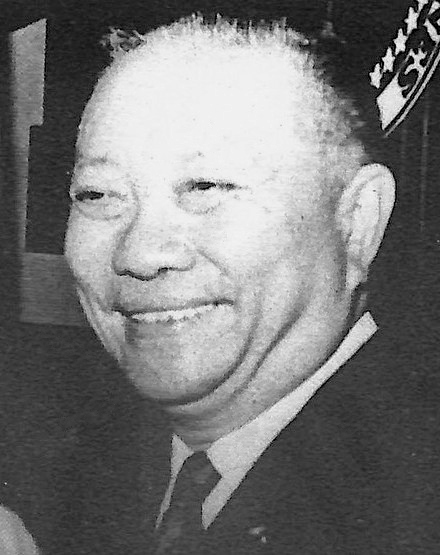

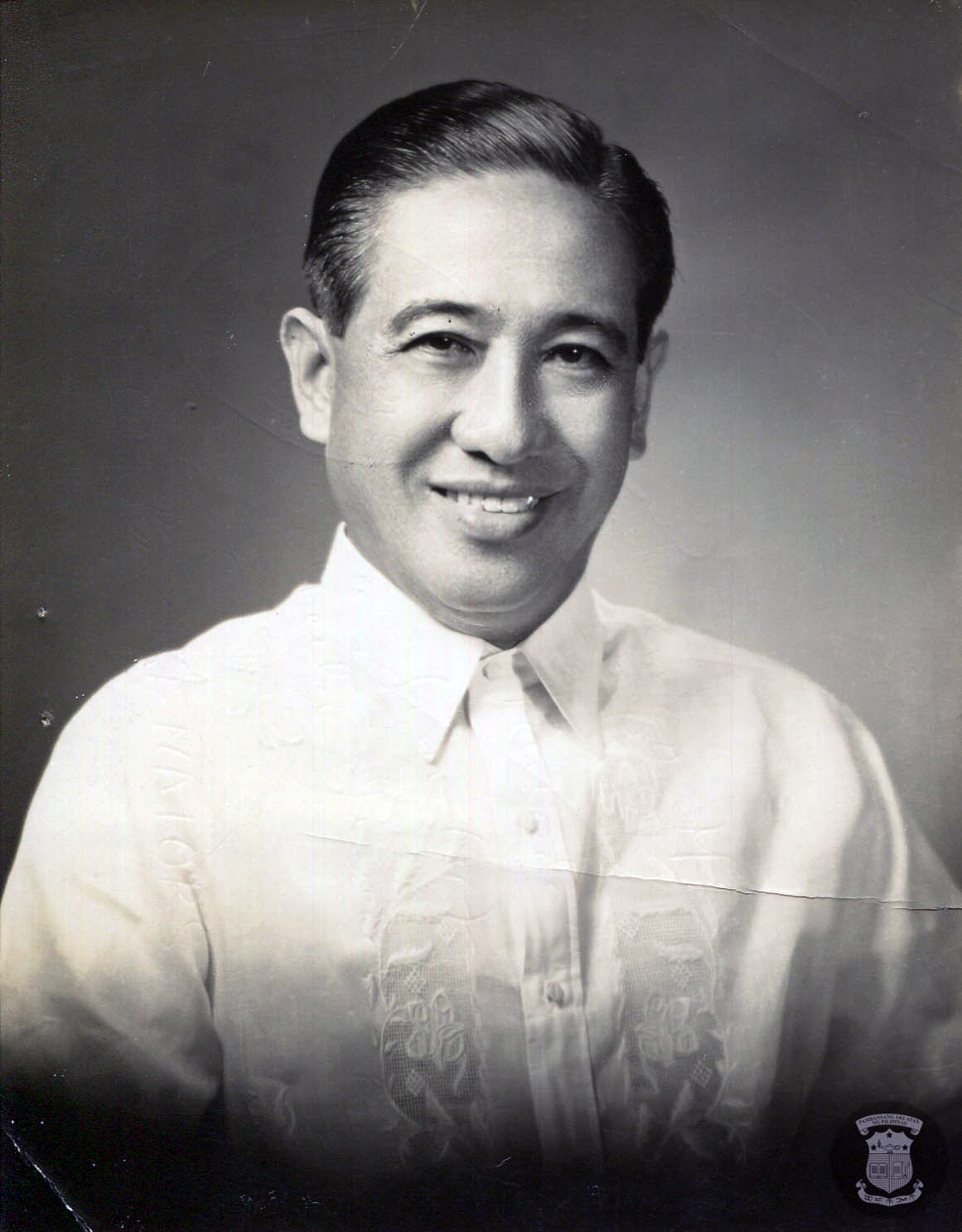
	First party	Second party
Leader	Eulogio Rodriguez	Quintin Paredes
Party	Nacionalista	Liberal
Seats before	11 (3 up)	11 (3 up)
Seats won	5	0
Seats after	13	7
Seat change	▲2	▼4
Popular vote	9,813,166	8,861,244
Percentage	39.83	35.97
Swing	▼18.37	▼2.22
	Third party	Fourth party
Leader	Fernando Lopez	Lorenzo Tañada
Party	Democratic	Citizens
Seats before	0	1 (1 up)
Seats won	2	1
Seats after	2	1
Seat change	▲2	Steady
Popular vote	3,793,654	2,156,717
Percentage	15.40	8.75
Swing	▲15.40	▲8.75
Senate President before election
Jose Zulueta
Nacionalista
Elected Senate President
Eulogio Rodriguez
Nacionalista

The 13th election of members to the Senate of the Philippines was held on November 10, 1953. Incumbent President Elpidio Quirino of the Liberal Party lost his opportunity to get a second full term as President of the Philippines to former Defense Secretary Ramon Magsaysay of the Nacionalista Party. Quirino's running mate, Senator Jose Yulo lost to Senator Carlos P. Garcia. Vice President Fernando Lopez did not run for re-election and ran for the Senate instead, in which he emerged as the candidate with the most votes. This was the first time that an elected president did not come from the Senate. To further compound the Liberal Party's woes, they also failed to win any seats in the Senate in this election.

The Citizens' Party and the Democratic Party caucused with the Nacionalistas to provide them the majority in the Senate.

== Electoral system ==
Philippine Senate elections are held via plurality block voting with staggered elections, with the country as an at-large district. The Senate has 24 seats, of which 8 seats are up every 2 years. The eight seats up were last contested in 1947; each voter has eight votes and can vote up to eight names, of which the eight candidates with the most votes winning the election.

== Retiring incumbents ==
All senators whose seats were up contested the election.

=== Mid-term vacancy ===
1. Emiliano Tria Tirona (Liberal), died on April 8, 1952

=== Other changes ===
1. Claro M. Recto (Nacionalista) won an electoral protest against Senator Teodoro de Vera (Liberal) in the Senate Electoral Tribunal. Recto was seated on April 3, 1953.

=== Incumbents running elsewhere ===
These ran in the middle of their Senate terms. For those losing in their respective elections, they can still return to the Senate to serve out their term, while the winners will vacate their Senate seats, then it would have been contested in a special election concurrently with the next general election.

1. Carlos P. Garcia (Nacionalista), ran for vice president and won

== Results ==
The Nacionalista Party won five seats contested in the election, with the Democratic Party winning two, and the Citizens' Party winning one.

Nacionalista Eulogio Rodriguez and Lorenzo Tañada of the Citizens' Party both defended their Senate seats. The four Liberal senators whose seats were up in this election were defeated: Camilo Osias, Geronima Pecson, Pablo Ángeles David and Vicente Madrigal. Felixberto Verano, who won a special election in 1951, was the sole Nacionalista defeat.

Three winners are neophyte Nacionalista senators: Alejo Mabanag, Edmundo B. Cea and Emmanuel Pelaez.

Incumbent vice president and Democrat Fernando Lopez returned to the Senate after serving from 1947 to 1949. Mariano Jesús Cuenco, who was defeated in the last election, made a comeback in the Senate, this time under the banner of the Nacionalistas.

Senator Carlos P. Garcia of the Nacionalistas was elected vice president in concurrent elections; his seat will be vacant until 1955 when it would have been contested in a special election.

	1	2	3	4	5	6	7	8	9	10	11	12	13	14	15	16	17	18	19	20	21	22	23	24
Before election								‡	‡	‡	‡	‡^	‡	‡	‡									
Election result	Not up							CP	DP		NP					Not up								
After election								√	+	+	+	+	+	*	√									^

Key:

- ‡ Seats up
- + Gained by a party from another party
- √ Held by the incumbent
- * Held by the same party with a new senator
- ^ Vacancy

=== Per candidate ===
Candidate	Party	Votes	%
Fernando Lopez	Democratic Party	2,272,642	52.53
Lorenzo Tañada	Citizens' Party	2,156,717	49.85
Eulogio Rodriguez	Nacionalista Party	2,071,844	47.89
Emmanuel Pelaez	Nacionalista Party	2,010,128	46.46
Edmundo B. Cea	Nacionalista Party	1,961,705	45.34
Mariano Jesús Cuenco	Nacionalista Party	1,853,247	42.83
Alejo Mabanag	Nacionalista Party	1,846,190	42.67
Ruperto Kangleon	Democratic Party	1,521,012	35.15
Geronima Pecson	Liberal Party	1,349,163	31.18
Camilo Osías	Liberal Party	1,324,567	30.61
Jose Figueroa	Liberal Party	1,194,952	27.62
Vicente Madrigal	Liberal Party	1,155,577	26.71
José Avelino	Liberal Party	1,012,599	23.40
Jacinto O. Borja	Liberal Party	968,841	22.39
Salipada Pendatun	Liberal Party	945,755	21.86
Pablo Ángeles David	Liberal Party	909,790	21.03
Felixberto Verano	Nacionalista Party	59,782	1.38
Jose Maria Veloso	Nacionalista Party	10,270	0.24
Alfredo Abcede	Federal Party	5,365	0.12
Concepcion R. Lim de Planas	Independent	4,439	0.10
Total		24,634,585	100.00
Total votes		4,326,706	–
Registered voters/turnout		5,603,231	77.22

=== Per party ===
The seat vacated by the death of Emiliano Tria Tirona in 1952 was disputed in this election.

The Nacionalistas originally had 14 seats entering the 3rd Congress, but the election of Senator Carlos P. Garcia to the vice presidency meant that his seat is vacant until 1955, when it was contested in a special election two years later.

Party	Votes	%	+/–	Seats				
Party	Votes	%	+/–	Up	Before	Won	After	+/−
Nacionalista Party	9,813,166	39.83	−18.37	3	11	5	13	+2
Liberal Party	8,861,244	35.97	−2.22	3	11	0	7	−4
Democratic Party	3,793,654	15.40	New	0	0	2	2	New
Citizens' Party	2,156,717	8.75	New	1	1	1	1	0
Federal Party	5,365	0.02	New	0	0	0	0	0
Independent	4,439	0.02	−0.38	0	0	0	0	0
Vacancy				1	1	0	0	−1
Total	24,634,585	100.00	–	8	24	8	24	0
Total votes	4,326,706	–						
Registered voters/turnout	5,603,231	77.22						

Vote share
NP	39.83%
LP	35.97%
DP	15.40%
CP	8.75%
Others	0.04%

Senate seats
NP	62.50%
LP	0.00%
DP	25.00%
CP	12.50%
Others	0.00%

== Defeated incumbents ==
1. Pablo Ángeles David (Liberal), retired from politics
2. Vicente Madrigal (Liberal), retired from politics
3. Camilo Osias (Liberal), ran in 1955 and lost, ran in 1961 and won
4. Geronima Pecson (Liberal), ran in 1955 and lost
5. Felisberto Verano (Nacionalista), retired from politics

== See also ==
- Commission on Elections
- 3rd Congress of the Philippines
