= 1955 Philippine Senate election =

14th Philippine senatorial election

1955 Philippine general election
- November 8, 1955

8 (of the 24) seats in the Senate and 1 mid-term vacancy 13 seats needed for a majority
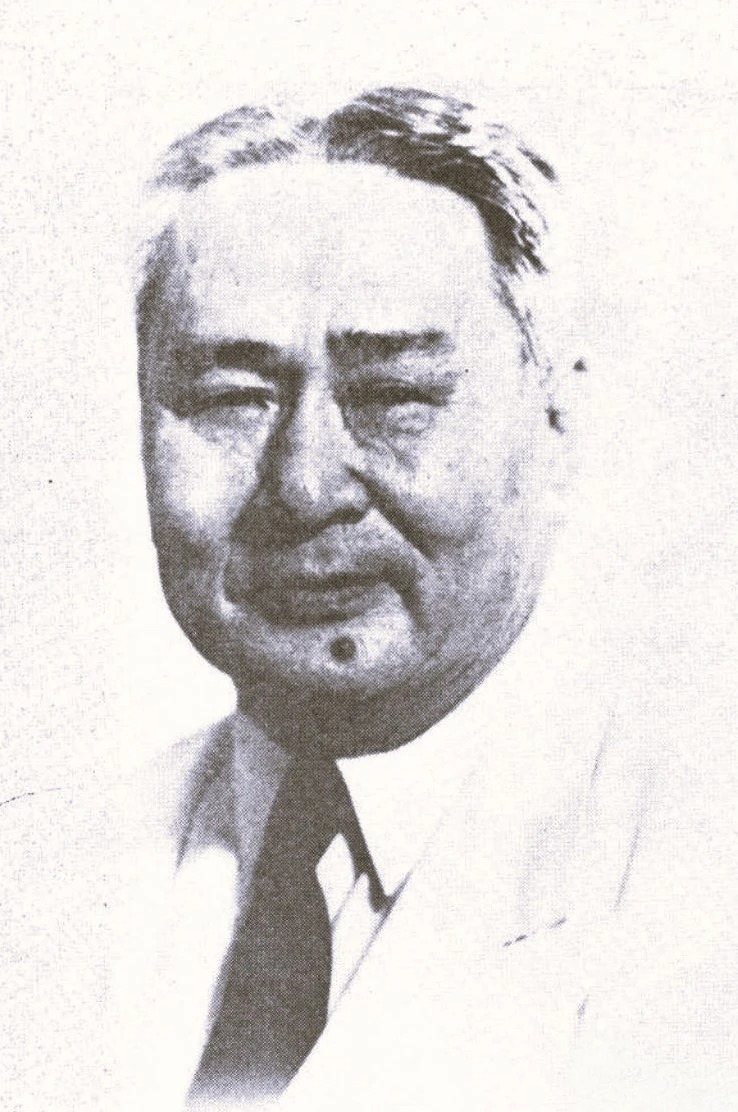

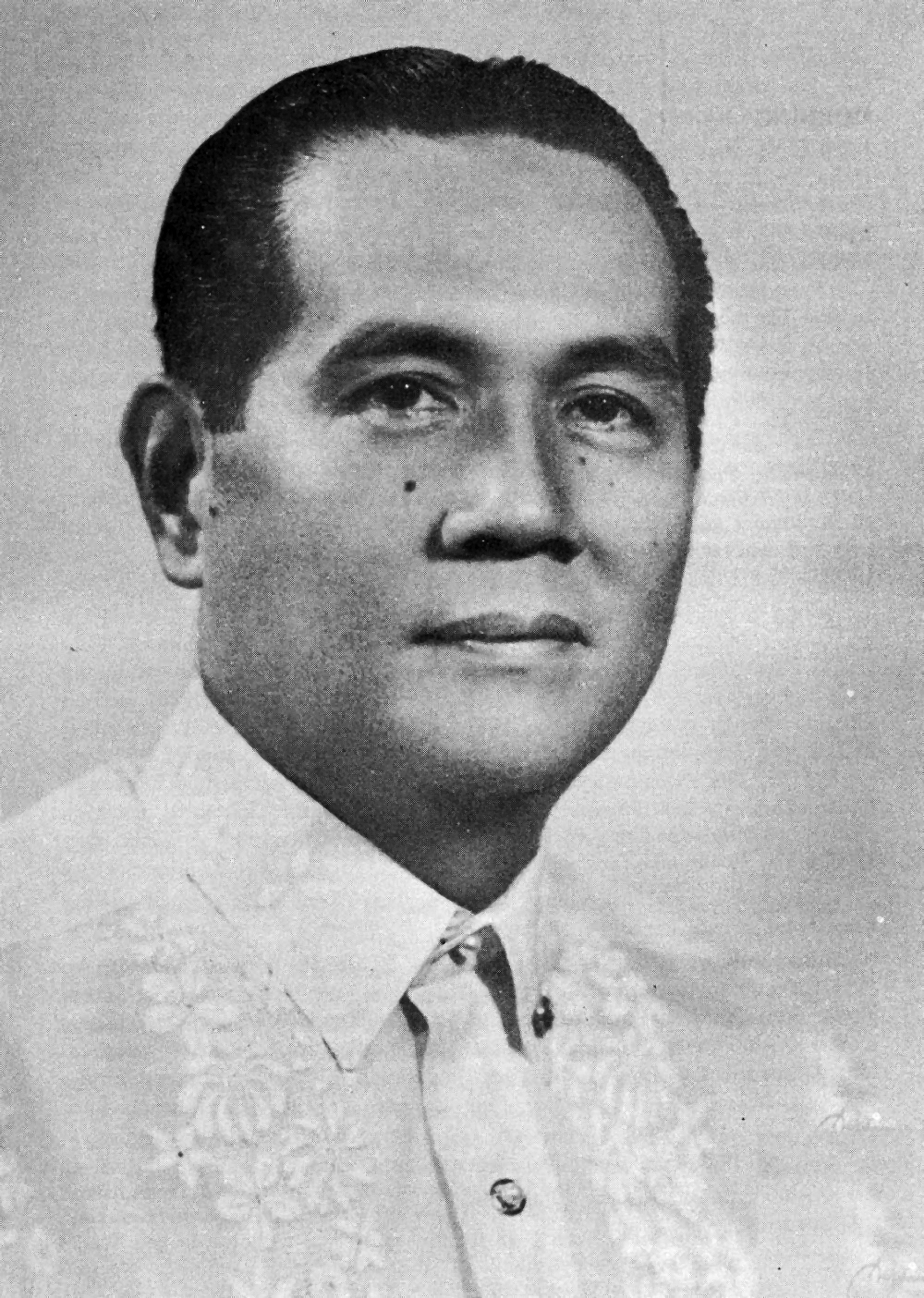
	Majority party	Minority party
Leader	Eulogio Rodriguez	Diosdado Macapagal (lost)
Party	Nacionalista	Liberal
Seats before	17 (3 up)	4 (4 up)
Seats won	9	0
Seats after	23	0
Seat change	▲6	▼4
Popular vote	18,422,368	8,968,978
Percentage	67.18	32.71
Swing	▲27.35	▼3.26
Senate President before election
Eulogio Rodriguez
Nacionalista
Elected Senate President
Eulogio Rodriguez
Nacionalista

The 14th election of members to the Senate of the Philippines was held on November 8, 1955. This was a midterm election, the date when the winners took office falling halfway through President Ramon Magsaysay's four-year term.

== Electoral system ==
Philippine Senate elections are held via plurality block voting with staggered elections, with the country as an at-large district. The Senate has 24 seats, of which 8 seats are up every 2 years. The eight seats up were last contested in 1949; each voter has eight votes and can vote up to eight names, of which the eight candidates with the most votes winning the election.

There was a separate special election held for the vacant seat of Senator Carlos P. Garcia after he won as Vice President in 1953. This is under first-past-the-post. The winner shall then serve for the remainder of Garcia's Senate term.

== Summary ==
Since Magsaysay was very popular midway through his term, there were 10 candidates who ran under the Nacionalista banner. His adoptive Nacionalista Party continued to grow in strength with the absorption of their erstwhile coalition partner, the Democratic Party; but a pillar of the NP could not hide his opposition to the president. Senator Claro M. Recto, one of those who actively sought the adoption of the former Defense Secretary into the NP fold in 1953, had grown critical of Magsaysay, calling him a “banana dictator” and “American puppet,” among other unflattering names. In retaliation, Magsaysay refused the inclusion of Recto into the NP Senate slate of 1955, prompting the Batangueño leader to seek support for his candidacy with the Liberals.

Though Lorenzo Tañada of the NCP had cooperated with the NP in 1953, Recto became the first “guest candidate” in Philippine electoral history, when he was included in the Liberal Party lineup but did not resign his membership as a Nacionalista.

== Retiring incumbents ==
1. Tomas Cabili (Liberal)
2. Justiniano Montano (Liberal), ran for House representative from Cavite's at-large district in 1957 and won

=== Mid-term vacancies ===
1. Esteban Abada (Liberal), died on December 17, 1954
2. Carlos P. Garcia (Nacionalista), elected vice president, left office on December 30, 1953

== Results ==
The Nacionalista Party won all eight seats contested in the general election, and won the one seat contested in the special election.

Nacionalistas Quintin Paredes, Claro M. Recto, Lorenzo Sumulong both defended their Senate seats. Paredes and Sumulong were former Liberals who ran as Nacionalistas in this election. The two Liberal senators who defended their seats were defeated: Enrique Magalona and Macario Peralta Jr.

Five winners are neophyte Nacionalista senators: Decoroso Rosales, Domocao Alonto, Francisco "Soc" Rodrigo, Pacita Madrigal-Warns, and Pedro Sabido. Madrigal-Warns became the only woman in the Senate.

	1	2	3	4	5	6	7	8	9	10	11	12	13	14	15	16	17	18	19	20	21	22	23	24
Before election		‡	‡	‡	‡	‡^	‡^	‡	‡	‡														
Election result	Not up	NP									Not up													
After election		+	+	+	+	+	+	√	√	√														

Key:

- ‡ Seats up
- + Gained by a party from another party
- √ Held by the incumbent
- * Held by the same party with a new senator
- ^ Vacancy

=== Per candidate (general election) ===
Candidate	Party	Votes	%
Pacita Madrigal-Warns	Nacionalista Party	2,544,716	50.43
Lorenzo Sumulong	Nacionalista Party	2,250,780	44.60
Quintin Paredes	Nacionalista Party	2,171,415	43.03
Soc Rodrigo	Nacionalista Party	2,132,094	42.25
Pedro Sabido	Nacionalista Party	1,821,098	36.09
Claro M. Recto	Nacionalista Party (Note: Guest candidate of the Liberal Party)	1,716,984	34.02
Domocao Alonto	Nacionalista Party	1,619,109	32.08
Decoroso Rosales	Nacionalista Party	1,600,255	31.71
Diosdado Macapagal	Liberal Party	1,454,200	28.82
Juan Chioco	Nacionalista Party	1,452,693	28.79
Camilo Osías	Liberal Party	1,388,137	27.51
Geronima Pecson	Liberal Party	1,340,800	26.57
Macario Peralta Jr.	Liberal Party	1,207,495	23.93
Enrique Magalona	Liberal Party	1,086,054	21.52
Pio Pedrosa	Liberal Party	919,302	18.22
William Chiongbian	Liberal Party	884,077	17.52
Alfredo Abcede	Federal Party	22,769	0.45
Concepcion R. Lim de Planas	Nacionalista Party	10,245	0.20
Vicente A. Rafael	Independent	4,551	0.09
Filemon Blay	Independent	1,179	0.02
Praxedes Floro	Independent	1,081	0.02
Total		25,629,034	100.00
Total votes		5,046,488	–
Registered voters/turnout		6,487,061	77.79

=== Special election ===
One seat was up for election to fill its vacancy created by Carlos P. Garcia's election as vice president in 1953. Unlike the regular election, this is held under the first past the post system.

Candidate	Party	Votes	%
Roseller T. Lim	Nacionalista Party	1,102,979	61.40
Simeon Toribio	Liberal Party	688,913	38.35
Avelino P. Garcia	Independent	4,378	0.24
Total		1,796,270	100.00
Valid votes		1,796,270	35.59
Invalid/blank votes		3,250,218	64.41
Total votes		5,046,488	–
Registered voters/turnout		6,487,061	77.79

=== Per party ===
This includes the result of the special election.

Party	Votes	%	+/–	Seats				
Party	Votes	%	+/–	Up	Before	Won	After	+/−
Nacionalista Party	18,422,368	67.18	+27.35	3	17	9	23	+6
Liberal Party	8,968,978	32.71	−3.26	4	4	0	0	−4
Federal Party	22,769	0.08	+0.06	0	0	0	0	0
Independent	6,811	0.02	+0.01	0	0	0	0	0
Citizens Party				0	1	0	1	0
Vacant				2	1	0	0	−1
Total	27,420,926	100.00	–	9	24	9	24	0
Total votes	5,046,488	–						
Registered voters/turnout	6,487,061	77.79						

Vote share
NP	67.18%
LP	32.71%
Others	0.10%

Senate seats
NP	100.0%
LP	0.0%
Others	0.0%

== Defeated incumbents ==
1. Enrique Magalona (Liberal) retired from politics
2. Macario Peralta Jr. (Liberal) appointed Secretary of National Defense in 1962

== See also ==
- Also held on this day:
  - 1955 Philippine House of Representatives special elections
  - 1955 Philippine local elections
- Commission on Elections
- 3rd Congress of the Philippines
