= Teodoro de Vera =

Filipino lawyer and politician

The Honorable Teodoro de Vera
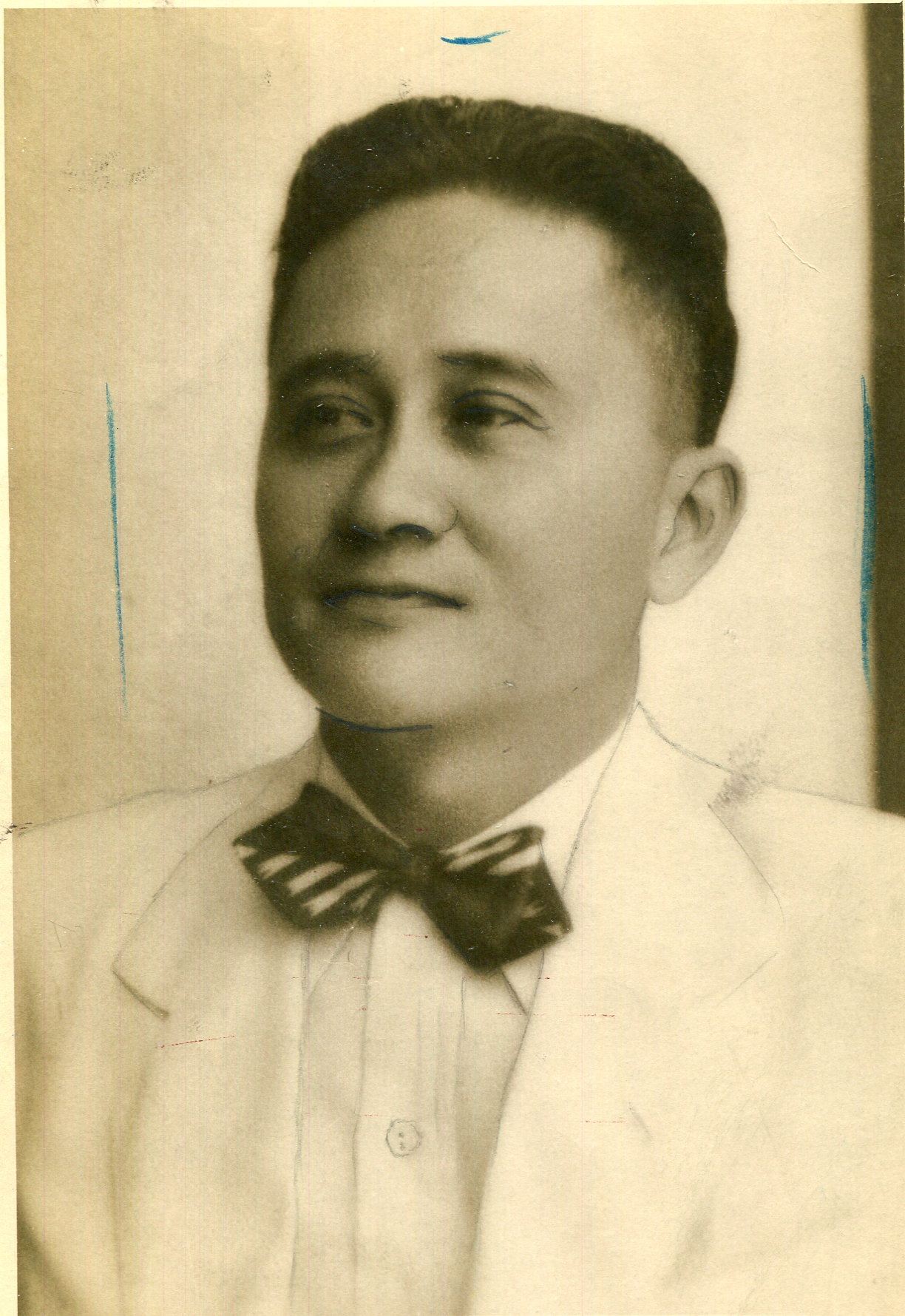

Senator of the Philippines
- In office December 30, 1949 – April 3, 1952

Member of the House of Representatives from Sorsogon's 2nd district
- In office June 11, 1945 – May 25, 1946
- Preceded by: Tomas Clemente
- Succeeded by: Tomas Clemente

Governor of Sorsogon
- In office 1941–1942
- Preceded by: Teodisio R. Diño
- Succeeded by: Silverio Garcia

Personal details
- Party: Liberal (1946-????)
- Other political affiliations: Nacionalista (before 1946)

Teodoro Perez de Vera was a Filipino lawyer and politician.

== Political career ==
Teodoro de Vera briefly served in the House of Representatives representing the 2nd district of Sorsogon from 1945 to 1946. In 1949, he was elected to the Senate of the Philippines as a candidate of the Liberal Party and served until 1952, when he was removed following an election protest by Claro M. Recto.

== Personal life ==
His father was Vicente de Vera, himself a former senator and chairman of the Commission on Elections (COMELEC) from 1947 to 1951, which led to an unsuccessful attempt by the younger de Vera's rivals in the Nacionalista Party to have the elder de Vera removed by the Supreme Court as COMELEC chairman due to a supposed conflict of interest in his son's election in 1949.
