= Pedro Sabido =

Filipino diplomat

Pedro R. Sabido
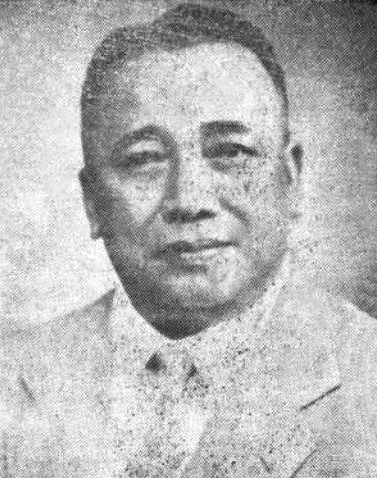

Senator of the Philippines
- In office December 30, 1955 – December 30, 1961

Philippine Ambassador to Spain and Vatican
- In office 1953–1955
- President: Ramon Magsaysay

Member of the House of Representatives from Albay's 3rd district Member of the Philippine Assembly (1935–1939)
- In office September 16, 1935 – November 3, 1939
- Preceded by: Sulpicio Cea
- Succeeded by: Marcial Rañola
- In office June 6, 1922 – June 5, 1934
- Preceded by: Mariano Marbella
- Succeeded by: Sulpicio Cea

Personal details
- Born: October 19, 1894 Polangui, Albay, Captaincy General of the Philippines
- Died: February 3, 1980 (aged 85)
- Party: Nacionalista
- Spouse: Gloria Madrid
- Children: 2
- Profession: Lawyer

Pedro Sabido y Ribaya (October 19, 1894 – February 3, 1980) was a Filipino lawyer, politician, and diplomat who served as senator from 1955 to 1961, ambassador of the Philippines to Spain and the Vatican from 1953 to 1955, and delegate from Albay's 3rd district from 1922 to 1934 and from 1935 to 1939.

== Early life and education ==
Sabido was born on October 19, 1894 to Don Juan D. Sabido and Doña Maximina Ribaya. He attended his elementary and high school studies at the Seminario Colegio de Nueva Caceres. He graduated from the Seminary College of Naga with the degree of Bachelor of Laws and Philosophy degree in 1916 and was made honorary member of Real Academia Española, Spain in 1927.

== Political career ==
=== Philippine legislature ===
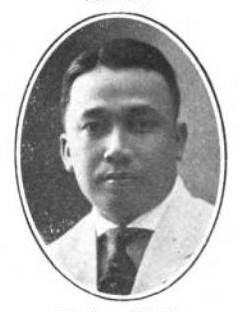
Sabido as member of the House of Representatives, c. 1923

Sabido was elected Representative from the third district of Albay to the House of Representatives of the Philippine Islands (later Philippine Assembly) continuously in 1922 for a period of 16 years. He was also Chairman of the important Committees on Public Works, on Revision of Laws and on Mines. During his term in the Philippine Legislature, Sabido was prevailed upon by the President Manuel L. Quezon to serve in the Executive Department of the Government as Chairman and General Manager of the National Abaca and other Fibers Corporation (NAFCO) and later on as Executive Affairs in the Cabinet of the President Jose P. Laurel, Sr.

=== Ambassadorship ===
In 1953, President Ramon Magsaysay appointed Sabido as Ambassador to Spain and the Vatican. He had to relinquish his diplomatic post in 1955 when he was drafted by the Nacionalista Party to become one of its candidates for Senator and won the said election.

=== Senate ===
As a Senator, he was the chairman of the Committee on Banks, Corporations and Franchise, Committee on Health of the Senate, a member of the Commission on Appointments. His work in the Senate has merited the recognition of the press and noted one of the Outstanding Senators of the Year consistently for five years from 1956 to 1961.

== Personal life ==
He was married to Gloria Madrid, with whom he had a son and a daughter.
