= Pacita Madrigal-Warns =

Filipina ballet dancer and politician

The Honorable Pacita Madrigal-Warns
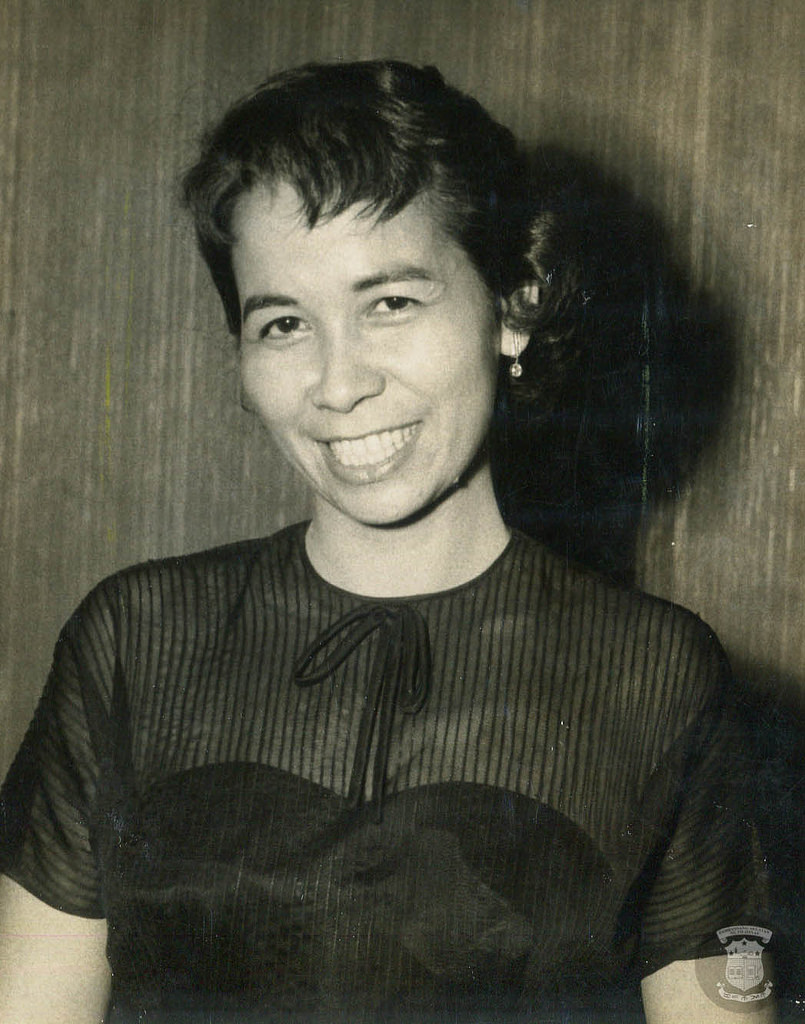
- Madrigal-Warns in 1955

Senator of the Philippines
- In office December 30, 1955 – December 30, 1961

Secretary of Social Welfare Administration
- In office 1953–1955
- President: Ramon Magsaysay
- Preceded by: Asuncion A. Perez
- Succeeded by: Amparo Villamor

Personal details
- Born: María Paz Madrigal y Paterno; May 4, 1915 Manila, Philippine Islands
- Died: September 12, 2008 (aged 93) Manila, Philippines
- Party: Nacionalista
- Spouse(s): Herman Warns (m. 1945, d. 1956); Gonzalo Wilfrado Gonzalez (m. 1956)
- Children: 2 (1 each from Warns and Gonzales)
- Education: Sorbonne University; University of Santo Tomas
- Occupation: Politician
- Profession: Ballet dancer

Maria Paz Paterno Madrigal-Warns (nee Madrigal) (May 4, 1915 – September 12, 2008), commonly known as Pacita Madrigal-Warns (from 1945 to 1956), later Pacita Madrigal Gonzalez (from 1956 until her death), was a Filipina ballet dancer, former beauty queen, and politician. She served as the administrator of the Social Welfare Administration (SWA) under Ramon Magsaysay's cabinet from 1953 to 1955 and was a Senator of the Philippines from 1955 to 1961 during the Third and Fourth Congresses; she was the second woman to be elected to the Philippine Senate. As a senator, Madrigal-Warns authored the bill that would become Republic Act No. 3060, which created the Board of Censors for Motion Pictures in 1961.

In 1970, a corruption scandal at the National Cottage Industries Development Authority (NACIDA) led to Madrigal-Warns' resignation as its administrator.

== Early life and education ==
Maria Paz Paterno Madrigal was born on May 4, 1915, to Vicente Madrigal López of Albay, a Filipino-Spanish business tycoon and senator from 1945 to 1953 and Susana Ramos Paterno of Laguna. Second of seven siblings, Maria Paz, or Pacita, grew up in San Miguel, Manila.

Madrigal-Warns studied in Philippine Women's University and became Colegio de San Juan de Letran's Princess of Education at the age of fifteen. She graduated class valedictorian in the same school, and later entered Sorbonne University in Paris. She took business administration degree at the University of Santo Tomas where she graduated magna cum laude. She also took finishing courses at the Le Collège Féminin de Bouffemont in France, and at Dale Carnegie Course and Powers School in New York.

In 1934, she joined the Manila Carnival (equivalent to today's Binibining Pilipinas) under the sponsorship of Dee Tees, the country's leading publication during that era. She was defeated by Clarita Tankiang, a Chinese mestiza, for the crown.

In 1941, Madrigal-Warns was in New York when the Second World War reached the Philippines. During that time, Pacita enlisted as a volunteer nurse for the Red Cross and Walter Reed Army Medical Center.

== Political career ==
After the war, Madrigal married Herman Warns, an executive of the Manila Gas Corporation. In 1952, she represented the League of Women Voters, the Triennial Congress of International Alliance of Women in Naples, Italy and UNESCO Seventh General Conference in Geneva. From 1945 to 1953, Madrigal-Warns managed her husband's ballet school. Later that year, she gave up the administration of their school to head the Women for Magsaysay Movement (WMPM), which supported the candidacy of the then Ramon Magsaysay for presidency. Upon his assumption of office, Magsaysay appointed Madrigal-Warns as the chief of the Social Welfare Administration (SWA) in 1953. Later, she re-structured the organization of WMPM from a civic organization to a social welfare society. She also established the Samahang Manang Pacita (Manang Pacita Movement) which focused on community development.

In 1955, she decided to run for the Senate under the Nacionalista banner, where she obtained the topnotch slot garnering a total vote of 2,544,716, or 50.4% of the total vote turnouts. Madrigal-Warns became the second female senator of the Philippines after Geronima Pecson. During her term, she was the chairperson of the Senate Committee on Social Justice. Community Development and Welfare. She was also the lone woman in the upper house during the 3rd (1954–1957) and 4th Congresses (1958–1961).

In 1956, Madrigal-Warns married Gonzalo Wilfrado Gonzales, a lawyer, after the death of Herman Warns. She unsuccessfully bid for re-election in 1961, ended up being 11th, which was said to be due to the accusations of her public funds misuse in 1956.

In 1956, Madrigal-Gonzales was charged with malversation, misappropriation and misuse of public funds of the Social Welfare Administration during the years of 1954–1955, which was later remanded to a lower court by the Supreme Court in 1963.

In the late 1960s, Madrigal-Gonzales served as the administrator of the National Cottage Industries Development Authority (NACIDA). By 1970, the National Union of Students of the Philippines (NUSP) as chaired by Edgar Jopson began calling for her removal due to alleged corruption in the agency during her tenure, which forced her to resign in late March 1970.

== Personal life ==
Pacita Madrigal was married to Herman Warns from 1945 until his death in 1956. They had one issue, Vicente Madrigal Warns, known as "Bu Madrigal".

At the death of Warns, Madrigal married lawyer Gonzalo Wilfrado Rafols Gonzalez, son of Bienvenido Ma. Gonzalez, an educator and president of the University of the Philippines from 1939 to 1943 and 1945–1951. They had one child, Ana Maria Gizela Madrigal Gonzalez.

Madrigal-Warns is the aunt of Jamby Madrigal, who also served as senator from 2004 to 2010.

She died on September 12, 2008.

== Legacy ==
- Pacita Madrigal Warns - Mababang Paaralan ng Bagong Silang (Calatagan, Batangas)
