= Esteban Abada =

Filipino politician

The Honorable Esteban Raymundo Abada
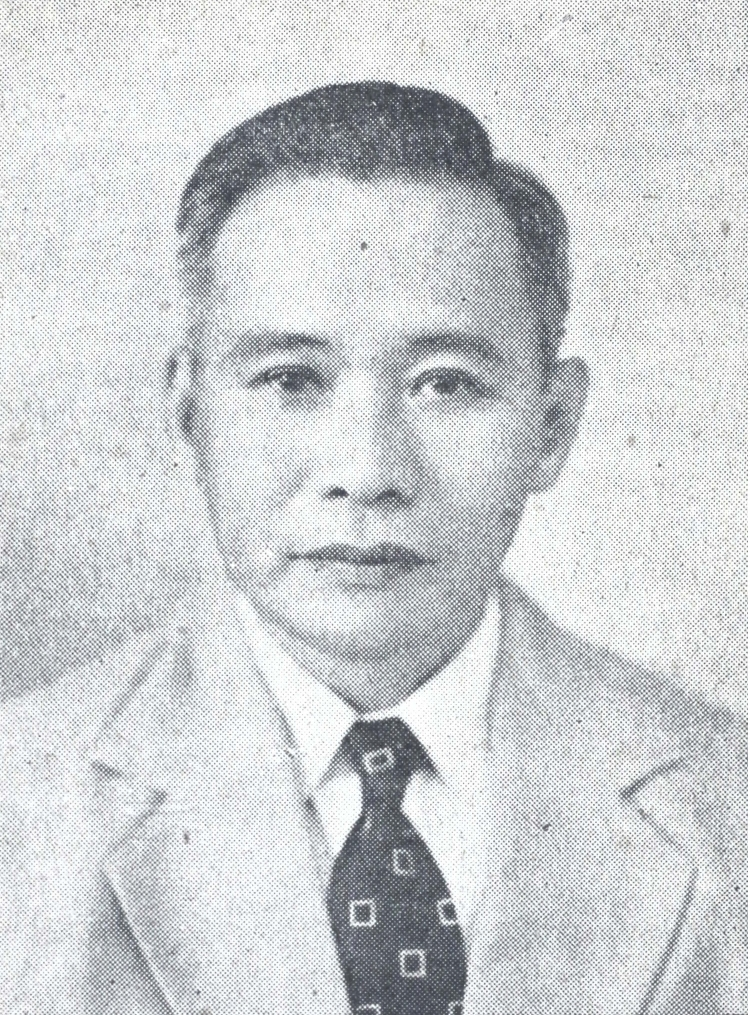
- Abada in 1947

Senator of the Philippines
- In office December 30, 1949 – December 17, 1954

President pro tempore of the Senate of the Philippines
- In office March 2, 1952 – May 7, 1952
- Preceded by: Quintín Paredes
- Succeeded by: Manuel Briones

Personal details
- Born: March 15, 1896 Seravia, Negros Occidental, Captaincy General of the Philippines
- Died: December 17, 1954 (aged 58) New York City, U.S.
- Party: Liberal

Esteban Raymundo Abada (March 15, 1896 – December 17, 1954) was a Filipino politician who served as senator from 1949 until his death in 1954. He also held the position of President pro tempore of the Senate of the Philippines briefly in 1952. Prior to becoming a senator, Abada held various posts in the Department of Education.

== Early life and education ==
Esteban Abada was born on March 15, 1896, in Seravia, present-day Enrique B. Magalona in the Philippine province of Negros Occidental. His parents were Jeronimo Abada and Petra Jereza. After elementary school in Kabankalan, he completed the Philippine Normal School in 1915.

== Teaching career ==
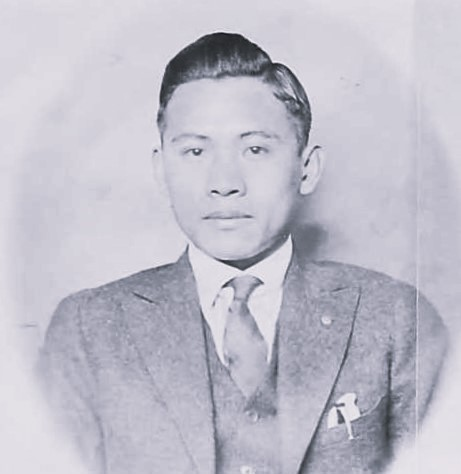
Abada on his U.S. passport application in 1922

After graduation, he was employed as an elementary school teacher for almost a year before being appointed principal in 1916. From 1917, Abada was supervising teacher until he left for the United States in September 1919 for further education at the expense of the Philippine government. There he completed a Bachelor of Arts degree at the University of Michigan in 1922. After returning to the Philippines, Abada was a high school teacher in Bacolod until 1924, principal of Zambales High School (1924–1925), Batangas High School (1925–1926) and Pangasinan Academic High School (1926-1927). Afterwards, he served as School Superintendent in Zambales, Capiz and Tarlac. In 1939, Abada was appointed Administrative Officer with the Bureau of Public Schools.

== Political career ==
After World War II, Abada was appointed Director of Public Schools by President Manuel Roxas in 1946, and in 1948 he was appointed Deputy Minister of Education. The following year, in the 1949 elections, Abada was elected to the Senate of the Philippines on behalf of the Liberal Party with the second highest number of votes. His focus in the Senate was also on education. For example, he chaired the Senate Committee on Education and initiated several laws to benefit education in the Philippines. From March to May 1952, Abada served as Senate President Pro-Tempore. At some point during his time as senator, he was also a member of the Philippine delegation to the United Nations General Assembly.

== Death ==
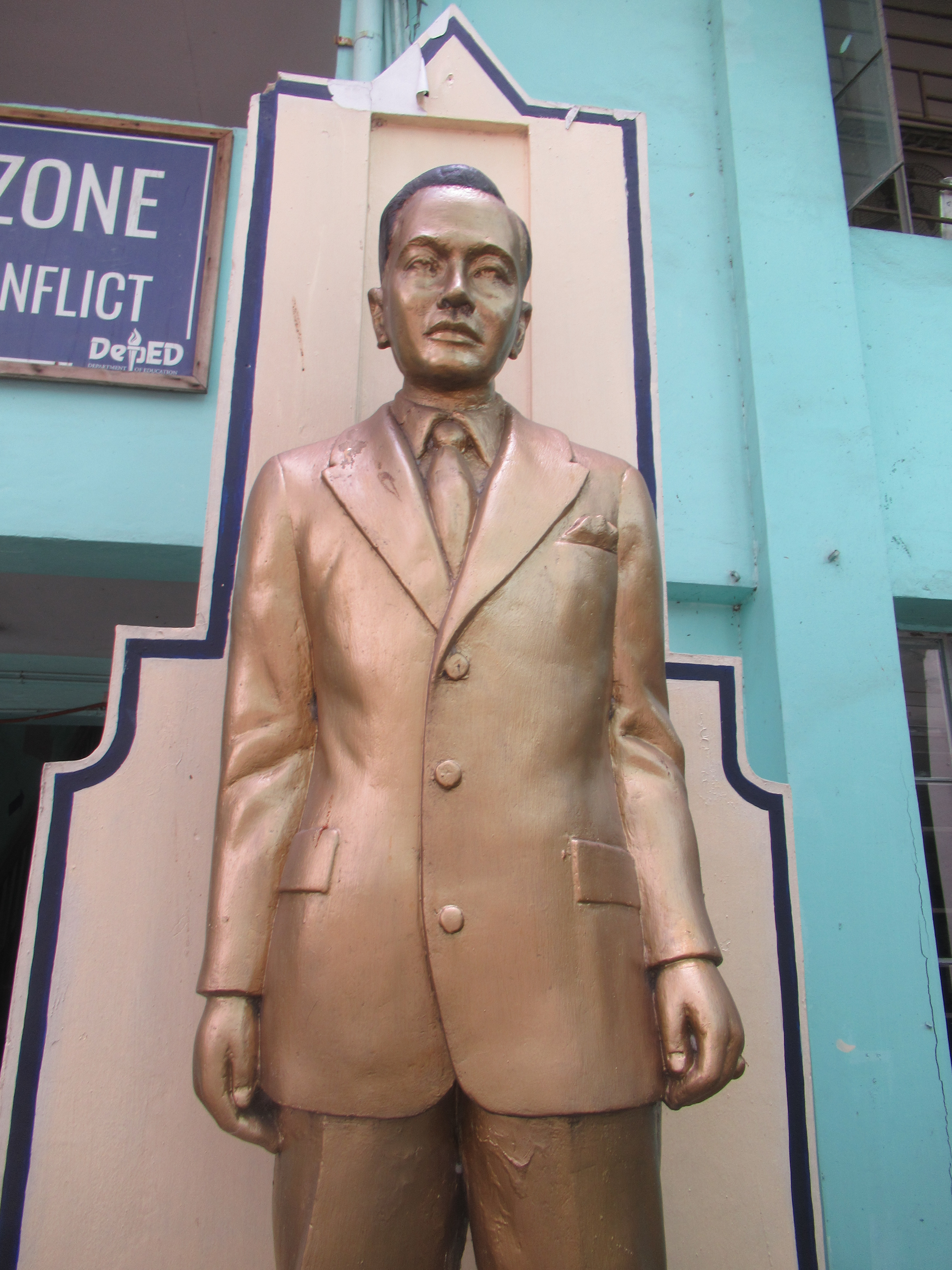
Bust of Esteban Abada in Esteban Abada High School, Blumentritt Road, Manila

Esteban Abada died in 1954 before the end of his term as senator at the age of 58 in New York. He had traveled there for medical treatment. He was married to Purificacion Morente and had two children with her. The Esteban Abada Elementary School in Quezon City and the Esteban Abada High School in Sampaloc (Manila) are named after him.
