= Lorenzo Sumulong =

Filipino lawyer and politician (1905-1997)

The Honorable Lorenzo Sumulong
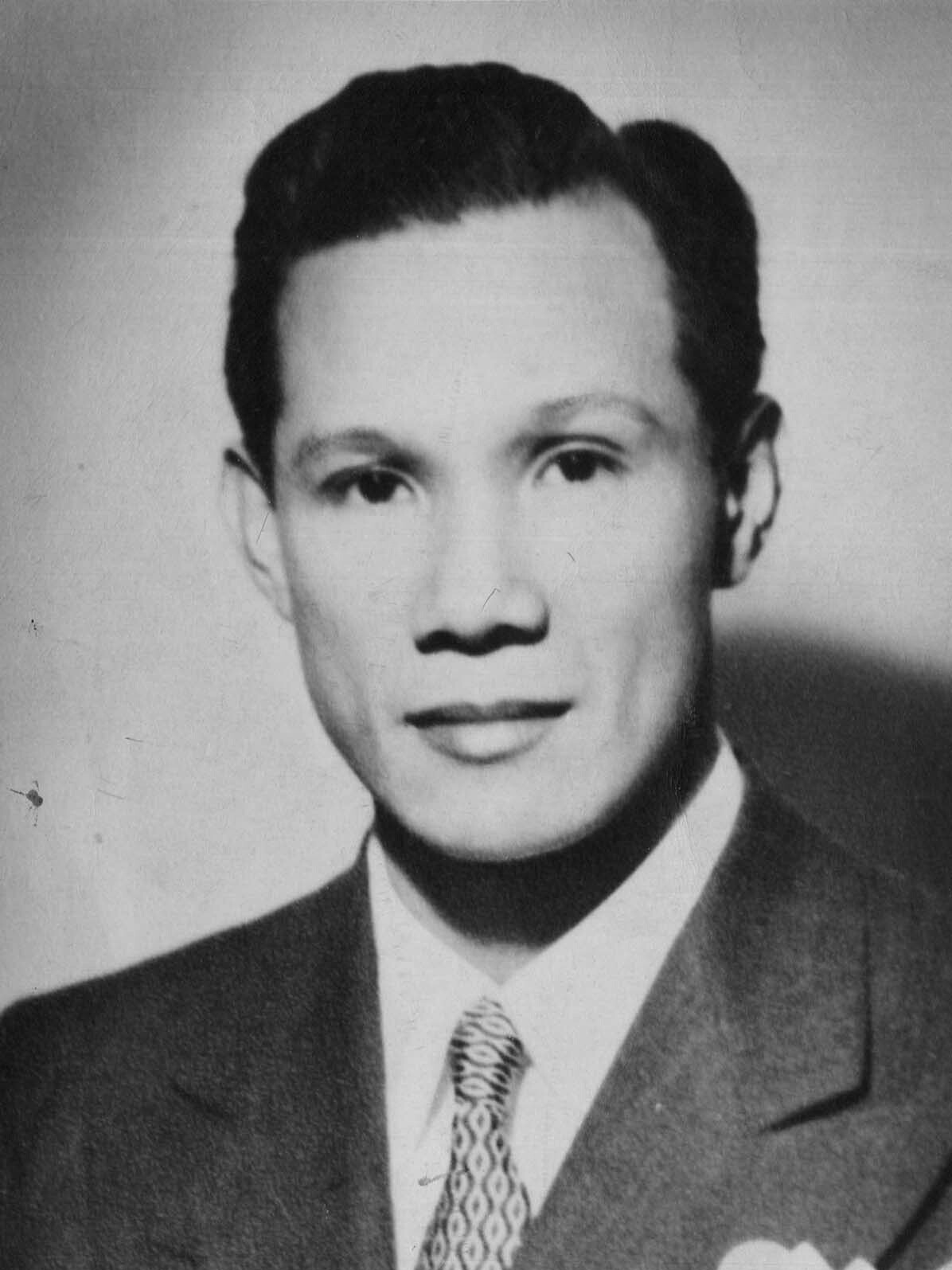

Senator of the Philippines
- In office December 30, 1949 – December 30, 1967
- In office December 30, 1969 – September 23, 1972

President pro tempore of the Senate of the Philippines
- In office January 17, 1966 – January 26, 1967
- President: Arturo Tolentino
- Preceded by: Fernando Lopez
- Succeeded by: Camilo Osías

Member of the House of Representatives of the Philippines from Rizal's 2nd District
- In office May 25, 1946 – December 30, 1949
- Preceded by: Emilio de la Paz
- Succeeded by: Emilio de la Paz

Member of the Philippine Constitutional Commission
- In office June 2, 1986 – October 15, 1986
- President: Corazon Aquino

Personal details
- Born: September 5, 1905 Antipolo, Rizal, Philippine Islands
- Died: October 21, 1997 (aged 92)
- Party: Popular Front (until 1949); Liberal (1949–1955); Nacionalista (1955–1972)
- Spouse: Estrella Rodriguez
- Children: 6, including Victor
- Parent(s): Juan Sumulong (father); Maria Salome Sumulong (mother)
- Relatives: Francisco Sumulong (brother); Corazon Aquino (niece); Josephine C. Reyes (niece); Peping Cojuangco (nephew); Noynoy Aquino (grandnephew); Kris Aquino (grandniece); Jose W. Diokno (fifth cousin thrice removed)
- Occupation: Politician
- Profession: Lawyer
- Nickname: Enchong

Lorenzo Sumulong Sr. (September 5, 1905 – October 21, 1997) was a Filipino lawyer and politician who served in the Philippine Senate for four decades, and as a delegate of his country to the United Nations. He was noted for having engaged in a debate with Nikita Khrushchev at the United Nations General Assembly that allegedly provoked the Soviet Union Premier to bang his shoe on a desk.

== Early life and education ==
Sumulong was born in Antipolo, Rizal on September 5, 1905 to politician Juan Sumulong and Maria Salome Sumulong. He was the third among eleven siblings; his younger sister Paz attempted to run for the Rizal provincial board under the Liberal Party in 1963 and 1967, but failed to be elected both times. He finished law at the University of the Philippines College of Law and went on to top the 1929 bar examinations. In 1932, he obtained a Masters of Law degree from Harvard Law School.

== Political career ==
Sumulong began his political career as a municipal councilor in Antipolo. In the 1946 general elections, Sumulong won a seat in the House of Representatives, representing the 2nd District of Rizal. In 1949, Sumulong was elected to the Philippine Senate. He won re-election to the Senate in 1955 and in 1961. He did not seek re-election in 1967, but would return to the Senate in the 1969 elections. In all, Sumulong remained in Congress for 24 years, initially under the Liberal Party, but later under the Nacionalista Party. He served through the 1st Congress until the 7th Congress.

During his 21-year stint as senator, Sumulong became the chairman of the Senate Committee on Public Accountability (also known as the Blue Ribbon Committee). Through that high-profile position, he investigated noted national controversies such as the Tambobong-Buenavista Estate deal and the Harry Stonehill scandals.

== Faceoff with Khrushchev ==
Sumulong also served as chairman of the Senate Foreign Relations committee, and in that capacity, he led a Philippine delegation to the 902nd Plenary Meeting of the United Nations General Assembly in 1960. During that meeting, Sumulong took the floor and delivered the following remarks challenging the Soviet Union to allow the people of Eastern Europe the free exercise of their civil and political rights.

My delegation, the Philippine delegation, attaches great importance to this item entitled Declaration on the Granting of Independence to Colonial Countries and Peoples, the allocation of which is now under discussion.

We have been a colonized country. We have passed through all the trials and tribulations of a colonized people. It took us centuries and centuries to fight, to struggle, and to win our fight for the recognition of our independence, and, therefore, it would only be consistent with our history, our experience and our aspirations as a people that we vote in favour of having this item referred to the highest possible level of the General Assembly.

While this is not the occasion to discuss the substance of the item, I would like to place on record my delegation's view on the import as well as on the scope, the extent, the metes and bounds of this item. We feel this to be necessary in view of the statements made at the start of our meeting by the Premier of the Soviet Union. It is our view that the declaration proposed by the Soviet Union should cover the inalienable right to independence not only of the peoples and territories which yet remain under the rule of Western colonial Powers, but also of the peoples of Eastern Europe and elsewhere which have been deprived of the free exercise of their civil and political rights and which have been swallowed up, so to speak, by the Soviet Union.

Khrushchev was incensed by Sumulong's remarks. He denounced the Filipino senator as "a jerk, a stooge and a lackey of imperialism". Khrushchev then took out his shoe, waved it at Sumulong, then banged the shoe on the desk in front of him. The following day, Khrushchev acknowledged that he had offended Sumulong but also asserted that he was likewise offended by the delegate from the Philippines.

== Later life ==
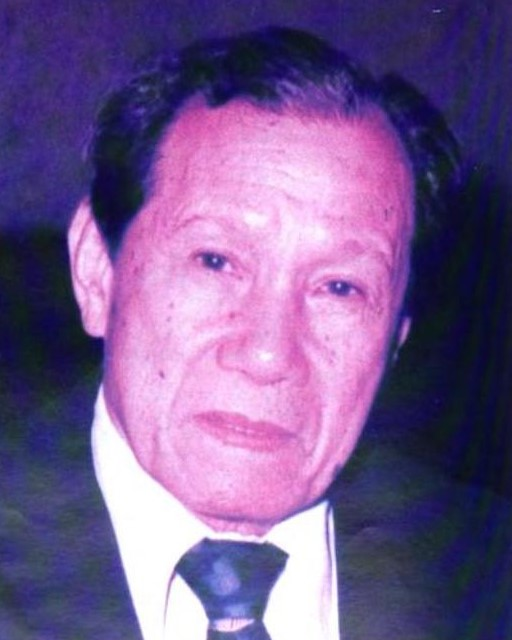
Sumulong from the Official Directory of the Constitutional Commission, c. 1986

Sumulong's service in Congress ended in 1972, with the abolition of the Philippine Senate upon the declaration of martial law by President Ferdinand Marcos. In 1987, President Corazon Aquino named her maternal uncle Lorenzo (sister was Demetria Sumulong Cojuangco) to the Philippine Constitutional Commission of 1986 that drafted the 1987 Philippine Constitution.

Lorenzo is the father of Victor Sumulong, who served as congressman and mayor of Antipolo during the Estrada and Arroyo administrations.

== Personal life ==
Sumulong was married to Estrella Rodriguez and had six children. By way of Francisco Sumulong (born 1695), Sumulong is the fifth cousin thrice removed of Senator Jose W. Diokno, a descendant of Doña Demetria Sumulong y Lindo who moved from Antipolo to Daraga, Albay and Governor-General Felix Berenguer de Marquina.

House of Representatives of the Philippines
Preceded by Emilio de la Paz	Representative, 2nd District of Rizal; 1946 – 1949	Succeeded by Emilio de la Paz
