= 1941 Philippine Senate election =

8th Philippine senatorial election

- November 11, 1941

All 24 seats in the Philippine Senate 13 seats needed for a majority
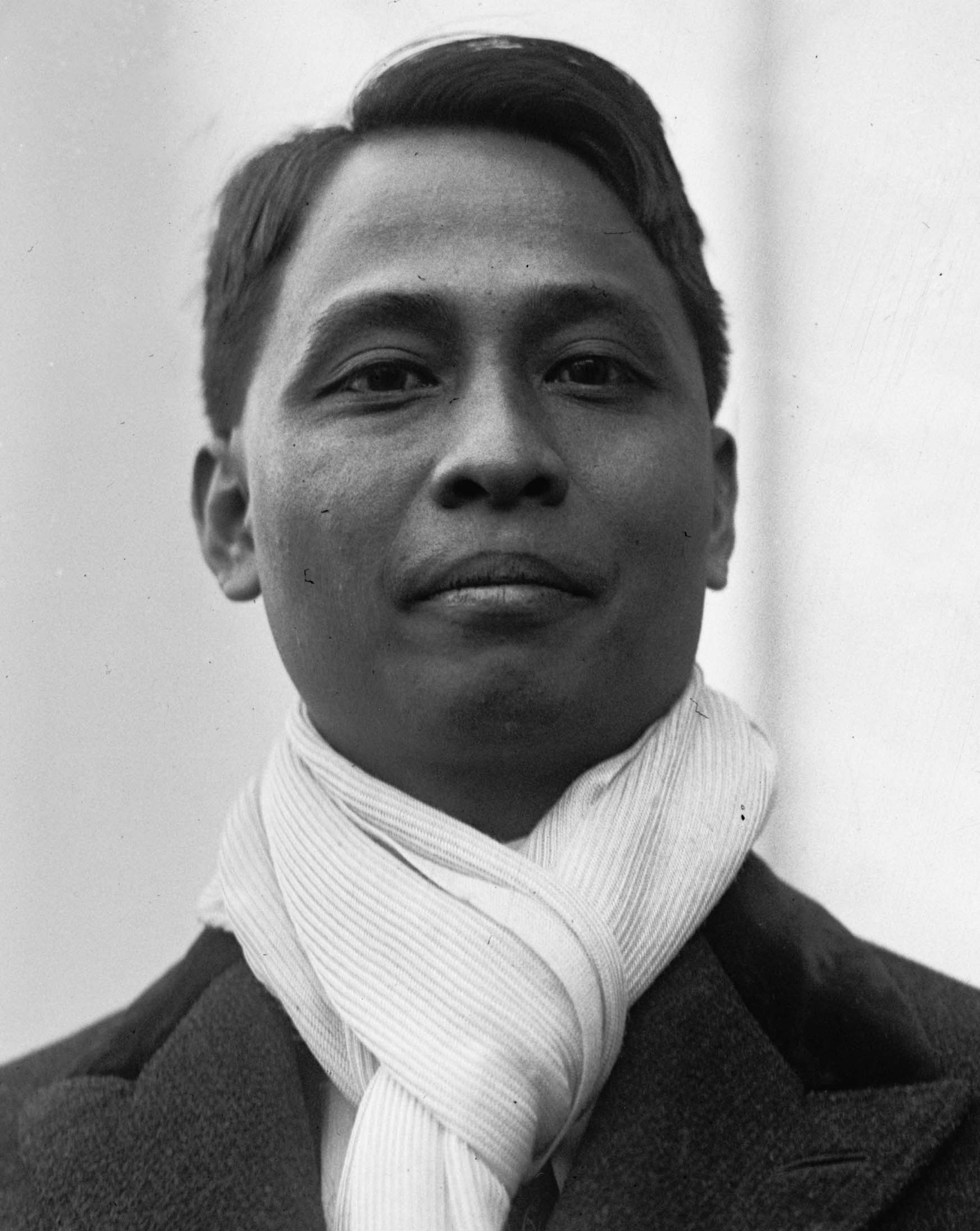

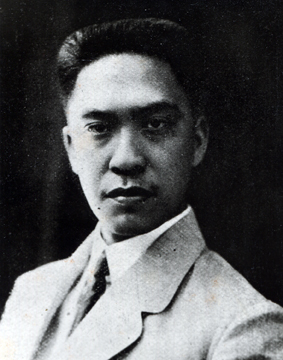
	Majority party	Minority party
Leader	Manuel Roxas	Vicente Sotto
Party	Nacionalista	Popular Front
Seats won	24	0
Seat change	▲24	0
- Representation of results
Elected Senate President
Manuel Roxas
Nacionalista

The 8th election of members to the Senate of the Philippines was held on November 11, 1941. The Senate was re-instituted after amendments to the constitution restored the bicameral legislature last used in 1935.

The elected senators would start to serve only in 1945 as they were not able to take office on December 30, 1941 as Imperial Japan invaded the country on December 8, 1941 at the onset of World War II.

== Electoral system ==
The electorate voted with plurality block voting for the first time for the Senate; the voters have the option of writing the party name on the ballot and all 24 candidates from the party receive votes; another option is by voting individually for each candidate. Also, the former senatorial districts were not used; instead voting was done nationwide as one at-large district. The succeeding Senate elections would be held every two years, with eight seats to be disputed in every election.

The next election was to be on 1943, but due to the intervention of World War II, no elections were until 1946, where the seats supposedly up in 1943 and 1945 were disputed. The winners of the 1941 election were not seated until 1945. In the intervening years, the Second Philippine Republic, a Japanese puppet state, put up a unicameral National Assembly.

== Candidates ==
These were the following tickets:

Total seats up: 24
Party	Total
Nacionalista	24
Popular Front (Sumulong wing)	24
Popular Front (Abad Santos wing)	23
Ganap	22
Modernist	11
Independent	1
Total	105

Nacionalista Party (NP)	Popular Front (Sumulong Wing) (PF-Sumulong)	Popular Front (Abad Santos Wing) (PF-Abad Santos)	Ganap Party (GP)	Modernist Party (MP)
Alauya Alonto	Jose Alejandrino Sr	Jose Alejandrino Sr	Wenceslao Asistido	Pedro Arteche
Nicolas Buendia	Jose Casal	Mariano Balgos	Sixto Bedrus	Vicente del Rosario
Esteban de la Rama	Pedro Coleto	Pedro C. Castro	Marcelino Chavez	Francisco Afan Delgado
Ramon J. Fernandez	Fernando Gardoqui	Mateo del Castillo	Alfredo Dumlao	Santiago Fonacier
Pedro Hernaez	Melchor Lagasca	Francisco Dematera	Jose Jabeon	Manuel Luz
Vicente Madrigal	Marcelino Lontok	Crisanto Evangelista	Fernando Mangson	Flora Ylagan
Rafael Martinez	Mamerto Manalo	Severino Izon	Vicente Pamatinat	Honorio Caringal (withdrew)
Quintin Paredes	Emilio Medina	Ignacio Nabong (withdrew)	Perfecto Reyes	Mariano delos Santos
Vicente Rama	Jose Padilla Sr.	Jose M. Nava	Florentino Subayno	Crisanto Evangelista
Manuel Roxas	Francisco Ramos	Datu Tampugao Pagayao	Eulalio Tolentino	Melchor Lagasca
Proceso Sebastian	Geronimo Santiago	Narcisa Paguibitan	Prudencio Vega	Josefa Martinez
Ramon Torres	Vicente Sotto	Hadji Usman	Gaudencio Bautista	—N/a
Melecio Arranz	Jose M. Bayot	Angel Ancajas	Ciriaco V. Campomanes	—N/a
Mariano Jesus Cuenco	Felicidad Climaco	Isabello Caballero	Esteban Coruna	—N/a
Antonio de las Alas	Jose Gamboa	Severo Dava	Joaquin Flavier	—N/a
Carlos P. Garcia	Eliseo Imzon	Isabelo delos Reyes Jr.	Mariano Lumbre	—N/a
Domingo Imperial	Julio A. Llorente	Lino Dizon	Samson Palomares	—N/a
Daniel Maramba	Sixto Lopez	Juan Feleo	Antonio Ramos	—N/a
José Ozámiz	Angel Marin	Manuel Joven	Antipas Soriano	—N/a
Elpidio Quirino	Raymundo Melliza	Norberto Nabong	Aurelio Tankeko	—N/a
Claro M. Recto	Jose Palarca Sr	Jose Padilla Sr.	Ricardo Valdivia	—N/a
Eulogio Rodriguez	Pablo Rocha	Antonio Paguia	Pedro Zaragosa	—N/a
Emiliano Tria Tirona	Filemon Sotto	Antonio Salvador	—N/a	—N/a
Jose Yulo	Juan Villamor	—N/a	—N/a	—N/a

Independents
Manuel Briones

== Results ==
	1	2	3	4	5	6	7	8	9	10	11	12	13	14	15	16	17	18	19	20	21	22	23	24
Before election	‡^	‡^	‡^	‡^	‡^	‡^	‡^	‡^	‡^	‡^	‡^	‡^	‡^	‡^	‡^	‡^	‡^	‡^	‡^	‡^	‡^	‡^	‡^	‡^
Election result	NP																							
After election	+	+	+	+	+	+	+	+	+	+	+	+	+	+	+	+	+	+	+	+	+	+	+	+

=== Per candidate ===
While the tally of votes have been lost in history, some sources tell where each candidate finished in the tally. Claro M. Recto finished first, while Mariano Jesus Cuenco finished fifth, and Vicente Rama finished 16th.

Not all candidates of the same party finished with the same number of votes, as some voted individually per candidate, instead of just writing the party name, and some didn't complete the 24 names if they did choose to vote individually per candidate.

Candidate	Party	Votes	%
Claro M. Recto (Note: Detained for collaboration with the Japanese and were not able to take office.)	Nacionalista Party	1,084,003	64.81
Manuel Roxas	Nacionalista Party	1,076,389	64.36
Quintin Paredes	Nacionalista Party	1,046,715	62.58
Jose Yulo	Nacionalista Party	1,035,025	61.88
Elpidio Quirino	Nacionalista Party	1,013,095	60.57
Antonio de las Alas	Nacionalista Party	1,002,853	59.96
Emiliano Tria Tirona	Nacionalista Party	983,740	58.82
Eulogio Rodriguez	Nacionalista Party	982,144	58.72
Vicente Madrigal	Nacionalista Party	977,119	58.42
Mariano Jesús Cuenco	Nacionalista Party	974,683	58.28
Melecio Arranz	Nacionalista Party	973,403	58.20
Carlos P. Garcia	Nacionalista Party	972,034	58.12
Ramon Torres	Nacionalista Party	962,836	57.57
Domingo Imperial	Nacionalista Party	959,633	57.38
Daniel Maramba	Nacionalista Party	959,390	57.36
Pedro Hernaez	Nacionalista Party	949,238	56.76
Ramón J. Fernández	Nacionalista Party	947,798	56.67
José Ozámiz	Nacionalista Party	947,106	56.63
Nicolas Buendia	Nacionalista Party	944,315	56.46
Esteban de la Rama	Nacionalista Party	937,746	56.07
Vicente Rama	Nacionalista Party	934,254	55.86
Proceso Sebastián	Nacionalista Party	930,179	55.62
Alauya Alonto	Nacionalista Party	919,348	54.97
Rafael Martinez (Note: Substituted for Norberto Romualdez who died a few days before the election.)	Nacionalista Party	871,971	52.14
Vicente Sotto	Popular Front (Sumulong wing) (Note: The Popular Front was split into two wings: those who supported Pedro Abad Santos or the "Abad Santos wing" and those who supported Juan Sumulong or the "Sumulong wing".)	229,276	13.71
Filemon Sotto	Popular Front (Sumulong wing)	191,815	11.47
José Alejandrino	Popular Front (Sumulong wing)	128,077	7.66
José Padilla Sr.	Popular Front (Sumulong wing)	127,557	7.63
Emilio Medina	Popular Front (Sumulong wing)	125,896	7.53
Eliseo Imzon	Popular Front (Sumulong wing)	123,540	7.39
Geronimo Santiago	Popular Front (Sumulong wing)	120,005	7.18
Manuel Briones	Independent	118,804	7.10
Isabelo delos Reyes Jr.	Popular Front (Abad Santos wing)	117,339	7.02
Sixto Lopez	Popular Front (Sumulong wing)	116,888	6.99
Juan Villamor	Popular Front (Sumulong wing)	116,437	6.96
Jose Palarca Sr.	Popular Front (Sumulong wing)	115,087	6.88
Raymundo Melliza	Popular Front (Sumulong wing)	114,987	6.88
Arsenio Suazo	Popular Front (Sumulong wing)	110,210	6.59
Angel Marin	Popular Front (Sumulong wing)	110,007	6.58
Jose M. Bayot	Popular Front (Sumulong wing)	109,667	6.56
Felicidad Climaco	Popular Front (Sumulong wing)	109,610	6.55
Julio A. Llorente	Popular Front (Sumulong wing)	109,480	6.55
Jose Gamboa	Popular Front (Sumulong wing)	108,798	6.51
Pedro Coleto	Popular Front (Sumulong wing)	107,365	6.42
Marcelino Lontok	Popular Front (Sumulong wing)	104,117	6.23
Mamerto Manalo	Popular Front (Sumulong wing)	102,798	6.15
Fernando Gardoqui	Popular Front (Sumulong wing)	99,889	5.97
Crisanto Evangelista	Popular Front (Abad Santos wing)	97,554	5.83
Norberto Nabong	Popular Front (Abad Santos wing)	97,231	5.81
Juan Feleo	Popular Front (Abad Santos wing)	96,740	5.78
Jose M. Nava	Popular Front (Abad Santos wing)	94,887	5.67
Angel Ancajas	Popular Front (Abad Santos wing)	91,005	5.44
Lino Dizon	Popular Front (Abad Santos wing)	88,547	5.29
Jose Casal	Popular Front (Sumulong wing)	85,403	5.11
Pablo Rocha	Popular Front (Sumulong wing)	84,996	5.08
Melchor Lagasca	Popular Front (Sumulong wing)	82,009	4.90
Antonio Paguia	Popular Front (Abad Santos wing)	80,468	4.81
Mateo del Castillo	Popular Front (Abad Santos wing)	79,368	4.75
Severino Izon	Popular Front (Abad Santos wing)	76,682	4.58
Antonio Salvador	Popular Front (Abad Santos wing)	76,413	4.57
Hadji Usman	Popular Front (Abad Santos wing)	76,397	4.57
Pedro C. Castro	Popular Front (Abad Santos wing)	75,558	4.52
Francisco Dematera	Popular Front (Abad Santos wing)	68,773	4.11
Isabello Caballero	Popular Front (Abad Santos wing)	67,588	4.04
Perfecto Reyes	Ganap Party	65,002	3.89
Mariano P. Balgos	Popular Front (Abad Santos wing)	64,799	3.87
Alfredo Dumlao	Ganap Party	64,553	3.86
Manuel Joven	Popular Front (Abad Santos wing)	62,006	3.71
Severo Dava	Popular Front (Abad Santos wing)	61,956	3.70
Ciriaco V. Campomanes	Ganap Party	57,440	3.43
Vicente Pamatinat	Ganap Party	55,211	3.30
Ricardo Valdivia	Ganap Party	55,044	3.29
Narcisa Paguibitan	Popular Front (Abad Santos wing)	54,632	3.27
Francisco Ramos	Popular Front (Sumulong wing)	54,189	3.24
Datu Tampugao Pagayao	Popular Front (Abad Santos wing)	53,953	3.23
Samson Palomares	Ganap Party	50,489	3.02
Esteban Coruna	Ganap Party	50,113	3.00
Fernando Mangson	Ganap Party	48,770	2.92
Eulalio Tolentino	Ganap Party	48,502	2.90
Prudencio Vega	Ganap Party	47,822	2.86
Antipas Soriano	Ganap Party	47,347	2.83
Francisco Robles	Ganap Party	46,883	2.80
Jose Jabeon	Ganap Party	45,984	2.75
Joaquin Flavier	Ganap Party	44,980	2.69
Pedro Zaragosa	Ganap Party	44,669	2.67
Francisco Afan Delgado	Modernist Party	41,890	2.50
Antonio Ramos	Ganap Party	40,008	2.39
Aurelio Tankeko	Ganap Party	37,965	2.27
Sixto Bedrus	Ganap Party	37,714	2.25
Santiago Fonacier	Modernist Party	37,503	2.24
Gaudencio Bautista	Ganap Party	36,912	2.21
Mariano Lumbre	Ganap Party	36,715	2.20
Flora Ylagan	Modernist Party	34,730	2.08
Wenceslao Asistido	Ganap Party	32,803	1.96
Marcelino Chavez	Ganap Party	30,058	1.80
Florentino Subayno	Ganap Party	28,447	1.70
Josefina Martinez	Modernist Party	25,596	1.53
Pedro Arteche	Modernist Party	23,441	1.40
Manuel Luz	Modernist Party	20,004	1.20
Vicente del Rosario	Modernist Party	13,259	0.79
Mariano delos Santos	Modernist Party	11,446	0.68
Honorio Caringal (Note: Withdrew)	Modernist Party	0	0.00
Ignacio Nabong	Popular Front (Abad Santos wing)	0	0.00
Total		29,235,120	100.00
Total votes		1,672,504	–

=== Per party ===
Party	Votes	%	Seats
Nacionalista Party	23,385,017	79.99	24
Popular Front (Sumulong wing)	2,888,103	9.88	0
Popular Front (Abad Santos wing)	1,581,896	5.41	0
Ganap Party	1,053,431	3.60	0
Modernist Party	207,869	0.71	0
Independent	118,804	0.41	0
Total	29,235,120	100.00	24

Vote share
NP	79.99%
Others	20.01%

Senate seats
NP	100%
Others	0%

== See also ==
- Commission on Elections
- Politics of the Philippines
- Philippine elections
