= Gil Puyat =

President of the Senate of the Philippines from 1967 to 1972

The Honorable Gil Puyat
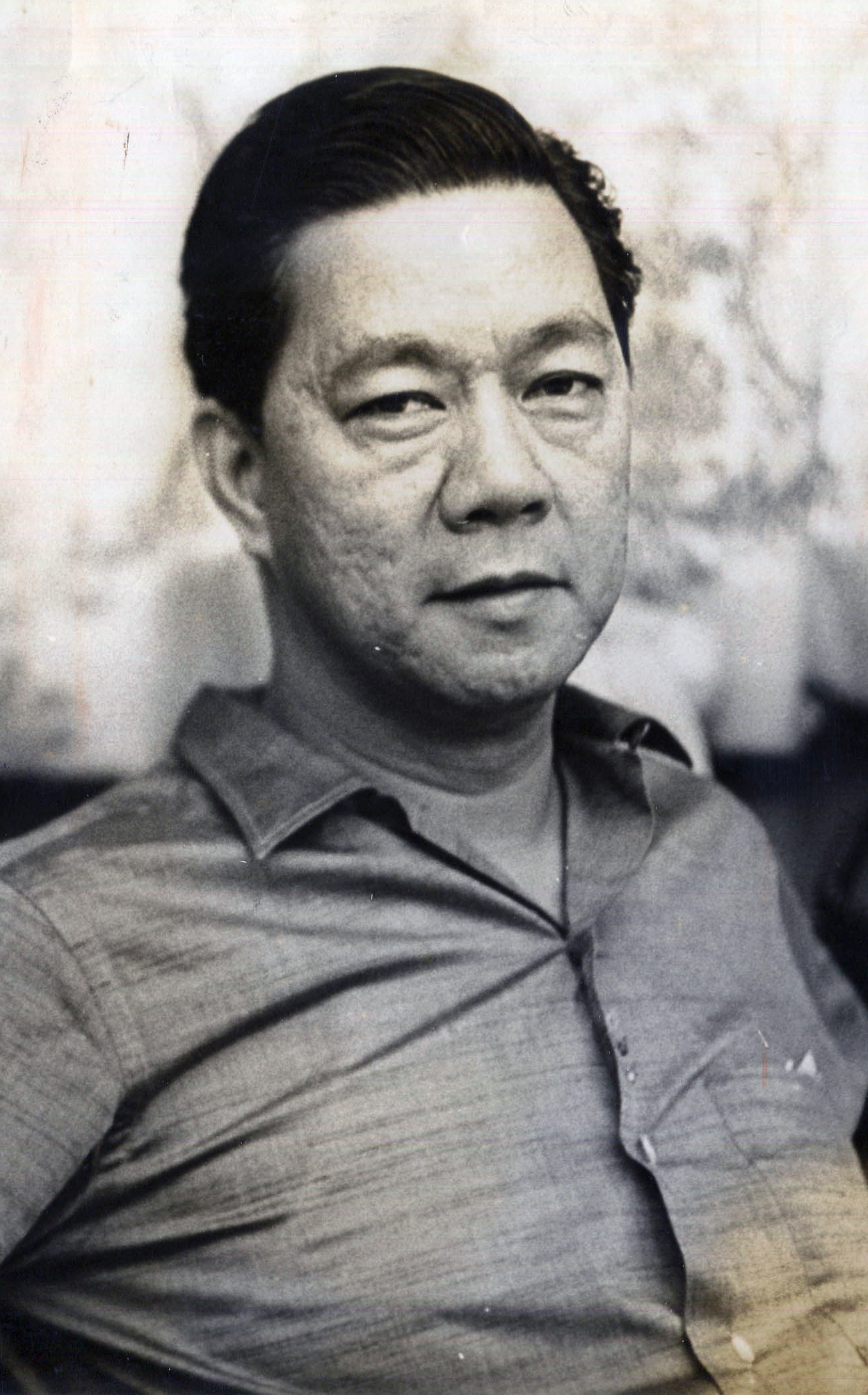

13th President of the Senate of the Philippines
- In office January 26, 1967 – September 23, 1972
- Preceded by: Arturo Tolentino
- Succeeded by: Abolished next held by Jovito Salonga in 1987

Senator of the Philippines
- In office December 30, 1951 – September 23, 1972

President of the Chamber of Commerce of the Philippine Islands
- In office 1945–1949
- Preceded by: Vicente Madrigal
- Succeeded by: Aurelio Pedro Periquet y Ziálcita / Daniel R. Aguinaldo

5th President of the Nacionalista Party
- In office 1964–1970
- Preceded by: Eulogio Rodriguez
- Succeeded by: Jose Roy

Personal details
- Born: Gil Juco Puyat; September 1, 1907 Quiapo, Manila, Philippine Islands
- Died: March 22, 1981 (aged 73) Makati, Philippines
- Resting place: Loyola Memorial Park - Marikina, Philippines
- Party: Nacionalista (1951–1981)
- Spouse: Eugenia Guidote (m. 1935)
- Children: 7
- Relatives: Anna York Bondoc (grandniece); Juan Pablo Bondoc (grandnephew)
- Education: University of the Philippines
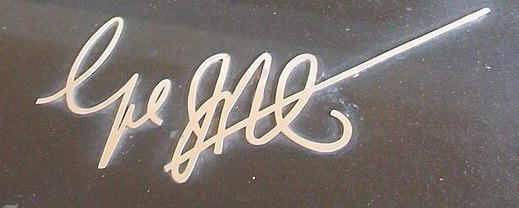
- Signature

Gil Juco Puyat Sr. (September 1, 1907 – March 22, 1981) was a Filipino politician and businessman who served as a Senator of the Philippines from 1951 until 1972, when President Ferdinand Marcos shut Congress down and declared a nationwide martial law, and as Senate President from 1967 to 1972, usurping the seat of Arturo Tolentino. He ran for vice president under the Nacionalista Party in the 1961 presidential election, placing third behind Emmanuel Pelaez and Sergio Osmeña Jr.

== Education ==
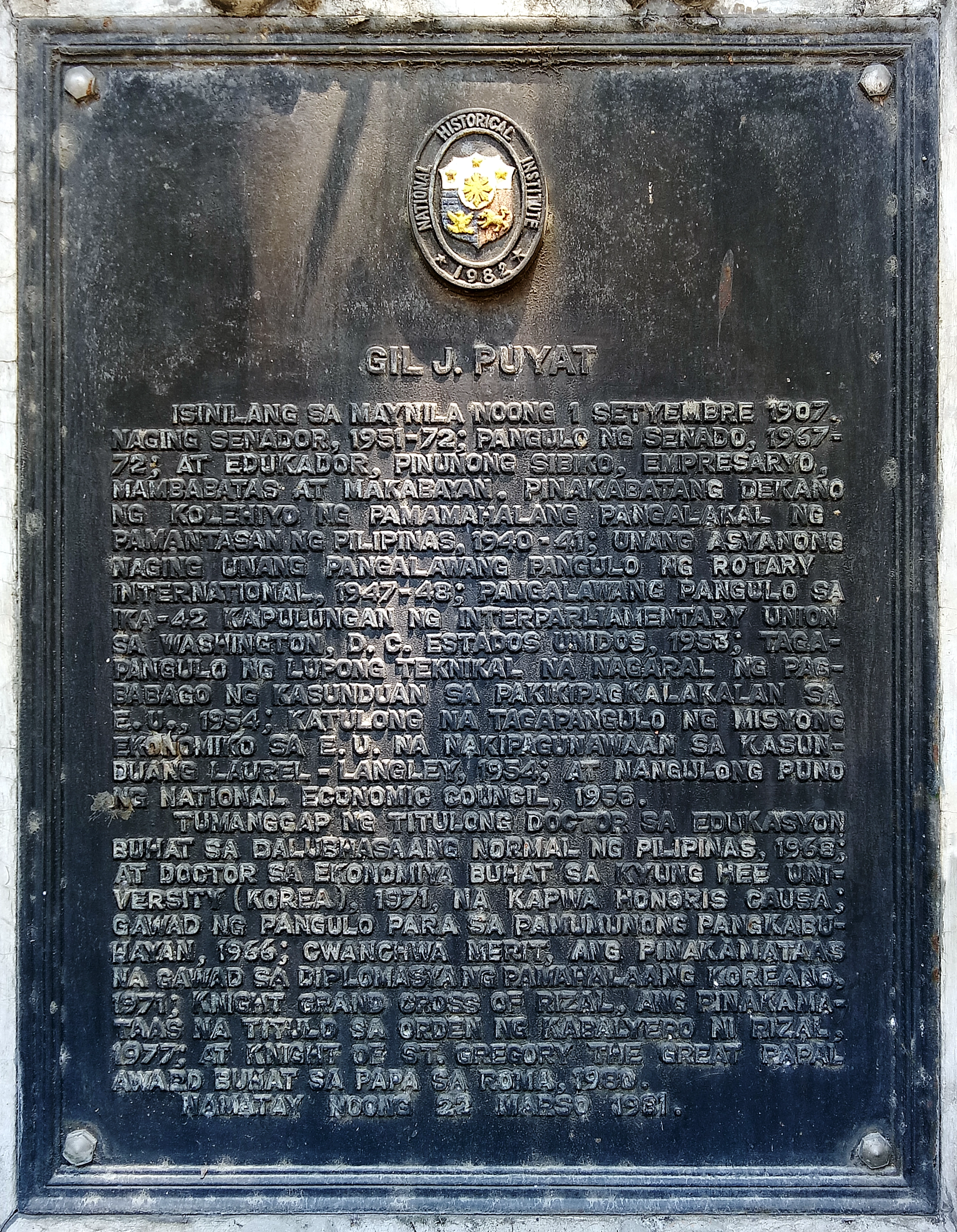
National historical marker installed in 1982 in Quezon City

Having been exposed to the world of business, Puyat was inevitably drawn to a course in commerce for his higher education. This he pursued at the University of the Philippines where he topped his class. Even as a student, he was already immersed in intricate operations of finance and expense, of capital and production, and of management labor handling. Despite his success, he was said to have been a part of a racist and controversial student movement group. He was a member of the college-based Pan Xenia Fraternity and Upsilon Sigma Phi.

== Early career ==
He became a member of the Rotary Club of Manila at about the same time that he was also a young professor of economics at the University of the Philippines. Puyat's skill in managing the family business caught the eye of the late President Manuel L. Quezon. At the time, the country was predominantly agricultural in activity and the President was advocating industrialization. Quezon named the young Puyat as dean of the College of Business Administration at the University of the Philippines when he was 33. An active member of international trades bodies, he acquired international stature in business. The Business Writers’ Association of the Philippines voted him "Business Leader of the Year" in 1948 and the Association of Red Feather Agencies voted him "Civic Leader of the Year" in 1949.

In 1953, he received a plaque from the Community Chest of Greater Manila for “outstanding services as one of the founders, first president and first campaign fund chairman“ of the body. The Philippine Institute of Public Opinion (PIPO) awarded him a certificate of honor for demonstrating national leadership in business, economics, the civic and political fields and for his distinguished service to the youth.

== Political career ==
In the Philippine midterm elections of 1951, he was elected Senator and he served in the Philippine Senate until its closure by Martial Law in 1972. From 1967, he was the Senate President.

As a legislator, Puyat created a few reforms and other things involving the dispensation of public works funds.

== Business activities ==
He is founder of Manila Banking Corporation (now Chinabank Savings), Manila Bankers Life Insurance Corporation and the Loyola Group of Companies. The Loyola Group of Companies is composed of Loyola Plans Consolidated Inc., Group Developers Inc. and Loyola Memorial Chapels and Crematorium Inc.

He founded Loyola Plans Consolidated Inc. in 1968 and today it is the oldest Pre-need Company in continuous operation. Group Developers pioneered the concept of memorial parks in the Philippines with its two signature memorial parks in Marikina and Sucat. Loyola Memorial Chapels was the first to use modern cremation technology in the Philippines. Loyola Memorial Chapels has six branches, all in Luzon.

== Family background ==
Puyat is the third child of Philippine Pioneer Industrialist Gonzalo Puyat and Nicasia Juco, both from Guagua, Pampanga. He was trained early in life by his father, Don Gonzalo, in the trade of manufacturing billiard tables and bowling alleys. Eventually, he assisted in managing the family business of Gonzalo Puyat & Sons, the brand holder of AMF-Puyat, Puyat Steel, and Puyat Vinyl.

Puyat was married to Eugenia Guidote, an accountant and pioneer member of the Philippine Institute of Certified Public Accountants (PICPA), and a trained opera singer (soprano). They had seven children – Gil Jr. (deceased), Vicente (deceased), Antonio (deceased), Victor, Jesusa (deceased), Alfonso and Eugenia.

== Death ==
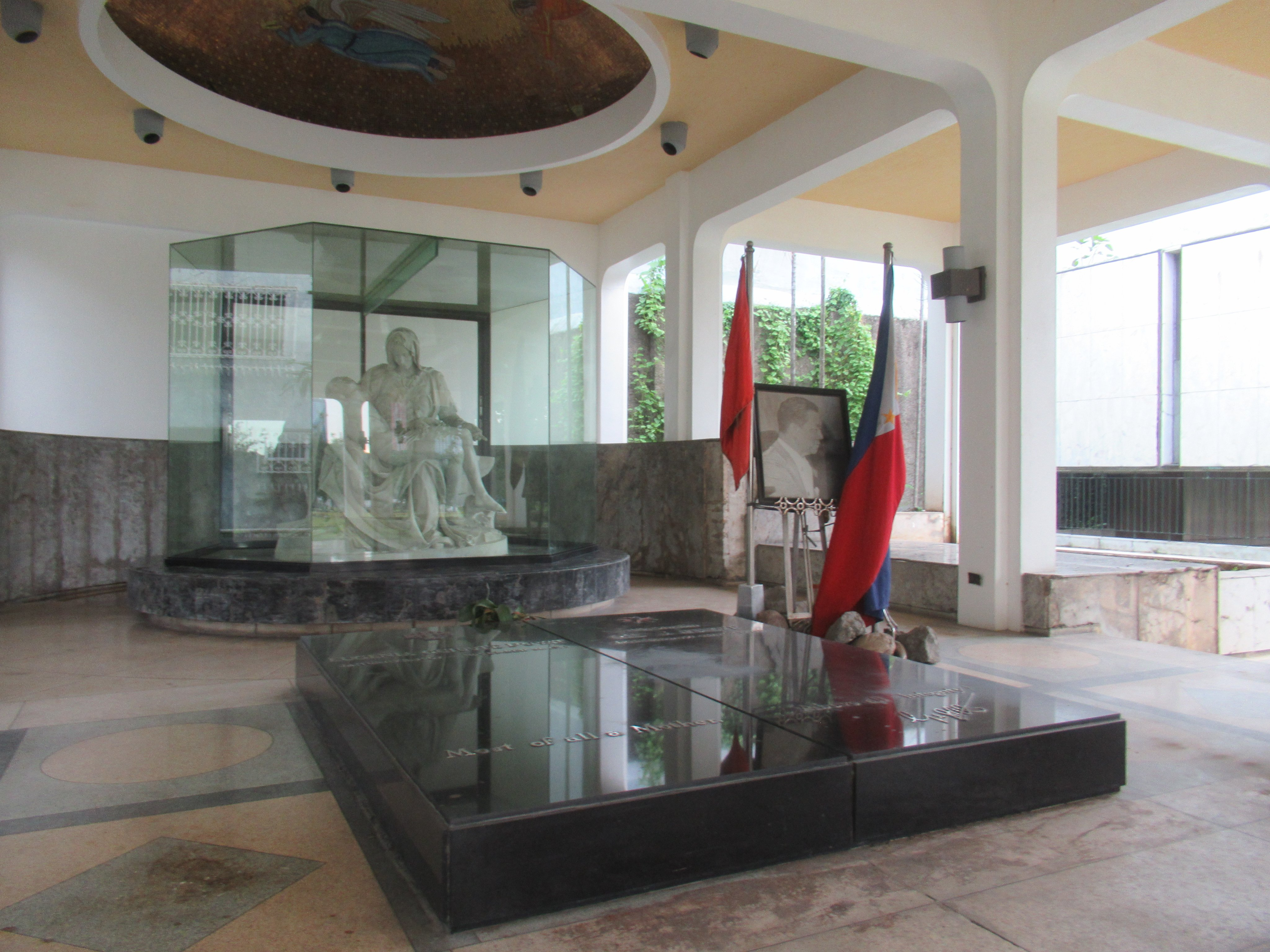
Tomb of Gil and Eugenia Puyat at Loyola Memorial Park, Marikina

In 1978, he was invested as a member of the Order of St. Gregory the Great. He died, 2 years later, on March 22, 1981, due to cardiac arrest, one of the complications of an asthma attack. He was buried on March 28, 1981, at their family mausoleum in Loyola Memorial Park, Marikina.

== Legacy ==
Buendia Avenue, originally named after Nicolas Buendia, was renamed in honor of Gil Puyat through Batas Pambansa Blg. 312, which was passed by the Interim Batasang Pambansa on November 14, 1982. Despite the name change, the original name remains widely used. The Gil Puyat station on the LRT Line 1, located along the avenue, is also named after him.

== Electoral history ==
Electoral history of Gil Puyat
Year	Office	Party	Votes received				Result
Year	Office	Party	Total	%	P.	Swing	Result
1951	Senator of the Philippines	Nacionalista	1,906,402	43.42%	2nd	—N/a	Won
1957	Senator of the Philippines	Nacionalista	2,189,909	42.87%	1st	—N/a	Won
1963	Senator of the Philippines	Nacionalista	3,024,995	39.22%	5th	—N/a	Won
1969	Senator of the Philippines	Nacionalista	4,609,233	56.19%	2nd	—N/a	Won
1961	Vice President of the Philippines	Nacionalista	1,787,987	28.06%	3rd	—N/a	Lost

== External links and sources ==
- Media related to Gil Puyat at Wikimedia Commons
- Official Website of the Philippine Senate – Sen. Gil J. Puyat

Business positions
Preceded by Vicente Madrigal	President of the Chamber of Commerce of the Philippine Islands; 1945–1949	Succeeded by Aurelio Pedro Periquet y Ziálcita
Preceded by Vicente Madrigal	President of the Chamber of Commerce of the Philippine Islands; 1945–1949	Succeeded by Daniel R. Aguinaldo
Senate of the Philippines
Preceded by Arturo Tolentino	President of the Senate of the Philippines; 1967–1972	Vacant Position abolished Title next held by Jovito Salonga
Party political offices
Preceded by José Laurel Jr.	Nacionalista Party nominee for Vice President of the Philippines; 1961	Succeeded by Fernando Lopez
