= Arsenio Luz =

Filipino showman (1888–1966)

The Honorable Arsenio Luz
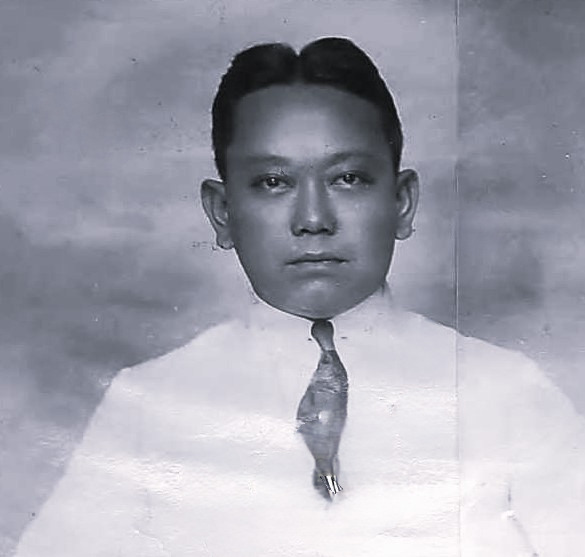
- Luz on his U.S. passport application in 1922

President of the Chamber of Commerce of the Philippine Islands
- In office 1933–1934
- Preceded by: Gonzalo Puyat
- Succeeded by: Eulogio Rodriguez

Personal details
- Born: Arsenio Nicasio Luz y Katigbak; December 14, 1888 Lipa, Batangas, Captaincy General of the Philippines
- Died: 1966 (aged approximately 78) Philippines
- Spouse(s): Amparo Katigbak; Carmen Albert
- Children: Arsenio Norberto Luz Jr; Amparo Margarita Luz; Juan Luz; Carmencita Luz Herlihy
- Parent(s): Manuel Luz (father); Segunda Katigbac (mother)
- Education: Manila Central University
- Profession: Showman; Journalist; Businessman; Professor
- Known for: Director of the Philippine Carnival; Charter member of the BSP
- Religion: Roman Catholicism

Arsenio Nicasio Luz y Katigbak (December 14, 1888 – 1966) was a Filipino showman, businessman, journalist and educator, remembered for being the General-Director of the Philippine Carnival which ran the Manila Carnival. He was an attaché for several Philippine Independence Missions to the U.S. as the representative of the press. He led trade negotiations during the transition to the Commonwealth and served as President Manuel L. Quezon's economic advisor at Malacañang throughout the Commonwealth Period. He was a charter member of the Boy Scouts of the Philippines and the first Filipino President of the Rotary Club of Manila. He was manager of the Philippine Government Commercial Agency's New York branch and represented the Philippines at several conventions and expositions.

== Early life ==
Luz was born on December 14, 1888, to Don Manuel Metra de San Miguel-Luz and Doña Segunda Solis Katigbak, best known as the first love of José Rizal, in Lipa in Batangas province, which had become a city earlier that year.

== Education ==
Luz graduated with a Bachelor of Arts from Liceo de Manila (Manila Central University) and studied law in the Escuela Derecho de Manila. While working for the Philippine Government in New York he took a special course in advanced journalism at Columbia University.

== Career ==
Luz worked at El Renacimiento, and La Vanguardia. From 1913 to 1915 Luz was a professor and head of the Spanish department at the University of the Philippines. He later became editor of the Nacionalista Party's official news organ El Ideal.

In 1919, the Philippine Government sent Luz to the United States to work as a commercial agent and manager in the Philippine Government Commercial Agency, in the Marble Palace 280 Broadway, Manhattan, New York City. Luz served under James J. Rafferty, the director of the agency.

On December 19, 1919, at the New York Agency of the Philippine National Bank, Luz was one of some fifty business men to meet Jaime de Veyra and Teodoro Yangco, the Resident Commissioners of Philippines who represented the Philippines in the U.S. House of Representatives, in order to develop and establish the new Philippine-American Chamber of Commerce. Luz was one of four men appointed to nominate twelve directors for the Chamber and propose a means of the Chambers functioning. The other three men were Charles C. Robinson, vice-president of the Philippines National Bank; Charles D. Orth, of Hanson and Orth; and B. E. Reuter.

As manager of the Philippine Government Commercial Agency, Luz represented the Philippines at the 1920 Foreign Trade Convention of San Francisco. In 1921, he was sent to London, to represent the Philippines at the Tropical Products Exposition

=== Return to the Philippines ===
==== Manila Carnival ====
In 1922, Luz returned to the Philippines after being appointed editor and manager of The Philippines Herald and Director-General of the Philippine Carnival. The Philippine Carnival ran the Manila Carnival. Luz succeeded Jorge B. Vargas, who held the position for a year. In 1932, Luz was recognized as a Publicity Leader in the Philippines due to his position of Director General of the Philippine Carnival which made Philippine progress internationally known. He served as Director-General for 17 of the company's 31 years, until the Carnivals ended in 1939. For his work as the Director General of the Philippine Exposition Inc. Luz was listed as a Manila leading Businessman in Miguel Cornejo's 1939 Commonwealth Directory.

==== Business Ventures ====
Throughout the 1930s Luz became involved in several in several industries. From 1933 to 1941, Luz was a Principal of the Jacob Rosenthal & Co., Inc. In 1934, Luz was an incorporator of the Provident Insurance Company. In 1937, Luz was an incorporator of the Pan-Asiatic Broadcasting System, Inc which manufactured and operated radio transmitters and receivers. In 1938, Luz became a member of the National Produce Exchange in Manila. From 1938 to 1941, Luz was the General Agent of the National Life Insurance Company of the Philippines.

From 1935 to 1941, Luz was involved in numerous oil and mining companies as a director or incorporator. Companies included Filipinas Mining Corporation, Far East Oil Development Company, Land Surveys and Registration Inc, South Tayabas Oil Company, Inc, Mindanao Oil Company, Inc., Mineral and Commercial Development Company, O.R.O. Oil Company, South Cebu Oil Company, Inc., and the Sterling & Company, Inc.

In 1941, Luz's article If We Want to Avoid a Collapse was published in the 1940–1941 annual issue of The Commercial & Industrial Manual of the Philippines.

== Political career ==
=== Philippine Independence ===
In 1919, Luz as editor of El Ideal, was an attaché of the First Parliamentary Mission of the Independence Missions to the United States, serving as the representative of the press. The mission was led by Senate President Manuel Quezon, and received approval from U.S. President Woodrow Wilson. The missions wishes for independence were reiterated by Wilson to the U.S. Congress the following year but no action was taken. Luz continued to participate in Independence Missions joining in the Second Mission (1921–1922) and Sixth Mission (1927).

"America, with pride, can present to humanity a magnificent colonial handiwork, the product of America's unique colonial policy – a country inhabited by eleven million people who owe their economic progress to the political instrumentalities given them. For the greatest instrument of economic progress is poliotical autonomy – and this America has proven in her experiment in the Philippines"

— Arsenio N. Luz, Philippine Economic Development Under American Sovereignty

In April 1920, as manager of the Philippine Government Commercial Agency in New York, Luz published Philippine Economic Development Under American Sovereignty in the Bankers' Magazine Periodical Vol. 100 Iss. 4. His article was split into five sections and explained the Philippine Economy to an American business audience, the first section was on the limited American knowledge of the Philippines; the second was on how trade has increased; the third was on growth of the Philippine National Bank; the fourth was on the money circulation; and the final section was on and trade with other countries.

In 1931, Governor-General of the Philippines Dwight Davis appointed Luz commissioner general of the Philippine commission to the 1931 Paris Colonial Exposition. On July 18, 1931, the Philippine commission, along with prominent members of the Filipino community in Paris, held a banquet honouring the United States commission, the French exposition authorities, and "representatives of all countries participating in the exposition." The Philippine commission's farewell ceremony included a formal presentation of material to the Paris Permanent Colonial Museum (now known as the Cité nationale de l'histoire de l'immigration), and a luncheon held by the Philippine commission at the Restaurant Bagdad. In 1932, for his assistance at the Colonial Exposition and as representative of The Philippines, Luz was conferred the rank of officer in the French Legion of Honour, France's highest order of merit.

In 1933 Luz managed the first National Charity Sweepstakes with Jorge B. Vargas and Isaac Barza.

On August 3, 1934, Luz led a group of Filipino, and Filipino-American businessmen and politicians to retain free trade with the United States during and after the transition to Philippine independence. The group also sought to amend the Tydings-McDuffie Independence Act. Specifically, calling to replace the limitations act on Philippine imports in the United States, with more liberal economic provisions during the transition period. At the signing Luz asserted that the Philippines industry and trade were facing "tragedy and seemingly unavoidable disaster."

Arensio Luz is quoted to have said "Independence is dead" during a Rotary Club speech shortly before the independence debate that led to Philippine Independence restarted in the U.S. Congress.

=== Commonwealth of the Philippines ===
Luz served as an economic adviser at Malacañang throughout the Commonwealth period and took up several appointed positions. He was a member of the Commonwealth of the Philippines Inauguration Committee which organized the 1935 Inauguration of the Commonwealth of the Philippines, the committee was led by Senator Teofilo Sision. Luz was Chairman of the Subcommittee on the Press and served as a member on the Subcommittee Program and Ceremonies and Subcommittee on Inaugural Parade. In 1936, Luz was part of the Commonwealth Anniversary Committee led by Elpidio Quirino, celebrating the first anniversary of the Commonwealth of the Philippines. He also served President of the Chamber of Commerce of the Philippines, organizer of the Philippine-American Trade Association, .

On October 31, 1936, Luz and the other Boy Scouts of the Philippines (BSP) founders officially chartered the BSP in Commonwealth Act No. 111 authorized by President Manuel Quezon.

In 1939, Luz served as a member of the Board of Directors of the Manila Hotel Company.

=== Japanese occupation ===
During Japanese occupation of the Philippines, on December 4, 1942, Luz was made Secretary-Treasurer of KALIBAPI the sole political party during Japanese occupation. On May 4, 1942, Luz was appointed Director of the Philippine Red Cross for a one-year term.

U.S. Army Intelligence during the war wrote that on January 18, 1944, President Laurel established a Bureau of Information and appointed Luz as its head. A position with the rank and salary of a Minister of State. The Bureau was established to "sell the new Japanese-backed Republic to the Filipino people" through "controlling, directing, supervising and coordinating all information or publicity activities of the government." The Bureau would edit and publish the Official Gazette.

The U.S. Army wrote a brief profile on Luz explaining why Laurel chose him for the Bureau position.

Laurel picked a man who has a reputation for being a rather popular figure, particularly among businessman. Luz before the war served as head of the Philippine Carnival Association, was a high figure in Rotary circles, and in demand as a speaker. He is mostly Spanish, perhaps one-fourth Filipino. He was a neighbor and good friend of Laurel for a number of years. His principal role in the New Order before this has been as an Assistant Chairman of the Kalibapi.

=== Post World War II ===
On November 18, 1946, President Roxas appointed Luz to the newly formed the Surplus Property Commission. Tasked with handling the surplus property procured by Title 2 of the Philippine Rehabilitation act of 1946. Following Roxas' untimely death, President Quirino replaced Luz with the Hon. José Zulueta for the Surplus Property Commission.

In 1953, Luz was Director-General of the Philippines International Fair, Inc. and announced the Philippine Government's 1954 16-day national fair. As Director-General Luz managed the Philippines World Fair, the first World Fair to be held in the South Pacific. The fair featured Hawaiian showman E.K. Fernandez.

== Boy Scouts ==
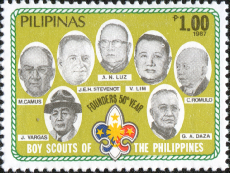
Luz (centre) Founders of the Boy Scouts of the Philippines. Stamp for National Boy Scout Movement 50th Anniversary, 28 Oct 1987.

In 1928, Luz registered to be a member of the Cebu Council, Boy Scouts of America. On October 31, 1936, Luz and the other Boy Scouts of the Philippines (BSP) founders officially chartered the BSP in Commonwealth Act No. 111 authorized by President Manuel Quezon. Later, he was appointed as Secretary of the Boy Scout Foundation by Joseph Stevenot and served in the BSP's National Executive Board.

== Personal life ==
On September 30, 1926, Luz married Carmen Albert, the eldest child of the then Head of Pediatrics at University of the Philippines Dr. José Albert.

== Awards and honours ==
France:

- Officer of the Legion of Honour.

== Legacy ==
Negros sugar planter Roman Lacson named his son Arsenio H. Lacson after Arsenio Luz, for his admiration of Luz as a journalist. Arsenio H. Lacson would go on to become the 15th Mayor of Manila and the first Manila mayor to be reelected to three terms.
