= Chamber of Commerce of the Philippine Islands =

Oldest business institution in the Philippines

- Tagalog trans.: Bulwagang Pangkalakal ng mga Lupaing Pilipinas
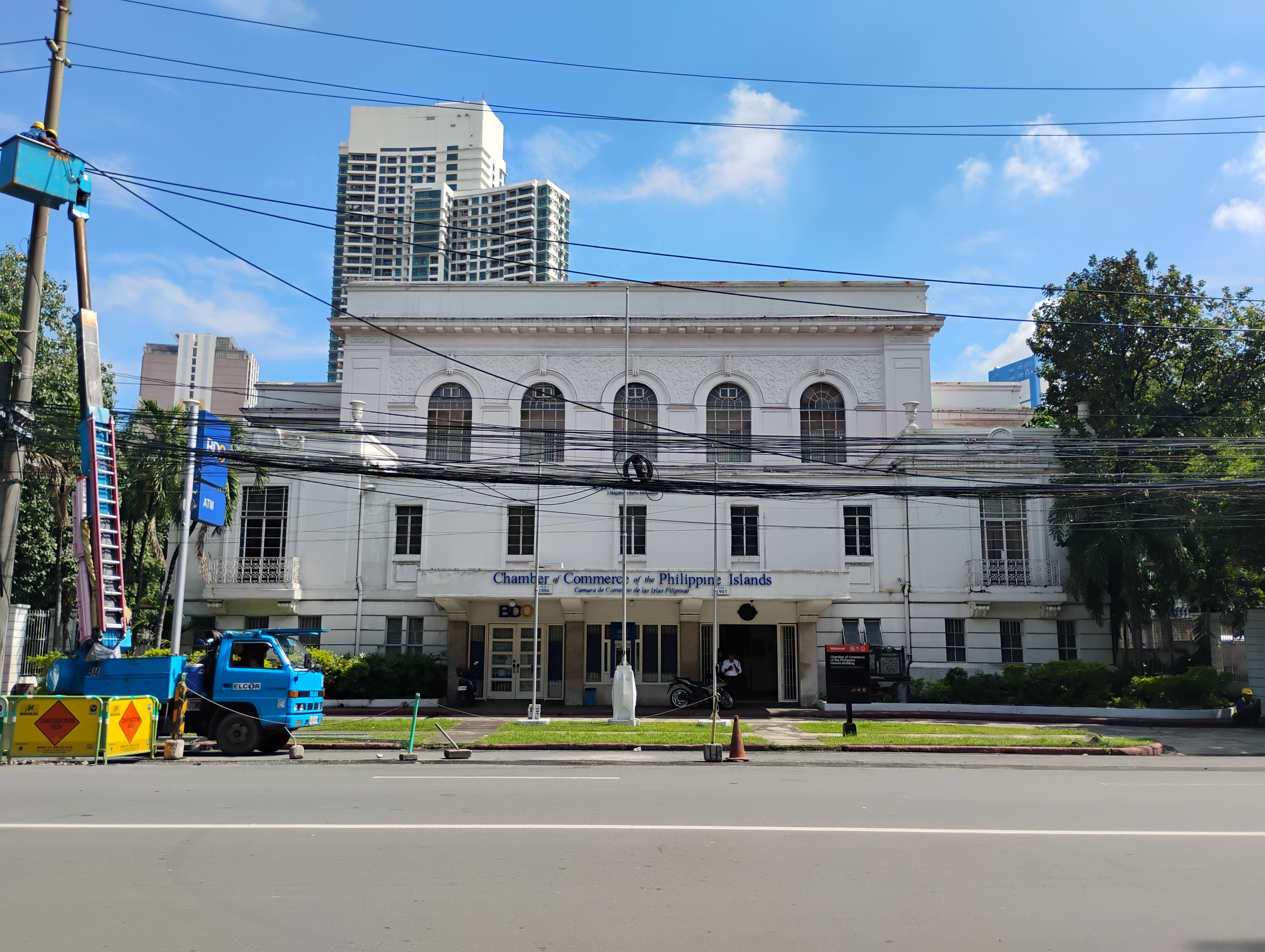
- Chamber Building
- Abbreviation: CCPI
- Nickname: The Chamber
- Formation: April 9, 1886; 140 years ago
- Founders: 1. D. Juan Rodríguez; 2. D. Miguel Velasco; 3. Sr. Rogaciano Rodríguez; 4. Sr. Francisco Reyes; 5. D. Ricardo Aguado; 6. Sr. Teodoro Yang-co; 7. Sr. Luis Hidalgo; 8. D. Pedro Roxas y Arroyo; 9. Sr. Rafael Reyes; 10. Sr. Tomás Sunico; 11. Sr. Vicente Somoza Cua-Peco; 12. Dr. Ariston Baustista; 13. Sr. Vicente D. Fernández; 14. Sr. Telésforo Chuy-dian; 15. Sr. Bernandino Hernández; 16. Sr. Faustino Lichauco; 17. Don Ramón Soriano; 18. Sr. Tomas Argüellles; 19. Sr. Ignacio Sy-yap; 20. Don Rafael del Pan
- Founded at: Manila
- Type: Non-profit
- Professional title: The Chamber of Commerce of the Philippine Islands
- Headquarters: The Chamber Building, Paseo de Magallanes 3, Intramuros, 1002 Manila, PH
- Location: Manila, Philippines
- Coordinates: 14°35′41″N 120°58′34″E
- Region served: National
- Official language: English (current); Spanish (historical)
- Owner: Chamber of Commerce of the Philippine Islands
- Main organ: COMMERCE Magazine
- Website: thechamber.ph
- Formerly called: La Cámara de Comercio de las Islas Filipinas

Chamber of Commerce of the Philippine Islands headquarters
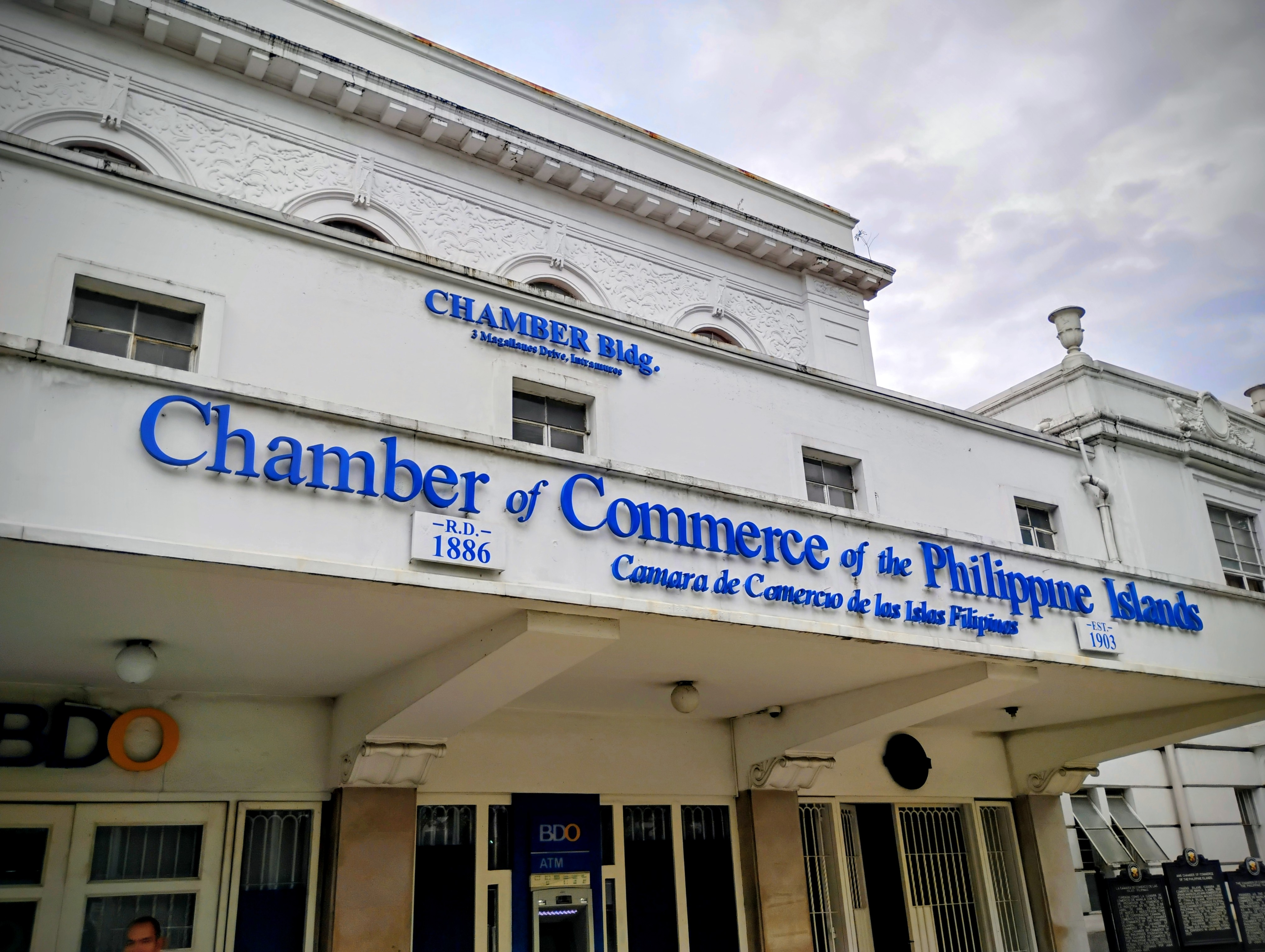
- The Chamber Bldg., façade

General information
- Location: Manila, Philippines, No. 3 Magallanes Drive, Intramuros, Brgy U 56 Zone 49
- Coordinates: 14.5944887°N 120.9761999°E
- Inaugurated: 1937

Design and construction
- Architect: Juan Arellano

Magallanes Drive

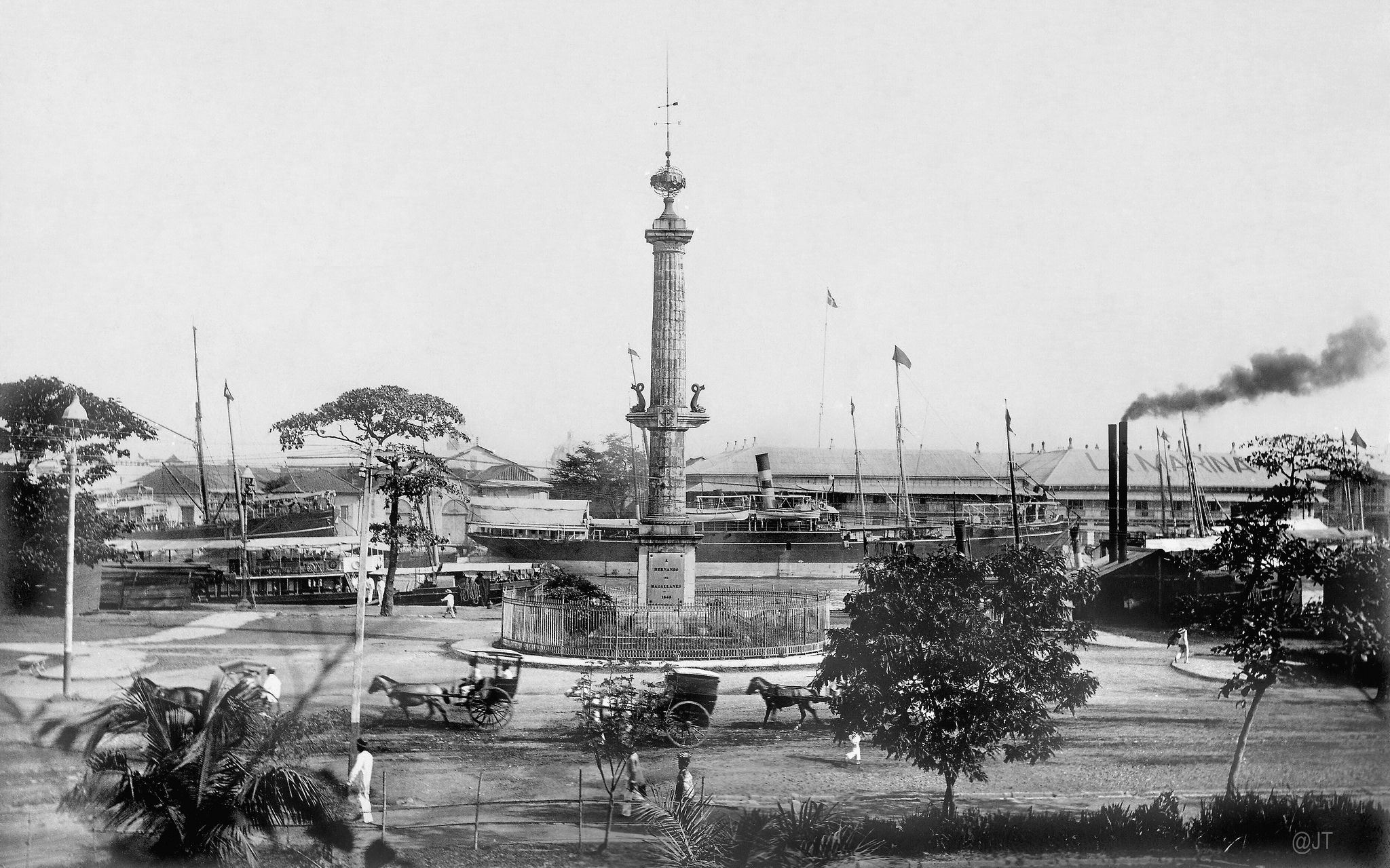
- Interactive map of Magallanes Drive
- Former name: Paseo de Magallanes
- Namesake: Fernando Magallanes
- Maintained by: Intramuros Administration
- Length: 0.632 km (0.393 mi)
- Location: Intramuros, Manila
- East end: N150 (Liwasang Bonifacio)
- West end: N1 (Plaza Mexico (Manila) towards Bonifacio Drive)

The Chamber of Commerce of the Philippine Islands, originally known as La Cámara de Comercio de las Islas Filipinas is the provenance and oldest business institution in the Philippines, founded in 1886.

The Chamber of Commerce of the Philippine Islands (CCPI) has its origins in the Spanish period from a Royal decree by the king of Spain, Alfonso XII through the Queen Regent Maria Christina when "Cámara" institutions were throughout the Spanish colonies; and the Camara was established by this decree on April 9, 1886. On June 17, 1887, its statutes and bylaws were initially approved by the Gobierno Superior of the Philippines, and finally approved by the Queen Regent Maria Cristina on February 9, 1888. Henceforth the Cámara de Comercio de las Islas Filipinas held its first General Assembly and elected the following officers on May 24, 1887.

President:	D. Joaquín María Elizalde
Vice President:	D. Gonzalo Tuason
Sentador (Secretary):	D. Manuel Franco
Treasurer:	D. José María Echeita
Secretary General:	D. Joaquín Santamarina

Sr. Don Francisco Godínez succeeded the founding president Sr. Don Joaquín María Elizalde in 1890, followed by Sr. Don José de Echeita in 1895. After the Spanish–American War in 1898, as conflicts subsided, on July 19, 1903, the Camara de Comercio de Manila held a session wherein Sr. Luis Hidalgo, Sr. Teodoro Yangco, Sr. Vicente Somoza and Sr. Faustino Lichauco called forth a meeting to create a Filipino Chamber of Commerce and thus, Cámara de Comercio Filipina was born. In the said meeting, Don Francisco Reyes was elected as the President.

The "Cámara de Comercio Filipina" held its first session and elected Governor General William Howard Taft as the Honorary President. The Chamber ushered advocacies, programs and projects from its founding in 1886, towards edifying the Philippines as "Pearl of the Orient", a description coined by the Spanish Jesuit historian Juan Delgado in 1751 and phrased by José Rizal in his final poem, "Mi Último Adiós" for its culture and historical significance.

== In the New Millenium ==
Martial Law imperatives made the Chamber take a backseat from 1977 until 2014, the year when the National Historical Commission of the Philippines, recognizing its status, bestowed Markers upon the chamber in 3 languages: Spanish, English, and Filipino – the languages that span the Chamber's existence; thus the Chamber rekindled itself as the "Provenance Chamber of History" with the theme, "History Builds the Future."; and in 2021 the Chamber adopted a continuing guide themed "Navigating the Future as its Work Program advocacy for the coming years."

== Chamber Presidents ==
A chronological listing of the Chamber's presidents and their terms:

CHAMBER PRESIDENTS
Term	1886	1890	1896	1903–1904	1904	1905
Pres.	Joaquin Marcelino de Elizalde	Francisco Godínez	José María de Echeita	Francisco Z. Reyes	Teodoro Yangco	Rafael del Pan
Term	1906–1912	1912–1915	1915–1916	1916–1917	1917–1918	1918–1919
Pres.	Vicente D. Fernandez	Rafael Reyes	Teodoro Yangco	Mauro Prieto	Jose F. Fernandez	Ramon J. Fernandez
Term	1919–1920	1920–1921	1921–1922	1922–1923	1923–1924	1924–1925
Pres.	Vicente Madrigal	Juan B. Alegre	Jose V. Ramirez	Alfonso M. Tiaoqui	Teodoro Yangco	Leon Miguel Heras
Term	1925–1926	1926–1927	1927–1928	1928–1929	1930–1931	1931–1932
Pres.	Vicente G. Genato	Manuel E. Cuyugan	Vicente T. Fernandez	Pio V. Corpus	Leopoldo R. Aguinaldo	Isaac Barza
Term	1932–1933	1933–1934	1934–1935	1935–1936	1936–1941	1941
Pres.	Gonzalo Puyat	Arsenio N. Luz	Eulogio Rodriguez	Leopoldo R. Aguinaldo	Vicente Madrigal	Aurelio Pedro Periquet y Ziálcita
Term	1941–1945	1945–1949	1951	1951–1954	1954–1955	1955–1957
Pres.	Vicente Madrigal	Gil J. Puyat	Aurelio Pedro Periquet y Ziálcita / Daniel R. Aguinaldo	Antonio de las Alas	Teofilo D. Reyes Sr.	Cesar M. Lorenzo
Term	1957	1957–1958	1958–1960	1960–1961	1961–1962	1962–1963
Pres.	Bienvenido R. Medrano	Primitivo Lovina	Marcelo S. Balatbat	Gaudencio E. Antonino	Alfonso Calalang	Hermenegildo R. Reyes Sr.
Term	1963–1964	1964–1965	1965–1966	1966–1967	1967–1968	1968–1969
Pres.	Domingo Arcega	Demetrio Muñoz	Aurelio Periquet Jr.	Pio Pedrosa	Teofilo Reyes Jr.	Teofisto Guingona Jr.
Term	1969–1970	1970–1971	1971–1972	1972–1973	1973–1974	1975–1978
Pres.	Rogelio W. Manalo	Simeon C. Medalla	Miguel S. Arámbulo Jr.	Wigberto P. Clavesilla	Dominador Lim	Fred J. Elizalde
Term	1983	1984	1985–1992	1992–1993	1993–1996	1996–2000
Pres.	Perfecto Mañalac	Paulino S. Dionisio Jr.	Vicente Angliongto	José Barredo	Lourdes L. Sanvictores	Exequiel B. Garcia
Term	2000–2003	2003–2006	2006–2009	2009–2010	2010–2025	
Pres.	Rose D. Teodoro	Francis C. Chua	Melito S. Salazar Jr.	Benigno N. Ricafort	Jose Luis U. Yulo Jr.	

== The Founders ==
Among the founders of the Chamber were representatives of the cross-section of the economy. They were: Don Juan Rodriguez, shipbuilder; Don Miguel Velasco, real estate owner; Sr. Rogaciano Rodriguez, businessman; Sr. Francisco Reyes, banker, who was the first president from 1903 to 1904; Don Ricardo Aguado, businessman; Sr. Teodoro Yang-co, real estate owner; Sr. Luis Hidalgo, businessman; Don Pedro A. Roxas, real estate owner and businessman; Sr. Rafael Reyes, real estate owner and industrialist; Sr. Tomás Sunico, industrialist; Sr. Vicente Somoza Cua-Peco, real estate owner and businessman; Dr. Aristón Baustista, industrialist; Don Vicente D. Fernández, attorney-in-fact of Don Pedro P. Roxas; Sr. Telésforo Chuy-dian, real estate owner and businessman; Don Bernandino Hernandez, businessman; Sr. Faustino Lichauco, real estate owner and importer; Don Ramón Soriano, real estate owner and importer; Sr. Tomas Argüellles, architect; Sr. Ignacio Sy-yap, businessman; and Don Rafael del Pan, lawyer.

== First Meeting ==
The first organizational meeting of the founders was held at the residence of Don Juan Rodriguez on Calle Vives in Manila's San Nicolas district. It was presided by Don Miguel Velasco. In this meeting, the group adopted "Cámara de Comercio de Manila" as the name of the organization. It was later changed in 1919 to "Chamber of Commerce of the Philippine Islands / Camara de Comercio de las Islas Filipinas".

== American Period (1903-1946) ==
The change of sovereignty in the country from Spanish to American changed the tenor of business in the islands. Vicente Madrigal, Juan B. Alegre, Jose V. Ramirez, Alfonso M. Tiaoqui, Vicente P. Genato, Manuel E. Cuyugan, Vicente T. Fernandez and other prominent members of the Camara proved themselves leaders in espousing improved business relations in the Philippines.

On May 3, 1915, the members of the Camara de Comercio Filipinas amended their by-laws, and on June 19, 1915, its Escritura Social was ratified.

By 1919, English began to be used instead of Spanish, thereby the Cámara was also officially referred to in documents as the Chamber of Commerce of the Philippine Islands. On July 17, 1933, During the 3rd session of the 9th Philippine Legislature, the Secretary of Agriculture and Commerce was authorized to sell to the Chamber a land for its building and approved therein on December 6, 1933. On September 15, 1934, The Chamber was issued title to its own land, and through the contributions of private businesses, the Chamber's 3-storey building, designed by the architect Juan Arellano, was built and inaugurated in 1937 with Philippine President Manuel Quezon officiating with then-President Aurelio P. Periquet y Ziálcita.

After the end of World War II, upon the attainment of Philippine independence, on April 6, 1949, the Securities and Exchange Commission of the Department of Commerce and Industry issued a Reconstruction of Records of the Chamber of some lost documents where the Chamber was named as Cámara de Comercio de las Islas Filipinas (and henceforth, Chamber of Commerce of the Philippine Islands).

== Official Publication ==
=== The Early COMMERCE Years ===
Before the Chamber's founding, the necessity for unilaterally voicing the interests of the business community in the Philippines was a dismissive concept. However, manifold concerns confronting the conduct of business emboldened the Chamber towards issues essential to the material progress of the country.

The Chamber's official publication, named the "Revista de la Cámara de Comercio de las Islas Filipinas" released its maiden issue in 1927, subsidized by Leopoldo R. Aguinaldo (who became a Chamber president), and who later renamed the magazine's name to "COMMERCE". The change in name was made to identify it as the official organ of the Chamber.

COMMERCE Magazine had two sections for English and Spanish readerships, but was later reformatted into a wholly English language publication. It was printed in a deluxe format, on heavy paper, which made it the most expensive, authoritative and exclusive trade publication in the Philippines. In January 1952, Dr. Jose R. Katigbak was appointed to manage the magazine, assisted by M.M. de los Reyes. The Board of Editors headed by Dr. Katigbak included Domingo Abadilla and Hilarion Vibal as staff, followed by other prominent members of the Chamber who took turns in running the publication, such as Teofilo Reyes, Hilarion Vibal, Benito Medina, Carlos de Lara and George Yulo.

=== The Later COMMERCE Years ===
The publication of COMMERCE was halted during the Philippine Martial Law regime. In 2015, José Luis U. Yulo Jr. (56th President of the Chamber) and Denissa G. Venturanza (executive director) decided to revive the publication. Currently, COMMERCE Magazine (Philippines) is issued regularly on a quarterly basis.

== Gallery ==
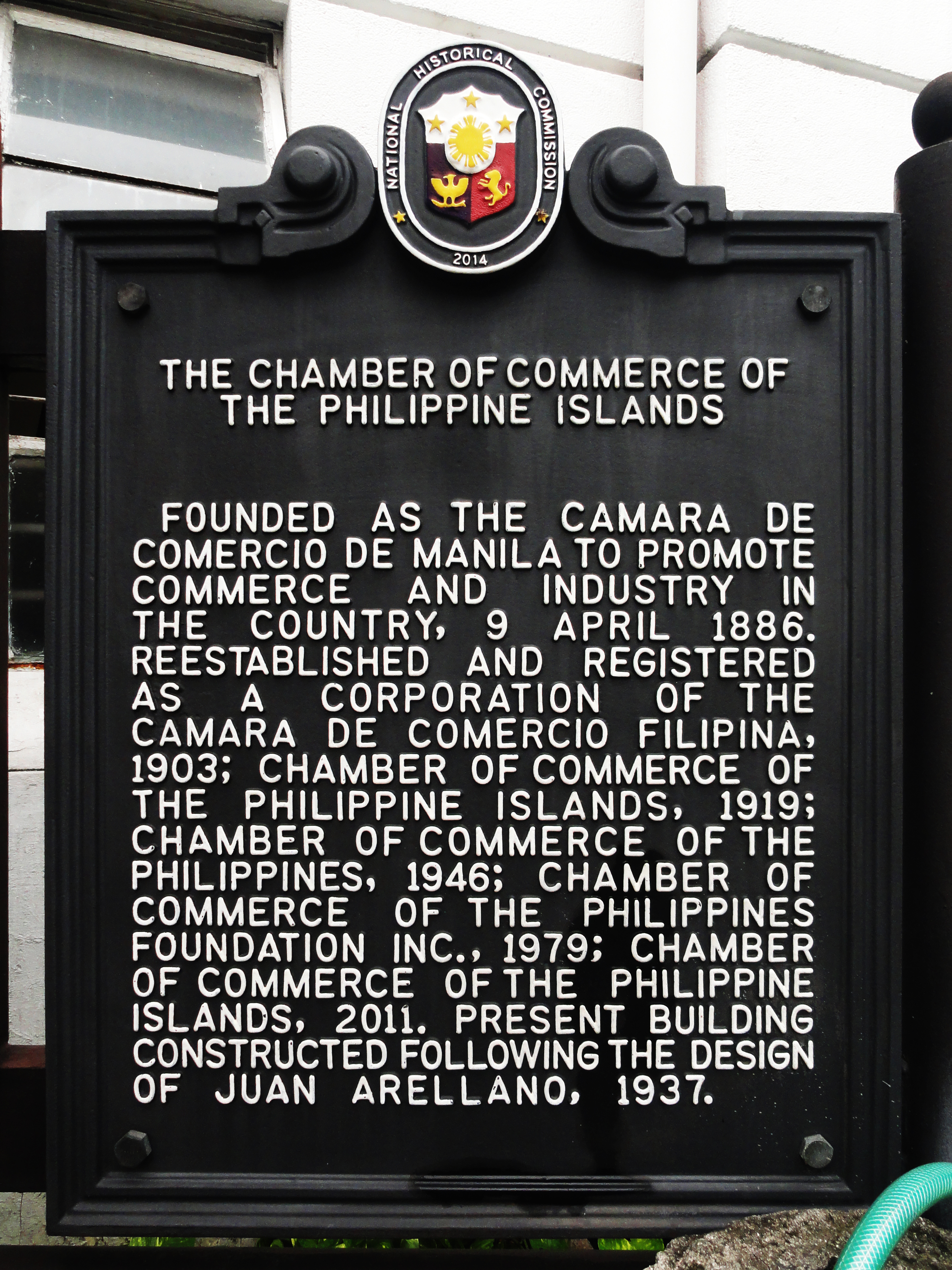
The Chamber of Commerce of the Philippine Islands Historical Marker (English)

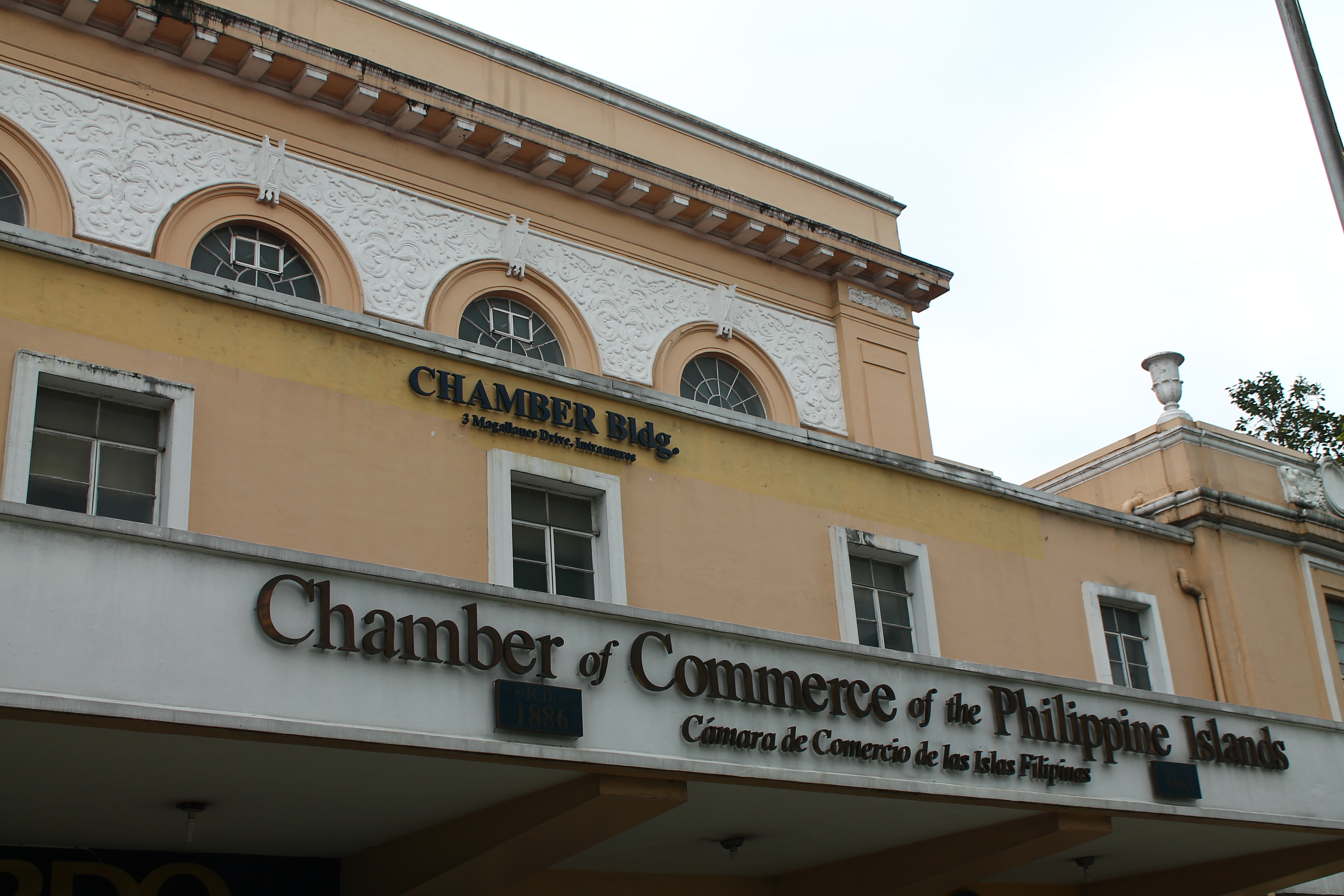
Chamber of Commerce of the Philippine Islands, Intramuros

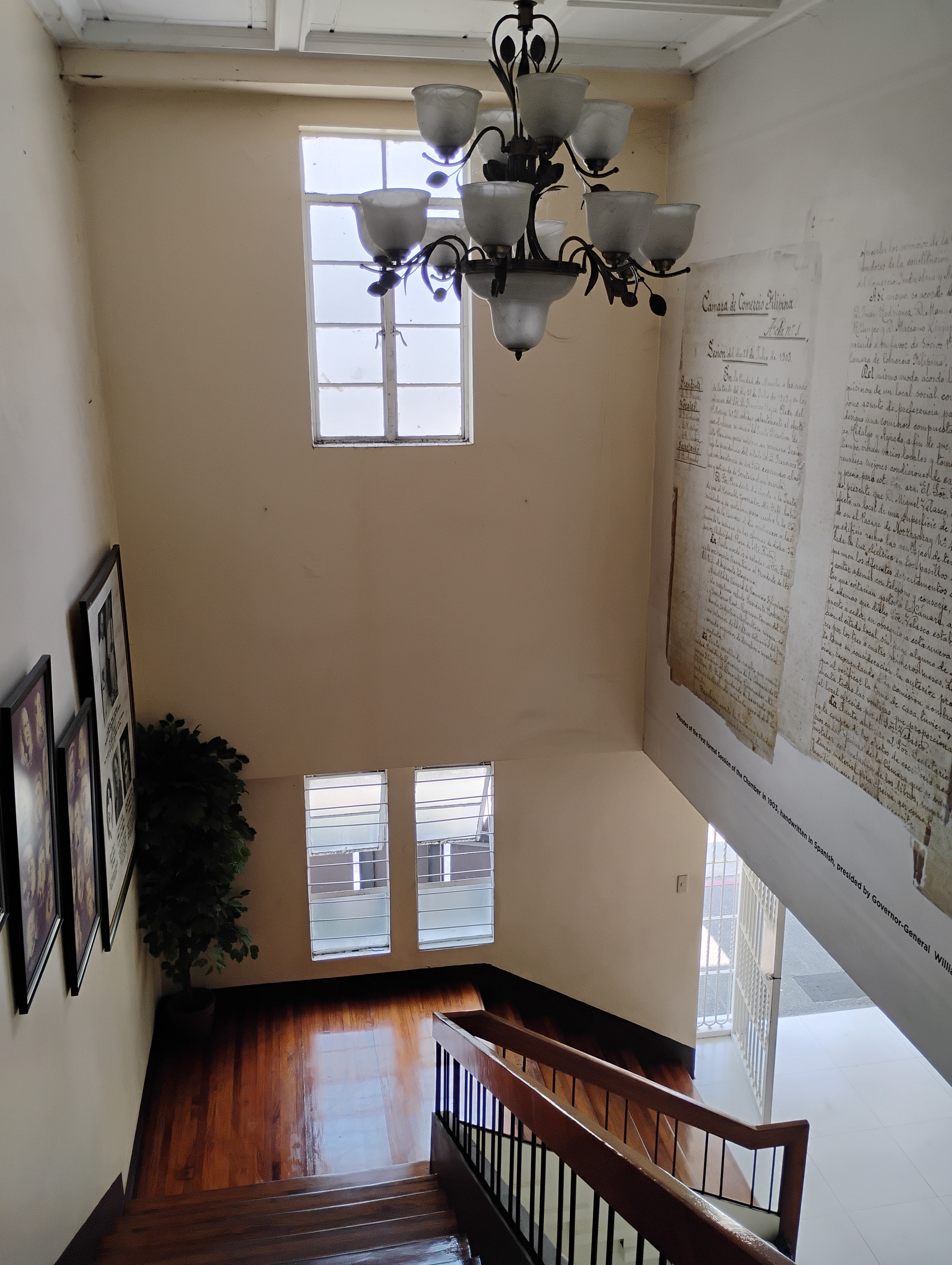
Interior of Chamber Building

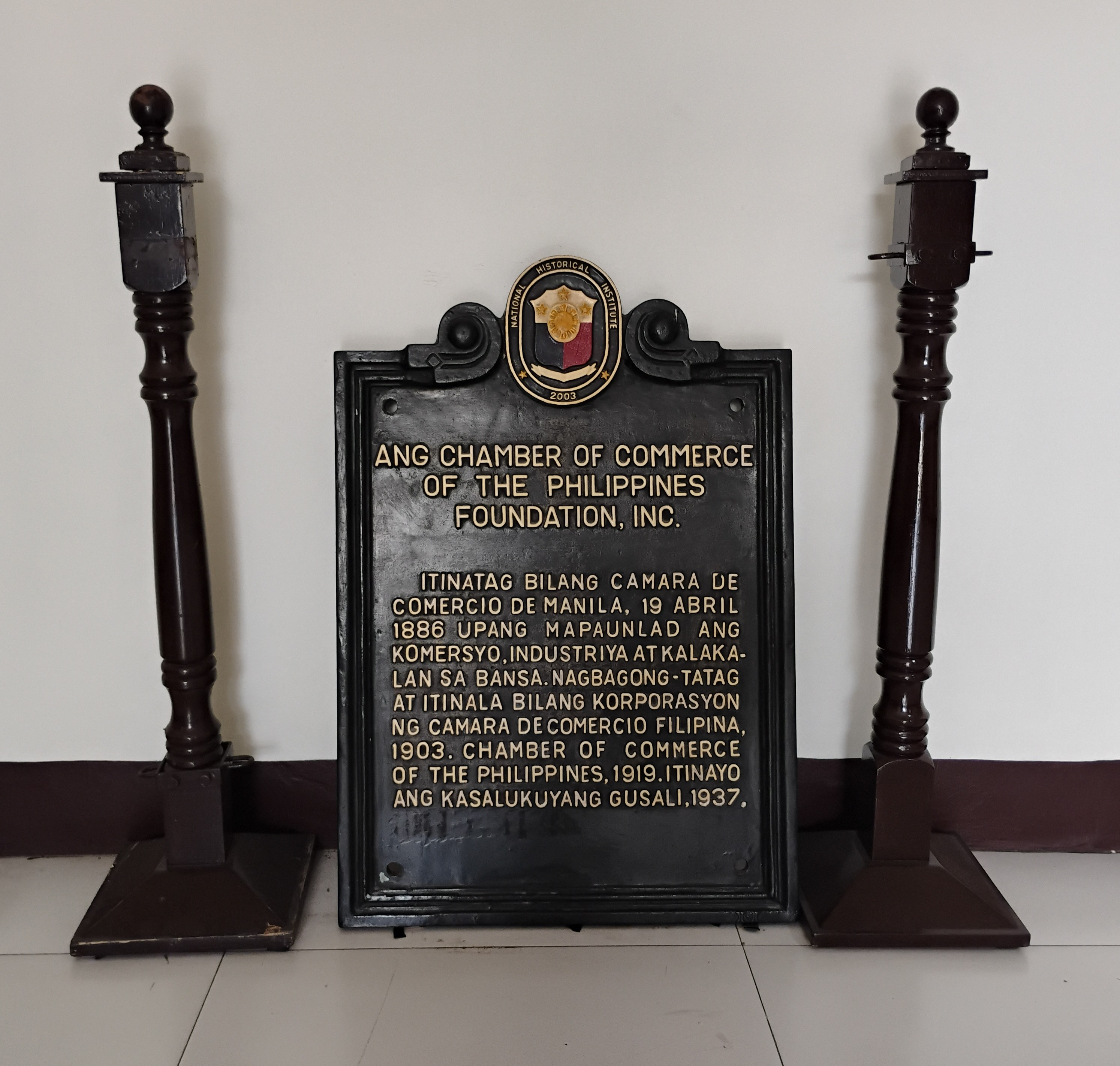
Ang Chamber of Commerce of the Philippines Foundation, Inc. Historical Marker
