= Juan B. Alegre =

Senator of the 6th and 7th Philippine Legislatures

The Honourable Juan Bautista Alegre y Levantino
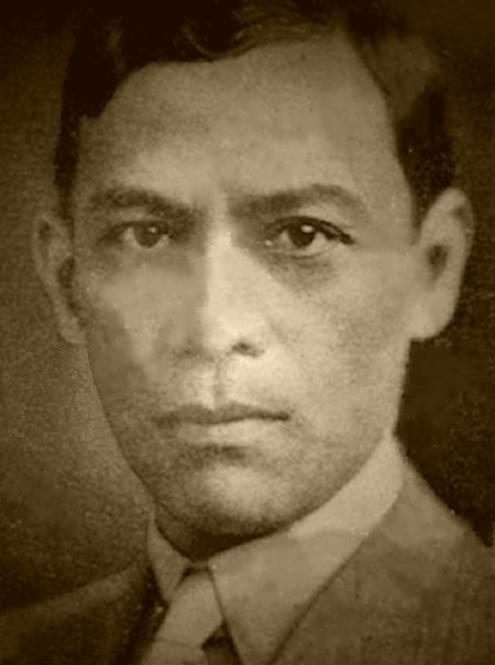

Senator of the Philippines from the 6th District
- In office June 2, 1931 – June 14, 1931
- Preceded by: José O. Vera
- Succeeded by: José O. Vera
- In office June 6, 1922 – June 5, 1928
- Preceded by: Leoncio Imperial
- Succeeded by: José Fuentebella

President of the Chamber of Commerce of the Philippine Islands
- In office 1920–1921
- Preceded by: Vicente Madrigal
- Succeeded by: Jose V. Ramirez

Personal details
- Born: Juan Bautista Alegre y Levantino; February 2, 1882 Casiguran, Sorsogon, Captaincy General of the Philippines
- Died: June 14, 1931 (aged 49) Manila, Philippine Islands
- Cause of death: complications of gastric ulcer
- Resting place: La Loma Cemetery
- Party: Democrata (1931)
- Other political affiliations: Nacionalista (1922-1931)
- Spouse: Amanda ("Aimee") Sargent
- Children: (1) Narciso (died in infancy; 3 months); (2) Narciso Joseph; (3) Anita (died in childhood); (4) Juan Bautista, Jr.; (5) Maria Cristina; (6) José
- Relatives: Narciso Alegre y Pellicer (father); Ramona Levantino (mother)
- Education: Yale Law School

Juan Bautista Alegre y Levantino (February 2, 1882 – June 14, 1931) was a Filipino statesman, a delegate of the first Philippine Independence Mission of 1919 to Washington, D.C., Secretary of the National Committee of the Philippine Independence Commission of 1922, a member of the first Philippine Independence Congress of 1930, and Senator of the Philippines.

== Biography ==
Juan B. Alegre was born on February 2, 1882, in Casiguran in the province of Sorsogon in the Bicol Peninsula. In 1926, he later moved residence to what is now known as Barangay San Juan in Irosin.

Alegre was an abaca plantation owner and reportedly one of the wealthiest citizens of the Philippines of his time. He was the president of the Chamber of Commerce of the Philippine Islands from 1920 to 1921, and one of the financiers of the Philippines Herald newspaper. Juan B. Alegre was married to Amanda Sargent and survived by four of his children.

After completing his training in the Philippines, Juan B. Alegre attended Yale University from 1903 to 1905 but had to leave his 3Ls in Yale Law School, abetted by business concerns from the death of his father, Narciso Alegre Pellicer.

In 1922, he was elected to the Senate of the Philippines for the Sixth Senatorial District on behalf of the Nacionalista Party. Three years later, Alegre was re-elected to the 7th Philippine Legislature. However, after being defeated for a third term in the 1928 Senate elections by another member of the Nacionalista Party, he joined the Democrata Party.

On behalf of the Demócratas, he succeeded afterwards in being re-elected again to the Senate. But before Alegre could take his place in the 9th Philippine Legislature, however, he died in his home in Manila after being sworn to office at the age of 49, on June 14, 1931 from complications of gastric ulcer. His vacancy was filled by Jose O. Vera by a special election later that year. A street fronting the Sorsogon Provincial Capitol and Park in Sorsogon City is named in his honor.

== Images ==
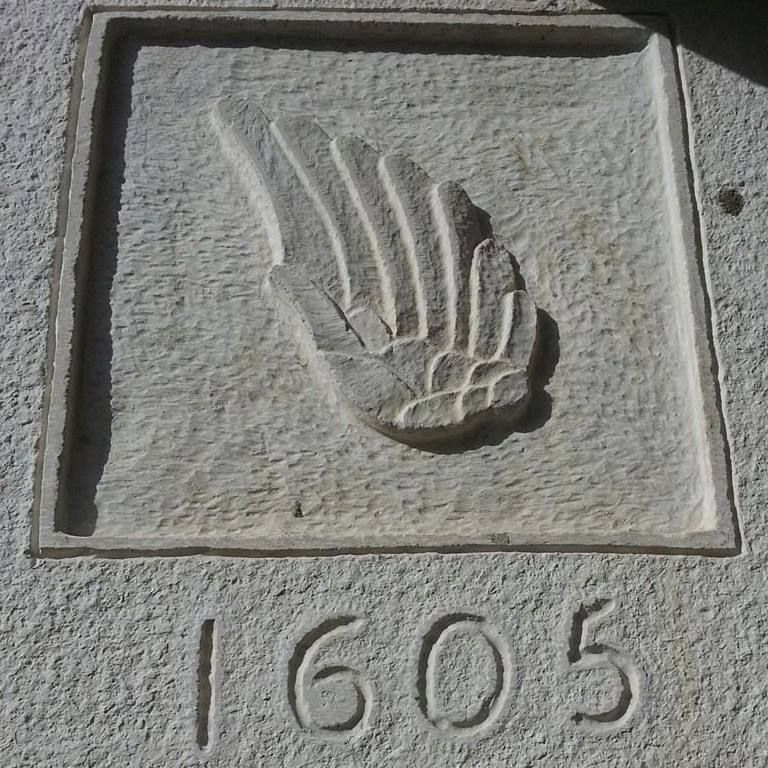
Historical emblem of the Alegre family of Villarroya de los Pinares

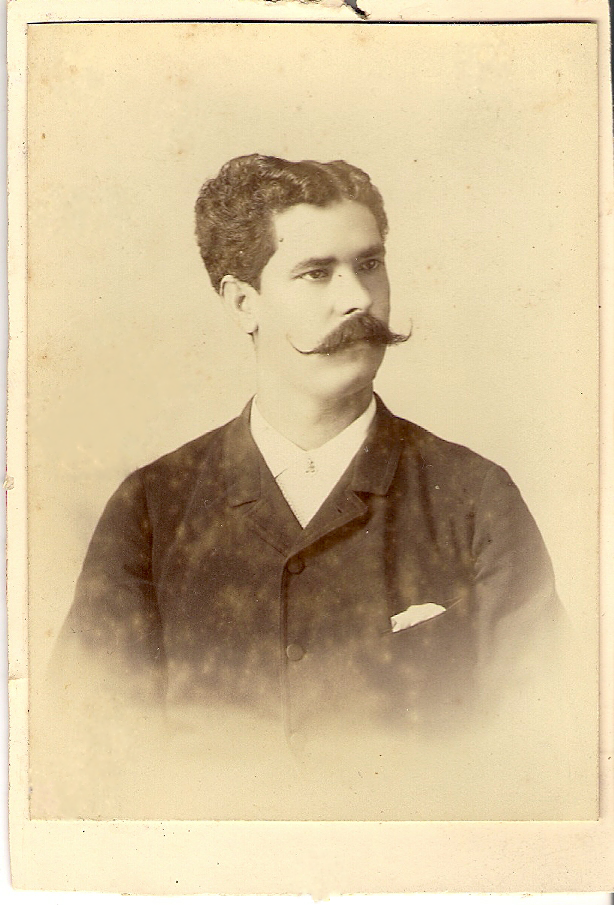
Narciso Alegre Pellicer, father of Juan Bautista Alegre y Levantino

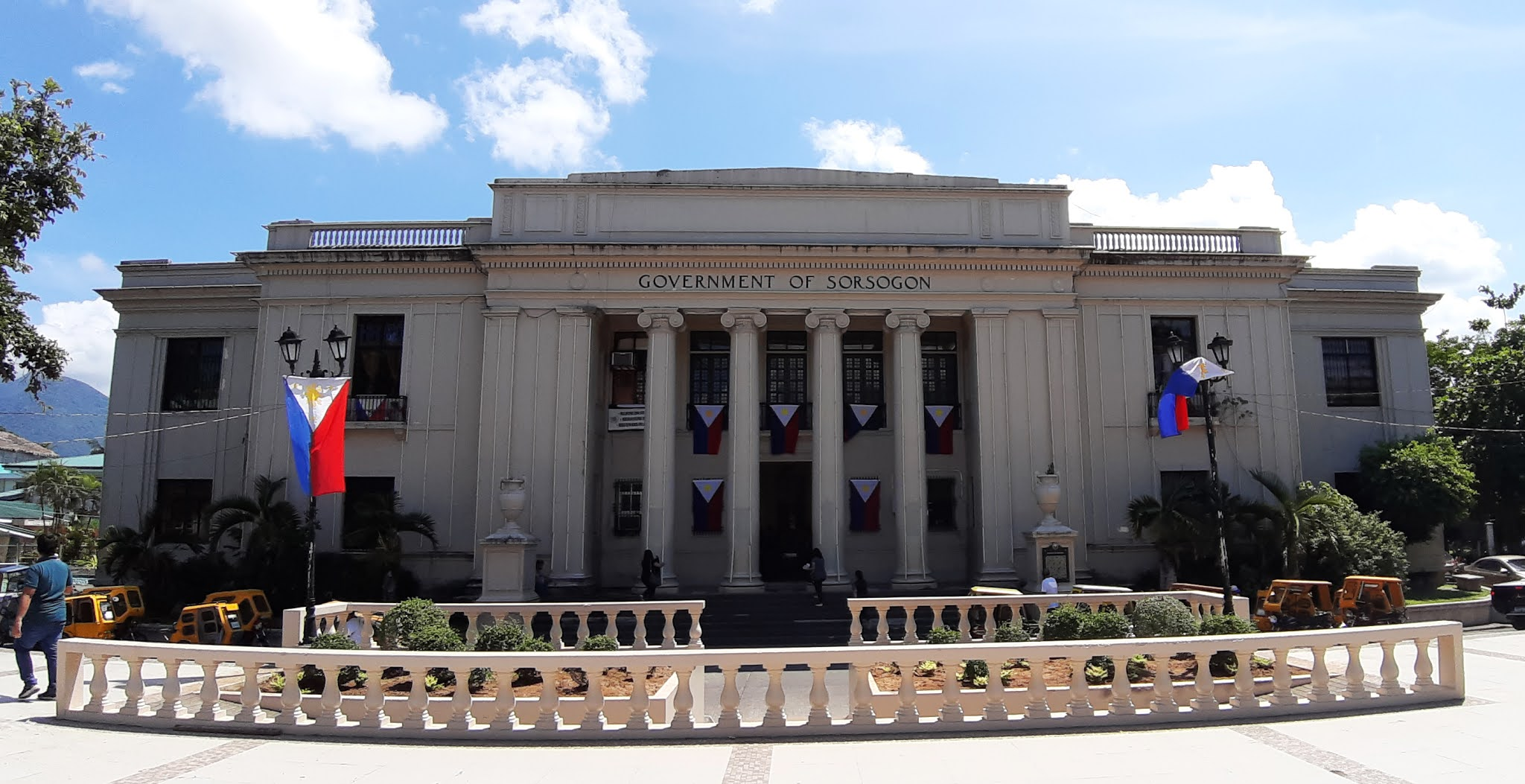
The Sorsogon Provincial Capitol and Park, bounded by Juan Alegre Street

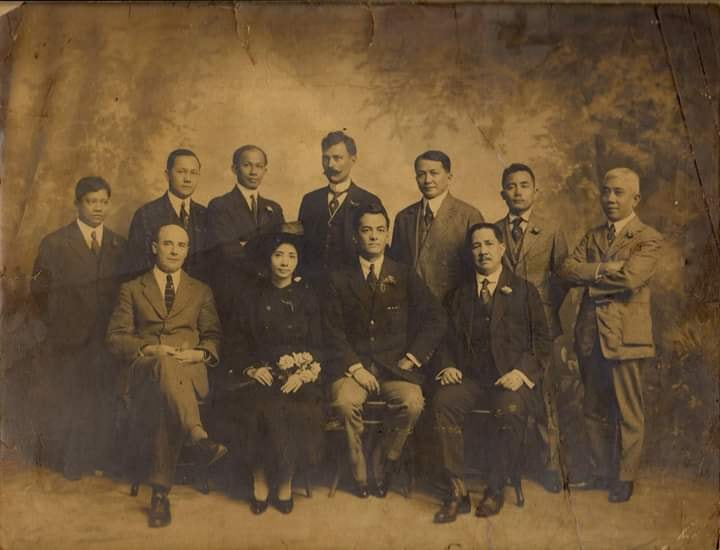
Wedding party of Manuel Luis Quezon and Aurora Aragon after the marriage was solemnized in Hongkong on December 14, 1918.

== See also ==
- List of Philippine legislators who died in office
