= Vicente Madrigal =

Spanish Filipino businessman, industrialist and politician

The Honorable Vicente Madrigal
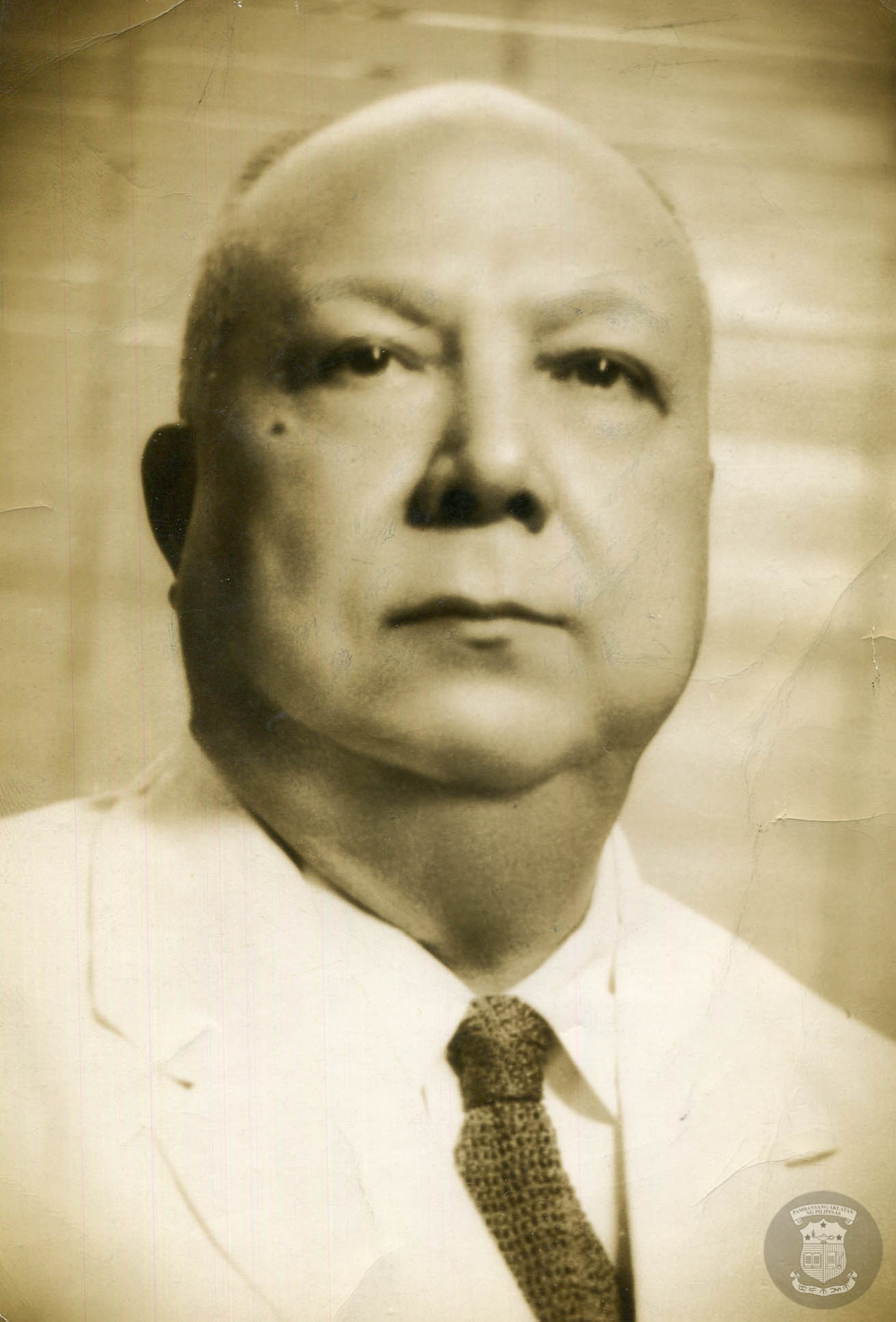

Senator of the Philippines
- In office July 9, 1945 – December 30, 1953

President of the Chamber of Commerce of the Philippine Islands
- In office 1941–1945
- Preceded by: Aurelio Pedro Periquet y Ziálcita
- Succeeded by: Gil Puyat
- In office 1936–1941
- Preceded by: Leopoldo R. Aguinaldo
- Succeeded by: Aurelio Pedro Periquet y Ziálcita
- In office 1919–1920
- Preceded by: Ramon J. Fernandez
- Succeeded by: Juan B. Alegre

Personal details
- Born: Vicente María Epifanio López Madrigal; April 5, 1880 Ligao, Albay, Captaincy General of the Philippines
- Died: June 6, 1972 (aged 92) New Manila, Quezon City, Philippines
- Party: Liberal (1947–1972)
- Other political affiliations: Nacionalista (1941–1947)
- Spouse: Susana de Ramos Paterno Madrigal
- Relations: Jamby Madrigal (granddaughter); Francisco Bayot Jr. (grandson)
- Children: Macaria, Paz, Josefina, Antonio, Jose, Consuelo and Maria Luisa
- Education: Colegio de San Juan de Letran
- Occupation: Businessman, Senator

Vicente María Epifanio López Madrigal (April 5, 1880 – June 6, 1972) was a Spanish Filipino businessman, industrialist and politician. Madrigal died at home in New Manila, Quezon City, under the care of his youngest daughter, Maria Luisa.

== Early life ==
Born in 1880, Vicente Madrigal grew up in Ligao, Albay. He was the only son of José María Madrigal, who emigrated from Barcelona, Spain, a Catalan migrant and former soldier, and Macaria López (Pardo de Tavera), a Castilian mestiza. Macaria was one of two natural daughters of Joaquín Pardo de Tavera who lived in Albay as a bachelor prior to his marriage to Gertrudis Gorricho, a wealthy heiress. As illegitimate children, she and her sister could not carry the Pardo de Tavera surname; thus, in surviving records she used the name Macaria Lopez y Noreña.

Growing up in meager circumstances in remote provinces, he dreamt of owning his own shipping fleet. When the monsoon rains came, he created paper boats. His mother, nicknamed Nena, teased him that his paper boats would not take him too far away and his reply was always that one day he would take his mom and dad away on his real ship across the seas to visit Spain, his father's dying wish.

He studied at Colegio de San Juan de Letran, a Manila college known for its roster of half-Spanish Filipinos and for its location in the walled city of Intramuros, once the regional bastion of Spanish power. With his father depending on a small pension, the family exploited its military connections with the Escuela Nautica who were close with the friars who owned San Juan de Letran. He graduated with the highest honors. His closest college classmates were future Presidents Manuel Luis Quezon y Molina and Sergio Osmeña, who were themselves poor relatives of rich families.

While in Manila, he came face-to-face with the staggering wealth of his maternal grandfather's family, that of Joaquin Pardo de Tavera and the Gorricho real estate portfolio spanning the Escolta and the ancestral house of the Gorricho-Pardo de Tavera. He was determined to match or even surpass the huge wealth of his Manila relatives, who did not recognize that he, his mother and his aunt existed.

== Business career ==
Madrigal established large businesses in coal, oil, sugar, cement, shipping and real estate.

In the shipping business, his Madrigal Steamship Company did not begin to return profits until after his mother's death, frustrating his childhood dream of bringing his parents to Spain. He settled for treating his sister Rosario to an extended vacation aboard a Madrigal ship to Barcelona.

In the cement business, he acquired Rizal Cement Corporation from Ynchausti y Compañía.

In the coal business, Madrigal was criticized by contemporaries and modern commentators for having engaged in war profiteering, supplying coal to the Japanese navy during its occupation of the Philippines between 1942 and 1945. It appears that he did so under duress, as he was known to be patriotic and the approximately one million pesos he made in profit was a far smaller amount than he would have made by closing operations during the war. Madrigal attributed this situation to the loss of the good luck that his wife Susana brought to his life, for she died a few months before the war began and left him a widower raising five girls and two boys.

Madrigal was named as President of the Chamber of Commerce of the Philippine Islands thrice, from 1919 to 1920, from 1936 to 1941, and from 1941 to 1945.

Madrigal was a close friend of Manuel L. Quezon, Commonwealth President of the country and a former classmate. He used this connection to acquire certificates to refineries from bankrupt Spanish-Filipino families, whose business had been devastated by the transfer of the Philippines from Spanish to American control. This allowed Madrigal to expand into the commodities market, selling sugar and palm oil, as well as claiming real estate, which he primarily disposed of to increase his shares in growing companies. The remainder he gave to his wife, who managed the properties successfully.

== Marriage and family ==
He married Susana Paterno y Ramos, who grew up in Pangil, Laguna and was a poor relation to her own Manila relatives, the Paternos of Quiapo and Santa Cruz, Manila.

She was a dressmaker to the prominent Cuyugan and Catigbac families, established a jewelry shop with the Salgado family of Pampanga, and dabbled in real estate. Before the war she acquired an 11,000 hectares (27,000 acres) hacienda in Canlubang, Laguna. She was responsible for the purchase of the Madrigal property where the old Jai Alai fronton used to stand, as well as buildings near her aunts' mansions on Calle Hidalgo, Quiapo, Manila and its adjacent streets. She urged her husband to invest in Hacienda de Mandaluyong even when her husband did not agree to be a major investor without control of the partnership built by Francisco Ortigas Jr. Susana foresaw that upon her husband's eventual divestment, the Ortigas clan would have to surrender large chunks of their property in payment. That property became what is now known as Corinthian Gardens and Arcadia Village in Pasig where even a small lot commands millions today. She obtained lots in Wack-Wack Golf Club which eventually devolved to her daughter Josefina. Further, she recognized the possibilities of Alabang, Muntinlupa. Susana Heights, an almost 400-hectare lot originally, devolved to her daughter Maria Luisa's side. Today, Ayala Alabang's mango trees are her visible legacies in the mini-city, which features schools, Madrigal Business Park, and even a Polo field named after the family.

Her descendants receive rents from the centrally located commercial real estate properties she acquired. In contrast, Vicente preferred non-real estate investments. He was frightened at how agricultural holdings like haciendas owned by great Spanish families in the Philippines remained idle, or worse, were confiscated or expropriated ad absentia by the government or unscrupulous encargados.

Upon the deaths of her Paterno aunts, she and her brothers Simon and Jose inherited the old, beautiful Paterno mansions.

Their children were Macaria "Nena" (de Leon) named after Vicente's mother, Paz "Pacita" (Warns, later Gonzalez) who served as senator from 1955 until 1961, Josefina "Pinang" named after Vicente's father Jose Maria (Bayot), Antonio "Tony" and Jose (named after Susana's father Jose Tereso Paterno y Zamora), married to sisters Amanda Abad Santos and Victoria Abad Santos, respectively, Consuelo Alejandra "Chito" (Vazquez later Collantes) and Maria Luisa "Ising" (Vazquez, his brother's marriage to Consuelo Alejandra having been annulled). Madrigal's wealth was equally divided among his seven offspring.

He is the grandfather of former Senator Jamby Madrigal, the daughter of Antonio Madrigal.

== Illegitimacy scandal ==
As Madrigal rose in wealth, the opposite happened to the Pardo de Tavera family. After the flamboyant Crystal Arcade venture of Andres Luna de San Pedro (son of Juan Luna and Paz Pardo de Tavera), one of the heirs and grandnephews of his grandfather Joaquin, the Pardo de Tavera holding firm could no longer service its mounting debts. In a desperate move, Madrigal was named as respondent by Pardo de Tavera, seeking to nullify the Motion to Foreclose by its creditor El Hogar Filipino, on the basis that he signed some of the papers involved in the loan. Madrigal did not know that money he loaned to El Hogar Filipino was used by the firm to facilitate a loan to the Pardo de Tavera family, and neither did El Hogar Filipino know that Madrigal and the Pardo de Taveras were related by blood illegitimately. This caused a scandal among business circles at that time, although, in deference to other involved families including the Legarda and Roces clans, no specific accounts were published in the leading newspapers. This is also the reason why afterwards Madrigal distanced himself from El Hogar Filipino. When its headquarters in Escolta was set up for sale at a heavy discount, he refused to buy the property.

== Political career ==
Madrigal won in the 1941 Senate Election under the banner of Nacionalista Party of Incumbent President Manuel L. Quezon. His wife had died a few months before his victory, in 1941.

He forbade his daughters from returning to Manila, fearing the Japanese. They remained in Washington, D.C. and New York, continuing their studies or furthering their careers in Diplomatic Service.

The Philippine Congress opened its session on June 9, 1945, but Madrigal was not able to serve due to charges of Collaboration. He had been part of the Japanese-sponsored government of Jose P. Laurel together with senators Claro M. Recto, Eulogio Rodriguez, Emiliano Tria Tirona, Quintin Paredes, Prospero Sebastian, Antonio de las Alas and Jose Yulo who was appointed Chief Justice during the war.

When Manuel Roxas was elected president on 1946, Madrigal, together with other collaborators, was pardoned. He was re-elected in 1947 under the banner of Liberal Party. He ran again in 1953 but was unsuccessful.

He later sponsored his second oldest daughter Pacita Madrigal, who won handily during Ramon Magsaysay's presidency.

== Legacy ==
In 1992, a public school in Binangonan, Rizal was built and was named after him, the Vicente Madrigal Municipal High School. Binangonan was once a stop-over point for Susana, who lived on the other side of Laguna de Bay in Pangil prior to marrying Madrigal.

== See also ==
- Vicente Madrigal National High School
- Jamby Madrigal
- Spanish Filipino
- Ligao, Albay
- Liberal Party of the Philippines
- Nacionalista Party
