= Luis Yangco =

Filipino-Chinese businessman (1841–1907)

Luis R. Yangco
- Born: Luis Rafael Yangco y Ronquillo; August 19, 1841; Bacoor, Cavite, Captaincy General of the Philippines
- Died: October 16, 1907 (aged 66); Manila, Philippine Islands
- Occupations: Businessman, philanthropist
- Spouses: Ramona Arguelles de Corpus; Dominga Lam; Victoria Obin
- Children: 3, including Teodoro Yangco

Luis Rafael Yangco y Ronquillo (August 19, 1841- October 16, 1907) was a Filipino-Chinese businessman and philanthropist who is popularly known during the Spanish colonial era as the "King of Manila Bay and Pasig River" for his vast shipping empire and extensive commercial shipping activities. He is also one of the Filipino-Chinese businessmen suspected of providing logistical and financial aid to the Katipunan during the Philippine Revolution.

== Early years ==
Yangco was born in Bacoor, Cavite on August 19, 1841, the son of Regimio Yangco, a mestizo sangley, and Agatona Ronquillo, a Spanish-Filipino mestiza, Yangco was orphaned at the age of 12, and thereafter he began working for a living under the care of a kind hearted aunt who gave him a little education. At the Cavite waterfront, he did odd jobs as errand-boy for sailors and cargador of passengers’ luggage. It was his exposure to life at the waterfront that set Yangco to dream of some day owning “many ships like those in the bay.”

== Shipping business ==
Through hard work and thrift as a cargador, Yangco was able to save enough money to buy a banca, which he used for transporting drinking water, ferrying people across the bay. When the Carriedo waterworks began supplying water to Manila residents, the business of transporting drinking water across the bay dwindled. He shifted to transporting zacate (horse fodder), timber and other goods for residents along the Pasig River. In due time he was able to purchase a sailboat for inter-island trading. This became the nucleus of a fleet of 28 steamships, in addition to the other lucrative businesses he engaged in.

Yangco also opened a modest store on Jaboneros Street in Manila and later became the sole agent of the Ayala distillery in the area. He also ventured into the lucrative rice and fuel trade, and a storage business at La Murallon Street. A just and generous businessman, he practiced the “fixed price” policy in his stores and profit sharing with his employees.

By 1870, his name became known in the business community of Binondo. His rise to success seemed unstoppable. He built several barges and engaged in the loading and unloading of merchandise for coast-wise and ocean-going ships. Around 1880, he bought a small steamship named La Mosca, which he put on the interisland shipping lane carrying both passengers and freight. His shipping business extended to Zambales in the north of Manila, the Laguna de Bay in east of Manila, and the coastal towns of Cavite, Batangas and Mindoro to as far south as Palawan.

For his exceptional ability and rapid success, Yangco was referred to as the “King of Manila Bay and Pasig River” among the shipping businessmen.

== Political career ==
Yangco's influence was extended to politics and public service. He became the capitan municipal of Binondo in 1893, and was later, appointed councilman of the Ayuntamiento de Manila. Being a respected businessman, his expertise was demanded by the business community as member of the permanent committees on public works, markets and slaughterhouses, police lighting, and designated inspector of the Divisoria market.

== Philippine Revolution ==
Before the Philippine Revolution, Yangco along with other prominent Filipino-Chinese businessmen like Telesforo Chiudian, Mariano Limjap, and Doroteo Ongjunco, were known to have financed the La Liga Filipina, a fraternal society established by reformist Dr. Jose Rizal with the aim of promoting political and economic reforms in the country. This ended when Rizal was exiled to Dapitan, Zamboanga on July 6, 1892. Some members of the La Liga Filipina like Andres Bonifacio and Deodato Arellano established the secret society called Katipunan, which advocated for armed revolution against Spain.

With the discovery of the Katipunan outbreak of the Philippine Revolution on August 23, 1896, Spanish authorities arrested Yangco and his son Teodoro on September 16, 1896. He was suspected of secretly supplying Filipino revolutionists with funds, foodstuffs, and other materials. After six months, he and his son were released from prison through a P10,000 bribe, and they promptly packed up their belongings and left for Spain.

Yangco returned to the Philippines in 1898, after the outbreak of the Spanish–American War. He later joined the revolutionary government, and later, the Malolos Republic established by Emilio Aguinaldo. He became part of his cabinet as director general of the treasury. He and Pedro Paterno also had plans to establish a central bank for the republic. Yangco later survived the Philippine–American War that followed after availing of the American offer of amnesty.

== Personal life ==
Yangco became a widower twice, and remarried two times. His first wife, Ramona Arguelles de Corpus, was from San Antonio, Zambales whom he met during his business trips in the province to transport textiles. Their son, Teodoro, who inherited his father's business acumen and shipping empire, later became a Resident Commissioner of the Philippines to the United States. After the death of his first wife, he married Dominga Lam who later died. His third marriage to Victoria Obin bore two daughters and one son.

Yangco died on October 16, 1907.

== See also ==
- Román Ongpin
- Mariano Limjap
