= Teodoro R. Yangco =

Filipino businessman and philanthropist

The Honourable Teodoro R. Yangco
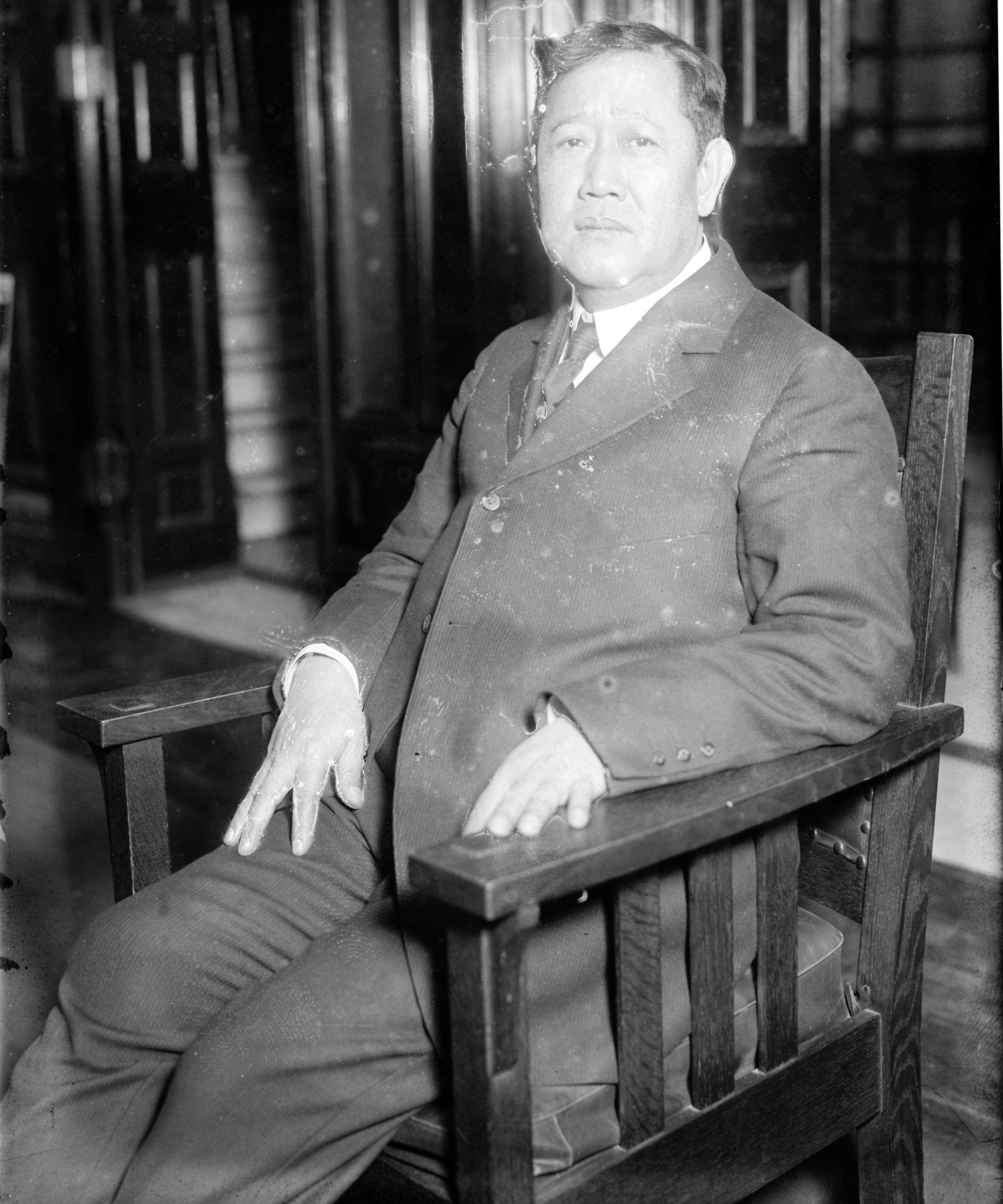

Resident Commissioner to the U.S. House of Representatives from the Philippine Islands
- In office March 4, 1917 – March 3, 1920
- Preceded by: Manuel L. Quezon
- Succeeded by: Isauro Gabaldon

President of the Chamber of Commerce of the Philippine Islands
- In office 1904
- Preceded by: Francisco Reyes
- Succeeded by: Rafael del Pan

Personal details
- Born: Teodoro Rafael Yangco y Argüelles; November 9, 1861 San Antonio, Zambales, Captaincy General of the Philippines
- Died: April 20, 1939 (aged 77)
- Resting place: Manila North Cemetery
- Citizenship: Philippine
- Parent(s): Luis R. Yangco; Ramona Arguelles vda. de Corpus
- Education: Ateneo Municipal de Manila; University of Santo Tomas
- Nickname: Theo

Teodoro Rafael "Theo" Yangco y Argüelles (November 9, 1861 – April 20, 1939) was a Filipino businessman who served in a variety of public and civic offices and was considered to be the foremost Filipino philanthropist of his time. He served as the Resident Commissioner of the Philippines from 1917 to 1920. He was the longest-serving president of the YMCA in the Philippines (1911–1925) and was called the "Father of the YMCA of the Philippines".

== Biography ==
Yangco was born on November 9, 1861, in San Antonio, Zambales. He was the only child of shipping magnate Luis R. Yangco and Ramona Arguelles Vda. de Corpus, widow of Tomas Corpus, and is of Chinese descent through his father. He graduated with a Bachelor of Arts degree at the Ateneo Municipal de Manila in 1880 and graduated from the University of Santo Tomas in 1881. He pursued a commercial course at Ealing Commercial College in London from 1882 to 1886.

Yangco established a shipping company, organized a bus company called TRY TRAN, set up a shipyard, and founded a big department store named Bazar Siglo XX and a huge dry-goods market in Divisoria called Yangco Market. He also became president of Insular Life. He followed his father's practice of investing his surplus earnings in properties suitable for commercial purposes.

A member of the Nacionalista Party, Yangco succeeded Manuel L. Quezon, who later became President of the Philippines, as Resident Commissioner of the Philippines to the U.S. Congress, and he served from March 4, 1917, to March 3, 1920. He was not a candidate for renomination in 1920 and resumed his business activities in Manila.

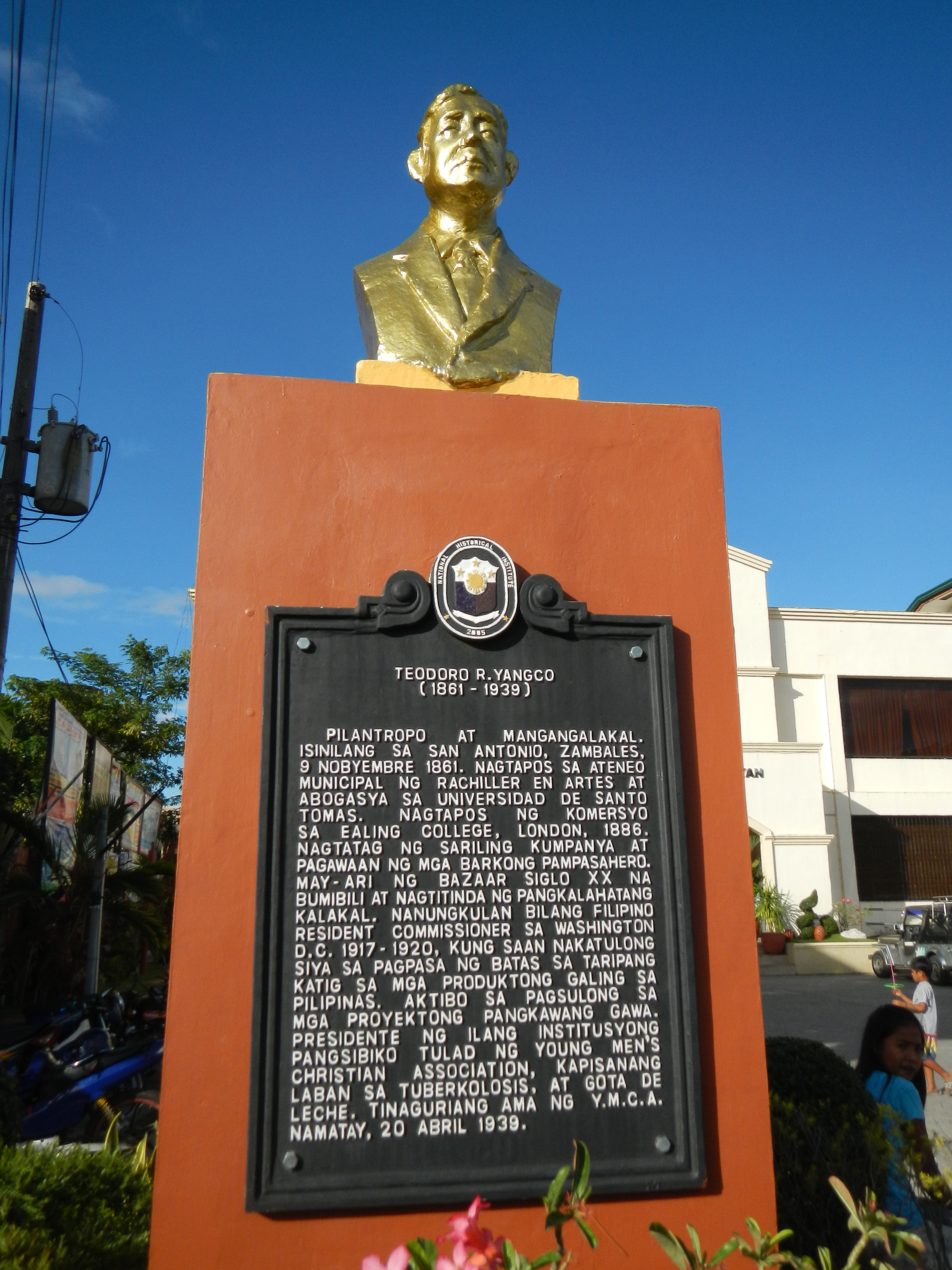
Teodoro R. Yangco Monument (San Antonio, Zambales Town Plaza)

Yangco was one of the founders of the Chamber of Commerce of the Philippines and was its president for several years. In 1923, he represented it in the first Pan Pacific Commercial Conference in Honolulu, Hawaii where he eloquently defended the cause for Philippine independence.

He died on April 20, 1939. He is buried in the Manila North Cemetery.

== Legacy ==
Yangco donated large sums of money to various charitable, religious and civic organizations. Aside from his cash donation, he also donated various parcels of land in Metro Manila and Zambales. One of the biggest properties he donated was the 31,031 square meter lot in a commercial area in Manila that became the site of YMCA of the Philippines.

Business positions
Preceded by Francisco Reyes	President of the Chamber of Commerce of the Philippine Islands; 1904	Succeeded by Rafael del Pan
U.S. House of Representatives
Preceded by Manuel L. Quezon	Resident Commissioner from the Philippines to the United States Congress; 1917–1920	Succeeded by Isauro Gabaldon
