= Francisco Afan Delgado =

Filipino diplomat and politician (1886-1964)

The Honorable Francisco Afan Delgado
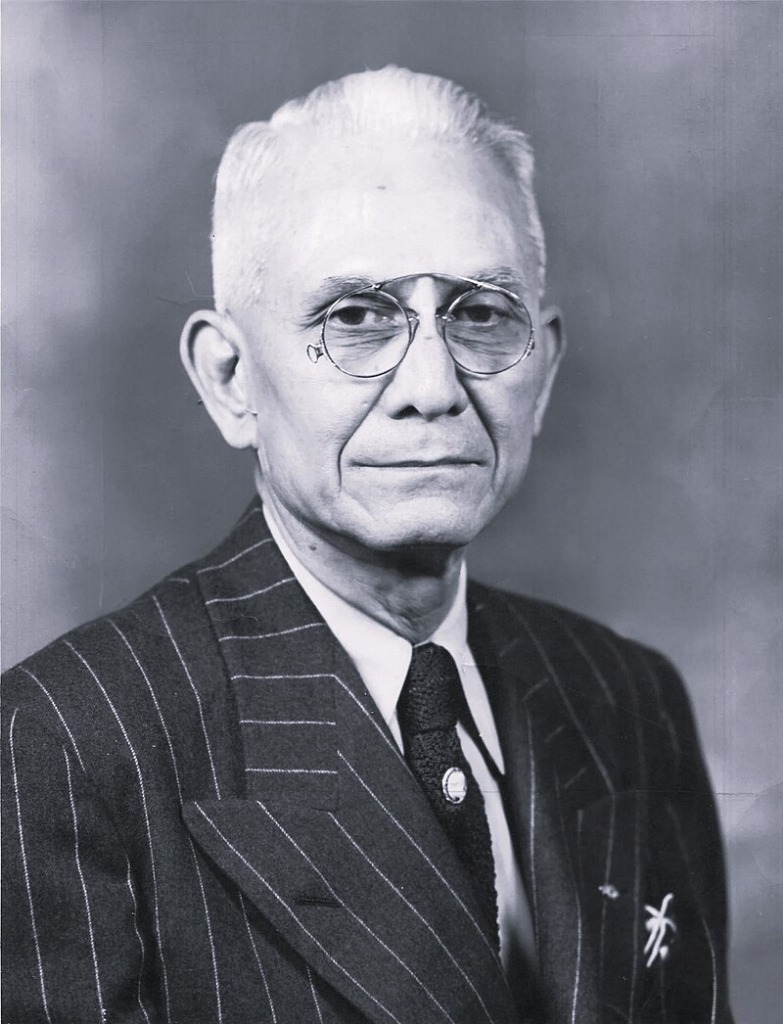

Senator of the Philippines
- In office December 30, 1951 – December 30, 1957

Resident Commissioner to the U.S. House of Representatives from the Philippine Islands
- In office January 3, 1935 – February 14, 1936 Serving with Pedro Guevara
- Preceded by: Camilo Osías
- Succeeded by: Quintin Paredes

Member of the Philippine House of Representatives from Bulacan's First District
- In office June 2, 1931 – September 16, 1935
- Preceded by: Angel Suntay
- Succeeded by: Nicolas Buendia

Personal details
- Born: Francisco Delgado y Afan; January 25, 1886 Bulacan, Captaincy General of the Philippines
- Died: October 27, 1964 (aged 78) Manila, Philippines
- Party: Nacionalista

Francisco Afan Delgado (January 25, 1886 – October 27, 1964) was a Filipino politician and diplomat who served as a Resident Commissioner from the Philippine Islands from 1935 to 1936.

== Political career ==
Delgado in 1919

Delgado returned to the Philippine Islands in 1908 and joined the Philippine Government as a law clerk. Later, he became the chief of the law division of the executive bureau, serving until 1913 when he resumed private law practice. In 1918, Delgado served in the Philippine National Guard and became a member of the National Council of Defense for the Philippines. From 1931 to 1935, he served in the Philippine House of Representatives for Bulacan's 1st district as a Nationalist.

He was elected as a Resident Commissioner to the United States and served from January 3, 1935, until February 14, 1936, when a successor qualified under the new government of the Commonwealth of the Philippine Islands. Delgado was appointed as a justice of the court of appeals in February 1936, serving until 1937. He then resumed his law practice and became a delegate to the International Committee of Jurists in Washington, D.C., and to the United Nations Conference in San Francisco, California in April 1945.

Delgado was a member of the Philippine War Damage Commission from June 4, 1946 to March 31, 1951. Subsequently, he served as a Senator from 1951 to 1957. Finally, Delgado held the position of Ambassador to the United Nations from September 29, 1958 to January 1, 1962.

== Achievements ==
Delgado was also an active member of the Freemasons, being a Shriner and The Grandmaster of the Grand Lodge of Freemasonry between 1926 and 1927 and founder of the Masonic Hospital for Children in Manila. He was the first Filipino made an active member of the American Bar Association in 1919 and organizer/director of the International Bar association.

== Death ==
Upon his retirement, he resided in Bulacan. He died in Manila on October 27, 1964.

== See also ==
- Resident Commissioner of the Philippines
- List of Asian Americans and Pacific Islands Americans in the United States Congress

U.S. House of Representatives
Preceded by Camilo Osías	Resident Commissioner from the Philippines to the United States Congress; 1935–1936; Served alongside: Pedro Guevara	Succeeded by Quintin Paredes
House of Representatives of the Philippines
Preceded by Ángelo Suntay	Member of the House of Representatives from Bulacan's 1st district 1931–1935	Succeeded by Nicolas Buendia
