= Nicolás Buendía =

Filipino politician (1879–1958)

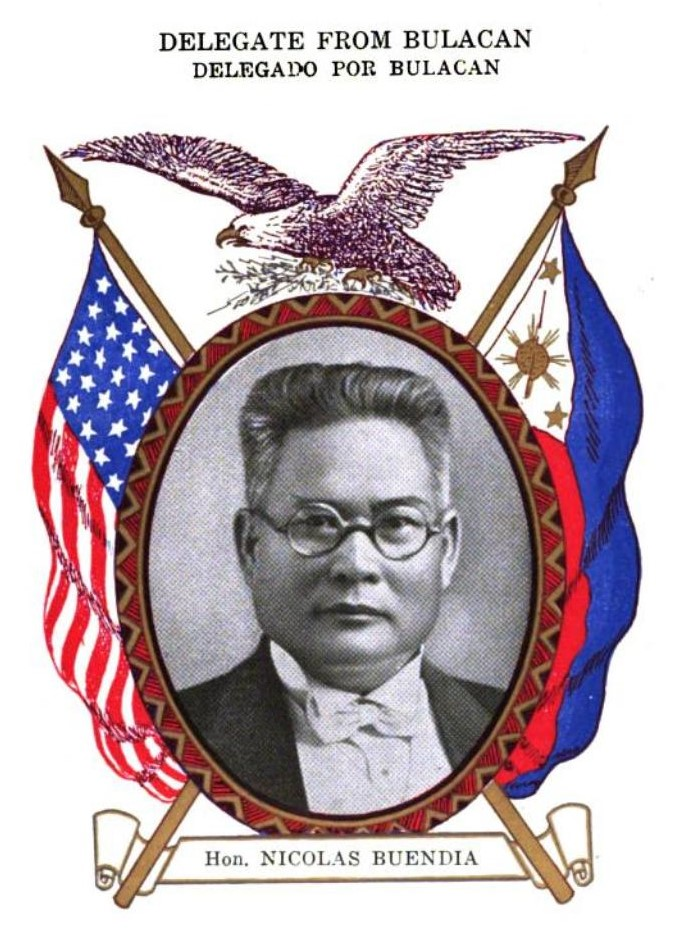
- Buendía as a delegate to the Philippine Constitutional Convention, published by Benipayo Press (c. 1935)

Senator of the Philippines
- In office May 25, 1945 – April 23, 1946

Member of the National Assembly from Bulacan's First District
- In office September 16, 1935 – December 30, 1941
- Preceded by: Francisco Afan Delgado
- Succeeded by: Leon Valencia

8th Governor of Bulacan
- In office 1916–1919
- Preceded by: Trinidad Icasiano
- Succeeded by: Juan B. Carlos

Personal details
- Born: Nicolás Buendía y Buidon; March 12, 1879 Malolos, Bulacan, Captaincy General of the Philippines
- Died: September 14, 1958 (aged 79) Sampaloc, Manila, Philippines
- Party: Nacionalista (1916–1958)
- Education: Colegio de San Juan de Letran; Farmacia del Liceo de Manila
- Profession: Lawyer, politician

Nicolás Buidon Buendía (born Nicolás Buendía y Buidon; March 12, 1879 – September 14, 1958) was a Filipino politician who served as Senator of the Philippines from 1941 to 1946, and from 1935 to 1941 as assemblyman of the first district of Bulacan.

== Personal life ==
Buendía was born in Malolos, Bulacan on March 12, 1879, to Saturnino Buendía and Petrona Buidon. He learned his first letter under General Teodoro Sandiko in Malolos.

He studied at Colegio de San Juan de Letran and obtained a degree of Bachelor of Arts in Liceo de Manila. He was admitted to the Philippine Bar in 1910.

He was one of the founding members of the Philippine Independent Church.

== Public service ==
During the insurrection against Spain, he was a first lieutenant of the Infantry of the Philippine Revolutionary Army. He was a member of the Balangay Apuy of the Katipunan as an aide-de-camp of General Isidoro Torres.

When Malolos fell and was invaded by the Americans during the American occupation in the Philippines, he became the Municipal President of Malolos on November 5, 1907, under the banner of Partido Nacionalista Unionista against Florencio Dalus of Partido Independiente Immediatista. He also became Municipal Secretary and Municipal Councilor of Malolos.

He became governor of Bulacan from 1916 to 1919. As governor, he saw the foundation of the National Guard, Bulacan Provincial chapter, an organization in preparation in the event that the Philippines will be involved in World War II, in 1917. On April 18, 1918, Buendia requested the Governor-General Francis Burton Harrison to appropriate money for the construction of the Bulacan Provincial Hospital to be named after Rev. Fr. Gregorio Crisostomo, to whose estate the money was to be taken from. He was a delegate to the Constitutional Convention before the Commonwealth period.

He was one of the founding members of the Philippine Independent Church.

He was elected Assemblyman for Bulacan's 1st district in 1935. He was-reelected for a second term in 1938 and served until 1941. He was elected Senator in 1941. However, Imperial Japan invaded the Philippines on December 8 at the onset of World War II, making him unable to serve his term until July 9, 1945. His term ended on April 23, 1946.

== Death ==
Nicolas died on September 14, 1958, in Manila.

== Legacy ==
Buendia Avenue was previously named after him until 1982, and renamed as Gil Puyat Avenue through Batasang Pambansa Blg. 312.

House of Representatives of the Philippines
Preceded by Francisco Afan Delgado	Member of the National Assembly from Bulacan's 1st district 1935–1941	Succeeded by Leon Valencia
Political offices
Preceded by Trinidad Icasiano	Governor of Bulacan; 1916–1919	Succeeded by Juan Carlos
