= Ramón J. Fernández =

Filipino businessman and politician

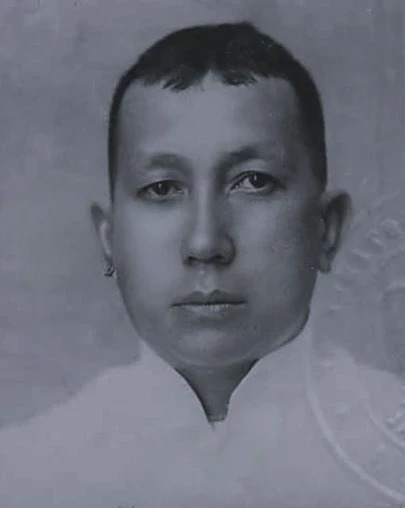
- Fernández on his U.S. passport application in 1917

Ambassador Minister Plenipotentiary of the Republic of the Philippines to the United Kingdom
- In office 1946–1949
- President: Manuel Roxas; Elpidio Quirino
- Preceded by: Position established
- Succeeded by: José E. Romero (as Ambassador Extraordinary and Plenipotentiary)

Senator of the Philippines
- In office July 9, 1945 – May 25, 1946

Senator of the Philippines from the 4th district
- In office October 3, 1923 – June 2, 1925
- Preceded by: Pedro Guevara
- Succeeded by: Juan Sumulong

4th Mayor of Manila
- In office March 7, 1920 – July 16, 1923
- Appointed by: Leonard Wood
- Vice Mayor: Juan Posadas Jr.
- Preceded by: Justo Lukban
- Succeeded by: Eulogio Rodriguez

President of the Chamber of Commerce of the Philippine Islands
- In office 1918–1919
- Preceded by: Jose F. Fernandez
- Succeeded by: Vicente Madrigal

1st Vice Mayor of Manila
- In office August 7, 1901 – August 7, 1907
- Mayor: Arsenio Cruz Herrera (1901–1905); Félix M. Roxas (1905–1907)
- Preceded by: Position created
- Succeeded by: Isabelo de los Reyes

Personal details
- Born: Ramón Julio Estevan Fernández y de Castro; April 12, 1878 San Miguel, Manila, Captaincy General of the Philippines
- Died: November 10, 1964 (aged 86) San Juan, Rizal, Philippines
- Party: Nacionalista
- Other political affiliations: Democrata
- Spouse: Felisa Valenzuela Hocson
- Education: Ateneo de Manila
- Occupation: Businessman, politician
- Nickname: Monching

Ramón Julio Estevan Fernández y de Castro (April 12, 1878 – November 10, 1964) was a Filipino businessman and politician who served as a Senator of the Philippines from 1923 to 1925 again from 1945 to 1946, He also served as the 4th Mayor of Manila from 1920 to 1923 and as 1st Vice Mayor of Manila from 1901 to 1907.

== Early life and education ==
Ramon Fernández was born on April 12, 1878, in the then-pueblo of San Miguel in Manila to Isidoro Fernández and Francisca de Castro. He studied at the Ateneo de Manila and then left for England, where he obtained his diploma in electrical engineering.

== Business career ==
In 1907, he started a shipping company called Fernández Hermanos with his brothers José and Vicente. In the years that followed, the company grew into one of the largest in the Philippines. Fernández also held many top positions in the Philippine business community over the years and was president of the Philippine Chamber of Commerce.

In 1913, Fernández was appointed as manager of the San Miguel Corporation, together with Enrique Brías de Coya. In 1918, after the resignation of Antonio Roxas, Ramón J. Fernández assumed the presidency of the company. In 1939, the management of the company was reorganized along the lines of American corporations, and Fernández was elected president of the board of directors.

On February 26, 1941, Fernández and a group of fellow businessmen headed by Andrés Soriano Sr. formally incorporated Philippine Air Lines, Inc.. Fernández and Soriano acquired the franchise of Philippine Aerial Taxi Company, Inc. and renamed it Philippine Air Lines (PAL). The airline's first flight took place on March 15, 1941, carrying the founders of the airline as its first passengers – Fernández, Soriano, Juan Miguel Elizalde, John R. Schultz and Ernesto Von Kaufmann.

== Political career ==
In 1901, Fernández was appointed as the first vice mayor of Manila, serving until 1904. In 1920, Fernández was appointed mayor of Manila by American Governor-General Leonard Wood. In July 1923, he resigned after his order to dismiss an American detective for accepting bribes from gambling houses was reversed by Wood. The incident led to the resignation of the Filipino members of Wood's cabinet and subsequently became known as the Cabinet Crisis of 1923.

Later that year, Fernández was elected to the Philippine Senate on behalf of the 4th district. He defeated Juan Sumulong in special elections to succeed Pedro Guevara who had been appointed Resident Commissioner to the United States. In the 1925 regular election, however, he lost to Sumulong. Later, Fernández was again elected to an at-large Senate in 1941. Because the Japanese invaded the Philippines shortly afterwards, he was only able to take office in 1945, following the liberation of the Philippines by the Americans.

== Death ==
Ramon Fernández died on November 10, 1964, in his hometown San Juan, then in Rizal, at the age of 86.

== In popular culture ==
He was portrayed by Nor Domingo in the 2025 film Quezon.
