= Antonio de las Alas =

Filipino lawyer, politician and business leader (1889-1983)

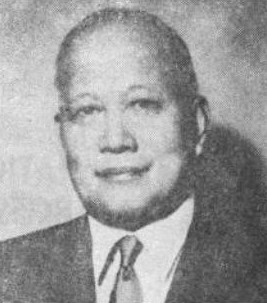
- De las Alas in 1967

Senator of the Philippines
- In office July 9, 1945 – May 25, 1946

Secretary of Finance
- In office February 19, 1936 – November 15, 1938
- President: Manuel L. Quezon
- Preceded by: Elpidio Quirino
- Succeeded by: Manuel Roxas

Secretary of Public Works and Communications
- In office January 26, 1933 – February 18, 1936
- Appointed by: Theodore Roosevelt Jr.
- President: Manuel L. Quezon
- Preceded by: Filemon Perez
- Succeeded by: Mariano Jesus Cuenco

Secretary of Interior
- Acting
- In office April 29, 1922 – May 23, 1922
- Succeeded by: Jose P. Laurel

Speaker pro tempore of the Philippine House of Representatives
- In office November 8, 1930 – January 25, 1933
- Preceded by: Quintín Paredes
- Succeeded by: Quintín Paredes
- In office November 13, 1923 – July 16, 1929
- Preceded by: Position established
- Succeeded by: Quintín Paredes

Member of the Philippine House of Representatives from Batangas's 1st district
- In office June 6, 1922 – February 18, 1933
- Preceded by: Vicente Lontoc
- Succeeded by: Ramón Diokno

President of the Chamber of Commerce of the Philippine Islands
- In office 1951–1954
- Preceded by: Daniel Aguinaldo
- Succeeded by: Teofilo Reyes Sr.

Personal details
- Born: October 14, 1889 Taal, Batangas, Captaincy General of the Philippines
- Died: October 5, 1983 (aged 93) Chicago, Illinois, United States
- Party: Nacionalista (1922–1983)
- Education: Indiana University Bloomington (LL.B); Yale University (LL.M)

Antonio Noble de las Alas (October 14, 1889 – October 5, 1983) was a Filipino lawyer, politician and business leader.

== Biography ==
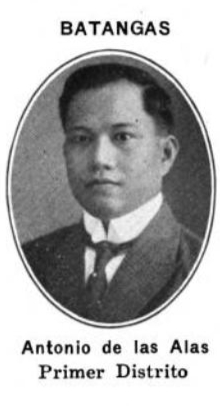
De las Alas as member of the House of Representatives, c. 1923

Antonio de las Alas was an acting Secretary of the Interior, four-term representative of the 1st district of Batangas in the Philippine Legislature, Secretary of Public Works and Communications, a member of the Senate of the Philippines during World War II, and a member of the constitutional convention delegation in 1934 and 1971. His signature is on an unissued 100-peso banknote dated 1944. After the war, he worked in many Filipino companies and institutions. He was the president of the Chamber of Commerce of the Philippine Islands from 1951 to 1954. In 1978, he received an Alumni service award. He died at the age of 94 in Illinois in 1983.

House of Representatives of the Philippines
| Preceded by Quintín Paredes | Speaker pro tempore of the House of Representatives; November 8, 1930 – January 25, 1933 (November 13, 1923 – July 16, 1929) | Succeeded by Quintín Paredes |
| New office | Speaker pro tempore of the House of Representatives; November 8, 1930 – January 25, 1933 (November 13, 1923 – July 16, 1929) | Succeeded by Quintín Paredes |
| Preceded by Vicente Lontoc | Member for Batangas's 1st district June 6, 1922 – February 18, 1933 | Succeeded by Ramón Diokno |
Political offices
| Preceded by Elpidio Quirino | Secretary of Finance; February 19, 1936 – November 15, 1938 | Succeeded by Manuel Roxas |
| Preceded by Filemon Perez | Secretary of Public Works and Communications; February 19, 1936 – November 15, 1938 | Succeeded by Mariano Cuenco |
Business positions
| Preceded by Daniel Aguinaldo | President of the Chamber of Commerce of the Philippine Islands; 1951–1954 | Succeeded by Teofilo Reyes Sr. |
