= 8th Philippine Legislature =

10th legislative term of the Philippines

←	7th	9th	→
- Old Legislative Building (c. 1988)

Overview
- Term: July 16, 1928 – November 7, 1930
- Governor-General: Henry L. Stimson (until February 23, 1929); Eugene Allen Gilmore (acting, February 23 – July 8, 1929); Dwight F. Davis (from July 8, 1929)

Senate
- Members: 24
- President: Manuel L. Quezon
- President pro tempore: Sergio Osmeña
- Majority leader: Jose P. Laurel

House of Representatives
- Members: 94
- Speaker: Manuel Roxas
- Speaker pro tempore: Antonio de las Alas (until July 16, 1929); Quintin Paredes (from July 16, 1929)
- Majority leader: Manuel Briones

The 8th Philippine Legislature was the meeting of the legislature of the Philippine Islands under the sovereign control of the United States from 1928 to 1930.

== Sessions ==
- First Regular Session: July 16 – November 8, 1928
- Special Session: February 9, 1929
- Second Regular Session: July 16 – November 11, 1929
- Third Regular Session: July 16 – November 7, 1930

== Party summary ==
Senate membership

Beginning of the Legislature

End of the Legislature

=== Senate ===
	Party (shading shows control)			Total	Vacant
	Nacionalista	Democrata	Independent	Total	Vacant
End of previous legislature	14	10	0	24	0
Begin	16	8	0	24	0
End	17	7	0	24	0
Final voting share	70.8%	29.2%	—N/a		
Beginning of next legislature	17	6	1	24	0

=== House of Representatives ===
Composition of the House of Representatives during the 8th Legislature.

	Party (shading shows control)				Total	Vacant
	Nacionalista	Democrata	Liberal	Independent	Total	Vacant
End of previous legislature	64	21	—N/a	7	92	0
Begin	74	12	—N/a	8	94	0
End	74	12	—N/a	8	94	0
Final voting share	78.7%	12.8%	—N/a	8.5%		
Beginning of next legislature	78	9	1	8	96	0

== Leadership ==
=== Senate ===
Senate President

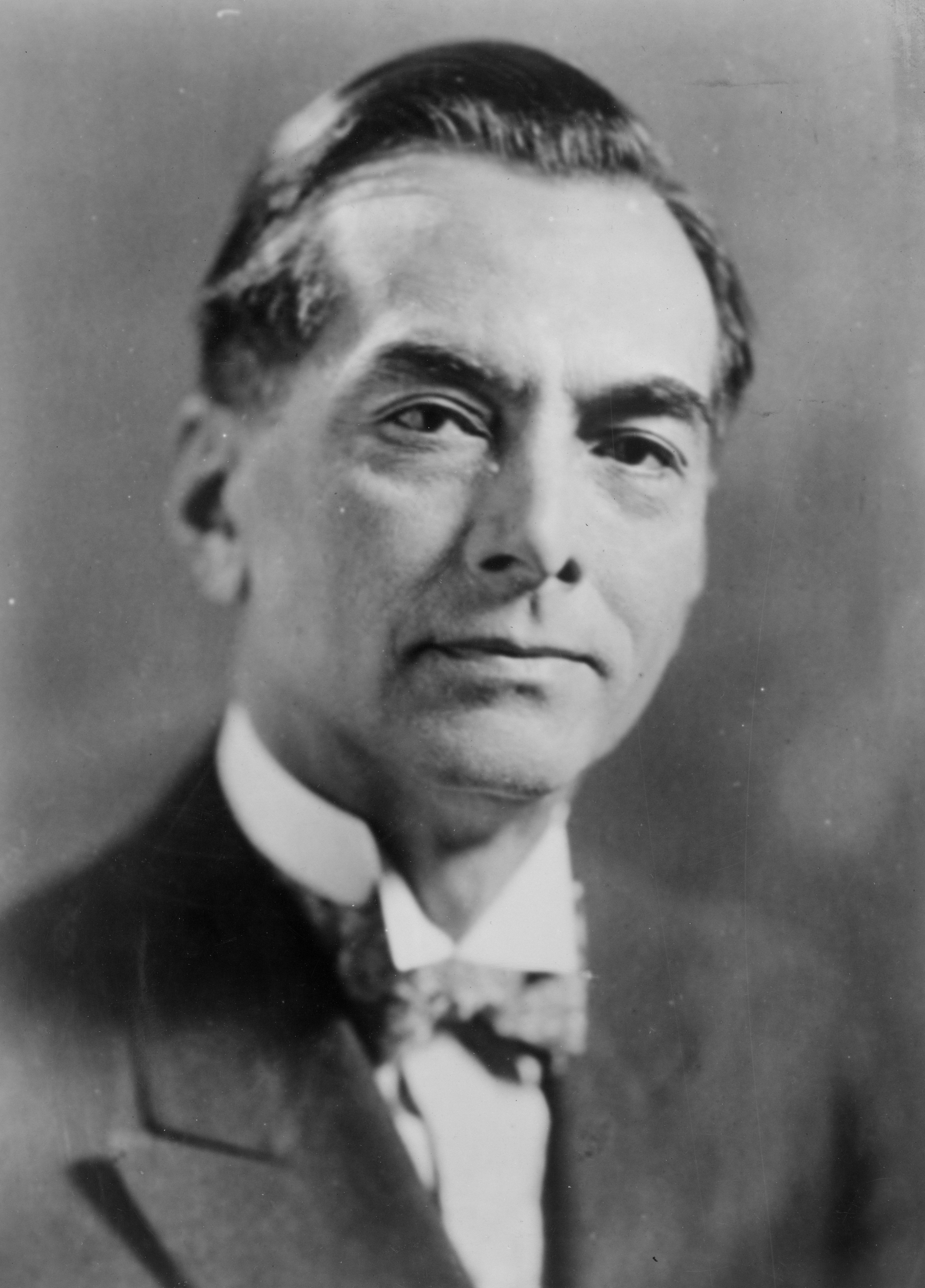
Manuel L. Quezon

- President: Manuel L. Quezon (5th District, Nacionalista)
- President pro tempore: Sergio Osmeña (10th District, Nacionalista)
- Majority Floor Leader: Jose P. Laurel (5th District, Nacionalista)

=== House of Representatives ===
House Speaker

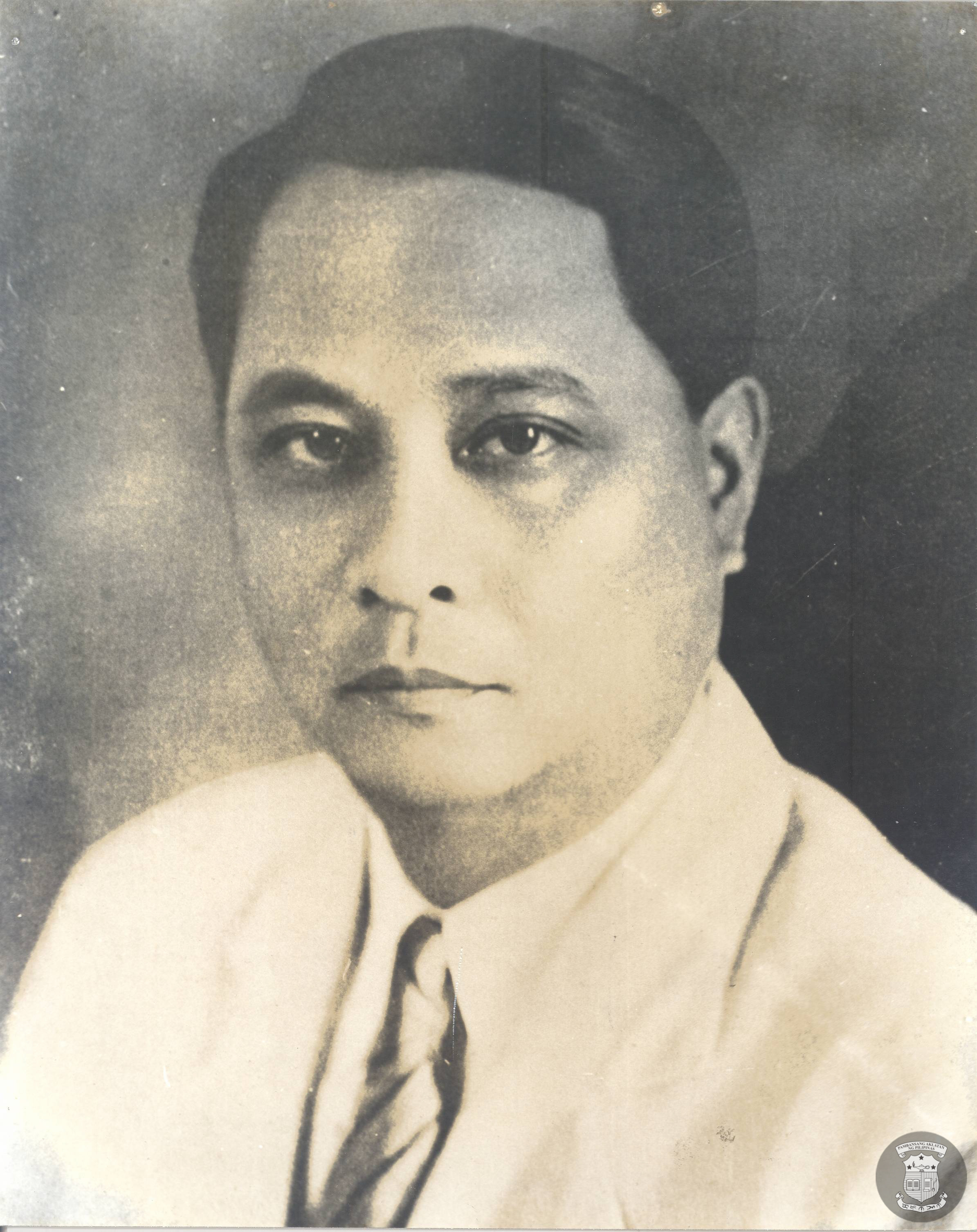
Manuel Roxas

- Speaker: Manuel Roxas (Capiz–1st, Nacionalista)
- Speaker pro tempore:
  - Antonio de las Alas (Batangas–1st, Nacionalista), until July 16, 1929
  - Quintin Paredes (Abra–Lone, Nacionalista), from July 16, 1929
- Majority Floor Leader: Manuel Briones (Cebu–1st, Nacionalista)

== Members ==
=== Senate ===
The following are the terms of the elected senators of this Legislature, according to the date of election:

- For senators elected on June 2, 1925: June 2, 1925 – June 2, 1931
- For senators elected on June 5, 1928: June 5, 1928 – June 5, 1934

Senators of the 12th District were appointed for indefinite terms.

District	Term end	Senator	Party
1st District	1931	Elpidio Quirino	Nacionalista
1st District	1934	Melecio Arranz	Nacionalista
2nd District	1931	Camilo Osias (Note: Camilo Osias was elected as Resident Commissioner of the Philippines on February 7, 1929.)	Nacionalista
2nd District	1931	Alejandro de Guzman (Note: Alejandro de Guzman was elected on April 4, 1929, to succeed Camilo Osias.)	Nacionalista
2nd District	1934	Teofilo Sison	Nacionalista
3rd District	1931	Teodoro Sandiko	Democrata
3rd District	1934	Benigno Aquino Sr.	Nacionalista
4th District	1931	Juan Sumulong	Democrata
4th District	1934	Jose Generoso	Democrata
5th District	1931	Jose P. Laurel	Nacionalista
5th District	1934	Manuel L. Quezon	Nacionalista
6th District	1931	Jose O. Vera	Nacionalista
6th District	1934	Jose Fuentebella	Nacionalista
7th District	1931	Jose Ledesma	Nacionalista
7th District	1934	Antonio Belo	Nacionalista
8th District	1931	Hermenegildo Villanueva	Nacionalista
8th District	1934	Mariano Yulo (Note: Mariano Yulo died on July 11, 1929.)	Nacionalista
8th District	1934	Francisco Zulueta (Note: Francisco Zulueta was elected on September 18, 1929, to succeed Mariano Yulo.)	Nacionalista
9th District	1931	Jose Maria Veloso	Democrata
9th District	1934	Jose Avelino	Democrata
10th District	1931	Pedro Rodriguez	Nacionalista
10th District	1934	Sergio Osmeña	Nacionalista
11th District	1931	Troadio Galicano	Democrata
11th District	1934	Jose Clarin	Nacionalista
12th District	—	Jose Alejandrino (Note: Jose Alejandrino was an appointed senator who resigned on July 14, 1928.)	Democrata
12th District	—	Hadji Butu (Note: Appointed.)	Democrata
12th District	—	Manuel Camus (Note: Manuel Camus was appointed on July 14, 1928, to succeed Jose Alejandrino.)	Nacionalista

=== House of Representatives ===
Province/City	District	Representative	Party
Abra	Lone	Quintin Paredes	Nacionalista
Albay	1st	Julian Belen	Nacionalista
Albay	2nd	Pedro Vera	Nacionalista
Albay	3rd	Pedro Sabido	Nacionalista
Antique	Lone	Segundo Moscoso	Nacionalista
Bataan	Lone	Teodoro Camacho	Nacionalista
Batanes	Lone	Mariano Lizardo	Nacionalista
Batangas	1st	Antonio de las Alas	Nacionalista
Batangas	2nd	Gavino S. Abaya	Nacionalista
Batangas	3rd	Jose D. Dimayuga	Nacionalista
Bohol	1st	Jose Concon	Independent
Bohol	2nd	Marcelo S. Ramirez	Independent
Bohol	3rd	Carlos P. Garcia	Nacionalista
Bulacan	1st	Angelo Suntay	Democrata
Bulacan	2nd	Cirilo B. Santos	Nacionalista
Cagayan	1st	Vicente Formoso	Nacionalista
Cagayan	2nd	Claro Sabbun	Nacionalista
Camarines Norte	Lone	Agustin Lukban	Nacionalista
Camarines Sur	1st	Mariano E. Villafuerte	Democrata
Camarines Sur	2nd	Manuel Fuentebella	Nacionalista
Capiz	1st	Manuel Roxas	Nacionalista
Capiz	2nd	Jose A. Dorado	Nacionalista
Capiz	3rd	Teodulfo Suñer	Nacionalista
Cavite	Lone	Antero Soriano (Note: Antero Soriano died on June 15, 1929.)	Nacionalista
Cavite	Lone	Fidel Ibañez (Note: Fidel Ibañez was elected on August 24, 1929, to succeed Antero Soriano.)	Nacionalista
Cebu	1st	Manuel Briones	Nacionalista
Cebu	2nd	Sotero Cabahug	Nacionalista
Cebu	3rd	Maximino Noel	Nacionalista
Cebu	4th	Juan Alcazaren	Nacionalista
Cebu	5th	Tomas N. Alonso	Nacionalista
Cebu	6th	Nicolas Rafols	Democrata
Cebu	7th	Paulino Ybañez	Nacionalista
Ilocos Norte	1st	Severo Hernando	Nacionalista
Ilocos Norte	2nd	Mariano Marcos	Nacionalista
Ilocos Sur	1st	Benito T. Soliven	Nacionalista
Ilocos Sur	2nd	Fidel B. Villanueva	Democrata
Iloilo	1st	Jose Zulueta	Nacionalista
Iloilo	2nd	Engracio Padilla	Democrata
Iloilo	3rd	Tomas Confesor	Nacionalista
Iloilo	4th	Tomas Buenaflor	Nacionalista
Iloilo	5th	Venancio Cudillo	Nacionalista
Isabela	Lone	Pascual Paguirigan	Nacionalista
La Union	1st	Pio Ancheta	Nacionalista
La Union	2nd	Mariano Villanueva	Independent
Laguna	1st	Roman Gesmundo	Nacionalista
Laguna	2nd	Arsenio Bonifacio	Nacionalista
Leyte	1st	Bernardo Torres	Nacionalista
Leyte	2nd	Tomas Oppus	Nacionalista
Leyte	3rd	Jorge B. Delgado	Nacionalista
Leyte	4th	Cirilo Bayaya	Nacionalista
Manila	1st	Francisco Varona	Nacionalista
Manila	2nd	Pedro Gil	Nacionalista
Marinduque	Lone	Ricardo Nepomuceno	Nacionalista
Masbate	Lone	Pio V. Corpus	Nacionalista
Mindanao and Sulu	Lone	Jose Artadi	Independent
Mindanao and Sulu	Lone	Jose Melencio	Independent
Mindanao and Sulu	Lone	Monico R. Mercado	Nacionalista
Mindanao and Sulu	Lone	Jose G. Sanvictores	Nacionalista
Mindanao and Sulu	Lone	Tabahur Taupan	Independent
Mindoro	Lone	Juan L. Luna	Nacionalista
Misamis	1st	Silvino Maestrado	Nacionalista
Misamis	2nd	Isidro Vamenta	Nacionalista
Mountain Province	Lone	Juan Cailles	Democrata
Mountain Province	Lone	Clemente Irving	Independent
Mountain Province	Lone	Saturnino Moldero	Independent
Negros Occidental	1st	Jose Locsin	Nacionalista
Negros Occidental	2nd	Vicente Jimenez Yanson	Nacionalista
Negros Occidental	3rd	Emilio Montilla	Nacionalista
Negros Oriental	1st	Guillermo Z. Villanueva	Nacionalista
Negros Oriental	2nd	Enrique Villanueva	Nacionalista
Nueva Ecija	1st	Hermogenes Concepcion Jr.	Nacionalista
Nueva Ecija	2nd	Aurelio Cecilio	Democrata
Nueva Vizcaya	Lone	Manuel Nieto	Nacionalista
Palawan	Lone	Patricio Fernandez	Nacionalista
Pampanga	1st	Fabian de la Paz	Nacionalista
Pampanga	2nd	Macario P. Ocampo	Democrata
Pangasinan	1st	Potenciano Pecson	Nacionalista
Pangasinan	2nd	Eugenio Perez	Nacionalista
Pangasinan	3rd	Rufo G. Cruz	Nacionalista
Pangasinan	4th	Eusebio V. Sison	Nacionalista
Pangasinan	5th	Juan G. Millan	Nacionalista
Rizal	1st	Manuel Bernabe	Democrata
Rizal	2nd	Luis Santiago	Nacionalista
Romblon	Lone	Leonardo Festin	Nacionalista
Samar	1st	Tiburcio Tancinco	Nacionalista
Samar	2nd	Serafin S. Marabut	Nacionalista
Samar	3rd	Gregorio B. Abogado	Nacionalista
Sorsogon	1st	Justino Encinas	Nacionalista
Sorsogon	2nd	Francisco Arellano	Nacionalista
Surigao	Lone	Montano Ortiz	Democrata
Tarlac	1st	Gregorio M. Bañaga	Democrata
Tarlac	2nd	Jose G. Domingo	Democrata
Tayabas	1st	Fabian R. Millar	Nacionalista
Tayabas	2nd	Leon Guinto (Note: Leon Guinto was appointed as Governor of Tayabas on September 10, 1928.)	Nacionalista
Tayabas	2nd	Marcelo T. Boncan (Note: Marcelo T. Boncan was elected on October 6, 1928, to succeed Leon Guinto.)	Nacionalista
Zambales	Lone	Gregorio Anonas	Nacionalista

== Changes in membership ==
=== Senate ===
District	Incumbent				Special election	Successor		
District	Senator	Party	Date	Reason	Special election	Senator	Party	Date
12th District	Jose Alejandrino	Democrata	July 14, 1928	Resigned	—N/a	Manuel Camus	Nacionalista	July 14, 1928
2nd District	Camilo Osias	Nacionalista	February 7, 1929	Elected Resident Commissioner of the Philippines	April 4, 1929	Alejandro de Guzman	Nacionalista	April 4, 1929
8th District	Mariano Yulo	Nacionalista	July 11, 1929	Died in office	September 18, 1929	Francisco Zulueta	Nacionalista	September 18, 1929

=== House of Representatives ===
District	Incumbent				Special election	Successor		
District	Member	Party	Date	Reason	Special election	Member	Party	Date
Tayabas–2nd	León Guinto	Nacionalista	September 10, 1928	Appointed Governor of Tayabas	October 6, 1928	Marcelo T. Boncan	Nacionalista	October 6, 1928
Cavite–Lone	Antero Soriano	Nacionalista	June 15, 1929	Died in office	August 24, 1929	Fidel Ibañez	Nacionalista	August 24, 1929

== See also ==
- 1928 Philippine legislative election
  - 1928 Philippine Senate elections
  - 1928 Philippine House of Representatives elections
