= List of members of the Nacionalista Party =

This is a list of the Members of the Nacionalista Party.

The Nacionalista Party is a Filipino conservative political party. Their origin stems from 1907, when the party was founded by Manuel Quezon and Sergio Osmeña, signifying the first political party in the Philippines. Nacionalista had countless members from all over the country.

The members are divided into their highest position, whether it be congressman, governor, vice-governor, etc.

Some of the lists (Senator, Congressman and Governor) are separated into different tables, (The senators are separated by the first letter of their surname, The governors are separated by their respective region, and the representatives are separated by their respective provinces).

== Members ==
=== Presidents ===
Name	Positions	Notes	References
Manuel Quezon	Governor of Tayabas, Congressman of Tayabas, Assembly Majority Leader, Senator of the Philippines from the 5th district, Mayor of Quezon City, 1st President of the Senate of the Philippines, 2nd President of the Philippines		
Jose P. Laurel	Senate Majority Leader, Senator of the Philippines	as Nacionalista	
Sergio Osmeña	3rd Governor of Cebu, 1st Speaker of the House of Representatives of the Philippines, Congressman for Cebu's 2nd congressional district, Senator of the Philippines's 10th senatorial district, 1st Vice President of the Philippines, 4th President of the Philippines		
Manuel Roxas	Governor of Capiz, Congressman for Capiz's 1st congressional district, 2nd Speaker of the House of Representatives of the Philippines, Senator of the Philippines	as Nacionalista	
Elpidio Quirino	Congressman for Ilocos Norte's 1st congressional district, Senator of the Philippines	as Nacionalista	
Ramon Magsaysay	7th President of the Philippines	as Nacionalista	
Carlos P. Garcia	Congressman for Bohol's 3rd congressional district, Governor of Bohol, Senator of the Philippines, 4th Vice President of the Philippines, 8th President of the Philippines		
Ferdinand Marcos	10th President of the Philippines	as Nacionalista	
Joseph Estrada	Mayor of San Juan, Senator of the Philippines	as Nacionalista	
Rodrigo Duterte	Mayor of Davao City	as Nacionalista	
Bongbong Marcos	Congressman for Ilocos Norte's 2nd congressional district, Senator of the Philippines	as Nacionalista	

=== Vice Presidents ===
Name	Positions	Notes	References
Fernando Lopez	Mayor of Iloilo City, Senator of the Philippines, 7th Vice President of the Philippines	as Nacionalista	
Emmanuel Pelaez	6th Vice President of the Philippines, Congressman for Misamis Oriental's at-large congressional district, Senator of the Philippines	as Nacionalista	
Salvador Laurel	Senator of the Philippines, 5th Prime Minister of the Philippines, 8th Vice President of the Philippines	as Nacionalista	

=== Senators ===
==== A ====
Name	Positions	District	Notes	References
Juan B. Alegre	Senator of the Philippines	6th senatorial district	as Nacionalista	
Alejandro Almendras	Governor of Davao, Senator of the Philippines, Governor of Davao del Sur	Nationwide at-large	as Nacionalista	
Alauya Alonto	Congressman for Department of Mindanao and Sulu's Lone-District, Senator of the Philippines	Nationwide at-large		
Domocao Alonto	Congressman for Lanao's at-large congressional district, Senator of the Philippines	Nationwide at-large		
Jose Altavas	Congressman for Capiz's 2nd congressional district, Senator of the Philippines	7th senatorial district	as Nacionalista	
Benigno Aquino Sr.	Congressman for Tarlac's 2nd congressional district, Senator of the Philippines	3rd senatorial district	as Nacionalista	
Melecio Arranz	Senator of the Philippines	1st senatorial district	as Nacionalista	
José María Arroyo	Congressman for Iloilo's 1st congressional district, Senator of the Philippines	7th senatorial district		
Dominador Aytona	Senator of the Philippines	Nationwide at-large		

==== B ====
Name	Positions	District	Notes	References
Eulogio Balao	Senator of the Philippines	Nationwide at-large		
Sotero Baluyut	Governor of Pampanga, Senator of the Philippines	3rd senatorial district		
Antonio Belo	Senator of the Philippines	7th senatorial district		
Helena Benitez	Senator of the Philippines	Nationwide at-large	as Nacionalista	
Manuel Briones	Congressman for Cebu's 1st congressional district, Senator of the Philippines	10th senatorial district, Nationwide at-large		
Nicolás Buendía	Governor of Bulacan, Senator of the Philippines	Nationwide at-large		
Hadji Butu	Senator of the Philippines	12th senatorial district		

==== C ====
Name	Positions	District	Notes	References
Tomas Cabili	Senator of the Philippines	Nationwide at-large	as Nacionalista	
Aquilino Calvo	Senator of the Philippines	2nd senatorial district		
Manuel Camus	Senator of the Philippines	12th senatorial district		
Nicolas Capistrano	Congressman for Misamis's 2nd congressional district, Senator of the Philippines	11th senatorial district		
Alan Peter Cayetano	Congressman for Taguig–Pateros's at-large congressional district, Senator of the Philippines	Nationwide at-large	as Nacionalista	
Pia Cayetano	Congressman for Taguig–Pateros's 2nd congressional district, Senator of the Philippines	Nationwide at-large	as Nacionalista	

=== Mayors and Vice Mayors ===
==== D ====
Name	Positions	Notes	References
Isko Moreno Domagoso	Vice Mayor of Manila (2009 – 2012)	as Nacionalista	

==== E ====
Name	Positions	Notes	References
Joseph Ejercito Estrada	Mayor of San Juan (1969 – 1987)	as Nacionalista	
