= 1928 Philippine Senate elections =

5th Philippine senatorial election

- June 5, 1928

11 of the 24 seats in the Philippine Senate
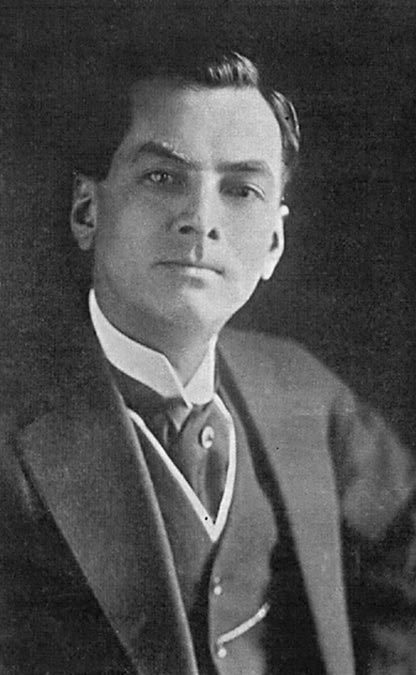

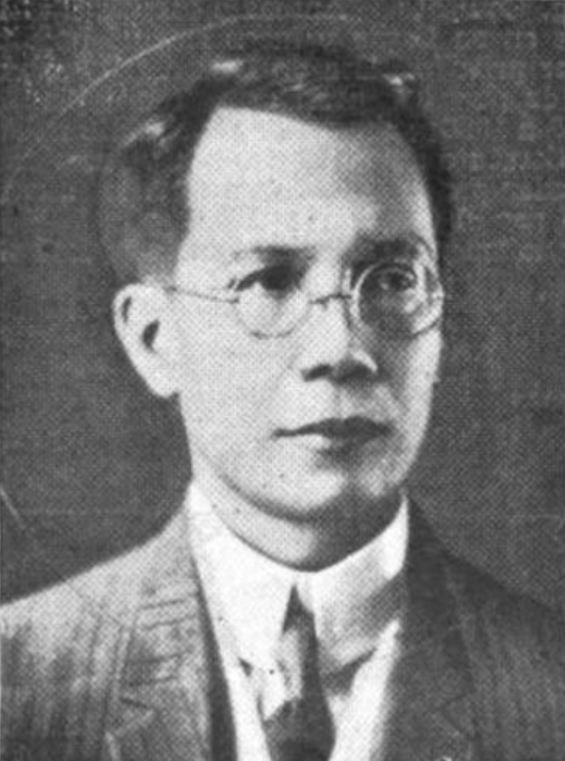
	Majority party	Minority party
Leader	Manuel L. Quezon	Juan Sumulong
Party	Nacionalista	Democrata
Leader's seat	5th District	3rd District
Seats before	14	10
Seats won	9	2
Seats after	16	8
Seat change	▲2	▼2
- Election results; each district sent in two seats to the Senate. 2 Nacionalistas 2 Democratas 1 Nacionalista and 1 Democrata
Senate President before election
Manuel L. Quezon
Nacionalista
Elected Senate President
Manuel L. Quezon
Nacionalista

Legislative elections happened on June 5, 1928, in the Philippines under the Jones Law provisions.

== Electoral system ==
In a staggered election, the seats of the senators who were first disputed in 1922 were up for election. The Philippines is divided into 12 senatorial districts, of which all districts save for the 12th district, has one of its seats up. In the 12th district, any vacancy is filled via appointment of the Governor-General. The election itself is via first-past-the-post.

== Results ==
↓

16	8
Nacionalista	Democrata

=== Philippines's 1st senatorial district ===
Candidate	Party	Votes	%
Melecio Arranz	Partido Nacionalista Consolidado	28,774	58.86
Isabelo de los Reyes	Partido Democrata Nacional	20,115	41.14
Total		48,889	100.00

=== Philippines's 2nd senatorial district ===
Candidate	Party	Votes	%
Teofilo Sison	Partido Nacionalista Consolidado	31,225	61.23
Alejo Mabanag	Partido Democrata Nacional	19,773	38.77
Total		50,998	100.00

=== Philippines's 3rd senatorial district ===
Candidate	Party	Votes	%
Benigno Aquino Sr.	Partido Nacionalista Consolidado	60,258	63.92
Luis Morales	Partido Democrata Nacional	34,006	36.08
Total		94,264	100.00

=== Philippines's 4th senatorial district ===
Candidate	Party	Votes	%
Jose Generoso	Partido Nacionalista Consolidado	55,449	54.53
Emiliano Tria Tirona	Partido Democrata Nacional	46,228	45.47
Total		101,677	100.00

=== Philippines's 5th senatorial district ===
Candidate	Party	Votes	%
Manuel L. Quezon	Partido Nacionalista Consolidado	47,551	100.00
Total		47,551	100.00

=== Philippines's 6th senatorial district ===
Candidate	Party	Votes	%
José Fuentebella	Partido Nacionalista Consolidado	30,008	54.98
Juan B. Alegre	Partido Democrata Nacional	24,574	45.02
Total		54,582	100.00

=== Philippines's 7th senatorial district ===
Candidate	Party	Votes	%
Antonio Belo	Partido Nacionalista Consolidado	21,054	56.29
Jose Hontiveros	Partido Democrata Nacional	16,347	43.71
Total		37,401	100.00

=== Philippines's 8th senatorial district ===
Candidate	Party	Votes	%
Mariano Yulo	Partido Nacionalista Consolidado	28,774	65.25
Angel Salazar	Partido Democrata Nacional	15,326	34.75
Total		44,100	100.00

=== Philippines's 9th senatorial district ===
Candidate	Party	Votes	%
Jose Avelino	Partido Democrata Nacional	12,443	54.94
Esteban Singson	Partido Nacionalista Consolidado	10,206	45.06
Total		22,649	100.00

=== Philippines's 10th senatorial district ===
Candidate	Party	Votes	%
Sergio Osmeña	Partido Nacionalista Consolidado	38,641	65.76
Vicente Sotto	Partido Democrata Nacional	20,116	34.24
Total		58,757	100.00

=== Philippines's 11th senatorial district ===
Candidate	Party	Votes	%
Jose Clarin	Partido Nacionalista Consolidado	14,265	56.44
Juan Torralba	Independent	11,008	43.56
Total		25,273	100.00

=== Philippines's 12th senatorial district* ===
Candidate	Party
Manuel Camus	Partido Nacionalista Consolidado
Hadji Butu	Partido Democrata Nacional
Total

- Non-elective positions. Appointed by the American Governor-General

=== September 18, 1929 Special Election for Philippines's 8th senatorial district ===
To serve the unexpired term of Senator Mariano Yulo, who resigned on July 11, 1929. The winner will serve until 1934.

Candidate	Party	Votes	%
Francisco Zulueta	Partido Nacionalista	14,574	100.00
Total		14,574	100.00

Party	Seats				
Party	Up	Before	Won	After	+/−
Nacionalista	7	14	9	16	+2
Democrata	4	8	2	6	−2
Appointed (Note: The two appointed senators were from Democrata.)	0	2	0	2	0
Total	11	24	11	24	2

== See also ==
- 8th Philippine Legislature
- Commission on Elections
- Politics of the Philippines
- Philippine elections
