= Bernabé de Guzmán =

Filipino lawyer and politician (born 1882)

The Honorable Bernabé de Guzmán
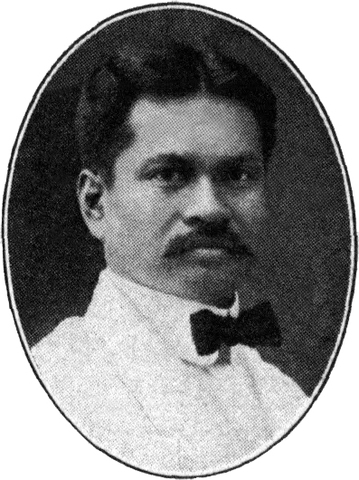
- de Guzmán as member of the Philippine House of Representatives, c. 1917

Senator of the Philippines from the 2nd district
- In office 3 June 1919 – 2 June 1925 Serving with Teofilo Sison; Alejo Mabanag
- Preceded by: Matias Gonzales
- Succeeded by: Camilo Osias

Member of the Philippine House of Representatives from Pangasinan's 5th district
- In office 16 October 1916 – 3 June 1919
- Preceded by: Hugo Sansano
- Succeeded by: Ricardo Gonzalez

Personal details
- Born: July 15, 1882 Bauang, La Union, Captaincy General of the Philippines

Bernabé de Guzmán y Floirendo (July 15, 1882 – unknown) was a Filipino lawyer and politician. He was also a senator from the Second Senatorial District of the Philippines from 1919 to 1925. He represented the fifth district of Pangasinan at the House of Representatives of the Philippines from 1916 to 1919.

== Early life and education ==
Bernabé de Guzman was born on July 15, 1882, in Bauang, La Union to Pelayo de Guzman and Graciana Floirendo. He completed a Bachelor of Arts degree from the Liceo de Manila and earned a bachelor's degree in law from the University of Santo Tomas.

== Political career ==
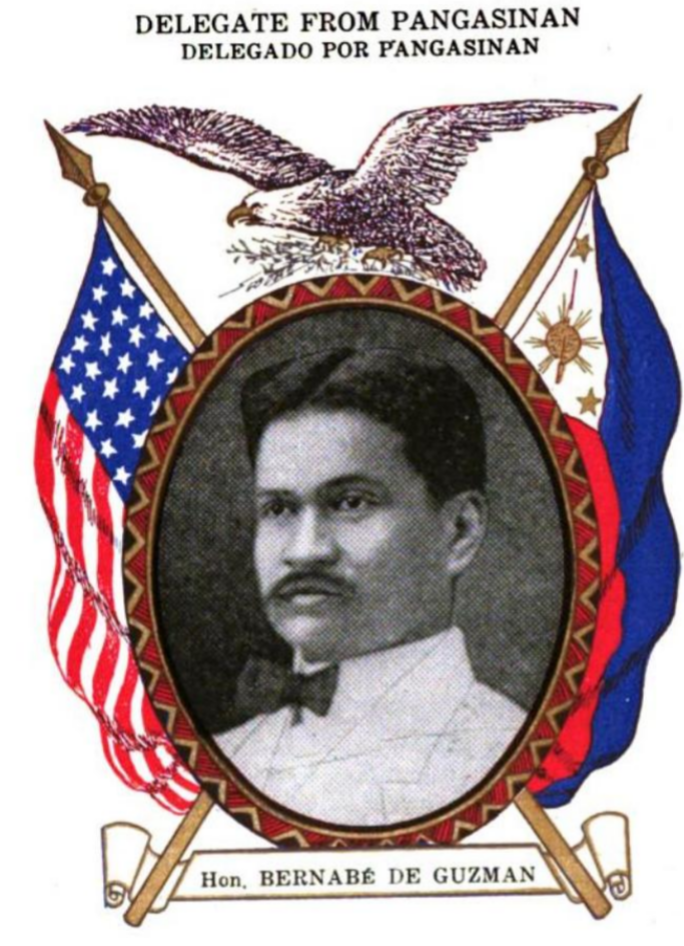
Photograph published by Benipayo Press, c. 1935

In 1916, de Guzman was elected to the Philippine House of Representatives on behalf of Pangasinan's 5th district. In 1919, he was elected to represent the 2nd district in the Senate of the Philippines and served until 1925. In 1934, de Guzman was elected as a delegate to the Constitutional Convention that drafted the 1935 Philippine Constitution.

== Personal life ==
His brother, Alejandro de Guzmán, was also a senator from 1929 to 1931. He was married to Clotilde Moreno and has three children.
