= Nacionalista Party =

Conservative political party in the Philippines

Nacionalista Party Partido Nacionalista
- Abbreviation: NP; Nacionalista
- President: Manny Villar
- Chairperson: Cynthia Villar
- Secretary General: Mark Villar
- Spokesperson: Ace Barbers
- Founder: Manuel L. Quezon; Sergio Osmeña
- Founded: April 29, 1907; 119 years ago
- Merger of: Partido Union Nacionalista; Partido Independista Imediatista
- Headquarters: Starmall EDSA-Shaw 4F, EDSA corner Shaw Boulevard, Mandaluyong, Metro Manila
- Youth wing: Young Nacionalistas
- Membership: 1.2 million
- Ideology: Conservatism; National conservatism; Filipino nationalism; Economic liberalism; Populism Historical: Economic nationalism
- Political position: Centre-right to right-wing
- National affiliation: Bagong Pilipinas (2024–2025) Former: UNIDO (1980–1986) GAD (1987) K4 (2004) GO (2007) Team PNoy (2013) Coalition for Change (2016–2019) HNP (2019) UniTeam (2021–2022)
- Colors: National colors: Red, blue, and white Customary: Light green Orange
- Slogan: Ang Bayan Higit sa Lahat ('The Nation Above All')
- Senate: 4 / 24
- House of Representatives: 18 / 318
- Provincial Governors: 11 / 82
- Provincial Vice Governors: 3 / 82
- Provincial Board Members: 56 / 840

Website
- www.nacionalistaparty.com

The Nacionalista Party (Filipino and Spanish: Partido Nacionalista; lit. 'Nationalist Party,' NP) is a political party in the Philippines that is the oldest existing party in the country and in Southeast Asia. It was responsible for leading the country throughout most of the 20th century since its founding in 1907; it was the ruling party from 1935 to 1946 (under Manuel L. Quezon and Sergio Osmeña), 1953 to 1961 (under Ramon Magsaysay and Carlos P. Garcia), and 1965 to 1978 (under Ferdinand Marcos), and also was one of the two dominant political parties (along with the Liberal Party) throughout the existence of the Third Republic.

== Ideology ==
The Nacionalista Party was initially created as a Filipino nationalist party that supported Philippine independence until 1946, when the United States granted independence to the country. Since then, many scholarly articles that dealt with the history of political parties during the Third Republic agreed that the party has been increasingly populist, although some have argued they have conservative tendencies because of their opposition to the Liberal Party and the Progressive Party.

== History ==
=== American Insular to Commonwealth era ===
The party was organized as a vehicle for Philippine independence, advocating self-rule; and espousing this advocacy through representation in the Philippine Assembly of 1907–1916, and in the succeeding Philippine Legislature of 1916–1935. The ranks of Nationalist politicians rose to prominence through the Commonwealth of the Philippines spanning 1935–1941, ending when political parties were replaced by a singular and monolithic party KALIBAPI during the Japanese occupation of the Philippines.

=== Osmeña to Quirino presidencies: 1944–1953 ===
==== Break-away of the "Liberal" wing and 1946 elections ====
Manuel Roxas, Elpidio Quirino, and their allies called for an early general election, which elects the president, vice president, and members of the Congress, and lobbied it to their allies in the United States Congress. In December 1945, the House Insular Affairs Committee of the US Congress approved the joint resolution, setting the election date by April 23, 1946.

Prompted by this congressional action, President Sergio Osmeña called the Philippine Congress to a three-day special session. Congress enacted Commonwealth Act No. 725, setting the election date on April 23, 1946. President Osmeña signed the act on January 5, 1946.

Nacionalista Party 1949 logo seen in Jose P. Laurel's presidential campaign (logo used from 1946 to 1953)

The Nacionalista Party was divided into two factions: the Conservative wing, also known as the pro-Osmeña wing, and the Liberal wing, which was led by Roxas and Quirino. On January 3, 1946, Osmeña announced his re-election bid. But the Liberal wing became the Liberal Party and was officially founded on January 19, 1946, with its leaders Roxas and Quirino as party nominees for president and vice president, respectively.

On January 22, 1946, former Rizal congressman and Senator Eulogio "Amang" Rodriguez was nominated as Osmeña's running mate for vice president in a convention held at Ciro's Club in Manila. But the tandem of Osmeña and Rodriguez was defeated by Roxas and Quirino of Liberal.

==== Opposition to the Roxas and Quirino Administrations ====
After the victory of the Liberals, Nacionalista only won 1 of 8 seats in the 1947 Senate election, by Camilo Osias. In the 1949 presidential elections, Nacionalista fielded former "collaborator" and political veteran Jose P. Laurel, with former Senator and Supreme Court Associate Justice Manuel Briones as his running mate. Even though the Nacionalistas had the advantage of the Liberals' divide, with Quirino running for his own full term and Senator José Avelino running with another wing, Quirino prevailed against Laurel. Former general and future diplomat Carlos P. Romulo and Marvin M. Gray considered the 1949 edition as the dirtiest election in Philippine electoral history. In the senate election of the same year, anti-American Claro M. Recto only managed to win after an election protest.

=== Magsaysay presidency: 1953–1957 ===
==== Recruitment of Magsaysay vs. Quirino ====
1953 Nacionalista Convention
Candidate		
Name	Ramon Magsaysay	Camilo Osías
Votes	702	49

Former President and then-Senator Jose P. Laurel initially had intentions to seek the Nacionalista's nomination for president in 1953 but did not go through with it. He then proposed to endorse then-Secretary of National Defense Ramon Magsaysay, whose successful anti-insurgency and anti-communist initiatives had strained his relations with President Quirino and the Liberal Party. But Senate President Camilo Osías sought the presidential nomination but ultimately lost to Magsaysay. This prompted Osias to jump to the Liberal Party. In the convention, Senator Carlos P. Garcia of Bohol was picked to be his running mate, defeating Jose Zulueta (who also jumped to the Liberal Party with Osias).

==== Support from Democrats ====
Also, the country's ambassador to the United Nations, Carlos Romulo, and incumbent Vice President Fernando Lopez, who founded the Democratic Party from the Liberal Party and originally intended to run for president and vice president, respectively, withdrew, and Lopez sought a place in the Senate. The tandem of Magsaysay and Garcia won the election in 1953. In the 1953 Senate elections, only Lorenzo Tañada won from a party other than Nacionalista or Democratic, while in 1955, the Nacionalistas swept all eight candidates.

=== Garcia to Macapagal presidencies: 1957–1965 ===
After Magsaysay's plane crashed on Mt. Manunggal while riding a Douglas C-47 Skytrain, Carlos Garcia assumed the presidency for the last months of Magsaysay's unfinished term. He won a re-election in 1957, but for the first time in the electoral history of the Philippines, Garcia had a vice president who did not have the same party or his opponent's running mate as Garcia's running mate; Jose P. Laurel's son and former House Speaker Pepito Laurel was defeated by Kapampangan Congressman Diosdado Macapagal.

Juan Pajo, the then-governor of Bohol, held the Bible on which Garcia took oath, breaking the tradition wherein it is held by presidential spouses. A faction led by Manuel Manahan and Raul Manglapus formed a pro-Magsaysay faction due to dissatisfaction of members of the Nacionalista Party over the "cold treatment" given to them by allies of Garcia. The faction later became the Progressive Party. Also, Senate President Rodriguez clash with President Garcia, citing differences on latter's Filipino First policy, and the former's list of corrupt close officials tied to the president that media dubbed "White Paper".

In 1961, after a divided party due to nomination delays, incumbent President Garcia successfully got the nomination. But he lost the opportunity for a second full term as president of the Philippines to Vice President Diosdado Macapagal. Also, Senator Gil Puyat, Garcia's running mate, lost to Senator Emmanuel Pelaez and was behind Serging Osmeña, the son of the party's founder. Jose Roy and Lorenzo Sumulong are those Nacionalistas who managed to gain seats.

Nacionalista Party logo used from 1953 to 1986

==== 1965 elections: Rise of Ferdinand Marcos ====
In April 1964, Senate President Ferdinand Marcos resigned from the Liberal Party and joined the Nacionalista ship. He cited President Macapagal's unfulfilled promise of not running for re-election as the main reason for leaving his former party. Before quitting his former party, Marcos served as its party president. Also, incumbent Vice President Pelaez sought nomination, but Marcos prevailed in the 1964 Convention, with controversies like coercion and massive vote buying. By selecting Quirino's former Vice President Fernando Lopez, also a former Liberal, as his running mate, Marcos defeated Macapagal in the three-way 1965 elections.

=== Marcos presidency: 1965–1986 ===
==== 1969 elections: Marcos retained ====
Tarlac Governor Ninoy Aquino, a former Nacionalista stalwart under Ramon Magsaysay and Marcos' frat mate, became a Liberal in 1959 and won a senate seat in 1967. Aquino became a vocal opponent of Marcos for the next decade.

Ramon Magsaysay's brother Genaro was recruited by the Liberal Party from the Nacionalista Party to be Serging Osmeña's running mate. Magsaysay won a senate seat as a Nacionalista in 1965. Marcos was reelected for a second term. He was the first and last Filipino president and Nacionalista president to win a second full term. His running mate, incumbent Vice President Lopez, was also elected to a third full term as vice president.

But Marcos's second term was characterized by social unrest, beginning with the 1969 Philippine balance of payments crisis, which was already underway during the second inauguration. Opposition groups began to form, with "moderate" groups calling for political reform and "radical" groups who espoused a more radical-left ideology.

==== 1971: The Plaza Miranda bombing ====
After what happened with the Plaza Miranda bombing, the Liberals won five seats, and the Nacionalistas won three seats by Eva Estrada Kalaw (also the Liberal's guest candidate), Ernie Maceda, and Alejandro Almendras.

In Marcos' 1971 State of the Nation Address, there is a sign in his speech that if the country's condition worsens, it is time to declare martial law.

So I come to speak of a society that is sick, so sick that it must either be cured and cured now or buried in a deluge of reforms.

— Ferdinand Marcos, 1971 State of the Nation Address titled The Democratic Revolution

Marcos also suspended the writ of habeas corpus by virtue of Proclamation No. 889, through which he assumed emergency powers.

Marcos's second term effectively ended a little under two years and nine months later, when Marcos announced on September 23, 1972, that he had placed the Philippines under martial law.

==== 1978 elections: Elections under Martial Law and Fourth Republic ====
For the incoming 1978 parliamentary elections, some Nacionalista members joined the Kilusang Bagong Lipunan (KBL), a regime-controlled coalition akin to the Japanese occupation's KALIBAPI. With many preferring not to be involved, the Nacionalistas went into hibernation.

==== 1981: Alejo Santos ====
With the lifting of Martial Law by Proclamation 2045 on January 17, 1981, Jose Roy was asked by Marcos to find an opponent against him, as Lakas ng Bayan (LABAN) and the United Nationalist Democratic Organization (UNIDO) declared a boycott on the election as early as April. As the opposition, UNIDO, the main opposition umbrella group, wanted to clean the voters' list, revamp the Commission on Elections, launch a nationwide campaign, and have them be accredited as a minority party. Marcos did not accept the demands, which led UNIDO to call for a boycott. This caused Marcos to be reportedly dismayed, as he could not legitimize the election without a viable opposition candidate.

The Nacionalista Party chose former Defense Secretary and Bulacan governor Alejo Santos as their standard bearer. Santos, who was appointed by Marcos as chairman of the board of the Philippine Veterans Bank, had Francisco Tatad, Marcos' former information minister, as his campaign manager. Ultimately, Marcos won in a landslide.

==== 1983: Together with UNIDO ====
After the assassination of their former member Ninoy Aquino, former Marcos loyalist and son of Jose P. Laurel, Salvador "Doy" Laurel led the Nacionalista to join UNIDO, thus becoming the main opposition against the dictatorship. Marcos called a snap election in 1986, thus giving Laurel a chance to be the face of the opposition to match Marcos. In the UNIDO convention with a jam-packed 25,000 delegates, Laurel had UNIDO's support, but unfortunately for him, Ninoy's spouse Cory, ran under her own campaign. Due to Manila Archbishop Jaime Sin's plea of sliding down for Laurel, he agreed, and the two teamed up.

==== 1986: Snap election ====
As the Nacionalista Party, Liberal Party, and PDP–Laban united under UNIDO, they fielded Cory Aquino and Doy Laurel as their official nominees for president and vice president, respectively, for the 1986 election. In the said election, violence was rampant, and cheating scandals and controversies arose, with COMELEC officers walking out of the PICC, the place where COMELEC transmission of data happens.

Lt. Col. Gringo Honasan, backed by former Defense Minister Juan Ponce Enrile, had plotted a coup d'état to seize Malacañang and kill Marcos and his family. It also gave way for the success of the People Power Revolution on February 25.

=== Corazon Aquino to Estrada's presidencies: 1986–2001 ===
==== Under first Aquino administration ====
Years later, in the late 1980s, the party was revived under the leadership of Laurel, who resigned as Secretary of Foreign Affairs due to conflict with President Cory Aquino.

Nacionalista logo from 1987 to 1991

==== 1992 elections ====
In preparation for the 1992 elections, in 1990, the party had three candidates to seek the presidential nomination. These are Vice President Laurel, businessman and Marcos crony Danding Cojuangco, and former Defense Minister and Senator Juan Ponce Enrile. Some of the Nacionalistas, including the son of their late stalwart Vicente Duterte, Rodrigo Duterte, said that Cojuangco is the strongest candidate, as the latter can grab the Solid North vote.

In the 1991 convention, the party nominated Laurel for president and selected Eva Kalaw to be his running mate. But after the party nomination, a pro-Danding Cojuangco/Marcos faction broke away and established the Nationalist People's Coalition led by Amang Rodriguez's son Isidro in 1991. The tandem of Laurel and Kalaw is in last place in that election All of the Nacionalistas who won seats in the lower house (House of Representatives) joined Jose De Venecia's Rainbow Coalition. The party almost returns to hibernation for the next few years, with Valenzuela congressman Antonio Serapio as its only member in both chambers of Congress.

=== Arroyo presidency: 2001–2010 ===
==== 2001 elections ====
Homobono Adaza, former Bureau of Immigration commissioner, was running under the Nacionalista banner. The party did not join either the People Power Coalition or Pwersa ng Masa. Adaza's platform was to make the Marcos family liable for their 600 million wealth question. But even though Adaza lost, in the House of Representatives, Nacionalista joined de Venecia's Sunshine Coalition.

Nacionalista Party logo used since 1991

==== 2003 ====
In 2003, Doy Laurel searched for the next leader of the party, and he saw former House Speaker and Senator Manny Villar. Villar at that time was an independent politician who was previously affiliated with Lakas and Estrada's LAMMP. He then tapped Villar as chairman. Laurel died in the United States in January 2004. Villar later assumed party presidency after the latter's death.

==== 2004 elections ====
Even though the party did not field any candidate in legislative and executive positions nationally, in 2004, the party, with the new leadership under its party chairman and president, Senator Villar, supported then-incumbent President Gloria Macapagal Arroyo, daughter of Diosdado Macapagal, who defeated their 1957 vice presidential candidate and stopped Carlos Garcia's reelection bid in 1961.

==== 2007 elections ====
For the 2007 elections, then-Senate President Villar led the Nacionalista into joining the opposition against Arroyo, the Genuine Opposition, to match the administration's TEAM Unity. But another re-electionist, Ralph Recto, moved away from the Nacionalista Party and joined with the admin camp. Villar pushed his re-election bid into victory.

Also, by 2007, the Kilusang Bagong Lipunan (KBL) is expected to merge with the party. KBL chairman Vicente Millora, who advocated a two-party system return, said the KBL is willing to merge with the Nacionalista Party if the two-party system is revived.

==== 2010 elections ====
In 2008, Manny Villar topped presidential surveys, despite the naked conflict of interest accusations at that time surrounding the C-5 Road extension project. In the same year, he declared that he intended to run for president in the 2010 Philippine presidential election. Until 2009, Villar still held the top spot in surveys for preferred presidential bets. But due to the death of former President Cory Aquino, her son, Senator Noynoy Aquino, began earning favor until finally surpassing him at around the tail end of the year. During the election period, both candidates had a tight race, with the popularity of Manny Villar's jingle for his presidential campaign, Naging Mahirap (or Nakaligo ka na ba sa Dagat ng Basura), prompting the creation of various memes on the internet. He also used the slogan Tapusin ang Kahirapan (Tagalog for "End Poverty").

===== Controversy over dominant minority status =====
In the 2010 general election, the Nacionalista and the Nationalist People's Coalition (NPC) formed an alliance after it was approved by the Commission on Elections (COMELEC) on April 12, 2010. Villar chose Senator Loren Legarda, who is a member of the NPC, as his running mate. This was formally approved by COMELEC through a resolution but on April 21, 2010, was blocked by the Supreme Court after a suit filed by an opposing party, the Liberal, calling the move a deliberate attempt at acquiring the dominant minority party status. On May 6, 2010, the Supreme Court nullified the merger, therefore making the Liberal the dominant minority party. It was based on a resolution by the COMELEC that political parties had to be registered and accredited prior to a cut-off date of August 17, 2009.

===== Senate slate =====
Villar organized the Senate slate of his ticket, composed of Pia Cayetano, Bongbong Marcos (who joined Nacionalista with his family due to a dispute with KBL members), Susan Ople, former Marine Colonel Ariel Querubin, former news reporter and congressman Gilbert Remulla, former military captain Ramon Mitra III, and Adel Tamano. They have also got Miriam Defensor Santiago of the People's Reform Party, Gwen Pimentel of PDP–Laban, activist Liza Maza, who is running independent, and Bayan Muna member and NDF member Satur Ocampo.

===== Cancelled alliance with KBL =====
On November 20, 2009, the Nacionalista forged an alliance with the KBL at the Laurel House in Mandaluyong. Bongbong Marcos was later on removed as a member by the KBL National Executive Committee on November 29. As such, the party broke its alliance with the KBL due to internal conflicts within the party, though Marcos remained part of the Nacionalista's senatorial line-up, and his family members were sworn in as members of the Nacionalista Party.

===== 'Villaroyo' rumors =====
At the start of the campaign for 2010, President Arroyo had a -53 trust rating. This resulted in low survey ratings for the standard bearer of the administration, then Defense Secretary Gilbert Teodoro. Rumors started to speculate that Manny Villar was a "secret candidate" of Arroyo, thus earning them both the "Villaroyo" title, combining their surnames respectively. Villar denied the accusation, and his ratings plummeted, with Joseph Estrada now placed second, surpassing him.

Furthermore, the reopening of the issue of the C-5 project affected his survey ratings, with Satur Ocampo, one of the members of his senate line-up, saying that he should face senate hearings about the issue.

Villar eventually lost to then-senator Noynoy Aquino, the son of former senator Ninoy Aquino and former president Corazon Aquino, while Legarda lost to Makati mayor Jejomar Binay.

=== Noynoy Aquino to Rodrigo Duterte's presidency: 2010–2022 ===
==== 2013 ====
Nacionalista forged a coalition with the Liberal Party, Nationalist People's Coalition (NPC), Sonny Angara's Laban ng Demokratikong Pilipino, Risa Hontiveros' Akbayan, and Magdalo led by Antonio Trillanes, who is also a Nacionalista member. The coalition became the Team PNoy. Nacionalista members fielded are Trillanes, Villar's wife Cynthia, and Alan Peter Cayetano. The three won seats in the senate.

==== 2016 ====
On an April 2015 cruise from Manila to Japan, the Nacionalista Party were supposed to decide on their plans for 2016. However, they were not able to form a consensus on what to do. In May, Cynthia Villar said that they are considering adopting Grace Poe as their candidate. By July, Trillanes said that it is possible, but not with the inclusion of Chiz Escudero, her running mate. By September, she said that if Rodrigo Duterte decides to run for the presidency, the Nacionalistas might support him.

By 2016, Alan Peter Cayetano, Bongbong Marcos, and Antonio Trillanes originally aspired to get the Nacionalista's nomination for the presidency. But the three ran as candidates for vice president instead, and when PDP–Laban's Rodrigo Duterte substituted Martin Diño, the three sought to be selected as Duterte's running mate, with Cayetano being the one picked in November. At first, Cayetano was originally proposed by Mar Roxas' campaign team to be the latter's running mate. However, the Liberal Party decided to pick then-representative Leni Robredo, the widow of former Interior Secretary Jesse Robredo, as Roxas' running mate instead. On the other hand, Marcos was tapped by Miriam Defensor Santiago as her running mate in October 2015.

With multiple members angling for the vice presidency, Cynthia Villar said that the party wouldn't impose a stance on whom to support for the presidency if two or more members were to run for the vice presidency. Duterte won, but Cayetano only finished third, with Marcos as second.

In 2022, while campaigning for Isko Moreno, a former Nacionalista, Duterte's former strategist Lito Banayo revealed that Duterte originally planned to run under the Nacionalista banner, but due to Cayetano, Marcos, and Trillanes' ambition, he jumped to PDP–Laban, Cory Aquino's former party.

==== 2019 ====
Nacionalista fielded re-electionist Cynthia Villar and Bongbong's older sister, Ilocos Norte Governor Imee Marcos, to be senatorial candidates under the Hugpong ng Pagbabago. Both senators won.

==== 2022 ====
In late 2021, Bongbong Marcos left the Nacionalista Party and joined Partido Federal ng Pilipinas to start his presidential bid.

In October of the same year, one of its top officials, Senator Ralph Recto, endorsed Manila Mayor Isko Moreno's presidential run, as he stated that Nacionalista members are open to endorsing any candidate and did not have any unified endorsement.

But before May 2022, Manny Villar endorsed the tandem of Bongbong Marcos and presidential daughter Sara Duterte. Despite this, Recto stuck to supporting Moreno.

=== Bongbong Marcos' presidency: 2022–present ===
==== 2025 ====
In 2024, the Nacionalista Party forged an alliance with the Partido Federal ng Pilipinas (PFP) and joined the Alyansa para sa Bagong Pilipinas coalition alongside PFP, NPC, and NUP. Nacionalista fielded Pia Cayetano, Camille Villar, Imee Marcos, and Ariel Querubin as candidates, but Marcos initially declined coalition membership and endorsement from her younger brother, President Bongbong Marcos, and Querubin later chose to run under the Riding-in-tandem Team alongside independent Bonifacio Bosita. In February 2025, during the campaign, Marcos appeared with the coalition and was reintroduced by her brother. However, she left Alyansa for good on March 26, citing reasons based on the arrest of former President Duterte. Villar and Marcos were later endorsed by Vice President Sara Duterte.

== Nacionalista presidents ==
As of 2026, there have been a total of 5 Nacionalista presidents. Those who won the presidency under other parties are not included.

#	Name (lifespan)	Portrait	Province	Presidency start date	Presidency end date	Time in office
2	Manuel Quezon (1878– 1944)		Tayabas	November 15, 1935	August 1, 1944 (Note: Died in office.)	8 years, 260 days
4	Sergio Osmeña (1878–1961)		Cebu	August 1, 1944	May 28, 1946	1 year, 323 days
7	Ramon Magsaysay (1907–1957)		Zambales	December 30, 1953	March 17, 1957	3 years, 77 days
8	Carlos P. Garcia (1896–1971)		Bohol	March 18, 1957	December 30, 1961	4 years, 316 days
10	Ferdinand Marcos (1917–1989)		Ilocos Norte	December 30, 1965	September 21, 1972 (Note: After the declaration of Martial Law, political parties melted. Marcos left Nacionalista to form Kilusang Bagong Lipunan in 1978.)	6 years, 286 days

== Electoral performance ==
=== Presidential elections ===
Year	Candidate	Votes	%	Result	Outcome
1935	Manuel L. Quezon	695,332	67.99	Won	Manuel L. Quezon won
1941	Manuel L. Quezon	1,340,320	81.78	Won	Manuel L. Quezon won
1946	Sergio Osmeña	1,129,996	45.71	Lost	Manuel Roxas (Liberal) won
1949	José P. Laurel	1,318,330	37.22	Lost	Elpidio Quirino (Liberal) won
1953	Ramon Magsaysay	2,912,992	68.90	Won	Ramon Magsaysay won
1957	Carlos P. Garcia	2,072,257	41.28	Won	Carlos P. Garcia won
1961	Carlos P. Garcia	2,902,996	44.95	Lost	Diosdado Macapagal (Liberal) won
1965	Ferdinand Marcos	3,861,324	51.94	Won	Ferdinand Marcos won
1969	Ferdinand Marcos	5,017,343	61.47	Won	Ferdinand Marcos won
1981	Alejo Santos	1,716,449	8.25	Lost	Ferdinand Marcos (KBL) won
1986	None; Laurel's running mate was Corazon Aquino (UNIDO)	9,291,716	46.10	Disputed	Corazon Aquino (UNIDO) assumed presidency
1992	Salvador Laurel	770,046	3.40	Lost	Fidel V. Ramos (Lakas–NUCD) won
1998	None			—N/a	Joseph Estrada (LAMMP) won
2004	None; endorsed Gloria Macapagal Arroyo (Lakas–CMD)			—N/a	Gloria Macapagal Arroyo (Lakas–CMD) won
2010	Manuel Villar	5,573,835	15.42	Lost	Benigno Aquino III (Liberal) won
2016	None			—N/a	Rodrigo Duterte (PDP–Laban) won
2022	None; endorsed Bongbong Marcos (PFP)			—N/a	Bongbong Marcos (PFP) won

=== Vice presidential elections ===
Year	Candidate	Votes	%	Result	Outcome
1935	Sergio Osmeña	812,352	86.93	Won	Sergio Osmeña won
1941	Sergio Osmeña	1,445,897	92.10	Won	Sergio Osmeña won
1946	Eulogio Rodriguez	1,051,243	47.38	Lost	Elpidio Quirino (Liberal) won
1949	Manuel Briones	1,184,215	46.08	Lost	Fernando López (Liberal) won
1953	Carlos P. Garcia	2,515,265	62.90	Won	Carlos P. Garcia won
1957	José Laurel Jr.	1,783,012	37.91	Lost	Diosdado Macapagal (Liberal) won
1961	Gil Puyat	1,787,987	28.06	Lost	Emmanuel Pelaez (Liberal) won
1965	Fernando López	3,531,550	48.48	Won	Fernando López won
1969	Fernando López	5,001,737	62.75	Won	Fernando López won
1986	Salvador Laurel (Note: Laurel stood under the banner of the multi-party electoral alliance UNIDO.)	9,173,105	45.85	Disputed	Salvador Laurel assumed vice presidency
1992	Eva Estrada Kalaw	255,730	1.25	Lost	Joseph Estrada (NPC) won
1998	None			—N/a	Gloria Macapagal Arroyo (Lakas–NUCD–UMDP) won
2004	None; endorsed Noli de Castro (Independent)			—N/a	Noli de Castro (Independent) won
2010	None; Villar's running mate was Loren Legarda (NPC)	14,645,574	41.65	Lost	Jejomar Binay (PDP–Laban) won
2016	None (Note: Nacionalista Party members Alan Peter Cayetano, Bongbong Marcos and Antonio Trillanes stood as independent candidates without the party's endorsement; all lost.)			—N/a	Leni Robredo (Liberal) won
2022	None; endorsed Sara Duterte (Lakas–CMD)			—N/a	Sara Duterte (Lakas–CMD) won

=== Legislative elections ===
==== Philippine Assembly ====
Year	Votes	%	Seats	+/–	Result
1907	34,277	35.71	32 / 80	N/A	Won
1909	92,996	48.19	62 / 81	▲30	Won
1912	124,753	53.35	62 / 81	Steady	Won

==== 1916–1935 ====
In 1916, the House of Representatives was still called the Philippine Assembly.

Senate elections	Senate Seats won	+/–	Result	House / Assembly election	House Seats won	±	Result
1916	22 / 24	N/A	Won	1916	75 / 90	▲13	Won
1919	9 / 11	Steady	Won	1919	83 / 90	▼5	Won
1922	8 / 11	▼5	Split	1922	64 / 93	▼19	Split
1925	7 / 11	▼4	Won	1925	64 / 92	Steady	Won
1928	9 / 11	▲5	Won	1928	71 / 94	▲7	Won
1931	7 / 11	▼1	Won	1931	68 / 86	▼3	Won
1934	11 / 11	▼1	Won	1934	89 / 92	▲21	Split

==== Philippine Assembly ====
Year	Votes	%	Seats	+/–	Result
1907	34,277	35.71	32 / 80	N/A	Won
1909	92,996	48.19	62 / 81	▲30	Won
1912	124,753	53.35	62 / 81	Steady	Won
1916	#	%	75 / 90	▲13	Won

==== National Assembly (1935–1941) ====
Year	Votes	%	Seats	+/–	Result
1935	#	%	83 / 89	▼1	Won
1938	#	%	98 / 98	▲15	Won

==== National Assembly (1943–1944) ====
Year	Votes	%	Seats	+/–	Result
1943	Did not participate			N/A	—

==== 1941–1971: Bicamercal Commonwealth to Third Republic ====
The Senate was abolished from 1935 until 1941.

Senate elections	Senate seats	+/–	Result	President	Result	+/–	House seats	House elections
1941	24 / 24	N/A	Won	Manuel Quezon	Won	▼3	95 / 98	1941
1946	6 / 16	▼3	Lost	Manuel Roxas	Lost	▼60	35 / 98	1946
1947	2 / 8	▼4	Lost	Manuel Roxas	Lost	▼60	35 / 98	1946
1949	0 / 8	▼4	Lost	Elpidio Quirino	Lost	▼2	33 / 100	1949
1951	9 / 9	▲8	Won	Elpidio Quirino	Lost	▼2	33 / 100	1949
1953	5 / 8	▲2	Won	Ramon Magsaysay	Won	▼2	31 / 102	1953
1955	9 / 9	▲6	Won	Ramon Magsaysay	Won	▼2	31 / 102	1953
1957	6 / 8	▼1	Won	Carlos P. Garcia	Won	▲51	82 / 102	1957
1959	5 / 8	▼1	Won	Carlos P. Garcia	Won	▲51	82 / 102	1957
1961	2 / 8	▼4	Lost	Diosdado Macapagal	Won	▼8	74 / 104	1961
1963	4 / 8	▼2	Majority	Diosdado Macapagal	Won	▼8	74 / 104	1961
1965	5 / 8	▲1	Won	Ferdinand E. Marcos	Lost	▼36	38 / 104	1965
1967	6 / 8	▲4	Won	Ferdinand E. Marcos	Lost	▼36	38 / 104	1965
1969	6 / 8	▲2	Won	Ferdinand E. Marcos	Won	▲50	88 / 110	1969
1971	3 / 8	▼1	Won	Ferdinand E. Marcos	Won	▲50	88 / 110	1969

==== 1987–present ====
Senate election	Senate Seats won		Result	House elections	House Seats won	+/–	Result
1987	Participated under Grand Alliance for Democracy	N/A	Minority	1987	4 / 200	▲2	Minority
1992	0 / 24	▼2	Lost	1992	7 / 200	▲3	Majority
1995	Did not participate	Steady	—	1995	1 / 204	▼6	Majority
1998	Did not participate	Steady	—	1998	0 / 258	▼1	Lost
2001	0 / 24	Steady	Lost	2001	Did not participate	Steady	—
2004	Did not participate	Steady	—	2004	2 / 261	▲2	Majority
2007	3 / 24	▲3	Majority	2007	11 / 270	▲9	Majority
2010	4 / 24	▲1	Split	2010	25 / 286	▲14	Split
2013	5 / 24	▲1	Majority	2013	10 / 292	▼15	Majority
2016	3 / 24	▼2	Split	2016	24 / 297	▲14	Majority
2019	4 / 24	▲1	Majority	2019	42 / 304	▲18	Majority
2022	4 / 24	Steady	Split	2022	36 / 316	▼6	Split
2025	4 / 24	0	Split	2025	21 / 317	▼15	Split

== Independent Nacionalista ==
"Independent Nacionalista," or denoted as "Nacionalista (independent)" on candidate lists, refers to politicians who had aligned themselves with the Nacionalista Party but did not win its nomination or run under its label. This term was used during the Third Philippine Republic, which had a two-party system. In the current Fifth Republic and under the multi-party system, candidates are no longer identified in this manner.

== Notable Nacionalistas ==
=== Past ===
Throughout their careers, many of the country's politicians, statesmen, and leaders were, in whole or in part, Nacionalistas. Notable names include the following:

Presidents

- Manuel L. Quezon (2nd President)
- José P. Laurel (3rd President)
- Sergio Osmeña (4th President)
- Manuel Roxas (5th President, won as Liberal)
- Elpidio Quirino (6th President, won as Liberal)
- Ramon Magsaysay (7th President)
- Carlos P. Garcia (8th President)
- Ferdinand Marcos (10th President)
- Joseph Estrada (13th President, as PMP)
- Rodrigo Duterte (16th President, won as PDP)
- Bongbong Marcos (17th President, won as PFP)

Vice Presidents

- Fernando Lopez (3rd and 7th vice president under Elpidio Quirino and Ferdinand Marcos)
- Emmanuel Pelaez (6th vice president under Diosdado Macapagal)
- Salvador Laurel (8th vice president and 5th and last prime minister under President Corazon Aquino)

Senators

- Antonio de las Alas
- Juan B. Alegre
- Alejandro Almendras
- Alauya Alonto
- Domocao Alonto
- Jose Altavas
- Magnolia Antonino
- Melecio Arranz
- José María Arroyo
- Benigno Aquino Sr.
- José Avelino
- Dominador Aytona
- Sotero Baluyut
- Antonio Belo
- Helena Z. Benitez
- Manuel Briones
- Nicolas Buendia
- Hadji Butu
- Tomas Cabili
- Aquilino Calvo
- Manuel Camus
- Nicolás Capistrano
- Alan Peter Cayetano
- Edmundo B. Cea
- José Clarín
- Hermogenes Concepcion
- Tomás Confesor
- Mariano Jesús Cuenco
- Alejandro de Guzmán
- Bernabé de Guzmán
- Ceferino de Leon
- Miriam Defensor-Santiago
- Francisco Afan Delgado
- Vicente de Vera
- Jose W. Diokno
- Ramón Diokno
- Francisco Enage
- Juan Ponce Enrile
- Rene Espina
- Eva Estrada-Kalaw
- Ramon J. Fernandez
- Santiago Fonacier
- José Fuentebella
- Isauro Gabaldón
- Juan Gaerlan
- Troadio Galicano
- Rodolfo Ganzon
- Tomás Gómez
- Matías González
- Espiridión Guanco
- Mario Guariña
- Pedro Guevara
- Pedro Hernaez
- Ludovico Hidrosollo
- Domingo Imperial
- Leoncio Imperial
- Isaac Lacson
- Wenceslao Lagumbay
- Sotero Laurel
- Jose Ledesma
- Oscar Ledesma
- Roseller T. Lim
- Francisco Tongio Liongson
- José Locsín
- Manuel López
- Joaquin Luna
- Alejo Mabanag
- Ernesto Maceda
- Pacita Madrigal-Warns
- Vicente Madrigal
- Genaro Magsaysay
- Gil Montilla
- Ruperto Montinola
- Juan Nolasco
- Blas Ople
- Camilo Osías
- José Ozámiz
- Rafael Palma
- Quintín Paredes
- Leonardo B. Perez
- Cipriano Primicias Sr.
- Koko Pimentel
- Gil Puyat
- Vicente Rama
- Esteban de la Rama
- Claro M. Recto
- Ralph Recto
- Isabelo de los Reyes
- Francisco Soc Rodrigo
- Celestino Rodriguez
- Eulogio Rodriguez
- Pedro Rodríguez
- José E. Romero
- Decoroso Rosales
- Jose J. Roy
- Pedro Sabido
- Pastor Salazar
- Lope K. Santos
- Proceso Sebastian
- Esteban Singson
- Balabaran Sinsuat
- Pedro María Sison
- Teófilo Sison
- Antero Soriano
- Francisco Soriano
- Filemon Sotto
- Juan Sumulong
- Lorenzo Sumulong
- Mamintal A.J. Tamano
- Emiliano Tria Tirona
- Potenciano Treñas
- Antonio Trillanes
- Juan Torralba
- Arturo Tolentino
- Ramon Torres
- Jose Maria Veloso
- Jose O. Vera
- Juan Villamor
- Francisco Felipe Villanueva
- Hermenegildo Villanueva
- José Yulo
- Mariano Yulo
- Francisco Zulueta
- Jose Zulueta

=== Others ===
- Carlos M. Padilla (former Representative of the Lone District of Nueva Vizcaya and Governor of Nueva Vizcaya)
- Roque Ablan Jr. (former Representative of Ilocos Norte's 1st District)
- Norberto S. Amoranto (5th Mayor of Quezon City)
- Galicano Apacible (former Governor of Batangas)
- Benigno "Ninoy" Aquino Jr. (former Governor of Tarlac, became Senator under the Nacionalista's rival Liberal)
- Jose Aspiras (former Representative of La Union's 2nd District)
- Sergio Bayan (former Mayor of Baguio)
- Fortunato Borbon (former Governor of Batangas)
- Pablo Borbon (former Governor of Batangas)
- Bartolome C. Cabangbang (former Representative of Bohol's 2nd district)
- Vicente J. Caedo (former Governor of Batangas)
- Marc Douglas Cagas IV (former Governor of Davao del Sur)
- Antonio Carpio (former Governor of Batangas)
- Costancio Castañeda (former Representative of Tarlac's 2nd district)
- Modesto Castillo (former Governor of Batangas)
- Eduardo Cojuangco Jr. (former Representative of Tarlac's 1st district and Governor of Tarlac)
- Pablo Cuneta (former Mayor of Pasay)
- Jose Delgado (former Governor and Mayor of Cebu )
- Antonio Diaz (former Representative of Zambales' Lone district)
- Vicente Duterte (former Governor of Davao)
- Nicolas Gonzales (former Governor of Batangas)
- León Guinto (former Governor of Quezon(Tayabas) and 11th Mayor of Manila)
- Eduardo Gullas (former Representative of Cebu's 1st District and Governor of Cebu)
- Adriano Hernández y Dayot (former Governor of Iloilo)
- Maximo Malvar (former Governor of Batangas)
- Placido L. Mapa (former Mayor of Baguio)
- Ramon P. Mitra (former Mayor of Baguio)
- Francisco "Isko" Moreno Domagoso (27th Mayor of Manila, was a member of Nacionalista during his term as Vice Mayor from 2010 to 2013)
- Vicente Noble (former Governor of Batangas)
- Juan G. Nolasco (9th Mayor of Manila)
- Arsenio Lacson (15th Mayor of Manila)
- Luis L. Lardizabal (former Mayor of Baguio)
- Jose Laurel Jr. (9th Speaker of the House of Representatives of the Philippines and Representative of Batangas' 3rd district)
- Jose Laurel IV (former Representative of Batangas's 3rd district)
- Feliciano Leviste (former Governor of Batangas)
- Elias B. Lopez (former Mayor of Davao City)
- Vicente Lukbán (former Governor of Tayabas)
- Mariano Melendres (5th Governor of Rizal)
- Carmen Planas (former Vice Mayor of Manila)
- Miguel Raffiñan (former Representative of Cebu's 6th District and Mayor of Cebu City)
- Francisco Remotigue (former Governor of Cebu)
- Osmundo Rama (former Governor of Cebu)
- Jonvic Remulla (Incumbent Governor of Cavite, was a member of Nacionalista during his first term)
- Benjamin Romualdez (former Governor of Leyte)
- Adelina Santos Rodriguez (6th Mayor of Quezon City)
- Isidro Rodriguez (16th Governor of Rizal)
- Jose V. Rodriguez (former Representative of Cebu's 7th District and Mayor of Cebu City)
- Ignacio Santiago Sr. (former Governor of Bulacan)
- Alejo Santos (World War II Veteran, former Representative of Bulacan's 2nd District and former Governor of Bulacan
- Pablo Gomez Sarino (former Mayor of Bacoor, Cavite, was a member of Nacionalista as a municipal councilor)
- Isidro Siapno (former Mayor of Baguio)
- Chavit Singson (former Governor of Ilocos Sur and Mayor of Narvacan)
- Manuel C. Sotto (former Vice Mayor of Davao City)
- Alfonso Tabora (former Mayor of Baguio)
- Nicasio S. Valderossa (former Mayor of Baguio)
- Pío Valenzuela (former Governor of Bulacan)
- Braulio de Villa (former Governor of Batangas)
- Nemesio Yabut (7th Mayor of Makati)
- Bienvenido R. Yandoc (former Mayor of Baguio)
- Casimiro Ynares Jr. (18th & 20th Governor of Rizal, was a member of Nacionalista during his terms as Mayor of Binangonan)

Most of these individuals embody solid political traditions of economic and political nationalism that are pertinent today, even with the party's subsequent decline.

=== Current party officials ===
Some members of the House of Representatives and Senate include—but are not limited to—the following:

- Manuel Villar (former Senate President), Party President
- Cynthia Villar (former Senator), Party Chairman
- Mark Aguilar Villar (current Senator) Secretary-General
- Jose Espinosa III (former Mayor of Iloilo City) Nacionalista Chairman of Iloilo City
- Robert "Ace" Barbers (current Representative from Surigao del Norte), Spokesperson
- Imee Marcos (current Senator)
- Matthew Marcos Manotoc (current Vice Governor of Ilocos Norte)
- Emmylou Taliño-Mendoza (current Governor of Cotabato)
- Jose I. Tejada (current Representative from North Cotabato)

== Nacionalista-affiliated parties ==
- PDP–Laban (until 2024)
- Laban ng Demokratikong Pilipino
- Lakas–CMD
- National Unity Party
  - United Bangsamoro Justice Party
- People's Reform Party
- Alyansa – Davao del Sur and Davao Occidental
- Alayon – Cebu
- Bileg- Ilocos Sur
- Kugi Uswag Sugbo – Cebu City
- Partido Magdalo – Cavite
- PaDayon Pilipino – Misamis Oriental and Cagayan de Oro
- Paglaum Party- Negros Occidental
- Fuerza Zamboanga – Zamboanga City
- One Batangas – Batangas

== Candidates for Philippine general elections ==
=== 2010 ===
==== Presidential ticket ====
- Manuel Villar – presidential candidate (lost)
- Loren Legarda – vice presidential candidate (lost)

==== For senator ====
- Pia Cayetano (won)
- Bongbong Marcos (won)
- Liza Maza (lost)
- Ramon Mitra III (lost)
- Satur Ocampo (lost)
- Susan Ople (lost)
- Gwen Pimentel (lost)
- Ariel Querubin (lost)
- Gilbert Remulla (lost)
- Adel Tamano (lost)
- Miriam Defensor Santiago (won)

=== 2013 ===
==== For senator ====
All members ran under the administration coalition, Team PNoy.

- Cynthia Villar (won)
- Alan Peter Cayetano (won)
- Antonio Trillanes (won)

=== 2016 ===
2016 Philippine general election
Vice presidential candidates from Nacionalista but ran as independents
Candidate	Alliance	Votes	Percentage	Elected?
Bongbong Marcos	PRP	14,155,344	34.47%	No
Alan Peter Cayetano	PDP–Laban	5,903,379	14.38%	No
Antonio Trillanes	None	868,501	2.11%	No
Senatorial candidates under Nacionalista
Candidate	Alliance	Votes	Percentage	Elected?
Susan Ople	PGP (Note: Guest candidate under the People's Reform Party and the United Nationalist Alliance)	2,775,191	6.17%	No

=== 2019 ===
2019 Philippine general election
Senatorial candidates under Nacionalista
Candidate	Alliance	Votes	Percentage	Elected?
Cynthia Villar	HNP	25,283,727	53.46%	Yes
Pia Cayetano	HNP	19,789,019	41.84%	Yes
Imee Marcos	HNP	15,882,628	33.58%	Yes

=== 2022 ===
2022 Philippine general election
Senatorial candidates under Nacionalista
Candidate	Alliance	Votes	Percentage	Elected?
Mark Villar	UniTeam (Note: Guest candidate under Tuloy ang Pagbabago)	19,475,592	35.06%	Yes

=== 2025 ===
2025 Philippine general election
Senatorial candidates under Nacionalista
Candidate	Alliance	Votes	Percentage	Elected?
Pia Cayetano	Alyansa	14,573,430	25.41	Yes
Camille Villar	Alyansa (Note: Guest candidate under DuterTen)	13,339,227	23.80%	Yes
Imee Marcos	None	13,651,274	23.35%	Yes
Ariel Querubin	Riding-in-Tandem Team	3,950,051	6.89%	No

== 20th Congress Members ==
All members are as of April 2, 2026

=== Senate of the Philippines ===
Senators from Nacionalista
Senator	Bloc	Took office	Will leave office	Eligible for re-election?
Pia Cayetano	Majority	June 30, 2019	June 30, 2031	No
Imee Marcos	Minority	June 30, 2019	June 30, 2031	No
Camille Villar	Majority	June 30, 2025	June 30, 2031	Yes
Mark Villar	Majority	June 30, 2022	June 30, 2028	Yes

=== House of Representatives of the Philippines ===
District representatives from Nacionalista
Representative	Congressional District	Bloc	Took office	Will leave office	Eligible for re-election?
Caloy Bolilia	Batangas-4th	Majority	June 30, 2025	June 30, 2028	Yes
Beverley Dimacuha	Batangas-5th	Majority	June 30, 2025	June 30, 2028	Yes
Ryan Recto	Batangas-6th	Majority	June 30, 2025	June 30, 2028	Yes
Laarni Roque	Bukidnon-4th	Majority	June 30, 2022	June 30, 2028	Yes
Oscar Malapitan	Caloocan-1st	Majority	June 30, 2022	June 30, 2028	Yes
Rudy Caoagdan	Cotabato-2nd	Majority	June 30, 2019	June 30, 2028	No
Angelo Barba	Ilocos Norte-2nd	Majority	June 30, 2019	June 30, 2028	No
Ferjenel Biron	Iloilo-4th	Majority	June 30, 2022	June 30, 2028	Yes
Jason Almonte	Misamis Occidental-1st	Majority	June 30, 2022	June 30, 2028	Yes
Yevgeny Emano	Misamis Oriental-2nd	Majority	June 30, 2022	June 30, 2028	Yes
Maximo Dalog Jr.	Mountain Province at-large	Majority	June 30, 2019	June 30, 2028	No
Arthur Celeste	Pangasinan-1st	Majority	June 30, 2022	June 30, 2028	Yes
Eleandro Jesus Madrona	Romblon at-large	Majority	June 30, 2022	June 30, 2028	Yes
Stephen James Tan	Samar-1st	Minority	June 30, 2022	June 30, 2028	Yes
Bernadette Barbers	Surigao del Norte-2nd	Majority	June 30, 2025	June 30, 2028	Yes
Romeo Momo	Surigao del Sur-1st	Majority	June 30, 2022	June 30, 2028	Yes
Ading Cruz	Taguig–Pateros-1st	Majority	June 30, 2022	June 30, 2028	Yes
Jorge Daniel Bocobo	Taguig–Pateros-2nd	Majority	June 30, 2025	June 30, 2028	Yes

== Nacionalista Party presidents ==
No.	Picture	Name	Start of term	End of term
1.		Sergio Osmeña	1907	1935
2.		Manuel L. Quezon	1935	1944
3.		Sergio Osmeña	1944	1953
4.		Eulogio Rodriguez	1953	1964
5.		Gil Puyat	1964	1970
6.		Jose Roy	1970	1986
7.		Salvador Laurel	1986	2003
8.		Manny Villar	2003	Incumbent

== See also ==
- Filipino nationalism
- List of political parties in the Philippines
- Liberal Party (Philippines)
- Progressive Party (Philippines)
- Nationalist People's Coalition
