= Camilo Osías =

President of the Senate of the Philippines in 1952 and 1953

The Honorable Camilo Osías
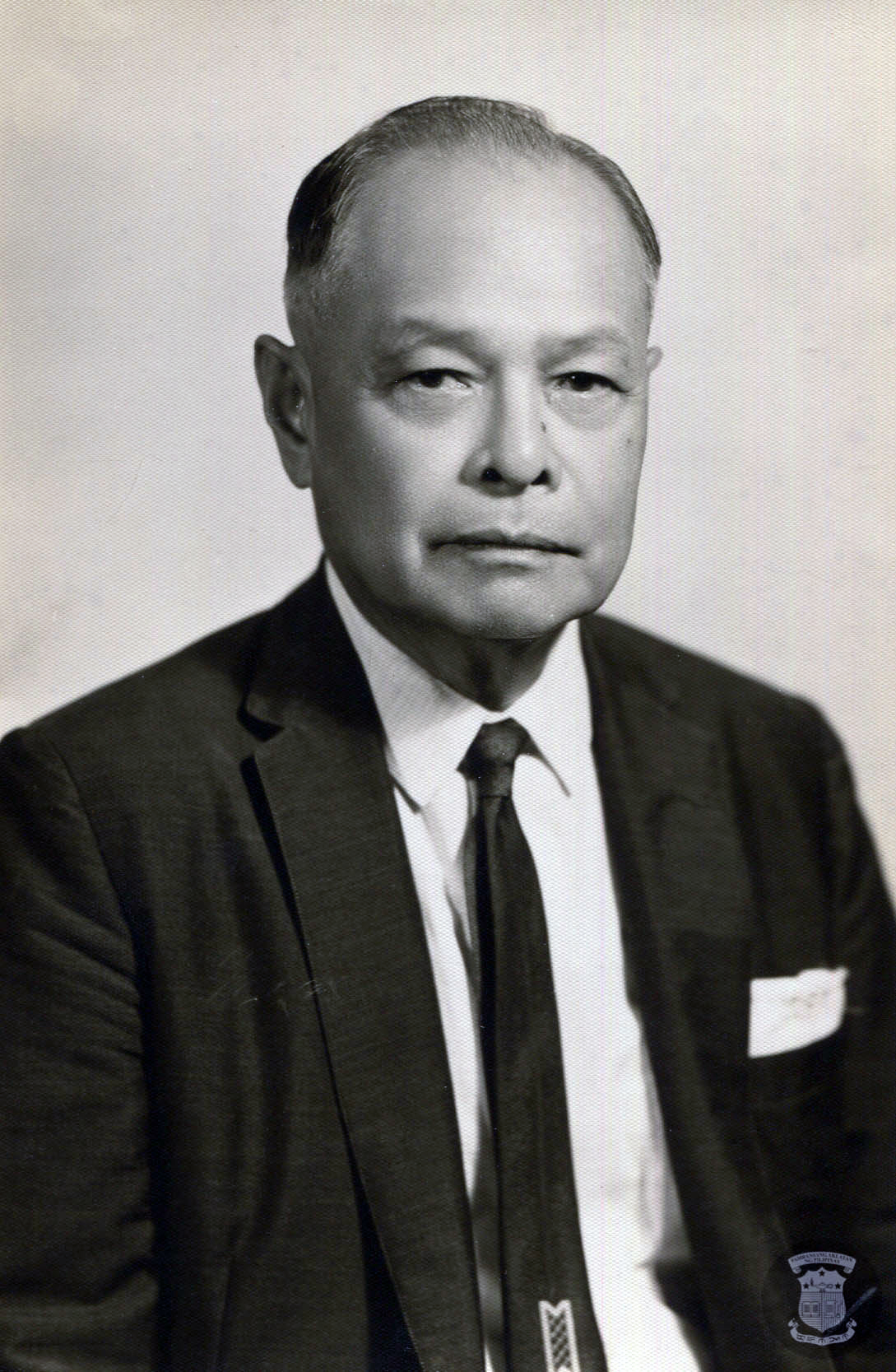

6th & 8th President of the Senate of the Philippines
- In office April 17, 1953 – April 30, 1953
- Preceded by: Eulogio Rodriguez
- Succeeded by: Jose Zulueta
- In office April 17, 1952 – April 30, 1952
- Preceded by: Quintín Paredes
- Succeeded by: Eulogio Rodriguez

President pro tempore of the Senate of the Philippines
- In office January 26, 1967 – December 30, 1967
- Preceded by: Lorenzo Sumulong
- Succeeded by: Jose Roy

Senator of the Philippines
- In office December 30, 1947 – December 30, 1953
- In office December 30, 1961 – December 30, 1967
- In office 1925–1929 Serving with Alejo Mabanag (1925-1928); Teofilo Sison (1928-1929)
- Preceded by: Bernabé de Guzmán
- Succeeded by: Alejandro de Guzmán
- Constituency: 2nd district

18th Minister of Education
- In office May 18, 1944 – February 27, 1945
- President: José P. Laurel
- Preceded by: Gabriel Mañalac (as Minister of Education, Health and Public Welfare)
- Succeeded by: Carlos P. Romulo (as Secretary of Information and Public Relations)

Member of the Philippine National Assembly from La Union's 1st district
- In office November 15, 1935 – 1938
- Preceded by: Francisco Ortega
- Succeeded by: Delfin Flores

Resident Commissioner to the U.S. House of Representatives from the Philippine Islands
- In office March 4, 1929 – January 3, 1935 Serving with Pedro Guevara
- Preceded by: Isauro Gabaldon
- Succeeded by: Francisco A. Delgado

Personal details
- Born: Camilo Osías y Olaviano; March 23, 1889 Balaoan, La Union, Captaincy General of the Philippines
- Died: May 20, 1976 (aged 87) Manila, Philippines
- Resting place: Loyola Memorial Park, Marikina
- Party: Liberal (1953–1976)
- Other political affiliations: KALIBAPI (1942–1945); Nacionalista (1925–1942; 1947–1953)
- Spouses: Ildefonza Cuaresma (m. 1914; div. 1939); Avelina Lorenzana
- Children: 7
- Education: University of Chicago; Western Illinois University; Columbia University

Camilo Osías y Olaviano (March 23, 1889 – May 20, 1976), was a Filipino politician, twice for a short time President of the Senate of the Philippines. Along with American Mary A. Lane, Osías translated into English the poem Filipinas that was set to the Marcha Nacional Filipina, producing the Philippine Hymn, now the national anthem Lupang Hinirang. Until June 2026, Osías held the record for the second-shortest total tenure as Senate President at 26 days due to party changes after the war in 1952-1953, with each term lasting 13 days, making either the shortest single term in history.

== Biography ==
=== Early life and education ===
Osías attended school in Balaoan, Vigan and San Fernando, and was selected a government scholar to the United States in 1905. He studied at the University of Chicago in 1906 and 1907. He graduated from the Western Illinois State Teachers College at Macomb, Illinois in 1908, and from the Teachers College of Columbia University in New York City in 1910.

=== Early career ===
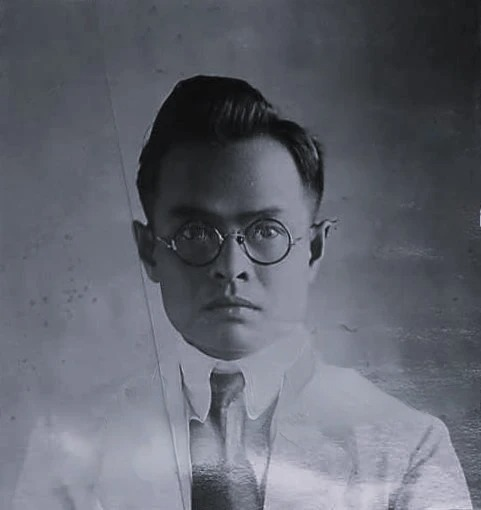
Osías in 1923

On his return to the Philippines, he taught and later assumed various administrative positions, particularly in the field of education. He successively became the first Filipino Superintendent of Schools (1915 to 1916), Assistant Director of Education (1917 to 1921), a lecturer at the University of the Philippines (1919 to 1921), and President of National University (1921–1936), a private institution.

=== Political career ===
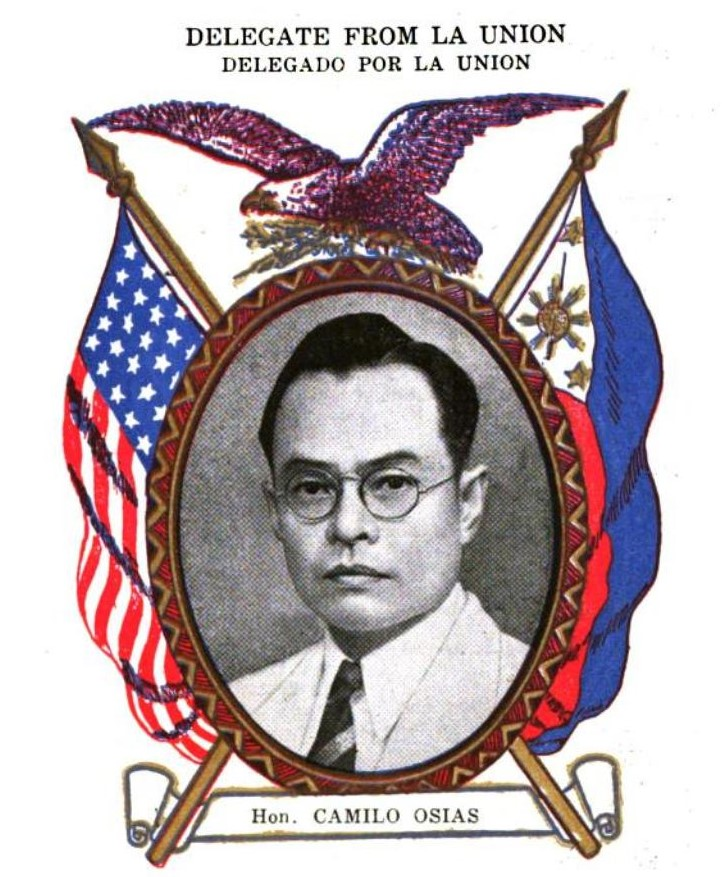
Osías as a delegate to the Philippine Constitutional Convention, published by Benipayo Press (c. 1935)

Osías then entered national politics. He was a member of the first Philippine mission to the United States from 1919 to 1920. He was elected to the Philippine Senate in 1925, and as a Nacionalista, until he resigned to become a Resident Commissioner in the United States House of Representatives in 1929. He was reelected as Resident Commissioner in 1931 and served until January 3, 1935, when his term expired in accordance with the new government of the Philippine Commonwealth. In 1934, he was an unsuccessful candidate for election to the Philippine Senate, but became a member of the Constitutional Convention in 1934, and a member of the first National Assembly for La Union's 1st district in 1935. In 1939, he was a member of the Economic Mission to the United States, and chairman of the Educational Mission between 1938 and 1941.

Back in the Philippines, Osías became chairman of the National Council of Education in 1941, Director of Publicity and Propaganda until January 1942, chairman of the National Cooperative Administration in 1941, later Assistant Commissioner of the Ministry of Education, Health, and Public Welfare, then Minister of Education until 1945. He was also Chancellor of Osías Colleges. He was elected again to the Philippine Senate in 1947 for a term expiring in 1953. He served two brief terms as President of the Senate of the Philippines (in 1952 and 1953), both of which began with the ouster of his predecessor and ended with his own. His first stint from April 17 to 30, 1952, remains the shortest term for a Senate President in the history of the chamber to date. He was the Philippines' representative to the Inter-Parliamentary Union in Rome and to the International Trade Conference in Genoa in 1948. He ran for reelection in 1953, but lost and again in 1955. He was elected again, this time as a Liberal to the Philippine Senate (1961–1967), and served as president pro tempore. He was a resident of Mandaluyong, Rizal (since incorporated into Metro Manila), until his death.

=== Presidential nomination ===
On April 12, 1953, Osias, being a prominent figure in the Nacionalista Party, lost the presidential nomination to Ramon Magsaysay at the Nacionalista Convention. Despite his experience and contributions to the party, Osias faced challenges due to his religious affiliation, being a Protestant to a Catholic-majority country, and the overwhelming popularity of Magsaysay. Feeling disrespected and defeated, Osias eventually switched to the Liberal Party.

== Personal life and legacy ==
Osías was married to Ildefonsa Cuaresma, a former public school teacher from Bacnotan, near his hometown, from 1914 to their divorce in 1939. The couple raised seven children, Camilo Jr., Salvador, Victor, Apolinario, Rebecca, Benjamin and Rosita. Camilo later married Avelina Lorenzana in Reno, Nevada, but produced no children.

Camilo Osías St. in New Haven Subdivision, Quezon City was named after the senator.

== Gallery ==
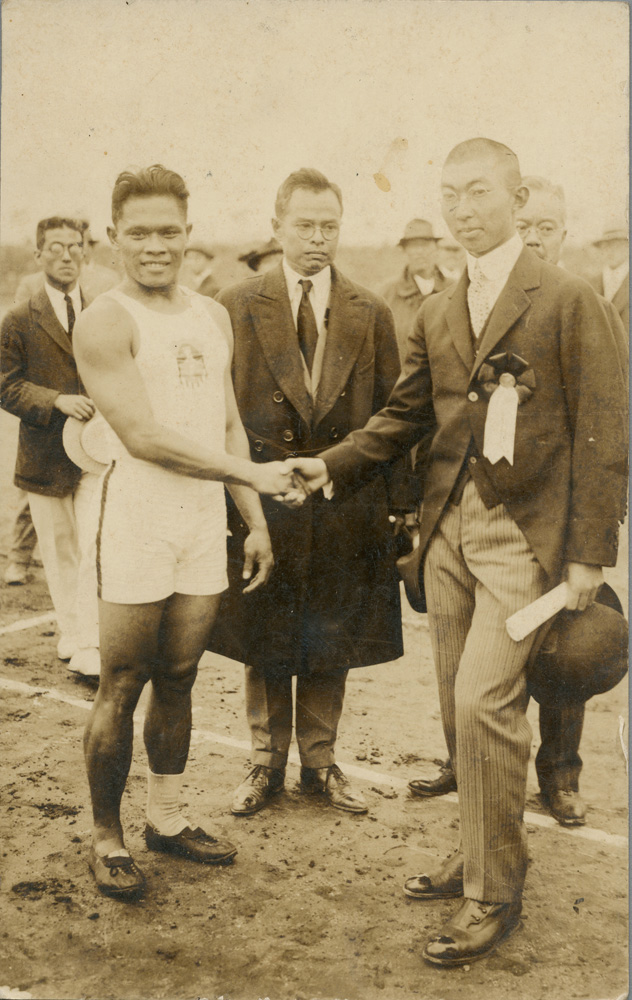
Osías (center) with Fortunato Catalon (left) and Yasuhito (right)

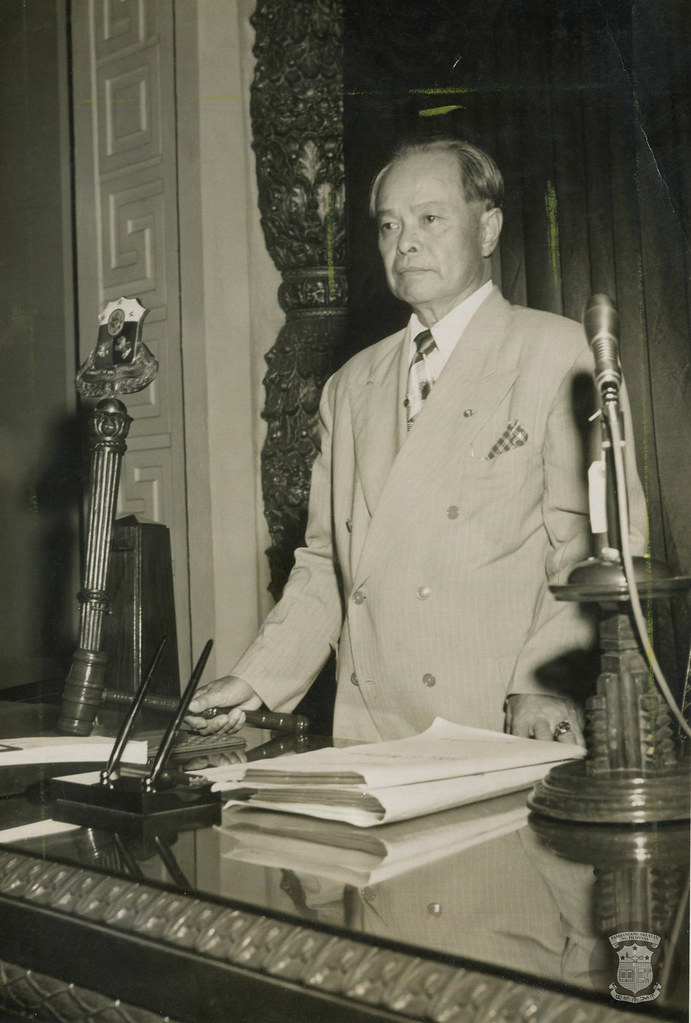
Osías during the senate session

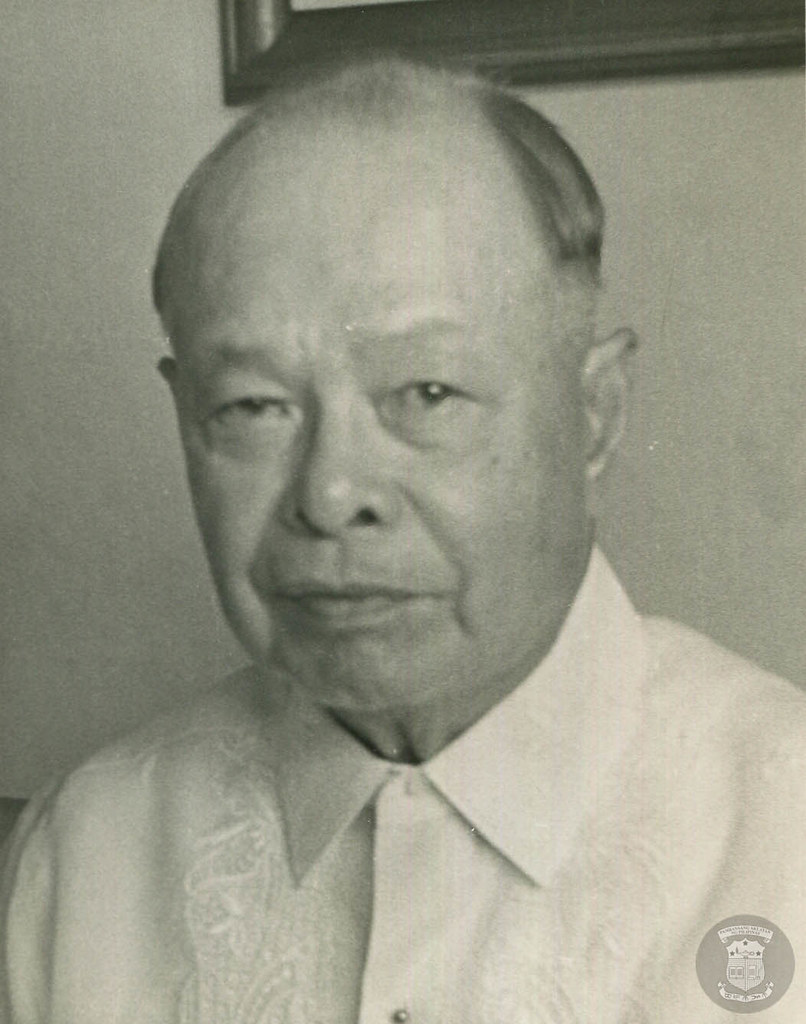
Osías in his later years

== Bibliography ==
- Camilo Osías: The Story of a Long Career of Varied Tasks (Manlapaz Publishing Co., Quezon City, 1971)
- Eduardo Bananal: Camilo Osías: Educator and Statesman (Manlapaz Publishing Co., Quezon City, 1974)
- Camilo Osias (sic) in Hispanic Americans in Congress, 1822-1995, prepared under the direction of the Joint Committee on Printing by Carmen E. Enciso and Tracy North, Hispanic Division, Library of Congress (Government Printing Office, Washington, 1995)

== See also ==
- List of Asian Americans and Pacific Islands Americans in the United States Congress
- Resident Commissioner of the Philippines

Senate of the Philippines
Preceded by Bernabé de Guzmán	Senator of the Philippines from the 2nd district 1925–1929	Succeeded by Alejandro de Guzmán
Preceded by Quintin Paredes	President of the Senate of the Philippines; 1952	Succeeded by Eulogio A. Rodriguez, Sr.
Preceded by Eulogio A. Rodriguez, Sr.	President of the Senate of the Philippines; 1952	Succeeded by Jose Zulueta
Preceded by Lorenzo Sumulong	President pro tempore of the Senate of the Philippines; 1967	Succeeded by Jose Roy
U.S. House of Representatives
Preceded by Isauro Gabaldon	Resident Commissioner from the Philippines to the United States Congress; 1929–1935; Served alongside: Pedro Guevara	Succeeded by Francisco A. Delgado
Government offices
Preceded by Gabriel Mañalac as Minister of Education, Health and Public Welfare	Minister of Education; 1944–1945	Succeeded by Carlos P. Romulo as Secretary of Information and Public Relations
