= Philippines's 2nd senatorial district =

- Former constituency for the Senate of the Philippines
- Provinces / Cities: La Union, Pangasinan, Zambales
- Population: 997,314 (1935)
- Electorate: 176,535 (1935)

Former constituency
- Created: 1916
- Abolished: 1934

Philippines's 2nd senatorial district, officially the Second Senatorial District of the Philippine Islands (Spanish: Segundo Distrito Senatorial de las Islas Filipinas), was one of the twelve senatorial districts of the Philippines in existence between 1916 and 1935. It elected two members to the Senate of the Philippines, the upper chamber of the bicameral Philippine Legislature under the Insular Government of the Philippine Islands for each of the 4th to 10th legislatures. The district was created under the 1916 Jones Law from the west-central Luzon provinces of La Union, Pangasinan and Zambales.

The district was represented by a total of eight senators throughout its existence. It was abolished in 1935 when a unicameral National Assembly was installed under a new constitution following the passage of the Tydings–McDuffie Act which established the Commonwealth of the Philippines. Since the 1941 elections when the Senate was restored after a constitutional plebiscite, all twenty-four members of the upper house have been elected countrywide at-large. It was last represented by Teófilo Sison of the Nacionalista Democrático and Alejo Mabanag of the Nacionalista Demócrata Pro-Independencia.

== List of senators ==
Seat A							Legislature	Seat B						
#	Image	Senator	Term of office		Party	Electoral history	Legislature	#	Image	Senator	Term of office		Party	Electoral history
#	Image	Senator	Start	End	Party	Electoral history	Legislature	#	Image	Senator	Start	End	Party	Electoral history
1		Pedro María Sison	October 16, 1916	June 6, 1922	Nacionalista	Elected in 1916.	4th	1		Aquilino Calvo	October 16, 1916	February 20, 1917	Nacionalista	Elected in 1916. Resigned on appointment as Mountain Province governor.
1		Pedro María Sison	October 16, 1916	June 6, 1922	Nacionalista	Elected in 1916.	4th	2		Matías González	May 5, 1917	June 3, 1919	Nacionalista	Elected in 1917 to finish Calvo's term.
1		Pedro María Sison	October 16, 1916	June 6, 1922	Nacionalista	Elected in 1916.	5th	3		Bernabé de Guzmán	June 3, 1919	June 2, 1925	Nacionalista	Elected in 1919.
2		Alejo Mabanag	June 6, 1922	June 5, 1928	Nacionalista; Unipersonalista	Elected in 1922.	6th	3		Bernabé de Guzmán	June 3, 1919	June 2, 1925	Nacionalista; Unipersonalista	Elected in 1919.
2		Alejo Mabanag	June 6, 1922	June 5, 1928	Demócrata	Elected in 1922.	7th	4		Camilo Osías	June 2, 1925	February 7, 1929	Nacionalista; Consolidado	Elected in 1925. Resigned on appointment as Resident Commissioner.
3		Teófilo Sison	June 5, 1928	September 16, 1935	Nacionalista; Consolidado	Elected in 1928.	8th	4		Camilo Osías	June 2, 1925	February 7, 1929	Nacionalista; Consolidado	Elected in 1925. Resigned on appointment as Resident Commissioner.
3		Teófilo Sison	June 5, 1928	September 16, 1935	Nacionalista; Consolidado	Elected in 1928.	8th	5		Alejandro de Guzmán	April 4, 1929	June 2, 1931	Nacionalista; Consolidado	Elected in 1929 to finish Osías's term.
3		Teófilo Sison	June 5, 1928	September 16, 1935	Nacionalista; Consolidado	Elected in 1928.	9th	6		Alejo Mabanag	June 2, 1931	September 16, 1935	Demócrata	Elected in 1931.
3		Teófilo Sison	June 5, 1928	September 16, 1935	Nacionalista; Democrático	Re-elected in 1934.	10th	6		Alejo Mabanag	June 2, 1931	September 16, 1935	Nacionalista; Demócrata Pro-Independencia	Elected in 1931.

== See also ==
- Senatorial districts of the Philippines
