= Matías González (politician) =

Filipino politician

The Honorable Matías González
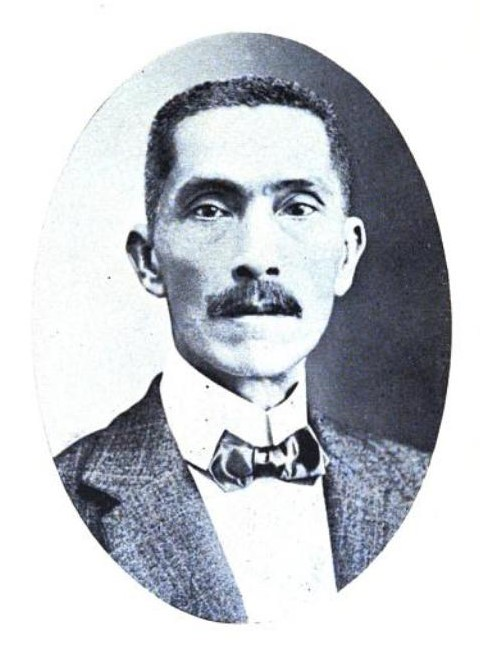
- Gonzalez in 1908

Senator of the Philippines from the 2nd district
- In office 5 May 1917 – 3 June 1919 Serving with Pedro Maria Sison
- Preceded by: Aquilino Calvo
- Succeeded by: Bernabé de Guzmán

Member of the Philippine House of Representatives from Pangasinan's 5th district
- In office 16 October 1907 – 16 October 1909
- Preceded by: position established
- Succeeded by: Domingo Patajo

Personal details
- Born: February 24, 1857 Rosales, Pangasinan, Captaincy General of the Philippines
- Died: April 23, 1927 (aged 70) Manila, Philippine Islands

Matías González y Mondragón (February 24, 1857 – April 23, 1927) was a Filipino politician.

== Biography ==
Matías González y Mondragón was born on February 24, 1857, in Rosales, Pangasinan, to Don Francisco González y Reinado and Esperanza Mondragon. He studied at the Ateneo Municipal de Manila and obtained his Bachelor of Arts degree there and completed bachelor's degrees in agriculture and accountancy. After his studies he lived and worked on his hacienda in Nueva Ecija.

During the Philippine Revolution, Gonzales served as treasurer of the revolutionary government in Malolos and later, as mayor of Bautista, Pangasinan. In 1907, Gonzales was elected to the Philippine House of Representatives to represent Pangasinan's 5th district. On May 5, 1917, Gonzales won the special election for the remainder of Aquilino Calvo's term in the Senate of the Philippines that lasted until 1919, following Calvo's appointment as governor of Mountain Province.
