= Aquilino Calvo =

Filipino politician (1871–1932)

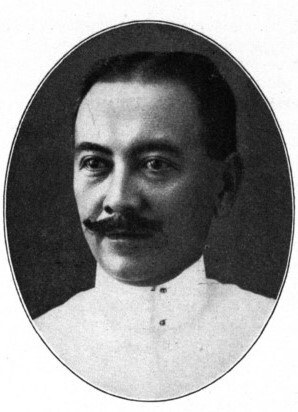
- Official portrait, c. 1917

Senator of the Philippines from the 2nd district
- In office October 16, 1916 – February 20, 1917 Serving with Pedro Maria Sison
- Preceded by: position established
- Succeeded by: Matias Gonzales

Governor of Mountain Province
- In office 1917–1920
- Preceded by: Joaquin Luna
- Succeeded by: Joaquin Luna

6th Governor of Pangasinan
- In office November 27, 1912 – October 15, 1916
- Preceded by: Juan Alvear
- Succeeded by: Daniel Maramba

Personal details
- Born: January 4, 1871 Vigan, Ilocos Sur, Captaincy General of the Philippines
- Died: July 15, 1932 (aged 61) Vigan, Philippine Islands

Aquilino Calvo y del Rosario (January 4, 1871 – July 15, 1932) was a Filipino politician.

== Early life and education ==
Aquilino Calvo was born on January 4, 1871, in Vigan, Ilocos Sur, to Juan Calvo and Lucina del Rosario. Calvo attended Vigan Seminary and completed a Bachelor of Arts degree and a Bachelor of Medicine and Surgery degree from the University of Santo Tomas.

== Political career ==
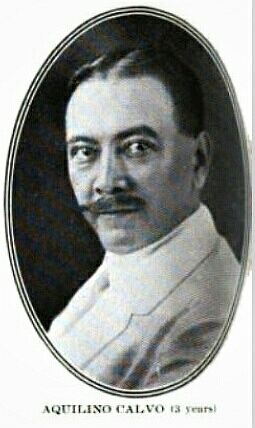
Calvo depicted in a publication of Philippine Education, published April 1917

Calvo served as governor of Pangasinan from 1912 to 1916. In 1916, he was elected to the newly established Senate of the Philippines representing the 2nd district. On February 1, 1917, he resigned after being appointed governor of Mountain Province, a position he held until 1920. He was replaced by Matias Gonzales in a special election on May 5, 1917, for the remainder of his term through 1919.

Calvo's tenure as a senator was marred by his disagreements with his colleagues. He was also described as having "irrational behavior punctuated by an uncontrolled temper", which led some journalists at the time to speculate that his appointment as governor of Mountain Province was meant to remove him from the Senate. Likewise, his term as governor of Mountain Province also saw conflict with his lieutenant governors, particularly Joaquin Ortega of Bontoc, whom Calvo accused of wanting to replace him. Some of the lieutenant-governors later expressed their belief that Calvo was mentally unsound and "a bit crazy".

== Death ==
He died in 1932 at the age of 61.
