= Alejandro de Guzmán =

Filipino lawyer and politician (1889-1941)

The Honorable Alejandro de Guzmán
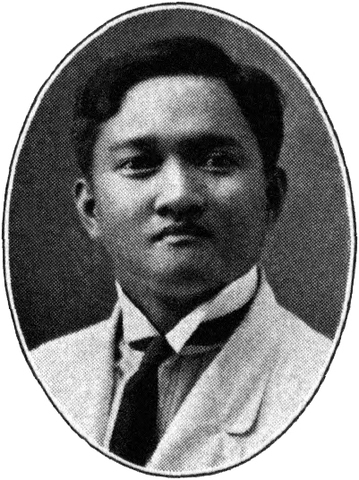
- de Guzmán as member of the Philippine House of Representatives, c. 1917

Senator of the Philippines from the 2nd district
- In office 4 April 1929 – 2 April 1931 Serving with Teofilo Sison
- Preceded by: Camilo Osias
- Succeeded by: Alejo Mabanag

Member of the Philippine House of Representatives from Pangasinan
- In office June 3, 1919 – June 6, 1922
- Preceded by: Aquilino Banaag
- Succeeded by: Lamberto Siguión Reyna
- Constituency: 2nd district
- In office 16 October 1916 – 3 June 1919
- Preceded by: Pedro Maria Sison
- Succeeded by: Alejandro Mendoza
- Constituency: 4th district

Personal details
- Born: February 24, 1889 Bauang, La Union, Captaincy General of the Philippines
- Died: October 24, 1941 (aged 52) Dagupan, Pangasinan, Commonwealth of the Philippines

Alejandro de Guzmán y Floirendo (February 24, 1889 – October 24, 1941) was a Filipino lawyer and politician. He was also a senator from the Second Senatorial District of the Philippines from 1929 to 1931. He represented the fourth district of Pangasinan at the House of Representatives of the Philippines from 1916 to 1919. He later represented the second district of the same province at the same house from 1919 to 1922.

== Early life and education ==
Alejandro de Guzman was born on February 24, 1889, in Bauang, La Union to Pelayo de Guzman and Graciana Floirendo. He completed a bachelor's degree in law from the University of the Philippines in 1913. On October 17 of the same year, he passed the entrance exam of the Philippine Bar.

== Political career ==
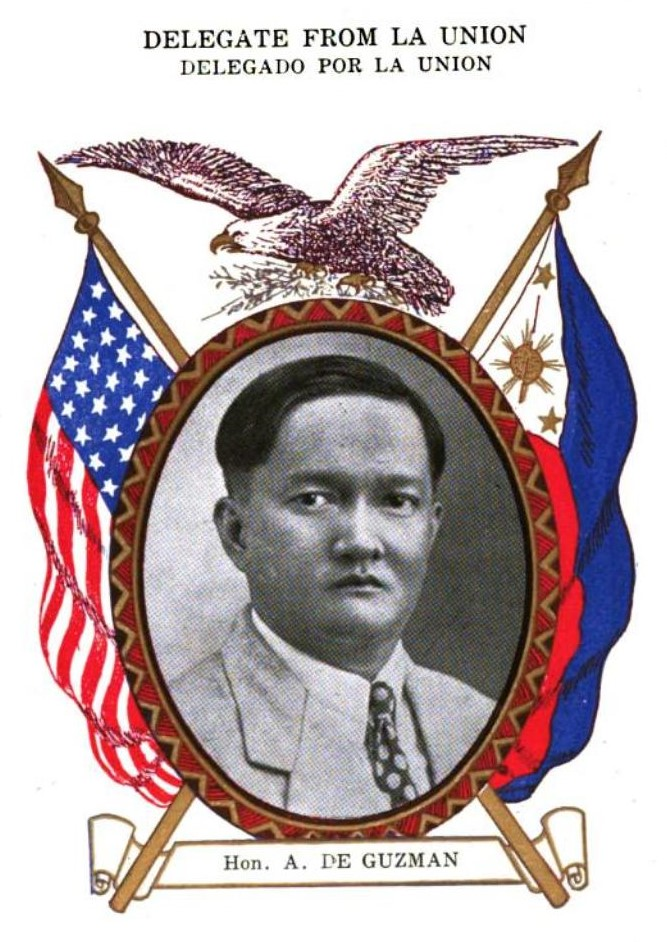
A. de Guzmán as a delegate to the Philippine Constitutional Convention, published by Benipayo Press (c. 1935)

In 1916, De Guzman was elected to the Philippine House of Representatives on behalf of Pangasinan's 4th district, serving until 1919. After Camilo Osias was elected Resident Commissioner to the United States in 1929, De Guzman was elected to the Senate of the Philippines in special elections representing the 2nd district for the remainder of his term until 1931. In 1934, De Guzman was elected as a delegate from La Union's 2nd District to the Constitutional Convention which drafted the 1935 Philippine Constitution.

In addition to his political career, de Guzman served on the board of trustees of the University of the Philippines from 1915 to 1917 and from 1929 to 1931. He was also active as a businessman and worked as a lawyer.

== Personal life ==
De Guzman was married to Rosario Flor and had six children. His brother, Bernabé de Guzmán, was also a senator from 1919 to 1925.
