= Pedro María Sison =

Filipino politician

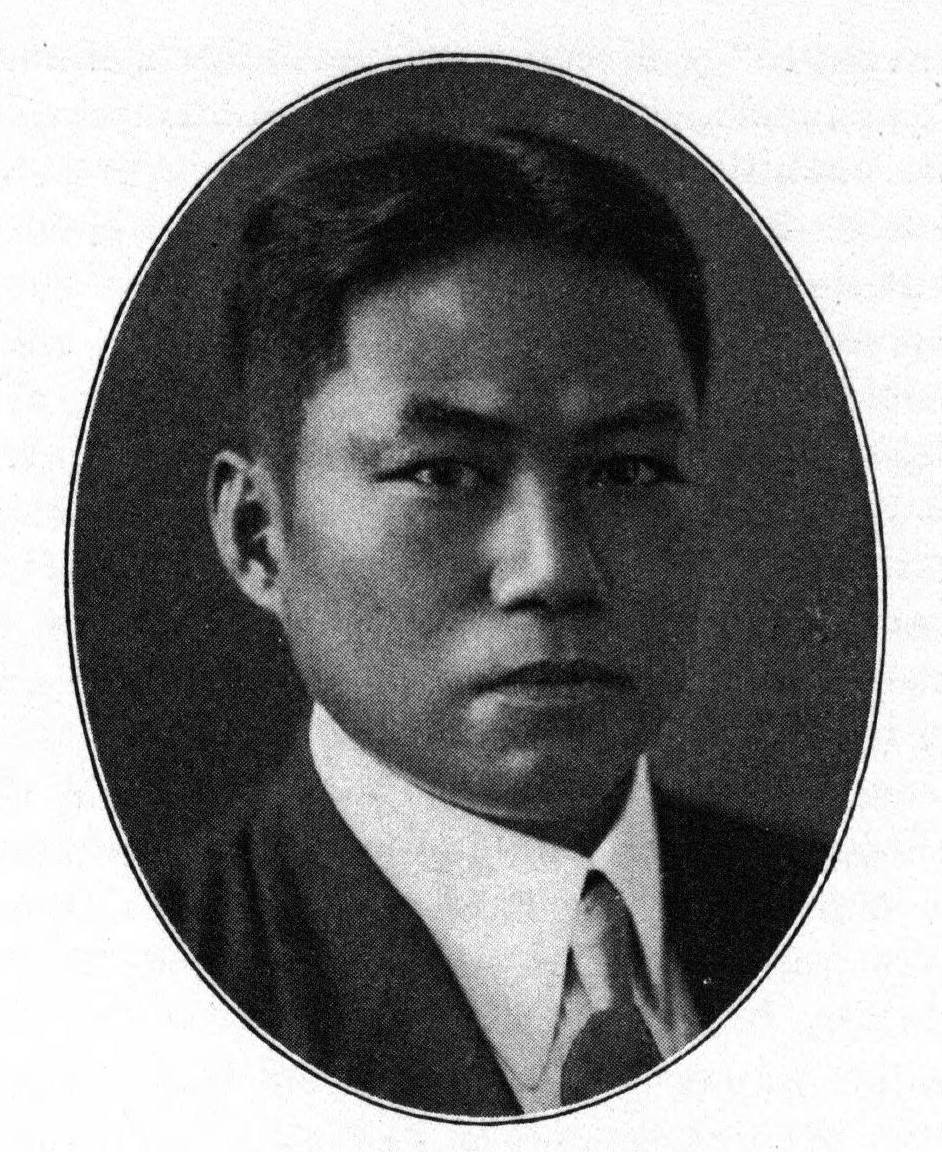
- Official portrait, c. 1917

Senator of the Philippines from the 2nd district
- In office October 16, 1916 – June 6, 1922
- Preceded by: Position established
- Succeeded by: Alejo R. Mabanag

Member of the Philippine Assembly from Pangasinan's 4th district
- In office 1912–1916
- Preceded by: Joaquín Balmori
- Succeeded by: Alejandro de Guzmán (as Representative)

Personal details
- Born: January 18, 1885 Urdaneta, Pangasinan, Captaincy General of the Philippines
- Died: June 12, 1938 (aged 53) Manila, Commonwealth of the Philippines
- Party: Nacionalista
- Spouse: Gracia Palisoc Moran
- Children: 9

Pedro María Sison y Macasieb (January 18, 1885–June 12, 1938) was a senator of the Philippines, judge of the Court of First Instance, a statesman and philanthropist. He was a delegate to the Philippine Constitutional Convention of 1935.

== Biography ==
Sison was born in Urdaneta, Pangasinan, on January 18, 1885. His father was Pedro Sison Jr., and his mother was Eusebia Macasieb.

In 1896, at the age of 11, Sison joined his father in fighting the Spaniards during the Philippine Revolution. During the American colonial period, he helped his father restore peace and order in Binalonan and Urdaneta towns.

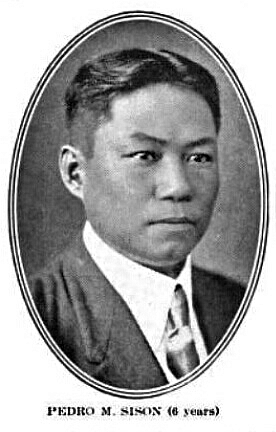
Sison depicted in a publication of Philippine Education, published April 1917

In 1912, at the age of 27, Sison was elected to the Philippine Assembly, representing Pangasinan's 4th district. Four years later, he was elected to the Philippine Senate. Representing the Second Senatorial District of La Union, Pangasinan, and Zambales, Sison served as a senator during the Fourth and Fifth Legislature from 1916 to 1922.

Together with Rafael Palma, Sison sponsored in 1916 a bill on women's suffrage that was approved by the Senate. It was the first time that such bill was sponsored. In 1917, he became the chairperson of the Senate Committee on Judiciary.

On February 28, 1929, he was appointed as an auxiliary judge. The following year, he was promoted as judge of Court of First Instance.

In 1934, he was elected as a delegate to the 1935 Philippine Constitutional Convention.

== Personal life and death ==
He married Gracia Palisoc Moran, and had nine children.

Sison died on June 12, 1938.
