= Manuel Camus =

Filipino senator and scoutleader (1875–1949)

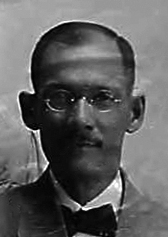
- Camus in 1916

Senator of the Philippines from the 12th district
- In office July 14, 1928 – June 2, 1931
- Appointed by: Henry L. Stimson
- Preceded by: José Alejandrino
- Succeeded by: Jamalul Kiram II

Personal details
- Born: October 16, 1875 Quiapo, Manila, Captaincy General of the Philippines
- Died: December 22, 1949 (aged 74) Santa Mesa, Manila, Philippines
- Resting place: Basilica of the National Shrine of Our Lady of Mount Carmel Crypt, Quezon City
- Party: Nacionalista

Manuel Roxas Camus (October 16, 1875 – December 22, 1949) was a lawyer and a Philippine senator.

== Education ==
Camus completed his education in Singapore and returned to the Philippines in 1899 to serve as an interpreter and translator for the Provost Marshal General of the United States Army.

== Career ==
From 1928 to 1931, Camus served as a senator in the Philippine Senate.

A lawyer by profession, he held position in numerous private and public offices : Partner, Dizon and Zavalla; acting honorary consul for Peru; Vice-president, Gold Rock Mining Co.; member, board of directors, Federated Management and Investment Syndicate; member, Anti-Usury Board; president, El Hogar Filipino; scout commissioner, Philippine Council, Boy Scouts of America; director, Metropolitan Theater Co.; president, national committee, Y.M.C.A. of the Philippine Islands; chairman, disaster relief committee, Philippine Red Cross (American National Red Cross); member, American Bar Association; president, Community Publishers, Inc.; and president, executive committee, Greater Manila Civic League.

He was a charter member (1936) and the president and chief scout of the Boy Scouts of the Philippines in 1945 to 1949.

== The seven charter members and founding ==
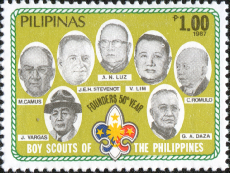
Camus (far left) on a stamp featuring the "Founders of the Boy Scouts of the Philippines". Stamp for the National Boy Scout Movement's 50th Anniversary, October 28, 1987

Fathers of the Boy Scouts of the Philippines are Camus, Joseph Emile H. Stevenot, Arsenio N. Luz, Carlos P. Romulo, General Vicente Lim, Jorge B. Vargas and Gabriel A. Daza.

On January 1, 1938, the inauguration of the Boy Scouts of the Philippines was held in front of the Legislative Building in Manila, with Exequiel Villacorta taking over as chief scout executive, equivalent to the position of today's secretary general.

J.E.H. Stevenot served as the first president of the BSP, with Vargas as first vice president, Romulo as second vice president, Lim as treasurer, Camus as national scout commissioner, Exequiel Villacorta as chief scout executive, and Severino V. Araos as deputy chief scout executive.
