= Alejo Mabanag =

Filipino lawyer and politician

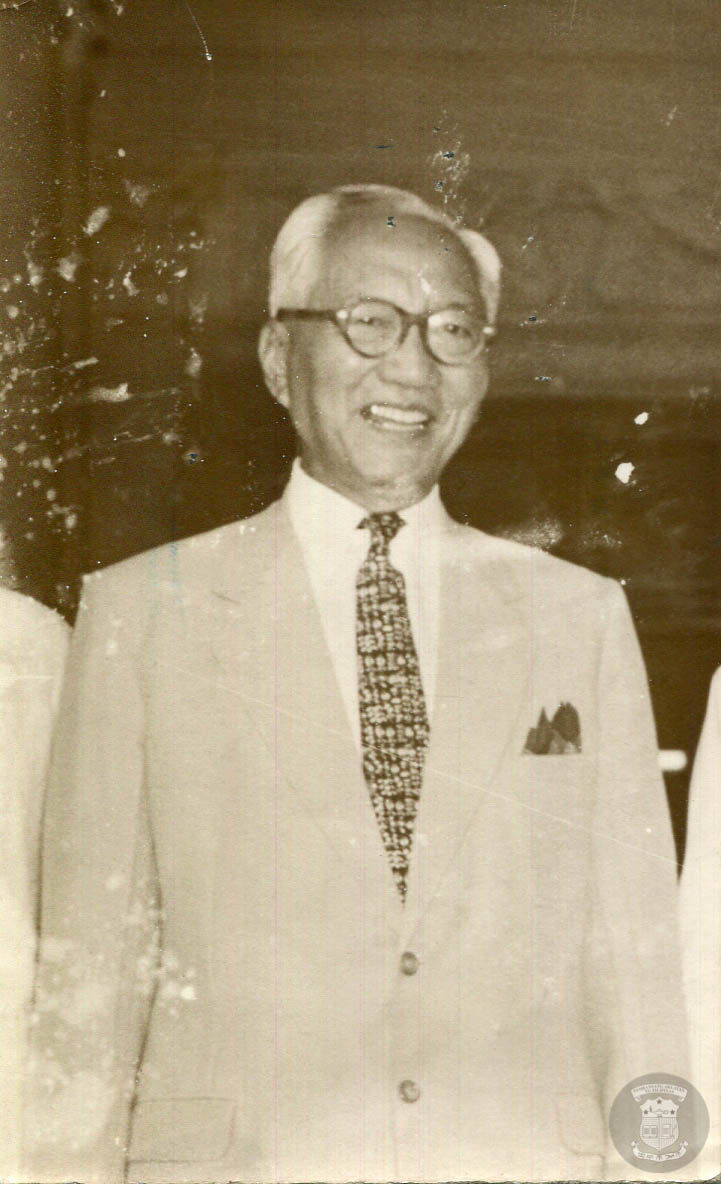

30th Secretary of Justice
- In office July 14, 1959 – December 30, 1961
- Appointed by: Carlos P. Garcia
- Preceded by: Enrique Fernandez
- Succeeded by: José W. Diokno

Senator of the Philippines
- In office December 30, 1953 – July 14, 1959
- Constituency: At-large
- In office May 25, 1946 – December 30, 1949
- Constituency: At-large
- In office 1931–1935
- Preceded by: Alejandro de Guzmán
- Succeeded by: Post abolished
- Constituency: 2nd district
- In office 1922–1928
- Preceded by: Pedro María Sison
- Succeeded by: Teofilo Sison
- Constituency: 2nd district

Member of the Lingayen Municipal Council
- In office 1916–1919

Personal details
- Born: July 14, 1886 San Fernando, La Union, Captaincy General of the Philippines
- Died: February 7, 1979 (aged 92)
- Party: Nacionalista (1922–1925; 1934–1979)
- Other political affiliations: Democrata (1925–1934)
- Education: University of Santo Tomas (BA); La Jurisprudencia (LLB)

Alejo Ragojo Mabanag (July 14, 1886 – February 7, 1979) was a Filipino lawyer and politician.

== Early years ==
Mabanag was born on San Fernando, La Union, to Liberato Mabanag of Camalaniugan, Cagayan and Manuela Ragojo of Bangar, La Union.

== Education ==
Mabanag worked as a clerk in the Executive Bureau from 1903 to 1912. During that time, he finished his Bachelor of Arts degree at the University of Santo Tomas in 1908 and his Bachelor of Laws degree from La Jurisprudencia in 1912. He then placed second in the bar examinations the same year and opened a law firm in Lingayen, Pangasinan.

== Political career ==
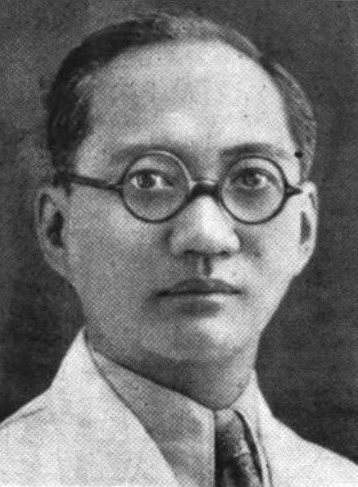
Senatorial portrait of Mabanag, published by Benipayo Press, c. 1935

Mabanag was elected to the Lingayen municipal council from 1916 to 1919. He successfully ran for Senator to represent the Second Senatorial District from 1922 to 1928 and from 1931 to the abolition of the Senate in 1935.

Upon the establishment of the Commonwealth government in 1935, President Manuel L. Quezon appointed him Judge of the Court of First Instance of Iloilo up to 1938 and later named as city fiscal of Manila until 1945.

He successfully ran for an at-large seat in the Senate in 1946 but lost reelection in 1949. Nevertheless, he stayed in the chamber as chief counsel of the Senate Blue Ribbon Committee and in the 1953 elections was elected again as a Senator under the Nacionalista Party ticket.

In 1959, he was appointed by President Carlos P. Garcia to become his Secretary of Justice before his term in the Senate ended. He served until 1961.

== Family ==
He was married to Jacoba Ramirez and had 13 children.
