= Teófilo Sison =

Filipino politician (1880-1975)

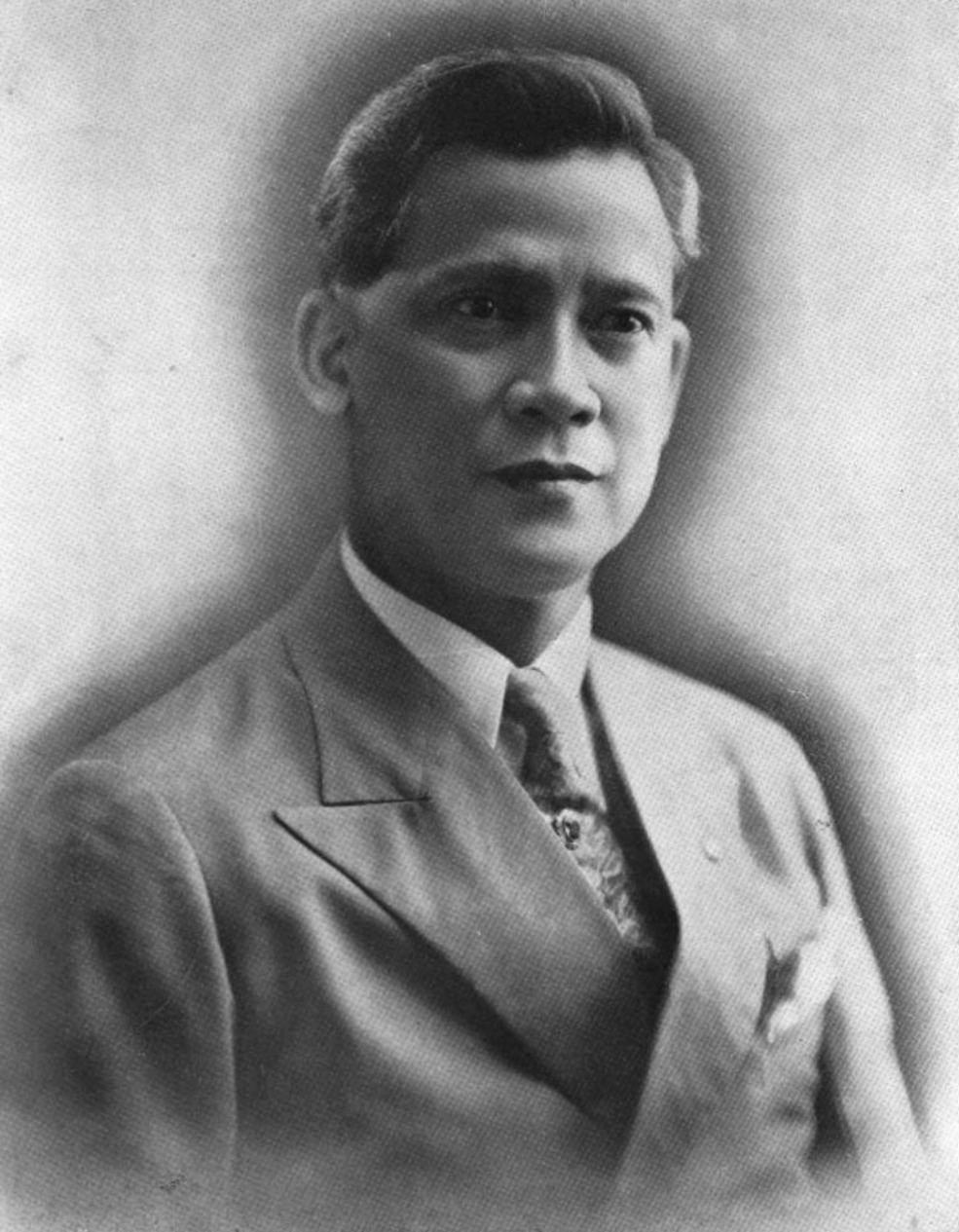
- Photograph from The Commercial & Industrial Manual of the Philippines, 1941

Commissioner of Justice
- In office December 4, 1942 – October 14, 1943
- Appointed by: Manuel Quezon
- Preceded by: Jose P. Laurel
- Succeeded by: Quintin Paredes

Secretary of Justice
- In office July 18, 1941 – November 27, 1941
- Appointed by: Manuel Quezon
- Preceded by: Jose Abad Santos
- Succeeded by: Jose P. Laurel

1st Secretary of National Defense
- In office November 1, 1939 – July 15, 1941
- Appointed by: Manuel Quezon
- Preceded by: Post established
- Succeeded by: Manuel Quezon in concurrent capacity as President

Secretary of the Interior
- In office 1933–1935
- Preceded by: Honorio Ventura
- Succeeded by: Elpidio Quirino

Senator of the Philippines from the 2nd district
- In office June 5, 1928 – November 15, 1935 Serving with Camilo Osías (1928–1929); Alejandro de Guzman (1929-1931); Alejo Mabanag (1931–1935)
- Preceded by: Alejo Mabanag
- Succeeded by: Post abolished

8th Governor of Pangasinan
- In office October 16, 1922 – June 25, 1928
- Preceded by: Daniel Maramba
- Succeeded by: Pedro Quintans

Member of the Lingayen Municipal Council
- In office June 1916 – October 1919

Personal details
- Born: February 29, 1880 Dagupan, Pangasinan, Captaincy General of the Philippines
- Died: April 13, 1975 (aged 95) Marikina, Rizal, Philippines
- Party: Nacionalista
- Children: 2
- Education: University of Santo Tomas
- Occupation: Politician

Teófilo Leuterio Sison (February 29, 1880 – April 13, 1975) was a Philippine legislator and the first Secretary of National Defense of the Philippine Commonwealth.

== Early life ==
Sison was born on February 29, 1880, in Dagupan, Pangasinan, to Benito Sison and Escolastica Leuterio.

He studied at the College of San Alberto Magno, obtaining a Bachelor of Arts degree in 1896 and the University of Santo Tomas, B.A., in the same year. He taught in the public schools of Binmaley, Pangasinan from October 1900 until June 1901.

== Career ==
=== Legal career ===
On July 1, 1901, he was appointed interpreter for the Court of First Instance Third Judicial District. It was during his term as court interpreter that he married Filomena Solis in Lingayen, Pangasinan on November 19, 1910. He served in such capacity until July 1, 1914, when he was reappointed to a similar position in the 5th District where he remained until September 30, 1914.

After he passed the Philippine Bar examination on September 7, 1914, he established his own law office and engaged in the active practice of his profession.

=== Political career ===
In June 1916, he was elected Municipal Councilor of Lingayen, a position he held until October 1919. He went on to become Provincial Governor of Pangasinan during the June 1922 election and was re-elected in the general elections of 1925.

Then in June 1928, he was elected for the Second Senatorial District, comprising the provinces of Pangasinan, La Union and Zambales. As Senator during the period 1928–1931, he was Chairman of the Committees on Civil Service and National Enterprise, and member of the following committees: Finance, Public Works and Communication, Appointments, Justice, Municipal and Provincial Governments, Election and Privileges, City of Manila, Commerce and Industry, Labor and Immigration.

During the 9th Legislative Assembly, he was chairman of the Committee of Justice and member of the following committees: Finance, Public Works and Communication, Appointments, Public Instruction, External Relations, Banks Corporations and Franchise, Commerce and Industry, City of Manila, Municipal and Provincial Governments, Labor and Immigration, Civil Service and Library.

=== Secretary of National Defense ===
He was appointed Secretary of National Defense on November 1, 1939, during the presidency of Manuel Quezon pursuant to the enactment of Commonwealth Act No. 1 or the National Defense Act.

== Death ==
He died two months after his 95th birthday on April 13, 1975. He was buried at Loyola Memorial Park in Marikina.

== Gallery ==
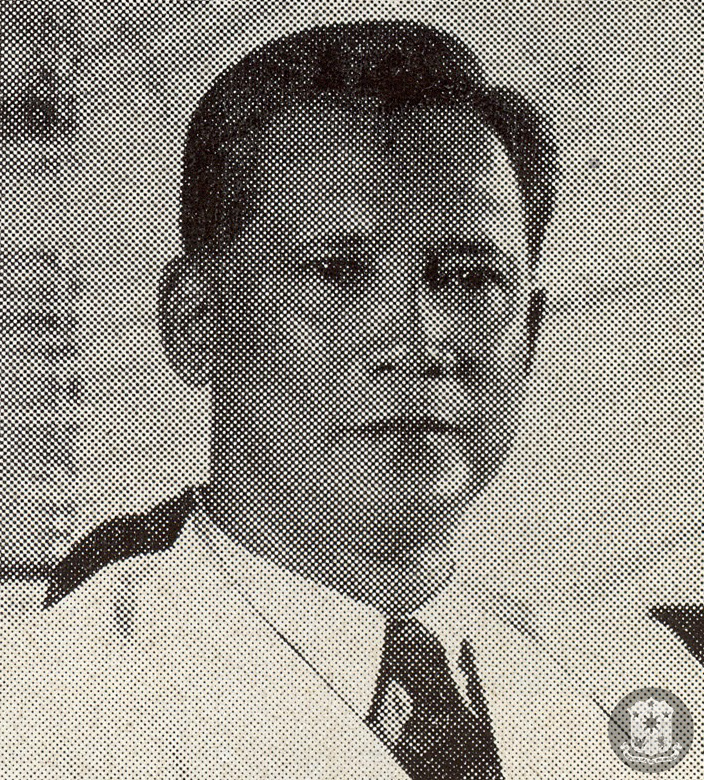
Official portrait as Secretary of National Defense

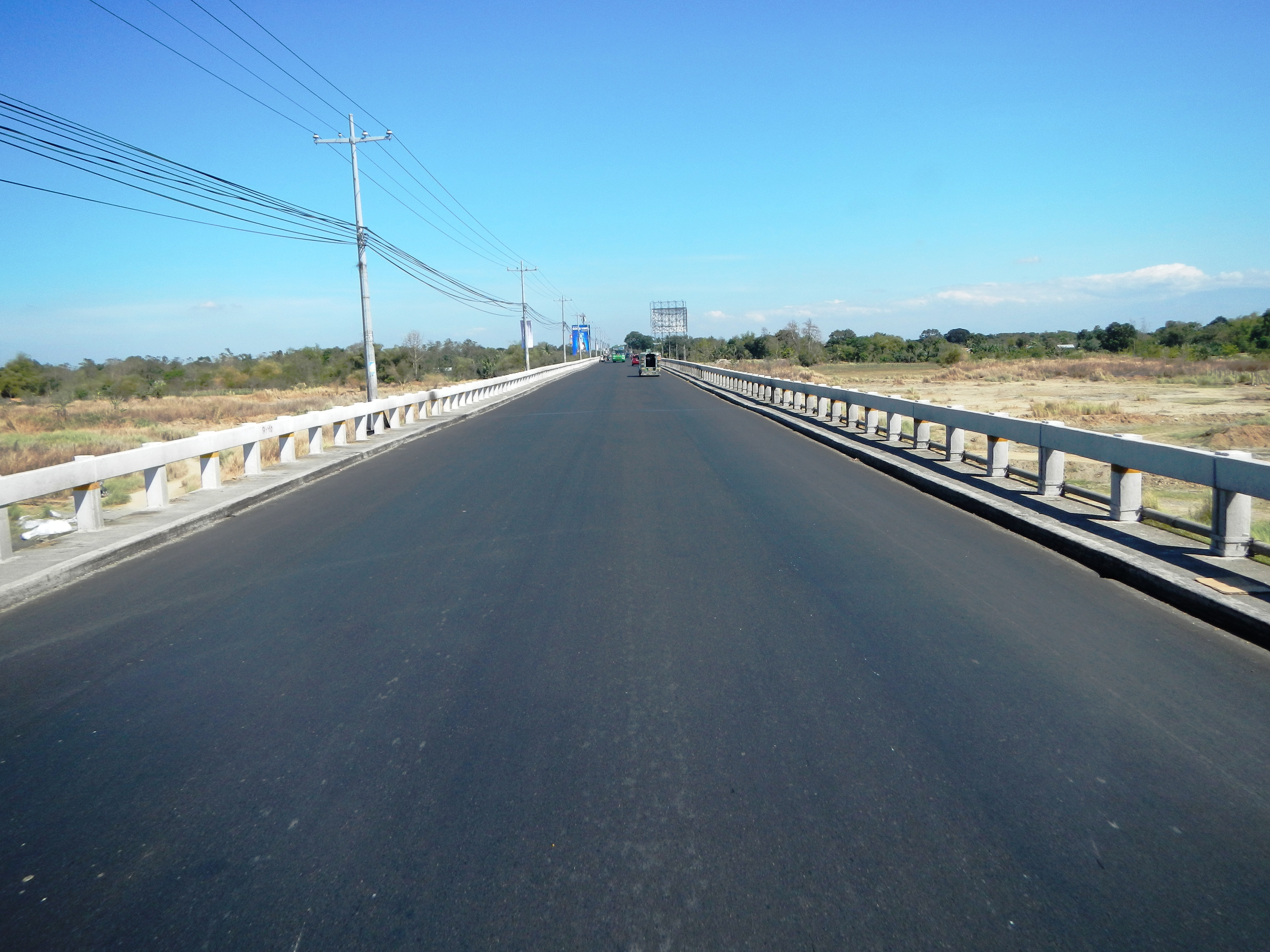
Don Teofilo Sison Bridge, Carmen, Rosales

== See also ==
- List of secretaries of the Department of National Defense of the Philippines
