= Legislative districts of Bohol =

Legislative districts of the Philippines

The legislative districts of Bohol are the representations of the province of Bohol in the various national legislatures of the Philippines. The province is currently represented in the lower house of the Congress of the Philippines through its first, second, and third congressional districts.

== History ==
Bohol had been divided into three congressional districts since 1907, although the district configurations were altered with the restoration of the House of Representatives in 1987. It was part of the representation of Region VII from 1978 to 1984, and from 1984 to 1986 it elected three assemblymen at-large.

== Current districts ==
Bohol's current congressional delegation is composed of three members.

Political parties

NUP (3)

Legislative districts and representatives of Bohol
District	Current Representative		Party	Constituent LGUs	Population (2020)	Area	Map
District	Image	Name	Party	Constituent LGUs	Population (2020)	Area	Map
1st		John Geesnell L. Yap II (since 2025); Tagbilaran	NUP	List: Alburquerque; Antequera; Baclayon; Balilihan; Calape; Catigbian; Corella; Cortes; Dauis; Loon; Maribojoc; Panglao; Sikatuna; Tagbilaran; Tubigon	443,038	1,002.68 km²	
2nd		Maria Vanessa C. Aumentado (since 2022); Ubay	NUP	List: Bien Unido; Buenavista; Clarin; Dagohoy; Danao; Getafe; Inabanga; Pres. Carlos P. Garcia; Sagbayan; San Isidro; San Miguel; Talibon; Trinidad; Ubay	439,771	1640.57 km²	
3rd		Kristine Alexie B. Tutor (since 2019); Candijay	NUP	List: Alicia; Anda; Batuan; Bilar; Candijay; Carmen; Dimiao; Duero; Garcia Hernandez; Guindulman; Jagna; Lila; Loay; Loboc; Mabini; Pilar; Sevilla; Sierra Bullones; Valencia	452,705	2,187.54 km²	

== Historical districts ==
=== First district (1907–1972) ===
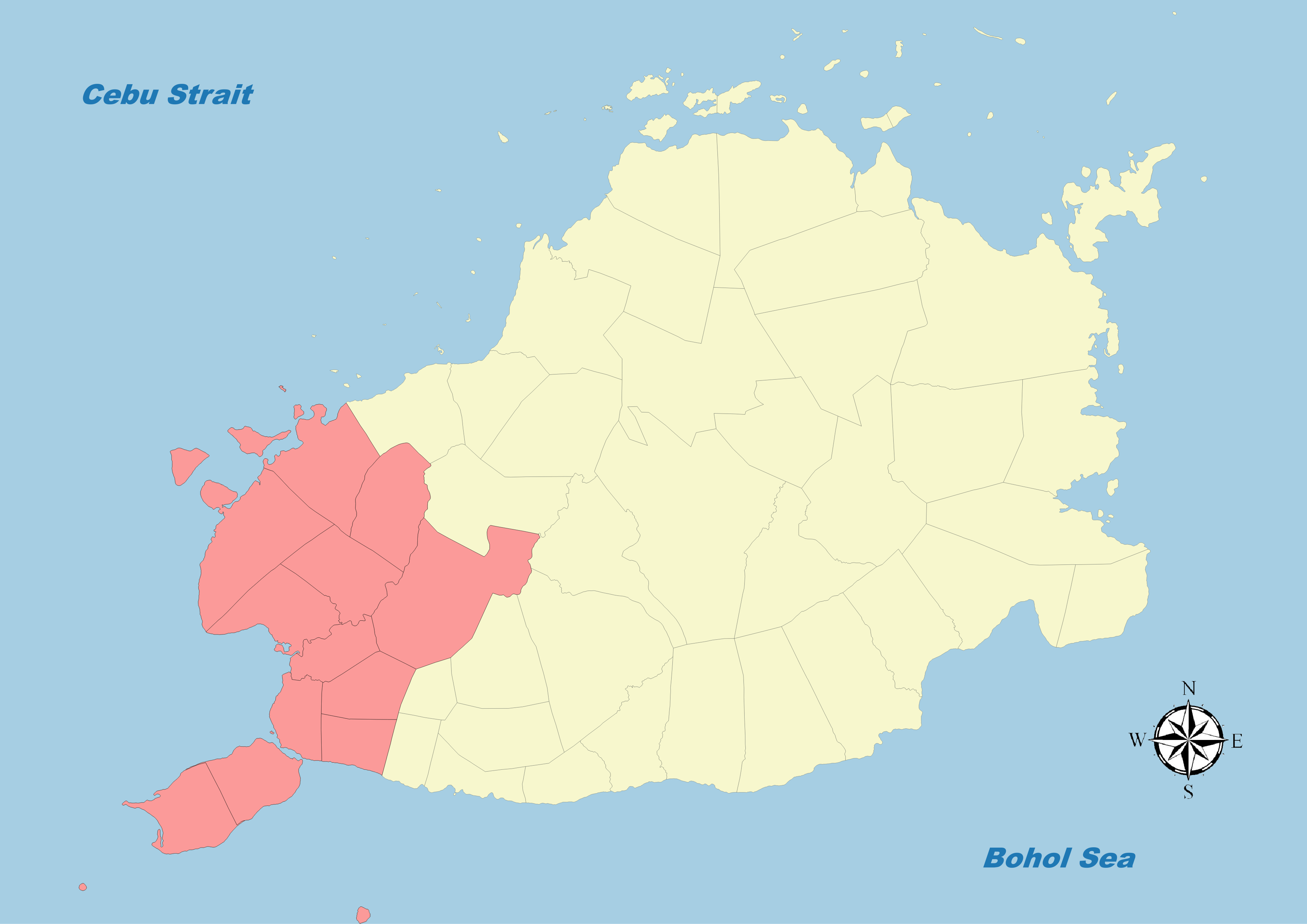
Map of Bohol's First District (1907-1972)

- Municipalities: Antequera, Baclayon, Balilihan, Calape, Corella, Cortes, Dauis, Loon, Maribojoc, Panglao, Tagbilaran (became city 1966), San Isidro (established 1969)

Period	Representative
1st Philippine Legislature; 1907–1909	Candelario Borja
2nd Philippine Legislature; 1909–1912	Candelario Borja
3rd Philippine Legislature; 1912–1916	Candelario Borja
4th Philippine Legislature; 1916–1919	Celestino Gallares
5th Philippine Legislature; 1919–1922	Celestino Gallares
6th Philippine Legislature; 1922–1925	Fermín Torralba
7th Philippine Legislature; 1925–1928	Fermín Torralba
8th Philippine Legislature; 1928–1931	Jose Concon
9th Philippine Legislature; 1931–1934	Jose Concon
10th Philippine Legislature; 1934–1935	Bernardo Josol
1st National Assembly; 1935–1938	Juan Torralba
2nd National Assembly; 1938–1941	Genaro Visarra
1st Commonwealth Congress; 1945	Genaro Visarra
1st Congress; 1946–1949	Genaro Visarra
2nd Congress; 1949–1953	Luis T. Clarin
3rd Congress; 1953–1957	Natalio P. Castillo
4th Congress; 1957–1961	Natalio P. Castillo
5th Congress; 1961–1965	Natalio P. Castillo
6th Congress; 1965–1969	Natalio P. Castillo
7th Congress; 1969–1972	Natalio P. Castillo

=== Second district (1907–1972) ===
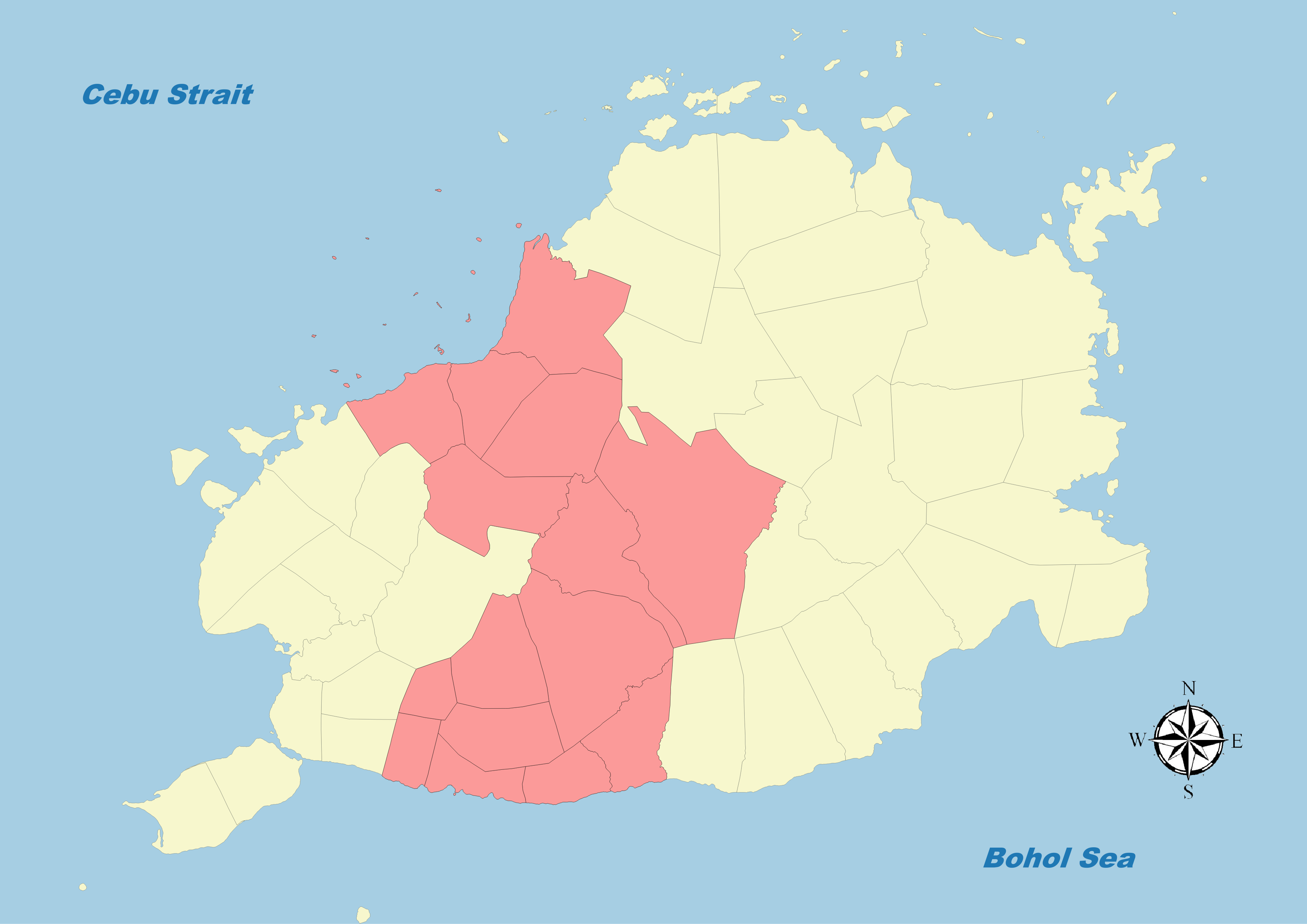
Map of Bohol's Second District (1907-1972)

- Municipalities: Alburquerque, Batuan, Bilar, Carmen, Dimiao, Inabanga, Loay, Loboc, Sevilla, Tubigon, Lila (re-established 1915), Sikatuna (re-established 1917), Clarin (established 1919), Sagbayan (Borja) (established 1949), Catigbian (San Jacinto) (re-established 1949)

Period	Representative
1st Philippine Legislature; 1907–1909	Jose Aniceto B. Clarin
2nd Philippine Legislature; 1909–1912	Jose Aniceto B. Clarin
3rd Philippine Legislature; 1912–1916	Jose Aniceto B. Clarin
4th Philippine Legislature; 1916–1919	Macario Lumain
5th Philippine Legislature; 1919–1922	Macario Lumain
6th Philippine Legislature; 1922–1925	Cornelio G. Sarigumba
7th Philippine Legislature; 1925–1928	Olegario B. Clarin
8th Philippine Legislature; 1928–1931	Marcelo S. Ramirez
9th Philippine Legislature; 1931–1934	Marcelo S. Ramirez
10th Philippine Legislature; 1934–1935	Macario Q. Falcon
1st National Assembly; 1935–1938	Olegario B. Clarin
2nd National Assembly; 1938–1941	Olegario B. Clarin
1st Commonwealth Congress; 1945	Simeon G. Toribio
1st Congress; 1946–1949	Simeon G. Toribio
2nd Congress; 1949–1953	Simeon G. Toribio
3rd Congress; 1953–1957	Bartolome C. Cabangbang
4th Congress; 1957–1961	Bartolome C. Cabangbang
5th Congress; 1961–1965	Bartolome C. Cabangbang
6th Congress; 1965–1969	Jose S. Zafra
7th Congress; 1969–1972	Pablo Malasarte

=== Third district (1907–1972) ===
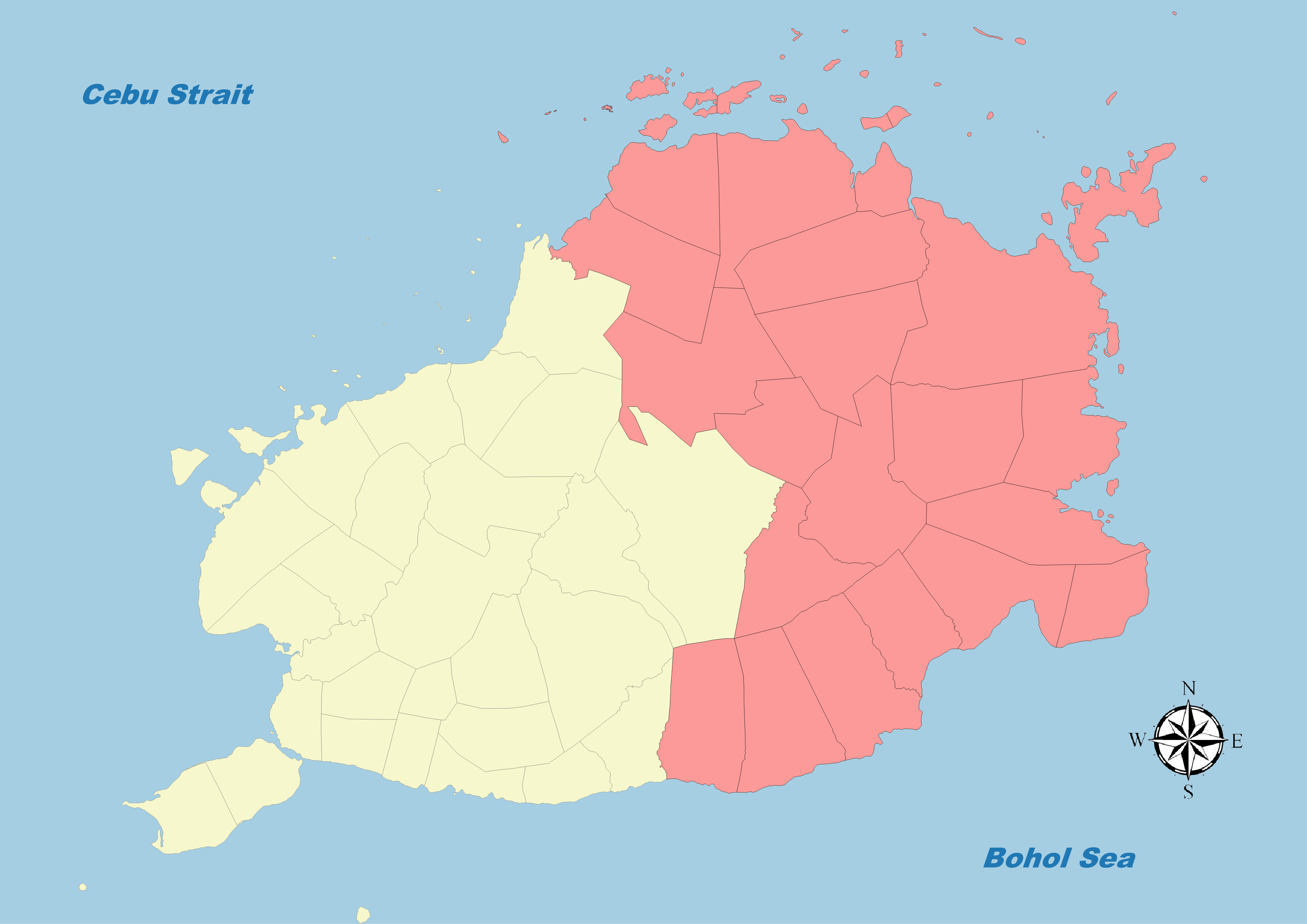
Map of Bohol's Third District (1907-1972)

- Municipalities: Anda, Candijay, Duero, Garcia-Hernandez, Guindulman, Jagna, Jetafe, Mabini, Sierra Bullones, Talibon, Ubay, Valencia, Trinidad (Ipil) (re-established 1947), Alicia (Batuanan) (re-established 1949), Dagohoy (established 1956), Buenavista (established 1959), Pilar (established 1960), San Miguel (established 1961), Danao (established 1961), Pitogo (established 1969)

Period	Representative
1st Philippine Legislature; 1907–1909	Eutiquio Boyles
2nd Philippine Legislature; 1909–1912	Eutiquio Boyles
3rd Philippine Legislature; 1912–1916	Juan Virtudes
4th Philippine Legislature; 1916–1919	Filomeno Orbeta Caseñas
5th Philippine Legislature; 1919–1922	Filomeno Orbeta Caseñas
6th Philippine Legislature; 1922–1925	Teodoro Abueva
7th Philippine Legislature; 1925–1928	Carlos P. Garcia
8th Philippine Legislature; 1928–1931	Carlos P. Garcia
9th Philippine Legislature; 1931–1934	Filomeno Orbeta Caseñas
10th Philippine Legislature; 1934–1935	Margarito E. Revilles
1st National Assembly; 1935–1938	Margarito E. Revilles
2nd National Assembly; 1938–1941	Teofilo B. Buslon
1st Commonwealth Congress; 1945	vacant (Note: Margarito E. Revilles was elected in November 1941 but died before the start of the session on June 9, 1945.)
1st Congress; 1946–1949	Cosme P. Garcia
2nd Congress; 1949–1953	Esteban Bernido
3rd Congress; 1953–1957	Esteban Bernido
4th Congress; 1957–1961	Maximino A. Garcia
5th Congress; 1961–1965	Maximino A. Garcia
6th Congress; 1965–1969	Teodoro B. Galagar
7th Congress; 1969–1972	Teodoro B. Galagar

=== At-large (defunct) ===
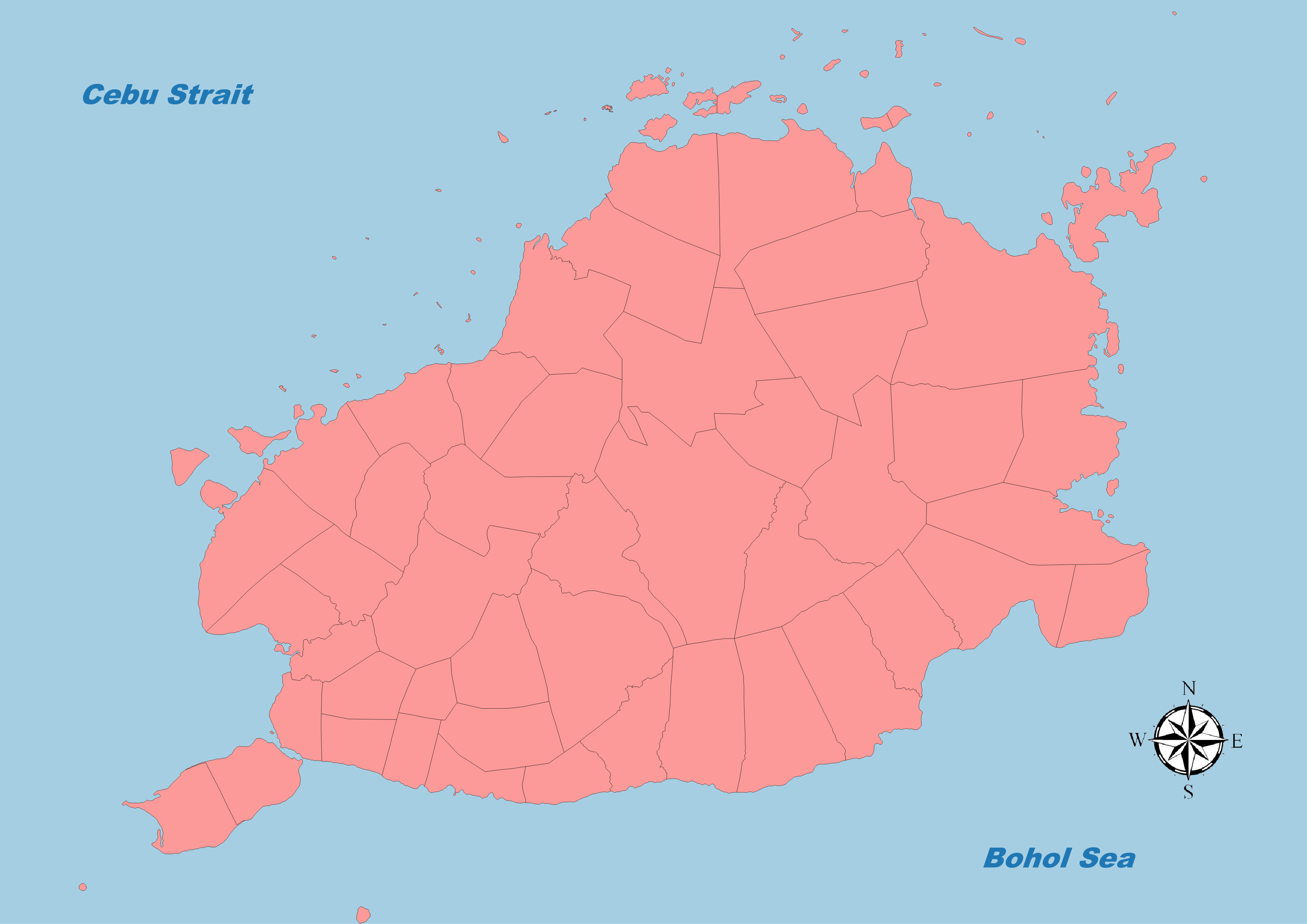
Map of Bohol District (at-large) 1943–1944 & 1984–1986

==== 1943-1944 ====
Period	Representative
National Assembly; 1943–1944	Vicente P. Bullecer
National Assembly; 1943–1944	Agapito Hontanosas (ex officio)

==== 1984-1986 ====
Period	Representative
Regular Batasang Pambansa; 1984–1986	Eladio I. Chatto
Regular Batasang Pambansa; 1984–1986	Ramon M. Lapez
Regular Batasang Pambansa; 1984–1986	David B. Tirol
