= Francisco Soriano =

Filipino politician (1869–1937)

The Honorable Francisco Soriano
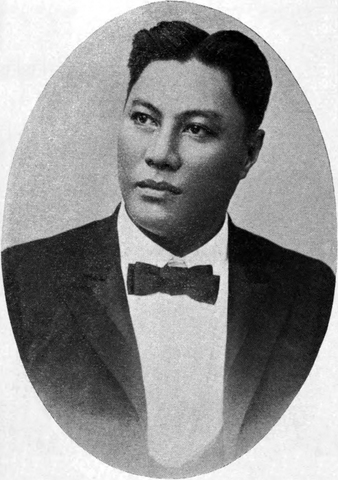
- Soriano as a member of the Philippine Assembly, 1908

Senator of the Philippines from the 8th district
- In office June 3, 1919 – June 2, 1925 Serving with José Clarín
- Preceded by: Nicolas Capistrano
- Succeeded by: Troadio Galicano

Member of the Philippine House of Representatives from Surigao's Lone district
- In office 1907–1909
- Preceded by: Position established
- Succeeded by: Manuel Gavieres

Personal details
- Born: October 4, 1869 Molo, Iloilo, Captaincy General of the Philippines
- Died: October 2, 1937 (aged 67)
- Party: Nacionalista (1919-1925); Progresista (1907-1909)
- Spouse: Rosario Jalandoni

Francisco Soriano y Guzmán (October 4, 1869 - October 2, 1937) was a Filipino politician.

== Biography ==
Francisco Soriano was born on October 4, 1869, in Molo, now a district of Iloilo City. He received his bachelor's degree in arts at the Ateneo Municipal de Manila in 1889 and studied law at the University of Santo Tomas, where he received his degree in civil law in 1898. In 1894, he received a degree in secondary education from the same university and while a student, opened high schools in Manila and Molo.

During the Philippine Revolution, he was appointed as the secretary-general of the government of the Federal State of the Visayas and was a member of the Judicial Committee of the revolutionary government in 1898.

During the American occupation, Soriano was appointed as prosecutor (fiscal) for Surigao and Misamis provinces in Mindanao in 1901. In 1907, Soriano was elected as a member of the Progresista Party to the newly established Philippine Assembly representing the at-large district of Surigao, serving until 1909. In 1919, Soriano was elected to the Senate of the Philippines representing the 11th senatorial district. He served until 1925.
