= 9th Philippine Legislature =

11th legislative term of the Philippines

←	8th	10th	→
- Old Legislative Building (c. 1988)

Overview
- Term: July 16, 1931 – May 5, 1934
- Governor-General: Dwight F. Davis (until January 9, 1932); George C. Butte (acting, January 9 – February 29, 1932); Theodore Roosevelt Jr. (February 29, 1932 – July 15, 1933); Frank Murphy (from July 15, 1933)

Senate
- Members: 24
- President: Manuel L. Quezon
- President pro tempore: Sergio Osmeña (until August 2, 1933); José Clarín (from August 2, 1933)
- Majority leader: Benigno Aquino Sr.
- Minority leader: Claro M. Recto

House of Representatives
- Members: 96
- Speaker: Manuel Roxas
- Speaker pro tempore: Antonio de las Alas (until January 25, 1933); Quintin Paredes (January 25 – July 24, 1933); Jose Zulueta (from July 24, 1933)
- Majority leader: Pedro Sabido

The 9th Philippine Legislature was the meeting of the legislature of the Philippines under the sovereign control of the United States from 1931 to 1934.

== Sessions ==
- First Regular Session: July 16 – November 9, 1931
- Second Regular Session: July 16 – November 8, 1932
- First Special Session: December 7 – 17, 1932
- Second Special Session: January 16 – 31, 1933
- Third Regular Session: July 17 – November 9, 1933
- Third Special Session: April 30 – May 5, 1934

== Party summary ==
Senate membership

Beginning of the Legislature

End of the Legislature

=== Senate ===
	Party (shading shows control)			Total	Vacant
	Nacionalista	Democrata	Independent	Total	Vacant
End of previous legislature	17	7	0	24	0
Begin	17	6	1	24	0
End	18	5	1	24	0
Final voting share	75%	20.8%	4.2%		
Beginning of next legislature	24 (Note: At the start of the 10th Philippine Legislature, the Nacionalista Party was split into the Democratico faction which had 16 seats, and the Pro-Independencia faction which had eight seats.)	0	0	24	0

House membership

Beginning of the Legislature

End of the Legislature

=== House of Representatives ===
	Party (shading shows control)					Total	Vacant
	Nacionalista	Democrata	Liberal	Sakdalista	Independent	Total	Vacant
End of previous legislature	74	12	—N/a	—N/a	8	94	0
Begin	78	9	1	—N/a	8	96	0
End	78	8	1	—N/a	9	96	0
Final voting share	81.3%	8.3%	1%	—N/a	9.4%		
Beginning of next legislature	93 (Note: At the start of the 10th Philippine Legislature, the Nacionalista Party was split into the Democratico faction which had 71 seats, and the Pro-Independencia faction which had 22 seats.)	0	0	3	0	96	0

== Leadership ==
=== Senate ===
Senate President

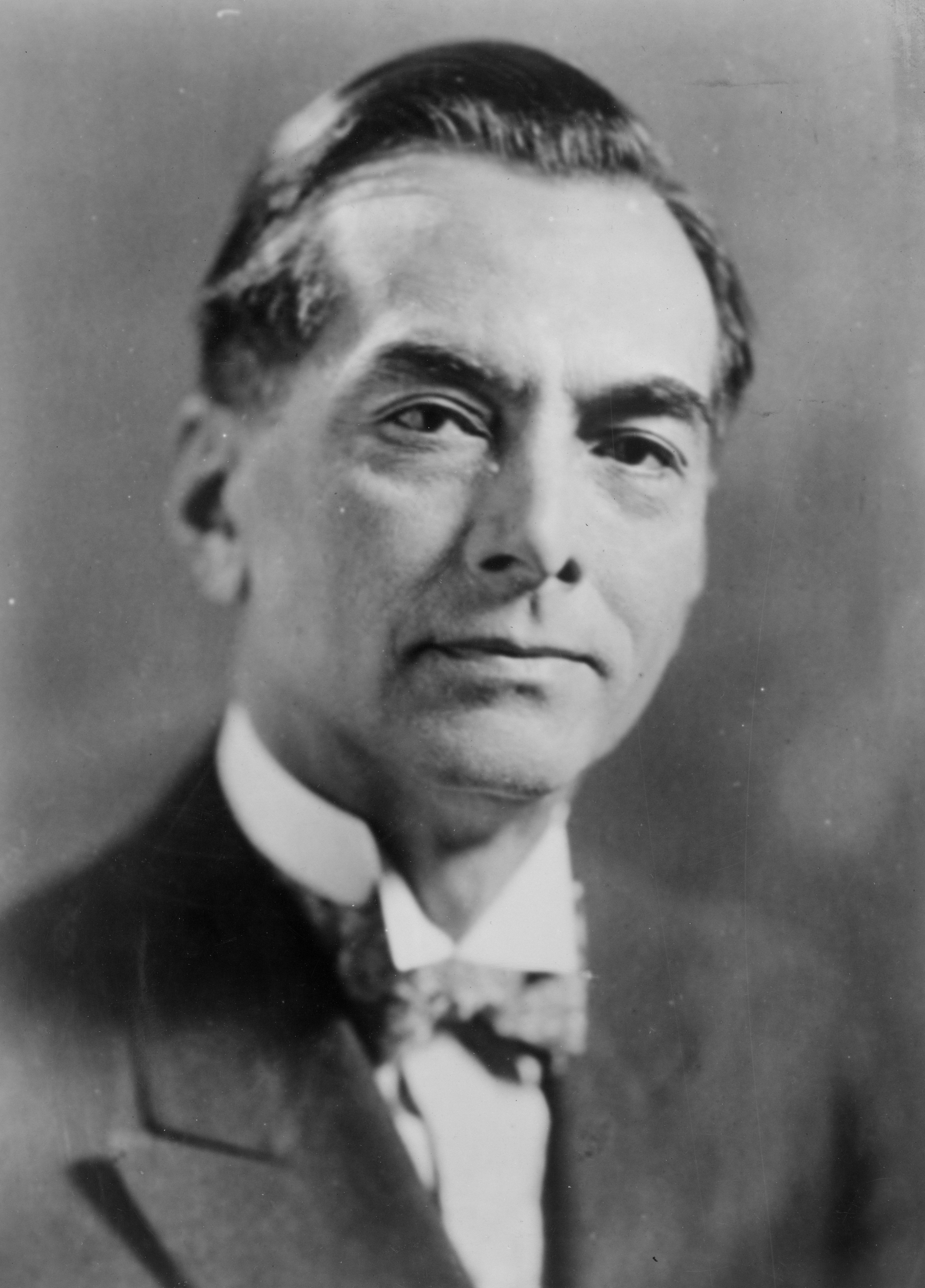
Manuel L. Quezon

- President: Manuel L. Quezon (5th District, Nacionalista)
- President pro tempore:
  - Sergio Osmeña (10th District, Nacionalista), until August 2, 1933
  - José Clarín (11th District, Nacionalista), from August 2, 1933
- Majority Floor Leader: Benigno Aquino Sr. (3rd District, Nacionalista)
- Minority Floor Leader: Claro M. Recto (5th District, Democrata)

=== House of Representatives ===
House Speaker

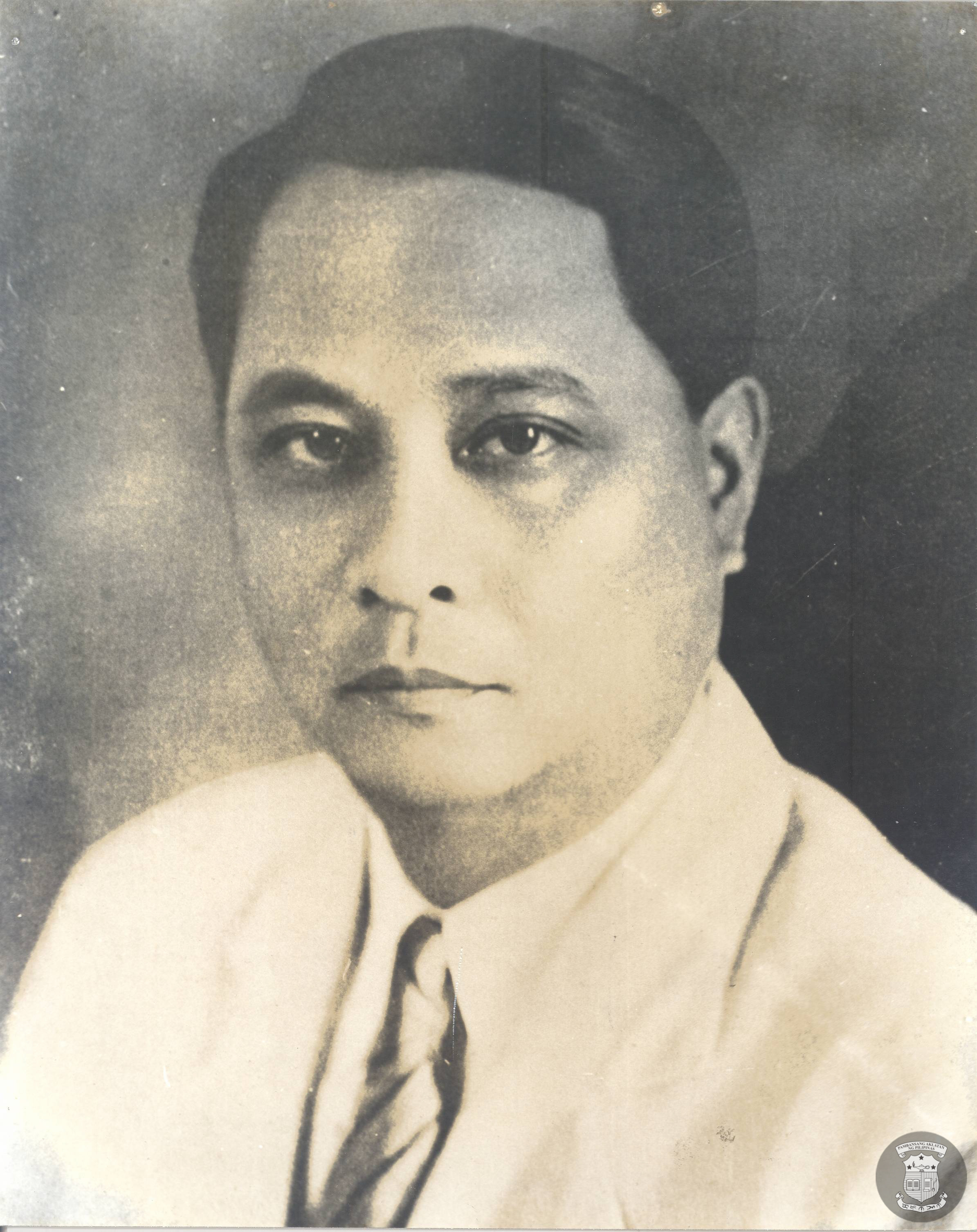
Manuel Roxas

- Speaker:
  - Manuel Roxas (Capiz–1st, Nacionalista), until August 23, 1933
  - Quintín Paredes (Abra, Nacionalista), from August 23, 1933
- Speaker pro tempore:
  - Antonio de las Alas (Batangas–1st, Nacionalista), until January 25, 1933
  - Quintín Paredes (Abra, Nacionalista), January 25 – July 24, 1933
  - Jose Zulueta (Iloilo–1st, Nacionalista), from July 24, 1933
- Majority Floor Leader: Pedro Sabido (Albay–3rd, Nacionalista)

== Members ==
=== Senate ===
The following are the terms of the elected senators of this Legislature, according to the date of election:

- For senators elected on June 5, 1928: June 5, 1928 – June 5, 1934
- For senators elected on June 2, 1931: June 2, 1931 – June 1, 1937

Senators of the 12th District were appointed for indefinite terms.

District	Term end	Senator	Party
1st District	1934	Melecio Arranz	Nacionalista
1st District	1937	Elpidio Quirino	Nacionalista
2nd District	1934	Teofilo Sison	Nacionalista
2nd District	1937	Alejo Mabanag	Democrata
3rd District	1934	Benigno Aquino Sr.	Nacionalista
3rd District	1937	Sotero Baluyut	Nacionalista
4th District	1934	Jose Generoso	Democrata
4th District	1937	Juan Nolasco	Nacionalista
5th District	1934	Manuel L. Quezon	Nacionalista
5th District	1937	Claro M. Recto	Democrata
6th District	1934	Jose Fuentebella	Nacionalista
6th District	1937	Juan B. Alegre (Note: Juan B. Alegre died on June 14, 1931.)	Democrata
6th District	1937	Jose O. Vera (Note: Jose O. Vera was elected on August 18, 1931, to succeed Juan B. Alegre.)	Nacionalista
7th District	1934	Antonio Bello	Nacionalista
7th District	1937	Ruperto Montinola	Democrata
8th District	1934	Francisco Zulueta	Nacionalista
8th District	1937	Gil Montilla	Nacionalista
9th District	1934	Jose Avelino	Nacionalista
9th District	1937	Jose Maria Veloso	Nacionalista
10th District	1934	Sergio Osmeña	Nacionalista
10th District	1937	Manuel Briones	Nacionalista
11th District	1934	Jose Clarin	Democrata
11th District	1937	Juan Torralba	Nacionalista
12th District	—	Ludovico Hidrosollo (Note: Appointed.)	Nacionalista
12th District	—	Jamalul Kiram II	Independent

=== House of Representatives ===
Province/City	District	Representative	Party
Abra	Lone	Quintin Paredes	Nacionalista
Albay	1st	Froilan Pavericio (Note: Froilan Pavericio died on August 9, 1931.)	Democrata
Albay	1st	Julian M. Locsin (Note: Julian M. Locsin was elected on September 3, 1931, to succeed Froilan Pavericio. He was later removed on January 31, 1933, after an electoral protest.)	Nacionalista
Albay	1st	Exequiel Kare (Note: Exequiel Kare replaced Julian M. Locsin on January 31, 1933, after winning an electoral protest.)	Nacionalista
Albay	2nd	Jose S. Valenciano	Nacionalista
Albay	3rd	Pedro Sabido	Nacionalista
Albay	4th	Pedro Vera	Nacionalista
Antique	Lone	Segundo Moscoso	Nacionalista
Bataan	Lone	Fortunato de Leon	Democrata
Batanes	Lone	Mariano Lizardo	Nacionalista
Batangas	1st	Antonio de las Alas (Note: Antonio de las Alas was appointed as Secretary of Public Works and Communications on February 18, 1933.)	Nacionalista
Batangas	1st	Ramon Diokno (Note: Ramon Diokno was elected on February 18, 1933, to succeed Antonio de las Alas.)	Nacionalista
Batangas	2nd	Meynardo M. Farol	Nacionalista
Batangas	3rd	Jose D. Dimayuga	Nacionalista
Bohol	1st	Jose Concon	Independent
Bohol	2nd	Marcelo S. Ramirez	Independent
Bohol	3rd	Filomeno Orbeta Caseñas	Independent
Bulacan	1st	Francisco Afan Delgado	Nacionalista
Bulacan	2nd	Jose de Leon Jr.	Nacionalista
Cagayan	1st	Marcelo Adduru	Nacionalista
Cagayan	2nd	Sabas Casibang	Nacionalista
Camarines Norte	Lone	Miguel Lukban	Nacionalista
Camarines Sur	1st	Mariano E. Villafuerte	Democrata
Camarines Sur	2nd	Severo Cea	Democrata
Capiz	1st	Manuel Roxas	Nacionalista
Capiz	2nd	Jose A. Dorado	Nacionalista
Capiz	3rd	Rufino L. Garde (Note: Rufino L. Garde was removed on January 23, 1932, after an electoral protest.)	Nacionalista
Capiz	3rd	Rafael Tumbokon (Note: Rafael Tumbokon replaced Rufino L. Garde on January 23, 1932, after winning an electoral protest.)	Nacionalista
Cavite	Lone	Emiliano Tria Tirona	Democrata
Cebu	1st	Buenaventura Rodriguez	Nacionalista
Cebu	2nd	Sotero Cabahug	Nacionalista
Cebu	3rd	Maximino Noel	Nacionalista
Cebu	4th	Juan Alcazaren	Nacionalista
Cebu	5th	Miguel Cuenco	Nacionalista
Cebu	6th	Miguel Raffiñan	Nacionalista
Cebu	7th	Paulino Ybañez	Nacionalista
Ilocos Norte	1st	Vicente T. Lazo	Nacionalista
Ilocos Norte	2nd	Emilio L. Medina	Nacionalista
Ilocos Sur	1st	Pedro Singson Reyes	Nacionalista
Ilocos Sur	2nd	Fidel B. Villanueva	Democrata
Iloilo	1st	Jose Zulueta	Nacionalista
Iloilo	2nd	Vicente R. Ybiernas	Nacionalista
Iloilo	3rd	Silvestre Villa	Nacionalista
Iloilo	4th	Tomas Buenaflor	Nacionalista
Iloilo	5th	Venancio Cudillo	Nacionalista
Isabela	Lone	Silvestre B. Macutay	Nacionalista
La Union	1st	Mariano Alisangco	Independent
La Union	2nd	Rodolfo Baltazar	Nacionalista
Laguna	1st	Feliciano Gomez	Nacionalista
Laguna	2nd	Arsenio Bonifacio	Nacionalista
Leyte	1st	Carlos Tan	Nacionalista
Leyte	2nd	Pacifico Ybañez	Nacionalista
Leyte	3rd	Tomas Oppus	Nacionalista
Leyte	4th	Cirilo Bayaya	Nacionalista
Leyte	5th	Ruperto Kapunan	Nacionalista
Manila	1st	Francisco Varona	Nacionalista
Manila	2nd	Prudencio A. Remigio	Liberal
Marinduque	Lone	Jose A. Uy	Nacionalista
Masbate	Lone	Pio V. Corpus	Nacionalista
Mindanao and Sulu	Lone	Agustin Luceo Alvarez	Nacionalista
Mindanao and Sulu	Lone	Francisco Bangoy	Nacionalista
Mindanao and Sulu	Lone	Datu Ibra Gundarangin	Independent
Mindanao and Sulu	Lone	Jose G. Sanvictores	Nacionalista
Mindanao and Sulu	Lone	Datu Sinsuat	Independent
Mindoro	Lone	Mariano P. Leuterio (Note: Mariano P. Leuterio died on April 23, 1932.)	Nacionalista
Mindoro	Lone	Juan L. Luna (Note: Juan L. Luna was elected on June 4, 1932, to succeed Mariano P. Leuterio.)	Nacionalista
Misamis	1st	José Ozámiz	Nacionalista
Misamis	2nd	Isidro Vamenta	Nacionalista
Mountain Province	Lone	Hilary Clapp	Nacionalista
Mountain Province	Lone	Juan Gaerlan	Independent
Mountain Province	Lone	Henry A. Kamora	Independent
Negros Occidental	1st	Enrique Magalona	Nacionalista
Negros Occidental	2nd	Ramon Torres	Nacionalista
Negros Occidental	3rd	Emilio Yulo	Nacionalista
Negros Oriental	1st	Guillermo Z. Villanueva	Nacionalista
Negros Oriental	2nd	Jose E. Romero	Nacionalista
Nueva Ecija	1st	Manuel V. Gallego	Nacionalista
Nueva Ecija	2nd	Felipe Buencamino Jr.	Nacionalista
Nueva Vizcaya	Lone	Domingo Maddela	Nacionalista
Palawan	Lone	Claudio R. Sandoval	Nacionalista
Pampanga	1st	Fabian de la Paz	Nacionalista
Pampanga	2nd	Zoilo Hilario	Nacionalista
Pangasinan	1st	Potenciano Pecson	Nacionalista
Pangasinan	2nd	Eugenio Perez	Nacionalista
Pangasinan	3rd	Antonio C. Mejia	Nacionalista
Pangasinan	4th	Eusebio V. Sison	Nacionalista
Pangasinan	5th	Juan G. Millan	Democrata
Rizal	1st	Pedro Magsalin	Nacionalista
Rizal	2nd	Eulogio Rodriguez	Democrata
Romblon	Lone	Leonardo Festin	Nacionalista
Samar	1st	Tiburcio Tancinco	Nacionalista
Samar	2nd	Serafin S. Marabut	Nacionalista
Samar	3rd	Gerardo Morrero	Nacionalista
Sorsogon	1st	Adolfo Gerona	Nacionalista
Sorsogon	2nd	Fernando B. Duran	Nacionalista
Surigao	Lone	Vicente Gonzaga	Nacionalista
Tarlac	1st	Alfonso A. Pablo	Nacionalista
Tarlac	2nd	Jose G. Domingo	Democrata
Tayabas	1st	Fabian R. Millar	Nacionalista
Tayabas	2nd	Marcelo T. Boncan	Nacionalista
Zambales	Lone	Gregorio Anonas (Note: Gregorio Anonas was appointed as an undersecretary in the Department of Public Works and Communications on March 1, 1933.)	Nacionalista
Zambales	Lone	Mariano Alisangco (Note: Mariano Alisangco was elected on April 1, 1933, to succeed Gregorio Anonas.)	Independent

== Changes in membership ==
=== Senate ===
District	Incumbent				Special election	Successor		
District	Senator	Party	Date	Reason	Special election	Senator	Party	Date
6th District	Juan B. Alegre	Democrata	June 14, 1931	Died in office	August 18, 1931	Jose O. Vera	Nacionalista	August 18, 1931

=== House of Representatives ===
District	Incumbent				Special election	Successor		
District	Member	Party	Date	Reason	Special election	Member	Party	Date
Albay–1st	Froilan Pavericio	Democrata	August 9, 1931	Died in office	September 3, 1931	Julian M. Locsin	Nacionalista	September 3, 1931
Capiz–3rd	Rufino L. Garde	Nacionalista	January 23, 1932	Removed after an electoral protest	—N/a	Rafael Tumbokon	Nacionalista	January 23, 1932
Mindoro–Lone	Mariano P. Leuterio	Nacionalista	April 23, 1932	Died in office	June 4, 1932	Juan L. Luna	Nacionalista	June 4, 1932
Albay–1st	Julian M. Locsin	Nacionalista	January 31, 1933	Removed after an electoral protest	—N/a	Exequiel Kare	Nacionalista	January 31, 1933
Batangas–1st	Antonio de las Alas	Nacionalista	February 18, 1933	Appointed Secretary of Public Works and Communications	February 18, 1933	Ramon Diokno	Nacionalista	February 18, 1933
Zambales–Lone	Gregorio Anonas	Nacionalista	March 1, 1933	Appointed undersecretary of Department of Public Works and Communications	April 1, 1933	Mariano Alisangco	Independent	April 1, 1933

== See also ==
- 1931 Philippine legislative election
  - 1931 Philippine Senate elections
  - 1931 Philippine House of Representatives elections
