= 1931 Philippine legislative election =

- June 2, 1931
- Senate election

11 of the 24 seats in the Philippine Senate
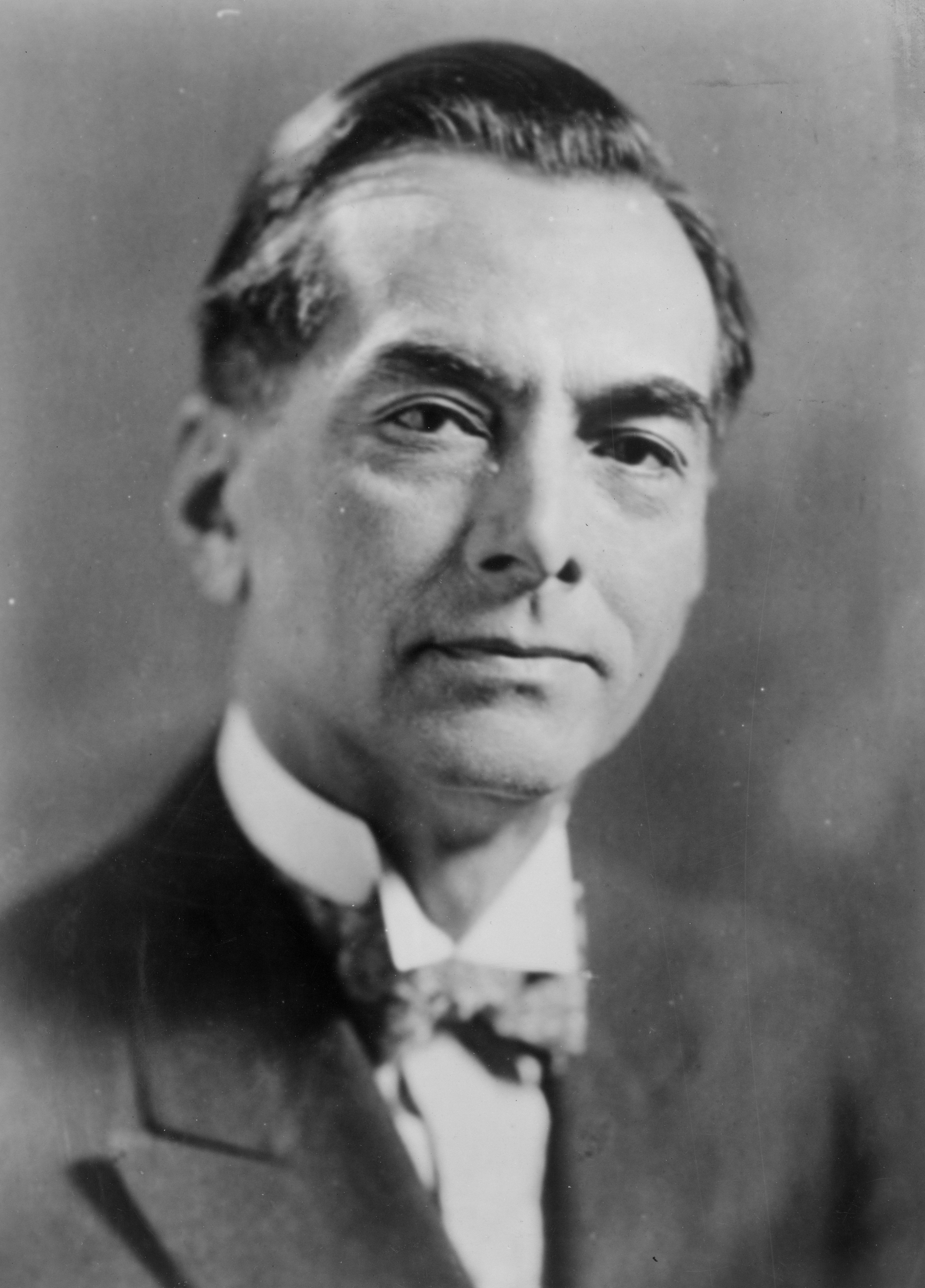

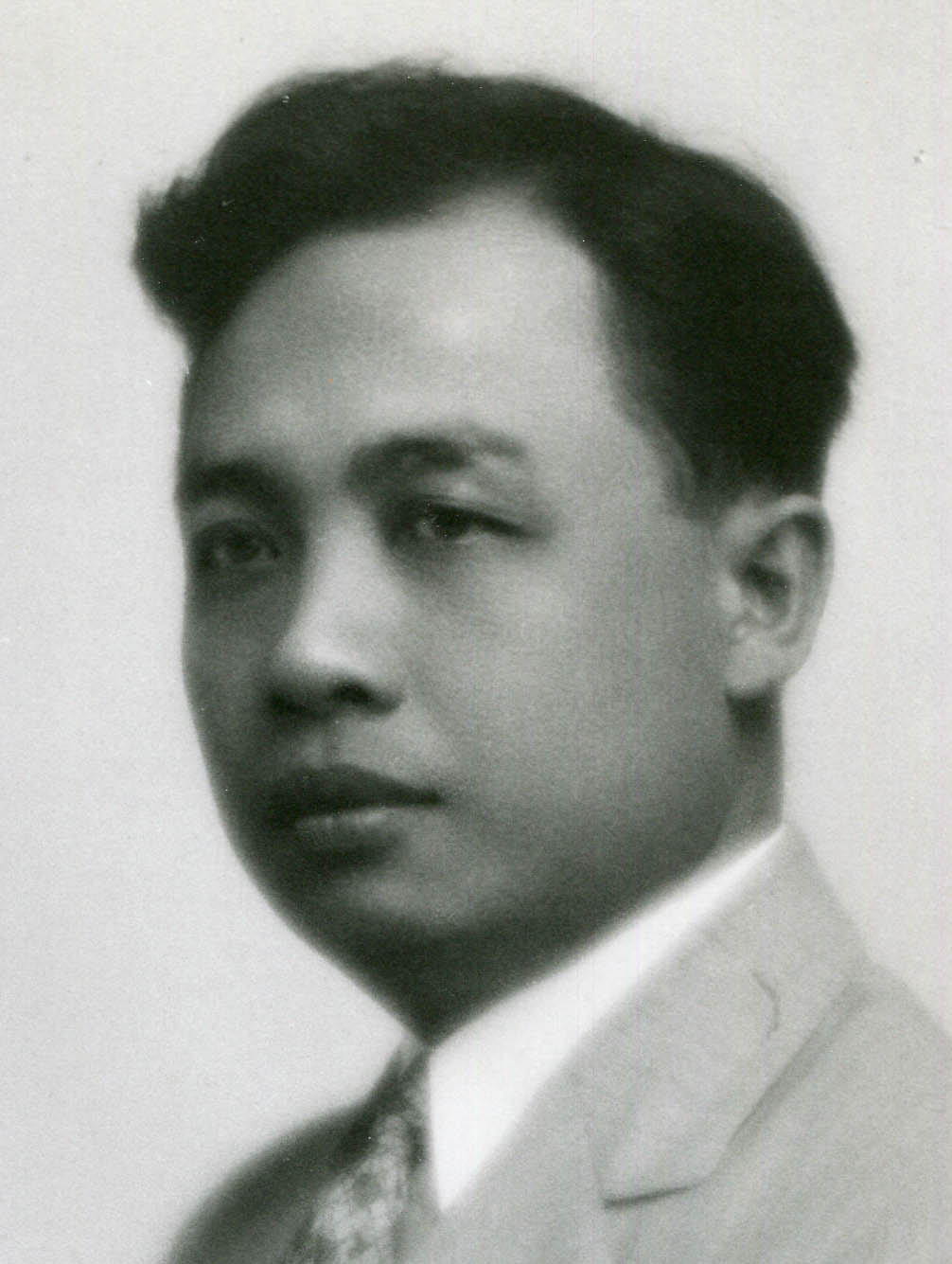
	First party	Second party
Leader	Manuel L. Quezon	Claro M. Recto
Party	Nacionalista	Democrata
Leader's seat	5th District	5th District
Seats before	17	6
Seats won	7	4
Seats after	17	6
Seat change	Steady	Steady
Senate President before election
Manuel L. Quezon
Nacionalista
Elected Senate President
Manuel L. Quezon
Nacionalista
- House of Representatives election

All 86 seats in the House of Representatives of the Philippines 44 seats needed for a majority
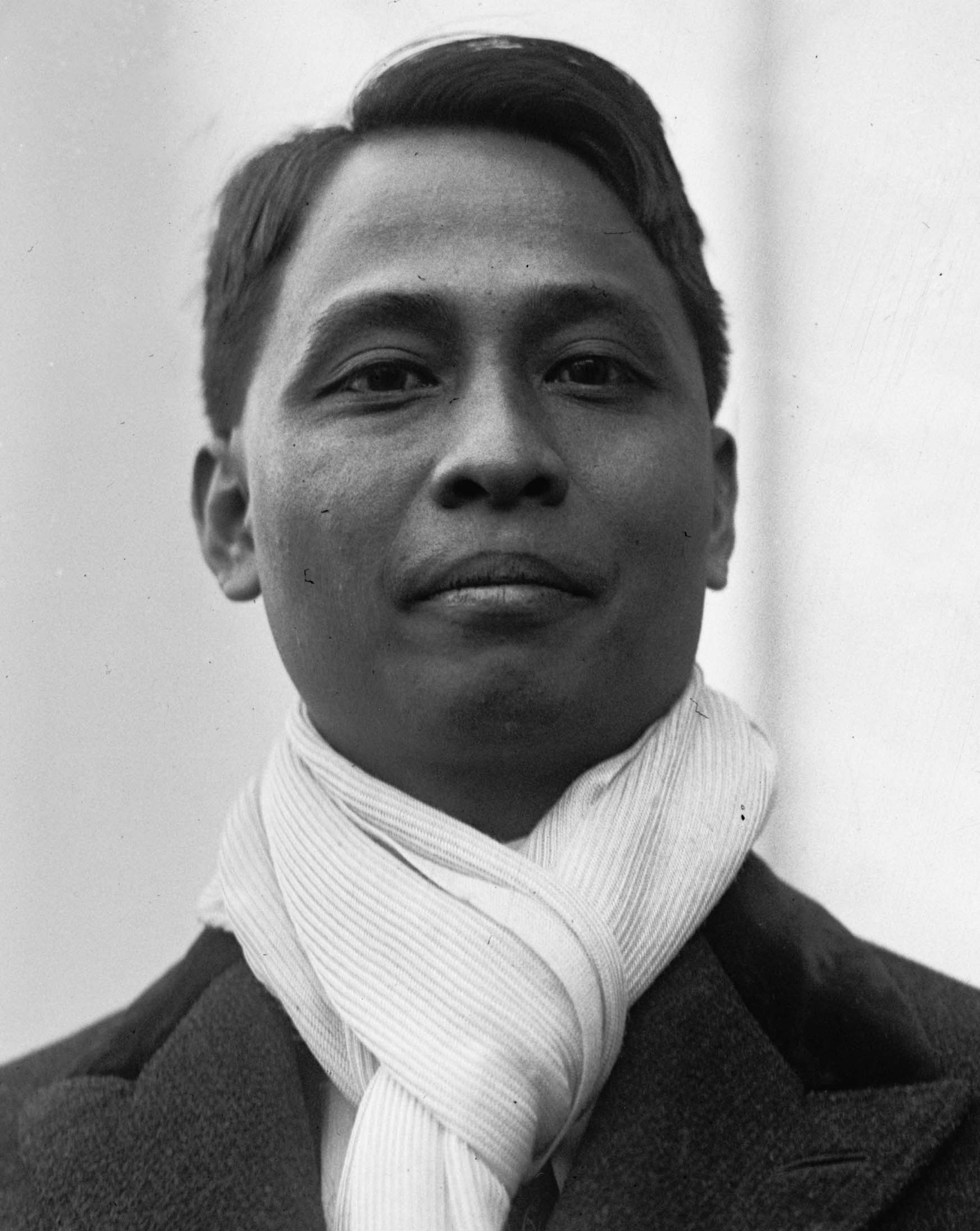

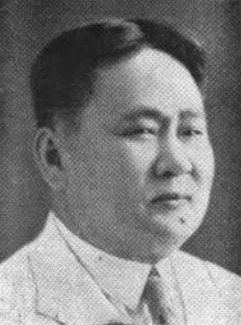
	First party	Second party
Leader	Manuel Roxas	Eulogio Rodriguez
Party	Nacionalista Consolidado	Democrata
Leader's seat	Capiz–1st	Rizal–2nd
Last election	71	16
Seats won	68	13
Seat change	▼3	▼3
Speaker before election
Manuel Roxas
Nacionalista
Consolidado
Elected Speaker
Manuel Roxas
Nacionalista
Consolidado

Elections for the Philippine Legislature were held on June 2, 1931, pursuant to Jones Law of 1916 which prescribed elections for every three years for both chambers of legislature. Voters elected all 86 members of the House of Representatives in the Philippine House of Representatives elections; and 11 out of 24 members of the Senate in the Philippine Senate elections.

== Background ==
The 1931 elections were contested during a period of political alignment inside Partido Nacionalista, as Filipino politicians sought to solve factional divisions that had merged during the 1920s. The Nacionalista Consolidado remained its dominance in political landscape entering the elections.

The election occurred during the renewed talks between Filipino leaders and United State for lobbying an independence bill, including its timeline. Legislative dominance of Nacionalista strengthen campaign for immediate independence during negotiations in Washington.

Also, the Philippines became affected by the Great Depression, which made independence movement pushed, with the reason that the economic dependence prevented long-term national development. With the economic problems surging, Filipino leaders faced pressure from left-wing peasants due to unrest in Central Luzon, with radical labor organizations arose, with communist organizations grow by 1930.

== Results ==
=== Senate results ===
↓

17	1	6
Nacionalista	I	Democrata

Party	Seats				
Party	Up	Before	Won	After	+/−
Nacionalista	7	16	7	16	0
Democrata	4	6	4	6	0
Appointed (Note: Of the two appointed senators, one was from the Nacionalista and one was independent.)	0	2	0	2	0
Total	11	24	11	24	0

=== House of Representatives results ===
↓

68	13	5
Nacionalista Consolidado	Democrata	IND

Party	Seats	+/–
Nacionalista Consolidado	68	−3
Democrata Party	13	−3
Independent	5	−2
Total	86	−8

== See also ==
- 9th Philippine Legislature
- 1931 Philippine Senate elections
- 1931 Philippine House of Representatives elections
