= Eutiquio Boyles =

Governor of Bohol, Philippines (1874–1955)

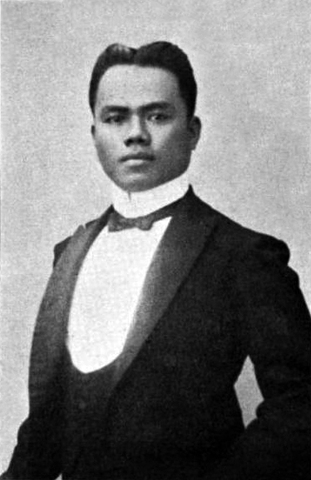
- Boyles as a member of the Philippine Assembly, 1908

6th Governor of Bohol
- In office October 16, 1916 – October 15, 1919
- Preceded by: Fernando G. Rocha
- Succeeded by: Juan Torralba

Member of the Philippine Assembly from Bohol's 3rd congressional district
- In office October 16, 1907 – October 16, 1912
- Preceded by: Office established
- Succeeded by: Juan Virtudes

Presidente Municipal of Ubay, Bohol
- In office 1902–1906
- Preceded by: Ruperto Gaviola
- Succeeded by: Ruperto Gaviola

Personal details
- Born: Eutiquio Boyles; November 21, 1874 Ubay, Bohol, Captaincy General of the Philippines
- Died: January 15, 1955 (aged 80) Mabini, Bohol, Philippines
- Party: Independent
- Spouse: Gabina del Valle
- Children: Filomena Boyles
- Education: University of San Carlos (High School); University of Santo Tomas (AB)
- Occupation: Politician
- Profession: Agriculturist

Eutiquio Boyles (November 21, 1874 – January 15, 1955) was a Filipino politician who was the 6th Governor of Bohol from 1916 to 1919, presidente municipal of Ubay, Bohol from 1902 to 1906, and a member of the Philippine Assembly from Bohol's 3rd congressional district from 1907 to 1912.

== Early life ==
Boyles, also known as Inko Okoy or Wenceslao Reyes, was born in Sitio Bood (now Barangay Bood), Ubay, Bohol, on November 21, 1874. Born out of wedlock, he was brought up by his mother, Nicasia Boyles. His father was Francisco Reyes. His paternal great-grandmother, Berudja Reyes, was a survivor of the aftermath of the Dagohoy revolution.

Boyles left home for Cebu to pursue higher education, which was uncommon at the time. He worked for rich families to afford his education. He enrolled in the night high school of San Carlos Seminary and later obtained the Spanish degree of "Titulo de Maestro."

His father, Francisco Reyes, later provided financial support for Boyles' education and sent him to Manila. Boyles was later admitted and enrolled at the Universidad de Santo Tomas. He completed his "Bacheller en Artes" at the same university.

After he graduated, Boyles returned to his hometown in Ubay. With his completed education, he was appointed municipal secretary by the presidente municipal of Ubay. Afterwards, he was appointed inspector of customs at the major Port of Ubay.

During the American occupation of the Philippines, he assumed a post as justice of the peace (Juez de Paz) of Ubay until 1902. He was later succeeded by his half-brother Nicanor Reyes.

In the 1902 municipal election, he was elected presidente municipal (mayor) of Ubay, becoming the chief executive of his hometown. He only served for one term in the office until 1906.

After his stint as presidente municipal, his constituents encouraged him to run for assemblyman in the inaugural Philippine Legislature, which was established through the Philippine Organic Act of 1902. He agreed to run as an independent candidate, and was elected the first assemblyman of the third district of Bohol on July 30, 1907. The third district was then composed of 12 large municipalities, which includes the entire eastern half of Bohol, from Valencia to barangay Pangpang (now municipality of Buenavista), Getafe. He successfully ran for a second term during the 1909 Philippine Assembly elections.

In the 1916 Philippine general election, Boyles ran and was elected governor of Bohol, becoming the 6th elected chief executive of the province. He served in the office for one term, from October 16, 1916, to October 15, 1919.

After his term as governor, he was appointed Director of the Bureau of Non-Christian Tribes of the Philippines and served from 1919 to 1923.

== Personal life ==
He married Gabina del Valle, and they had one daughter, Filomena.

== Later life ==
Boyles retired from politics and later engaged in farming and guano harvesting at Pupog Cave in Mabini, Bohol. He eventually expanded his business in his hometown in Sitio Bood (now barangay Bood), in Ubay, Bohol until the Second World War.

He died on January 15, 1955, at the age of 80.

== Legacy ==
In 1965, barangay Sampongon was renamed Governor Boyles in his honor, as he was the first elected governor of Bohol from the municipality of Ubay.

Political offices
Preceded by Ruperto Gaviola	Presidente Municipal, Ubay, Bohol; 1902–1906	Succeeded by Ruperto Gaviola
Preceded by Fernando G. Rocha	Governor, Province of Bohol; 1916–1919	Succeeded by Juan Torralba
House of Representatives of the Philippines
Preceded by Office established	Representative, 3rd District of Bohol; 1907–1912	Succeeded by Juan Virtudes
