= Juan Torralba =

Filipino politician and lawyer (1883-1961)

The Honourable Juan Sarmiento Torralba
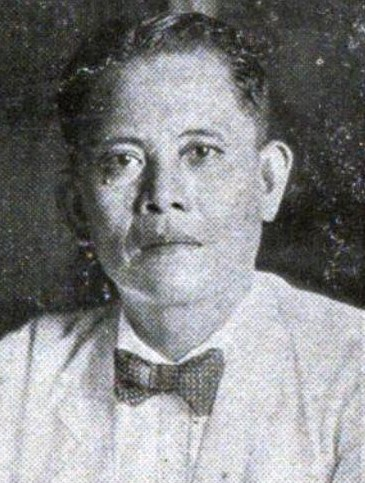
- Senatorial portrait of Torralba, published by Benipayo Press, c. 1935

Senator of the Philippines from the 11th District
- In office 2 June 1931 – 16 September 1935 Serving with Jose Clarin
- Preceded by: Troadio Galicano
- Succeeded by: office abolished

Member of the National Assembly of the Philippines from Bohol's 1st district
- In office 16 September 1935 – 30 December 1938
- Preceded by: Bernardo Josol
- Succeeded by: Genaro Visarra

7th Governor of Bohol
- In office 16 October 1919 – 15 October 1925
- Preceded by: Eutiquio Boyles
- Succeeded by: Filomeno Orbeta Caseñas

Personal details
- Born: March 7, 1883 Tagbilaran, Bohol, Captaincy General of the Philippines
- Died: January 3, 1961 (aged 77)
- Party: Nacionalista

Juan Sarmiento Torralba (March 7, 1883 – January 3, 1961) was a Filipino politician and lawyer. He was governor of Bohol from 1919 to 1925. Afterwards, Torralba was a senator from 1931 to 1935 and a deputy on behalf of Bohol from 1935 to 1938.

== Biography ==
Juan Torralba was born in Tagbilaran, Bohol to Margarito Maturan Torralba and Cirila Butalid Sarmiento. Torralba completed a bachelor's degree in law from the Escuela de Derecho and was admitted to the Bar on October 11, 1909.

From 1919 to 1925, Torralba was governor of Bohol. In the 1931 election, he was elected to the Senate of the Philippines from the 11th District. After the Commonwealth Constitution was passed in 1935, the Senate was abolished and replaced by the unicameral National Assembly of the Philippines. Torralba was elected to that Assembly to represent Bohol's 1st district in the 1935 elections, serving until 1938. He subsequently practiced law.

A brother of Juan Torralba, Fermin Torralba, was also a politician and was secretary of the Senate while he was in office.
