= José Clarín =

Filipino politician (1879–1935)

The Honorable José Clarín
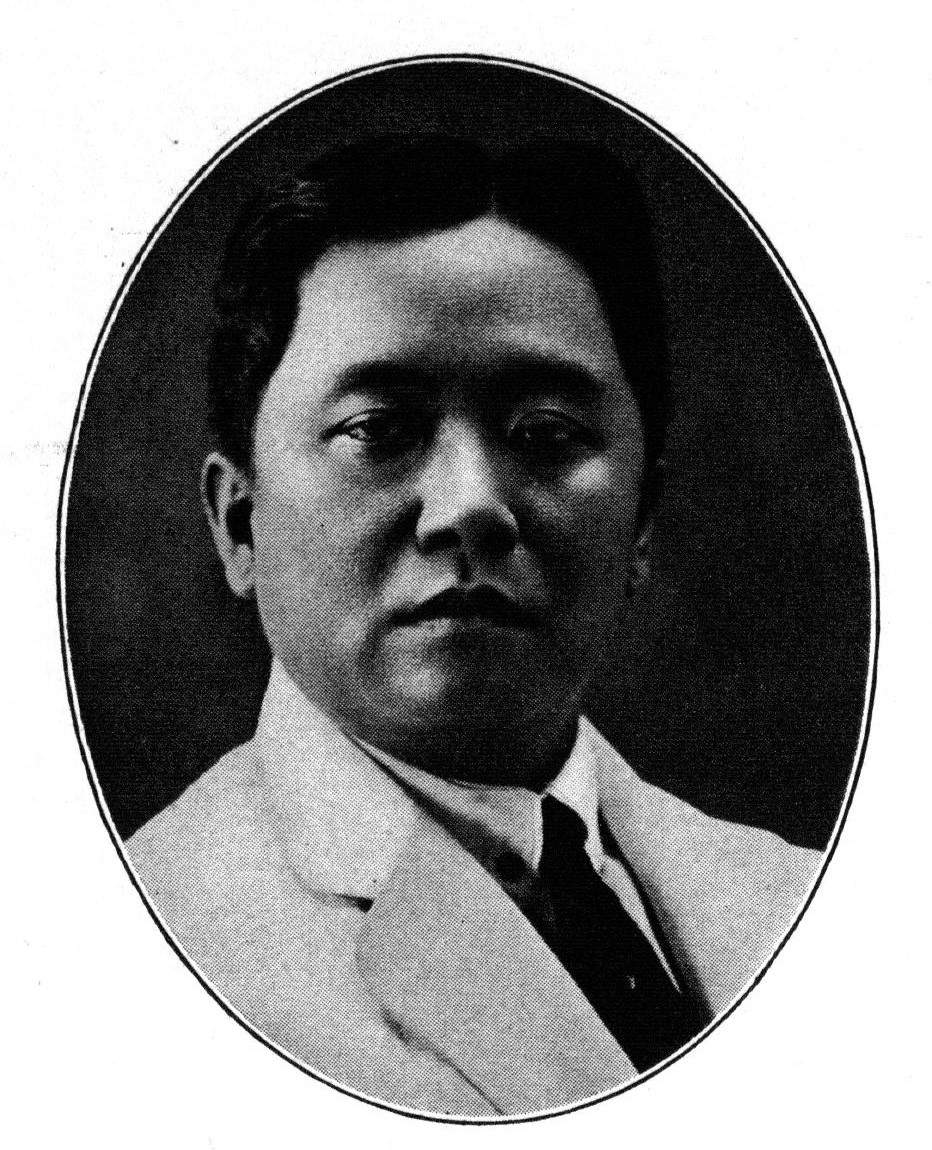
- Official portrait, c. 1917

President pro tempore of the Senate of the Philippines
- In office August 2, 1933 – June 2, 1935
- Preceded by: Sergio Osmeña
- Succeeded by: José Avelino

Senator of the Philippines from the 11th district
- In office October 16, 1916 – June 2, 1935 Serving with Nicolas Capistrano (1916-1919), Francisco Soriano (1919-1925), Troadio Galicano (1925-1931), Juan Torralba (1931-1935)
- Preceded by: Post established
- Succeeded by: Post abolished

Member of the Philippine House of Representatives from Bohol's 2nd district
- In office 1907–1916
- Preceded by: Post established
- Succeeded by: Macario Lumain

Delegate to the 1934 Constitutional Convention
- In office 1934–1935

Personal details
- Born: José Aniceto Clarín y Butalid; December 12, 1879 Tagbilaran, Bohol, Captaincy General of the Philippines
- Died: June 2, 1935 (aged 55) Manila, Philippine Islands
- Cause of death: Lung cancer
- Party: Nacionalista

José Aniceto Clarín y Butalid (December 12, 1879 – June 2, 1935) was a Filipino politician and the 3rd president pro tempore of the Senate of the Philippines from 1934 until his death in 1935. He was also acting Senate President of the Philippines briefly in 1932 when Senate President Manuel Quezon went on leave.

He was elected in the 1934 Philippine Constitutional Convention election as a delegate from Bohol, Philippines. He died while in office as Senate President pro tempore on June 2, 1935, of lung cancer.

== Biography ==
Clarín was born on December 12, 1879, in Tagbilaran, Bohol, to Don Aniceto Velez Clarín, first civil governor of the province of Bohol. Clarín was educated at the University of San Carlos in Cebu for his primary education and then in Escuela de Derecho de Manila for his law degree earned in 1904. After his studies, he settled in Cebu and worked for his profession. One of the cases he handled as a lawyer were the kidnappings committed by the captain of a large American frigate in Cebu.

=== Philippine Assembly ===
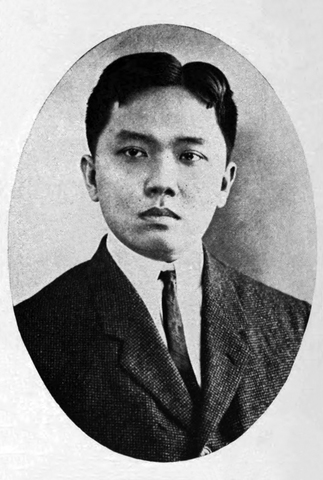
Clarín as a member of the Philippine Assembly, 1908

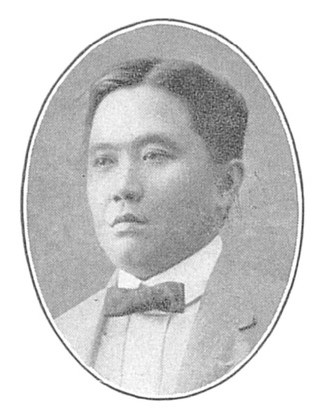
Clarín as a member of the Philippine Assembly, 1913

Clarin would also serve the Philippine Legislature in 1907. As a legislator under the Philippine Assembly, he, along with Carlos Ledesma, advocated for the law on absolute divorce. Aside from that, Clarin also authored the Resolution no. 17. This resolution requested for the American government to admit young Filipinos to the Naval Academy in Annapolis.

==== Relocation of poor Filipinos ====
Assembly Bill 39, introduced by Clarin on November 12, 1907, aimed to relocate poor Filipinos to Mindoro and Palawan for land settlement. Eligible applicants, aged at least sixteen and in economic hardship, were to receive support like food and medical services, with a proposed budget of 100,000 pesos. The Commission rejected the bill, which Clarin proposed to reduce the number of Filipinos emigrating to Hawaii and promote economic growth in underpopulated areas.

A year-and-a-half later, Clarin introduced Assembly Bill 394 of 1909, which was almost the same as Assembly Bill 39. This time the bill was aimed to relocate poor Filipinos to the island of Mindoro and three provinces of Mindanao, particularly in Misamis, Surigao, and Agusan. This bill was rejected by the Philippine Commission for several reasons. According to the commission:

- Palawan should have been included
- not all provinces supported out-migration
- the four provinces that did were too far apart for effective management
- there was little chance for individuals to repay their debts; and
- the responsibilities of the assigned place were unclear

The Commission noted technical problems and suggested that further consideration be given in the next session. Clarin then authored Assembly Bill 209 on November 26, 1912, with the same title as bill 394. Although it passed in the Assembly, it was also rejected by the commission.

=== As senator ===
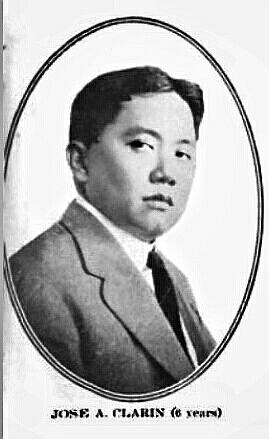
Clarin depicted in a publication of Philippine Education, published April 1917

As a senator, the bills he sponsored introduced regulations for the admission of foreigners to Philippine citizenship. In 1917, he served under the Senate Committee on Finance and was chairperson for the Senate Committee on Relations with the Sovereign Country. Since 1932, Clarin also served as acting senate president when Senate President Manuel Quezon was on leave.

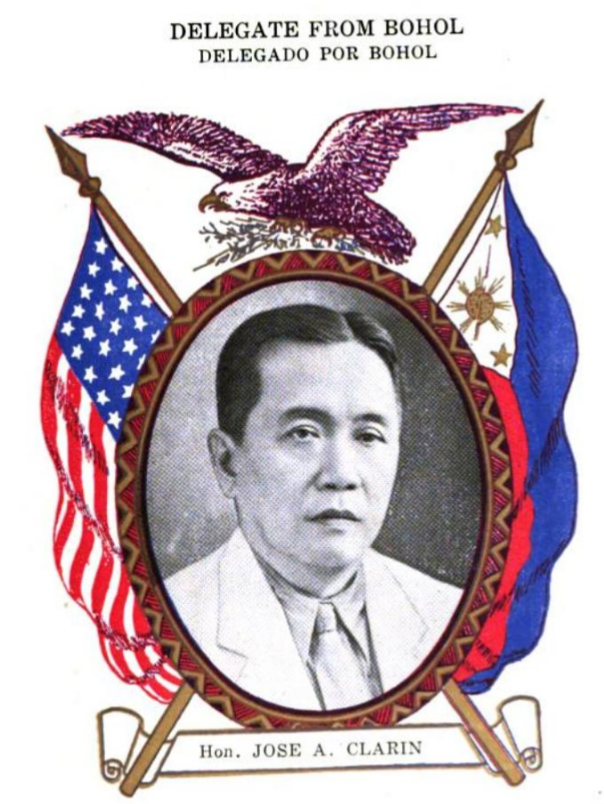
Clarin as a delegate to the Philippine Constitutional Convention (c. 1935)

In 1934, he became a delegate to the Constitutional Convention from the second district of Bohol and a member of the committee on sponsorship. He was Senate President pro tempore for the 10th Philippine Legislature from 1934 to 1935. He remained as a member of the Philippine Senate until his sudden death in 1935.

He died in June 1935 of lung cancer, which he had for two months before his death.

Carlos P. Garcia, who was then Governor of Bohol, dubbed Clarin as the "idol of the 11th senatorial district". The town of Clarin in Misamis Occidental is named in his honor.

== Controversy ==
In 1910, there were protests made within the Philippine Assembly against the membership of Clarin representing Bohol. However, these protests were dismissed.

During his time in the Assembly, there were numerous attempts to unseat him.

== Personal life ==
Clarin was never married.

His younger brother, Olegario Clarin, was also a senator and representative of Bohol.

== See also ==
- List of Philippine legislators who died in office
