= Nicolas Capistrano =

Filipino politician and revolutionary general

Nicolás Capistrano
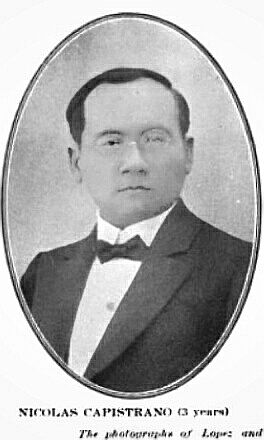
- Capistrano depicted in a publication of Philippine Education, published April 1917

Senator of the Philippines from the 11th District
- In office October 16, 1916 – June 3, 1919 Serving with Jose Clarin
- Preceded by: district established
- Succeeded by: Francisco Soriano

Member of the House of Representatives from Misamis's 2nd District
- In office 1909–1912
- Preceded by: Manuel Corrales
- Succeeded by: Ramon Neri

Personal details
- Born: January 7, 1864 Angat, Bulacan, Captaincy General of the Philippines
- Died: Cagayan de Oro, Misamis Oriental, Philippines
- Party: Nacionalista

Nicolás Capistrano y Fernández (January 7, 1864 – unknown) was a Filipino lawyer, politician and revolutionary general who fought against the Americans from 1899 to 1901 during the Philippine-American War and was later elected as a congressman and senator of the Philippines.

== Early life and education ==
Nicolás Capistrano y Fernández was born on January 7, 1864, in Angat, province of Bulacan in Luzon, to Francisco Capistrano, a gobernadorcillo of that town, and Juana Fernandez. He was the third among 11 siblings. After his studies at the Colegio de San Juan de Letran, he obtained a Bachelor of Arts degree at the University of Santo Tomas. In 1893, he successfully completed a bachelor's degree in law at the same educational institution. In 1894, Capistrano became a member of the Philippine Bar. From 1890 to 1896, he was principal of a private school in Manila.

== Military career ==
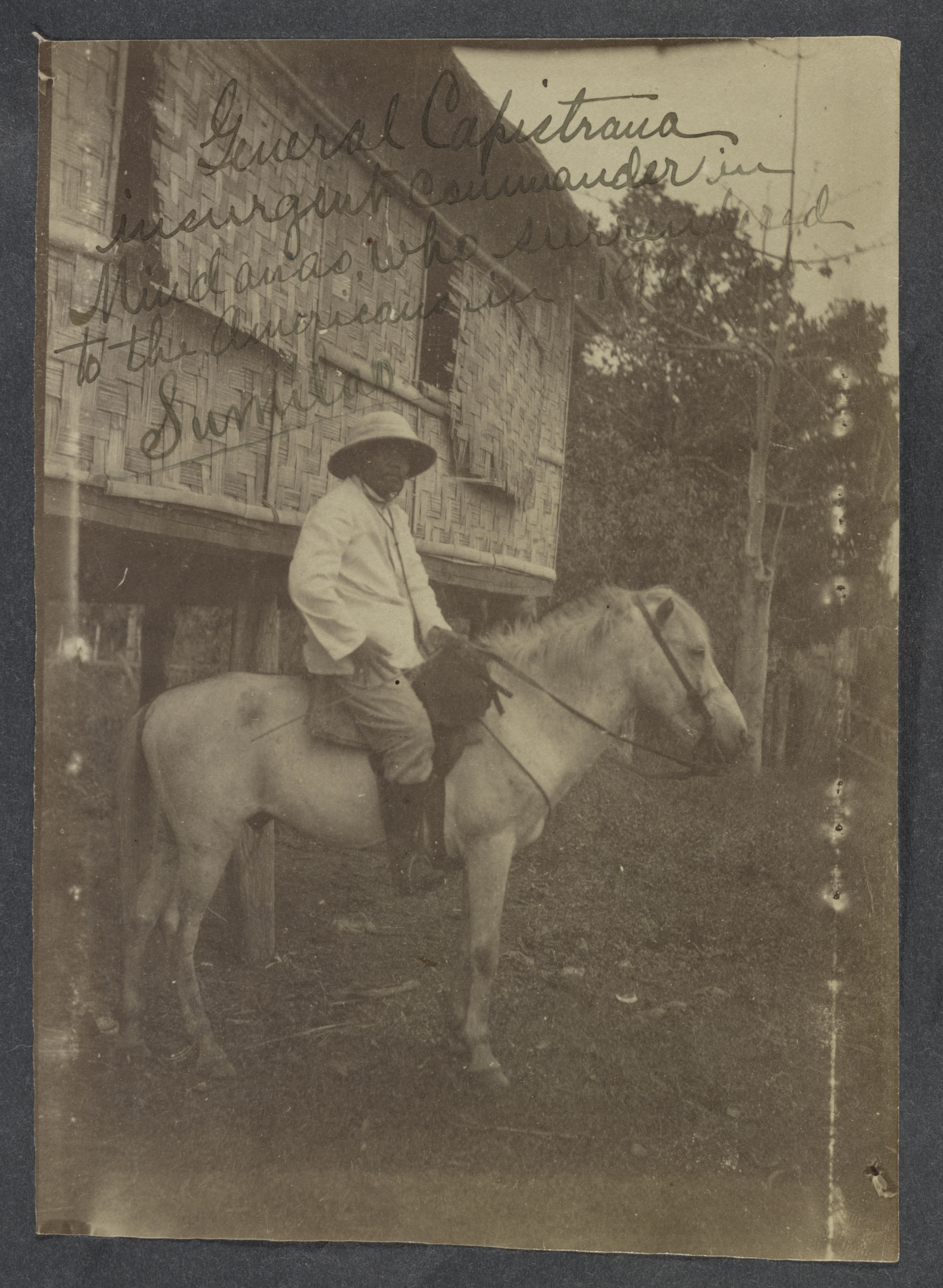
Capistrano in 1899

Fearing arrest by Spanish colonial authorities for his involvement in revolutionary activities, he moved to Mindanao some time after 1895, becoming the Registrar of Deeds of the province of Misamis. From 1899 until his surrender in April 1901, Capistrano led the revolutionary government and army in Misamis during the Philippine-American War, participating in several battles such as that of Cagayan de Misamis, Agusan Hill and Macahambus Hill. from his base in Bukidnon.

== Political career ==
From 1901 to 1906, Capistrano was the prosecutor or fiscal for Misamis. From 1906 to 1907, he was appointed as a member of the board of the said province. In 1909, Capistrano was elected to the House of Representatives as the representative of the Second legislative district of Misamis. He was re-elected to the same position in 1912. Capistrano was elected to the Philippine Senate in 1916 as one of the representatives of the eleventh senatorial district. Because he got fewer votes than Jose Clarin in the said district, he served a three-year term from 1916 to 1919.

=== Relocation of poor Filipinos to Mindanao ===
Direct challenges to the Philippine Commission's authority regarding Mindanao continued without pause in the Philippine Assembly beginning in the late 1900s to the early 1910s. In 1910, Assembly Bill 181, aiming to promote migration to the island, was co-authored by Capistrano and Deogracias Reyes. This bill targeted the poor with property valued under 500 pesos, intending to enhance their welfare, specifically directing migration to Mindanao. The Committee on Affairs related to the Moro Province rejected the bill, noting it infringed on their jurisdiction. Despite this, Capistrano, a Misamis native and chair of the Committee for Mindanao Affairs, persisted in defending the bill, even questioning the Philippine Organic Act of 1902.

== Personal life ==
Capistrano married Cecilia Trinidad of Santa Cruz, Manila in 1895 and had nine children. He resided at a seaside hacienda in Gusa, Cagayan de Oro.

== Legacy ==
A street in Cagayan de Oro was renamed in his honor.
