= Philippines's 11th senatorial district =

- Former constituency for the Senate of the Philippines
- Provinces / Cities: Bohol, Misamis Occidental, Misamis Oriental, Surigao
- Population: 876,400 (1935)
- Electorate: 124,520 (1935)

Former constituency
- Created: 1916
- Abolished: 1934

Philippines's 11th senatorial district, officially the Eleventh Senatorial District of the Philippine Islands (Spanish: Undécimo Distrito Senatorial de las Islas Filipinas), was one of the twelve senatorial districts of the Philippines in existence between 1916 and 1935. It elected two members to the Senate of the Philippines, the upper chamber of the bicameral Philippine Legislature under the Insular Government of the Philippine Islands for each of the 4th to 10th legislatures. The district was created under the 1916 Jones Law from the central Visayas province of Bohol and the northern Mindanao provinces of Misamis and Surigao. Misamis was split into the provinces of Misamis Occidental and Misamis Oriental in 1929.

The district was represented by a total of five senators throughout its existence. It was abolished in 1935 when a unicameral National Assembly was installed under a new constitution following the passage of the Tydings–McDuffie Act which established the Commonwealth of the Philippines. Since the 1941 elections when the Senate was restored after a constitutional plebiscite, all twenty-four members of the upper house have been elected countrywide at-large. It was last represented by José Clarín and Juan Torralba of the Nacionalista Democrático.

== List of senators ==
Seat A							Legislature	Seat B						
#	Image	Senator	Term of office		Party	Electoral history	Legislature	#	Image	Senator	Term of office		Party	Electoral history
#	Image	Senator	Start	End	Party	Electoral history	Legislature	#	Image	Senator	Start	End	Party	Electoral history
1		José Clarín	October 16, 1916	June 2, 1935	Nacionalista	Elected in 1916.	4th	1		Nicolas Capistrano	October 16, 1916	June 3, 1919	Nacionalista	Elected in 1916.
1		José Clarín	October 16, 1916	June 2, 1935	Nacionalista	Elected in 1916.	5th	2		Francisco Soriano	June 3, 1919	June 2, 1925	Nacionalista	Elected in 1919.
1		José Clarín	October 16, 1916	June 2, 1935	Nacionalista; Unipersonalista	Re-elected in 1922.	6th	2		Francisco Soriano	June 3, 1919	June 2, 1925	Nacionalista; Unipersonalista	Elected in 1919.
1		José Clarín	October 16, 1916	June 2, 1935	Nacionalista; Consolidado	Re-elected in 1922.	7th	3		Troadio Galicano	June 2, 1925	June 2, 1931	Demócrata	Elected in 1925.
1		José Clarín	October 16, 1916	June 2, 1935	Nacionalista; Consolidado	Re-elected in 1928.	8th	3		Troadio Galicano	June 2, 1925	June 2, 1931	Demócrata	Elected in 1925.
1		José Clarín	October 16, 1916	June 2, 1935	Demócrata	Re-elected in 1928.	9th	4		Juan Torralba	June 2, 1931	September 16, 1935	Nacionalista; Consolidado	Elected in 1931.
1		José Clarín	October 16, 1916	June 2, 1935	Nacionalista; Democrático	Re-elected in 1934. Died.	10th	4		Juan Torralba	June 2, 1931	September 16, 1935	Nacionalista; Democrático	Elected in 1931.

== See also ==
- Senatorial districts of the Philippines
