= Olegario Clarin =

Filipino politician (born 1892)

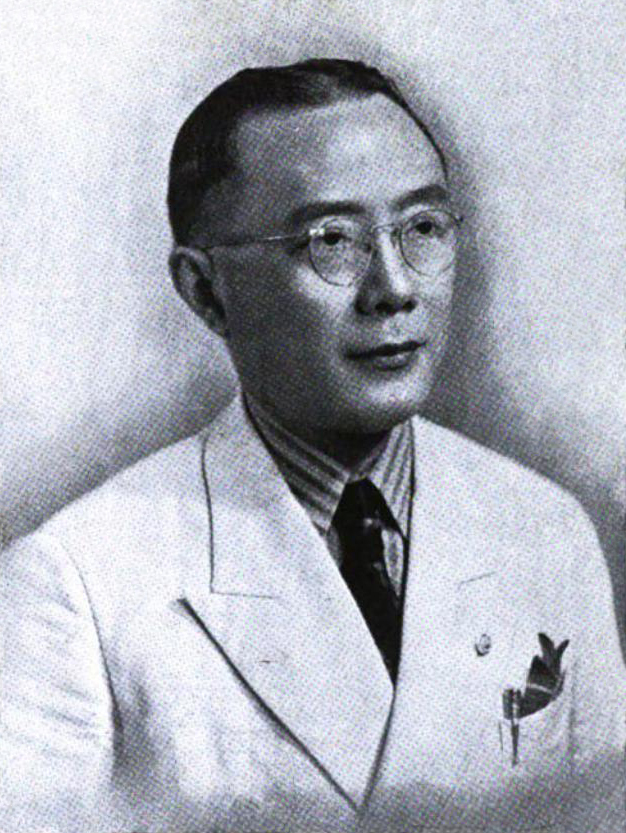
- Photograph from The Commercial & Industrial Manual of the Philippines, 1941

Senator of the Philippines
- In office 25 May 1946 – 30 December 1949

Member of the Philippine House of Representatives from Bohol's 2nd district
- In office 16 September 1935 – 25 May 1946
- Preceded by: Macario Falcon
- Succeeded by: Simeon Toribio
- In office 5 June 1925 – 5 June 1928
- Preceded by: Cornelio Sarigumba
- Succeeded by: Marcelo Ramirez

Personal details
- Born: Olegario Clarín y Butalid; March 6, 1892 Loay, Bohol, Captaincy General of the Philippines
- Party: Liberal (1946-????)
- Other political affiliations: Nacionalista (1925-1946)

Olegario Butalid Clarin (born Olegario Clarín y Butalid; March 6, 1892 – ) was a Filipino politician. He served as a representative from Bohol from 1925 through 1927, from 1935 to 1945 and was elected to a term in the Senate of the Philippines in 1946 after World War II.

== Biography ==
Olegario Clarin was born on March 6, 1892, in Loay, Bohol. His parents were Representative Aniceto Clarin and Margarita Butalid. He was a younger brother of Senator Jose Clarin. After graduating from Cebu High School and Liceo de Manila, Clarin studied law at the Philippine Law School and National University, eventually earning a bachelor's degree in law.

In 1925, Clarin was elected to the House of Representatives as a delegate from Bohol's 2nd district, serving until 1927. In 1932, Clarin was appointed Registrar of Deeds in Bohol. Three years later, he was elected as a delegate to the new unicameral National Assembly of the Philippines. In 1939 he was re-elected. After the Assembly was split again into the House of Representatives and the Senate in 1941, Clarin was again elected to the House.

Shortly after the elections, however, the Japanese invaded the Philippines as part of the Second World War. For this, the newly elected Philippine Congress only went into session in 1945 after the liberation of the country by the Americans. In the first elections after gaining independence in 1946, Clarin was elected to the Senate of the Philippines. His term in the Senate lasted until 1949.
