= Fermín Torralba =

Filipino lawyer and politician (1891–1939)

The Honourable Fermín Sarmiento Torralba
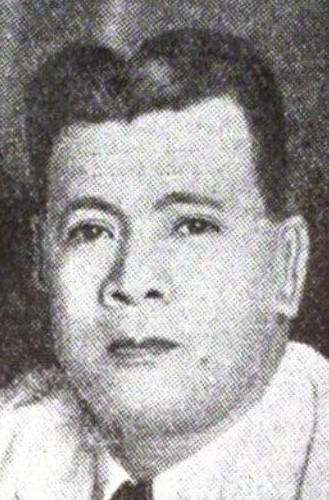

Member of the Philippine Legislature from the 1st district of Bohol
- In office June 6, 1922 – June 5, 1928
- Preceded by: Celestino Gallares
- Succeeded by: José Concón

4th Secretary of the Senate of the Philippines
- In office 1933–1935
- Preceded by: Faustino Aguilar
- Succeeded by: Felix Lazo

Personal details
- Born: Fermín Torralba y Sarmiento; July 7, 1891 Tagbilaran, Bohol, Captaincy General of the Philippines
- Died: 1939 (aged 47–48) Tagbilaran, Bohol, Philippine Commonwealth
- Party: Nacionalista
- Spouse: Rosario Dizon
- Education: University of Michigan
- Occupation: Lawyer

Fermín Sarmiento Torralba (born Fermín Torralba y Sarmiento; July 7, 1891 – 1939) was a Filipino lawyer and politician. He was a member of the Philippines Legislature from 1922 to 1928 and was Secretary of the Philippine Senate from 1931 to 1935. He was a member of the Nacionalista Party.

== Early life and education ==
Fermín Torralba was born in Tagbilaran, Bohol to Margarito Torralba y Maturan (c. 1856 – January 11, 1929 in Tagbilaran, Bohol) and Cirila Sarmiento y Butalid. He received an LL.B. degree from the University of Michigan.

== Political career ==
Torralba was elected to the Philippines Legislature in 1922 as representative from the 1st district of Bohol and was re-elected in 1925. He was elected Secretary of the Philippine Senate in 1933, serving in the Ninth and Tenth Legislatures.
