= Carlos P. Garcia =

President of the Philippines from 1957 to 1961

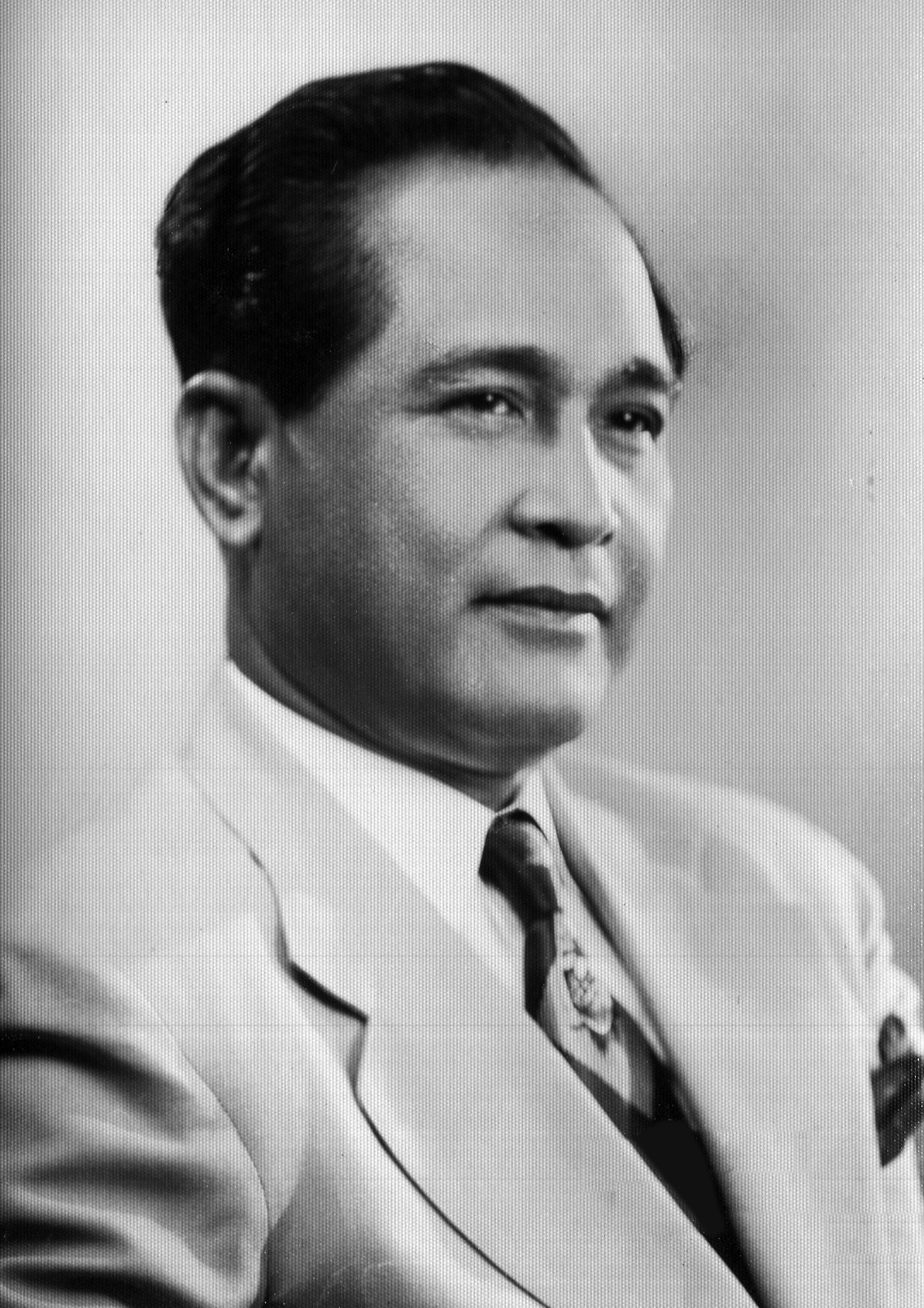
- Official portrait, 1957

8th President of the Philippines
- In office March 18, 1957 – December 30, 1961
- Vice President: None (March 18 – December 30, 1957); Diosdado Macapagal (1957–1961)
- Preceded by: Ramon Magsaysay
- Succeeded by: Diosdado Macapagal

1st President of the 1971 Philippine Constitutional Convention
- In office June 1, 1971 – June 14, 1971
- President: Ferdinand Marcos
- Succeeded by: Diosdado Macapagal

4th Vice President of the Philippines
- In office December 30, 1953 – March 18, 1957
- President: Ramon Magsaysay
- Preceded by: Fernando Lopez
- Succeeded by: Diosdado Macapagal

Secretary of Foreign Affairs
- In office December 30, 1953 – August 22, 1957
- President: Ramon Magsaysay (1953–1957); Himself (1957)
- Preceded by: Joaquín Miguel Elizalde
- Succeeded by: Felixberto Serrano

Senator of the Philippines
- In office May 25, 1945 – December 30, 1953

10th Governor of Bohol
- In office December 30, 1933 – December 30, 1941
- Preceded by: Celestino B. Gallares
- Succeeded by: Agapito Y. Hontanosas Sr.

Member of the House of Representatives from Bohol's 3rd district
- In office June 2, 1925 – June 2, 1931
- Preceded by: Teodoro Abueva
- Succeeded by: Filomeno Orbeta Caseñas

Personal details
- Born: Carlos García y Polestico; November 4, 1896 Talibon, Bohol, Captaincy General of the Philippines, Spanish East Indies
- Died: June 14, 1971 (aged 74) Quezon City, Philippines
- Resting place: Libingan ng mga Bayani, Taguig, Metro Manila, Philippines
- Party: Nacionalista (1925–1971)
- Spouse: Leonila Dimataga (m. 1933)
- Children: Linda Garcia-Campos
- Education: Silliman University; Philippine Law School (National University) (LL.B)
- Profession: Lawyer

Carlos Polestico García KR (Tagalog: [ˈkaːɾ.los poˌlɛːs.tɪˈxo gɐɾˈsiː.ɐ]; November 4, 1896 – June 14, 1971), often referred to by his initials CPG, was the eighth president of the Philippines, serving from 1957 to 1961. He served as the fourth vice president of the Philippines from 1953 to 1957.

A lawyer by profession, Garcia entered politics when he became the representative of Bohol’s third district in the House of Representatives. He then served as a senator from 1945 to 1953.

He was the Nacionalista's nominee for vice president as the running mate of Ramon Magsaysay in the presidential election of 1953, which they won. After the death of Magsaysay in 1957, he succeeded to the presidency, winning a full term in his own right in the presidential election that same year. He was subsequently defeated by his vice president Diosdado Macapagal in the 1961 presidential election.

== Early life and education ==
Garcia was born in Talibon, Bohol, Philippines, on November 4, 1896, to Policronio Garcia and Ambrosia Polestico, who were both natives of Bangued, Abra.

Garcia grew up with politics, with his father serving as a municipal mayor for four terms. He acquired his primary education in his native town Talibon, then took his secondary education in Cebu Provincial High School, now Abellana National School, both at the top of his class. Initially, he pursued his college education at Silliman University in Dumaguete, Negros Oriental, and later studied at the Philippine Law School, then the College of Law of National University, where he earned his law degree in 1923 and later, where he was awarded the honorary degree Doctor of Humanities, Honoris Causa from the National University in 1961. He also received an honorary doctorate degree from Tokyo University in Japan. He was among the top ten law students in the 1923 bar examination.

Rather than practicing law right away, he worked as a teacher for two years at Bohol Provincial High School. He became famous for his poetry in Bohol, where he earned the nickname "Prince of Visayan Poets" and the "Bard from Bohol."

== Political career ==
Garcia entered politics in 1925, scoring an impressive victory to become representative of the third district of Bohol. He was elected for another term in 1928 and served until 1931. He was elected governor of Bohol in 1933, but served only until 1941 when he successfully ran for Senate, but he was unable to serve due to the Japanese occupation of the Philippines during World War II. He assumed the office when Congress re-convened in 1945 after Allied liberation and the end of the war. When he resumed duties as senator after the war, he was chosen Senate majority floor leader. The press consistently voted him as one of the most outstanding senators. Simultaneously, he occupied a position in the Nacionalista Party.

== Vice-presidency (1953–1957) ==
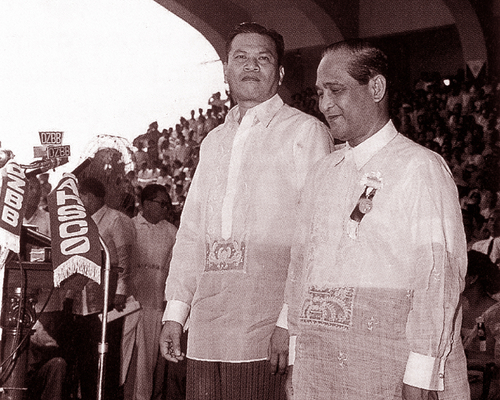
Garcia (right) and Magsaysay (left)

Garcia was the running mate of Ramon Magsaysay in the 1953 presidential election in which both men won. He was appointed secretary of foreign affairs by President Magsaysay, and for four years served concurrently as vice-president.

Garcia acted as chairman of the eight-nation Southeast Asian Security Conference held in Manila in September 1954, which led to the development of the Southeast Asia Treaty Organization (SEATO).

== Presidency (1957–1961) ==
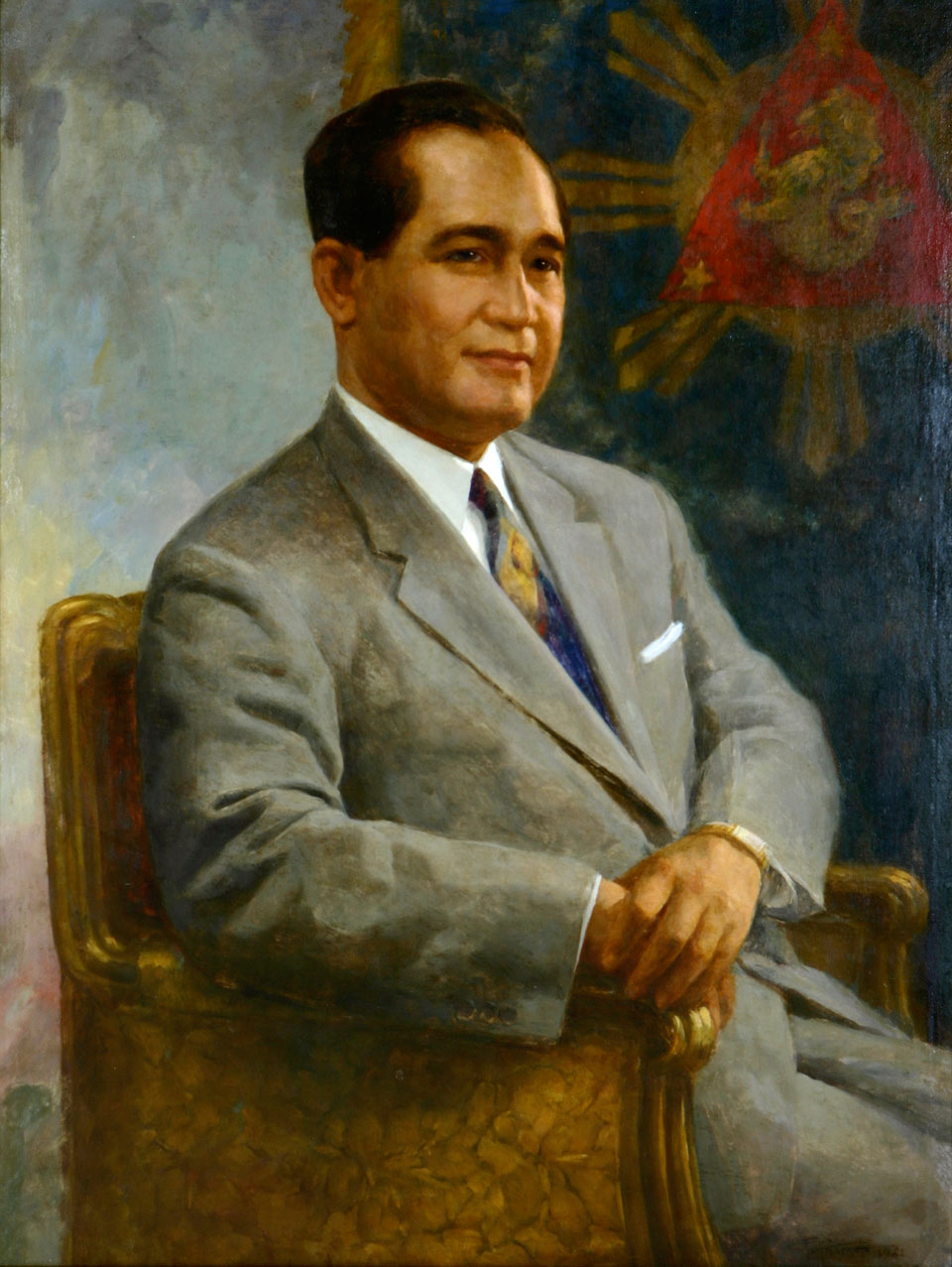
Official Malacañang Portrait by Fernando Amorsolo

Presidential styles of Carlos P. Garcia
- Reference style: His Excellency
- Spoken style: Your Excellency
- Alternative style: Mr. President

Economy of the Philippines under President Carlos Garcia 1957–1961
Population
- 1957: $\approx$ 22.68 million

Gross Domestic Product (1985 constant prices)
- 1957: ▲ Ph₱ 189,457 million ($94.7 billion)
- 1961: ▲ Ph₱ 224,430 million ($85.0 billion)
- Growth rate, 1957-61: 4.6%

Per capita income (1985 constant prices)
- 1957: ▲ Ph₱ 8,353
- 1961: ▼ Ph₱ 7,927

Total exports
- 1957: ▲ Ph₱ 35,980 million
- 1961: ▲ Ph₱ 39,845 million

Exchange rates
- 1 US US$ = Ph₱ 2.64; 1 Ph₱ = US US$ 0.38
- Sources: Philippine Presidency Project; Malaya, Jonathan; Eduardo Malaya. So Help Us God... The Inaugurals of the Presidents of the Philippines. Anvil Publishing, Inc.

=== Accession ===
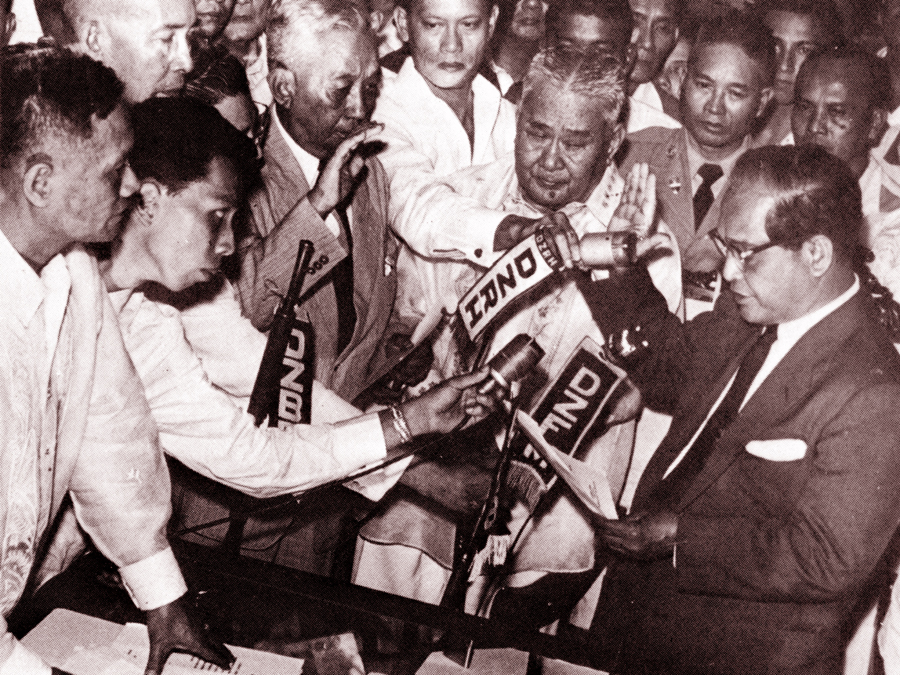
Vice President Carlos P. Garcia (right) was sworn in as president upon Magsaysay's death at the Council of State Room in the Executive Building of the Malacañan Palace complex. The oath of office was administered by Chief Justice Ricardo Paras.

At the time of President Magsaysay's sudden death due to an airplane crash on March 17, 1957, Garcia was heading the Philippine delegation to the SEATO conference then being held at Canberra, Australia. Having been immediately notified of the tragedy, Vice President Garcia enplaned back for Manila. Upon his arrival, he directly reported to Malacañang Palace to assume the duties of president. Chief Justice Ricardo Paras of the Supreme Court administered the oath of office, which took place at 5:56 PM PHT on March 18, 1957. President Garcia's first actions were to declare a period of national mourning and to preside over the burial ceremonies for Magsaysay.

=== 1957 presidential election ===
President Garcia won a full term as president with a landslide win in the national elections of November 12, 1957. Garcia, the Nacionalista candidate, garnered around 2.07 million votes or 41% of the total votes counted, defeating his closest rival, Jose Y. Yulo of the Liberal Party. His running mate, House Speaker Jose B. Laurel Jr., lost to Pampanga first district Representative Diosdado Macapagal. This was the first time in Philippine electoral history where a president was elected by a plurality rather than a majority, and in which the winning presidential and vice-presidential candidates came from different parties. Garcia took his oath of office on December 30, 1957, at the Independence Grandstand in Manila, commencing his second consecutive and only full term. The oath of office was administered by Chief Justice Ricardo Paras. Juan Pajo, the then-governor of Bohol, held the Bible which Garcia took oath on, breaking the tradition wherein it is held by presidential spouses.

=== Anti-communism ===
After much discussion, both official and public, the Congress of the Philippines, finally approved a bill outlawing the Philippine Communist Party. Despite the pressure exerted against the congressional measure, Garcia signed the aforementioned bill into law as Republic Act No. 1700 or the Anti-Subversion Act on June 19, 1957.

The act was superseded by Presidential Decree No. 885, entitled "Outlawing Subversive Organization, Penalizing Membership Therein and For Other Purposes", and was later amended by Presidential Decree No. 1736 and later superseded by Presidential Decree No. 1835, entitled, "Codifying The Various Laws on Anti-Subversion and Increasing the Penalties for Membership in Subversive Organization." This, in turn, was amended by Presidential Decree No. 1975. On May 5, 1987, Executive Order No. 167 repealed Presidential Decrees No. 1835 and No. 1975 as being unduly restrictive of the constitutional right to form associations.

However this was eventually repealed on September 22, 1992 with Republic Act No. 1700, during the administration of Fidel V. Ramos, which legalized the Communist Party of the Philippines, other underground movements and subversion, although sedition remained a crime.

=== Economy ===
The Garcia administration's pro-nationalist stance on the country's economy was disliked by foreign countries especially by the United States. To counter Garcia's economic controls, as early as 1957, the International Monetary Fund (IMF) pressured the Philippines that if the country did not lift their controls, then the Philippines shall not receive any loans from the IMF. According to central bank governor Miguel Cuaderno Sr., the United States rejected the Philippines' request for a stabilization loan of 25 million USD. The passage of the Filipino First Policy further worsened the relations of the U.S. with the Philippines.

==== Filipino First policy ====
Garcia exercised the "Filipino First Policy", for which he was known. This policy heavily favored Filipino businessmen over foreign investors. He was also responsible for changes in retail trade which greatly affected the Chinese businessmen in the country. In his speech as senator during a joint session of Congress on September 18, 1946, Garcia said the following:

We are called upon to decide on this momentous debate whether or not this land of ours will remain the cradle and grave, the womb and tomb of our race – the only place where we can build our homes, our temples, and our altars and where we erect the castles of our racial hopes, dreams and traditions and where we establish the warehouse of our happiness and prosperity, of our joys and sorrows.

Despite deteriorating relations with the U.S. as a result of this policy, the Philippines utilized it to induce industrialization and put Filipinos in control of industry and economy. The Philippines' manufacturing sector grew to 29 percent per year from 1949 to 1960. The manufacturing sector was considered the fastest growing sector accounting for 8.1 percent of the Philippine economy in 1949 to 17.7 percent by 1960. During his term, a wider push for machinery was introduced, especially by nationalist entrepreneurs and the industrial working class.

=== Foreign relations ===
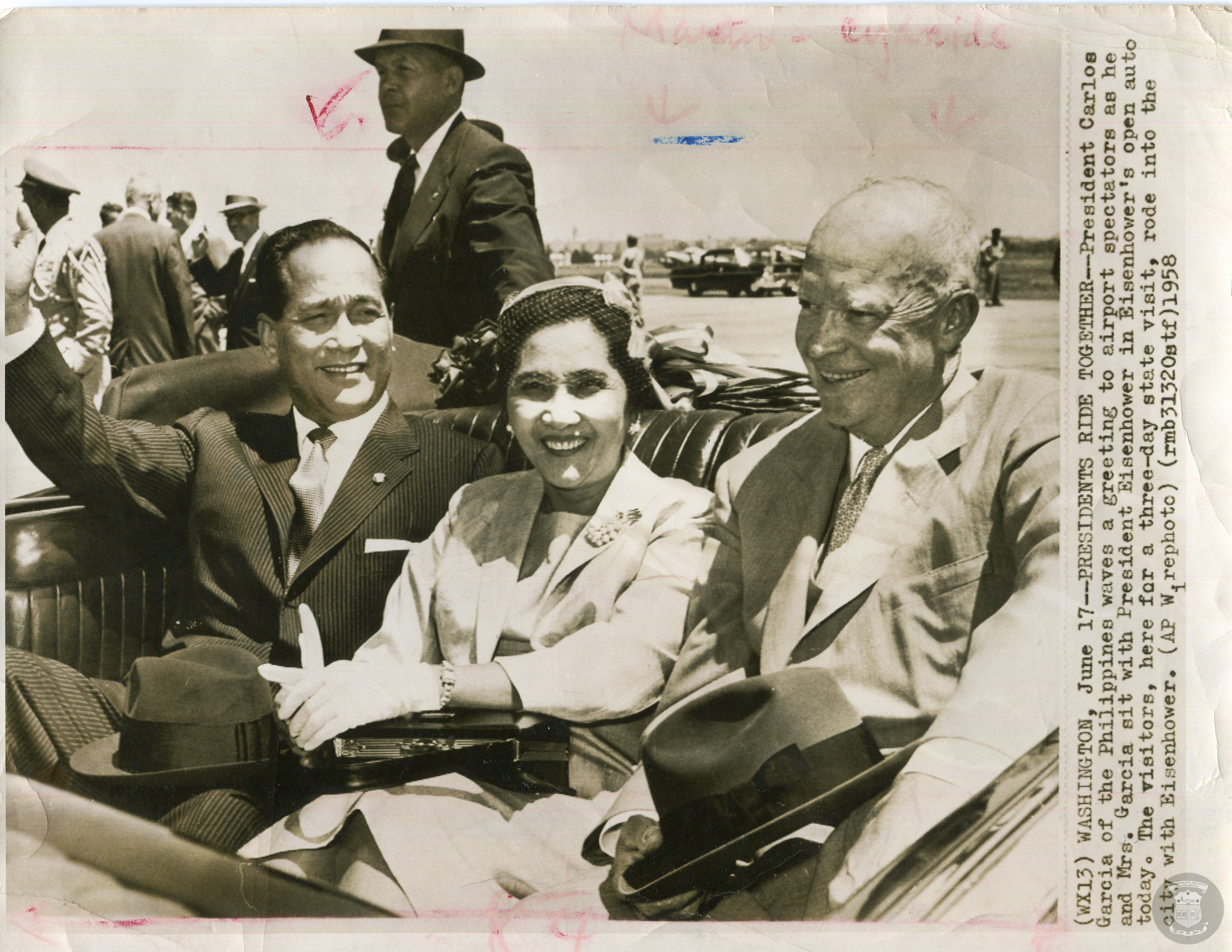
Pres. Garcia (left) with First Lady Leonila Garcia and US President Dwight Eisenhower (right) in 1960.

Unlike his predecessor, Ramon Magsaysay, Garcia adopted a pro-Asia stance. He supported the establishment of the Association of Southeast Asia (ASA) along with Malaya and Thailand. To expand membership of the association, original members, including the Philippines under Garcia, deliberately deleted provisions from the 1961 Bangkok Declaration that contained Cold War content.

In January 1959, President Garcia recommended the amending of the 1957 Reparations Law (Republic Act No. 1789) by Congress during his State of the Nation Address, which Senator M. Jesús Cuenco, a fellow Nacionalista member, publicly opposed by shouting "Treason! Treason!" immediately after the address.

==== Bohlen–Serrano Agreement ====
During his administration, he acted on the Bohlen–Serrano Agreement, which shortened the lease of the American military bases from 99 years to 25 years and made it renewable after every five years. This favored non-U.S. aligned Asian countries including China. Aside from that, Garcia also forged close relations with Asian U.S. allies like Taiwan, South Korea, and Japan. However, these moves by the Philippines did not sit well with the U.S.

=== Austerity program ===
In the face of the trying conditions in the country, Garcia initiated what has been called "The Austerity Program". His administration was characterized by its austerity program and its insistence on a comprehensive nationalist policy. On March 3, 1960, he affirmed the need for complete economic freedom and added that the government no longer would tolerate the dominance of foreign interests (especially American) in the national economy. He promised to shake off "the yoke of alien domination in business, trade, commerce and industry". Garcia was also credited with his role in reviving Filipino cultural arts. The main points of the Austerity Program were:

1. The government's tightening up of its controls to prevent abuses in the over shipment of exports under license and in under-pricing as well.
2. A more rigid enforcement of the existing regulations on barter shipments.
3. Restriction of government imports to essential items.
4. Reduction of rice imports to minimum.
5. An overhauling of the local transportation system to reduce the importation of gasoline and spare parts.
6. The revision of the tax system to attain more equitable distribution of the payment-burden and achieve more effective collection from those with ability to pay.
7. An intensification of food production.

The program was hailed by the people at large and confidence was expressed that the measures proposed would help solve the standing problems of the Republic.

=== Hydroelectric power development ===
The Garcia administration had ambitious plans to develop the hydroelectric potential of the Philippines. The first in Mindanao which aimed to boost the Maria Cristina Falls from 100,000 to 750,000 kilowatts for an industrial complex in Iligan. The second, on the Angat River in Central Luzon, is near Manila which will provide 230,000 kilowatts to support a new industrial complex, costing 20 million USD. The third project on the Agno River in Northern Luzon which aimed to electrify rural areas, while smaller hydroelectric projects in the Visayan Islands will be funded locally.

We have the natural hydro-electric resources which can be harnessed as a number of them already are, to supply cheap industrial power. The power-harnessing program will be kept up with increasing momentum to realize our desire for rural electrification.

— Carlos P. Garcia, Inaugural Address (December 30, 1957)

=== Creation of the International Rice Research Institute ===
President Garcia, with the strong advocacy of Agriculture and Natural Resources Secretary Juan G. Rodriguez, invited the Ford Foundation and the Rockefeller Foundation "to establish a rice research institute" in Los Baños, Laguna. This led to the establishment of the International Rice Research Institute in 1960.

=== Republic Cultural Award ===
In addition to his laws and programs, the Garcia administration also put emphasis on reviving the Filipino culture. In doing so, the Republic Cultural Award was created. To this day, the award is being given to Filipino artists, scientists, historians, and writers.

=== Opposition ===
The Garcia administration faced opposition from the United States and Magsaysay supporters. Within his own Nacionalista Party, two prominent senators, Senate President Eulogio "Amang" Rodriguez Sr. and Blue Ribbon Committee Chairman M. Jesús Cuenco, were openly critical of Garcia's policies. The United States participated in campaigns against Garcia, accusing his administration of rampant corruption and supporting Grand Alliance senatorial candidates in the 1959 midterm election. Magsaysay supporters, on the other hand, wanted to restore the "spirit of Magsaysay’s honest and energetic administration". Magsaysay supporters were divided into two parties: the Progressive Party and the Liberal Party.

=== 1961 presidential election ===
Towards the end of his first term, he expressed his intention to run for re–election, with him being unanimously nominated as the Nacionalista Party's presidential candidate on June 3, 1961, for the 1961 election. He proclaimed Senator Gil Puyat as his official running mate after two contentious ballots for the vice presidential nomination had extended the Nacionalista convention for three more days but was unable to provide Puyat with a 60% majority vote from delegates. Garcia and Puyat were defeated in the presidential election by Vice President Diosdado Macapagal and Emmanuel Pelaez respectively, both of whom belonged to the rival Liberal Party.

== Post-presidency and death (1961–1971) ==
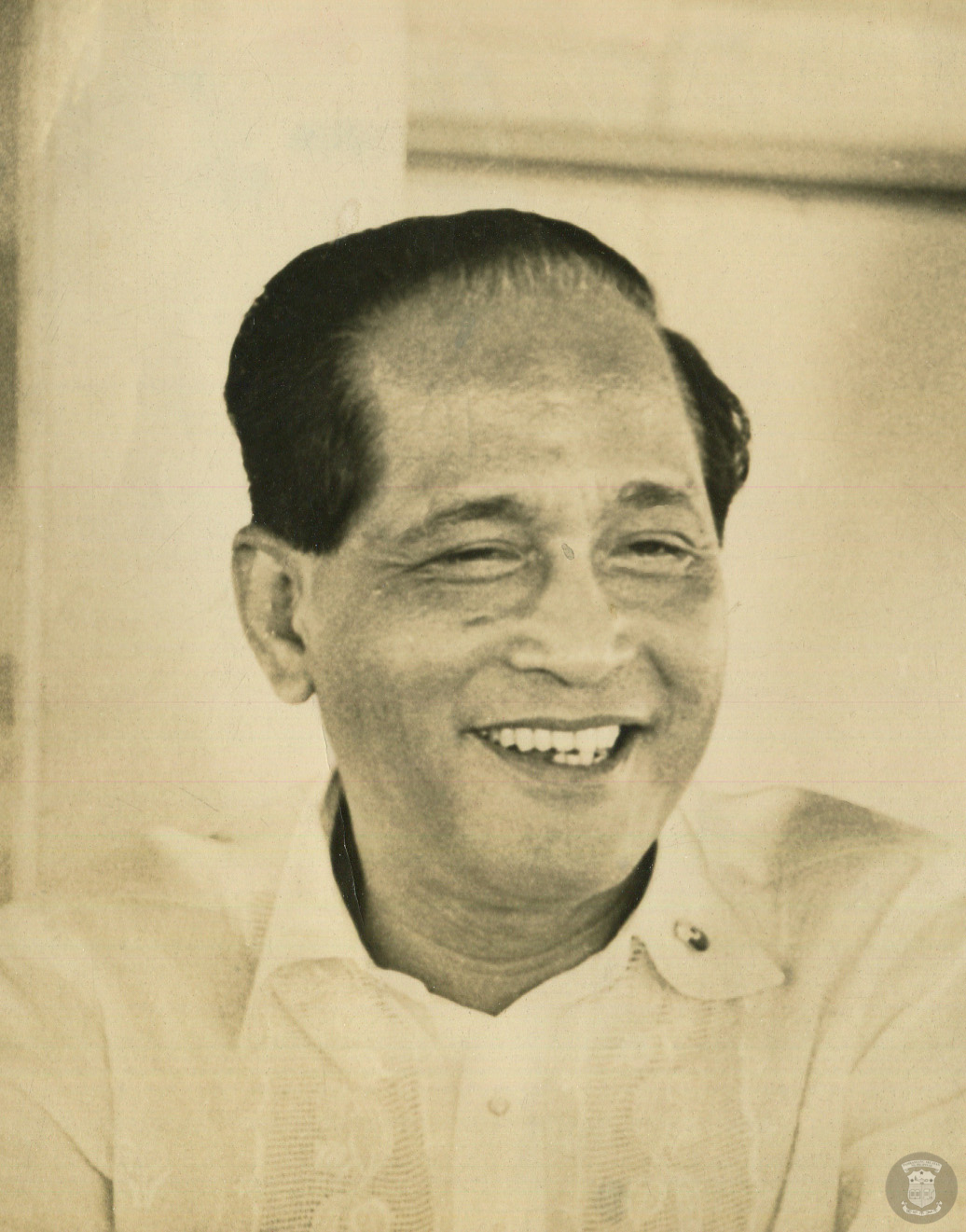
Garcia, circa 1960s

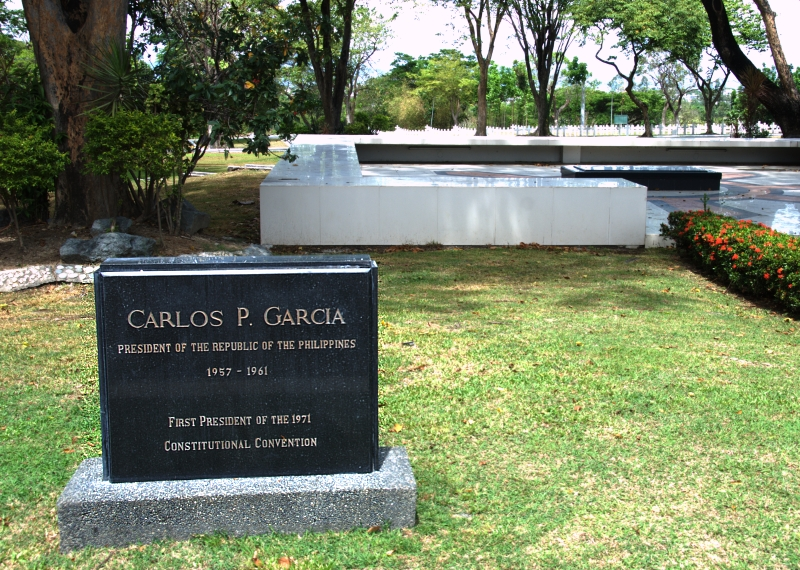
President Garcia's tomb at the Libingan ng mga Bayani

After his failed re-election bid, Garcia retired to Tagbilaran to resume life as a private citizen.

On June 1, 1971, Garcia was elected delegate of the 1971 Constitutional Convention, where delegates elected him as president of the convention. However, on June 14, 1971, Garcia died from a heart attack on 5:57 p.m. at his Manila residence along Bohol Avenue (now Sergeant Esguerra Avenue), Quezon City.

Garcia was the first layman to lie in state in Manila Cathedral—a privilege once reserved for the Archbishops of Manila—and the first president to be buried at the Libingan ng mga Bayani.

== Family ==
On May 24, 1933, he married Leonila Dimataga. The couple had a daughter, Linda Garcia (–1994), who married lawyer Fernando Campos in May 1957.

== Honors ==
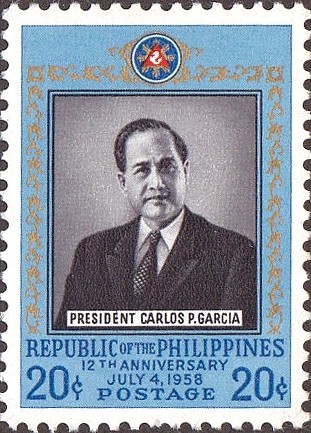
Garcia portrayed in a Philippine 1958 stamp

=== National Honors ===
- Philippines
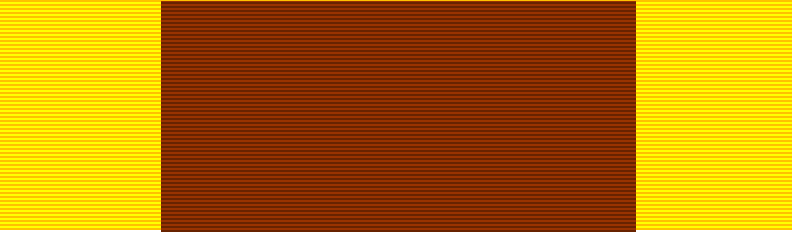
  - Knight of the Order of the Knights of Rizal.

=== Foreign Honors ===
- Malaya:
  - Honorary Recipient of the Order of the Crown of the Realm (D.M.N.(K)) - (1959)
- (Francoist Spain) Spain:
  - Collar of the Order of Civil Merit (October 1, 1957)
- South Vietnam:
  - Exceptional Class of the Order of Kim Khanh - (March 19, 1956)

House of Representatives of the Philippines
Preceded by Teodoro Abueva	Member of the Philippine House of Representatives from Bohol's 3rd district 1925–1931	Succeeded by Filomeno Orbeta Caseñas
Political offices
Preceded by Fernando Lopez	Vice President of the Philippines; 1953–1957	Vacant Title next held by Diosdado Macapagal
Preceded by Joaquin Miguel Elizalde	Secretary of Foreign Affairs; 1953–1957	Succeeded by Felixberto M. Serrano
Preceded by Ramon Magsaysay	President of the Philippines; 1957–1961	Succeeded by Diosdado Macapagal
New office	President of the 1971 Philippine Constitutional Convention; 1971	Succeeded by Diosdado Macapagal
Party political offices
Preceded by Ramon Magsaysay	Nacionalista Party nominee for President of the Philippines; 1957, 1961	Succeeded by Ferdinand Marcos
