= Troadio Galicano =

Filipino Visayan Senator, Congressman, and General in Philippine-American War

The Honourable Troadio Galicano
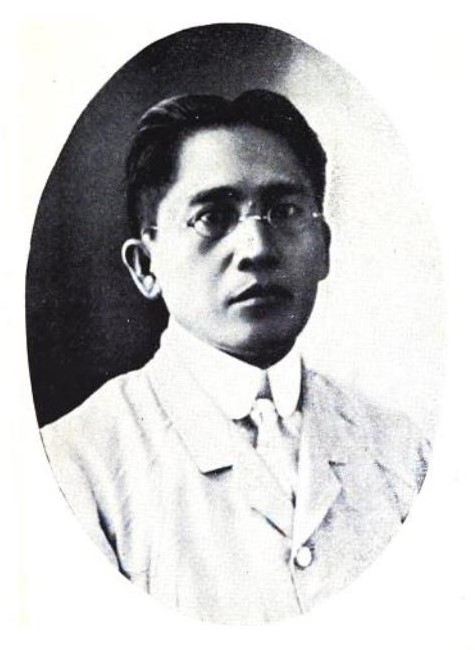
- Galicano as a member of the Philippine Assembly, 1908

Senator of the Philippines from the 11th district
- In office June 2, 1925 – June 2, 1931
- Preceded by: Francisco Soriano
- Succeeded by: Juan Torralba

Member of House of Representatives from Cebu's 5th District
- In office 1907–1912
- Preceded by: Office created
- Succeeded by: Mariano Jesus Cuenco

Personal details
- Born: December 28, 1870 Carcar, Cebu, Captaincy General of the Philippines
- Died: Unknown
- Party: Nacionalista
- Education: Colegio-Seminario de San Carlos
- Profession: Lawyer

Troadio Dayagro Galicano (December 28, 1870) was a Filipino Visayan anti-American guerrilla officer, lawyer, and legislator from Cebu, Philippines. He was promoted to the rank of General during the Philippine-American war, Senator (1925–1931) and the first Member of the House of Representatives of the Cebu's old 5th district (1907–1912).

== Early life ==
Troadio Dayagro Galicano was the son of Guillermo Canondo Galicano and Luzanta Alcoseba Dayagro in Carcar, Cebu and born on December 28, 1870. In preparation for priesthood, he studied at the Colegio-Seminario de San Carlos but his studies were interrupted Philippine-American war broke out. After the war, he resumed his studies and acquired his law degree and became a lawyer on April 9, 1906.

He married Juana Machacon Velez of Carcar, Cebu. His only brother, Jose Galicano, became a Cebuano writer and poet.

== Resistance movement ==
He was promoted to the rank of General and the trusted officer of General Arcadio Maxilom during the outbreak of Philippine Revolution against American colonizers. He established his camp at Sitio Kalangyawon in the mountainous barrio of Napo, Carcar.

On October 26, 1901, he surrendered in Barili to Captain Frank McIntyre of the 19th U.S. Infantry together with six officers and 109 men with 10 rifles after Emilio Aguinaldo laid down his arms.

== Congress ==
On July 30, 1907, he ran under the Nacionalista Party and became the first elected representative of Cebu's old 5th legislative district to the 1st Philippine Legislature. The 5th district was then composed of the towns of Alegria, Badian, Boljoon, Ginatilan, Malabuyoc, Moalboal, Oslob, Samboan, Alcantara, and Santander. He was reelected for a second term in the 2nd Philippine Legislature and served his constituents until 1912.

== Senate ==
In 1925, he was elected Senator representing the 11th senatorial district, comprising the provinces of Misamis Occidental, Surigao, Misamis Oriental, and Bohol to the 7th Philippine Legislature. In his time, the country was divided into 12 senatorial districts, 11 of which elected 2 senators each. He was elected into office together with Jose Clarin, who died in office in 1935.

In 1928, he was again reelected together with Clarin for a second term in the 8th Philippine Legislature and served until 1931.

== Historical commemoration ==
General Troadio Galicano Street in Cebu City was named in his honor by virtue of City Council Resolution No. 641 enacted on October 14, 1968. It starts from B. Rodriguez Street across Nicolas Rafols Street.
