= Filomeno Caseñas =

Filipino politician

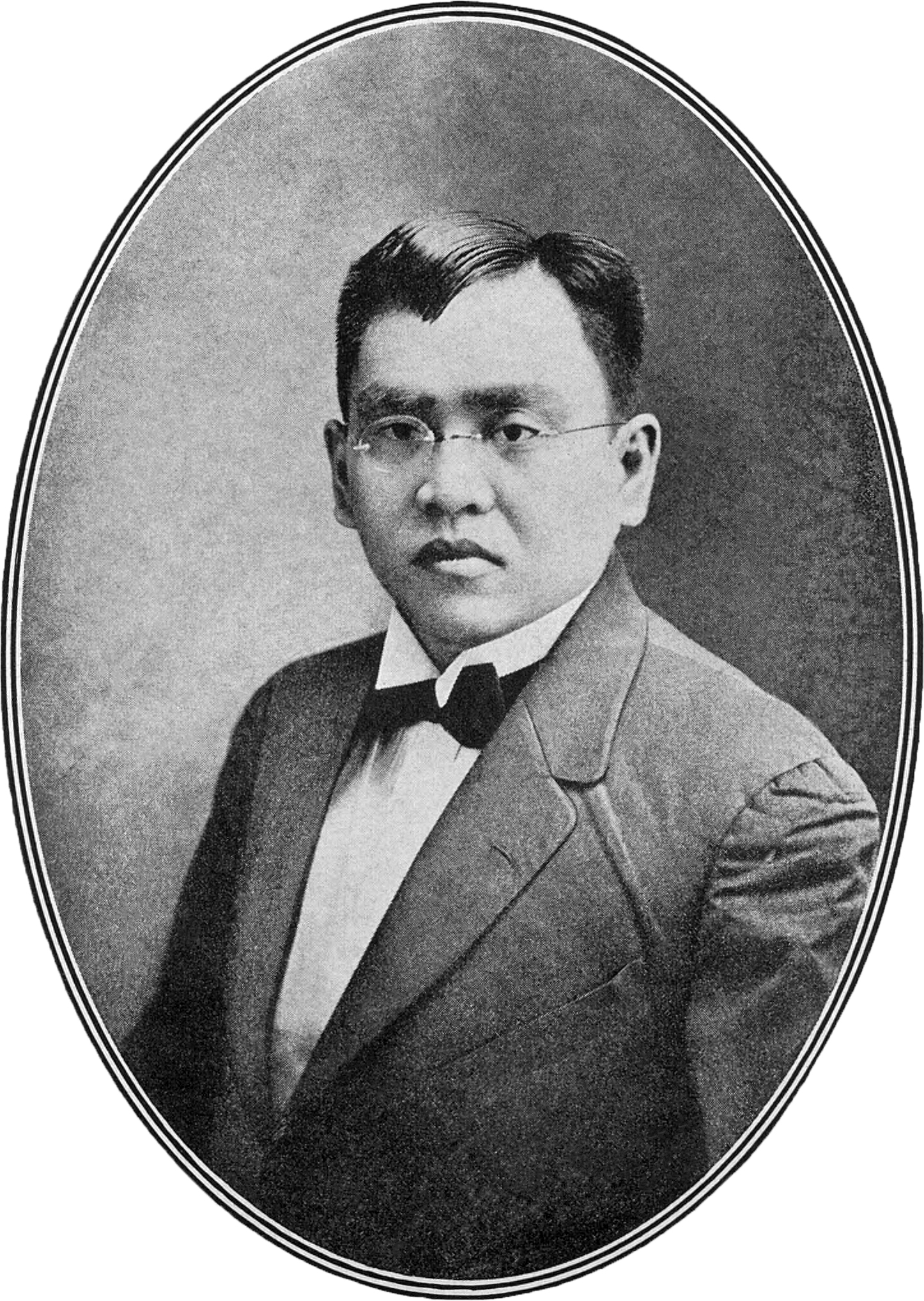
- Caseñas in 1917

Member of the Philippine House of Representatives from Bohol's 3rd district
- In office 1931–1934
- Preceded by: Carlos P. Garcia
- Succeeded by: Margarito E. Revilles
- In office 1916–1922
- Preceded by: Juan Virtudes
- Succeeded by: Teodoro Abueva

8th Governor of Bohol
- In office October 16, 1925 – July 31, 1931
- Preceded by: Juan Sarmiento Torralba
- Succeeded by: Jose Orbeta Caseñas (OIC)

Municipal Vice President of Jagna, Bohol
- In office 1914–1916

Personal details
- Born: April 15, 1888 Jagna, Bohol, Captaincy General of the Philippines
- Died: October 6, 1944 (aged 56) Alicia, Bohol, Captaincy General of the Philippines
- Party: Nacionalista
- Spouse: Micaela Abrea Lloren

Filomeno Orbeta Caseñas (April 15, 1888 – October 6, 1944) was a Boholano politician from Jagna, Bohol. He was a member of the House of Representatives of the Philippines in the 4th, 5th and 9th Legislatures in 1916–1922 and 1931–1934.

== Biography ==
Filomeno Orbeta Caseñas's parents, Catalino Caseñas (November 25, 1864 – March 12, 1925) and Buenaventura Orbeta (July 12, 1866 – February 10, 1926), came from a well-to-do family in Cebu.

Catalino Caseñas was a businessman who taught English to locals. During the Philippine Revolution, his house was burned down by revolutionaries. For safety reasons, the whole family moved to the mountains in barangay Cabungaan. His family returned to the town once the hostilities ceased.

In 1904, Catalino was one of the few literate people in the community, and was appointed as Justice of the Peace in Jagna. However, he kept this position only for two years. He then became involved in local politics, and was elected as the first Mayor of the municipality of Jagna.

He had five siblings: Agustín, Catalina, José, María and Vicenta. Agustin became a governor of undivided Agusan province in 1940, while Jose was once a municipal mayor of Jagna.

=== Early training ===
As a child, Filomeno lived with his uncle, Rev. Fr. Filomeno Orbeta, a disciplinarian who was the parish priest in a neighbouring town, receiving instruction in both religion and basic schooling.

When he was old enough, he went to the Seminario de San Carlos in Cebu City to study for priesthood. The revolution interrupted his studies and he was sent back to his family in Jagna. When the revolution ended, he returned to school to resume his studies.

In college, he joined both the student organization and the debating team, where in an inter-class competition, he won the coveted Gorordo Gold Medal for excellence in oratory. The following year, he teamed up with Jose Briones of Cebu (who was later elected a Representative and Senator) to represent their school in an oratory competition against University of Santo Tomas in Manila. They won a pair of gold medals. He then completed his training as a priest, graduating with the highest honors.

At the time of his graduation, he was still two years younger than the required age for ordination. He decided to take on law, and enrolled at the Colegio de Derecho on Manila, where he obtained his bachelor's degree. During this period Filomeno fell in love with a woman, choosing to leave the priesthood, a decision that upset his parents.
