= 6th Philippine Legislature =

8th legislative term of the Philippines

←	5th	7th	→
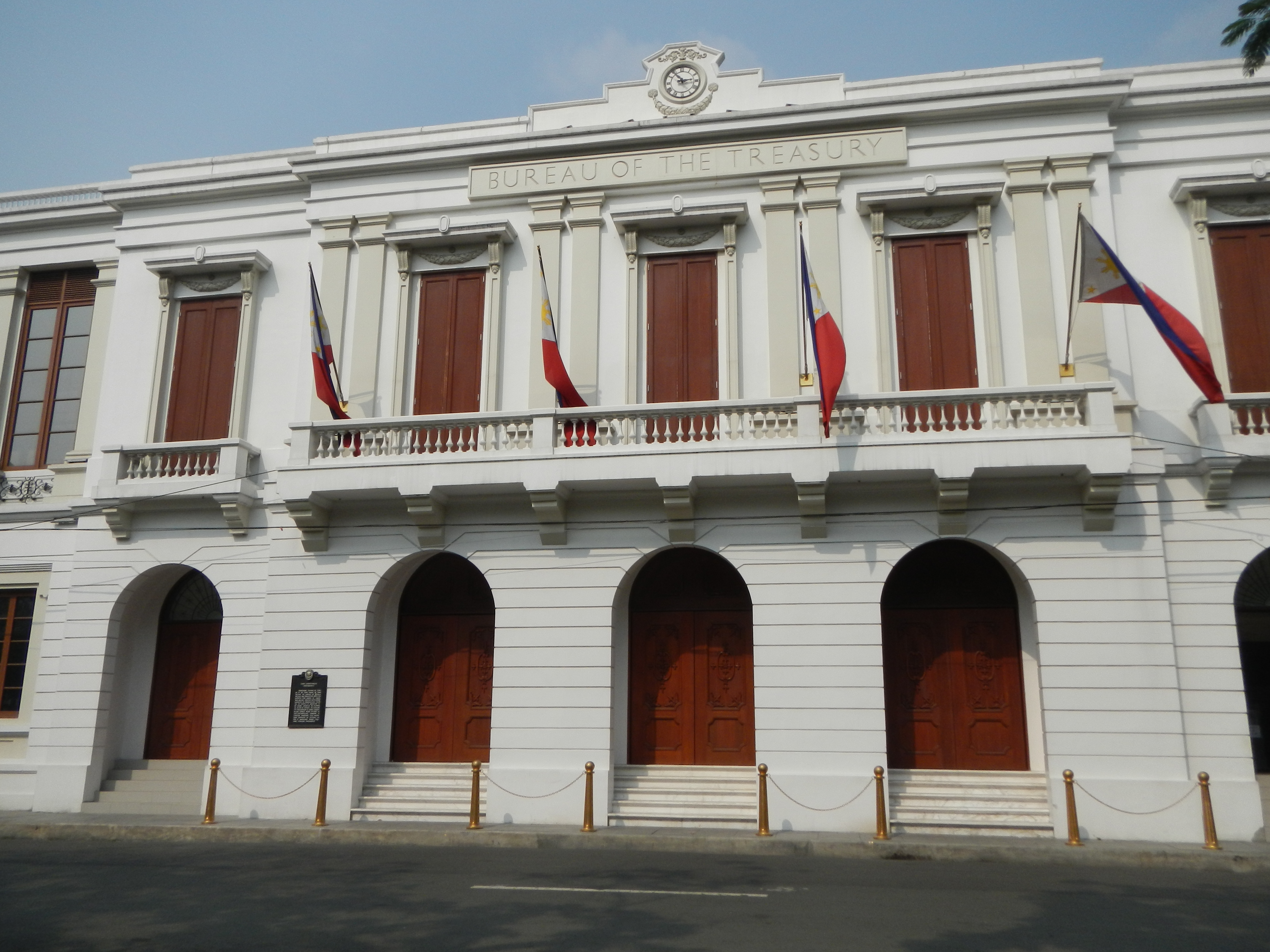
- Ayuntamiento de Manila (2014)

Overview
- Term: October 27, 1922 – February 8, 1925
- Governor-General: Leonard Wood

Senate
- Members: 24
- President: Manuel L. Quezon
- President pro tempore: Sergio Osmeña
- Majority leader: Francisco Enage

House of Representatives
- Members: 93
- Speaker: Manuel Roxas
- Speaker pro tempore: Antonio de las Alas (from November 13, 1923)
- Majority leader: Benigno Aquino Sr.

The 6th Philippine Legislature was the meeting of the legislature of the Philippines under the sovereign control of the United States from 1922 to 1925.

== Sessions ==
- First Regular Session: October 27, 1922 – February 8, 1923
- First Special Session: February 14 – 24, 1923
- Second Regular Session: October 16, 1923 – February 8, 1924
- Third Regular Session: July 16, 1924 – February 8, 1925

== Party summary ==
Senate membership

Beginning of the Legislature

End of the Legislature

=== Senate ===
	Party (shading shows control)					Total	Vacant
	Colectivista	Unipersonalista	Progresista	Democrata	Independent	Total	Vacant
End of previous legislature	—N/a	—N/a	2	1	1	23	1
Begin	10	6	0	7	1	24	0
End	16 (Note: At the end of the Legislature, the Nacionalista Party, previously split into the Colectivista and Unipersonalista factions, reconciled to have a total of 16 seats under one party.)		0	7	1	24	0
Final voting share	66.7%		0%	29.2%	4.2%		
Beginning of next legislature	14		0	10	0	24	0

House membership

Beginning of the Legislature

End of the Legislature

=== House of Representatives ===
	Party (shading shows control)					Total	Vacant
	Colectivista	Unipersonalista	Progresista	Democrata	Independent	Total	Vacant
End of previous legislature	—N/a	—N/a	1	5	6	91	0
Begin	31	27	0	29	6	93	0
End	58 (Note: At the end of the Legislature, the Nacionalista Party, previously split into the Colectivista and Unipersonalista factions, reconciled to have a total of 58 seats under one party.)		0	29	6	93	0
Final voting share	62.4%		—N/a	31.2%	6.5%		
Beginning of next legislature	64		0	21	7	92	0

== Leadership ==
=== Senate ===
Senate President

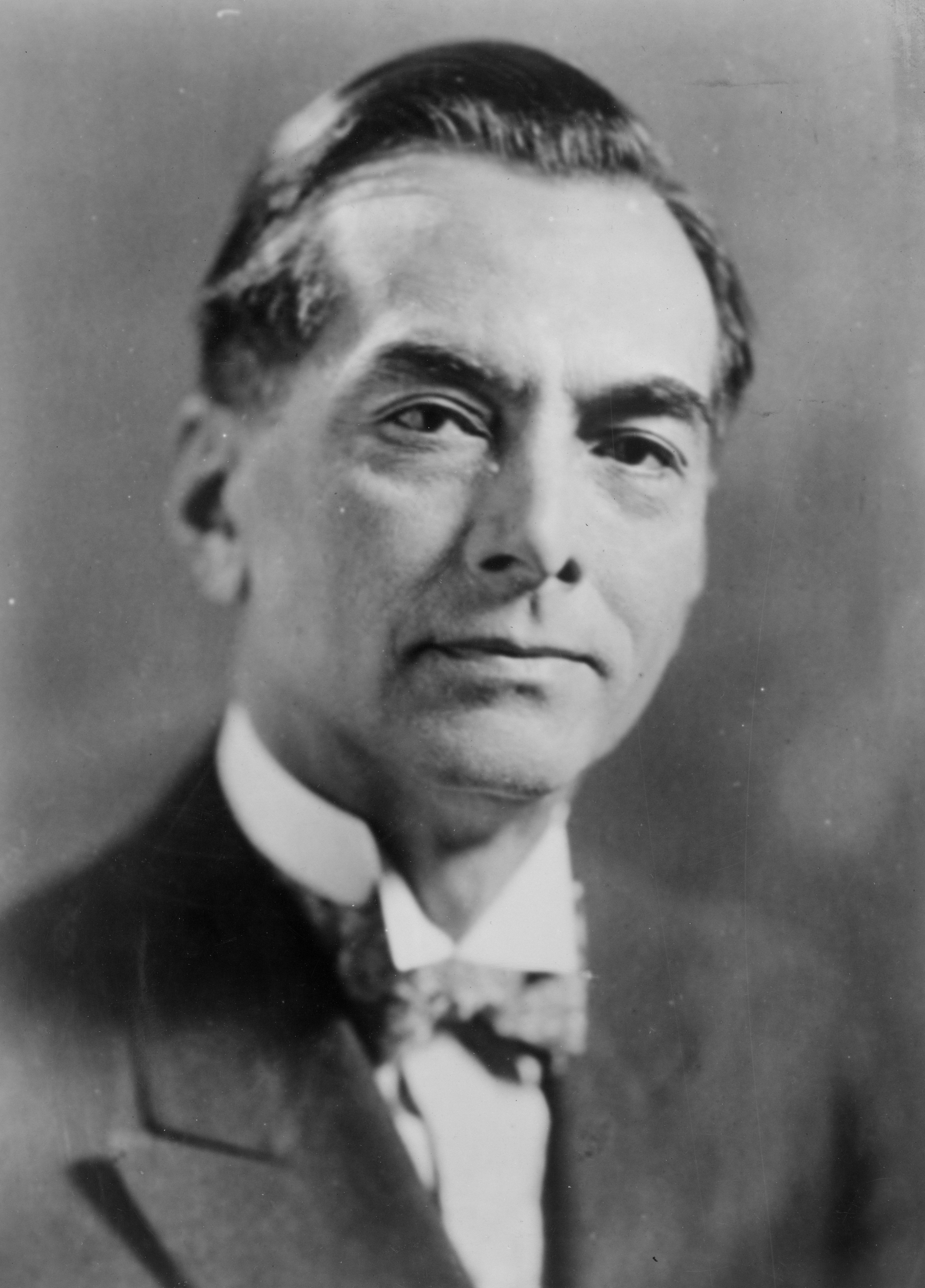
Manuel L. Quezon

- President: Manuel L. Quezon (5th District, Nacionalista Colectivista)
- President pro tempore: Sergio Osmeña (10th District, Nacionalista Unipersonalista)
- Majority Floor Leader: Francisco Enage (9th District, Nacionalista Colectivista)

=== House of Representatives ===
House Speaker

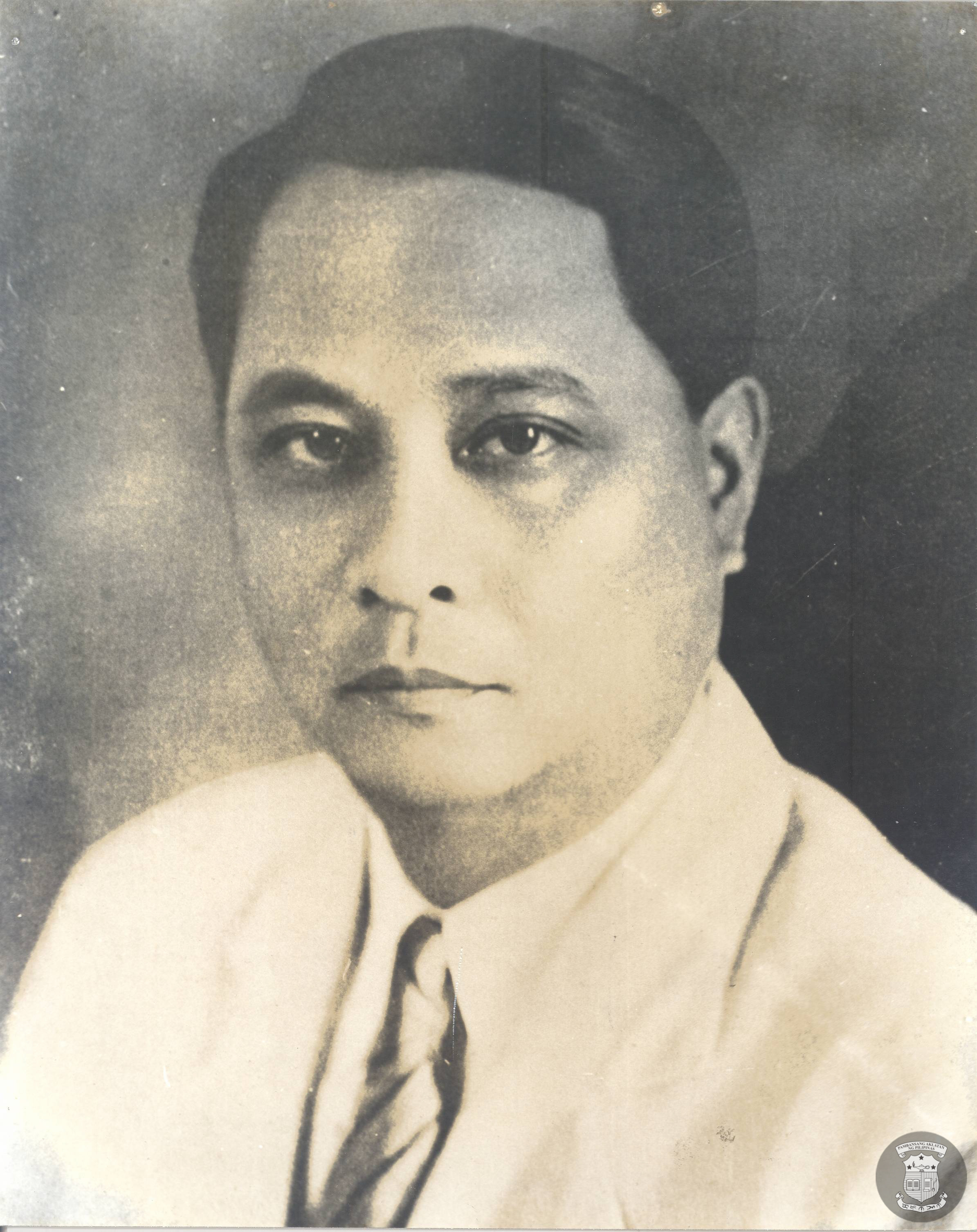
Manuel Roxas

- Speaker: Manuel Roxas (Capiz–1st, Nacionalista Colectivista)
- Speaker pro tempore: Antonio de las Alas (Batangas–1st, Nacionalista Colectivista), from November 13, 1923
- Majority Floor Leader: Benigno Aquino Sr. (Tarlac–2nd, Nacionalista Unipersonalista)

== Members ==
=== Senate ===
The following are the terms of the elected senators of this Legislature, according to the date of election:

- For senators elected on June 3, 1919: June 3, 1919 – June 2, 1925
- For senators elected on June 6, 1922: June 6, 1922 – June 5, 1928

Senators of the 12th District were appointed for indefinite terms.

District	Term end	Senator	Party (Note: Party affiliation at election.)
1st District	1925	Santiago Fonacier	Nacionalista Colectivista
1st District	1928	Isabelo de los Reyes	Democrata
2nd District	1925	Bernabe de Guzman	Nacionalista Unipersonalista
2nd District	1928	Alejo Mabanag	Nacionalista Unipersonalista
3rd District	1925	Teodoro Sandiko	Democrata
3rd District	1928	Santiago Lucero	Democrata
4th District	1925	Pedro Guevara (Note: Pedro Guevara was elected as Resident Commissioner of the Philippines on March 4, 1923.)	Nacionalista Colectivista
4th District	1925	Ramon J. Fernandez (Note: Ramon J. Fernandez was elected on October 3, 1923, to succeed Pedro Guevara.)	Nacionalista Colectivista
4th District	1928	Emiliano Tria Tirona	Democrata
5th District	1925	Antero Soriano	Nacionalista Colectivista
5th District	1928	Manuel L. Quezon	Nacionalista Colectivista
6th District	1925	Vicente de Vera	Nacionalista Colectivista
6th District	1928	Juan B. Alegre	Nacionalista Colectivista
7th District	1925	Jose Maria Arroyo	Nacionalista Colectivista
7th District	1928	Jose Hontiveros	Democrata
8th District	1925	Hermenegildo Villanueva	Nacionalista Colectivista
8th District	1928	Espiridion Guanco (Note: Espiridion Guanco died on May 2, 1925.)	Nacionalista Colectivista
9th District	1925	Francisco Enage	Nacionalista Colectivista
9th District	1928	Tomas Gomez	Independent
10th District	1925	Celestino Rodriguez	Nacionalista Unipersonalista
10th District	1928	Sergio Osmeña	Nacionalista Unipersonalista
11th District	1925	Francisco Soriano	Nacionalista Unipersonalista
11th District	1928	Jose Clarin	Nacionalista Unipersonalista
12th District	—	Hadji Butu (Note: Appointed.)	Democrata
12th District	—	Teofisto Guingona Sr. (Note: Teofisto Guingona Sr. was an appointed senator who resigned on November 13, 1923.)	Democrata
12th District	—	Jose Alejandrino (Note: Jose Alejandrino was appointed on November 13, 1923, to succeed Teofisto Guingona Sr.)	Democrata

=== House of Representatives ===
Province/City	District	Representative	Party
Abra	Lone	Adolfo Brillantes	Nacionalista Colectivista
Albay	1st	Agapito Buenconsejo	Nacionalista Unipersonalista
Albay	2nd	Pedro Martinez Jimeno	Nacionalista Unipersonalista
Albay	3rd	Pedro Sabido	Nacionalista Unipersonalista
Antique	Lone	Angel Salazar	Nacionalista Colectivista
Bataan	Lone	Antonio G. Llamas	Democrata
Batanes	Lone	Claudio Castillejos	Nacionalista Unipersonalista
Batangas	1st	Antonio de las Alas	Nacionalista Colectivista
Batangas	2nd	Rafael Villanueva	Nacionalista Unipersonalista
Batangas	3rd	Claro M. Recto	Democrata
Bohol	1st	Fermin Torralba	Nacionalista Unipersonalista
Bohol	2nd	Cornelio G. Sarigumba	Democrata
Bohol	3rd	Teodoro Abueva	Democrata
Bulacan	1st	Jose Padilla Sr.	Democrata
Bulacan	2nd	Norberto C. Manikis	Democrata
Cagayan	1st	Alfonso Ponce Enrile	Democrata
Cagayan	2nd	Proceso Sebastian	Democrata
Camarines Norte	Lone	Jose D. Zeñarosa	Nacionalista Colectivista
Camarines Sur	1st	Ramon B. Felipe	Nacionalista Colectivista
Camarines Sur	2nd	Sulpicio V. Cea	Nacionalista Unipersonalista
Capiz	1st	Manuel Roxas	Nacionalista Colectivista
Capiz	2nd	Agustin Aldea	Democrata
Capiz	3rd	Manuel Terencio	Nacionalista Unipersonalista
Cavite	Lone	Pedro F. Espiritu	Democrata
Cebu	1st	Manuel Briones	Nacionalista Unipersonalista
Cebu	2nd	Vicente Sotto	Democrata
Cebu	3rd	Vicente Rama	Democrata
Cebu	4th	Isidoro Aldanese	Nacionalista Unipersonalista
Cebu	5th	Mariano Jesus Cuenco	Nacionalista Unipersonalista
Cebu	6th	Nicolas Rafols	Democrata
Cebu	7th	Jose Alonso	Nacionalista Unipersonalista
Ilocos Norte	1st	Ireneo Ranjo	Nacionalista Colectivista
Ilocos Norte	2nd	Ramon Campos	Nacionalista Colectivista
Ilocos Sur	1st	Vicente Singson Pablo	Democrata
Ilocos Sur	2nd	Lupo Biteng	Nacionalista Unipersonalista
Iloilo	1st	Jose Evangelista	Nacionalista Unipersonalista
Iloilo	2nd	Cresenciano Lozano	Nacionalista Unipersonalista
Iloilo	3rd	Tomas Confesor	Nacionalista Colectivista
Iloilo	4th	Federico R. Tirador	Democrata
Iloilo	5th	Tomas Vargas	Democrata
Isabela	Lone	Tolentino Verzosa	Nacionalista Unipersonalista
La Union	1st	Pio Ancheta	Nacionalista Colectivista
La Union	2nd	Mauro Ortiz	Nacionalista Colectivista
Laguna	1st	Tomas Dizon	Nacionalista Colectivista
Laguna	2nd	Aurelio Palileo	Nacionalista Colectivista
Leyte	1st	Carlos Tan	Nacionalista Colectivista
Leyte	2nd	Tomas Oppus	Nacionalista Colectivista
Leyte	3rd	Jose Maria Veloso	Democrata
Leyte	4th	Filomeno Montejo	Nacionalista Colectivista
Manila	1st	Gregorio Perfecto	Democrata
Manila	2nd	Alfonso E. Mendoza	Democrata
Marinduque	Lone	Ricardo Nepomuceno	Nacionalista Unipersonalista
Masbate	Lone	Pablo de la Rosa	Nacionalista Unipersonalista
Mindanao and Sulu	Lone	Rafael Acuña	Nacionalista Colectivista
Mindanao and Sulu	Lone	Pablo Lorenzo	Nacionalista Unipersonalista
Mindanao and Sulu	Lone	Teodoro Palma Gil	Nacionalista Unipersonalista
Mindanao and Sulu	Lone	Ugalingan Piang	Nacionalista Unipersonalista
Mindanao and Sulu	Lone	Datu Tampugaw	Independent
Mindoro	Lone	Juan L. Luna	Nacionalista Colectivista
Misamis	1st	Jose Artadi	Nacionalista Unipersonalista
Misamis	2nd	Anselmo Bernad	Independent
Mountain Province	Lone	Joaquin Codamon	Independent
Mountain Province	Lone	Miguel Cornejo	Independent
Mountain Province	Lone	Henry A. Kamora	Independent
Negros Occidental	1st	Serafin P. Hilado	Nacionalista Unipersonalista
Negros Occidental	2nd	Vicente Jimenez Yanson	Nacionalista Colectivista
Negros Occidental	3rd	Elisio M. Limsiaco	Nacionalista Colectivista
Negros Oriental	1st	Guillermo Z. Villanueva	Nacionalista Colectivista
Negros Oriental	2nd	Fermin Martinez	Nacionalista Colectivista
Nueva Ecija	Lone	Hermogenes Concepcion	Democrata
Nueva Vizcaya	Lone	Evaristo Pañganiban (Note: Evaristo Pañganiban was appointed as representative, but later resigned on June 12, 1924.)	Nacionalista Unipersonalista
Nueva Vizcaya	Lone	Eulogio Rodriguez (Note: Eulogio Rodriguez was appointed on June 12, 1924, to succeed Evaristo Pañganiban.)	Democrata
Palawan	Lone	Patricio Fernandez	Nacionalista Colectivista
Pampanga	1st	Pedro Valdez Liongson	Nacionalista Unipersonalista
Pampanga	2nd	Vicente Manapat	Democrata
Pangasinan	1st	Mauro Navarro	Nacionalista Unipersonalista
Pangasinan	2nd	Lamberto Siguion Reyna	Nacionalista Colectivista
Pangasinan	3rd	Raymundo O. Camacho	Nacionalista Unipersonalista
Pangasinan	4th	Eusebio V. Sison	Nacionalista Colectivista
Pangasinan	5th	Ricardo Gonzales	Nacionalista Unipersonalista
Rizal	1st	Andres Pascual	Democrata
Rizal	2nd	Mariano Melendres	Democrata
Romblon	Lone	Leonardo Festin	Nacionalista Unipersonalista
Samar	1st	Jose Avelino	Democrata
Samar	2nd	Pascual B. Azanza	Democrata
Samar	3rd	Iñigo Abenis	Nacionalista Unipersonalista
Sorsogon	1st	Antonio Rocha	Democrata
Sorsogon	2nd	Federico D. Jimenez	Democrata
Surigao	Lone	Clemente V. Diez	Nacionalista Unipersonalista
Tarlac	1st	Gregorio M. Bañaga	Democrata
Tarlac	2nd	Benigno Aquino Sr.	Nacionalista Unipersonalista
Tayabas	1st	Agustin S. Alvarez	Nacionalista Colectivista
Tayabas	2nd	Rafael R. Vilar	Nacionalista Colectivista
Zambales	Lone	Alejo Labrador	Independent

== Changes in membership ==
=== Senate ===
District	Incumbent				Special election	Successor		
District	Senator	Party	Date	Reason	Special election	Senator	Party	Date
4th District	Pedro Guevara	Nacionalista Colectivista	March 4, 1923	Elected Resident Commissioner of the Philippines	October 3, 1923	Ramon J. Fernandez	Nacionalista Colectivista	October 3, 1923
12th District	Teofisto Guingona Sr.	Democrata	November 13, 1923	Resigned	—N/a	Jose Alejandrino	Democrata	November 13, 1923
8th District	Espiridion Guanco	Nacionalista Colectivista	May 2, 1925	Died in office	—N/a			

=== House of Representatives ===
District	Incumbent				Special election	Successor		
District	Member	Party	Date	Reason	Special election	Member	Party	Date
Nueva Vizcaya–Lone	Evaristo Pañganiban	Nacionalista Unipersonalista	June 12, 1924	Resigned	—N/a	Eulogio Rodriguez	Democrata	June 12, 1924

== See also ==
- 1922 Philippine legislative election
  - 1922 Philippine Senate elections
  - 1922 Philippine House of Representatives elections
