= 1922 Philippine Senate elections =

3rd Philippine senatorial election

- June 6, 1922

11 of the 24 seats in the Philippine Senate
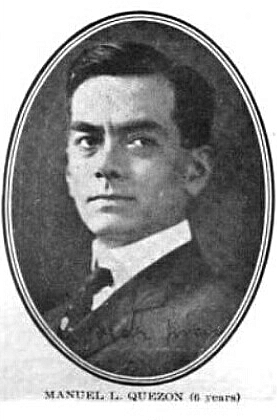

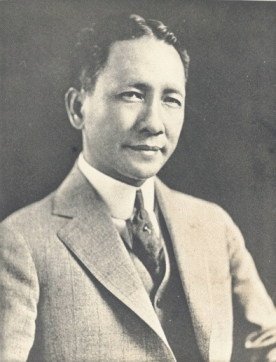
	Majority party	Minority party
Leader	Manuel L. Quezon	Sergio Osmeña
Party	Nacionalista–Colectivista	Nacionalista–Unipersonalista
Leader's seat	5th District	10th District
Seats won	5	3
Seats after	12	6
- Election results; each district sent in two seats to the Senate. 2 Colectivistas 2 Unipersonalistas 1 Colectivista and 1 Democrata 1 Colectivista and 1 independent
Senate President before election
Manuel L. Quezon
Nacionalista–Colectivista
Elected Senate President
Manuel L. Quezon
Nacionalista–Colectivista

Senatorial elections were held on June 6, 1922, in the Philippines under the Jones Law provisions. It was controversial when Senate President Manuel L. Quezon accused Sergio Osmeña of autocratic leadership and for his failure in handling the economic crisis which began in 1919. This resulted to the Nacionalista Party to be split.

== Quezon-Osmeña spilt ==
In 1921, the economic crisis that began in 1919 began to worsen in the Philippine Islands. From 1919 to 1921, there were floods in parts of the country resulting in a rice crisis. The Philippine National Bank lost ₱38,000,000 (equivalent to ₱11,587,999,091 in 2021) due to mismanagement and the government deficit was more than ₱7,000,000 (equivalent to ₱2,134,631,411 in 2021), which led to the raising of taxes. During this period, all government-owned corporations suffered losses. The economic crisis led to massive discontent and criticism to the standing party, the Nacionalista Party.

When U.S. President Warren G. Harding sent the Wood-Forbes Mission for the Philippine Islands in April 1921, Quezon became worried of Osmeña's autocratic party leadership. The mission's aim was to investigate the economic and political situation in the islands. For Quezon, Osmeña's leadership would harm the Nacionalista Party due to the financial mess of the Philippine National Bank.

After the Wood-Forbes report was published, Quezon publicly campaigned against Osmeña. He stated that ever since the establishment of the Philippine government under the Jones Act, the Legislature and the Cabinet put Osmeña direct control of the Philippines' legislation and administration of public affairs. Appointments made by department secretaries to the Governor-General were "made upon Osmeña's initiative" or with his consent. He also blamed him for the Philippine National Bank's financial mess. In response to the leadership issue, in December 1921, Osmeña resigned for the speakership. That same month, representatives approved a resolution expressing confidence to Osmeña's leadership in government, the senate did not take action.

The Council of Ten was then created to conciliate the two. Since most of its members were pro-Osmeña lawmakers, Quezon resigned as Senate President in January 1922. Osmeña reacted to this by begging him to withdraw his resignation. The debate between Osmeña and Quezon continued until February 1922. Due to the severity of the leadership crisis, Osmeña also resigned as Nacionalista Party leader with reluctance from its members. On February 17, 1922, Quezon formed the Partido Nacionalista Colectivista in Manila.

== Electoral system ==
In a staggered election, the seats of the senators who were first place in 1916 were up for election. The Philippines is divided into 12 senatorial districts, of which all districts save for the 12th district, has one of its seats up. In the 12th district, any vacancy is filled via appointment of the Governor-General. The election itself is via first-past-the-post.

== Results ==
↓

12	6	6
Colectivista	Democrata	Unipersonalista

=== Philippines's 1st senatorial district ===
Candidate	Party	Votes	%
Isabelo de los Reyes	Partido Democrata Nacional	18,901	31.13
Elpidio Quirino	Partido Unipersonalista	13,752	22.65
Julio Borbon	Partido Unipersonalista	9,544	15.72
Iñigo Bitanga	Partido Unipersonalista	7,115	11.72
Vicente T. Fernandez	Partido Unipersonalista	6,856	11.29
Maximino Mina	Partido Unipersonalista	4,553	7.50
Total		60,721	100.00

=== Philippines's 2nd senatorial district ===
Candidate	Party	Votes	%
Alejo Mabanag	Partido Unipersonalista	17,006	70.21
Pedro Maria Sison	Partido Colectivista	7,214	29.79
Total		24,220	100.00
Total votes		24,220	–

=== Philippines's 3rd senatorial district ===
Candidate	Party	Votes	%
Santiago Lucero	Partido Democrata Nacional	46,297	55.75
Felipe Buencamino Jr.	Partido Colectivista	36,752	44.25
Total		83,049	100.00
Total votes		83,049	–

=== Philippines's 4th senatorial district ===
Candidate	Party	Votes	%
Emiliano Tria Tirona	Partido Democrata Nacional	49,780	58.89
Ramon Diokno	Partido Colectivista	34,752	41.11
Total		84,532	100.00
Total votes		84,532	–

=== Philippines's 5th senatorial district ===
Candidate	Party	Votes	%
Manuel L. Quezon	Partido Colectivista	34,157	100.00
Total		34,157	100.00
Total votes		34,157	–

=== Philippines's 6th senatorial district ===
Candidate	Party	Votes	%
Juan B. Alegre	Partido Colectivista	24,190	51.21
José Fuentebella	Partido Unipersonalista	23,045	48.79
Total		47,235	100.00
Total votes		47,235	–

=== Philippines's 7th senatorial district ===
Candidate	Party	Votes	%
Jose Hontiveros	Partido Democrata Nacional	16,035	61.03
Jose Altavas	Partido Unipersonalista	10,240	38.97
Total		26,275	100.00
Total votes		26,275	–

=== Philippines's 8th senatorial district ===
Candidate	Party	Votes	%
Espiridion Guanco	Partido Colectivista	21,535	56.66
Matias Hilado	Partido Unipersonalista	16,472	43.34
Total		38,007	100.00
Total votes		38,007	–

=== Philippines's 9th senatorial district ===
Candidate	Party	Votes	%
Tomas Gomez	Independent	7,923	60.81
Esteban Singson	Partido Unipersonalista	3,565	27.36
Pastor Navarro	Partido Democrata Nacional	1,541	11.83
Total		13,029	100.00

=== Philippines's 10th senatorial district ===
Candidate	Party	Votes	%
Sergio Osmeña	Partido Unipersonalista	24,218	65.80
Pantaleon del Rosario	Partido Colectivista	12,586	34.20
Total		36,804	100.00
Total votes		36,804	–

=== Philippines's 11th senatorial district ===
Candidate	Party	Votes	%
Jose Clarin	Partido Unipersonalista	9,345	69.68
Troadio Galicano	Partido Democrata Nacional	4,066	30.32
Total		13,411	100.00
Total votes		13,411	–

=== Philippines's 12th senatorial district* ===
Candidate	Party
Teofisto Guingona Sr.	Partido Democrata Nacional
Hadji Butu	Partido Democrata Nacional
Total

- Non-elective positions. Appointed by the American Governor-General

=== October 3, 1923 Special Election for Philippines's 4th senatorial district ===
To serve the unexpired term of Senator Pedro Guevara, who resigned on March 4, 1923. The winner will serve until 1925.

Candidate	Party	Votes	%
Ramon J. Fernandez	Partido Nacionalista	54,869	58.12
Juan Sumulong	Partido Democrata Nacional	39,533	41.88
Total		94,402	100.00

Party	Seats				
Party	Up	Before	Won	After	+/−
Nacionalista (Note: The Nacionalista Party won 8 seats: 5 seats under the Colectivistas and 3 seats under the Unipersonalistas. Following the election, the Nacionalista Party has a total of 18 seats: 12 seats under the Colectivistas and 6 seats under the Unipersonalistas.)	10	20	8	18	−2
Democrata	0	1	3	4	+3
Progresista	1	1	0	0	−1
Appointed (Note: At the time of the election, the two appointed senators were from Democrata.)	0	2	0	2	0
Total	11	24	11	24	0

== See also ==
- 6th Philippine Legislature
- Commission on Elections
- Politics of the Philippines
- Philippine elections
