= Jose Salvador Alejandrino Natividad =

Spanish military leader (1873–1954)

General Jose Salvador Alejandrino Natividad
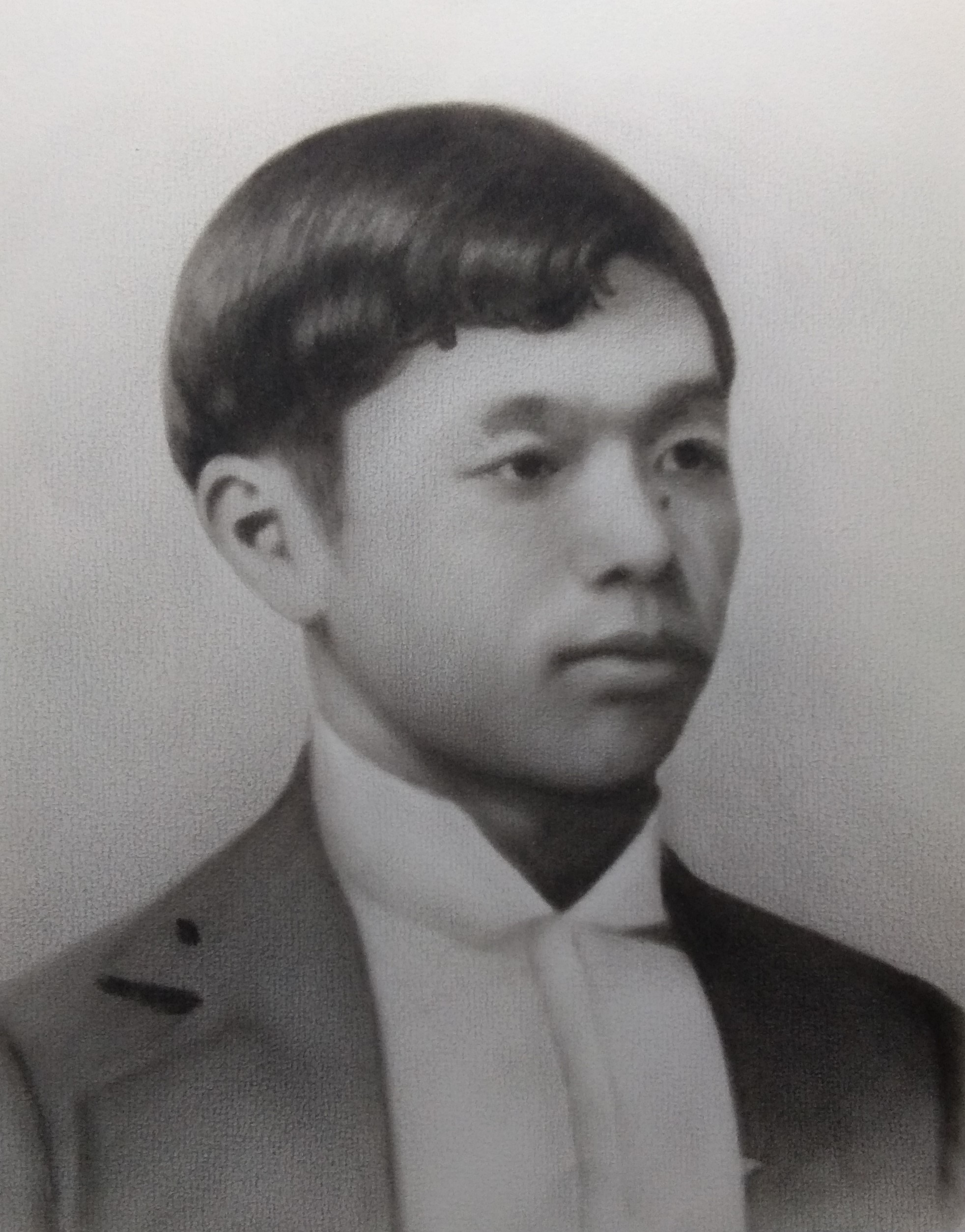
- Born: September 20, 1873; Arayat, Pampanga Province, Central Luzon, Philippines
- Died: May 12, 1954 (aged 80); Davao City, Davao del Sur Province, Davao, Philippines
- Burial place: Davao City, Davao del Sur Province, Davao, Philippines
- Spouse(s): Delfina Herbosa (m. 1898; died 1900) Herminia Alcantara Garchitorena
- Children: Paz Herbosa Natividad (1898-1900); Aurora Garchitorena Natividad; Gloria Garchitorena Natividad; Soledad Garchitorena Natividad; Jose Salvador Garchitorena Natividad Jr.; Josefina Garchitorena Natividad
- Relatives: Gen. Mamerto Natividad Jr. (brother); Gen. Benito Natividad (brother); Jose Rizal (uncle by marriage)
- Military career
- Allegiance: Republic of Biak-na-Bato; Katipunan (Magdalo); First Philippine Republic
- Branch: Philippine Revolutionary Army
- Rank: General
- Conflicts: Philippine Revolution

General Jose Salvador Alejandrino Natividad (September 20, 1873 – May 12, 1954) was a military leader during the Philippine Revolution against Spain. His mother was Gervasia Alejandrino and his father was Mamerto Santos Natividad, Sr., who became the First Martyr of Nueva Ecija after he was arrested for sedition, tortured, and executed on September 26, 1896. Gen. Jose Salvador was the second eldest of twelve children. Among his siblings were brothers General Mamerto Natividad Jr., Benito Natividad, Joaquin Natividad, Francisco Natividad, and Pedro Natividad.

== Philippine Revolution ==
Together with five (5) of his brothers, Jose Salvador joined the Katipunan to avenge their father's death. They traveled from Nueva Ecija to Binakayan, Cavite, where they were the house guests of Baldomero Aguinaldo. The Spaniards retaliated by burning their mansion in Jaen and their sugar mills.

With his brothers, he fought under General Emilio Aguinaldo in battles against the Spanish Army and was appointed Brigadier General.

In November 1897, Gen. Jose Salvador was one of those, together with Paciano Rizal and Severino de las Alas, who opposed the Constitution drafted by Isabelo Artacho and Felix Ferrer. The said Constitution was very similar to that of the Cuban Revolutionists. Nevertheless, the Constitution was approved by the Biak-Na-Bato General Assembly under President Emilio Aguinaldo.

== Pact of Biak-Na-Bato ==
When Pedro Paterno was traveling to negotiate with Emilio Aguinaldo, he requested an officer of General Paciano Rizal's army to accompany and give him safe passage to the Biak-Na-Bato Philippine Revolutionary Army Headquarters to present the Spanish Government claims. It was then Major General Jose Salvador was assigned to escort Pedro Paterno to Biak-Na-Bato by Gen. Paciano Rizal.

Emilio Aguinaldo later appointed Gen. Jose Salvador, together with Pedro Paterno, to negotiate the historic truce for the Filipinos with the Spanish colonial government. However, the Spanish Governor General Primo de Rivera, rejected Jose Salvador and preferred Paterno because of his willingness to compromise. Gen. Jose Salvador was later prevented from signing the Pact of Biak-Na-Bato when it was concluded on December 14, 1897.

The provisions of the Pact of Biak-Na-Bato entailed, among others, the exile of Philippine Revolutionary Officers to Hong Kong, payments to the Philippine Revolutionaries, Spanish Army Officers as hostages to ensure safe arrival to Hong Kong and surrender of rebel arms. Jose Salvador's brothers Benito and Joaquin were part of the group of officers exiled to Hong Kong. However, Salvador, together with Baldomero Aguinaldo, Artemio Ricarte, Isabelo Artacho and other officers, were given the local assignments.

Two days before embarking on his exile, Emilio Aguinaldo issued a decree delegating the powers of government to members of the Cabinet who were to stay behind. Jose Salvador was given the task to aid Baldomero Aguinaldo and Isabelo Artacho in the distribution of cash gratuities and passes to go home to the soldiers of the Biak-Na-Bato detachment.

For the release of insurgent arms, General Artemio Ricarte appointed commissioners, giving each their respective credentials. Generals Jose Salvador and Paciano Rizal were assigned the Province of Laguna. Together with his companions, General Jose Salvador was also tasked with receiving in Biak-Na-Bato the hostage Spanish Generals Monet and Fernandez Tejeiro with their aids, Colonel Torrontegui and Captain La Torre and keeping them under their watch as part of the provisions in the Pact.

Upon receipt of a telegram from Aguinaldo on December 28 or 29, 1897 announcing their safe arrival in Hong Kong and receipt of the first payment in the amount of $MXN400,000 from the Spanish government, Gen. Jose Salvador and other Philippine Revolutionary Army Officers agreed to immediately release the Spanish Army hostages. The insurgent arms were released the following day at 8 a.m. Shortly after, a petition signed by Artemio Ricarte, Isabelo Artacho and Jose Salvador was sent to the Spanish Governor General Primo De Rivera to release the sum of $MXN100,000 for guns surrendered in accordance with the agreement.

Gen. Jose Salvador then joined Aguinaldo in exile in Hong Kong as part of the Pact of Biak-Na-Bato.

== Philippine-American War ==
Gen. Jose Salvador joined the Partido Federalista or Federal Party. This political party was formed on December 23, 1900. It advocated for Philippine statehood within the United States.

Toward the end of the war, he served as an emissary. He is reported to have met with Generals Manuel Tinio, Jose Alejandrino and Vicente Salazar on April 3, 1901, informing them that President Emilio Aguinaldo had been captured. According to Jose Salvador, the three (3) Generals agreed to surrender but Tinio changed his mind. Gen. Jose Salvador is also reported to have delivered a letter from Gen. Manuel Tinio to Gen. James Franklin Bell on April 9, 1901, requesting safe conduct to Manila to meet with General MacArthur. This request was refused by Gen. Bell.

== Marriage and Children ==
His first wife was Delfina R. Herbosa (December 20, 1879 – March 10, 1900), was the niece of Dr. Jose Rizal. He met Delfina in the Katipunan, and they married on February 9, 1898, when she was 19 years of age. They were together in various battles against the Spaniards. Delfina was known for being one of the three Filipina women who sewed the Philippine Flag commissioned by Emilio Aguinaldo while he was exiled in Hong Kong. Salvador and Delfina had a daughter named Paz. Unfortunately, their daughter died tragically less than two (2) years of age when an alcohol lamp accidentally fell on her, this caused Delfina much sorrow and mental anguish, thus causing her death at the age of 20.

His second wife was Herminia Alcantara Garchitorena. They had five children together: Aurora, Gloria, Soledad, Jose Salvador, Jr. and Josefina.

== Post-War Life ==
Gen. Jose Salvador settled in General Santos City in the 1930s with brothers Joaquin, Francisco and Pedro Manuel. He became a Haciendero and owned vast tracts of land.

== Death ==
Gen. Jose Salvador Natividad died in 1954. He was buried in a cemetery in Davao City, Davao del Sur Province, Davao, Philippines.
