= Jose Clemente Zulueta =

Philippine historian and bibliographer (1876–1904)

José Clemente Zulueta
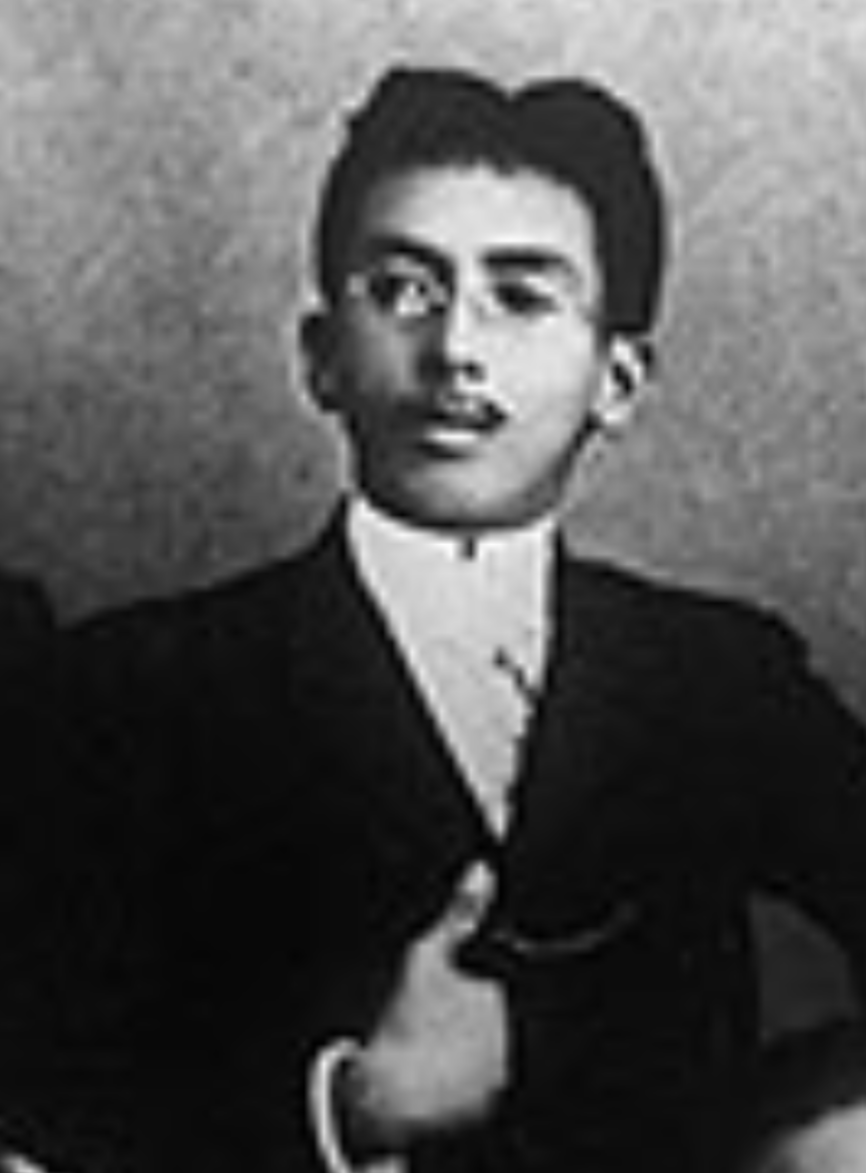
- Zulueta as a staff of the La Independencia newspaper, c. 1898

Member of the Malolos Congress from Balabac
- In office September 15, 1898 – November 13, 1899

Personal details
- Born: November 23, 1876 Paco, Manila, Captaincy General of the Philippines, Spanish Empire
- Died: September 10, 1904 (aged 27) Manila, Philippine Islands
- Spouse: Paz Alejandrino Natividad
- Nickname: Peping

Military service
- Allegiance: First Philippine Republic
- Branch/service: Philippine Revolutionary Army
- Battles/wars: Philippine Revolution

José Clemente Zulueta y Estrada (November 23, 1876 – September 10, 1904) was a Filipino writer, Philippine Revolution historian and bibliographer. Together with General Mamerto Natividad, he wrote the proclamation entitled "To The Brave Sons of the Philippines", which called for the expulsion of the friars from the Philippines. He chronicled the Philippine Revolution and was later appointed Collecting Librarian for the insular government by the Philippine Commission. He favored the rewriting of Philippine history, giving importance to the indigenous element (elemento indígena).

== Early life ==
José Clemente Zulueta, was born in Paco, Manila on November 23, 1876. His mother died five days after his birth and his father died while he was still a child. Orphaned at a very young age, he was raised by Agustin de la Rosa and Juliana Estrada. The couple raised him as their own and gave him the nickname, "Peping". They enrolled him at the old College of San Antonio de Padua and in Ateneo Municipal, where he obtained his Bacheller en Artes. He took up law at the University of Santo Tomas where he achieved literary celebrity status as a weaver of exquisite Spanish verses. His poem Afectos a la Virgen was awarded third prize in 1895 with a lirio de plata (silver lily) by the Academia Bibliografico Mariana of Lerida, Spain. It was published in Revista Catolica de Filipina, VII, no. 5, March 1, 1896. During his student days, he organized a study group among his friends with whom he expounded on philosophy, arithmetic and algebra, ethics, rhetoric and poetry. He frequently attended the entresuelo meetings of young students like Cecilio Apostol, Fernando Ma. Guerrero, Rafael Palma, Jose Abreau, among others, to where discussions on literature and social issues took place.

== Revolutionary period ==
In 1896, Zulueta's studies were interrupted by the revolution that broke out. He decided he wanted to record all the military activities of the revolution and presented his purpose to Governor General Camilio de Polavieja, who gave him a permit to cross Spanish battle lines. His friendships with Filipino revolutionary leaders also gave him access to the Filipino battle lines. He was beside the deathbed of his friend, General Flaviano Yengko, who succumbed to gunshot wounds on March 3, 1897. Much to the disappointment of his friends, he remained impartial in his writings as a recorder of the revolution.

At the Biak Na Bato Headquarters, Gen. Emilio Aguinaldo issued a proclamation drafted for him by Jose Clemente Zulueta and General Mamerto Natividad, Aguinaldo's second in command. The proclamation was entitled "To The Brave Sons of the Philippines". It called for the expulsion of the friars, return of land to Filipinos, freedom of press, religious tolerance and legal equality. The tenth paragraph describes the aspirations of the Philippine Revolution:

Mindful of the common good, we aspire to the glory of obtaining liberty, independence and honor for the country. We aspire to have common law, created for all citizens, which will serve them as a guarantee and assurance of respect, without exception. We aspire to have a government which will represent all the active forces of the country, in which will take part the most capable, the most worthy in virtues and talents, without regard to their birth, their wealth, or the face to which they belong. We desire that no friar shall set his foot on any part of the Archipelago, and that no convent or monastery or center of corruption, or partisans of that theocracy which has made this land another inquisitorial Spain, shall remain. In our ranks order shall always be respected.

Later on, he worked with Pedro A. Paterno in negotiating the Pact of Biak Na Bato, a peace treaty between the Spanish government and the Filipinos, signed in December 1897, thereby, temporarily ending the war.

Zulueta eventually ceased his impartiality. He joined the Revolutionary Army when Gen. Emilio Aguinaldo returned from Hong Kong in May, 1898. Zulueta witnessed the Declaration of Philippine Independence on June 12, 1898, and continued to record succeeding events of the war. On June 20, 1898, wanting to exercise freedom of the press which the revolution fought for, he established the newspaper La Libertad with Epifanio de los Santos. The first issue was dedicated to Colonel Pacheco, the Secretary Of War of the Departmental Government in Central Luzon. This newspaper was unfortunately short lived as the newspaper was seized by the revolutionary government. Zulueta immediately joined another newspaper, La Independencia, which was founded by General Antonio Luna on September 3, 1898. In his writings, Zulueta used M. Kaun as his penname. Because of his background in law and his writing prowess, Zulueta was elected member of the Constitutional Convention that drafted the Constitution of the First Philippine Republic. On June 9, 1899, in Cabanatuan, President Emilio Aguinaldo appointed him Secretary of Foreign Affairs, replacing Felipe Buencamino.

== Lawyer, librarian, and professor ==
In the latter part of 1899, Zulueta returned to Manila and resumed his law studies. He took the bar examination in 1902. Others who took the bar exam that year were Manuel Quezon, Sergio Osmeña, and Juan Sumulong. Zulueta's love for writing kept him from practicing law. He collaborated with Don Modesto Reyes in establishing the newspaper, La Union, which General Elwell S. Otis later banned because of its anti-American content.

The Philippine Commission, a commission appointed by the President of the United States, and at the time, headed by William Howard Taft, tasked Zulueta to collect the art and literary materials for exhibition in the Louisiana Purchase Exposition. On March 17, 1903, the Philippine Commission also passed Act 688, authorizing the appointment of a Collecting Librarian for the insular government. Jose Clemente Zulueta was chosen for this position. As provided by law, his duties were stated as follows: "…whose duty it shall be, under the supervision and direction of the Civil Governor, to visit the countries of Europe, Mexico, and elsewhere for the purpose of purchasing books and manuscripts relating to the history of the Philippine Islands, making historical researches into said history, procuring copies of official documents relating thereto, with the view to the foundation in Manila of a public historical library upon the subject of the Philippine Islands."

To fulfill his duties as Collecting Librarian, Zulueta sailed for Marseilles on April 29, 1903. He proceeded to Barcelona and Madrid where he presented his credentials to the American minister in the capital. He worked in the Biblioteca Nacional and in the Museo Biblioteca de Ultramar, which had its origin from the materials exhibited during the Exposicion General de Filipinas. He discovered a rich collection of papers and documents among which gave importance to Governor Valdes y Tamon's work Las Plazas, Castillos, Fuerzas, y Presidios de las Provincias sugetas a su Real Dominio en las Yslas Philipinas under the orders of the Magestad Cathólica (Dios le guarde) in 1839. Zulueta also found in the Biblioteca de la Real Academia de la Historia the unpublished work of Father Francisco Ignacio Alcina's Relacion. At the King's College, he saw the Vocabulario Tagalo, dated 1585, a manuscript compiled by Fr. Domingo de los Santos, printed in the town of Tayabas in 1703.

As required by law, Zulueta wrote a report entitled Fuentes Historicos de Filipinas in June 1904. He returned to Manila on July 30, 1904. The historical documents he obtained from foreign archives became known as the "Zulueta Papers". They were deposited in the National Library. Unfortunately, this priceless historical collection was destroyed when the National Library burned down during the liberation of Manila in February 1945.

Zulueta subsequently joined the faculty of Liceo de Manila and taught subjects on Philippine and World History. He served as librarian at the Centro Artistico and Club Internacional, which sent members on fellowship grants to the United States. The first to receive such grant was the City Engineer, Santiago Artiaga.

== Marriage and family life ==
In 1899, Jose Clemente Zulueta married Paz "Pacita" Alejandrino Natividad, a younger sister of General Mamerto Natividad. They had three children: Carlos "Carling" Natividad Zulueta, Gloria Natividad Zulueta, and Judge Jose "Peping" Natividad Zulueta.

== Death ==
Jose Clemente Zulueta did not live long enough to realize his dream to write what he considered genuine history of the Philippines, a history taken from the Filipino point of view with the "characteristics of the indigenous elements in the history of the Philippines." He succumbed to illness and died in Manila on September 10, 1904. He was only 27 years old. His efforts and ideas were further championed by Felipe G. Calderon and supported by Trinidad Pardo de Tavera, Pedro Paterno, and Epifanio de los Santos.

== Legacy ==
Jose Clemente Zulueta is known as the Historian Of The Revolution. He was one of the early Filipino historians who advocated Philippine history from the Filipino point of view. A true pioneer in Philippine historiography, he favored the rewriting of Philippine history, giving importance to the indigenous element (elemento indígena). Because of his dedication to history and the belief in the importance of chronicling the war, he encouraged his brother-in-law, Col. Joaquin Natividad, to write about the war events in Northern Luzon. Joaquin later became a chronicler of other revolutionary events.
