= Ludovico Hidrosollo =

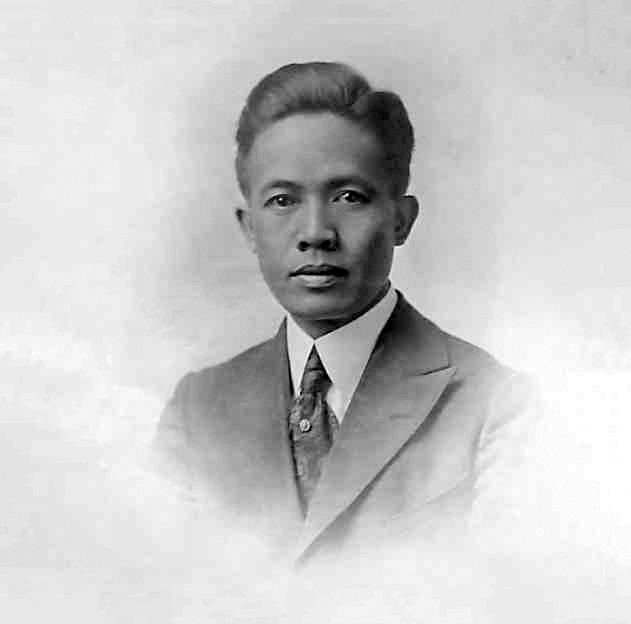
- Hidrosollo in 1920

Senator of the Philippines from the 12th district
- In office 2 June 1931 – 5 June 1934 Serving with Jamalul Kiram II
- Appointed by: Dwight F. Davis
- Preceded by: Hadji Butu
- Succeeded by: Juan Gaerlan

11th Governor of Capiz
- In office 1947–1951
- Preceded by: Cornelio Villareal
- Succeeded by: Eduardo Abalo

Personal details
- Born: September 2, 1885 Dumarao, Capiz, Captaincy General of the Philippines
- Died: 1962 (aged 76–77)
- Party: Nacionalista
- Spouse: Concepcion Mapa

Ludovico Advíncula Hidrosollo (September 2, 1885 – 1962) was a Filipino politician.

== Biography ==
Ludovico Hidrosollo was born on September 2, 1885, in Dumarao, Capiz. Hidrosollo studied agriculture at the University of Michigan at the expense of the US government. He returned to the Philippines in 1908 and became the first Filipino teacher in Dumarao. He was later promoted to supervising teacher in Ilog in Negros Occidental. In 1922, he was appointed Director of Non-Christian Tribes by Governor General Leonard Wood.

In 1931, Hidrosollo was appointed to the Senate of the Philippines by Governor General Dwight F. Davis to represent the 12th district comprising the non-Christian majority regions of the Cordilleras and Mindanao, serving until 1934. During this period he also served on the board of trustees of the University of the Philippines. In 1947, Hidrosollo was elected governor of Capiz, serving until 1951.

Hidrosollo died in 1962. He was married to Concepcion Mapa.
