= Benito Natividad =

Filipino military leader (1875—1964)

Benito Alejandrino Natividad
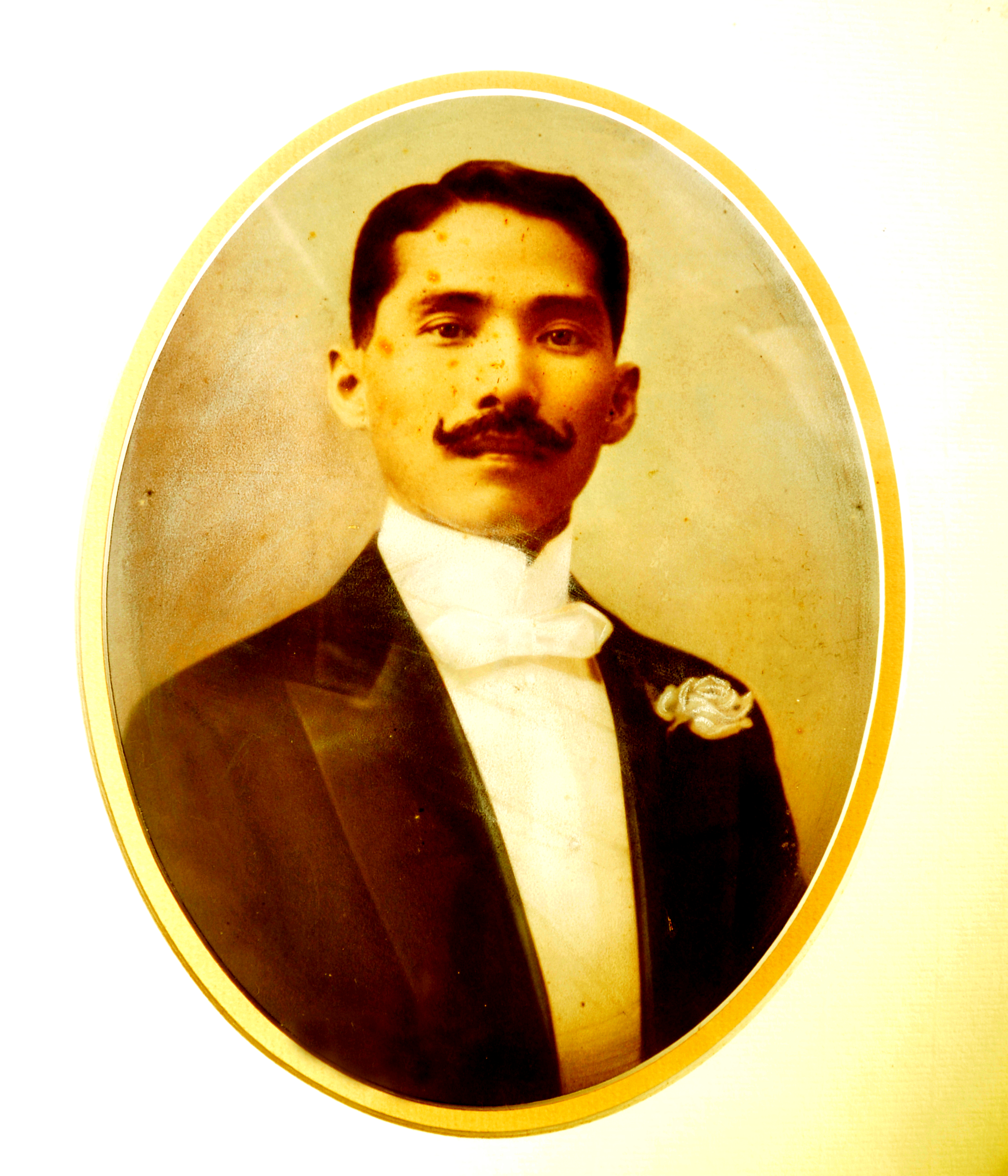
- Natividad in c. 1915

6th Governor of Nueva Ecija
- In office 1910–1913
- Preceded by: Lucio Gonzales
- Succeeded by: Feliciano Ramoso

Member of the Nueva Ecija Provincial Board
- In office 1907–1910

Personal details
- Born: Benito Natividad y Alejandrino; January 12, 1875 Jaen, Nueva Ecija, Captaincy General of the Philippines
- Died: December 1, 1964 (aged 89) Manila, Philippines
- Resting place: San Agustin Church, Intramuros
- Party: Nacionalista
- Spouse: Amalia Inocencio Jaime (m. 1915)
- Relations: Gen. Mamerto Alejandrino Natividad Jr. (brother); Gen. Jose Salvador Alejandrino Natividad (brother); Deflina Herbosa de Natividad (sister-in-law); José Alejandrino (uncle)
- Children: Aurea Natividad Salcedo; Amparo Natividad Syquia† Palou
- Education: Colegio de San Juan de Letran
- Occupation: Politician, soldier, fiscal, judge
- Profession: Lawyer

Military service
- Allegiance: First Philippine Republic; Republic of Biak-na-Bato; Katipunan
- Branch/service: Philippine Revolutionary Army
- Rank: Brigadier General
- Battles/wars: Philippine Revolution; Philippine–American War

Benito Natividad y Alejandrino (January 12, 1875 – December 1, 1964) was a military leader, a governor and a judge. His parents were Gervasia Alejandrino and Mamerto Natividad, Sr. a lawyer and the First Martyr of Nueva Ecija who was executed by the Spanish authorities on Sept. 26, 1896 in San Isidro, Nueva Ecija. He fought in the Philippine Revolution against Spain and was exiled to Hong Kong with Aguinaldo and other revolutionaries in accordance with the Treaty of Biak Na Bato. He also fought in the Philippine–American War and was one of the last to surrender together with Gen. Manuel Tinio, after the capture of Aguinaldo. He was wounded twice in battle.

== Philippine Revolution ==
Together with his brother Mamerto Jr., Benito joined the Katipunan to avenge their father's death. The Spaniards retaliated by burning their house and sugar mills at Jaen, Nueva Ecija. Thereafter, Benito and five of his brothers traveled to Binakayan, Cavite, where they were the house guests of Baldomero Aguinaldo. All six brothers fought in the Philippine rebellion against the Spanish authorities. In Pintong Bato, Imus, Cavite, Benito was first wounded in battle.

== Pact Of Biak-Na-Bato ==
Benito Natividad was one of those who signed the Biak-na-Bato Constitution and was later exiled to Hong Kong together with Gen. Emilio Aguinaldo in 1897. He returned to the Philippines to continue fighting against the Spaniards.

== Philippine–American War ==
At the outbreak of the war with the Americans, the then Colonel Benito Natividad served as an aide to Lieutenant General Antonio Luna and distinguished himself for valorous conduct in the Central Luzon campaigns. In the Battle of Bagbag during the Philippine–American War in 1899, he was almost killed fighting by the side of Luna, suffering a serious bullet wound in the leg. His relative and comrade in arms Hortencio Batu and a young Lieutenant Manuel L. Quezon hid Natividad in a hay stack until they were able to retrieve him. Manuel L. Quezon was later promoted to captain for getting Natividad safe behind the lines. At age 24, Natividad was promoted to Brigadier General for this act, becoming one of the youngest generals to fight the Americans.

The wounds were serious enough to disable Natividad for some time and it also served as a blessing in disguise because, had he been physically fit, he would have been with Luna during that fatal trip to Cabanatuan.

When Brigadier General Manuel Tinio was recalled by Aguinaldo and ordered to help him in the reorganization of the forces in Nueva Ecija in June 1899, Benito temporarily took over command of the Ilocos provinces.

He became a cripple due to his wounds, which healed quickly but were never operated on, earning him the moniker El Cojo from Spanish and American prisoners in Vigan.

In September 1899, Tinio and his army of the north were finally called to the frontline to guard the beaches of Pangasinan and La Union but Natividad stayed behind as post commander in Vigan.

He remained together with some officers and 50 riflemen who, together, with the 20 men in Bangued and a few others scattered in neighboring towns – less than a company in all — made up the only armed insurgent force that guarded the whole Ilocos region at that time. Aside from safeguarding territories, they also had to deal with the guarding of 4,000 Spanish prisoners (including one general) and 25 American prisoners of war scattered in those towns. Even if the large number of prisoners could overpower Natividad's men, they did not even think to rise against the general because they were treated very well and deemed El Cojo, a man not to fool with.

After Tinio reassumed command of the Ilocos provinces three months later, Natividad decided to cast his lot with the Tinio Brigade and participated actively in its operations. In spite of his wounds, he refused to give himself up to the Americans. Dragging his right leg, Benito chose to remain with the Tinio Brigade when they took to the mountains to wage guerrilla warfare.

Natividad's bravery and persistence were described by fellow guerrilla, Juan Villamor:

"This Filipino military chief held tenaciously to the ideal of the Filipino war notwithstanding his helplessness as a result of his wounds, one of which compelled him to drag his right leg, making it very difficult for him to climb the mountains, preferring instead to take his luck with the Brigade in its guerrilla operation, rather than surrender himself to the enemy as others had done."

== Surrender ==
The Americans occupied Vigan on November 27, 1900. Natividad moved out with the Spanish and American prisoners the day before and brought the news to Tinio in Abra.

When offered a proposition for peace by the Americans, Natividad, together with all other guerrilla leaders present, resolved that "the final action of the Tinio Brigade should depend upon the decision of the Honorable President." It was heroic of these young men to agree upon a noble decision such as this at a time when they were not even sure if Aguinaldo was still alive and when rumors were in fact out that he had already died.

The Americans, after conquering Filipino forces in Abra, launched a concerted attack on Tinio's forces in Ilocos Sur. Tinio's forces managed to thwart the Americans until April 30, 1901, before surrendering the next day to Brigadier General J. Franklin Bell at Sinait. (Aguinaldo was captured on March 23, 1901, at his headquarters in Palanan by Brigadier General Frederick Funston.)

Included in the surrender were Natividad, Tinio, Colonel Joaquin Alejandrino, Lieutenant Colonel J. Vicente Salazar, Captain Feliciano Ramoso and 23 other officers with 350 riflemen attached to the headquarters command of the Tinio Brigade. The May 8, 1901 issue of the newspaper La Fraternidad reads, "The first day of May is now for two reasons an important date in contemporary Philippine history -- 1898 the destruction of the Spanish squadron in Cavite; 1901, the surrender of Generals Tinio and Natividad and the complete pacification of Northern Luzon."

In his book, The Tinio Brigade, Orlino Ochosa writes, "And who cannot help but admire the very examples of Generals Tinio and Natividad or Colonel Alejandrino and Salazar? These non-Ilocanos never abandoned their Ilocano followers even during their most difficult and trying times; in fact, they never abandoned the cause of the republica...not even after Aguinaldo's fall, until every guerrilla band and every Katipunan junta in Ilocos had been destroyed so as to render further resistance futile and senseless."

== Lawyer, judge, and politician ==
He continued his law studies at San Juan de Letran, became a full-fledged lawyer, and rose to become a judge.

He tried politics under the Nacionalista Party and won as board member of Nueva Ecija from 1907 to 1910. He was elected governor of Nueva Ecija in 1910 and served until 1913. During his term as governor, he was responsible for the construction of the concrete provincial jail building which survived the destructive blows of World War II. The building also housed the Court of First Instance. He also appropriated funds to fast-track the building of roads and bridges linking the remote towns and municipalities to then provincial capital Cabanatuan.

He successively served as provincial fiscal in the province of Zambales in 1913, Tarlac from 1913 to 1914, Cavite in 1914, Rizal from 1914 to 1916, Samar from 1916 to 1917, Albay from 1917 to 1924, and Leyte from 1924 to 1927.

He was promoted to judge of the Court of First Instance of Leyte on January 1, 1927. On October 3, 1938, he was appointed Judge of the Court of First Instance of Cebu, 3rd Branch. He also served as a judge in Davao.

He served as the Premier Vice President of the Veterans Association of the Revolution, whose President was Gen. Emilio Aguinaldo. He was appointed member of the Board on Pensions for Veterans, an agency under the Department of National Defense, on July 20, 1955 by President Ramon Magsaysay.

== Marriage ==
In 1915, Benito Natividad got married at the age of 40 to Amalia Inocencio Jaime, granddaughter of Maximo Inocencio, who was one of the 13 Martyrs of Cavite. She was 10 years his junior.

They had two daughters, Aurea and Amparo.

== Death ==
His war-time wounds kept bothering him in old age, especially during cold months. But he lived long enough to play golf in the early 1960s and to see June 12 declared as Independence Day.

Reflecting on the past, he mentioned to his daughters that:

He could forgive the Spaniards but never the Americans because of their deception.

Natividad died on December 1, 1964. His remains are interred at the San Agustin Church in Intramuros.
