= Pastor Salazar =

Filipino politician (1891–1952)

Pastor D. Salazar
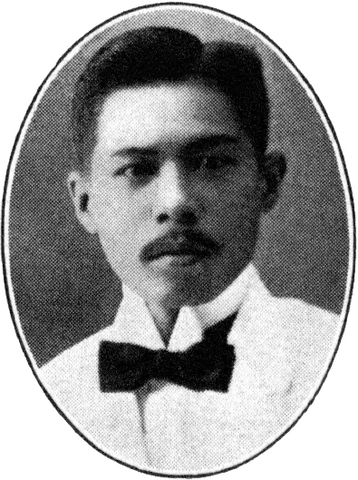
- Salazar as member of the Philippine House of Representatives, c. 1917

Senator of the Philippines from the 9th District
- In office December 30, 1926 – June 5, 1928 Serving with Jose Maria Veloso
- Preceded by: Tomás Gómez
- Succeeded by: Jose Avelino

Member of the House of Representatives of the Philippine Islands from Samar's 2nd district
- In office October 16, 1916 – June 6, 1922
- Preceded by: José Sabarre
- Succeeded by: Pascual Azanza

Personal details
- Born: Pastor Salazar y Dacutan; 1891 Paranas, Samar, Captaincy General of the Philippines
- Died: November 1, 1952 (aged 60–61) Tacloban, Leyte, Philippines
- Party: Nacionalista

Pastor Salazar y Dacutan (1891 – November 2, 1952) was a Filipino politician.

== Early life ==
Pastor Salazar was born in 1891 and worked as a lawyer. In 1924, he cofounded the Holy Infant College in Tacloban, Leyte.

== Political career ==
In 1916, he was elected to the Philippine House of Representatives representing the 2nd district of the undivided Samar, serving until 1922. Following the death of Tomás Gómez, Salazar was elected to fill his Senate seat in special elections held in 1926 representing the 9th senatorial district composed of Leyte and Samar. He served until 1928.

In 1940, he was elected to the Leyte Provincial Board and became acting governor of Leyte during the Japanese occupation and a delegate of the province to the 1943 constitutional convention which ratified the constitution of the puppet Second Philippine Republic. After the war, he was tried for collaboration.
