= Carlos Tan =

Filipino politician from Leyte

The Honorable Carlos Tan
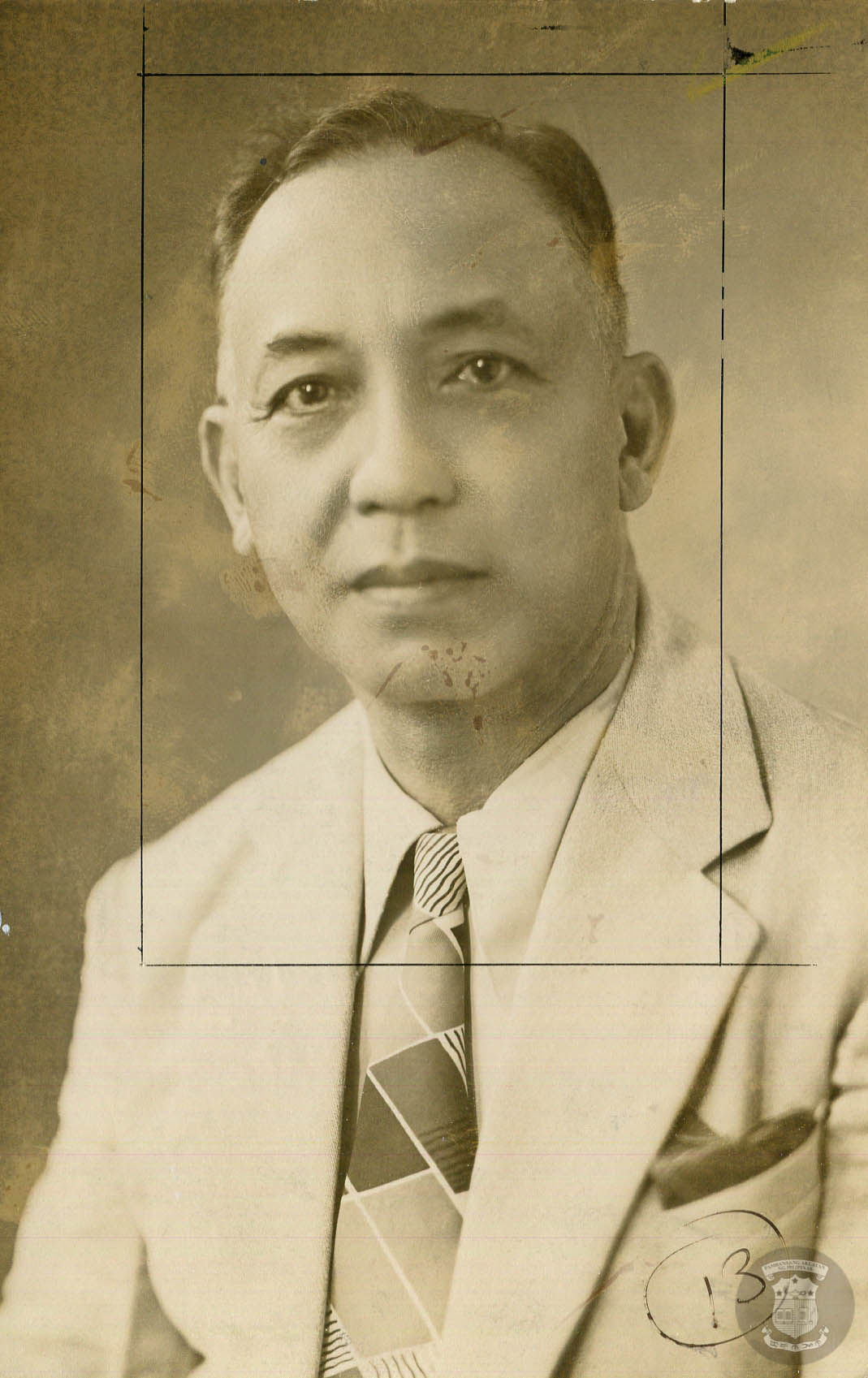

Member of the Philippine House of Representatives from Leyte's 1st district Member of National Assembly (1938–1941)
- In office December 30, 1953 – December 30, 1957
- Preceded by: Mateo Canonoy
- Succeeded by: Marcelino Veloso
- In office May 25, 1946 – November 11, 1947
- Preceded by: Mateo Canonoy
- Succeeded by: José Martínez
- In office December 30, 1938 – December 30, 1941
- Preceded by: Jose Maria Veloso
- Succeeded by: District dissolved
- In office June 2, 1931 – September 16, 1935
- Preceded by: Bernardo Torres
- Succeeded by: Jose Maria Veloso
- In office June 6, 1922 – June 2, 1925
- Preceded by: Francisco Enage
- Succeeded by: Juan Veloso

Senator of the Philippines
- In office December 30, 1947 – December 16, 1949

Personal details
- Born: November 4, 1893 Ormoc, Leyte, Captaincy General of the Philippines
- Died: June 10, 1970 (aged 76)
- Party: Liberal (1946–1970); Nacionalista (until 1946)
- Spouse: Isabel Mirasol
- Children: 2
- Education: Colegio de San Carlos; Colegio de San Juan de Letran; Manila High School; University of the Philippines
- Occupation: Politician
- Profession: Lawyer
- Nickname: Carling

Carlos Salvatierra Tan (November 4, 1893 – June 10, 1976) was a Filipino politician who served as Senator in the 1st Congress of the Philippines.

== Personal life ==
Carlos Tan was born in Ormoc, Leyte to Pablo Tan and Rosalia Salvatierra.

Tan attended Colegio de San Carlos, Colegio de San Juan de Letran, Manila High School and the University of the Philippines. He is a holder of the degree of Bachelor of Arts and Bachelor of Laws and was admitted to the bar in 1915.

He was married to Isabel Mirasol of Jaro, Iloilo City.

== Public service ==
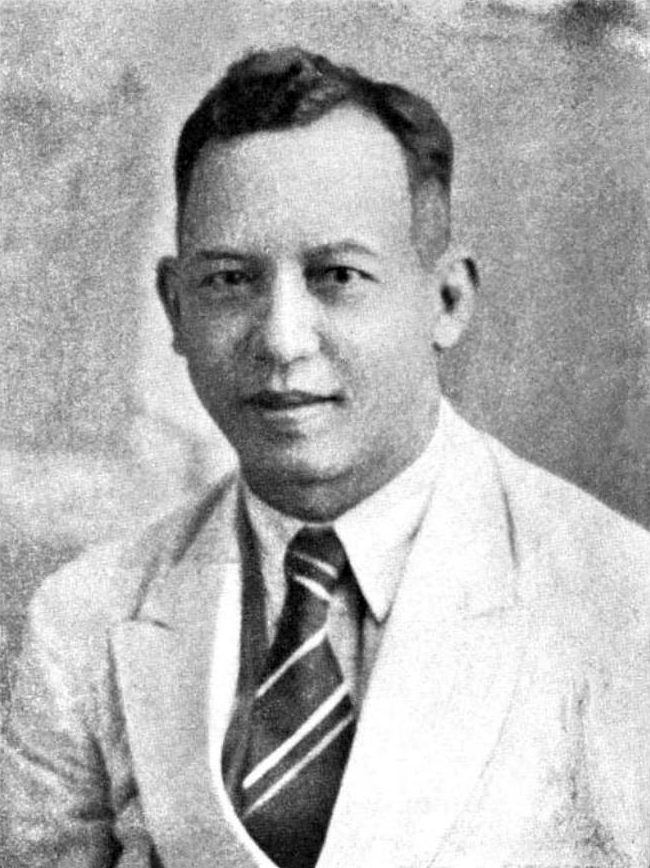
Photograph from The Commercial & Industrial Manual of the Philippines, 1941

He was elected as municipal councilor of Ormoc, Leyte and later became representative to the Philippine Legislature from Leyte's 1st district from 1922 to 1925 and again from 1931 to 1935. In November 1938, he was elected assemblyman for the same district from 1938 to 1941 and once again representative after the World War II from 1946 to 1947. He was elected Senator in 1947 placing 8th out of the 8 seats up for election but was unseated as per decision of the Senate Electoral Tribunal on December 16, 1949 due to an electoral protest. He later returned as representative of the same district, serving from 1953 to 1957.
