= José Alejandrino =

Philippine general and senator (1870–1951)

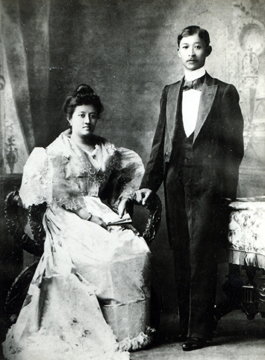
- Alejandrino with his wife in c. 1901

Senator of the Philippines from the 12th senatorial district
- In office November 13, 1923 – July 14, 1928
- Appointed by: Leonard Wood
- Preceded by: Teofisto Guingona Sr.
- Succeeded by: Manuel Camus

3rd Governor of Pampanga
- In office 1900–1901
- Preceded by: Francisco Dizon
- Succeeded by: Frederick Dent Grant

Minister of Agriculture, Industry and Commerce
- In office June 23, 1898 – January 21, 1899
- President: Emilio Aguinaldo
- Preceded by: Position established
- Succeeded by: Gracio Gonzaga (as Minister of Welfare)

Member of the Malolos Congress
- In office September 15, 1898 – November 13, 1899
- Constituency: Catanduanes

Personal details
- Born: José Cándido Alejandrino y Magdangal; December 1, 1870 Binondo, Manila, Captaincy General of the Philippines
- Died: June 1, 1951 (aged 80) Manila, Philippines
- Resting place: Manila North Cemetery
- Party: Popular Front (1941); Democrata (1923–1928); Independent (1898–1901)
- Relations: Mamerto Natividad Sr. (brother-in-law); Mamerto Natividad (nephew); Jose Salvador Alejandrino Natividad (nephew); Benito Natividad (nephew)
- Education: Ateneo de Manila University; University of Santo Tomas (BA); University of Ghent (MS)
- Occupation: Politician
- Profession: Engineer

Military service
- Allegiance: First Philippine Republic
- Branch/service: Philippine Republican Army
- Years of service: 1896–1901
- Rank: Major General
- Battles/wars: Philippine Revolution; Philippine–American War

José Cándido Alejandrino y Magdangal (December 1, 1870 – June 1, 1951) was a Philippine Republican Army general during the Philippine Revolution and the Philippine–American War.

He was also a senator from the Twelfth Senatorial District of the Philippines.

== Early life ==
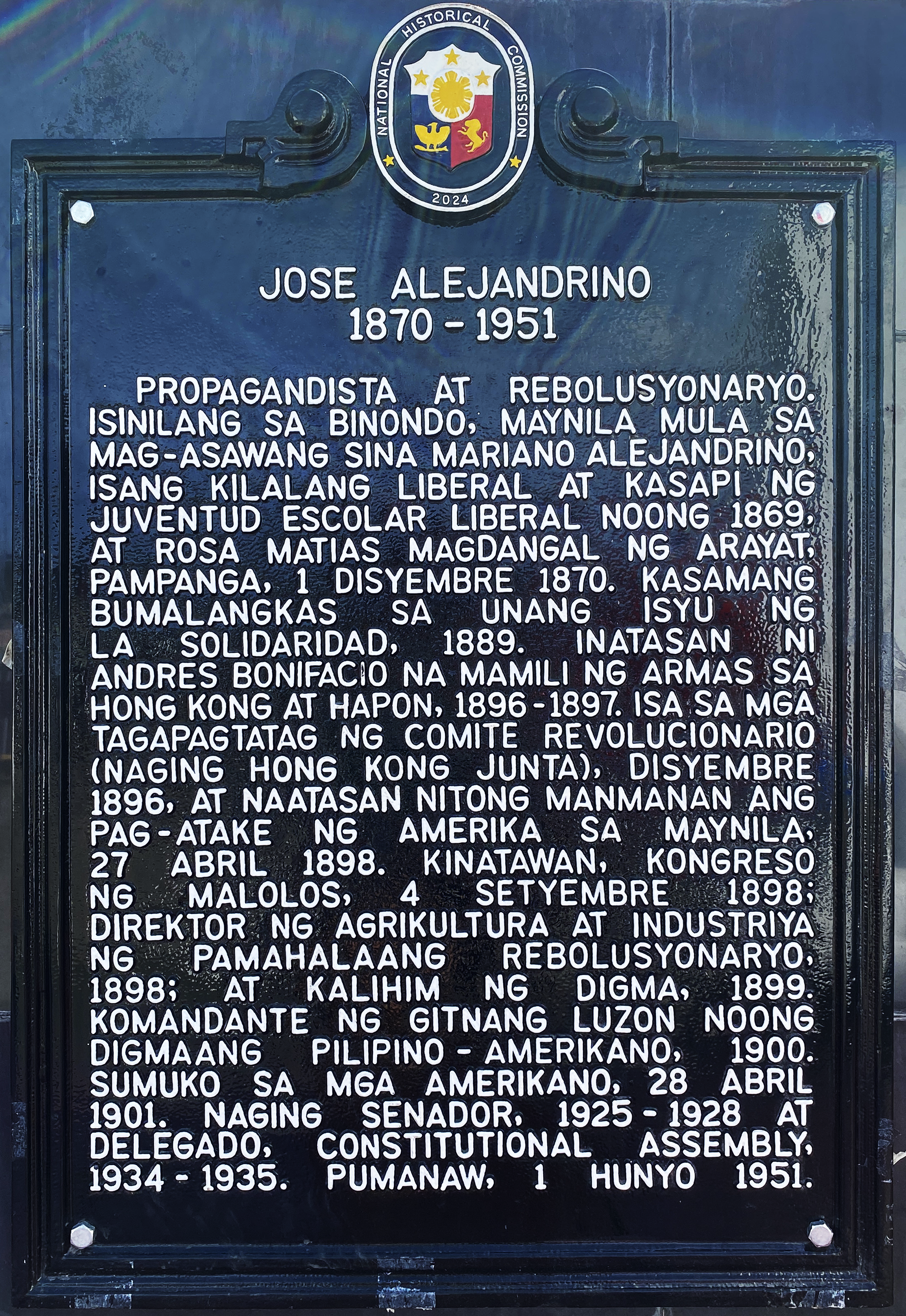
Historical marker installed in 2025 at Alejandrino's monument in Arayat, Pampanga

Alejandrino was born to a wealthy family from Arayat, Pampanga, on December 1, 1870 in Manila. He initially studied at the Ateneo Municipal de Manila, and his contemporaries there included José Rizal, Juan Araneta, Cayetano Arellano, and Apolinario Mabini, among others. He acquired his Bachelor of Arts degree at the University of Santo Tomas, and pursued studies in Spain and at the University of Ghent, where he graduated with a degree in chemical engineering.

== Propaganda Movement ==
While in Spain, he was one of the members of the Propaganda Movement which demanded equality, especially equal opportunities in the colonial administration, for Spaniards and Filipinos. He was also a contributor to La Solidaridad, an organization composed of Filipino liberals living abroad since 1872, mostly attending different universities across Europe. The group aimed to increase Spanish awareness of the needs of its colony, the Philippines, and to foster a closer relationship between the archipelago and Spain. Alejandrino helped José Rizal in correcting errors in the El filibusterismo, which was published in Ghent, Belgium. He also helped distribute copies of the said manuscript.

When Aguinaldo accepted the offer, Alejandrino proceeded to Hong Kong, where he helped organise the Consejo Revolucionario along with Felipe Agoncillo, José Maria Basa and Mariano Ponce. Later, he became part of the group in the Hong Kong Committee, which included Agoncillo and Galicano Apacible, who was the head of La solidaridad, which advocated Philippines independence, as opposed to the circle led by Basa and Doroteo Cortes, who were for annexation by the United States. In February 1897, Alejandrino went to Japan in hopes of acquiring more weapons for the revolutionaries. He was with Aguinaldo when the latter was exiled to Hong Kong in accordance to the Pact of Biak-na-Bato, which was signed on December 14, 1897.

== Philippine–American War and postwar life ==
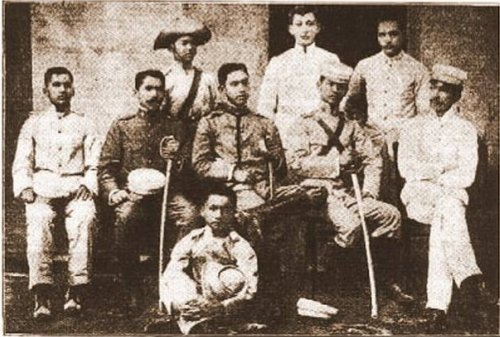
Group showing Brigadier General Manuel Tinio (seated, center), Brigadier General Benito Natividad (seated, 2nd from right), Lieutenant Colonel Jose Alejandrino (seated, 2nd from left), and their aides-de-camp.

In 1898, Alejandrino served in the Malolos Congress, becoming a member of the two committees that drafted the Malolos Constitution. On 26 September, he was given the post of Director of Agriculture, Industry and Commerce. Later, Aguinaldo designated Alejandrino chief of the engineers of the Army, and he directed the building of trenches in several areas, including Bulacan and Caloocan.

Alejandrino and his friend, General Antonio Luna, suggested to President Emilio Aguinaldo that they build a defensive line from Novaliches to Caloocan to delay the northward advance of American troops intent on capturing the railway. This was however not implemented, as General Luna was murdered by troops loyal to Aguinaldo. The president was later captured and unconditionally surrendered to General Frederick Funston on April 29, 1901. On April 12, 1901, Alejandrino married Adela Chuidian, daughter of the reformist Telesforo Chuidian. In August of the same year, Alejandrino accepted an offer to serve as the second city engineer of Manila. In 1925, Governor-General Leonard Wood made him senator of the Twelfth Senatorial District of the Philippines. He died on June 1, 1951.

== Gallery ==
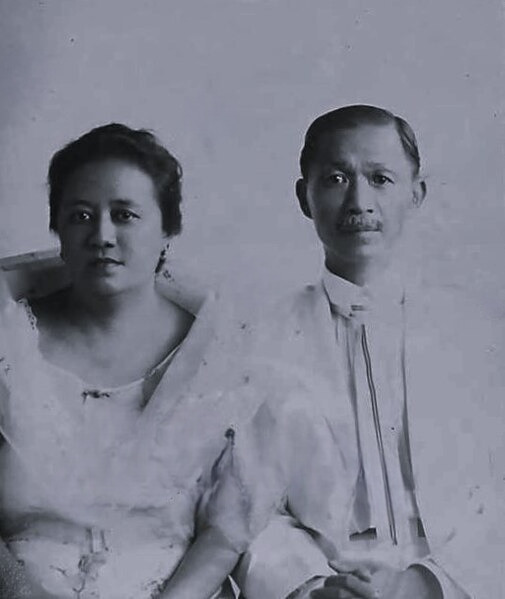
Alejandrino and his wife on their U.S. passport application in 1921

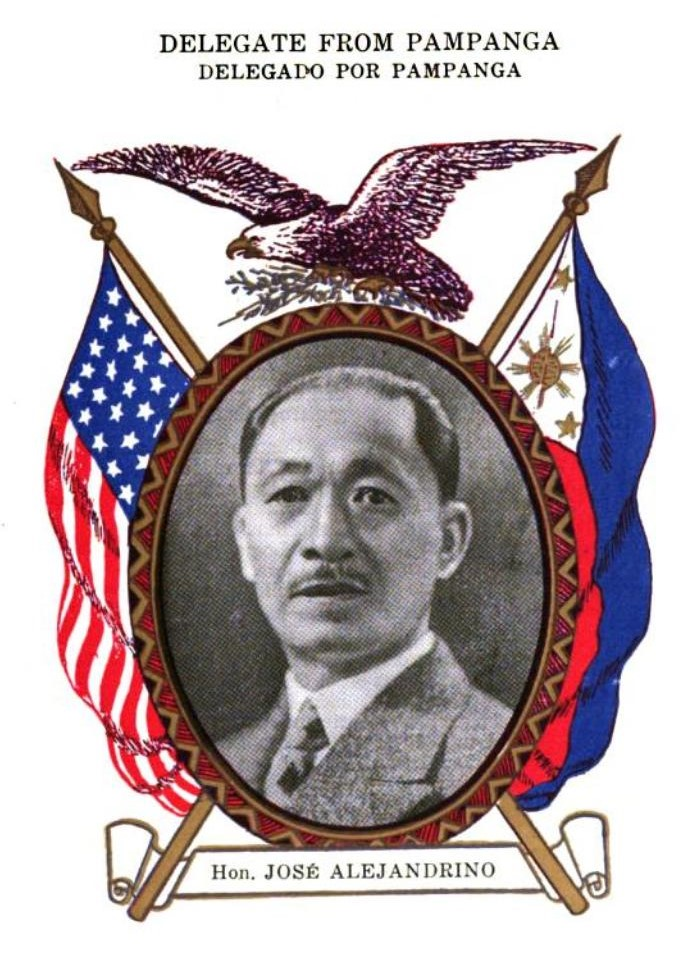
Alejandrino as a delegate to the Philippine Constitutional Convention, published by Benipayo Press (c. 1935)

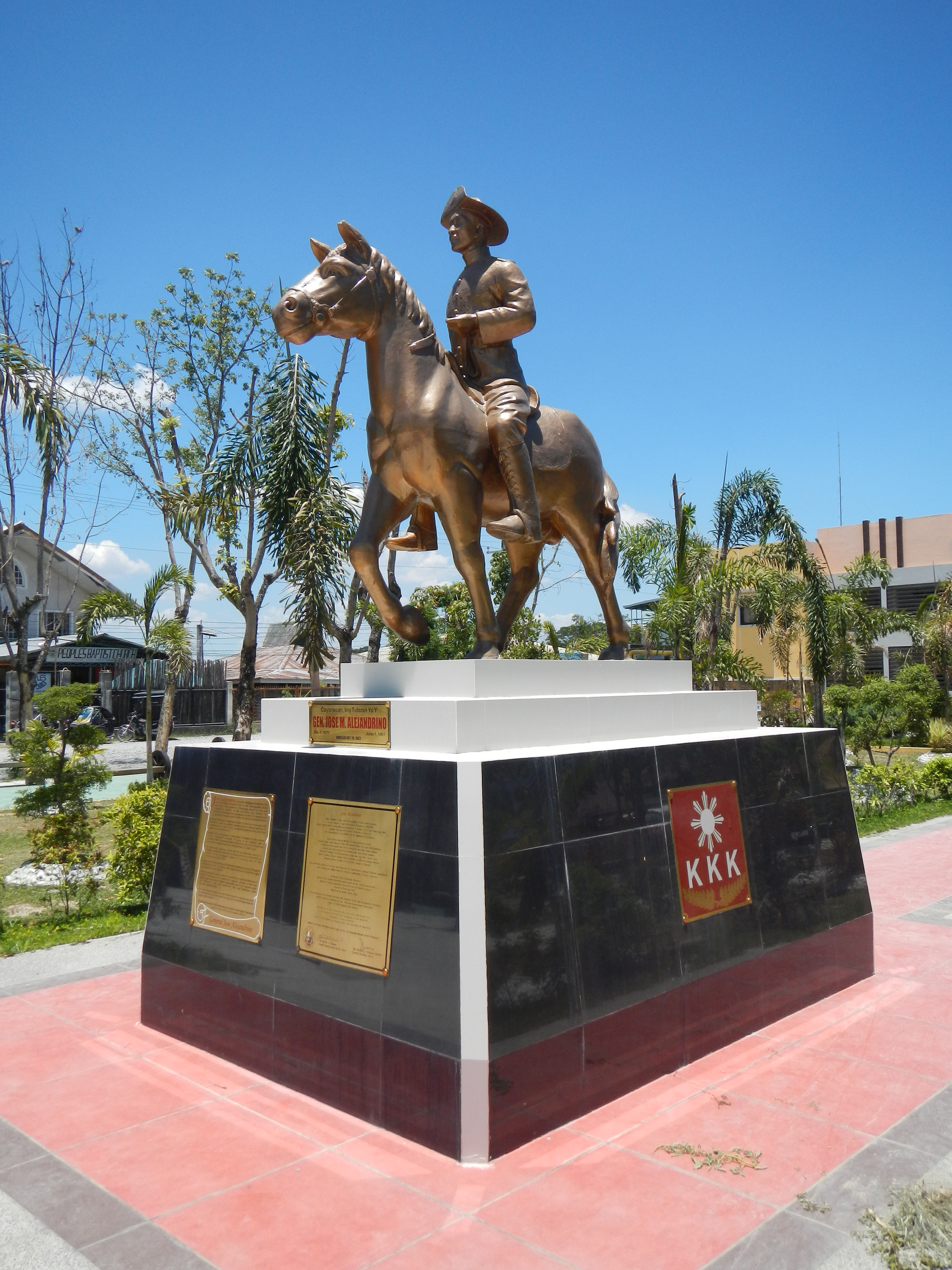
Monument of José Alejandrino in Arayat, Pampanga

== Written works ==
- "Nuestra patria", anticolonial song composed during the Philippine–American War
- La senda del sacrificio (1949)

== Media portrayals ==
- Portrayed by Alvin Anson in the film, Heneral Luna (2015), and its sequel, Goyo: Ang Batang Heneral (2018).
