= Hadji Butu =

Filipino statesman, politician and senator

- حَجِّ بُتُ
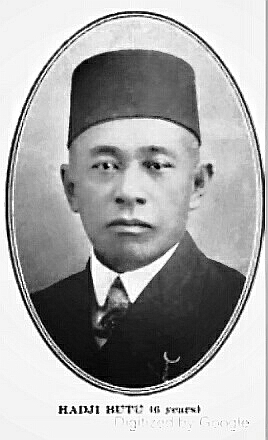
- Butu as a senator, Philippine Education, published 1917

Senator of the Philippines from the 12th district
- In office October 16, 1916 – November 15, 1920
- Appointed by: Francis Burton Harrison
- Preceded by: Position established
- Succeeded by: Teofisto Guingona Sr.
- In office June 6, 1922 – June 2, 1931
- Appointed by: Leonard Wood (1922); Henry L. Stimson (1928)
- Preceded by: Lope K. Santos
- Succeeded by: Ludovico Hidrosollo

Personal details
- Born: 1865 Jolo, Sulu Sultanate
- Died: February 22, 1937 (aged 71–72) Jolo, Sulu, Commonwealth of the Philippines
- Party: Demócrata Party
- Other political affiliations: Nacionalista Party
- Children: 12

Abd ul-Bagui Butu Rasul (1865 – February 22, 1937), better known as Hadji Butu, was a Filipino statesman, politician and senator during the 4th, 6th, 7th, and 8th Philippine Legislatures, representing the 12th senatorial district. He was the first Filipino Muslim senator.

== Early life ==
Hadji Butu was born in Jolo, the capital of the Sulu Sultanate in 1865. He was a descendant of Mantiri Asip, a minister of the Sumatran-born prince Raja Baginda, who helped spread Islam to the Sulu Archipelago in 1390. At the age of ten, Hadji Butu was proficient in both Arabic and the Koran.

== Prime Minister of Sulu ==
At the age of 16, Hadji Butu was appointed as prime minister to Sultan Badar ud-Din II in 1881. The following year, he accompanied the Sultan on his hajj to Mecca, which allowed him to gain the title of Hadji. His extensive contacts with religious scholars there enabled him to be regarded as the foremost Tausug authority on Sharia law and Islamic theology by the time he and the Sultan returned to Jolo in 1883.

Following Sultan Badar ud-Din's death in 1884, Hadji Butu supported the claims to succession of the Sultan's half-brother, Raja Muda Amir ul-Kiram, and persuaded the majority of Tausug datus to support him against other claimants as the situation escalated into a civil war. During this time, Spanish officials intervened and summoned Amir ul-Kiram and another rival, Datu Harun, to Manila. However, Kiram ignored the invitation, after being warned by Hadji Butu of possible Spanish treachery. In retaliation, Governor-General Joaquin Jovellar recognized Datu Harun as the Sultan, and provided him military support to return and claim the throne. Despite Harun's victory and capture of the royal capital of Maimbung, Hadji Butu helped lead an effective resistance movement until he was captured, whereupon he accepted Sultan Harun's offer to become his prime minister in exchange for an end to the fighting. Hadji Butu eventually helped convince Amir ul-Kiram and his followers to surrender.

Under Hadji Butu's advice, Sultan Harun ran into trouble with his Spanish backers for refusing their demands to levy taxes on his subjects for Spain. In 1892, while Hadji Butu was in Sandakan settling land disputes with the British government in Sabah, Amir ul-Kiram's mother conspired with the Spanish to oust Sultan Harun, exiling him to Palawan. Upon returning to Jolo, Hadji Butu was persuaded by Governor-General Ramon Blanco to serve again as prime minister to Amir ul-Kiram, who had assumed the name Jamal ul-Kiram II upon his enthronement in 1894. In 1896, he accompanied the new Sultan on his hajj to Mecca and returned in 1898, shortly before the outbreak of the Spanish-American War.

== American occupation ==
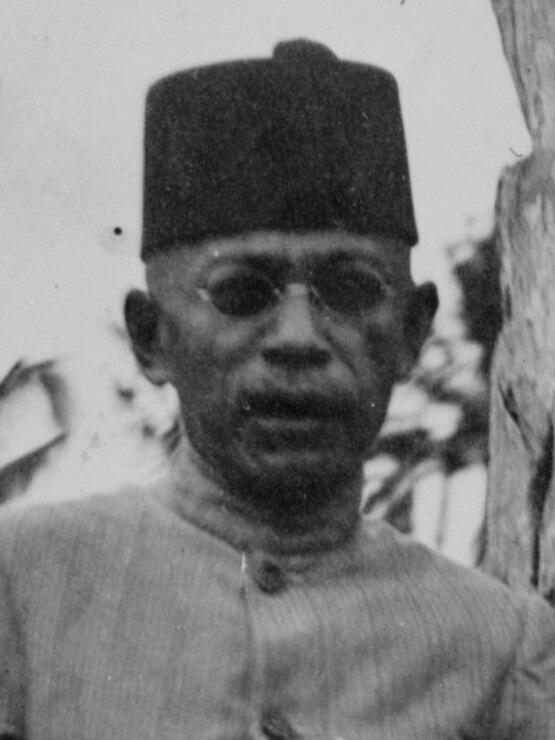
Butu c. 1912

After the Americans occupied Jolo following the outbreak of the Philippine-American War, Hadji Butu, acting on behalf of the Sultan, concluded the Kiram-Bates Treaty with General John C. Bates on August 20, 1899. The agreement saw the Sultan recognizing American sovereignty in exchange for the United States recognizing Sulu as a protectorate and respecting the Islamic faith and customs (including polygamy and slavery) of the Tausugs and not to cede or sell Sulu or any part of it to a foreign power.

In 1904, Hadji Butu was appointed by the Americans to become assistant to the Military Governor of the province. He was eventually promoted in 1913 by Military Governor General John Pershing to become Deputy District Governor of Sulu.

== Senate career ==
In 1915, Hadji Butu was appointed by Governor-General Francis Burton Harrison to the Philippine Senate, representing the 12th Senatorial District, comprising the Department of Mindanao and Sulu, Mountain Province, Baguio, and Nueva Vizcaya. He was the first Muslim to sit in the chamber. He was re-appointed to the body by Governor-General Henry L. Stimson in 1928.

In his senatorial career, Hadji Butu sponsored the establishment of a Philippine Military Academy, a Philippine Naval Academy, and compulsory military instruction in all educational institutions nationwide. He also called for more appropriations for infrastructure in his district. Despite his record of collaboration with the Americans, he actively worked for Philippine independence, supporting the Jones Law of 1916 which established the Senate and provided for more self-governing powers for the Philippines.

Upon the establishment of the Philippine Commonwealth, President Manuel L. Quezon appointed him to the National Language Institute as representative for Mindanao, Sulu and the Tausug people, in 1936.

== Personal life and death ==
Hadji Butu died of kidney disease at his home in Jolo on February 22, 1937. He was 72. He had 12 children.
