= Esteban Singson =

Filipino politician

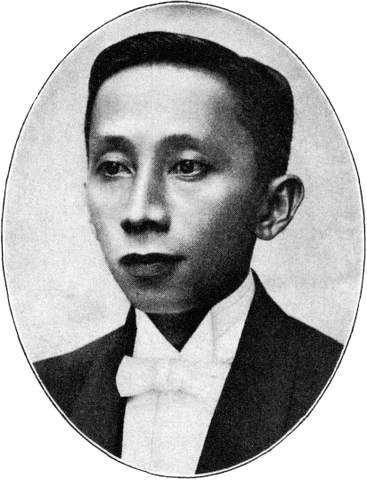
- Official portrait, c. 1917

Senator of the Philippines from the 9th District
- In office October 16, 1916 – June 6, 1922 Serving with Jose Maria Veloso; Francisco Enage
- Preceded by: office established
- Succeeded by: Tomás Gómez

Personal details
- Born: August 13, 1884 Calbiga, Samar, Captaincy General of the Philippines
- Died: Unknown
- Party: Nacionalista

Esteban Quimbo Singson (August 13, 1884 - unknown) was a Filipino politician.

== Biography ==
Esteban Singson was born on August 13, 1884, in Calbiga, Samar. He pursued a Bachelor of Arts degree at the Colegio-Seminario de San Carlos in Cebu before moving to the Colegio de San Juan de Letran where he graduated in 1903, with the designation sobresaliente (excellent). Singson then studied law at the University of Santo Tomas and in 1909 was admitted to the Philippine Bar. He thereafter worked as a lawyer in his native Samar and Leyte.

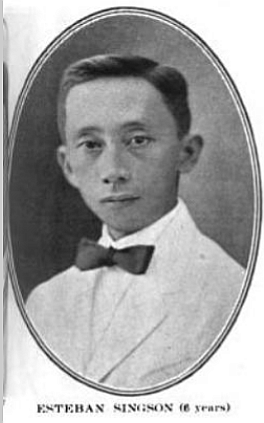
Singson depicted in a publication of the Philippine Education, published April 1917

In the 1916 elections, Singson won a six-year term in the newly established Senate of the Philippines after receiving the most votes in the 9th senatorial district composed of Leyte and Samar. He served until 1922.
