= Philippines's 9th senatorial district =

- Former constituency for the Senate of the Philippines
- Provinces / Cities: Leyte, Samar
- Population: 1,314,183 (1935)
- Electorate: 147,381 (1935)

Former constituency
- Created: 1916
- Abolished: 1934

Philippines's 9th senatorial district, officially the Ninth Senatorial District of the Philippine Islands (Spanish: Noveno Distrito Senatorial de las Islas Filipinas), was one of the twelve senatorial districts of the Philippines in existence between 1916 and 1935. It elected two members to the Senate of the Philippines, the upper chamber of the bicameral Philippine Legislature under the Insular Government of the Philippine Islands for each of the 4th to 10th legislatures. The district was created under the 1916 Jones Law from the eastern Visayas provinces of Leyte and Samar.

The district was represented by a total of six senators throughout its existence. It was abolished in 1935 when a unicameral National Assembly was installed under a new constitution following the passage of the Tydings–McDuffie Act which established the Commonwealth of the Philippines. Since the 1941 elections when the Senate was restored after a constitutional plebiscite, all twenty-four members of the upper house have been elected countrywide at-large. It was last represented by José María Veloso and José Avelino of the Nacionalista Democrático.

== List of senators ==
Seat A							Legislature	Seat B						
#	Image	Senator	Term of office		Party	Electoral history	Legislature	#	Image	Senator	Term of office		Party	Electoral history
#	Image	Senator	Start	End	Party	Electoral history	Legislature	#	Image	Senator	Start	End	Party	Electoral history
1		Esteban Singson	October 16, 1916	June 6, 1922	Nacionalista	Elected in 1916.	4th	1		José María Veloso	October 16, 1916	June 3, 1919	Nacionalista	Elected in 1916.
1		Esteban Singson	October 16, 1916	June 6, 1922	Nacionalista	Elected in 1916.	5th	2		Francisco Enage	June 3, 1919	June 2, 1925	Nacionalista	Elected in 1919.
2		Tomás Gómez	June 6, 1922	July 28, 1926	Nacionalista; Colectivista	Elected in 1922. Died.	6th	2		Francisco Enage	June 3, 1919	June 2, 1925	Nacionalista; Colectivista	Elected in 1919.
2		Tomás Gómez	June 6, 1922	July 28, 1926	Nacionalista; Consolidado	Elected in 1922. Died.	7th	(1)		José María Veloso	June 2, 1925	September 16, 1935	Demócrata	Elected in 1925.
3		Pastor Salazar	December 30, 1926	June 5, 1928	Nacionalista; Consolidado	Elected in 1926 to finish Gómez's term.	7th	(1)		José María Veloso	June 2, 1925	September 16, 1935	Demócrata	Elected in 1925.
4		José Avelino	June 5, 1928	September 16, 1935	Demócrata	Elected in 1928.	8th	(1)		José María Veloso	June 2, 1925	September 16, 1935	Demócrata	Elected in 1925.
4		José Avelino	June 5, 1928	September 16, 1935	Demócrata	Elected in 1928.	9th	(1)		José María Veloso	June 2, 1925	September 16, 1935	Demócrata	Re-elected in 1931.
4		José Avelino	June 5, 1928	September 16, 1935	Nacionalista; Democrático	Re-elected in 1934.	10th	(1)		José María Veloso	June 2, 1925	September 16, 1935	Nacionalista; Democrático	Re-elected in 1931.

== See also ==
- Senatorial districts of the Philippines
