= Datu Sinsuat Balabaran =

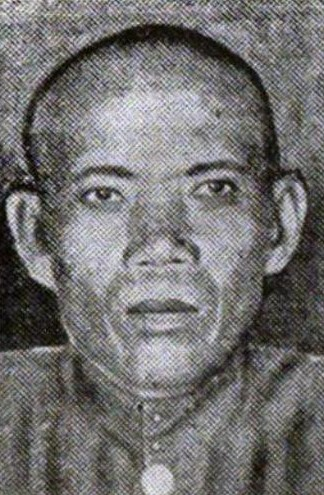
- Senatorial portrait of Datu Sinsuat, published by Benipayo Press, c. 1935

Senator of the Philippines from the 12th District
- In office 5 June 1934 – 16 September 1935 Serving with Juan Gaerlan
- Appointed by: Frank Murphy
- Preceded by: Jamalul Kiram II
- Succeeded by: Office abolished

Member of the National Assembly from Cotabato's Lone District
- In office September 16, 1935 – December 30, 1938
- Preceded by: District established
- Succeeded by: Ugalingan Piang

Personal details
- Born: 1864
- Died: 1949 (aged 84–85)
- Party: Nacionalista

Datu Sinsuat Balabaran (1864–1949) was a Filipino politician who was one of the earliest Muslim Filipino figures in national politics.

== Early life ==
Little is known about the exact details of Datu Sinsuat’s early life. He was born in 1864 and his father was Datu Balabaran, a member of a Cotabato family in the Sultanate of Maguindanao whose members included his uncle, Datu Ayunan, who bestowed upon Datu Balabaran the title of gobernadorcillo del delta (petty governor of the delta) [referring to the Rio Grande de Mindanao, which was in turn conferred on Ayunan by the Spanish for supporting them.

Sinsuat's official biography states that as a boy he was adopted by the prominent Maguindanaon leader Datu Piang and that as a young man he served as a delegate of the Spanish Military Governor. During the American occupation, he was appointed municipal district president of Dinaig in 1916. From 1923 to 1931 he served as special adviser to the Governor of Cotabato. During this time, he was able to improve his political and social standing through close cooperation with colonial authorities, strategically matching his heirs with other prominent families, amassing agricultural estates and earnings from traditional sources of revenues for datus.

== Senate ==
Sinsuat was appointed in 1934 by Governor-General Frank Murphy to the Philippine Senate as a 12th Senatorial District representing the non-Christian majority provinces of the Cordilleras and Mindanao until the abolition of the chamber in 1935. As the first datu to develop considerable political connections at the national level, his appointment to the position was credited to his acquaintance with Senate President Manuel L. Quezon.

== Family ==
Several of Sinsuat's relatives and descendants became politicians in their own right, holding positions in Cotabato City, Cotabato Province and in Maguindanao.
