= Mamerto Natividad =

Filipino military leader (1871–1897)

General Mamerto Natividad y Alejandrino
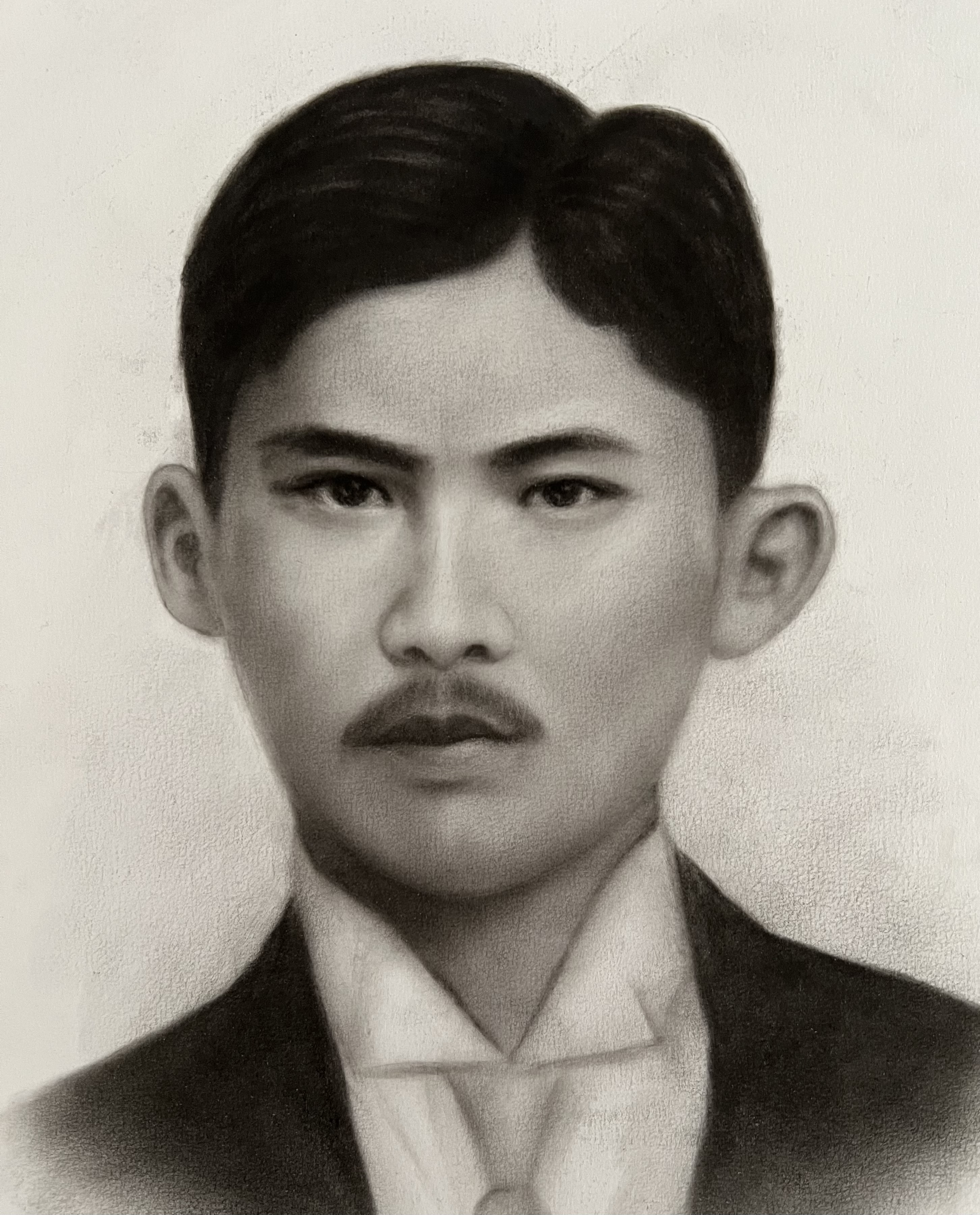
- Born: Mamerto Natividad y Alejandrino; June 12, 1871; Bacolor, Pampanga, Captaincy General of the Philippines
- Died: November 9, 1897 (aged 26); Entablado, Cabiao, Nueva Ecija, Captaincy General of the Philippines
- Burial place: Biak-Na-Bato, Bulacan
- Spouse: Trinidad Tinio (m. 1893)
- Relatives: Gen. Jose Salvador Natividad (brother); Gen. Benito Natividad (brother)
- Military career
- Allegiance: Republic of Biak-na-Bato; Katipunan (Magdalo)
- Rank: Commanding General Of Central Luzon
- Conflicts: Philippine Revolution: Battle of Aliaga

General Mamerto Natividad y Alejandrino (June 12, 1871 – November 9, 1897) was a haciendero and a Filipino military leader who led numerous successful battles during the Philippine Revolution against the Spaniards. He is credited with establishing army headquarters at Biak Na Bato, which today is a national park because of its historical significance. Together with Jose Clemente Zulueta, he wrote the proclamation entitled “To The Brave Sons of the Philippines”, which called for the expulsion of the friars from the Philippines. He was a signatory to the Biak Na Bato convention, but a steadfast dissenter to the Treaty of Biak Na Bato, which asked for peace and reforms. He preferred independence.

== Early life ==
General Mamerto Natividad was born on June 12, 1871, in Bacolor, Pampanga. He was the eldest of 12 children of Mamerto Santos Natividad Sr., a lawyer and eventually the first Martyr of Nueva Ecija, and Gervasia Alejandrino. He came from a prosperous family that owned haciendas in Pampanga and Nueva Ecija. At age 13, he was already supervising his father's farms in San Vicente and San Carlos in Cabiao, Nueva Ecija.

At age six, Mamerto was sent to study in Manila in the school of Jose Flores in Binondo and later at Ateneo Municipal de Manila and Colegio de San Juan de Letran, Department of Commerce. He was one of the student leaders when a strike threatened to divide the college into regional camps. Headstrong and impulsive, he did not finish his second year, but instead returned to Nueva Ecija to help manage his family's landholdings.

He was known to have fired a gun at a Spanish judge who slapped his younger brother for not paying the judge the respect he thought was due him. He was incarcerated, but later escaped. He tried to kill a Spaniard who harassed the Natividads in their hacienda in Sapang, Jaen. He fired at the Spaniard but the shot did not kill him.

On December 2, 1893, he married Trinidad Tinio, daughter of Don Casimiro Tinio or Capitan Berong of Aliaga, Nueva Ecija. Their union produced two daughters who died young, one at two years and seven months and the other only a week old.

The couple started farming in a barrio back then known as Likab (presently Quezon) and then moved to Jaen where they farmed for another year. Mamerto was directing tenants in Matamo, Arayat, Pampanga a year later.

They traveled to Manila for medical treatment after Trinidad miscarried. The revolution broke out in August 1896 and nine provinces were in arms. Upon learning that Cabiao was among the rebel towns, the couple immediately packed their things and returned home to join the revolution, sending Mamerto's younger brother, Benito, ahead.

== Revolutionary period ==
Mamerto and Trinidad traveled to Matamo to elude arrest. Three days later, his mother arrived, informing them that their father, Mamerto Natividad Sr., had been executed by Spanish authorities on September 26, 1896, in San Isidro, together with attorney Marcos Ventus. Mamerto Natividad Sr. had been recently initiated into the Katipunan. He was arrested for sedition, tortured and killed.

This fueled Mamerto's anger towards the Spaniards. He left for the battlefield.

On October 31, 1896, Mamerto was captured in Aliaga, brought to Manila and incarcerated in Bilibid after being mistaken for his father who had the same name but had already been executed.

When he was freed, he and his brothers – Benito, Jose, Joaquin, Francisco and Pedro Manuel – joined the Philippine rebellion against the Spanish authorities to avenge their father's death. The Spaniards retaliated by torching their beautiful house and their sugar mills at Jaen, Nueva Ecija. They left for Cavite and became the house guests of Baldomero Aguinaldo in Binakayan, and joined the Katipunan.

Within the Katipunan, Natividad was part of the Magdalo faction. He advised General Emilio Aguinaldo to settle and put an end to the Magdalo-Magdiwang rivalry. (Andres Bonifacio was part of the Magdiwang faction.) In his book, Revolt of the Masses, Teodoro Agoncillo mentions that Gen. Mamerto Natividad, together with the eminent historian and poet, Jose Clemente Zulueta and Sr. Anastacio Francisco detested and convinced General Aguinaldo to reverse his pardon for the Bonifacio brothers. "These men sang the same chorus, to wit, that the Bonifacio brothers must be liquidated in the interest of the Revolution since it had been made clear that Andres was intent upon having General Aguinaldo murdered and taking the highest position for himself. Under such powerful pressure, General Aguinaldo withdrew his pardon."

Natividad fought against the Spaniards in several battles. He once chided his wife, Trinidad, for preventing his presence in the battle of Zapote and assured her that Edilberto Evangelista would not have fallen were he with him. He fought in the battles of Pintong Bato in Imus, Cavite (his brother Benito was wounded there), San Rafael and Baliwag, Bulacan. He conducted raids in Carmen, Zaragoza, Peñaranda, Santor (now Bongabon), Aliaga and Carranglan in Nueva Ecija.

Brave beyond the call of duty, on June 6, 1897, he was named Lieutenant General for Central Luzon by the Assembly of Puray in Montalban. The appointment was later approved by General Aguinaldo on June 18. He was the youngest general at that time.

With the revolutionaries overwhelmed in Cavite, Natividad was commissioned to look for a place of retreat. He found Biak-Na-Bato, set it up as the revolutionary headquarters and actively engaged in procuring provisions. When Aguinaldo evacuated Cavite in June 1897, he proceeded to Biak-Na-Bato. There he issued a proclamation drafted for him by Jose Clemente Zulueta and Natividad, his second in command. The proclamation was entitled “To The Brave Sons of the Philippines”. It called for the expulsion of the friars, return of land to Filipinos, freedom of press, religious tolerance and legal equality. The tenth paragraph describes the aspirations of the Philippine Revolution:

Mindful of the common good, we aspire to the glory of obtaining liberty, independence and honor for the country. We aspire to have common law, created for all citizens, which will serve them as a guarantee and assurance of respect, without exception. We aspire to have a government which will represent all the active forces of the country, in which will take part the most capable, the most worthy in virtues and talents, without regard to their birth, their wealth, or the face to which they belong. We desire that no friar shall set his foot on any part of the Archipelago, and that no convent or monastery or center of corruption, or partisans of that theocracy which has made this land another inquisitorial Spain, shall remain. In our ranks order shall always be respected.

During August 5–7, 1897, Natividad's troops, together with those of Melecio Carlos, overwhelmed the Spaniards in San Rafael, Bulacan. The battle left six revolutionaries dead, while the Spaniards had 50 casualties.

Using Baliuag river, Natividad and his men held back enemy reinforcements. He and his men sank three merchant vessels full of Spanish Cazadores coming from Angat and Bustos. They were drowned in the strong current. The rebels had to use five carretones to gather and transport the Spanish dead and wounded. Natividad's forces fought on for two more days, inflicting more casualties on the Spaniards, before retreating to the mountains with captured arms and ammunition.

On August 30, 1897, Natividad came to the aid of the people of Santor, Bongabon, Nueva Ecija who had risen in arms against the Spaniards. He occupied it and left on September 3.

On September 4, 1897, with 80 men in town, he personally directed the assault on Aliaga town with General Manuel Tinio and his forces against the 8,000 men of General Primo de Rivera. After three days of fighting, the Spanish forces had to surrender, even after receiving reinforcements from Zaragoza town under the commands of Generals Monet and Nuñez on September 6. Nuñez was seriously wounded in the battle.

On October 9, Natividad led a rebel force to Karanglan, Nueva Ecija and fought a column led by Commandant Navarro, inflicting considerable casualties. He captured a Spanish detachment that included the friar Gomez in Baler, district of Principe. He also led an attack in Tayug, Pangasinan.

For bravery, Natividad was appointed Chief Commanding General of Central Luzon after the reorganization of the revolutionary government in Biak-na-Bato.

== Pact of Biak-Na-Bato ==
General Natividad was among those who signed the Constitution of Biak-Na-Bato, which was adopted on November 1, 1897. However, he opposed the Pact or Treaty of Biak-na-Bato, which called for the cessation of war and the declaration of peace on the basis of amnesty and reforms.

Pedro Paterno unsuccessfully tried to change Natividad's mind, recalling how his family suffered under Spanish rule. Natividad told Paterno that he was wasting his time, since he had already decided to fight the Spaniards to the end to attain independence. He also doubted that the Spanish government would live up to its part of the Treaty, which included expulsion of the Spanish friars from the Philippines and questioned Paterno's motives.

His wife recalled the time when Natividad's brother, wanting to go home and marry soon, attempted to influence his brother Mamerto to accept the peace proposals. The latter threatened to shoot him if he persisted in his efforts.

Had Natividad not just then died, the Treaty of Biak-na-Bato would not have been consummated, at least not with the same conditions and date, changing the course of Philippine history. In his book, General Jose Alejandrino stated that "the major obstacle which Paterno encountered in his negotiations was the opposition of that unconquerable leader and he succeeded in his objective only after Natividad was dead."

== Death ==
On November 9, 1897, Natividad led an ambuscade in Entablado, Cabiao, Nueva Ecija. His force of 36 men was divided amongst his brothers Jose Salvador, Benito and himself, each one scarcely having 12 men. This group faced 200 cazadores. As the Spanish soldiers were retreating, he peered through his field glass to view their movement when he was shot and killed by a Spanish sniper through the right eyebrow. In his article, his younger brother, then Ex-Lt. Colonel Joaquin Natividad writes, "The Spaniard was quickly killed but his death could not off-set the loss of General Natividad. Even at the point of death, the gallant patriot tried to do a good turn for a comrade-in-arms. With almost his last breath, he instructed his two brothers, Jose (Salvador) and Benito, to ask Don Emilio (Aguinaldo), in his name, for the release of Isidro Torres who was at the time under arrest." General Torres was the commander of the "Apuy" guerillas and was incarcerated because he refused to sacrifice his men in a hopeless frontal attack against the enemy in a fortified position.

Natividad was carried by his comrades and his brothers in a hammock but he died in Daang Kawayan on the way to Biak-Na-Bato at about 6 o'clock at dusk.

"At the first opportunity, the brothers of the slain General Natividad told General Aguinaldo of his last wish. Aguinaldo sent at once for General Torres and embraced him in the presence of everybody." General Natividad's dying wish was granted and General Isidro Torres continued fighting against the Spaniards and then the Americans until the Philippines surrendered.

Natividad was buried with military honors in the bank of a river that flowed near Biak-na-Bato and a period of mourning was declared. Eulogies were given by President Aguinaldo and Pedro Paterno. Aguinaldo declared that "Nobody may forget the 9th of November because on this day two great patriots lost their lives for the freedom of our mother country" referring to Natividad and Candido Tria Tirona.

His family later tried to recover his remains, but the changing path of the river had scattered his remains.

After his death, the Treaty of Biak-na-Bato was signed. Spanish authorities exiled the revolutionary leaders to Hong Kong, including Natividad's brother Benito and Jose Salvador.

President Aguinaldo paid tribute to Natividad in his message at the opening of the Malolos Congress at the Barasoain Church in Malolos, Bulacan on September 15, 1898. He was greatly mourned by Aguinaldo, who considered him a real brother-in-arms and his right-hand man.

== Legacy ==
As a military leader, he was a strict disciplinarian. "The personal mark of the character of that national hero was the calmness and prudence with which he proceeded before making his determination, but once he made up his mind, he executed his resolutions with an admirable determination, boldness and perseverance."

His brothers continued to fight against the Spaniards and later against the Americans. Benito and Salvador rose to the rank of general, Joaquin became a Colonel while Francisco and Pedro were lieutenants. The Natividads were known as the family of generals.

Biak Na Bato, the headquarters established by Natividad for the Philippine Revolutionary Army was declared a national park in 1937 by President Manuel L. Quezon by virtue of its association with the history and site of the Biak-na-Bato Republic.

The municipality of General Mamerto Natividad in Nueva Ecija, the barangays Natividad North and Natividad South in Cabiao, and the streets of General Natividad (Taguig) and Natividad (Pasay) are named in his honor.
