= Jose Maria Veloso =

Filipino legislator from Leyte (1886–1969)

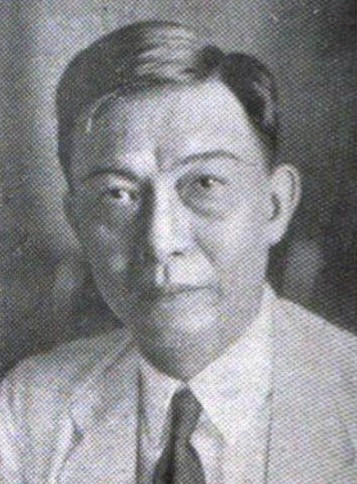
- Senatorial portrait of Veloso, published by Benipayo Press, c. 1935

Senator of the Philippines for the 9th District
- In office June 2, 1925 – September 16, 1935; Served with: Tomas Gomez (1925–1926); Pastor Salazar (1926–1928); José Avelino (1928–1935)
- Preceded by: Francisco Enage
- Succeeded by: Position abolished
- In office October 16, 1916 – June 3, 1919; Served with: Esteban Singson
- Preceded by: Position established
- Succeeded by: Francisco Enage

Member of the House of Representatives from Leyte
- In office June 11, 1945 – May 25, 1946
- Preceded by: Atilano Cinco (as assemblyman)
- Succeeded by: Atilano Cinco
- Constituency: 5th district
- In office June 6, 1922 – June 2, 1925
- Preceded by: Julio Siayngco
- Succeeded by: Ruperto Kapunan
- Constituency: 3rd district

Member of the National Assembly from Leyte's at-large district
- In office September 25, 1943 – February 2, 1944 Serving with Bernardo Torres

Member of the National Assembly of the Philippines from Leyte's 1st district
- In office September 16, 1935 – December 30, 1938
- Preceded by: Carlos Tan (as representative)
- Succeeded by: Carlos Tan

Governor of Leyte
- In office 1919–1922
- Preceded by: Eugenio Jaro
- In office 1912–1916
- Preceded by: Pastor Navarro
- Succeeded by: Julian de Veyra

Personal details
- Born: José María Veloso y Bismorte; April 30, 1886 San Isidro, Leyte, Captaincy General of the Philippines
- Died: April 13, 1969 (aged 82)
- Party: Nacionalista Party
- Other political affiliations: KALIBAPI; Democrata Party
- Spouses: Consuelo Felix; Fructuosa Atillo
- Children: 5
- Parents: Manuel Veloso; Casiana Bismorte
- Education: University of San Carlos; University of Santo Tomas

Jose Maria Bismorte Veloso (born José María Veloso y Bismorte; April 30, 1886 – April 13, 1969) was a Filipino lawyer, politician and legislator.

== Early life and education ==
The son of Manuel Rubi Veloso and Casiana Bismorte and educated at Cebu's Seminary College in 1903, he proceeded to take up law at the University of Santo Tomas, became a lawyer in 1909 in the same year he graduated from the university, and in the next year, established a law firm called Veloso and Singson.

== Political career ==
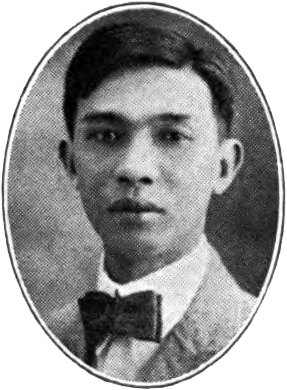
Veloso as member of the Philippine House of Representatives, c. 1923

During the 1912 provincial election in Leyte, he defeated former governor Pastor Navarro. Navarro protested the result of Veloso's electoral victory but was dismissed. From 1912 to 1922, he was the governor of Leyte, although he relinquished the position on his second term to serve as senator from the 9th district from 1916 to 1919. As a senator, he was the chairperson of the Senate Committee on Commerce and Communication. He was also elected as representative of Leyte's 3rd district from 1922 to 1925 and the 5th district from 1935 to 1938 as an assemblyman and from 1945 to 1946 as a post-Commonwealth representative. He was also elected senator from the country's 9th district from 1916 to 1919 and from 1925 to 1935.

== Personal life ==
His daughter Concepcion, was married to Eduardo Romualdez.

His family later on became one of the oldest political dynasties in the country and oldest in Leyte, pre-dating that of the Romualdezes whose descendants include Imelda Marcos.
