= Philippines's 12th senatorial district =

- Former constituency for the Senate of the Philippines
- Provinces / Cities: Agusan, Baguio, Bukidnon, Cotabato, Davao, Lanao, Mountain Province, Nueva Vizcaya, Sulu, Zamboanga
- Population: 1,515,617 (1935)
- Electorate: 78,966 (1935)

Former constituency
- Created: 1916
- Abolished: 1934

Philippines's 12th senatorial district, officially the Twelfth Senatorial District of the Philippine Islands (Spanish: Duodécimo Distrito Senatorial de las Islas Filipinas), was one of the twelve senatorial districts of the Philippines in existence between 1916 and 1935. Unlike the first eleven districts which elected two members each to the Senate of the Philippines, the upper chamber of the bicameral Philippine Legislature under the Insular Government of the Philippine Islands, the two senators from this district were appointed by the Governor-General of the Philippines to serve indefinite terms in the 4th to 10th legislatures. The district was created under the 1916 Jones Law to represent the non-Christian tribes of the northern Luzon provinces of Mountain Province and Nueva Vizcaya, the city of Baguio, and the Moro people and other non-Christian tribes of the Department of Mindanao and Sulu provinces of Agusan, Bukidnon, Cotabato, Davao, Lanao, Sulu and Zamboanga.

The district was represented by a total of ten senators throughout its existence. It was abolished in 1935 when a unicameral National Assembly was installed under a new constitution following the passage of the Tydings–McDuffie Act which established the Commonwealth of the Philippines. Since the 1941 elections when the Senate was restored after a constitutional plebiscite, all twenty-four members of the upper house have been elected countrywide at-large. It was last represented by Datu Balabaran Sinsuat of the Nacionalista Demócrata Pro-Independencia and Juan Gaerlan of the Nacionalista Democrático.

== List of senators ==
Seat A							Legislature	Seat B						
#	Image	Senator	Term of office		Party	Electoral history	Legislature	#	Image	Senator	Term of office		Party	Electoral history
#	Image	Senator	Start	End	Party	Electoral history	Legislature	#	Image	Senator	Start	End	Party	Electoral history
1		Hadji Butu	October 16, 1916	November 15, 1920	Nacionalista	Appointed. Resigned.	4th	1		Joaquín Luna	October 16, 1916	July 1, 1920	Nacionalista	Appointed. Resigned on appointment as Mountain Province governor.
1		Hadji Butu	October 16, 1916	November 15, 1920	Nacionalista	Appointed. Resigned.	5th	1		Joaquín Luna	October 16, 1916	July 1, 1920	Nacionalista	Appointed. Resigned on appointment as Mountain Province governor.
2		Teófisto Guingona Sr.	November 15, 1920	November 13, 1923	Progresista	Appointed. Resigned.	5th	2		Lope K. Santos	July 1, 1920	November 15, 1921	Nacionalista	Appointed. Resigned.
2		Teófisto Guingona Sr.	November 15, 1920	November 13, 1923	Demócrata	Appointed. Resigned.	6th	3		Hadji Butu	June 6, 1922	June 2, 1931	Demócrata	Appointed.
3		José Alejandrino	November 13, 1923	July 14, 1928	Demócrata	Appointed.	6th	3		Hadji Butu	June 6, 1922	June 2, 1931	Demócrata	Appointed.
3		José Alejandrino	November 13, 1923	July 14, 1928	Demócrata	Appointed.	7th	3		Hadji Butu	June 6, 1922	June 2, 1931	Demócrata	Appointed.
3		José Alejandrino	November 13, 1923	July 14, 1928	Demócrata	Appointed.	8th	3		Hadji Butu	June 6, 1922	June 2, 1931	Demócrata	Re-appointed.
4		Manuel Camus	July 14, 1928	June 2, 1931	Nacionalista; Consolidado	Appointed.	8th	3		Hadji Butu	June 6, 1922	June 2, 1931	Demócrata	Re-appointed.
5		Jamalul Kiram II	June 2, 1931	June 5, 1934	Independent	Appointed.	9th	4		Ludovico Hidrosollo	June 2, 1931	June 5, 1934	Nacionalista; Consolidado	Appointed.
6		Datu Sinsuat Balabaran	June 5, 1934	September 16, 1935	Nacionalista; Demócrata Pro-Independencia	Appointed.	10th	5		Juan Gaerlan	June 5, 1934	September 16, 1935	Nacionalista; Democrático	Appointed.

== See also ==
- Senatorial districts of the Philippines
