= Senatorial districts of the Philippines =

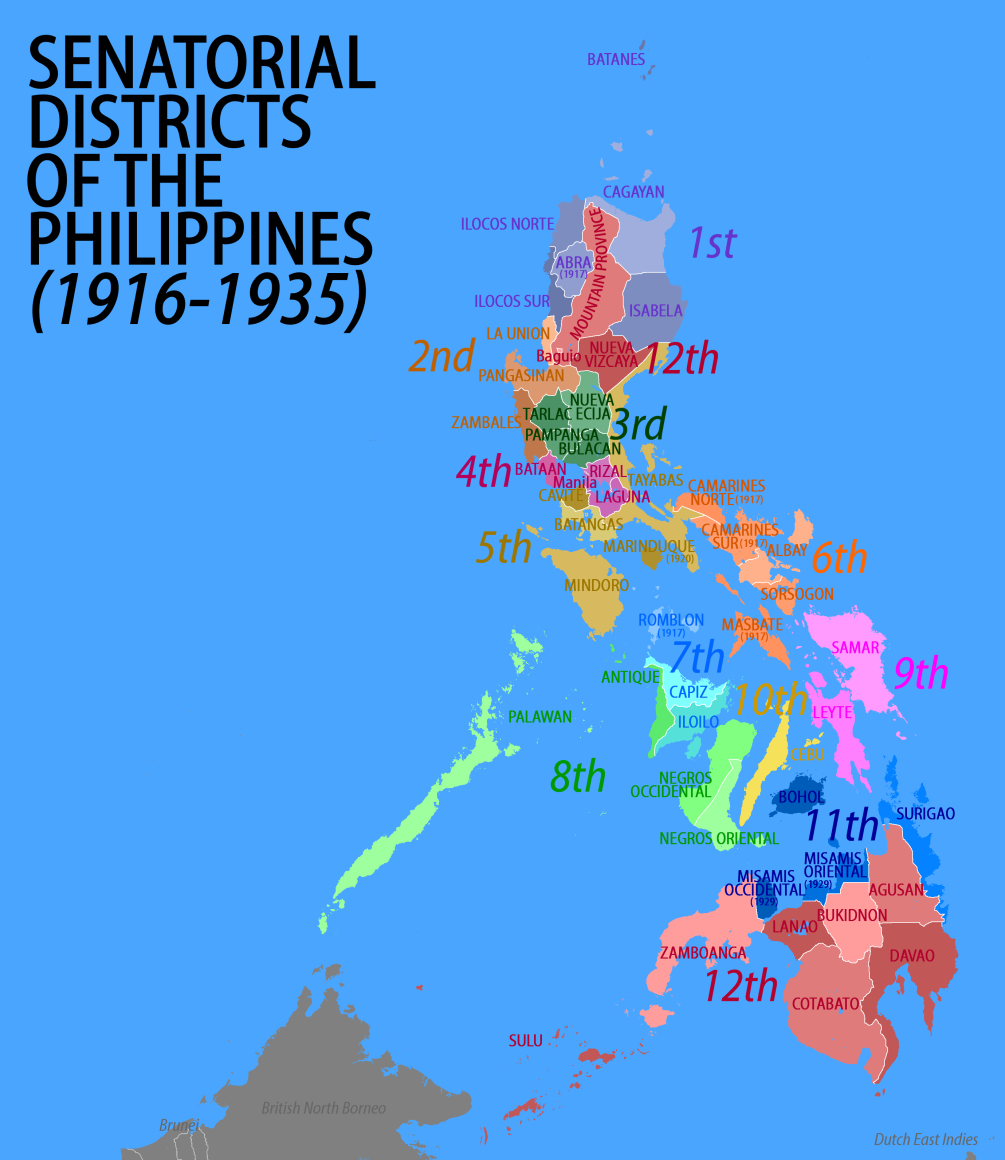
Senatorial districts

The senatorial districts of the Philippines were the representations of the provinces of the Philippines in the Philippine Senate from 1916 to 1935.

== History ==
The enactment of the Philippine Autonomy Act (popularly known as "Jones Law") in August 1916 by the United States Congress provided for the creation of a bicameral legislature consisting of a lower chamber (House of Representatives) and an upper chamber (Senate). Until then the Philippine Commission held the executive power and some legislative powers over the American colony.

The system of government of the Philippines in its early years of transition to democratic self-government was deliberately structured to emulate the American model. The Philippines thus followed the American system of electing the members of the 24-seat senate by district.

The districts were organized and numbered in a roughly north–south fashion, much like the present administrative regions. The first eleven districts were composed of established provinces, while the twelfth was composed of the provinces of the Luzon interior and much of Mindanao – both of which were never fully administered by the old Spanish colonial government and designated by American authorities as "non-Christian" areas.

The first to eleventh districts elected two senators each by popular vote. The two senators from the twelfth district were appointed by the U.S. governor-general. The setup lasted until the establishment of the Commonwealth of the Philippines in 1935, when the bicameral legislature was abolished, as the 1935 Constitution provided only for a unicameral National Assembly. However, when the Constitution was amended in 1940 to re-establish a bicameral Congress, members of the Senate had to be voted at-large, thereby effectively abolishing the district system.

== List ==
District	Provinces/Cities	Electorate (1935)	Population (1935)	Area (km^{2})	Senators (1934–1935)			
District	Provinces/Cities	Electorate (1935)	Population (1935)	Area (km^{2})	Seat A	Party	Seat B	Party
1st	Abra, Batanes, Cagayan, Ilocos Norte, Ilocos Sur, Isabela	159,411	992,845	32,158.83	Melecio Arranz	Nacionalista Democratico	Elpidio Quirino	Nacionalista Democratico
2nd	La Union, Pangasinan, Zambales	176,535	997,314	10,779.54	Teófilo Sison	Nacionalista Democratico	Alejo Mabanag	Nacionalista Democrata Pro-Independencia
3rd	Bulacan, Nueva Ecija, Pampanga, Tarlac	221,199	1,102,990	13,710.52	Hermogenes Concepción	Nacionalista Democrata Pro-Independencia	Sotero Baluyut	Nacionalista Democratico
4th	Bataan, Laguna, Manila, Rizal	241,389	982,720	5,055.32	Juan Sumulong	Nacionalista Democratico	Juan Nolasco	Nacionalista Democratico
5th	Batangas, Cavite, Marinduque, Mindoro, Tayabas	203,936	1,048,422	27,819.40	Manuel L. Quezon	Nacionalista Democratico	Claro M. Recto	Nacionalista Democratico
6th	Albay, Camarines Norte, Camarines Sur, Masbate, Sorsogon	166,745	1,046,267	18,155.82	Domingo Imperial	Nacionalista Democratico	José O. Vera	Nacionalista Democrata Pro-Independencia
7th	Capiz, Iloilo, Romblon	145,571	1,033,570	11,633.25	Potenciano Treñas	Nacionalista Democrata Pro-Independencia	Ruperto Montinola	Nacionalista Democrata Pro-Independencia
8th	Antique, Negros Occidental, Negros Oriental, Palawan	153,706	1,124,197	33,448.15	Isaac Lacson	Nacionalista Democratico	Gil Montilla	Nacionalista Democratico
9th	Leyte, Samar	147,381	1,314,183	23,251.10	José Avelino	Nacionalista Democratico	José María Veloso	Nacionalista Democratico
10th	Cebu	116,613	1,064,880	5,351.69	Sergio Osmeña	Nacionalista Democrata Pro-Independencia	Manuel Briones	Nacionalista Democrata Pro-Independencia
11th	Bohol, Misamis Occidental, Misamis Oriental, Surigao	124,520	876,400	18,600.41	José Clarín	Nacionalista Democratico	Juan Torralba	Nacionalista Democratico
12th	Agusan, Baguio, Bukidnon, Cotabato, Davao, Lanao, Mountain Province, Nueva Vizcaya, Sulu, Zamboanga	78,966	1,515,617	100,035.97	Datu Sinsuat Balabaran	Nacionalista Democrata Pro-Independencia	Juan Gaerlan	Nacionalista Democratico

== See also ==
- Congressional districts of the Philippines
- Lists of electoral districts by nation
