= Juan Gaerlan =

Filipino politician and senator (1884-1944)

The Honourable Juan Gaerlan
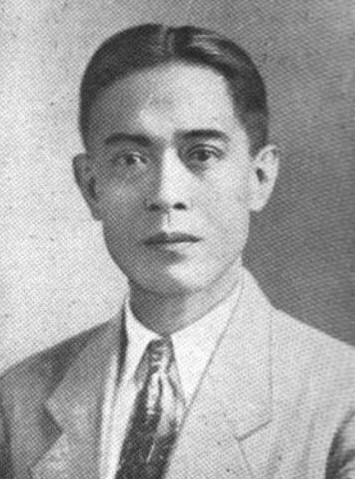
- Senatorial portrait of Gaerlan, published by Benipayo Press, c. 1935

Senator of the Philippines from the 12th District
- In office June 5, 1934 – September 16, 1935 Serving with Datu Sinsuat Balabaran
- Appointed by: Frank Murphy
- Preceded by: Ludovico Hidrosollo
- Succeeded by: Office abolished

Member of the House of Representatives from Mountain Province's Lone District
- In office June 5, 1931 – June 5, 1934 Serving with Hilary Clapp and Henry Kamora
- Preceded by: Juan Cailles
- Succeeded by: Felix Diaz

Deputy Governor of Benguet
- In office 1918–1922
- Preceded by: Juan Cariño Oraá
- Succeeded by: Tomas Blanco

Deputy Governor of Apayao and Benguet
- Acting
- In office 1921–1922

Deputy Governor of Mountain Province
- In office 1920–1921

Personal details
- Born: July 7, 1884 Tagudin, Ilocos Sur, Captaincy General of the Philippines
- Died: July 9, 1944 (aged 60) City of Greater Manila, Philippine Commonwealth
- Party: Nacionalista (from 1934)
- Other political affiliations: Independent (until 1934)

Juan Gualberto Gaerlan y Lorenzana (July 7, 1884 – July 9, 1944) was a Filipino politician who became Senator of the Philippines during the American occupation.

== Early life ==
Gaerlan was born in Tagudin, Ilocos Sur, on July 7, 1884, to Sabas Gaerlan and Rosalina Lorenza.

== Political career ==
Gaerlan held several administrative positions in Bontoc before becoming deputy governor of Benguet, then a subprovince of Mountain Province, from 1918 to 1922. He was the second Filipino to hold such position. He subsequently became the deputy governor of Mountain Province from 1920 to 1921 and the acting deputy governor of Apayao and Benguet subprovinces from 1921 to 1922.

He was appointed to the House of Representatives as a delegate for the Mountain Province from 1931 to 1934, after which he was appointed by Governor-General Frank Murphy to become a Senator from the 12th Senatorial District representing the non-Christian majority provinces of the Cordilleras, Nueva Vizcaya, and Mindanao from 1934 to 1935.
