= Francisco Enage =

Filipino politician

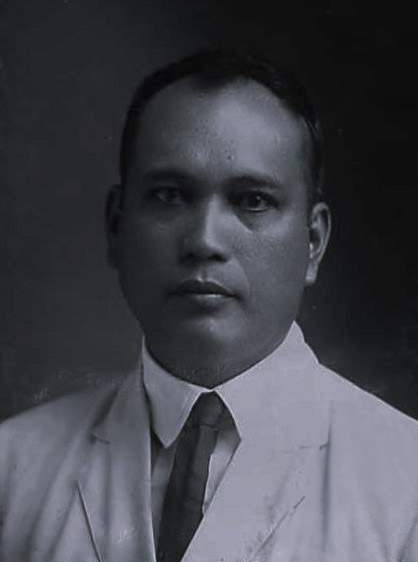
- Enage in 1922

Senator of the Philippines from the 9th District
- In office June 3, 1919 – June 2, 1925 Serving with Tomas Gomez
- Preceded by: Jose Maria Veloso
- Succeeded by: Jose Maria Veloso

Senate Majority Leader
- In office June 3, 1919 – June 2, 1925
- Preceded by: Francisco Felipe Villanueva
- Succeeded by: Jose P. Laurel

Member of the National Assembly from Leyte's 4th district
- In office September 16, 1935 – September 1, 1936
- Preceded by: Fortunato Sevilla
- Succeeded by: Norberto Romualdez

Member of the Philippine Assembly from Leyte's 4th district
- In office October 16, 1912 – February 5, 1915
- Preceded by: Jaime C. de Veyra
- Succeeded by: Ruperto Kapunan

Governor of Leyte
- In office 1908–1909
- Preceded by: Vicente Diaz
- Succeeded by: Pastor Navarro

Personal details
- Born: October 4, 1878 Tacloban, Leyte, Captaincy General of the Philippines
- Died: January 12, 1959 (aged 80) Sampaloc, Manila, Philippines
- Party: Nacionalista
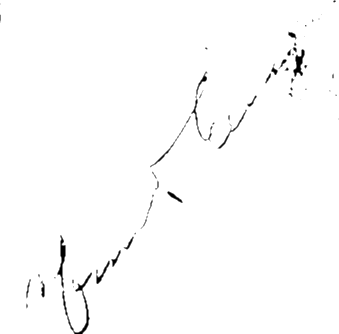
- Signature

Francisco Abella Enage (October 4, 1878 – January 12, 1959) was a Filipino politician.

== Early life ==
Franciso Enage was born in Tacloban, Leyte on October 4, 1878, to Emeterio Enaje and Cleofe Abella. He attended Colegio Seminario de San Carlos in Cebu and went to San Juan de Letran in Manila.

He served in the Philippine Revolutionary Army and was wounded during the Philippine-American War in 1900. As a revolutionary, Enage fought in the mountains of Perikohon, Burawen, Leyte.

In 1903, he was qualified to practice law before the Supreme Court and subsequently worked as a lawyer.

== Political career ==
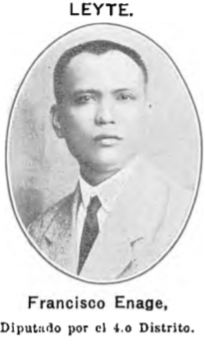
Enage as member of the Philippine Assembly, c. 1913

During the early part of the American occupation, Enage was elected as Municipal Councilor of Tacloban. He became Governor of Leyte from 1908 to 1909. As governor, Enage's administration built school buildings and roads, which obtained a donation for the province amounting to 80,000 pesos from the Insular Government. He was elected to the Philippine Assembly as a delegate for Leyte's 4th district from 1912 to 1915, and Senator for the 9th District comprising Leyte and Samar from 1919 to 1925. He also served in the judiciary as Provincial Fiscal and Provincial Prosecutor of Iloilo, an Executive Secretary, and a judge.

He returned as a lawmaker, this time for the National Assembly, in 1935 as representative of the fourth district of Leyte, but to avoid a deadlock in the election of Speaker, for which he was a candidate, he resigned from the body to accept the position of Technical Adviser to President Manuel Quezon.
