= Tomas Gomez (Filipino politician) =

Filipino politician and physician

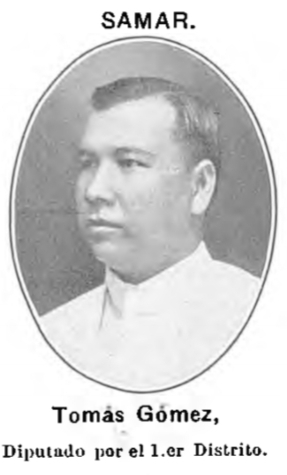
- Gomez as a member of the Philippine Assembly, c. 1913

Senator of the Philippines from the 9th district
- In office June 6, 1922 – July 28, 1926
- Preceded by: Esteban Singson
- Succeeded by: Pastor Salazar

Members of the Philippine House of Representatives from Samar's 1st district
- In office 1912–1916
- Preceded by: Vicente Obieta
- Succeeded by: Pedro Mendiola

Personal details
- Born: Tomas Gómez y Delantar; 1877 Polo, Bulacan, Captaincy General of the Philippines
- Died: July 28, 1926 (aged 48–49) Calbayog, Samar, Philippine Islands
- Party: Nacionalista
- Education: Colegio de San Juan de Letran
- Alma mater: University of Santo Tomas
- Profession: Physician

Tomas Gómez y Delantar (1877 – July 28, 1926) was a Filipino physician and politician. He was elected to the Senate of the Philippines in 1922 and died in office in 1926.

== Biography ==
=== Early life and education ===
Tomas Gomez was born in Polo, Bulacan (present-day Valenzuela, Metro Manila) in 1877. He studied in Colegio de San Juan de Letran and later studied medicine at the University of Santo Tomas, both in Manila. After completing his medical studies, he moved to Calbayog in the then-undivided Samar.

=== Political career ===
In the 1912 elections, Gomez was elected for the 1st district of Samar in the Philippine House of Representatives. He served for one term until 1916. In 1922, Gomez was elected to the Senate of the Philippines on behalf of the 9th district. However, he died on July 28, 1926, before the end of his term. In a special election, Pastor Salazar was elected to complete his unexpired term.
