= List of senators of the Philippines =

The Senate of the Philippines is the upper house of the Philippine Congress. The Senate is composed of 24 senators, each elected to a six-year term, renewable once, under plurality-at-large voting: on each election, the voters vote for up to twelve candidates, with the twelve candidates the highest number of votes being elected in.

Prior to 1916, the Philippine Assembly, from 1935 to 1941 the National Assembly, and from 1978 to 1986 the Batasang Pambansa (National Legislature) were the sole houses of the legislature. In periods where the legislature was bicameral, the upper house has always been called the "Senate." From 1972 to 1978 and from 1986 to 1987, the president possessed legislative powers.

As of June 2025, a total of 254 (Note: This number excludes the two individuals elected to the Senate for the first time but died before taking office (Daniel Maramba in 1941 and José Ozámiz in 1944).) officeholders have served in the Senate (including those currently serving).

A map illustrating the provinces represented by 1, 2, or more senators in the 5th Republic of the Philippines. Data based on known residence or province of origin by incumbent and former senators.

== List ==
Senators' terms are always for six years. The exceptions and details are:

- For those elected under the Jones Law, terms start on election day and end six years later.
  - In the first legislature, the candidate per district that places first shall serve for six years, and those who placed second shall serve three years.
  - A new constitution was ratified after the 10th Legislature, abolishing the Senate. Senators' terms ended once the 1935 constitution was put into effect on September 16, 1935.
- For those elected under the 1935 Constitution as amended, terms start on December 30 after their election and end December 30 six years later.
  - For those elected in 1941, the first Congress convened on July 4, 1945, or almost four years from when the winning candidates' terms started on December 30, 1941. As no senatorial elections were held from 1941 up to that time, it was decided by lot who shall serve until 1946 and who shall serve until 1947.
  - President Ferdinand Marcos declared martial law on September 23, 1972, while the Senate was in recess. He prevented Congress from convening again, and a new constitution approved in 1973 abolished the Senate.
- For those elected under the 1987 Constitution, terms start on June 30 after their election and end June 30 six years later.
  - For those elected in the first Congress after the ratification of the constitution, the senators served from June 30, 1987, to June 30, 1992.
  - For those elected in the second Congress after the ratification of the constitution, the senators that finished 1st to 12th in the 1992 election served from June 30, 1992, to June 30, 1998. Those who finished 13th to 24th served from June 30, 1992, to June 30, 1995.

=== A ===
Senator	District	Term	Legislature	Party	Electoral history	Notes
Esteban Abada	Nationwide at-large	December 30, 1949 – December 17, 1954	2nd–3rd Congress	Liberal	Elected in 1949	Died in office
Juan B. Alegre	6th	June 6, 1922 – June 6, 1928	6th–7th Legislatures	Nacionalista	Elected in 1922; Re-elected in 1925	
Jose Alejandrino	12th	November 13, 1923 – July 14, 1928	6th–8th Legislature	Democrata	Appointed in 1923	
Alejandro Almendras	Nationwide at-large	December 30, 1959 – September 23, 1972	4th–7th Congress	Nacionalista	Elected in 1959; Re-elected in 1965; Re-elected in 1971	Term expired upon declaration of martial law
Alauya Alonto	Nationwide at-large	December 30, 1941 – December 30, 1947	1st Commonwealth Congress–1st Congress	Nacionalista	Elected in 1941	Took office on July 4, 1945
Domocao Alonto	Nationwide at-large	December 30, 1955 – December 30, 1961	3rd–4th Congress	Nacionalista	Elected in 1955	
Jose Altavas	7th	October 3, 1916 – October 3, 1922	4th–5th Legislature	Nacionalista	Elected in 1916	
Heherson Alvarez	Nationwide at-large	June 30, 1987 – June 30, 1998	8th–10th Congress	UNIDO	Elected in 1987; Re-elected in 1992	
Heherson Alvarez	Nationwide at-large	June 30, 1987 – June 30, 1998	8th–10th Congress	LDP	Elected in 1987; Re-elected in 1992	
Edgardo Angara	Nationwide at-large	June 30, 1987 – June 30, 1998; June 30, 2001 – June 30, 2013	8th–10th, 12th–15th Congress	Independent	Elected in 1987; Re-elected in 1992; Elected in 2001; Re-elected in 2007	
Edgardo Angara	Nationwide at-large	June 30, 1987 – June 30, 1998; June 30, 2001 – June 30, 2013	8th–10th, 12th–15th Congress	LDP	Elected in 1987; Re-elected in 1992; Elected in 2001; Re-elected in 2007	
Sonny Angara	Nationwide at-large	June 30, 2013 – July 18, 2024	16th–19th Congress	LDP	Elected in 2013; Re-elected in 2019	Left office upon appointment as Secretary of Education
Pablo Ángeles David	Nationwide at-large	December 30, 1947 – December 30, 1953	1st–3rd Congress	Liberal	Elected in 1947	
Gaudencio Antonino	Nationwide at-large	December 30, 1961 – November 13, 1967	5th–6th Congress	Liberal	Elected in 1961	Died in office
Magnolia Antonino	Nationwide at-large	December 30, 1967 – September 23, 1972	6th–7th Congress	Independent	Elected in 1967	Term expired upon declaration of martial law
Agapito Aquino	Nationwide at-large	June 30, 1987 – June 30, 1995	8th–9th Congress	BANDILA	Elected in 1987; Re-elected in 1992	
Agapito Aquino	Nationwide at-large	June 30, 1987 – June 30, 1995	8th–9th Congress	LDP	Elected in 1987; Re-elected in 1992	
Bam Aquino	Nationwide at-large	June 30, 2013 – June 30, 2019	16th–17th Congress	Liberal	Elected in 2013	
Bam Aquino	Nationwide at-large	June 30, 2025 – present	20th Congress	KANP	Elected in 2025	Incumbent senator
Benigno Aquino Sr.	3rd	June 5, 1928 – June 5, 1934	8th–9th Legislature	Nacionalista	Elected in 1928	
Benigno Aquino Jr.	Nationwide at-large	December 30, 1967 – September 23, 1972	6th–7th Congress	Liberal	Elected in 1967	Term expired upon declaration of martial law
Benigno Aquino III	Nationwide at-large	June 30, 2007 – June 30, 2010	14th Congress	Liberal	Elected in 2007	Left office upon election as president
Tessie Aquino-Oreta	Nationwide at-large	June 30, 1998 – June 30, 2004	11th–12th Congress	LDP	Elected in 1998	
Melecio Arranz	1st	June 5, 1928 – September 16, 1935	8th–10th Legislature	Nacionalista	Elected in 1928; Re-elected in 1934	Term expired after Senate was abolished by the 1935 Constitution
Melecio Arranz	Nationwide at-large	December 30, 1941 – December 30, 1951	1st Commonwealth Congress–2nd Congress	Liberal	Elected in 1941; Re-elected in 1946	Took office on July 4, 1945
Joker Arroyo	Nationwide at-large	June 30, 2001 – June 30, 2013	12th–15th Congress	Lakas	Elected in 2001; Re-elected in 2007	
Joker Arroyo	Nationwide at-large	June 30, 2001 – June 30, 2013	12th–15th Congress	KAMPI	Elected in 2001; Re-elected in 2007	
José María Arroyo	7th	June 19, 1919 – June 2, 1925	5th–6th Legislature	Nacionalista	Elected in 1919	
José Avelino	Nationwide at-large	May 25, 1946 – December 30, 1951	2nd Commonwealth Congress–2nd Congress	Liberal	Elected in 1946	
Dominador Aytona	Nationwide at-large	December 30, 1965 – December 30, 1971	6th–7th Congress	Nacionalista	Elected in 1965	

=== B ===
Senator	District	Term	Legislature	Party	Electoral history	Notes
Eulogio Balao	Nationwide at-large	December 30, 1957 – December 30, 1963	4th–5th Congress	Liberal	Elected in 1957	
Sotero Baluyut	3rd	June 2, 1931 – September 16, 1935	9th–10th Legislature	Nacionalista	Elected in 1931	Term expired after Senate was abolished by the 1935 Constitution
Robert Barbers	Nationwide at-large	June 30, 1998 – June 30, 2004	11th–12th Congress	Lakas	Elected in 1998	
Antonio Belo	7th	June 5, 1928 – June 5, 1934	8th–9th Legislature	Nacionalista	Elected in 1928	
Helena Benitez	Nationwide at-large	December 30, 1967 – September 23, 1972	6th–7th Congress	Nacionalista	Elected in 1967	Term expired upon declaration of martial law
Rodolfo Biazon	Nationwide at-large	June 30, 1992 – June 30, 1995; June 30, 1998 – June 30, 2010	9th, 11th–14th Congress	LDP	Elected in 1992; Elected in 1998; Re-elected in 2004	
Rodolfo Biazon	Nationwide at-large	June 30, 1992 – June 30, 1995; June 30, 1998 – June 30, 2010	9th, 11th–14th Congress	Liberal	Elected in 1992; Elected in 1998; Re-elected in 2004	
Nancy Binay	Nationwide at-large	June 30, 2013 – June 30, 2025	16th–19th Congress	UNA	Elected in 2013; Re-elected in 2019	
Manuel Briones	10th	June 2, 1931 – September 16, 1935	9th–10th Legislature	Nacionalista	Elected in 1931	Term expired after Senate was abolished by the 1935 Constitution
Manuel Briones	Nationwide at-large	December 30, 1951 – December 30, 1957	2nd–3rd Congress	Nacionalista	Elected in 1951	
Nicolas Buendia	Nationwide at-large	December 30, 1941 – May 25, 1946	1st Commonwealth Congress	Nacionalista	Elected in 1941	Took office on July 4, 1945
Hadji Butu	12th	October 16. 1916–November 15, 1920	4th–5th Legislature	Nacionalista	Appointed in 1916	Resigned
Hadji Butu	12th	June 6, 1922 – June 2, 1931	6th–8th Legislature	Democrata	Appointed in 1922; Reappointed in 1928	

=== C ===
Senator	District	Term	Legislature	Party	Electoral history	Notes
Tomas Cabili	Nationwide at-large	May 25, 1946 – December 30, 1955	2nd Commonwealth Congress–3rd Congress	Nacionalista	Elected in 1946; Re-elected in 1949	
Tomas Cabili	Nationwide at-large	May 25, 1946 – December 30, 1955	2nd Commonwealth Congress–3rd Congress	Liberal	Elected in 1946; Re-elected in 1949	
Aquilino Calvo	2nd	October 16, 1916 – February 20, 1917	4th Legislature	Nacionalista	Elected in 1916	Resigned to serve as governor of Mountain Province
Manuel Camus	12th	July 14, 1928 – June 2, 1931	8th Legislature	Nacionalista	Appointed in 1928	
Nicolas Capistrano	11th	October 16, 1916 – June 3, 1919	4th Legislature	Nacionalista	Elected in 1916	
Alan Peter Cayetano	Nationwide at-large	June 30, 2007 – May 17, 2017	14th–17th Congress	Nacionalista	Elected in 2007; Re-elected in 2013	Left office upon appointment as Secretary of Foreign Affairs
Alan Peter Cayetano	Nationwide at-large	June 30, 2022 – present	19th–20th Congress	Independent	Elected in 2022	Incumbent senator
Pia Cayetano	Nationwide at-large	June 30, 2004 – June 30, 2016; June 30, 2019 – present	13th–16th Congress, 18th–20th Congress	Nacionalista	Elected in 2004; Re-elected in 2010; Elected in 2019; Re-elected in 2025	Incumbent senator
Renato Cayetano	Nationwide at-large	June 30, 1998 – June 25, 2003	11th–12th Congress	Lakas	Elected in 1998	Died in office
Edmundo Cea	Nationwide at-large	December 30. 1953–December 30, 1959	3rd–4th Congress	Nacionalista	Elected in 1953	
José Clarín	11th	October 16, 1916 – June 2, 1935	4th–10th Legislature	Nacionalista	Elected in 1916; Re-elected in 1922; Re-elected in 1928; Re-elected in 1934	Died in office
Olegario Clarin	Nationwide at-large	May 25, 1946 – December 30, 1949	2nd Commonwealth Congress–1st Congress	Liberal	Elected in 1946	
Hermogenes Concepcion	3rd	June 5, 1934 – September 16, 1935	10th Legislature	Nacionalista	Elected in 1934	Term expired after Senate was abolished by the 1935 constitution
Tomás Confesor	Nationwide at-large	May 25, 1946 – June 6, 1951	2nd Commonwealth Congress–2nd Congress	Nacionalista	Elected in 1946	Died in office
Nikki Coseteng	Nationwide at-large	June 30, 1992 – June 30, 2001	9th–11th Congress	NPC	Elected in 1992; Re-elected in 1995	
Mariano Jesús Cuenco	Nationwide at-large	December 30, 1941 – December 30, 1951; December 30, 1953 – February 25, 1964	2nd Commonwealth Congress–2nd Congress, 3rd–5th Congress	Nacionalista	Elected in 1941; Re-elected in 1946; Elected in 1953; Re-elected in 1959	Took office on July 4, 1945
Mariano Jesús Cuenco	Nationwide at-large	December 30, 1941 – December 30, 1951; December 30, 1953 – February 25, 1964	2nd Commonwealth Congress–2nd Congress, 3rd–5th Congress	Liberal	Elected in 1941; Re-elected in 1946; Elected in 1953; Re-elected in 1959	Died in office

=== D ===
Senator	District	Term	Legislature	Party	Electoral history	Notes
Noli de Castro	Nationwide at-large	June 30, 2001 – June 30, 2004	12th Congress	Independent	Elected in 2001	Left office upon election as vice president
Alejandro de Guzmán	2nd	April 4, 1929 – June 2, 1931	8th Legislature	Nacionalista	Elected in 1929 special election	
Bernabé de Guzmán	2nd	June 3, 1919 – June 2, 1925	5th–6th Legislature	Nacionalista	Elected in 1919	
Esteban de la Rama	Nationwide at-large	December 30, 1941 – May 25, 1946	1st Commonwealth Congress	Nacionalista	Elected in 1941	Took office on July 4, 1945
Rogelio de la Rosa	Nationwide at-large	December 30, 1957 – December 30, 1963	4th–5th Congress	Liberal	Elected in 1957	
Antonio de las Alas	Nationwide at-large	December 30, 1941 – May 25, 1946	1st Commonwealth Congress	Nacionalista	Elected in 1941	Took office on July 4, 1945
Ceferino de Leon	3rd	October 25, 1919 – June 6, 1922	5th Legislature	Nacionalista	Elected in 1919 special election	
Leila de Lima	Nationwide at-large	June 30, 2016 – June 30, 2022	17th–18th Congress	Liberal	Elected in 2016	
Isabelo de los Reyes	1st	June 6, 1922 – June 5, 1928	6th–7th Legislature	Nacionalista	Elected in 1922	
Teodoro de Vera	Nationwide at-large	December 30, 1949 – April 3, 1952	2nd Congress	Liberal	Elected in 1949	Lost seat after losing an election protest
Vicente de Vera	6th	June 3, 1919 – June 2, 1925	5th–6th Legislature	Nacionalista	Elected in 1919	
Miriam Defensor Santiago	Nationwide at-large	June 30, 1995 – June 30, 2001; June 30, 2004 – June 30, 2016	10th–11th, 13th–16th Congress	PRP	Elected in 1995; Elected in 2004; Re-elected in 2010	
Ronald dela Rosa	Nationwide at-large	June 30, 2019 – present	18th–20th Congress	PDP–Laban	Elected in 2019; Re-elected in 2025	Incumbent senator
Francisco Afan Delgado	Nationwide at-large	December 30, 1951 – December 30, 1957	2nd–3rd Congress	Nacionalista	Elected in 1951	
Jose W. Diokno	Nationwide at-large	December 30, 1963 – September 23, 1972	5th–7th Congress	Nacionalista	Elected in 1963; Re-elected in 1969	Term expired upon declaration of martial law
Ramón Diokno	Nationwide at-large	May 25, 1946 – December 30, 1949	2nd Commonwealth Congress–1st Congress	Nacionalista	Elected in 1946	
Franklin Drilon	Nationwide at-large	June 30, 1995 – June 30, 2007	10th–13th Congress	Lakas	Elected in 1995; Re-elected in 2001	
Franklin Drilon	Nationwide at-large	June 30, 1995 – June 30, 2007	10th–13th Congress	Independent	Elected in 1995; Re-elected in 2001	
Franklin Drilon	Nationwide at-large	June 30, 2010 – June 30, 2022	15th–18th Congress	Liberal	Elected in 2010; Re-elected in 2016	

=== E ===
Senator	District	Term	Legislature	Party	Electoral history	Notes
JV Ejercito	Nationwide at-large	June 30, 2013 – June 30, 2019	16th–17th Congress	UNA	Elected in 2013	
JV Ejercito	Nationwide at-large	June 30, 2022 – present	19th–20th Congress	NPC	Elected in 2022	Incumbent senator
Loi Ejercito	Nationwide at-large	June 30, 2001 – June 30, 2007	12th–13th Congress	Independent	Elected in 2001	
Francisco Enage	9th	June 3, 1919 – June 2, 1925	5th–6th Legislature	Nacionalista	Elected in 1919	
Vicente Singson Encarnacion	1st	October 16, 1916 – June 6, 1922	4th–5th Legislature	Progresista	Elected in 1916	
Juan Ponce Enrile	Nationwide at-large	August 15, 1987 – June 30, 1992; June 30, 1995 – June 30, 1998	8th, 10th–11th Congress	Nacionalista	Elected in 1987; Elected in 1995	
Juan Ponce Enrile	Nationwide at-large	June 30, 2004 – June 30, 2016	13th–16th Congress	PMP	Elected in 2004; Re-elected in 2010	
Francis Escudero	Nationwide at-large	June 30, 2007 – June 30, 2019	14th–17th Congress	NPC	Elected in 2007; Re-elected in 2013	
Francis Escudero	Nationwide at-large	June 30, 2007 – June 30, 2019	14th–17th Congress	Independent	Elected in 2007; Re-elected in 2013	
Francis Escudero	Nationwide at-large	June 30, 2022 – present	19th–20th Congress	NPC	Elected in 2022	Incumbent senator
Rene Espina	Nationwide at-large	December 30, 1969 – September 23, 1972	7th Congress	Nacionalista	Elected in 1969	Term expired upon declaration of martial law
Eva Estrada-Kalaw	Nationwide at-large	December 30, 1965 – September 23, 1972	6th–7th Congress	Nacionalista	Elected in 1965; Re-elected in 1971	Term expired upon declaration of martial law
Jinggoy Estrada	Nationwide at-large	June 30, 2004 – June 30, 2016	13th–16th Congress	PMP	Elected in 2004; Re-elected in 2010	
Jinggoy Estrada	Nationwide at-large	June 30, 2022 – present	19th–20th Congress	PMP	Elected in 2022	Incumbent senator
Joseph Estrada	Nationwide at-large	June 30, 1987 – June 30, 1992	8th Congress	Nacionalista	Elected in 1987	

=== F ===
Senator	District	Term	Legislature	Party	Electoral history	Notes
Marcelo Fernan	Nationwide at-large	June 30, 1995 – June 28, 1999	10th–11th Congress	LDP	Elected in 1995	Died in office
Estanislao Fernandez	Nationwide at-large	December 30, 1959 – December 30, 1965	4th–5th Congress	Liberal	Elected in 1959	
Ramon J. Fernandez	4th	October 3, 1923 – June 2, 1925	6th Legislature	Nacionalista	Elected in 1923 special election	
Ramon J. Fernandez	Nationwide at-large	December 30, 1941 – May 25, 1946	1st Commonwealth Congress	Nacionalista	Elected in 1941	Took office on July 4, 1945
Juan Flavier	Nationwide at-large	June 30, 1995 – June 30, 2007	10th–14th Congress	Lakas	Elected in 1995; Re-elected in 2001	
Santiago Fonacier	1st	June 3, 1919 – June 2, 1925	5th–6th Legislature	Nacionalista	Elected in 1919	
Vicente Francisco	Nationwide at-large	May 25, 1946 – December 30, 1951	2nd Commonwealth Congress–2nd Congress	Liberal	Elected in 1946	
José Fuentebella	6th	June 5, 1928 – June 5, 1934	8th–9th Legislature	Nacionalista	Elected in 1928	

=== G ===
Senator	District	Term	Legislature	Party	Electoral history	Notes
Isauro Gabaldon	3rd	October 16, 1916 – June 3, 1919	4th Legislature	Nacionalista	Elected in 1916	
Juan Gaerlan	12th	June 5, 1934 – September 16, 1935	10th Legislature	Nacionalista	Appointed in 1934	
Troadio Galicano	11th	June 5, 1925 – June 2, 1931	7th–8th Legislature	Democrata	Elected in 1925	
Rodolfo Ganzon	Nationwide at-large	December 30, 1963 – December 30, 1969	5th–6th Congress	Nacionalista	Elected in 1963	
Carlos P. Garcia	Nationwide at-large	December 30, 1941 – December 30, 1953	1st Commonwealth Congress–2nd Congress	Nacionalista	Elected in 1941; Re-elected in 1946; Re-elected in 1951	Took office on July 4, 1945; Left office upon election as vice president
Win Gatchalian	Nationwide at-large	June 30, 2016 – present	17th–19th Congress	NPC	Elected in 2016; Re-elected in 2022	Incumbent senator
Jose Generoso	4th	June 5, 1928 – June 5, 1934	8th–9th Legislature	Democrata	Elected in 1928	
Bong Go	Nationwide at-large	June 30, 2019 – present	18th–20th Congress	PDP–Laban	Elected in 2019; Re-elected in 2025	Incumbent senator
Tomas Gomez	9th	June 6, 1922 – July 28, 1926	6th–7th Legislature	Nacionalista	Elected in 1922	Died in office
Matias Gonzales	2nd	May 5, 1917 – June 3, 1919	4th Legislature	Nacionalista	Elected in 1917 special election	
Neptali Gonzales	Nationwide at-large	June 30, 1987 – June 30, 1998	8th–10th Congress	UNIDO	Elected in 1987; Re-elected in 1992	
Neptali Gonzales	Nationwide at-large	June 30, 1987 – June 30, 1998	8th–10th Congress	LDP	Elected in 1987; Re-elected in 1992	
Dick Gordon	Nationwide at-large	June 30, 2004 – June 30, 2010	13th–14th Congress	Lakas	Elected in 2004	
Dick Gordon	Nationwide at-large	June 30, 2016– June 30, 2022	17th–18th Congress	Independent	Elected in 2016	
Espiridion Guanco	8th	October 16, 1916 – May 2, 1925	4th–6th Legislature	Nacionalista	Elected in 1916; Re-elected in 1922	Died in office
Mario Guariña	6th	October 16, 1916 – June 3, 1919	4th Legislature	Nacionalista	Elected in 1919	
Pedro Guevara	4th	October 16, 1916 – March 4, 1923	4th–6th Legislature	Nacionalista	Elected in 1916; Re-elected in 1922	Left office upon appointment as Resident Commissioner
Teofisto Guingona Sr.	12th	November 15, 1920 – November 13, 1923	5th–6th Legislature	Progresista	Appointed in 1920	Resigned
Teofisto Guingona Jr.	Nationwide at-large	June 30, 1987 – July 6, 1993	8th–9th Congress	Liberal	Elected in 1987; Re-elected in 1992	Left office upon appointment as Executive Secretary
Teofisto Guingona Jr.	Nationwide at-large	June 30, 1987 – July 6, 1993	8th–9th Congress	LDP	Elected in 1987; Re-elected in 1992	Left office upon appointment as Executive Secretary
Teofisto Guingona Jr.	Nationwide at-large	June 30, 1998 – February 7, 2001	11th Congress	Lakas	Elected in 1998	Left office upon appointment as vice president
TG Guingona	Nationwide at-large	June 30, 2010 – June 30, 2016	15th–16th Congress	Liberal	Elected in 2010	

=== H ===
Senator	District	Term	Legislature	Party	Electoral history	Notes
Pedro Hernaez	Nationwide at-large	December 30, 1941 – December 30, 1947	1st Commonwealth Congress–1st Congress	Nacionalista	Elected in 1941	Took office on July 4, 1945
Ernesto Herrera	Nationwide at-large	June 30, 1987 – June 30, 1992	8th Congress	Liberal	Elected in 1987; Re-elected in 1992	
Ernesto Herrera	Nationwide at-large	June 30, 1992 – June 30, 1998	9th–10th Congress	LDP	Elected in 1987; Re-elected in 1992	
Ludovico Hidrosollo	12th	June 2, 1931 – June 5, 1934	9th Legislature	Nacionalista	Appointed in 1931	
Gregorio Honasan	Nationwide at-large	June 30, 1995 – June 30, 2004; June 30, 2007 – June 30, 2019	10th–12th, 14th–17th Congress	Independent	Elected in 1995; Re-elected in 2001 special election Elected in 2007; Re-elected in 2013	
Gregorio Honasan	Nationwide at-large	June 30, 1995 – June 30, 2004; June 30, 2007 – June 30, 2019	10th–12th, 14th–17th Congress	UNA	Elected in 1995; Re-elected in 2001 special election Elected in 2007; Re-elected in 2013	
Jose Hontiveros	7th	June 6, 1922 – June 5, 1928	6th–7th Legislature	Democrata	Elected in 1922	
Risa Hontiveros	Nationwide at-large	June 30, 2016 – present	17th–20th Congress	Akbayan	Elected in 2016; Re-elected in 2022	Incumbent senator

=== I ===
Senator	District	Term	Legislature	Party	Electoral history	Notes
Eddie Ilarde	Nationwide at-large	January 24, 1972 – September 23, 1972	7th Congress	Liberal	Elected in 1971	Term expired upon declaration of martial law
Vicente Ilustre	5th	October 16, 1916 – June 3, 1919	4th Legislature	Independent	Elected in 1916	
Domingo Imperial	6th	June 5, 1934 – September 16, 1935	10th Legislature	Nacionalista	Elected in 1934	Term expired after Senate was abolished by the 1935 Constitution
Domingo Imperial	Nationwide at-large	December 30, 1941 – May 25, 1946	1st Commonwealth Congress	Nacionalista	Elected in 1941	Took office on July 4, 1945
Leoncio Imperial	6th	October 16, 1916 – June 6, 1922	4th–5th Legislature	Nacionalista	Elected in 1916	

=== J ===
Senator	District	Term	Legislature	Party	Electoral history	Notes
Robert Jaworski	Nationwide at-large	June 30, 1998 – June 30, 2004	11th Congress	PMP	Elected in 1998	

=== K ===
Senator	District	Term	Legislature	Party	Electoral history	Notes
Maria Kalaw-Katigbak	Nationwide at-large	December 30, 1961 – December 30, 1967	5th–6th Congress	Liberal	Elected in 1961	
Ruperto Kangleon	Nationwide at-large	December 30, 1953 – February 27, 1958	3rd–4th Congress	Democratic	Elected in 1953	Died in office
Jamalul Kiram II	12th	June 2, 1931 – June 5, 1934	9th Legislature	Independent	Appointed in 1931	

=== L ===
Senator	District	Term	Legislature	Party	Electoral history	Notes
Isaac Lacson	8th	June 5, 1934 – September 16, 1935	10th Legislature	Nacionalista	Elected in 1934	Term expired after Senate was abolished by the 1935 Constitution
Panfilo Lacson	Nationwide at-large	June 30, 2001 – June 30, 2013	12th–15th Congress	LDP	Elected in 2001; Re-elected in 2007	
Panfilo Lacson	Nationwide at-large	June 30, 2016 – June 30, 2022	17th–18th Congress	Independent	Elected in 2016	
Panfilo Lacson	Nationwide at-large	June 30, 2025 – present	20th Congress	Independent	Elected in 2025	Incumbent senator
Wenceslao Lagumbay	Nationwide at-large	December 30, 1965 – December 30, 1971	6th–7th Congress	Nacionalista	Elected in 1965	
Lito Lapid	Nationwide at-large	June 30, 2004 – June 30, 2016	13th–16th Congress	Lakas	Elected in 2004; Re-elected in 2010	
Lito Lapid	Nationwide at-large	June 30, 2004 – June 30, 2016	13th–16th Congress	Lakas-Kampi	Elected in 2004; Re-elected in 2010	
Lito Lapid	Nationwide at-large	June 30, 2019 – present	18th–19th Congress	NPC	Elected in 2019	Incumbent senator
Jose P. Laurel	5th	June 2, 1925 – June 2, 1931	7th–8th Legislature	Nacionalista	Elected in 1925	
Jose P. Laurel	Nationwide at-large	December 30, 1951 – December 30, 1957	2nd–3rd Congress	Nacionalista	Elected in 1951	
Salvador Laurel	Nationwide at-large	December 30, 1967 – September 23, 1972	6th–7th Congress	Nacionalista	Elected in 1967	Term expired upon declaration of martial law
Sotero Laurel	Nationwide at-large	June 30, 1987 – June 30, 1992	8th Congress	Nacionalista	Elected in 1987	
Jose Ledesma	7th	June 2, 1925 – June 2, 1931	7th–8th Legislature	Nacionalista	Elected in 1925	
Oscar Ledesma	Nationwide at-large	December 30, 1957 – December 30, 1963	4th–5th Congress	Nacionalista	Elected in 1957	
Loren Legarda	Nationwide at-large	June 30, 1998 – June 30, 2004	11th–12th Congress	Lakas	Elected in 1998	
Loren Legarda	Nationwide at-large	June 30, 2007 – June 30, 2019	14th–17th Congress	NPC	Elected in 2007; Re-elected in 2013	
Loren Legarda	Nationwide at-large	June 30, 2022 – present	19th–20th Congress	NPC	Elected in 2022	Incumbent senator
Alfredo Lim	Nationwide at-large	June 30, 2004 – June 30, 2007	13th Congress	PMP	Elected in 2004	Left office upon election as mayor of Manila
Roseller T. Lim	Nationwide at-large	December 30, 1955 – December 30, 1963	3rd–5th Congress	Nacionalista	Elected in 1955 special election Re-elected in 1957	
Joey Lina	Nationwide at-large	June 30, 1987 – June 30, 1995	8th–9th Congress	UNIDO	Elected in 1987; Re-elected in 1992	
Joey Lina	Nationwide at-large	June 30, 1987 – June 30, 1995	8th–9th Congress	LDP	Elected in 1987; Re-elected in 1992	
Francisco Tongio Liongson	3rd	October 16, 1916 – February 20, 1919	4th Legislature	Nacionalista	Elected in 1916	Died in office
Juan Liwag	Nationwide at-large	December 30, 1963 – December 30, 1969	5th–6th Congress	Liberal	Elected in 1963	
Jose Locsin	Nationwide at-large	December 30, 1951 – December 30, 1957	2nd–3rd Congress	Nacionalista	Elected in 1951	
Fernando Lopez	Nationwide at-large	December 30, 1947 – December 30, 1949	1st Congress	Liberal	Elected in 1947	Left office upon election as vice president
Fernando Lopez	Nationwide at-large	December 30, 1953 – December 30, 1965	3rd–5th Congress	Democratic	Elected in 1953; Re-elected in 1959	
Fernando Lopez	Nationwide at-large	December 30, 1953 – December 30, 1965	3rd–5th Congress	Nacionalista	Elected in 1953; Re-elected in 1959	
Manuel Lopez	8th	October 16, 1916 – June 3, 1919	4th Legislature	Nacionalista	Elected in 1916	
Santiago Lucero	3rd	June 6, 1922 – November 2, 1925	6th Legislature	Democrata	Elected in 1922	Died in office
Joaquin Luna	12th	October 16, 1916 – July 1, 1920	4th–5th Legislature	Nacionalista	Appointed in 1916; Reappointed in 1919	Left office upon appointment as governor of Mountain Province

=== M ===
Senator	District	Term	Legislature	Party	Electoral history	Notes
Alejo Mabanag	2nd	June 6, 1922 – June 5, 1928	6th–7th Legislature	Nacionalista	Elected in 1922	
Alejo Mabanag	2nd	June 2, 1931 – September 16, 1935	9th–10th Legislature	Democrata	Elected in 1931	Term expired after Senate was abolished by the 1935 Constitution
Alejo Mabanag	Nationwide at-large	May 25, 1946 – December 30, 1949	2nd Commonwealth Congress–1st Congress	Nacionalista	Elected in 1946	
Gloria Macapagal Arroyo	Nationwide at-large	June 30, 1992 – June 30, 1998	9th–10th Congress	LDP	Elected in 1992; Re-elected in 1995	Left office upon election as vice president
Ernesto Maceda	Nationwide at-large	December 30, 1971 – September 23, 1972	7th Congress	Nacionalista	Elected in 1971	Term expired upon declaration of martial law
Ernesto Maceda	Nationwide at-large	June 30, 1987 – June 30, 1998	8th–10th Congress	PDP–Laban	Elected in 1987; Re-elected in 1992	
Ernesto Maceda	Nationwide at-large	June 30, 1987 – June 30, 1998	8th–10th Congress	NPC	Elected in 1987; Re-elected in 1992	
Jamby Madrigal	Nationwide at-large	June 30, 2004 – June 30, 2010	13th–14th Congress	LDP	Elected in 2004	
Pacita Madrigal-Warns	Nationwide at-large	December 30, 1955 – December 30, 1961	3rd–4th Congress	Nacionalista	Elected in 1955	
Vicente Madrigal	Nationwide at-large	December 30, 1941 – December 30, 1953	1st Commonwealth Congress–2nd Congress	Liberal	Elected in 1941; Re-elected in 1947	Took office on July 4, 1945
Enrique Magalona	Nationwide at-large	May 25, 1946 – December 30, 1955	2nd Commonwealth Congress–3rd Congress	Liberal	Elected in 1946; Re-elected in 1949	
Genaro Magsaysay	Nationwide at-large	December 30, 1959 – September 23, 1972	4th–7th Congress	Nacionalista	Elected in 1959; Re-elected in 1965; Re-elected in 1971	Term expired upon declaration of martial law
Genaro Magsaysay	Nationwide at-large	December 30, 1959 – September 23, 1972	4th–7th Congress	Liberal	Elected in 1959; Re-elected in 1965; Re-elected in 1971	Term expired upon declaration of martial law
Ramon Magsaysay Jr.	Nationwide at-large	June 30, 1995 – June 30, 2007	10th–13th Congress	Lakas	Elected in 1995; Re-elected in 2001	
Ramon Magsaysay Jr.	Nationwide at-large	June 30, 1995 – June 30, 2007	10th–13th Congress	Independent	Elected in 1995; Re-elected in 2001	
Manuel Manahan	Nationwide at-large	December 30, 1961 – December 30, 1967	5th–7th Congress	Progressive	Elected in 1961	
Raul Manglapus	Nationwide at-large	December 30, 1961 – December 30, 1967	5th–7th Congress	Progressive	Elected in 1961	
Raul Manglapus	Nationwide at-large	June 30, 1987 – October 9, 1987	8th Congress	LABAN	Elected in 1987	Left office upon appointment as Secretary of Foreign Affairs
Bongbong Marcos	Nationwide at-large	June 30, 2010 – June 30, 2016	15th–16th Congress	Nacionalista	Elected in 2010	
Rodante Marcoleta	Nationwide at-large	June 30, 2025 – present	20th Congress	Independent	Elected in 2025	Incumbent senator
Imee Marcos	Nationwide at-large	June 30, 2019 – present	18th–20th Congress	Nacionalista	Elected in 2019; Re-elected in 2025	Incumbent senator
Ferdinand Marcos	Nationwide at-large	December 30, 1959 – December 30, 1965	4th–5th Congress	Liberal	Elected in 1959	
Rafael Martinez	Nationwide at-large	December 30, 1941 – May 25, 1946	1st Commonwealth Congress	Nacionalista	Elected in 1941	Took office on July 4, 1945
Orly Mercado	Nationwide at-large	June 30, 1987 – June 30, 1998	8th–10th Congress	Liberal	Elected in 1987; Re-elected in 1992	
Orly Mercado	Nationwide at-large	June 30, 1987 – June 30, 1998	8th–10th Congress	LDP	Elected in 1987; Re-elected in 1992	
Ramon Mitra Jr.	Nationwide at-large	December 30, 1971 – September 23, 1972	7th Congress	Liberal	Elected in 1971	Term expired upon declaration of martial law
Justiniano Montano	Nationwide at-large	December 30, 1949 – December 30, 1955	2nd–3rd Congress	Liberal	Elected in 1949	
Gil Montilla	8th	June 2, 1931 – September 16, 1935	9th–10th Legislature	Nacionalista	Elected in 1931	Term expired after Senate was abolished by the 1935 Constitution
Ruperto Montinola	7th	June 2, 1931 – September 16, 1935	9th–10th Legislature	Democrata	Elected in 1931	Term expired after Senate was abolished by the 1935 Constitution
Luis Morales	3rd	March 23, 1926 – June 5, 1928	7th Legislature	Democrata	Elected in 1926 special election	

=== N ===
Senator	District	Term	Legislature	Party	Electoral history	Notes
Juan Nolasco	4th	June 2, 1931 – September 16, 1935	9th–10th Legislature	Nacionalista	Elected in 1931	Term expired after Senate was abolished by the 1935 Constitution

=== O ===
Senator	District	Term	Legislature	Party	Electoral history	Notes
Blas Ople	Nationwide at-large	June 30, 1992 – July 16, 2002	9th–12th Congress	LDP	Elected in 1992; Re-elected in 1998	Left office upon appointment as Secretary of Foreign Affairs
Camilo Osías	2nd	June 2, 1925 – February 7, 1929	7th–8th Legislature	Nacionalista	Elected in 1925	Left office upon appointment as Resident Commissioner
Camilo Osías	Nationwide at-large	December 30, 1947 – December 30, 1953	1st–2nd Congress	Nacionalista	Elected in 1947	
Camilo Osías	Nationwide at-large	December 30, 1961 – December 30, 1967	5th–6th Congress	Liberal	Elected in 1961	
John Henry Osmeña	Nationwide at-large	December 30, 1971 – September 23, 1972	7th Congress	Liberal	Elected in 1971	Term expired upon declaration of martial law
John Henry Osmeña	Nationwide at-large	June 30, 1987 – June 30, 1995; June 30, 1998 – June 30, 2004	8th–9th, 11th–12th Congress	Liberal	Elected in 1987; Re-elected in 1992; Elected in 1998	
John Henry Osmeña	Nationwide at-large	June 30, 1987 – June 30, 1995; June 30, 1998 – June 30, 2004	8th–9th, 11th–12th Congress	NPC	Elected in 1987; Re-elected in 1992; Elected in 1998	
Sergio Osmeña	10th	June 6, 1922 – September 16, 1935	9th–10th Legislature	Nacionalista	Elected in 1922; Re-elected in 1928; Re-elected in 1934	Term expired after Senate was abolished by the 1935 Constitution
Sergio Osmeña Jr.	Nationwide at-large	December 30, 1965 – December 30, 1971	6th–7th Congress	Liberal	Elected in 1965	
Serge Osmeña	Nationwide at-large	June 30, 1995 – June 30, 2007	10th–13th Congress	Lakas	Elected in 1995; Re-elected in 2001	
Serge Osmeña	Nationwide at-large	June 30, 1995 – June 30, 2007	10th–13th Congress	PDP–Laban	Elected in 1995; Re-elected in 2001	
Serge Osmeña	Nationwide at-large	June 30, 2010 – June 30, 2016	15th–16th Congress	Independent	Elected in 2010	

=== P ===
Senator	District	Term	Legislature	Party	Electoral history	Notes
Manny Pacquiao	Nationwide at-large	June 30, 2016 – June 30, 2022	17th–18th Congress	PDP–Laban	Elected in 2016	
Ambrosio Padilla	Nationwide at-large	December 30, 1957 – September 23, 1972	4th–7th Congress	Liberal	Elected in 1957; Re-elected in 1963; Re-elected in 1969	Term expired upon declaration of martial law
Robin Padilla	Nationwide at-large	June 30, 2022 – present	19th–20th Congress	PDP–Laban	Elected in 2022	Incumbent senator
Rafael Palma	4th	October 16, 1916 – June 6, 1922	4th–5th Legislature	Nacionalista	Elected in 1916	
Francis Pangilinan	Nationwide at-large	June 30, 2001 – June 30, 2013; June 30, 2016 – June 30, 2022	12th–15th, 17th–18th Congress	Liberal	Elected in 2001; Re-elected in 2007; Elected in 2016	
Francis Pangilinan	Nationwide at-large	June 30, 2025 – present	20th Congress	Liberal	Elected in 2025	Incumbent senator
Quintin Paredes	Nationwide at-large	December 30, 1941 – May 25, 1946	1st Commonwealth Congress	Nacionalista	Elected in 1941	Took office on July 4, 1945
Quintin Paredes	Nationwide at-large	December 30, 1949 – December 30, 1961	2nd–4th Congress	Liberal	Elected in 1949; Re-elected in 1955	
Quintin Paredes	Nationwide at-large	December 30, 1949 – December 30, 1961	2nd–4th Congress	Nacionalista	Elected in 1949; Re-elected in 1955	
Vicente Paterno	Nationwide at-large	June 30, 1987 – June 30, 1992	8th Congress	PDP–Laban	Elected in 1987	
Geronima Pecson	Nationwide at-large	December 30, 1947 – December 30, 1953	1st–2nd Congress	Liberal	Elected in 1947	
Salipada Pendatun	Nationwide at-large	May 25, 1946 – December 30, 1949	2nd Commonwealth Congress–1st Congress	Liberal	Elected in 1946	
Emmanuel Pelaez	Nationwide at-large	December 30, 1953 – December 30, 1959; December 30, 1967 – September 23, 1972	3rd–4th, 6th–7th Congress	Nacionalista	Elected in 1953; Elected in 1967	Term expired upon declaration of martial law
Macario Peralta Jr.	Nationwide at-large	December 30, 1949 – December 30, 1955	2nd–3rd Congress	Liberal	Elected in 1949	
Leonardo Perez	Nationwide at-large	December 30, 1967 – September 23, 1972	6th–7th Congress	Nacionalista	Elected in 1953; Elected in 1967	Term expired upon declaration of martial law
Aquilino Pimentel Jr.	Nationwide at-large	June 30, 1987 – June 30, 1992; June 30, 1998 – June 30, 2010	8th, 11th–14th Congress	PDP–Laban	Elected in 1987; Elected in 1998; Re-elected in 2004	
Koko Pimentel	Nationwide at-large	August 11, 2011 – June 30, 2025	15th–19th Congress	PDP–Laban	Won election protest in 2011; Elected in 2013; Re-elected in 2019	
Koko Pimentel	Nationwide at-large	August 11, 2011 – June 30, 2025	15th–19th Congress	Nacionalista	Won election protest in 2011; Elected in 2013; Re-elected in 2019	
Grace Poe	Nationwide at-large	June 30, 2013 – June 30, 2025	16th–19th Congress	Independent	Elected in 2013; Re-elected in 2019	
Cipriano Primicias Sr.	Nationwide at-large	December 30, 1951 – December 30, 1963	2nd–5th Congress	Nacionalista	Elected in 1951; Re-elected in 1957	
Gil Puyat	Nationwide at-large	December 30, 1951 – September 23, 1972	2nd–7th Congress	Nacionalista	Elected in 1951; Re-elected in 1957; Re-elected in 1963; Re-elected in 1969	Term expired upon declaration of martial law

=== Q ===
Senator	District	Term	Legislature	Party	Electoral history	Notes
Manuel L. Quezon	5th	October 16, 1916 – September 16, 1935	4th–10th Legislature	Nacionalista	Elected in 1916; Re-elected in 1922; Re-elected in 1928; Re-elected in 1934	Term expired after Senate was abolished by the 1935 Constitution
Elpidio Quirino	1st	June 2, 1925 – September 16, 1935	7th–10th Legislature	Nacionalista	Elected in 1925; Re-elected in 1931	Term expired after Senate was abolished by the 1935 Constitution
Elpidio Quirino	Nationwide at-large	December 30, 1941 – May 28, 1946	1st Commonwealth Congress	Nacionalista	Elected in 1941	Took office on July 4, 1945; Left office upon election as vice president

=== R ===
Senator	District	Term	Legislature	Party	Electoral history	Notes
Vicente Rama	Nationwide at-large	December 30, 1941 – December 30, 1947	1st Commonwealth Congress–1st Congress	Nacionalista	Elected in 1941	Took office on July 4, 1945
Leticia Ramos-Shahani	Nationwide at-large	June 30, 1987 – June 30, 1998	8th–10th Congress	UNIDO	Elected in 1987; Re-elected in 1992	
Leticia Ramos-Shahani	Nationwide at-large	June 30, 1987 – June 30, 1998	8th–10th Congress	Lakas	Elected in 1987; Re-elected in 1992	
Santanina Rasul	Nationwide at-large	June 30, 1987 – June 30, 1995	8th–9th Congress	Liberal	Elected in 1987; Re-elected in 1992	
Santanina Rasul	Nationwide at-large	June 30, 1987 – June 30, 1995	8th–9th Congress	Lakas	Elected in 1987; Re-elected in 1992	
Claro M. Recto	5th	June 2, 1931 – September 16, 1935	9th–10th Legislature	Democrata	Elected in 1931	Term expired after Senate was abolished by the 1935 Constitution
Claro M. Recto	Nationwide at-large	December 30, 1941 – May 28, 1946; April 3, 1952 – October 2, 1960	1st Commonwealth Congress, 2nd–4th Congress	Nacionalista	Elected in 1941; Won election protest in 1952; Elected in 1955	Took office on July 4, 1945; Died in office
Ralph Recto	Nationwide at-large	June 30, 2001 – June 30, 2007	12th–13th Congress	Lakas	Elected in 2001	
Ralph Recto	Nationwide at-large	June 30, 2010 – June 30, 2022	15th–18th Congress	Liberal	Elected in 2010; Re-elected in 2016	
Bong Revilla	Nationwide at-large	June 30, 2004 – June 30, 2016	13th–16th Congress	Lakas	Elected in 2004; Re-elected in 2010	
Bong Revilla	Nationwide at-large	June 30, 2004 – June 30, 2016	13th–16th Congress	Lakas-Kampi	Elected in 2004; Re-elected in 2010	
Bong Revilla	Nationwide at-large	June 30, 2019 – June 30, 2025	18th–19th Congress	Lakas	Elected in 2019	
Ramon Revilla Sr.	Nationwide at-large	June 30, 1992 – June 30, 2004	9th–12th Congress	LDP	Elected in 1992; Re-elected in 1998	
Ramon Revilla Sr.	Nationwide at-large	June 30, 1992 – June 30, 2004	9th–12th Congress	Lakas	Elected in 1992; Re-elected in 1998	
Raul Roco	Nationwide at-large	June 30, 1992 – February 9, 2001	9th–12th Congress	LDP	Elected in 1992; Elected in 1995	Left office upon appointment as Secretary of Education, Culture and Sports
Francisco Soc Rodrigo	Nationwide at-large	December 30, 1955 – December 30, 1967	3rd–6th Congress	Nacionalista	Elected in 1955; Re-elected in 1961	
Celestino Rodriguez	10th	October 16, 1916 – June 2, 1925	4th–6th Legislature	Nacionalista	Elected in 1916; Re-elected in 1919	
Pedro Rodríguez	10th	June 2, 1925 – June 2, 1931	7th–8th Legislature	Nacionalista	Elected in 1925	
Eulogio Rodriguez	Nationwide at-large	December 30, 1941 – December 30, 1947; December 16, 1949 – December 9, 1964	1st Commonwealth Congress–1st Congress, 2nd–5th Congress	Nacionalista	Elected in 1941; Won election protest in 1949; Re-elected in 1953; Re-elected in 1959	Took office on July 4, 1945; Died in office
José E. Romero	Nationwide at-large	May 25, 1946 – May 22, 1947	2nd Commonwealth Congress–1st Congress	Nacionalista	Elected in 1946	Lost seat after losing electoral protest
Alberto Romulo	Nationwide at-large	June 30, 1987 – June 30, 1998	8th–10th Congress	UNIDO	Elected in 1987; Re-elected in 1992	
Alberto Romulo	Nationwide at-large	June 30, 1987 – June 30, 1998	8th–10th Congress	LDP	Elected in 1987; Re-elected in 1992	
Decoroso Rosales	Nationwide at-large	December 30, 1955 – December 30, 1961	3rd–4th Congress	Nacionalista	Elected in 1955	
Gerardo Roxas	Nationwide at-large	December 30, 1963 – September 23, 1972	5th–7th Congress	Liberal	Elected in 1963; Re-elected in 1969	Term expired upon declaration of martial law
Manuel Roxas	Nationwide at-large	December 30, 1941 – May 25, 1946	1st Commonwealth Congress	Nacionalista	Elected in 1941	Took office on July 4, 1945
Mar Roxas	Nationwide at-large	June 30, 2004 – June 30, 2010	13th–14th Congress	Liberal	Elected in 2004	
Jose Roy	Nationwide at-large	December 30, 1961 – September 23, 1972	5th–7th Congress	Nacionalista	Elected in 1961; Re-elected in 1967	Term expired upon declaration of martial law

=== S ===
Senator	District	Term	Legislature	Party	Electoral history	Notes
Pastor Salazar	9th	December 30, 1926 – June 5, 1928	7th Legislature	Nacionalista	Elected in 1926 special election	
Jovito Salonga	Nationwide at-large	December 30, 1965 – September 23, 1972	6th–7th Congress	Liberal	Elected in 1965; Re-elected in 1971	Term expired upon declaration of martial law
Jovito Salonga	Nationwide at-large	June 30, 1987 – June 30, 1992	8th Congress	Liberal	Elected in 1987	
Teodoro Sandiko	3rd	June 3, 1919 – June 2, 1931	5th–8th Legislature	Democrata	Elected in 1919; Re-elected in 1925	
Lope K. Santos	12th	July 1, 1920 – November 15, 1921	5th Legislature	Nacionalista	Appointed in 1920	Resigned
Pedro Sabido	Nationwide at-large	December 30, 1955 – December 30, 1961	3rd–4th Congress	Nacionalista	Elected in 1955	
Prospero Sanidad	Nationwide at-large	May 22, 1947 – December 30, 1947	1st Congress	Liberal	Won election protest in 1947	
Rene Saguisag	Nationwide at-large	June 30, 1987 – June 30, 1992	8th Congress	Liberal	Elected in 1987	
Proceso Sebastian	Nationwide at-large	December 30, 1941 – December 30, 1947	1st Commonwealth Congress–1st Congress	Nacionalista	Elected in 1941	Took office on July 4, 1945
Esteban Singson	9th	October 16, 1916 – June 6, 1922	4th Legislature	Nacionalista	Elected in 1916	
Datu Sinsuat Balabaran	12th	June 5, 1934 – September 16, 1935	10th Legislature	Nacionalista	Appointed in 1934	Term expired after Senate was abolished by the 1935 Constitution
Pedro María Sison	2nd	October 16, 1916 – June 6, 1922	4th Legislature	Nacionalista	Elected in 1916	
Teófilo Sison	2nd	June 5, 1928 – September 16, 1935	8th–10th Legislature	Nacionalista	Elected in 1928; Re-elected in 1934	Term expired after Senate was abolished by the 1935 Constitution
Antero Soriano	5th	June 3, 1919 – June 2, 1925	5th–6th Legislature	Nacionalista	Elected in 1919	
Francisco Soriano	11th	June 3, 1919 – June 2, 1925	5th–6th Legislature	Nacionalista	Elected in 1919	
Filemon Sotto	10th	June 3, 1916 – June 6, 1922	4th–5th Legislature	Nacionalista	Elected in 1916	
Tito Sotto	Nationwide at-large	June 30, 1992 – June 30, 2004	9th–12th Congress	LDP	Elected in 1992; Re-elected in 1998	
Tito Sotto	Nationwide at-large	June 30, 2010 – June 30, 2022	15th–18th Congress	NPC	Elected in 2010; Re-elected in 2016	
Tito Sotto	Nationwide at-large	June 30, 2025 – present	20th Congress	NPC	Elected in 2025	Incumbent senator
Vicente Sotto	Nationwide at-large	May 25, 1946 – May 28, 1950	2nd Commonwealth Congress–2nd Congress	Popular Front	Elected in 1946	Died in office
Juan Sumulong	4th	June 2, 1925 – June 2, 1931	7th–8th Legislature	Democrata	Elected in 1925	
Juan Sumulong	4th	June 5, 1934 – September 16, 1935	10th Legislature	Nacionalista	Elected in 1934	Term expired after Senate was abolished by the 1935 Constitution
Lorenzo Sumulong	Nationwide at-large	December 30, 1949 – December 30, 1967	2nd–6th Congress	Liberal	Elected in 1949; Re-elected in 1955; Re-elected in 1961	
Lorenzo Sumulong	Nationwide at-large	December 30, 1949 – December 30, 1967	2nd–6th Congress	Nacionalista	Elected in 1949; Re-elected in 1955; Re-elected in 1961	
Lorenzo Sumulong	Nationwide at-large	December 30, 1969 – September 23, 1972	7th Congress	Nacionalista	Elected in 1969	Term expired upon declaration of martial law

=== T ===
Senator	District	Term	Legislature	Party	Electoral history	Notes
Mamintal A.J. Tamano	Nationwide at-large	December 30, 1969 – September 23, 1972	7th Congress	Nacionalista	Elected in 1969	Term expired upon declaration of martial law
Mamintal A.J. Tamano	Nationwide at-large	June 30, 1987 – June 30, 1992	8th Congress	UNIDO	Elected in 1987	
Carlos Tan	Nationwide at-large	December 30, 1947 – December 16, 1949	1st Congress	Liberal	Elected in 1947	Lost seat after losing electoral protest
Lorenzo Tañada	Nationwide at-large	December 30, 1947 – December 30, 1971	1st–7th Congress	Liberal	Elected in 1947; Re-elected in 1953; Re-elected in 1959; Re-elected in 1965	
Lorenzo Tañada	Nationwide at-large	December 30, 1947 – December 30, 1971	1st–7th Congress	Citizens'	Elected in 1947; Re-elected in 1953; Re-elected in 1959; Re-elected in 1965	
Lorenzo Tañada	Nationwide at-large	December 30, 1947 – December 30, 1971	1st–7th Congress	NCP	Elected in 1947; Re-elected in 1953; Re-elected in 1959; Re-elected in 1965	
Wigberto Tañada	Nationwide at-large	June 30, 1987 – June 30, 1995	8th–9th Congress	Liberal	Elected in 1987; Re-elected in 1992	
Francisco Tatad	Nationwide at-large	June 30, 1992 – June 30, 2001	9th–11th Congress	NPC	Elected in 1992; Re-elected in 1995	
Francisco Tatad	Nationwide at-large	June 30, 1992 – June 30, 2001	9th–11th Congress	LDP	Elected in 1992; Re-elected in 1995	
Francisco Tatad	Nationwide at-large	June 30, 1992 – June 30, 2001	9th–11th Congress	Gabay Bayan	Elected in 1992; Re-elected in 1995	
Lorenzo Teves	Nationwide at-large	December 30, 1967 – September 23, 1972	6th–7th Congress	Nacionalista	Elected in 1967	Term expired upon declaration of martial law
Emiliano Tria Tirona	4th	June 6, 1922 – June 5, 1928	6th–7th Legislature	Democrata	Elected in 1922	
Emiliano Tria Tirona	Nationwide at-large	December 30, 1941 – April 8, 1952	1st Commonwealth Congress–2nd Congress	Nacionalista	Elected in 1941; Re-elected in 1947	Took office on July 4, 1945
Emiliano Tria Tirona	Nationwide at-large	December 30, 1941 – April 8, 1952	1st Commonwealth Congress–2nd Congress	Liberal	Elected in 1941; Re-elected in 1947	Died in office
Arturo Tolentino	Nationwide at-large	December 30, 1957 – September 23, 1972	4th–7th Congress	Nacionalista	Elected in 1957; Re-elected in 1963; Re-elected in 1969	Term expired upon declaration of martial law
Arturo Tolentino	Nationwide at-large	June 30, 1992 – June 30, 1995	9th Congress	NPC	Elected in 1992	
Francis Tolentino	Nationwide at-large	June 30, 2019 – June 30, 2025	18th–19th Congress	PDP–Laban	Elected in 2019	
Francis Tolentino	Nationwide at-large	June 30, 2019 – June 30, 2025	18th–19th Congress	PFP	Elected in 2019	
Juan Torralba	11th	June 2, 1931 – September 16, 1935	9th–10th Legislature	Nacionalista	Elected in 1931	Term expired after Senate was abolished by the 1935 Constitution
Ramon Torres	Nationwide at-large	December 30, 1941 – December 30, 1951	1st Commonwealth Congress–2nd Congress	Liberal	Elected in 1941; Re-elected in 1946	Took office on July 4, 1945
Potenciano Treñas	7th	June 5–10, 1934	10th Legislature	Nacionalista	Elected in 1934	Died in office
Antonio Trillanes	Nationwide at-large	June 30, 2007 – June 30, 2019	14th–17th Congress	Nacionalista	Elected in 2007; Re-elected in 2013	
Erwin Tulfo	Nationwide at-large	June 30, 2025 – present	20th Congress	Lakas	Elected in 2025	Incumbent senator
Raffy Tulfo	Nationwide at-large	June 30, 2022 – present	19th–20th Congress	Independent	Elected in 2022	Incumbent senator

=== V ===
Senator	District	Term	Legislature	Party	Electoral history	Notes
Jose Maria Veloso	9th	October 16, 1916 – June 3, 1919	4th Legislature	Nacionalista	Elected in 1916	
José O. Vera	6th	June 2, 1925 – September 16, 1935	9th–10th Legislature	Nacionalista	Elected in 1925; Re-elected in 1931 special election	Term expired after Senate was abolished by the 1935 Constitution
José O. Vera	Nationwide at-large	May 25, 1946 – December 30, 1949	2nd Commonwealth Congress–1st Congress	Nacionalista	Elected in 1946	
Felixberto Verano	Nationwide at-large	December 30, 1951 – December 30, 1953	2nd Congress	Nacionalista	Elected in 1951 special election	
Juan Villamor	1st	October 16, 1916 – June 3, 1919	4th Legislature	Nacionalista	Elected in 1916	
Francisco Felipe Villanueva	7th	October 16, 1916 – June 3, 1919	4th Legislature	Nacionalista	Elected in 1916	
Hermenegildo Villanueva	8th	June 3, 1919 – June 2, 1931	5th–8th Legislature	Nacionalista	Elected in 1919; Re-elected in 1925	
Joel Villanueva	Nationwide at-large	June 30, 2016 – present	17th–20th Congress	Liberal	Elected in 2016; Re-elected in 2022	
Joel Villanueva	Nationwide at-large	June 30, 2016 – present	17th–20th Congress	Independent	Elected in 2016; Re-elected in 2022	Incumbent senator
Camille Villar	Nationwide at-large	June 30, 2025 – present	20th Congress	Nacionalista	Elected in 2025	Incumbent senator
Cynthia Villar	Nationwide at-large	June 30, 2013 – June 30, 2025	16th–19th Congress	Nacionalista	Elected in 2013; Re-elected in 2019	
Manuel Villar	Nationwide at-large	June 30, 2001 – June 30, 2013	12th–15th Congress	Nacionalista	Elected in 2001; Re-elected in 2007	
Mark Villar	Nationwide at-large	June 30, 2022 – present	19th–20th Congress	Nacionalista	Elected in 2022	Incumbent senator

=== W ===
Senator	District	Term	Legislature	Party	Electoral history	Notes
Freddie Webb	Nationwide at-large	June 30, 1992 – June 30, 1998	9th–10th Congress	LDP	Elected in 1992	

=== Y ===
Senator	District	Term	Legislature	Party	Electoral history	Notes
José Yulo	Nationwide at-large	December 30, 1941 – May 25, 1946	1st Commonwealth Congress	Nacionalista	Elected in 1941	Took office on July 4, 1945
Mariano Yulo	8th	August 31, 1925 – July 11, 1929	6th–8th Legislature	Nacionalista	Elected in 1925 special election Re-elected in 1928	Died in office

=== Z ===
Senator	District	Term	Legislature	Party	Electoral history	Notes
Tecla San Andres Ziga	Nationwide at-large	December 30, 1963 – December 30, 1969	5th–6th Congress	Liberal	Elected in 1963	
Victor Ziga	Nationwide at-large	June 30, 1987 – June 30, 1992	8th Congress	Liberal	Elected in 1987	
Migz Zubiri	Nationwide at-large	June 30, 2007 – August 3, 2011	14th–15th Congress	Lakas	Elected in 2007	Resigned
Migz Zubiri	Nationwide at-large	June 30, 2016 – present	17th–20th Congress	Independent	Elected in 2016; Re-elected in 2022	Incumbent senator
Francisco Zulueta	8th	September 18, 1929 – June 5, 1934	8th–9th Legislature	Nacionalista	Elected in 1929 special election	
Jose Zulueta	Nationwide at-large	December 30, 1951 – December 30, 1957	2nd–3rd Congress	Nacionalista	Elected in 1951	

== Died before taking office ==
The following won senatorial elections, but died prior to taking office:

Senator-elect	District	Election day	Date of death	Supposed start of term	Supposed to have taken office on	Legislature	Party
Juan B. Alegre	6th	June 2, 1931	June 14, 1931	June 2, 1931	July 16, 1931	9th Legislature	Democrata
Daniel Maramba	Nationwide at-large	December 30,1941	December 28, 1941	December 30, 1941	July 4, 1945	1st Commonwealth Congress	Nacionalista
José Ozámiz	Nationwide at-large	December 30, 1941	August 30, 1944	December 30, 1941	July 4, 1945	1st Commonwealth Congress	Nacionalista

== See also ==
- List of members of the House of Representatives of the Philippines
- List of female senators of the Philippines
