= 5th Philippine Legislature =

7th legislative term of the Philippines

←	4th	6th	→
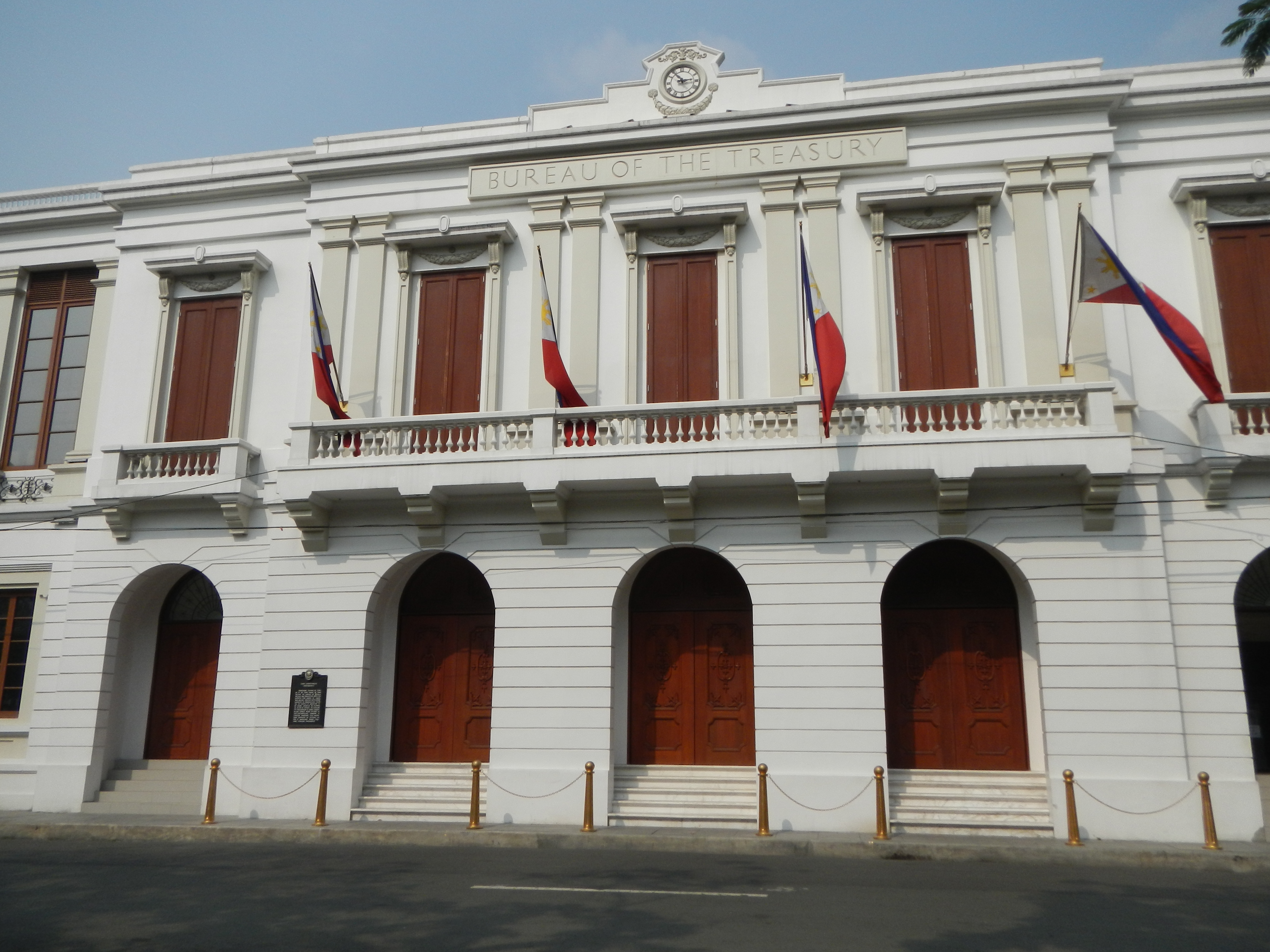
- Ayuntamiento de Manila (2014)

Overview
- Term: July 21, 1919 – March 14, 1922
- Governor-General: Francis Burton Harrison (until March 5, 1921); Charles Yeater (acting, March 5 – October 14, 1921); Leonard Wood (from October 14, 1921)

Senate
- Members: 24
- President: Manuel L. Quezon
- President pro tempore: Espiridion Guanco
- Majority leader: Francisco Enage

House of Representatives
- Members: 91
- Speaker: Sergio Osmeña
- Majority leader: Rafael Alunan

The 5th Philippine Legislature was the meeting of the legislature of the Philippines under the sovereign control of the United States from 1919 to 1922.

== Sessions ==
- First Special Session: July 21 – 26, 1919
- First Regular Session: October 16, 1919 – February 9, 1920
- Second Special Session: February 25 – March 6, 1920
- Second Regular Session: October 16, 1920 – February 9, 1921
- Third Regular Session: October 16, 1921 – February 9, 1922
- Third Special Session: February 13 – March 14, 1922

== Party summary ==
Senate membership

Beginning of the Legislature

End of the Legislature

=== Senate ===
	Party (shading shows control)				Total	Vacant
	Nacionalista	Progresista	Democrata	Independent	Total	Vacant
End of previous legislature	22	1	0	1	24	0
Begin	21	1	1	1	24	0
End	19	2	1	1	23	1
Final voting share	79.2%	8.3%	4.2%	4.2%		
Beginning of next legislature	16 (Note: At the start of the 6th Philippine Legislature, the Nacionalista Party was split into the Colectivista faction which had 10 seats, and the Unipersonalista faction which had six seats.)	0	7	1	24	0

=== House of Representatives ===
Composition of the House of Representatives during the 5th Legislature.

	Party (shading shows control)					Total	Vacant
	Nacionalista	Progresista	Democrata	Liga Popular	Independent	Total	Vacant
End of previous legislature	68	13	3	1	5	90	0
Begin	79	1	5	0	6	91	0
End	79	1	5	0	6	91	0
Final voting share	86.8%	1.1%	5.5%	—N/a	6.6%		
Beginning of next legislature	58 (Note: At the start of the 6th Philippine Legislature, the Nacionalista Party was split into the Colectivista faction which had 27 seats, and the Unipersonalista faction which had 31 seats.)	0	29	0	6	93	0

== Leadership ==
=== Senate ===
Senate President

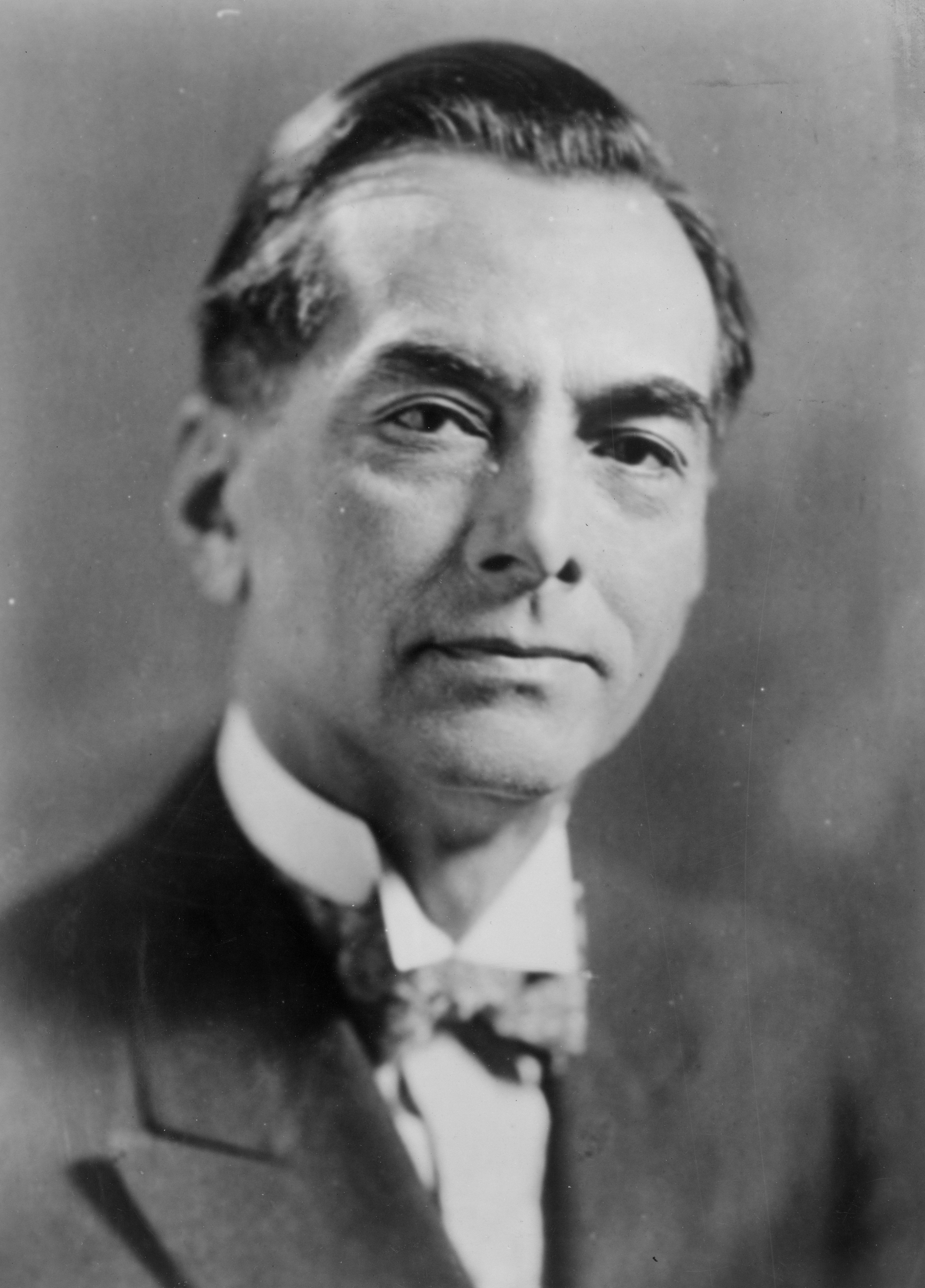
Manuel L. Quezon

- President: Manuel L. Quezon (5th District, Nacionalista)
- President pro tempore: Espiridion Guanco (8th District, Nacionalista)
- Majority Floor Leader: Francisco Enage (9th District, Nacionalista)

=== House of Representatives ===
House Speaker

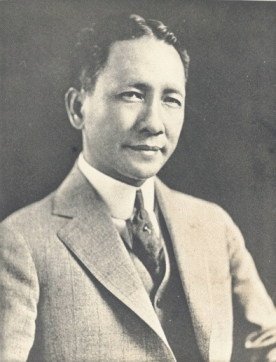
Sergio Osmeña

- Speaker: Sergio Osmeña (Cebu–2nd, Nacionalista)
- Majority Floor Leader: Rafael Alunan (Negros Occidental–3rd, Nacionalista)

== Members ==
=== Senate ===
The following are the terms of the elected senators of this Legislature, according to the date of election:

- For senators elected on October 3, 1916: October 16, 1916 – June 6, 1922
- For senators elected on June 3, 1919: June 3, 1919 – June 2, 1925

Senators of the 12th District were appointed for indefinite terms.

District	Term end	Senator	Party
1st District	1922	Vicente Singson Encarnacion	Progresista
1st District	1925	Santiago Fonacier	Nacionalista
2nd District	1922	Pedro Maria Sison	Nacionalista
2nd District	1925	Bernabe de Guzman	Nacionalista
3rd District	1922	Ceferino de Leon (Note: Ceferino de Leon was elected on October 25, 1919, to succeed Francisco Tongio Liongson, who died on February 20, 1919.)	Nacionalista
3rd District	1925	Teodoro Sandiko	Democrata
4th District	1922	Rafael Palma	Nacionalista
4th District	1925	Pedro Guevara	Nacionalista
5th District	1922	Manuel L. Quezon	Nacionalista
5th District	1925	Antero Soriano	Independent
6th District	1922	Leoncio Imperial	Nacionalista
6th District	1925	Vicente de Vera	Nacionalista
7th District	1922	Jose Altavas	Nacionalista
7th District	1925	Jose Maria Arroyo	Nacionalista
8th District	1922	Espiridion Guanco	Nacionalista
8th District	1925	Hermenegildo Villanueva	Nacionalista
9th District	1922	Esteban Singson	Nacionalista
9th District	1925	Francisco Enage	Nacionalista
10th District	1922	Filemon Sotto	Nacionalista
10th District	1925	Celestino Rodriguez	Nacionalista
11th District	1922	Jose Clarin	Nacionalista
11th District	1925	Francisco Soriano	Nacionalista
12th District	—	Hadji Butu (Note: Hadji Butu was an appointed senator who resigned on November 15, 1920.)	Nacionalista
12th District	—	Teofisto Guingona Sr. (Note: Teofisto Guingona Sr. was appointed on November 15, 1920, to succeed Hadji Butu.)	Progresista
12th District	—	Joaquin Luna (Note: Joaquin Luna was an appointed senator who resigned on July 1, 1920.)	Nacionalista
12th District	—	Lope K. Santos (Note: Lope K. Santos was appointed on July 1, 1920, to succeed Joaquin Luna. He later resigned on November 15, 1921.)	Nacionalista

=== House of Representatives ===
Province/City	District	Representative	Party
Abra	Lone	Eustaquio Purugganan	Nacionalista
Albay	1st	Agapito Buenconsejo	Nacionalista
Albay	2nd	Pedro Martinez Jimeno	Nacionalista
Albay	3rd	Mariano Ope Marbella	Nacionalista
Antique	Lone	Ramon Maza	Nacionalista
Bataan	Lone	Maximino de los Reyes	Nacionalista
Batanes	Lone	Claudio Castillejos	Nacionalista
Batangas	1st	Vicente Lontok	Nacionalista
Batangas	2nd	Vicente Agregado	Nacionalista
Batangas	3rd	Claro M. Recto	Democrata
Bohol	1st	Celestino Gallares	Nacionalista
Bohol	2nd	Macario Lumain	Nacionalista
Bohol	3rd	Filomeno Orbeta Caseñas	Nacionalista
Bulacan	1st	Jose Padilla Sr.	Democrata
Bulacan	2nd	Cirilo B. Santos	Nacionalista
Cagayan	1st	Miguel Concepcion Nava	Nacionalista
Cagayan	2nd	Bonifacio Cortez	Nacionalista
Camarines Norte	Lone	Gabriel Hernandez	Nacionalista
Camarines Sur	1st	Silverio D. Cecilio	Nacionalista
Camarines Sur	2nd	Honesto P. Obias	Democrata
Capiz	1st	Antonio Habana	Nacionalista
Capiz	2nd	Jose A. Orquiola	Nacionalista
Capiz	3rd	Eufrosino Alba (Note: Eufrosino Alba was removed on February 9, 1921 after an electoral protest.)	Nacionalista
Capiz	3rd	Gregorio Pastrana (Note: Gregorio Pastrana replaced Eufrosino Alba on February 9, 1921, after winning an electoral protest.)	Nacionalista
Cavite	Lone	Emilio F. Virata	Nacionalista
Cebu	1st	Manuel Briones	Nacionalista
Cebu	2nd	Sergio Osmeña	Nacionalista
Cebu	3rd	Vicente Urgello	Nacionalista
Cebu	4th	Isidoro Aldanese	Nacionalista
Cebu	5th	Mariano Jesus Cuenco	Nacionalista
Cebu	6th	Miguel Raffiñan	Nacionalista
Cebu	7th	Jose Alonso	Nacionalista
Ilocos Norte	1st	Vicente T. Llanes	Nacionalista
Ilocos Norte	2nd	Faustino Adiarte	Nacionalista
Ilocos Sur	1st	Elpidio Quirino	Nacionalista
Ilocos Sur	2nd	Ponciano Morales	Nacionalista
Iloilo	1st	Jose Evangelista	Nacionalista
Iloilo	2nd	Cresenciano Lozano	Nacionalista
Iloilo	3rd	Jose E. Locsin	Nacionalista
Iloilo	4th	Daniel Evangelista	Nacionalista
Iloilo	5th	Victoriano M. Salcedo	Nacionalista
Isabela	Lone	Miguel Binag	Nacionalista
La Union	1st	Juan T. Lucero	Nacionalista
La Union	2nd	Felipe C. Diaz	Nacionalista
Laguna	1st	Vicente Ocampo	Nacionalista
Laguna	2nd	Eulogio Benitez	Nacionalista
Leyte	1st	Francisco Enage	Nacionalista
Leyte	2nd	Ciriaco K. Kangleon	Nacionalista
Leyte	3rd	Julio Siayangko	Independent
Leyte	4th	Ruperto Kapunan	Nacionalista
Manila	1st	Juan Nolasco	Nacionalista
Manila	2nd	Jose Generoso	Democrata
Mindanao and Sulu	Lone	Pablo Lorenzo (Note: Appointed.)	Nacionalista
Mindanao and Sulu	Lone	Teodoro Palma Gil	Nacionalista
Mindanao and Sulu	Lone	Datu Piang	Independent
Mindanao and Sulu	Lone	Julius Schuck	Independent
Mindanao and Sulu	Lone	Datu Tampugaw	Independent
Mindoro	Lone	Mariano P. Leuterio	Nacionalista
Misamis	1st	Jose Artadi	Nacionalista
Misamis	2nd	Fortunato U. Clavano	Independent
Mountain Province	Lone	Pedro Aunario	Nacionalista
Mountain Province	Lone	Rafael Bulayungan	Nacionalista
Mountain Province	Lone	Juan Cariño	Nacionalista
Negros Occidental	1st	Lope B. Severino	Nacionalista
Negros Occidental	2nd	Rafael R. Alunan	Nacionalista
Negros Occidental	3rd	Tito Silverio	Nacionalista
Negros Oriental	1st	Restituto Villegas	Progresista
Negros Oriental	2nd	Pedro Teves	Nacionalista
Nueva Ecija	Lone	Gaudencio Medina	Nacionalista
Nueva Vizcaya	Lone	Evaristo Pañganiban	Independent
Palawan	Lone	Roman de Jesus	Nacionalista
Pampanga	1st	Pablo Angeles David	Nacionalista
Pampanga	2nd	Pedro Abad Santos	Nacionalista
Pangasinan	1st	Antonio Bengson	Nacionalista
Pangasinan	2nd	Alejandro de Guzman	Nacionalista
Pangasinan	3rd	Raymundo O. Camacho	Nacionalista
Pangasinan	4th	Alejandro R. Mendoza	Nacionalista
Pangasinan	5th	Ricardo Gonzales	Nacionalista
Rizal	1st	Agapito Ignacio	Nacionalista
Rizal	2nd	Mariano Melendres	Democrata
Romblon	Lone	Leonardo Festin	Nacionalista
Samar	1st	Pedro K. Mendiola	Nacionalista
Samar	2nd	Pastor Salazar	Nacionalista
Samar	3rd	Jose Lugay Raquel	Nacionalista
Sorsogon	1st	Leoncio Grajo	Nacionalista
Sorsogon	2nd	Pablo de la Rosa	Nacionalista
Surigao	Lone	Eusebio Tiongko	Nacionalista
Tarlac	1st	Luis Morales	Nacionalista
Tarlac	2nd	Benigno Aquino Sr.	Nacionalista
Tayabas	1st	Fabian R. Millar	Nacionalista
Tayabas	2nd	Ricardo Paras	Nacionalista
Zambales	Lone	Guillermo Pablo	Nacionalista

== Changes in membership ==
=== Senate ===
District	Incumbent				Special election	Successor		
District	Senator	Party	Date	Reason	Special election	Senator	Party	Date
12th District	Joaquin Luna	Nacionalista	July 1, 1920	Resigned	July 1, 1920	Lope K. Santos	Nacionalista	July 1, 1920
12th District	Hadji Butu	Nacionalista	November 15, 1920	Resigned	November 15, 1920	Teofisto Guingona Sr.	Progresista	November 15, 1920

=== House of Representatives ===
District	Incumbent				Special election	Successor		
District	Member	Party	Date	Reason	Special election	Member	Party	Date
Capiz–3rd	Eufrosino Alba	Nacionalista	February 9, 1921	Removed after an electoral protest	—N/a	Gregorio Pastrana	Nacionalista	February 9, 1921

== See also ==
- 1919 Philippine legislative election
  - 1919 Philippine Senate elections
  - 1919 Philippine House of Representatives elections
