= 4th Philippine Legislature =

6th legislative term of the Philippines

←	3rd	5th	→
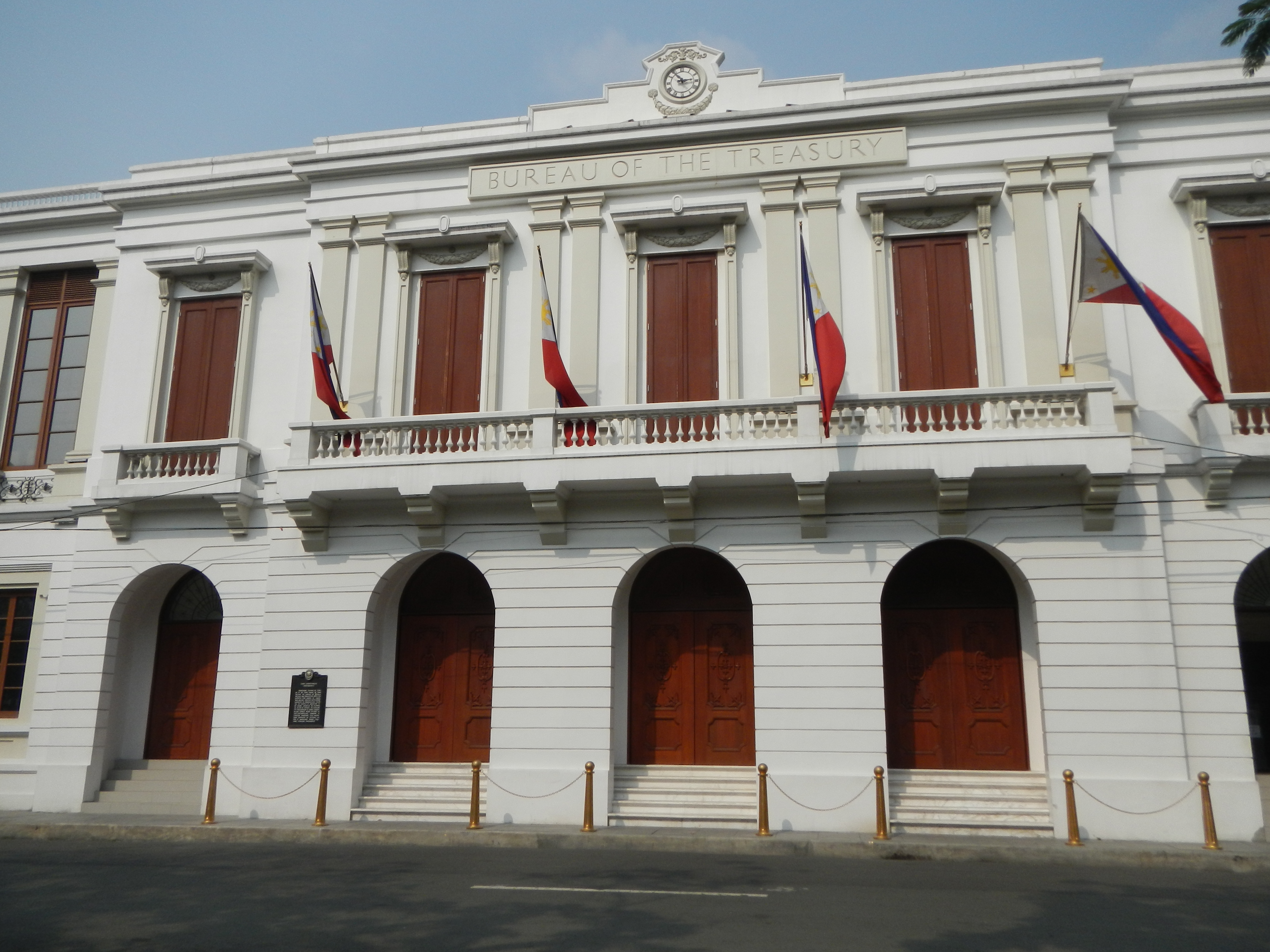
- Ayuntamiento de Manila (2014)

Overview
- Term: October 16, 1916 – March 8, 1919
- Governor-General: Francis Burton Harrison

Senate
- Members: 24
- President: Manuel L. Quezon
- President pro tempore: Rafael Palma (until c. 1919) (Note: It is unclear when Rafael Palma's tenure as president pro tempore ended. One source states that Espiridion Guanco had been serving as president pro tempore as early as March 1919, during the 4th Legislature. In one of his own accounts, Palma stated that he was still serving as president pro tempore in 1921.); Espiridion Guanco (from c. 1919)
- Majority leader: Francisco Felipe Villanueva

House of Representatives
- Members: 90
- Speaker: Sergio Osmeña
- Majority leader: Rafael Alunan

The 4th Philippine Legislature was the meeting of the legislature of the Philippine Islands under the sovereign control of the United States from October 16, 1916, to March 8, 1919.

== Sessions ==
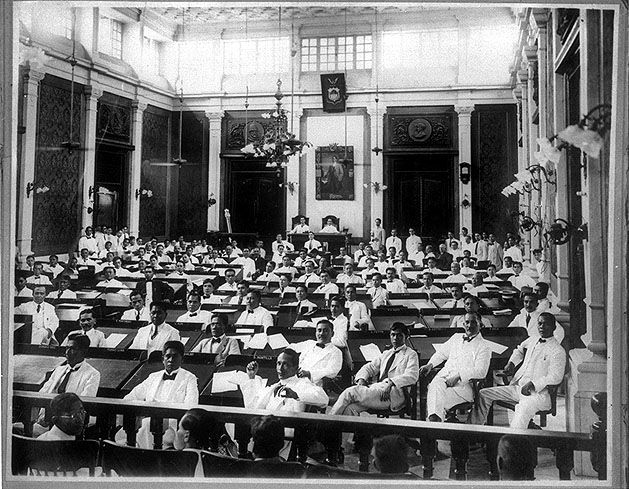
Joint session of Philippine Legislature, Manila. November 15, 1916

- First Regular Session: October 16, 1916 – February 8, 1917
- First Special Session: February 12 – 22, 1917
- Second Regular Session: October 16, 1917 – February 8, 1918
- Second Special Session: September 30 – October 2, 1918
- Third Regular Session: October 7, 1918 – February 8, 1919
- Third Special Session: March 1 – 8, 1919

== Legislation ==
The Fourth Philippine Legislature passed a total of 204 laws (Act Nos. 2665 – 2868).

== Party summary ==
=== Senate ===
Composition of the Senate during the 4th Legislature.

	Party (shading shows control)				Total	Vacant
	Nacionalista	Progresista	Democrata	Independent	Total	Vacant
Begin	22	1	—N/a	1	24	0
End	22	1	—N/a	1	24	0
Final voting share	91.7%	4.2%	—N/a	4.2%		
Beginning of next legislature	21	1	1	1	24	0

=== House of Representatives ===
Composition of the House of Representatives during the 4th Legislature.

	Party (shading shows control)					Total	Vacant
	Nacionalista	Progresista	Democrata	Liga Popular	Independent	Total	Vacant
End of previous legislature	54	19	0	2	5	80	1
Begin	68	13	3	1	5	90	0
End	68	13	3	1	5	90	0
Final voting share	75.6%	14.4%	3.3%	1.1%	5.6%		
Beginning of next legislature	79	1	5	0	6	91	0

== Leadership ==
=== Senate ===
Senate President

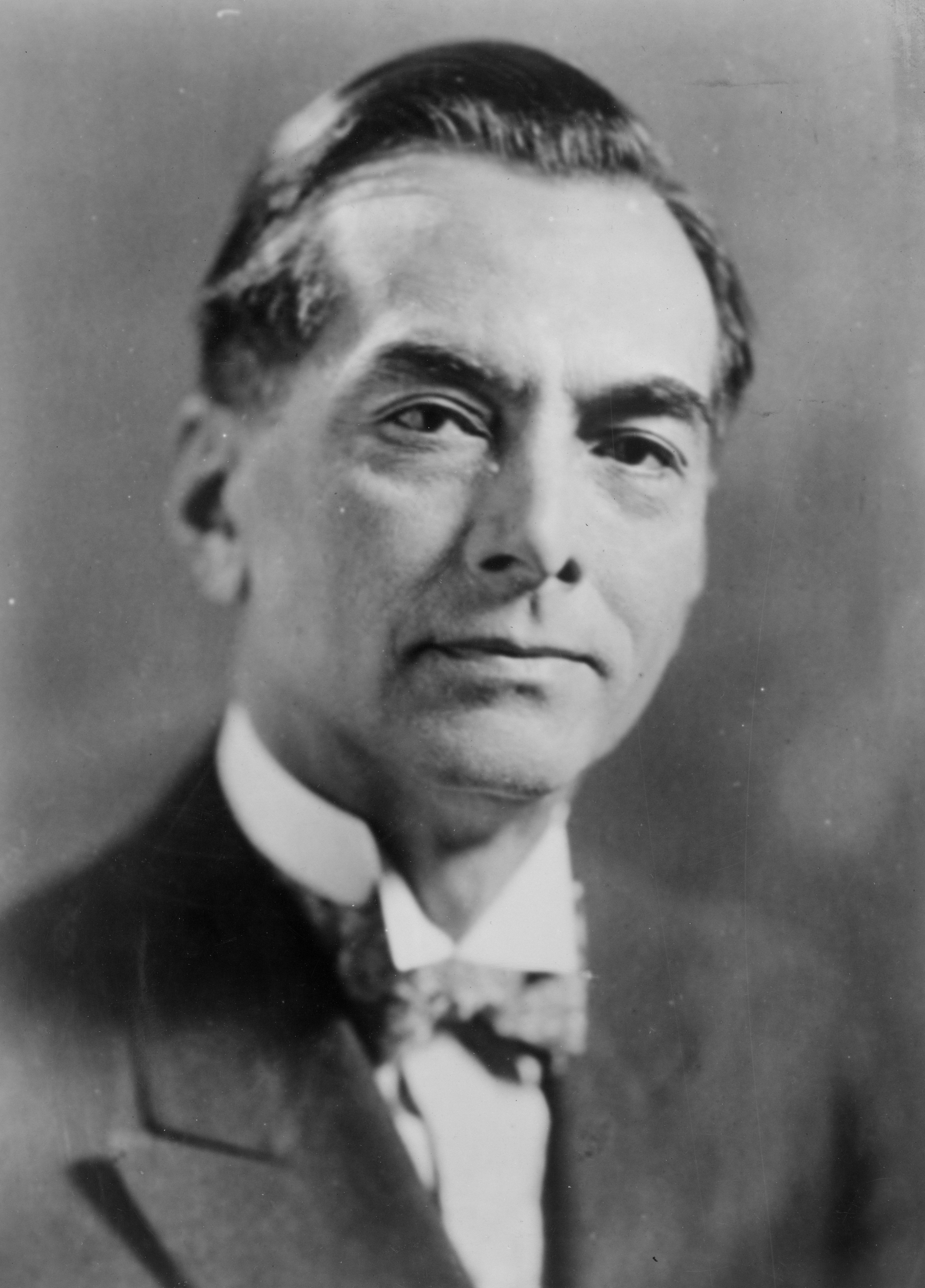
Manuel L. Quezon

- President: Manuel L. Quezon (5th District, Nacionalista)
- President pro tempore:
  - Rafael Palma (4th District, Nacionalista), until c. 1919
  - Espiridion Guanco (8th District, Nacionalista), from c. 1919
- Majority Floor Leader: Francisco Felipe Viillanueva (7th District, Nacionalista)

=== House of Representatives ===
House Speaker

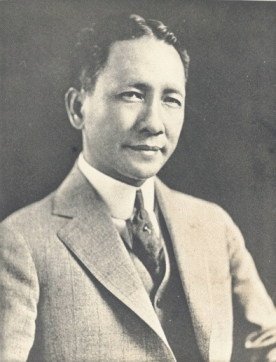
Sergio Osmeña

- Speaker: Sergio Osmeña (Cebu–2nd, Nacionalista)
- Majority Floor Leader: Rafael Alunan (Negros Occidental–3rd, Nacionalista)

== Members ==
=== Senate ===
Senators of this Legislature were elected on October 3, 1916 for the following terms, according to their ranking in their senatorial districts:

- For first ranking senators: October 16, 1916 – June 6, 1922
- For second ranking senators: October 16, 1916 – June 3, 1919

Senators of the 12th District were appointed for indefinite terms.

District	Term end	Senator	Party
1st District	1922	Vicente Singson Encarnacion	Progresista
1st District	1919	Juan Villamor	Nacionalista
2nd District	1922	Pedro Maria Sison	Nacionalista
2nd District	1919	Aquilino Calvo (Note: Aquilino Calvo was appointed as Governor of Mountain Province on February 20, 1917.)	Nacionalista
2nd District	1919	Matias Gonzales (Note: Matias Gonzales was elected on May 5, 1917, to succeed Aquilino Calvo.)	Nacionalista
3rd District	1922	Francisco Tongio Liongson (Note: Francisco Tongio Liongson died on February 20, 1919.)	Nacionalista
3rd District	1919	Isauro Gabaldon	Nacionalista
4th District	1922	Rafael Palma	Nacionalista
4th District	1919	Pedro Guevara	Nacionalista
5th District	1922	Manuel L. Quezon	Nacionalista
5th District	1919	Vicente Ilustre	Independent
6th District	1922	Leoncio Imperial (Note: Leoncio Imperial was elected on May 5, 1917, after José Fuentebella's election was annulled.)	Nacionalista
6th District	1919	Mario Guariña (Note: Mario Guariña was elected on May 5, 1917, after Tomas Arejola's election was annulled.)	Nacionalista
7th District	1922	Jose Altavas	Nacionalista
7th District	1919	Francisco Felipe Villanueva	Nacionalista
8th District	1922	Espiridion Guanco	Nacionalista
8th District	1919	Manuel Lopez	Nacionalista
9th District	1922	Esteban Singson	Nacionalista
9th District	1919	Jose Maria Veloso	Nacionalista
10th District	1922	Filemon Sotto	Nacionalista
10th District	1919	Celestino Rodriguez	Nacionalista
11th District	1922	Jose Clarin	Nacionalista
11th District	1919	Nicolas Capistrano	Nacionalista
12th District	—	Hadji Butu (Note: Appointed.)	Nacionalista
12th District	—	Joaquin Luna	Nacionalista

=== House of Representatives ===
Province/City	District	Representative	Party
Abra	Lone (Note: Abra's lone district was created from Ilocos Sur's 3rd district on March 9, 1917.)	Eustaquio Purugganan (Note: Eustaquio Purugganan was redistricted from Ilocos Sur's 3rd district on March 9, 1917.)	Nacionalista
Albay	1st	Domingo Diaz	Nacionalista
Albay	2nd	Jose O. Vera	Nacionalista
Albay	3rd	Tomas Luna	Progresista
Ambos Camarines	1st	Gonzalo S. Escalante	Nacionalista
Ambos Camarines	2nd	Manuel Rey	Nacionalista
Ambos Camarines	3rd	Sulpicio V. Cea	Nacionalista
Antique	Lone	Ramon Maza	Nacionalista
Bataan	Lone	Maximino de los Reyes	Nacionalista
Batanes	Lone	Juan G. Castillejos	Nacionalista
Batangas	1st	Ramon Diokno	Nacionalista
Batangas	2nd	Pablo Borbon	Nacionalista
Batangas	3rd	Benito Reyes Katigbak	Nacionalista
Bohol	1st	Celestino Gallares	Nacionalista
Bohol	2nd	Macario Lumain	Nacionalista
Bohol	3rd	Filomeno Orbeta Caseñas	Nacionalista
Bulacan	1st	Mariano Escueta	Liga Popular
Bulacan	2nd	Ricardo Gonzales Lloret	Nacionalista
Cagayan	1st	Vicente T. Fernandez	Nacionalista
Cagayan	2nd	Miguel Concepcion Nava	Nacionalista
Capiz	1st	Antonio Belo	Nacionalista
Capiz	2nd	Leopoldo Mobo Alba	Nacionalista
Capiz	3rd	Leonardo Festin	Progresista
Cavite	Lone	Emiliano Tria Tirona	Democrata
Cebu	1st	Jose Hernaez	Nacionalista
Cebu	2nd	Sergio Osmeña	Nacionalista
Cebu	3rd	Vicente Urgello	Nacionalista
Cebu	4th	Alejandro Ruiz	Nacionalista
Cebu	5th	Mariano Jesus Cuenco	Nacionalista
Cebu	6th	Miguel Raffiñan	Nacionalista
Cebu	7th	Tomas N. Alonso	Nacionalista
Ilocos Norte	1st	Vicente T. Llanes	Nacionalista
Ilocos Norte	2nd	Melchor Flor	Progresista
Ilocos Sur	1st	Alberto Reyes	Progresista
Ilocos Sur	2nd	Ponciano Morales	Nacionalista
Ilocos Sur	3rd (Note: Ilocos Sur's 3rd district was dissolved into Abra's lone district and Ilocos Sur's 2nd district on March 9, 1917.)	Eustaquio Purugganan (Note: Eustaquio Purugganan was redistricted on March 9, 1917 to Abra's lone district.)	Nacionalista
Iloilo	1st	Jose Maria Arroyo	Nacionalista
Iloilo	2nd	Cresenciano Lozano	Nacionalista
Iloilo	3rd	Nicanor Gregorius	Progresista
Iloilo	4th	Tiburcio Lutero	Progresista
Iloilo	5th	Juan de Leon	Progresista
Isabela	Lone	Mauro Verzosa	Nacionalista
La Laguna	1st	Feliciano Gomez	Nacionalista
La Laguna	2nd	Crisanto M. Guysayko	Nacionalista
La Union	1st	Juan T. Lucero	Nacionalista
La Union	2nd	Valerio M. Fontanilla	Independent
Leyte	1st	Manuel Veloso	Nacionalista
Leyte	2nd	Dalmacio Costas	Nacionalista
Leyte	3rd	Segundo Apostol	Nacionalista
Leyte	4th	Ruperto Kapunan	Progresista
Manila	1st	Antonio Montenegro	Democrata
Manila	2nd	Luciano de la Rosa	Democrata
Mindanao and Sulu	Lone	Rafael Acuña	Nacionalista
Mindanao and Sulu	Lone	Datu Benito	Independent
Mindanao and Sulu	Lone	Pablo Lorenzo	Nacionalista
Mindanao and Sulu	Lone	Teodoro Palma Gil	Nacionalista
Mindanao and Sulu	Lone	Datu Piang	Independent
Mindoro	Lone	Mariano P. Leuterio	Nacionalista
Misamis	1st	Gregorio Borromeo	Nacionalista
Misamis	2nd	Ramon Neri	Nacionalista
Mountain Province	Lone	Rafael Bulayungan	Nacionalista
Mountain Province	Lone	Juan Cariño	Nacionalista
Mountain Province	Lone	Valentin Manglapus	Nacionalista
Negros Occidental	1st	Lope B. Severino	Nacionalista
Negros Occidental	2nd	Rafael R. Alunan	Nacionalista
Negros Occidental	3rd	Gil Montilla	Nacionalista
Negros Oriental	1st	Restituto Villegas	Progresista
Negros Oriental	2nd	Felipe Tayko	Progresista
Nueva Ecija	Lone	Isidro Gonzales	Nacionalista
Nueva Vizcaya	Lone	Wenceslao Valera	Nacionalista
Palawan	Lone	Manuel Sandoval	Nacionalista
Pampanga	1st	Eduardo Gutierrez David	Progresista
Pampanga	2nd	Pedro Abad Santos	Nacionalista
Pangasinan	1st	Modesto Sison	Progresista
Pangasinan	2nd	Aquilino Banaag	Nacionalista
Pangasinan	3rd	Teodoro I. Gomez	Nacionalista
Pangasinan	4th	Alejandro de Guzman	Nacionalista
Pangasinan	5th	Bernabe de Guzman	Nacionalista
Rizal	1st	Arcadio Santos	Nacionalista
Rizal	2nd	Eugenio Santos	Progresista
Samar	1st	Pedro K. Mendiola	Nacionalista
Samar	2nd	Pastor Salazar	Nacionalista
Samar	3rd	Jose Lugay Raquel	Nacionalista
Sorsogon	1st	Manuel Escudero	Independent
Sorsogon	2nd	Amancio Aguilar	Nacionalista
Surigao	Lone	Eusebio Tiongko	Nacionalista
Tarlac	1st	Luis Morales	Nacionalista
Tarlac	2nd	Cayetano Rivera	Independent
Tayabas	1st	Alfonso M. Recto	Nacionalista
Tayabas	2nd	Gregorio Nieva	Nacionalista
Zambales	Lone	Guillermo Pablo	Nacionalista

== Changes in membership ==
=== Senate ===
District	Incumbent				Special election	Successor		
District	Senator	Party	Date	Reason	Special election	Senator	Party	Date
2nd District	Aquilino Calvo	Nacionalista	February 20, 1917	Appointed as Governor of Mountain Province	May 5, 1917	Matias Gonzales	Nacionalista	May 5, 1917
3rd District	Francisco Tongio Liongson	Nacionalista	February 20, 1919	Died in office	—N/a			
6th District	José Fuentebella	Nacionalista	—N/a	Election annulled	May 5, 1917	Leoncio Imperial	Nacionalista	May 5, 1917
6th District	Tomas Arejola	Nacionalista	—N/a	Election annulled	May 5, 1917	Mario Guariña	Nacionalista	May 5, 1917

== See also ==
- 1916 Philippine Senate elections
- 1916 Philippine Assembly elections
