= Ambos Camarines's 2nd congressional district =

Legislative district of the Philippines

Ambos Camarines's 2nd congressional district is a defunct congressional district that encompassed the southern and central portions of the former province of Ambos Camarines including its capital Nueva Cáceres. It was represented in the Philippine Assembly from 1907 to 1916 and in the House of Representatives of the Philippine Islands from 1916 to 1919. The Spanish colonial province of Ambos Camarines was reorganized under the Insular Government of the Philippine Islands on April 27, 1901 and was divided into three districts. Manuel Rey was elected as this district's first representative in 1907. Following its repartition into Camarines Norte and Camarines Sur on March 3, 1919, the district was abolished with most of its territory having been absorbed by Camarines Sur's 1st congressional district.

== Representation history ==
#	Image	Member	Term of office		Legislature	Party	Electoral history	Constituent LGUs
#	Image	Member	Start	End	Legislature	Party	Electoral history	Constituent LGUs
=== Ambos Camarines's 2nd district for the Philippine Assembly ===
District created January 9, 1907.
1		Manuel Rey	October 16, 1907	October 16, 1909	1st	Nacionalista	Elected in 1907.	1907–1909; Baao, Bato, Bula, Calabanga, Iriga, Magarao, Nabua, Nueva Cáceres, Pili
2		Fulgencio Contreras	October 16, 1909	October 16, 1912	2nd	Progresista	Elected in 1909.	1909–1916; Baao, Bato, Bula, Calabanga, Camaligan, Canaman, Iriga, Magarao, Nabua, Nueva Cáceres, Pili
3		Julián Ocampo	October 16, 1912	October 16, 1916	3rd	Nacionalista	Elected in 1912.	1909–1916; Baao, Bato, Bula, Calabanga, Camaligan, Canaman, Iriga, Magarao, Nabua, Nueva Cáceres, Pili
=== Ambos Camarines's 2nd district for the House of Representatives of the Philippine Islands ===
(1)		Manuel Rey	October 16, 1916	June 3, 1919	4th	Nacionalista	Elected in 1916.	1916–1919; Baao, Bato, Bula, Calabanga, Camaligan, Canaman, Iriga, Magarao, Nabua, Nueva Cáceres, Pili
District dissolved into Camarines Sur's 1st and 2nd district.

== See also ==
- Legislative districts of Camarines Norte
- Legislative districts of Camarines Sur
