= Carlos A. Imperial =

Filipino lawyer and politician

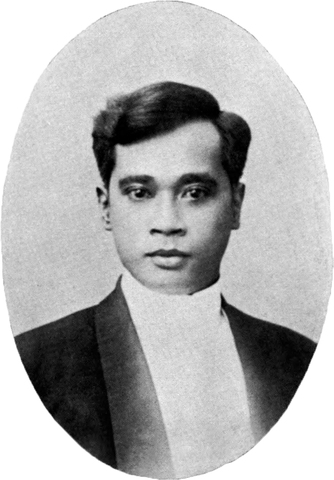
- Photograph from Album Histórico de la Primera Asamblea Filipina, 1908

Member of the Philippine Assembly from Albay's 2nd district
- In office October 16, 1907 – October 16, 1909
- Preceded by: District established
- Succeeded by: Silvino Brimbuela

Personal details
- Born: November 4, 1879 Daraga, Albay, Captaincy General of the Philippines
- Died: May 20, 1941 (aged 61)
- Party: Progresista
- Education: Colegio de San Juan de Letran

Carlos A. Imperial y Duran (November 4, 1879 – May 20, 1941) was a Filipino lawyer and politician who served as the representative for Albay's 2nd district in the Philippine Assembly from 1907 until 1909. He was a member of the Progresista Party.

== Life and career ==
Imperial was born on November 4, 1879, in Daraga, Albay. He received his primary education in Nueva Caceres, Ambos Camarines, and completed his secondary education at Colegio San Juan de Letran in Manila. He was admitted to the Philippine bar by the Supreme Court in September 1903 and was one of the members of the law firm Leoncio and Carlos A. Imperial, Attorneys at Law, which maintained offices in Ambos Camarines, Albay, and Sorsogon.

In July 1907, he was elected to the Philippine Assembly, representing Albay's 2nd district. He served in the 1st Philippine Legislature until 1909.

He is the brother of former Philippine senator Leoncio Imperial.

House of Representatives of the Philippines
New district	Member of the Philippine Assembly for Albay's 2nd district 1907–1909	Succeeded by Silvino Brimbuela
