= 1916 Philippine Senate elections =

First Filipino Senate Elections

1916 Philippine Senate election
- October 3, 1916

22 (of the 24) seats in the Philippine Senate
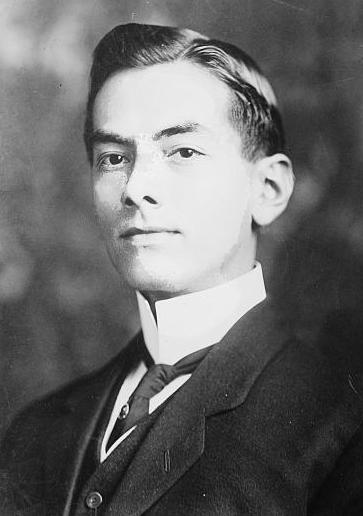

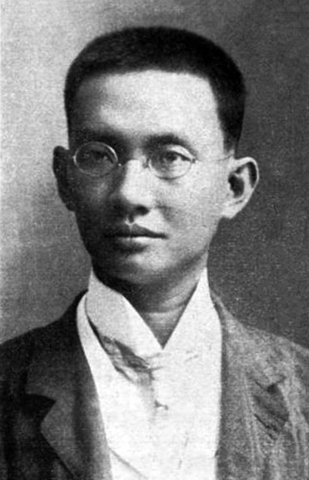
| | Majority party | Minority party |
|---|---|---|
| Leader | Manuel L. Quezon | Vicente Singson Encarnacion |
| Party | Nacionalista | Progresista |
| Leader's seat | 5th District | 1st District |
| Seats won | 20 | 1 |
- Election results; each district sent in two seats to the Senate. 2 Nacionalistas 1 Nacionalista and 1 Progresista 1 Nacionalista and 1 independent
Senate President before election
None (This was the first Philippine Senate election)
Elected Senate President
Manuel L. Quezon
Nacionalista

The first elections to Philippine Senate were held on October 3, 1916, immediately after the passage of the Philippine Autonomy Act, known as the Jones Law. The Act created the Senate of the Philippines. The Senate replaced the Philippine Commission as the upper house of the Philippine Legislature, thus creating for the first time a fully elected national legislative branch in the Philippines, under the American colonial Insular Government. Each district elected two senators (plurality-at-large): The first-placer was to serve a six-year term while the second-placer was to serve a three-year term. On each election thereafter, one seat per district was up (first past the post). The senators from the 12th district were appointed by the American governor-general for no fixed term.

== Results ==
↓

| 22 | 1 | 1 |
| Nacionalista | P | I |

Note: In this election, the first placer will serve for six (6) years, while the listed second placer will serve for three (3) years. Subsequent elections were held every three (3) years to replace the outgoing senator(s).

=== Philippines's 1st senatorial district ===
| Candidate | Party | Votes | % |
|---|---|---|---|
| Vicente Singson Encarnacion | Partido Nacional Progresista | 57,036 | 54.52 |
| Juan Villamor | Partido Nacionalista | 21,349 | 20.41 |
| Irineo Javier | Partido Nacional Progresista | 11,055 | 10.57 |
| Santiago Fonacier | Partido Nacionalista | 8,951 | 8.56 |
| Cresenciano Masigan | Partido Nacional Progresista | 6,229 | 5.95 |
| Total | | 104,620 | 100.00 |
| Total votes | | 104,620 | – |

=== Philippines's 2nd senatorial district ===
| Candidate | Party | Votes | % |
|---|---|---|---|
| Pedro Maria Sison | Partido Nacionalista | 17,814 | 26.13 |
| Aquilino Calvo | Partido Nacionalista | 15,382 | 22.56 |
| Asterio Favis | Partido Nacional Progresista | 13,398 | 19.65 |
| Joaquin Baltazar | Partido Nacional Progresista | 12,534 | 18.38 |
| Juan Alvear | Partido Nacionalista | 8,613 | 12.63 |
| Others | | 441 | 0.65 |
| Total | | 68,182 | 100.00 |
| Total votes | | 68,182 | – |

=== Philippines's 3rd senatorial district ===
| Candidate | Party | Votes | % |
|---|---|---|---|
| Francisco Tongio Liongson | Partido Nacionalista | 16,840 | 27.59 |
| Isauro Gabaldon | Partido Nacionalista | 16,566 | 27.14 |
| Mariano Lim | Partido Nacional Progresista | 13,085 | 21.44 |
| Jose Alejandrino | Partido Nacional Progresista | 12,499 | 20.48 |
| Jose Espinosa | Independent | 2,051 | 3.36 |
| Total | | 61,041 | 100.00 |
| Total votes | | 61,041 | – |

=== Philippines's 4th senatorial district ===
| Candidate | Party | Votes | % |
|---|---|---|---|
| Rafael Palma | Partido Nacionalista | 19,074 | 25.79 |
| Pedro Guevara | Partido Nacionalista | 16,642 | 22.50 |
| Teodoro Sandiko | Partido Nacional Progresista | 15,777 | 21.33 |
| Gregorio Araneta | Partido Nacional Progresista | 14,120 | 19.09 |
| Isabelo de los Reyes | Bloque Obrerista Nacionalista | 6,093 | 8.24 |
| Arsenio Cruz Herrera | Bloque Obrerista Nacionalista | 1,568 | 2.12 |
| Manuel Ramirez | Partido Union Reformista | 421 | 0.57 |
| Ramon R. Papa | Partido Union Reformista | 266 | 0.36 |
| Total | | 73,961 | 100.00 |
| Total votes | | 73,961 | – |

=== Philippines's 5th senatorial district ===
| Candidate | Party | Votes | % |
|---|---|---|---|
| Manuel L. Quezon | Partido Nacionalista | 30,554 | 45.36 |
| Vicente Ilustre | Independent | 18,920 | 28.09 |
| Leonardo Osorio | Partido Nacional Progresista | 17,461 | 25.92 |
| Others | | 427 | 0.63 |
| Total | | 67,362 | 100.00 |
| Total votes | | 67,362 | – |

=== Philippines's 6th senatorial district ===
| Candidate | Party | Votes | % |
|---|---|---|---|
| José Fuentebella | Partido Nacionalista | 30,554 | 48.69 |
| Mario Guariña | Partido Nacionalista | 12,223 | 19.48 |
| Tomás Aréjola | Partido Nacionalista | 10,900 | 17.37 |
| Mariano Abella | Partido Nacional Progresista | 10,177 | 16.22 |
| Vicente de Vera | Partido Tercerista | 9,409 | 14.99 |
| Tomas Almonte | Partido Nacional Progresista | 6,007 | 9.57 |
| Total | | 79,270 | 100.00 |
| Total votes | | 62,748 | – |

Note: The results in this district were found as fraudulent. The American Governor General called for a special election in 1917.

=== Philippines's 7th senatorial district ===
| Candidate | Party | Votes | % |
|---|---|---|---|
| Jose Altavas | Partido Nacionalista | 14,740 | 29.50 |
| Francisco Felipe Villanueva | Partido Nacionalista | 14,154 | 28.33 |
| Ruperto Montinola | Partido Nacional Progresista | 11,014 | 22.04 |
| Salvador Laguda | Partido Nacional Progresista | 10,057 | 20.13 |
| Total | | 49,965 | 100.00 |
| Total votes | | 49,965 | – |

=== Philippines's 8th senatorial district ===
| Candidate | Party | Votes | % |
|---|---|---|---|
| Espiridion Guanco | Partido Nacionalista | 15,563 | 39.84 |
| Manuel Lopez | Partido Nacionalista | 10,034 | 25.69 |
| Hermenegildo Villanueva | Partido Nacional Progresista | 6,693 | 17.14 |
| Angel Salazar | Partido Nacional Progresista | 2,305 | 5.90 |
| Antonio Jayme | Partido Tercerista | 2,258 | 5.78 |
| Santos Capadocia | Partido Tercerista | 2,207 | 5.65 |
| Total | | 39,060 | 100.00 |
| Total votes | | 39,060 | – |

=== Philippines's 9th senatorial district ===
| Candidate | Party | Votes | % |
|---|---|---|---|
| Esteban Singson | Partido Nacionalista | 12,538 | 22.39 |
| Jose Maria Veloso | Partido Nacionalista | 10,710 | 19.12 |
| Tomas Gomez | Independent | 8,975 | 16.03 |
| Vicente Jazmines | Partido Nacional Progresista | 6,752 | 12.06 |
| Pastor Navarro | Partido Nacional Progresista | 5,004 | 8.94 |
| Ruperto Kapunan | Independent | 4,751 | 8.48 |
| Luciano Cinco | Partido Nacionalista | 3,668 | 6.55 |
| Quiremon Alquino | Partido Nacionalista | 2,559 | 4.57 |
| Abdon Marchadesch | Partido Nacionalista | 1,047 | 1.87 |
| Total | | 56,004 | 100.00 |
| Total votes | | 56,004 | – |

=== Philippines's 10th senatorial district ===
| Candidate | Party | Votes | % |
|---|---|---|---|
| Filemon Sotto | Partido Nacionalista | 4,925 | 36.79 |
| Celestino Rodriguez | Partido Nacionalista | 4,667 | 34.86 |
| Dionisio Jakosalem | Partido Nacional Progresista | 3,795 | 28.35 |
| Total | | 13,387 | 100.00 |
| Total votes | | 13,387 | – |

=== Philippines's 11th senatorial district ===
| Candidate | Party | Votes | % |
|---|---|---|---|
| Jose Clarin | Partido Nacionalista | 6,171 | 45.01 |
| Nicolas Capistrano | Partido Nacionalista | 3,556 | 25.94 |
| Gabino Sepulveda | Partido Nacional Progresista | 2,253 | 16.43 |
| Troadio Galicano | Partido Nacional Progresista | 1,305 | 9.52 |
| Manuel Corrales | Independent | 425 | 3.10 |
| Total | | 13,710 | 100.00 |
| Total votes | | 13,710 | – |

=== Philippines's 12th senatorial district* ===
| Candidate | Party |
|---|---|
| Hadji Butu | Partido Nacionalista |
| Joaquin Luna | Partido Nacionalista |
Total

- Non-elective positions. Appointed by the American Governor-General

=== Results by party ===
| Party | Seats |
|---|---|
| Nacionalista | 20 |
| Progresista | 1 |
| Independent | 1 |
| Total | 22 |

=== Special elections ===
==== February 1917 special election for Philippines's 6th senatorial district ====
As ordered by the American Governor General as the previous elections conducted in 1916 were found to be fraudulent. The first placer will serve until 1922, while the listed second placer will serve until 1919.

| Candidate | Party | Votes | % |
|---|---|---|---|
| Leoncio Imperial | Partido Nacionalista | 18,744 | 30.17 |
| Mario Guariña | Partido Nacionalista | 16,587 | 26.70 |
| José Fuentebella | Partido Nacionalista | 14,005 | 22.55 |
| Tomás Aréjola | Partido Nacionalista | 12,784 | 20.58 |
| Total | | 62,120 | 100.00 |

==== May 5, 1917 special election for Philippines's 2nd senatorial district ====
To serve the unexpired term of Senator Aquilino Calvo, who resigned on February 1, 1917. The winner will serve until 1922.

| Candidate | Party | Votes | % |
|---|---|---|---|
| Matias Gonzalez | Partido Nacionalista | 8,448 | 59.00 |
| Alejo Mabanag | Partido Nacional Progresista | 5,857 | 40.91 |
| Joaquin Baltazar | Independent | 13 | 0.09 |
| Total | | 14,318 | 100.00 |

== See also ==
- 4th Philippine Legislature
