= List of members of the House of Representatives of the Philippines =

The House of Representatives of the Philippines is the lower house of Congress. The House of Representatives has existed from 1945 to 1972, and since 1987. Whenever a bicameral system is used, a lower house has existed under the name of the Philippine Assembly from 1907 to 1934. When a unicameral system is in use, the sole house of the legislature has been called as the National Assembly from 1935 to 1941 (the Commonwealth National Assembly) and from 1943 to 1944 (the Second Republic National Assembly). When a parliament is in use, they were all in a unicameral setup and were known as the Malolos Congress during the 19th century, and the Batasang Pambansa from 1978 to 1986. All of their members are noted here.

== See also ==
- List of Senators of the Philippines
