= Manuel Rey =

Filipino physician, surgeon and politician

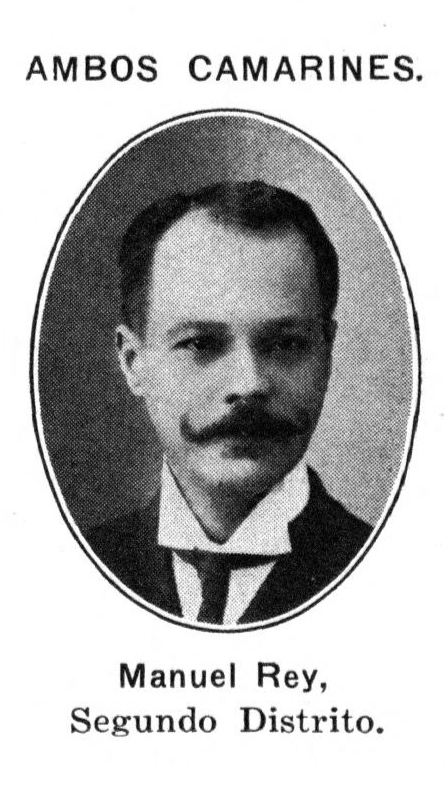
- Rey as member of the Philippine House of Representatives, c. 1917

Member of the Philippine Assembly from Ambos Camarines's 2nd District
- In office 1907–1909
- Preceded by: position established
- Succeeded by: Fulgencio Contreras

Member of the Philippine House of Representatives from Ambos Camarines's 2nd District
- In office 1916–1919
- Preceded by: Julián Ocampo
- Succeeded by: position abolished

Personal details
- Born: November 2, 1868 Cuyo, Palawan, Captaincy General of the Philippines
- Party: Nacionalista
- Education: Colegio de San Juan de Letran (BA); University of Santo Tomas; University of Valladolid (MD)

Manuel Rey y Ponce de León (November 2, 1868 — unknown) was a Filipino physician, surgeon, and politician who became member of the Philippine Assembly from 1907 to 1909 and the Philippine House of Representatives from 1916 to 1919 representing Ambos Camarines's 2nd congressional district.

== Biography ==
Manuel Rey was born on November 2, 1868 in Cuyo, Calamianes (now Palawan). He attended high school in Ateneo Municipal de Manila which in 1885, he obtained his bacholer's degree. He then studied medicine in the University of Santo Tomas for two years from 1887 until he continued his education in University of Valladolid, Spain. In Spain, he obtained his degree in medicine and surgery in 1891. He subsequently returned to the Philippines and served in different provinces and became regular physician at the Mariveles Lazareto. When the Philippine Revolution broke out, he served as a medic under General Vicente Lukban in Samar.

During the 1902 cholera epidemic, he was a municipal physician in Nueva Cáceres. Since 1900, Rey was a member of the provincial board of Ambos Camarines.

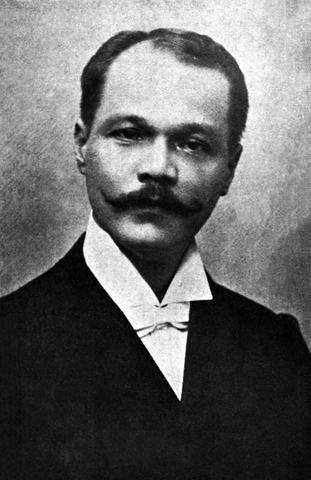
Rey as a member of the Philippine Assembly, 1908

In 1907, he was elected to the Philippine Assembly representing Ambos Camarines's 2nd district. He defeated Fulgencio Contreras, a member of the Progresista Party. In the first Philippine Assembly, he served as chairman of the Committee on Health and Special Committees on Cockpits and Horse Racing. He was elected to the Philippine House of Representatives in 1916 after gaining 1,121 votes against his opponent, Felipe Mompombanua, who only gained 826 votes.
