= Domingo Imperial =

Filipino politician

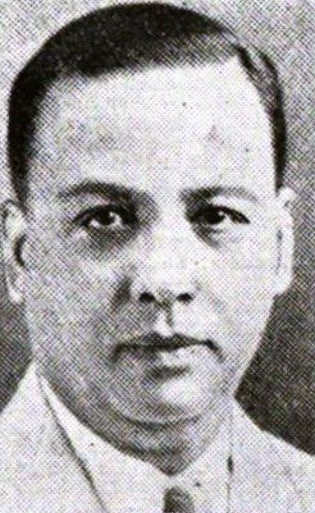
- Senatorial portrait of Imperial, published by Benipayo Press, c. 1935

Senator of the Philippines
- In office July 5, 1945 – May 25, 1946

Senator of the Philippines from the 6th District
- In office June 5, 1934 – November 15, 1935 Serving with Jose O. Vera
- Preceded by: Jose Fuentebella
- Succeeded by: office abolished

Chairman of the Commission on Elections
- In office 14 April 1951 – 31 March 1958
- Appointed by: Elpidio Quirino
- Preceded by: Vicente de Vera
- Succeeded by: Jose Carag

Associate Justice of the Supreme Court of the Philippines
- In office 11 May 1942 – 31 January 1944
- Appointed by: Jorge Vargas (as President of the Philippine Executive Commission)
- Preceded by: Jose Yulo
- Succeeded by: Felicisimo Feria

Personal details
- Born: August 4, 1890 Daraga, Albay, Captaincy General of the Philippines
- Died: July 19, 1965 (aged 74)
- Party: Nacionalista

Domingo Fernandez Imperial (August 4, 1890 – July 19, 1965) was a Filipino politician.

== Early life and education ==
He was the son of David Imperial and Lena Fernandez. He attended the San Beda College, Liceo de Manila and the University of Santo Tomas, graduating from the latter with a Bachelor of Arts degree. He then taught in the Investra Señora del Rosario College and in the Colegio Mercantil (now National University), from 1907 to 1908 and studied law in Escuela de la Jurisprudencia, finishing his course in 1912, and passed the bar examinations with the highest average the same year.

He later established his law office in Albay.

Imperial belonged to a family that dominated politics in Albay for many years. His cousin Carlos Imperial was Albay's representative to the 1st Philippine Legislature and a Justice of the Supreme Court of the Philippines. His cousin Leoncio Imperial was also a senator from 1917 to 1922 and governor from 1912 to 1916 and from 1922 to 1925. His brother, Jose Imperial was also governor of Albay. His son, Carlos R. Imperial, was a congressman for the 2nd district of Albay and an MP in the Interim Batasang Pambansa.

== Political career ==
In 1934, he was elected Senator from the 6th District comprising the Bicol region. In the 1935 Philippine presidential election, he was one of the chief campaign managers in the region for the Nacionalista ticket of President Manuel Quezon and Vice President Sergio Osmeña. He was later appointed by Quezon as one of the first justices of the Court of Appeals.

In 1941, Imperial was elected in the Senate elections on November 11, 1941 as a candidate of the Nacionalista Party. However, he and other Senators were not able to take office due to the invasion and occupation of the Philippines by the Japanese the following month. He was only able to serve when the body was reconvened after the Liberation of the country in 1945 and served until 1946. In the meantime, he was appointed as an Associate Justice of the Supreme Court by the Japanese-installed Philippine Executive Commission from 1942 to 1944, but was not recognized as such until 2019.

In 1951, Imperial was appointed by President Elpidio Quirino as Chairman of the Commission on Elections following the death of Vicente de Vera. During his tenure, he oversaw several electoral exercises such as the 1951 Senate election, the 1953 presidential election, the 1955 Senate election, and the 1957 presidential election. He resigned from office in 1958.
