= Philippines's 6th senatorial district =

Abolished senatorial district in the Philippines

- Former constituency for the Senate of the Philippines
- Provinces / Cities: Albay, Camarines Norte, Camarines Sur, Masbate, Sorsogon
- Population: 1,046,267 (1935)
- Electorate: 166,745 (1935)

Former constituency
- Created: 1916
- Abolished: 1934

Philippines's 6th senatorial district, officially the Sixth Senatorial District of the Philippine Islands (Spanish: Sexto Distrito Senatorial de las Islas Filipinas), was one of the twelve senatorial districts of the Philippines in existence between 1916 and 1935. It elected two members to the Senate of the Philippines, the upper chamber of the bicameral Philippine Legislature under the Insular Government of the Philippine Islands for each of the 4th to 10th legislatures. The district was created under the 1916 Jones Law from the southern Luzon provinces of Albay, Ambos Camarines and Sorsogon. Ambos Camarines was split into the provinces of Camarines Norte and Camarines Sur in 1919, and Masbate was added in 1920 upon its re-establishment as a regular province separate from Sorsogon.

The district was represented by a total of seven senators throughout its existence. It was abolished in 1935 when a unicameral National Assembly was installed under a new constitution following the passage of the Tydings–McDuffie Act which established the Commonwealth of the Philippines. Since the 1941 elections when the Senate was restored after a constitutional plebiscite, all twenty-four members of the upper house have been elected countrywide at-large. It was last represented by José O. Vera of the Nacionalista Demócrata Pro-Independencia and Domingo Imperial of the Nacionalista Democrático.

== List of senators ==
Seat A							Legislature	Seat B						
#	Image	Senator	Term of office		Party	Electoral history	Legislature	#	Image	Senator	Term of office		Party	Electoral history
#	Image	Senator	Start	End	Party	Electoral history	Legislature	#	Image	Senator	Start	End	Party	Electoral history
1		José Fuentebella	–	–	Nacionalista	Elected in 1916. Declined to assume office. Election nullified due to alleged irregularities.	4th	1		Tomás Aréjola	–	–	Nacionalista	Elected in 1916. Election nullified due to alleged irregularities.
2		Leoncio Imperial	March 5, 1917	June 6, 1922	Nacionalista	Elected in 1917.	4th	2		Mario Guariña	March 5, 1917	June 3, 1919	Nacionalista	Elected in 1917.
2		Leoncio Imperial	March 5, 1917	June 6, 1922	Nacionalista	Elected in 1917.	5th	3		Vicente de Vera	June 3, 1919	June 2, 1925	Nacionalista	Elected in 1919.
3		Juan B. Alegre	June 6, 1922	June 5, 1928	Nacionalista; Colectivista	Elected in 1922.	6th	3		Vicente de Vera	June 3, 1919	June 2, 1925	Nacionalista; Colectivista	Elected in 1919.
3		Juan B. Alegre	June 6, 1922	June 5, 1928	Nacionalista; Consolidado	Elected in 1922.	7th	4		José O. Vera	June 2, 1925	June 2, 1931	Nacionalista; Consolidado	Elected in 1925.
{1)		José Fuentebella	June 5, 1928	June 5, 1934	Nacionalista; Consolidado	Elected in 1928.	8th	4		José O. Vera	June 2, 1925	June 2, 1931	Nacionalista; Consolidado	Elected in 1925.
{1)		José Fuentebella	June 5, 1928	June 5, 1934	Nacionalista; Consolidado	Elected in 1928.	9th	5		Juan B. Alegre	June 2, 1931	June 14, 1931	Democrata	Elected in 1931. Died.
{1)		José Fuentebella	June 5, 1928	June 5, 1934	Nacionalista; Consolidado	Elected in 1928.	9th	(4)		José O. Vera	August 18, 1931	September 16, 1935	Nacionalista	Elected in 1931 to finish Alegre's term.
4		Domingo Imperial	June 5, 1934	September 16, 1935	Nacionalista; Democrático	Elected in 1934.	10th	(4)		José O. Vera	August 18, 1931	September 16, 1935	Nacionalista; Demócrata Pro-Independencia	Elected in 1931 to finish Alegre's term.

== See also ==
- Senatorial districts of the Philippines
