= Guillermo Pablo =

Filipino jurist and politician

The Honorable Guillermo F. Pablo
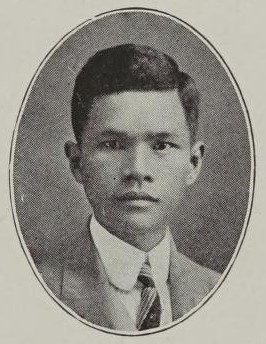
- Pablo as member of the Philippine House of Representatives, c. 1921

47th Associate Justice of the Philippine Supreme Court
- In office June 6, 1945 – June 4, 1955
- Appointed by: Sergio Osmena
- Preceded by: None (reorganized after Japanese organization)
- Succeeded by: Pastor Endencia

Member of the House of Representatives of the Philippines from Zambales's Lone District
- In office 1916–1922
- Preceded by: Gabriel Alba
- Succeeded by: Alejo Labrador

Personal details
- Born: June 25, 1886 San Antonio, Zambales, Captaincy General of the Philippines
- Died: August 2, 1982 (aged 96) Marikina, Philippines
- Spouse: Leonor Ponco

Guillermo Flavier Pablo y de Jesús (June 25, 1886 – August 2, 1982) was a Filipino jurist and politician who served as an Associate Justice of the Supreme Court from 1945 to 1955. He had earlier served as a member of the House of Representatives of the Philippines, representing the Lone District of Zambales from 1916 to 1922.

== Profile ==
Pablo was born in San Antonio, Zambales. He earned his law degree from the Escuela de Derecho de Manila (now Manila Law College) and was admitted to the Philippine bar on October 8, 1908. Before his admission to the bar, Pablo worked as a journalist for several newspapers, including the La Independencia, the official daily of the Partido Independencia.

Pablo was appointed acting provincial fiscal of Zambales in 1915. The following year, he was elected as a representative from Zambales to the Philippine Assembly, winning re-election in 1919. Pablo's second term in the House expired in 1922.

In 1924, Pablo was appointed an auxiliary judge, and later a district judge, in Cebu. He was then named to the Court of First Instance of Nueva Ecija in 1938. In 1945, he was appointed by President Sergio Osmeña to the Court of First Instance of Rizal and Bataan.

In June 1945, President Osmeña named Pablo to the Supreme Court as an Associate Justice. Justice Pablo was one of the last Philippine Supreme Court Justices to author his opinions in the Spanish language. One of his most notable opinions for the Court was in Moncado v. People's Court (1948), which declined to adopt the exclusionary rule in the Philippines; the exclusionary rule would later be adopted by the Supreme Court in Stonehill v. Diokno (1967), which explicitly abandoned Moncado.

Justice Pablo retired from the Supreme Court in 1955. He died in Marikina on August 2, 1982.

== Notes ==
Legal offices
Preceded by none (reorganized upon Japanese occupation)	Associate Justice of the Supreme Court of the Philippines; 1945–1955	Succeeded by Pastor Endencia
