= 1916 Philippine Assembly elections =

4th Philippine Assembly elections

- June 6, 1916

All 90 seats in the Philippine Assembly 46 seats needed for a majority
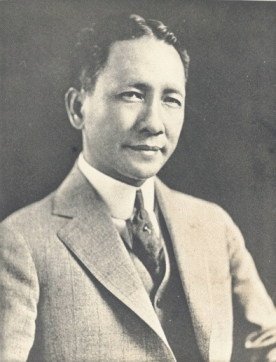

	Majority party	Minority party
Leader	Sergio Osmeña
Party	Nacionalista	Progresista
Leader's seat	Cebu–2nd
Last election	62 seats, 53.35%	16 seats, 16.18%
Seats won	75	7
Seat change	▲13	▼9
Speaker before election
Sergio Osmeña
Nacionalista
Elected Speaker
Sergio Osmeña
Nacionalista

The elections for the members of the Philippine Assembly were held on June 6, 1916 pursuant to the Philippine Organic Act of 1902 which prescribed elections for every three years. The elected representatives would serve in the 4th Philippine Legislature from 1916 to 1919.

After the passage of the Jones Law on August 29, 1916 in where the Philippine Assembly would be replaced by the House of Representatives of the Philippines or the Lower House, the elected members of the Philippine Assembly would be automatically members of the new House of Representatives.

== Results ==
↓

75	7	6	2
Nacionalista	PP	IND	^{[1]}

^{1} Partido Democrata Nacional

Party	Seats	+/–
Nacionalista Party	75	+13
Progresista Party	7	−9
Partido Democrata Nacional	2	New
Independent	6	+3
Total	90	+9
Source: Cesar Pobre

== See also ==
- 4th Philippine Legislature
- 1916 Philippine Senate elections
