= Vicente de Vera =

Filipino lawyer and politician (1871-1951)

The Honorable Vicente de Vera
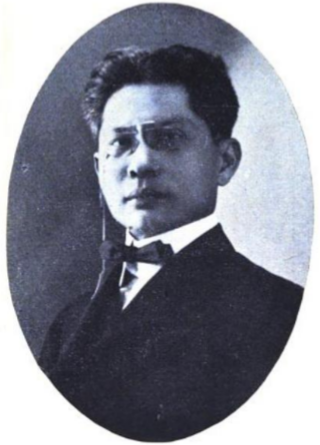
- De Vera as a member of the Philippine Assembly, 1908

Chairman of the Commission on Elections
- In office May 9, 1947 – April 10, 1951
- Appointed by: Manuel Roxas
- Preceded by: Jose Lopez Vito
- Succeeded by: Domingo Imperial

Commissioner on Elections
- In office July 12, 1945 – May 9, 1947
- Appointed by: Sergio Osmeña
- Preceded by: Rufino Luna

Senator of the Philippines from the 6th District
- In office June 3, 1919 – June 2, 1925 Serving with Leoncio Imperial; Juan B. Alegre
- Preceded by: Mario Guariña
- Succeeded by: José O. Vera

Member of the House of Representatives from Sorsogon's 1st district
- In office October 16, 1907 – October 16, 1909
- Preceded by: office established
- Succeeded by: Leoncio Grajo

Governor of Sorsogon
- In office 1904–1904
- Preceded by: Bernardino Monreal
- Succeeded by: Bernardino Monreal

Personal details
- Born: August 22, 1871 Bulan, Sorsogon, Captaincy General of the Philippines
- Died: April 10, 1951 (aged 79) Sampaloc, Manila, Philippines
- Party: Nacionalista
- Spouse: Presentación Pérez

Vicente de Vera y Comson (August 22, 1871 – April 10, 1951) was a Filipino lawyer and politician from Sorsogon during the American occupation.

== Biography ==
Vicente de Vera was born on August 22, 1871, in Bulan, Sorsogon to Pedro de Vera and Valentina Comson.

De Vera was appointed vice mayor of the municipality of Sorsogon in 1904. That same year, he temporarily replaced Bernardino Monreal as governor of Sorsogon province. In 1907, De Vera was elected to the newly established Philippine House of Representatives representing the 1st district of Sorsogon, serving until 1909 and becoming chairman of the Committee on the Judiciary. In 1919, De Vera was elected to the Senate of the Philippines representing the 6th Senatorial District which comprised the Bicol region, serving until 1925.

In 1945, De Vera was appointed to become a member of the Commission on Elections (COMELEC), becoming its chairman in 1947. He oversaw several electoral exercises in the county such as the 1946 Philippine presidential election, the 1947 Philippine constitutional plebiscite, the 1947 Philippine Senate election, and the 1949 Philippine presidential election. De Vera served as COMELEC chair until his death in 1951.

== Personal life ==
De Vera's son, Teodoro de Vera, served as a senator for the Liberal Party from 1949 to 1952, unseated by Senator Claro M. Recto who was found to have won the contested senate seat, which led to an unsuccessful attempt by the latter's rivals in the Nacionalista Party to have the elder de Vera removed by the Supreme Court as COMELEC chairman due to a supposed conflict of interest in his son's election.
