= Mario Guariña =

Filipino lawyer and politician

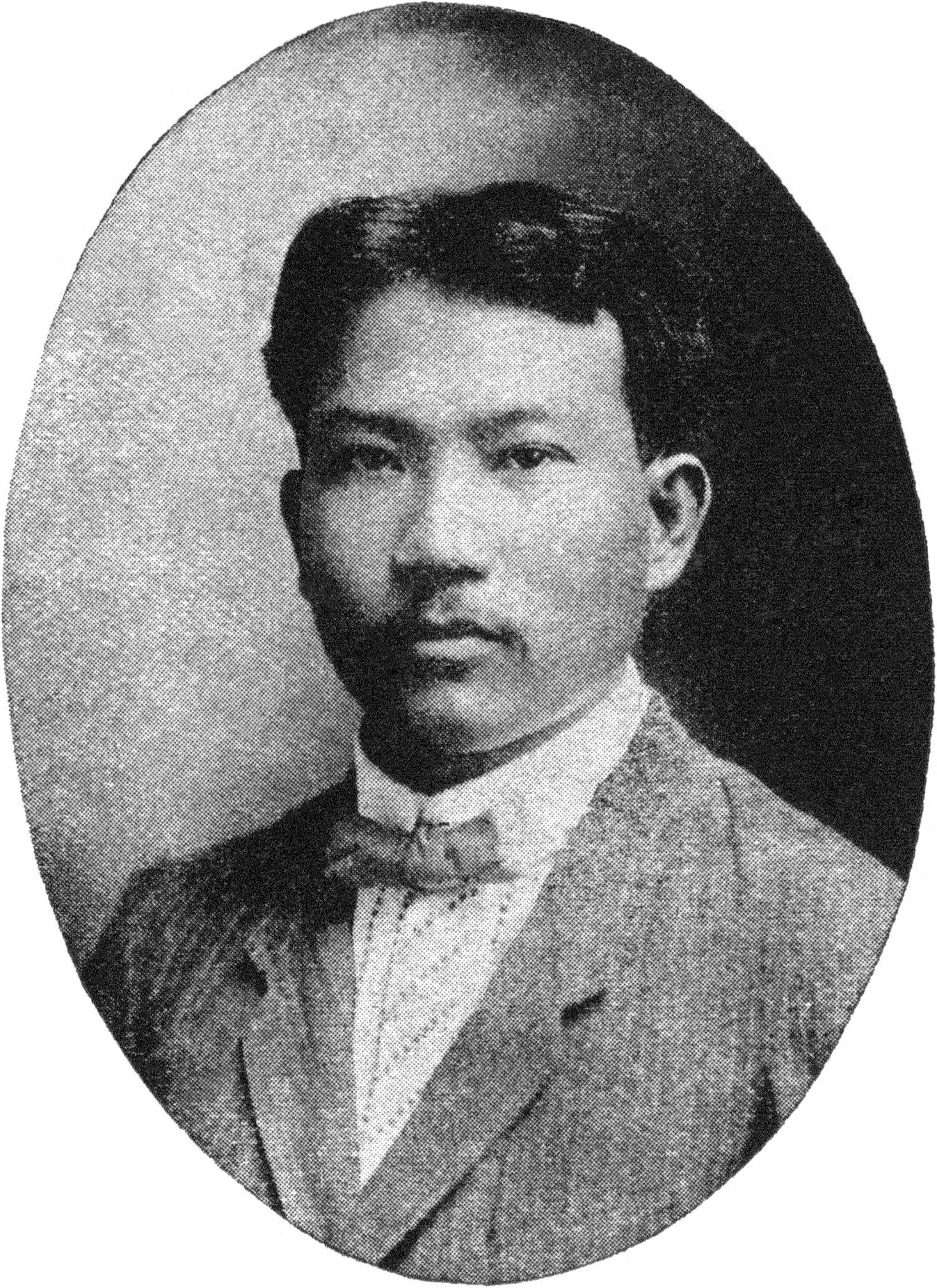
- Guariña in 1908

Senator of the Philippines from the 6th District
- In office March 5, 1917 – June 3, 1919 Serving with Leoncio Imperial
- Preceded by: Position established Tomas Arejola (as senator-elect)
- Succeeded by: Vicente de Vera

Member of the House of Representatives from Sorsogon's 2nd district
- In office June 2, 1925 – June 5, 1928
- Preceded by: Federico Jimenez
- Succeeded by: Francisco Arellano

Governor of Sorsogon
- In office 1908–1912
- Preceded by: Bernardino Monreal
- Succeeded by: Victor Eco

Personal details
- Born: January 19, 1876 Juban, Sorsogon, Captaincy General of the Philippines
- Died: October 8, 1935 (aged 59) Pasay, Rizal, Philippine Islands
- Party: Nacionalista

Mario Guariña y Guerrero (January 19, 1876 – October 8, 1935) was a Filipino lawyer and politician during the American occupation from Sorsogon.

== Early life and education ==
Guariña was born in Juban, Sorsogon to Mariano Guariña and Maria Guerrero. He received his Bachelor of Arts degree from the University of Santo Tomas and his Bachelor of Laws degree from the Escuela de Derecho.

== Career ==
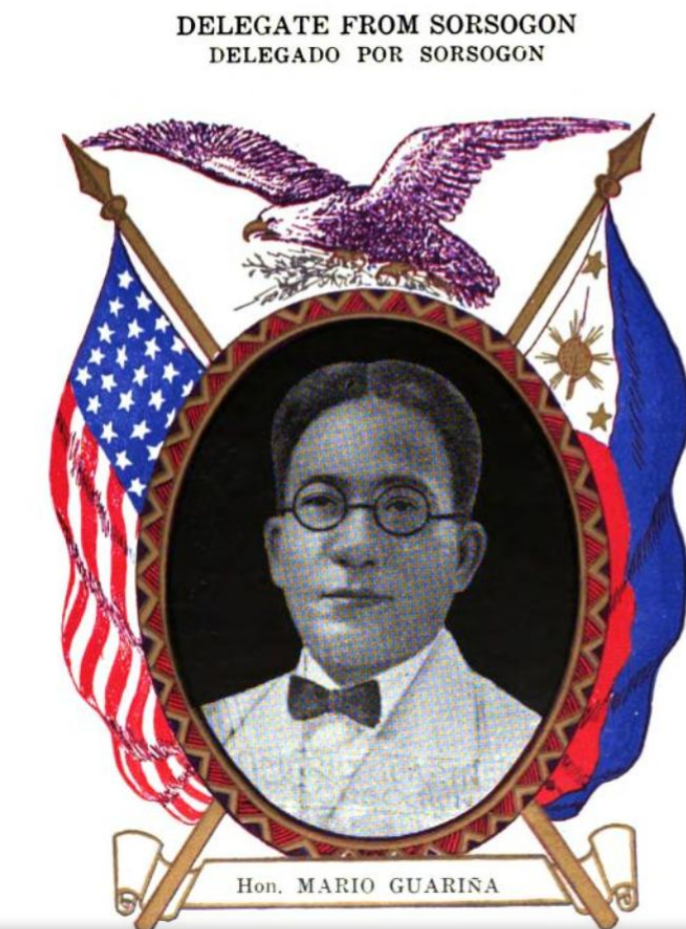
Photograph published by Benipayo Press, c. 1935

Guariña held several administrative positions such as Provincial Fiscal of Leyte and later, Batangas, as well as assistant director of the Bureau of Prisons.

In politics, he served as Governor of Sorsogon from 1908 to 1912. He was later elected to the newly established Philippine Senate for the 6th District, comprising the Bicol region, from 1917 to 1919, through a recall election due to the alleged irregularities in 1916. He later returned to the national legislature as representative for Sorsogon's 2nd district in the House of Representatives from 1925 to 1928. He later served as a member of the 1934 Philippine Constitutional Convention representing Sorsogon.

== Personal life ==
Guariña was married to Agueda Dia and had six children.
