= Leoncio Imperial =

Filipino politician

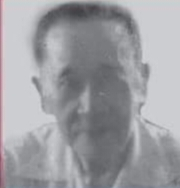

Senator of the Philippines from the 6th district
- In office 5 March 1917 – 6 June 1922
- Preceded by: Jose Fuentebella (as Senator-elect)
- Succeeded by: Juan B. Alegre

8th Governor of Albay
- In office 16 October 1922 – 16 October 1925
- Preceded by: José O. Vera
- Succeeded by: Mariano Locsin
- In office 16 October 1912 – 3 October 1916
- Preceded by: Domingo Samson
- Succeeded by: Rufino Tuanqui

Personal details
- Born: circa 1878
- Died: January 8, 1962

Leoncio Duran Imperial was a Filipino politician. He was governor of Albay from 1912 to 1916 and from 1922 to 1924. In the intervening period, Imperial served as a member of the Senate of the Philippines.

== Biography ==
Leoncio Imperial was born in the province of Albay. He was one of six children of Paciano Imperial and Josefa Duran. His father was Provincial Secretary of the Revolutionary Government during the Philippine Revolution. Imperial's grandfather, was Sinforozo Imperial, a mayor of Daraga and Legazpi in the mid-19th century. Leoncio Imperial was admitted to the Philippine bar in 1902.

Imperial served as governor of Albay from 1913 to 1916. In 1917, he was elected to the newly created Senate of the Philippines from the 6th district following a scandal that led to the nullification of the previous results due to fraud and a rerun of the election. Because he received more votes than the other elected candidate Mario Guariña, his term in the Senate lasted six years. At the end of his term in 1922, Imperial was again elected governor of Albay, serving until 1925. In 1949, he was appointed as technical assistant to President Elpidio Quirino.

== Family ==
Imperial belonged to a family that dominated politics in Albay for many years. His brother Carlos A. Imperial was Albay's representative to the 1st Philippine Legislature and a Justice of the Supreme Court of the Philippines. His cousin Domingo Imperial was also a senator from 1934 to 1935 and from 1945 to 1946. Another cousin, Jose Imperial was also governor of Albay. His second cousin, Carlos R. Imperial, was a congressman for the 2nd district of Albay and an MP in the Interim Batasang Pambansa.
