= Progresista Party =

Defunct political party in the Philippines

- Founded: 1907
- Dissolved: early 1920s
- Preceded by: Federalista Party
- Succeeded by: Democrata Party (de facto)
- Ideology: Conservatism; Pro-statehood
- Political position: Centre-right

The Progresista Party (Filipino and Spanish: Partido Progresista; lit. 'Progressive Party') was a political party in the Philippines during the early 20th century. Formed in 1900 as the Federalist Party (Partido Federalista), the party originally had the Philippines becoming a U.S. state as one of its original platforms, which was later rescinded.

== Origins as the Partido Federalista ==
After the defeat of the Filipinos by the Americans on the Philippine–American War (then known as the Philippine Insurrection), the Americans assessed the situation; the United States Congress passed the Philippine Organic Act of 1902 creating the Philippine Assembly. While the assembly had nationalists who wanted independence from the United States, most delegates pursued statehood within the U.S. These delegates, led by Pedro Paterno, formed the Partido Federalista (Federalist Party or the Federalistas) on December 23, 1900. On that meeting, the party platform of the recognition of U.S. sovereignty, establishment of peace and eventual statehood, elected Trinidad Pardo de Tavera as the first party president. The party dominated Manila politics and derived most of its power from that city

The Federalistas, who were favored by the Americans such as governor-general William Howard Taft, dominated the assembly until 1905 when internal divisions and the new Nacionalista Party began to dominate the assembly. Prior to that, the Federalistas expanded their influence in the provinces, winning elections in 1902 and 1904. As long as Taft was the governor-general, the Federalistas enjoyed personal patronage from him. His departure in 1903 marked the beginning of the Federalistas' end. While Taft's departure was a big blow, the declining of importance of appointive government posts and the increasing importance of officials who are elected sapped the party's strength in the provinces.

== Renaming to the Partido Progresista ==
With declining political fortunes, the Federalistas rescinded the statehood platform in 1905. The other political group in the Assembly, those who supported independence (split between the Independistas and the Union Nacionalista), began increasing their ranks, and that the Federalistas attempted to merge with the Union Nacionalistas in December 1906. This made the Federalistas ideologically closer with the Nacionalistas, with Juan Sumulong maintaining close contact with the "conservative" Union Nacionalista leader Rafael Palma.

In January 1907, the leaders of the party met in Manila and decided to change the name from "Partido Federalista" to "Partido Nacional Progresista" (Nationalist Progressive Party), as the word "Federal" had become insignificant with the dropping of the statehood platform. The Progresistas embarked on a campaign to win seats at the 1907 elections, although with all but two seats coming from the provinces, the party had a difficult time recruiting followers and candidates. The reception at Progresista political rallies were from lukewarm to hostile, with people heckling "Hang them, kill them".

The Progresista campaign for Manila's two assembly seats focused on getting more Americans to register – and vote – for them. In the provinces, the Progresistas had a hard time getting candidates, but the Nacionalista Party were split into different factions, not on ideological but on personal grounds. Ultimately, the Assembly was won by the Nacionalistas, and the Progresistas became marginalized.

== Dissolution ==
The party managed to win fewer seats in the succeeding elections, eventually being dissolved in the early 1920s. In 1914, Teodoro Sandiko and other disgruntled Progresistas formed the Partido Democrata Nacional or the Democrata Party (Democrat Nationalist Party) as the leading opposition against the Nacionalistas.

== Electoral performance ==
=== Senate ===
Election	Seats after	Outcome of election
1916	1 / 24	Lost
1919	1 / 24	Lost

=== Philippine Assembly ===
Election	Number of votes	Share of votes	Seats	Outcome of election
1907	24,234	25.25%	16 / 80	Lost
1909	38,588	20.00%	17 / 81	Lost
1912	37,842	16.18%	16 / 81	Lost
1916			7 / 90	Lost

== Sources ==
- Cullinane, Michael (1989). Ilustrado Politics: Filipino Elite Responses to American Rule, 1898-1908. Ateneo de Manila University Press. ISBN 978-971-550-439-3.
- Mojares, Resil B. (2006). Brains of the nation: Pedro Paterno, T.H. Pardo de Tavera, Isabelo de los Reyes, and the production of modern knowledge. Ateneo de Manila University Press. ISBN 978-971-550-496-6.
- Pefianco, Romeo (2005-02-26). "Babel of parties in RP". Manila Bulletin.
