= 1934 Philippine legislative election =

- June 5, 1934
- Senate election

11 of the 24 seats in the Philippine Senate
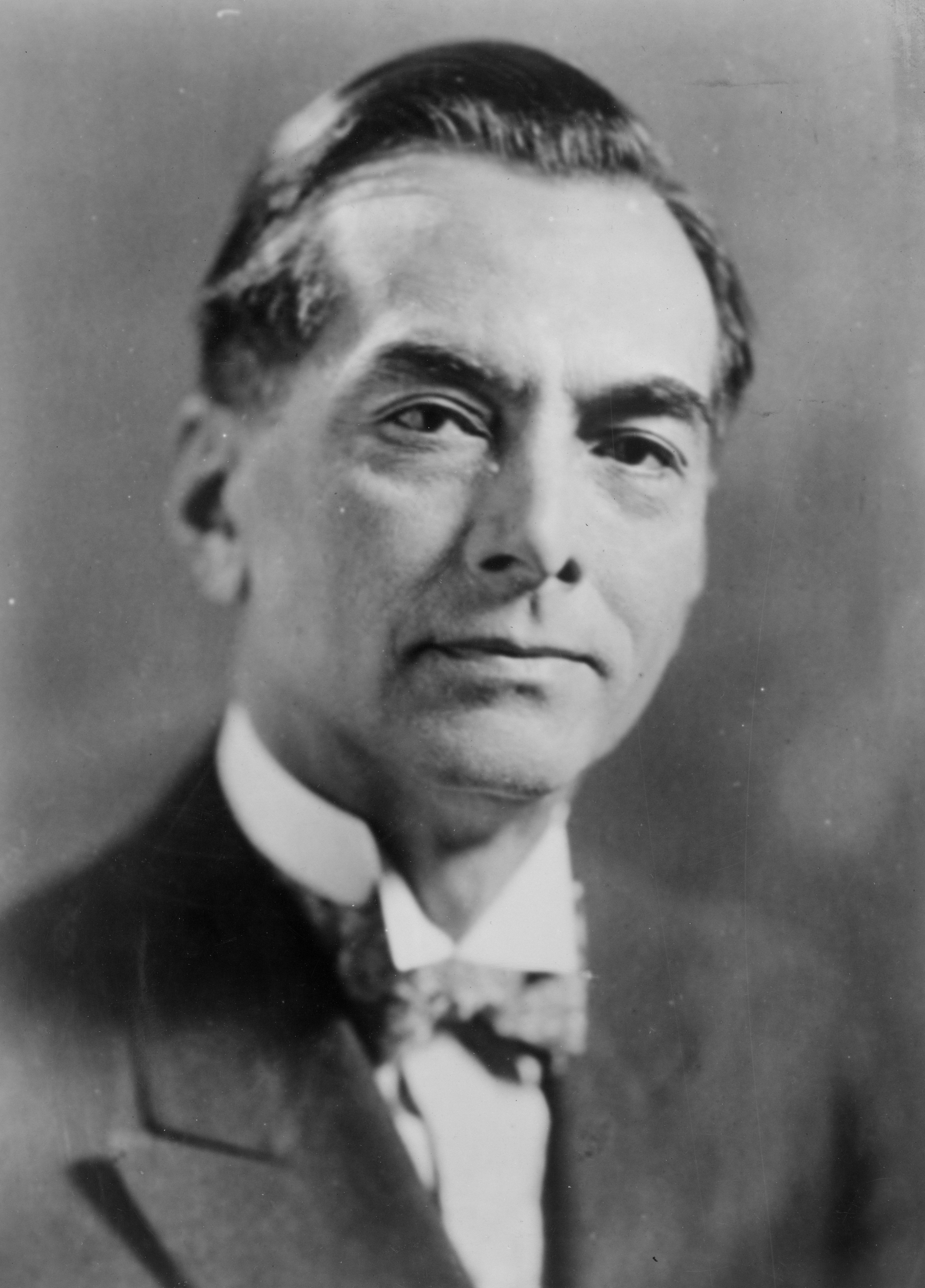

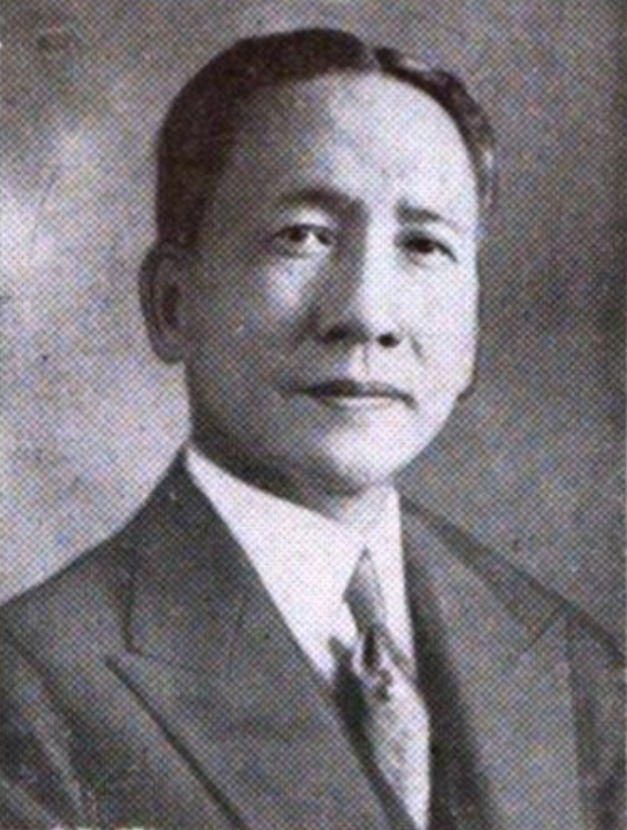
	First party	Second party
Leader	Manuel L. Quezon	Sergio Osmeña
Party	Nacionalista; Democratico	Nacionalista; Pro-Independencia
Leader's seat	5th District	10th District
Seats won	8	3
Seats after	16	8
Senate President before election
Manuel L. Quezon
Nacionalista–Colectivista
Elected Senate President
Manuel L. Quezon
Nacionalista–Colectivista
- House of Representatives election

All 92 seats in the House of Representatives of the Philippines 47 seats needed for a majority
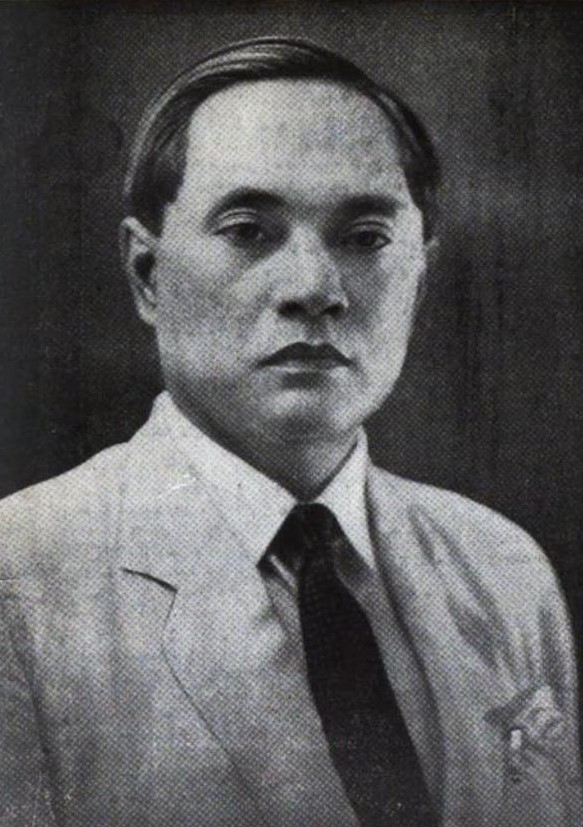

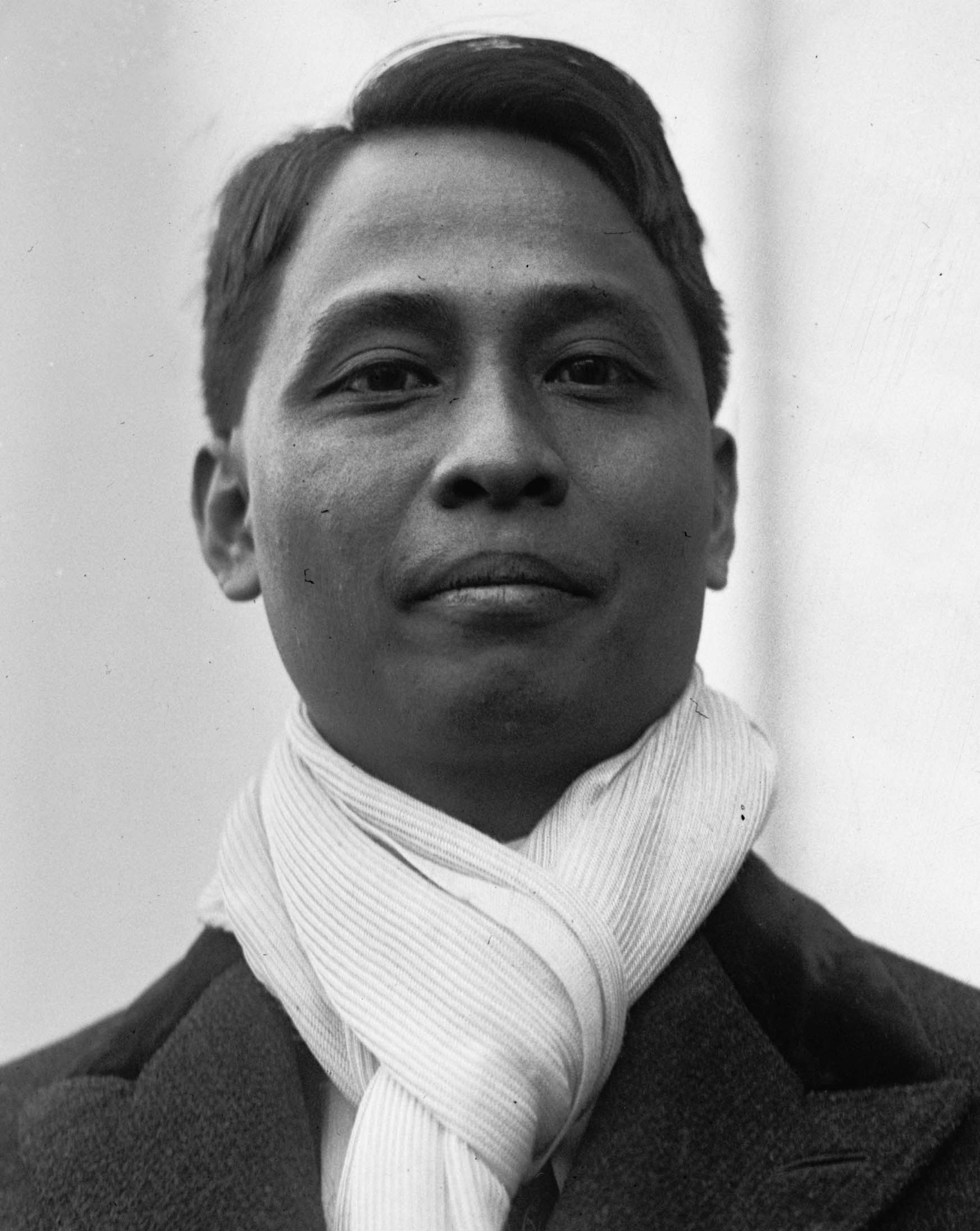
	First party	Second party
Leader	Quintín Paredes	Manuel Roxas
Party	Nacionalista Democratico	Nacionalista Democrata Pro-Independencia
Leader's seat	Abra	Capiz–1st
Seats won	70	19
Seat change	▲2	▼49
Speaker before election
Manuel Roxas
Nacionalista
Consolidado
Elected Speaker
Quintín Paredes
Nacionalista
Democratico

Elections to the Philippine Legislature were held on June 5, 1934 pursuant to the Jones Law of 1916 which prescribed elections for every three years. Votes elected 92 members of the House of Representatives in the Philippine House of Representatives elections; and 11 out of 24 members of the Senate in the Philippine Senate elections.

== Background ==
Senate President Manuel Quezon initiated an idea to lobby an independence bill to US Congress, but due to his failing health, he proposed it to Senate President Pro-Tempore Sergio Osmeña and House Speaker Manuel Roxas. The latter two's independence lobby dubbed OsRox Mission.

After negotiations of OsRox, an independence bill was passed authored by South Carolina Representative Butler Hare, Missouri Senator Harry Bartow Hawes and New Mexico Senator Bronson M. Cutting (Hare–Hawes–Cutting Act). But when it was in a Senate Committee, many members debated to prolong commonwealth years, with others arguing about military presence. In Manila, even though Quezon believes that the independence bill will pass through, opposition to some of its provisions mounted from Filipino members of the Legislature.

After many arguments, session endings, and demonstrations, in December 1932, the Hare–Hawes–Cutting Act passed on the both chambers, and overridden the veto of President Herbert Hoover by January 1933. With the passage of the bill, Philippine Legislature needs to ratify it. Quezon stated his opposition, and called for revision of some of the provisions.

With the return of Osmeña and Roxas in Manila by August 1933, and they clashed with Quezon, who campaigned for the rejection of it. Only 7 senators and 24 representatives voted for the bill. Later, Quezon lobbied for Tydings–McDuffie Act, with only difference is the military bases provision which can be negotiated its extension. This caused another party split (last happened in 1922), with Quezon has Nacionalista Democratico (Antis) against OsRox's Nacionalista Democrata Pro-Independencia (Pros).

== Results ==
=== Senate election results ===
↓

16	8
Democratico	Pro-Independencia

Party	Seats				
Party	Up	Before	Won	After	+/−
Nacionalista (Note: The Nacionalista Party won 11 seats: 8 seats under the Democratico faction and 3 seats under the Democrata Pro-Independencia faction. Following the election, the Nacionalista Party has a total of 24 seats: 16 seats under the Democratico faction and 8 seats under the Democrata Pro-Independencia faction.)	10	21	11	22	+1
Democrata	1	1	0	0	−1
Appointed (Note: Of the two appointed senators from Nacionalista, one was from the Democratico faction and one was from the Democrata Pro-Independencia faction.)	0	2	0	2	0
Total	11	24	11	24	1

=== House election results ===
↓

70	19	3
Democratico	Pro-Independencia	S.

Party	Seats	+/–
Nacionalista Democratico	70	New
Nacionalista Democrata Pro-Independencia	19	New
Sakdalista	3	New
Total	92	+6

== See also ==
- 10th Philippine Legislature
- 1934 Philippine House of Representatives elections
- 1934 Philippine Senate elections
