= 1909 Cavite's at-large Philippine Assembly district special election =

1909 Cavite's at-large assembly district special election
- January 19, 1909

Cavite's at-large district seat in the Philippine Assembly
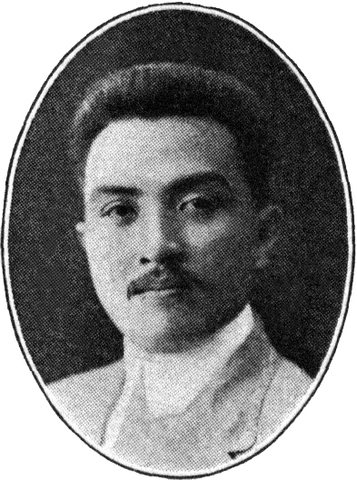

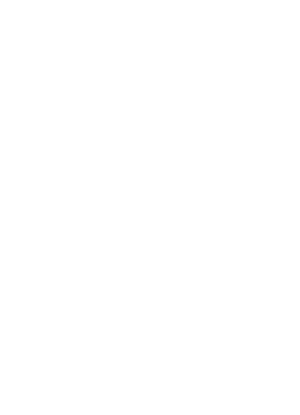

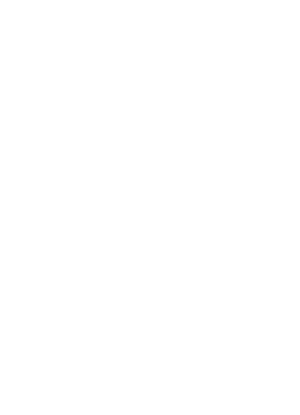
Candidate	Emiliano Tria Tirona	Catalino Nicolas	Hugo Salazar
Party	Nacionalista	Independent	Progresista
Popular vote	1,645	963	611
Percentage	51.10%	29.92%	18.98%
Delegate before election
Rafael Palma
Nacionalista
Subsequent delegate
Emiliano Tria Tirona
Nacionalista

A special election (known elsewhere as "by-elections") for the seat of Cavite's at-large district in the Philippine Assembly, the lower house of the Philippine Legislature of the Insular Government of the Philippine Islands, was held on January 19, 1909. This was triggered due to the appointment of the incumbent Rafael Palma as a member of the Philippine Commission. Emiliano Tría Tirona won the special election and served the remainder of Palma's term during the 1st Philippine Legislature.

== Background ==
In July 1908, during the final days of the administration of James Francis Smith as governor-general, William Cameron Forbes was appointed as vice governor-general, thereby making him Smith's successor when he retires. Additional appointments are Attorney-General Gregorio S. Araneta as Secretary of Finance and Justice, and judge Newton W. Gilbert and Cavite delegate Rafael Palma to the Philippine Commission.

== Preparation ==
Smith delayed the holding of the special election for about six months so as to avoid electioneering from local politicians; in November 1908, he ultimately scheduled the election for January 19, 1909.

== Campaign ==
More than a week before the election, Progresista candidate Hugo Salazar was assaulted by Manuel L. Quezon, a delegate from Tayabas (now Quezon in his honor), at La Democracia's offices. Quezon was disputing an article that appeared on La Democracia; the newspaper The Cablenews-American, when reporting about the incident, remarked "[W]e have nothing but words of protest against those who seek redress in this manner." Salazar then challenged Quezon to a duel, which Quezon rebuffed.

== Candidates ==
A total of three persons ran to fill the vacant seat, namely:

- Emiliano Tría Tirona (Nacionalista), director of the Instituto Filipino
- Catalino Nicolas (Independent), former municipal president of Cavite Puerto (1903–1904)
- Hugo Salazar (Progresista), editor of the La Democracia newspaper

In August 1908, Tría Tirona announced his intention of succeeding Palma in the assembly, refuting any association with the Centro Catolico or Catholic friars.

== Results ==
Tirona of the Nacionalista Party won the election; Salazar of the Progresista Party won in just 2 of 12 towns in the district. Tirona was seated to the Philippine Assembly, with the assembly unanimously accepting him, on February 3, 1909.

1909 Cavite's at-large Philippine Assembly district special election
Candidate	Party	Votes	%
Emiliano Tría Tirona	Nacionalista Party	1,645	51.10
Catalino Nicolas	Independent	963	29.92
Hugo Salazar	Progresista Party	611	18.98
Total		3,219	100.00
Majority		682	21.17
Nacionalista Party hold			
Source: The Cablenews-American

== Aftermath ==
Tirona won a full term in the general election later this year, but was defeated in 1912. Tirona reclaimed the seat in 1916, was elected to the Senate in 1922 and 1925. Tirona returned to the lower house, now the House of Representatives, in 1931. He was elected to the Senate anew in 1941, then served from 1945 until his death in 1952.

== See also ==
Other special elections held in Cavite:

- 1925 Cavite's at-large House of Representatives district special election
- 1929 Cavite's at-large House of Representatives district special election
- 2023 Cavite's 7th congressional district special election
