= 10th Philippine Legislature =

12th legislative term of the Philippines

←	9th	1st National Assembly	→
- Old Legislative Building (c. 1988)

Overview
- Term: July 16, 1934 – November 21, 1935
- Governor-General: Frank Murphy

Senate
- Members: 24
- President: Manuel L. Quezon
- President pro tempore: Jose Clarin (until June 2, 1935); Jose Avelino (from June 2, 1935)
- Majority leader: Claro M. Recto

House of Representatives
- Members: 92
- Speaker: Quintin Paredes
- Speaker pro tempore: Jose Zulueta
- Majority leader: Jose E. Romero

The 10th Philippine Legislature was the meeting of the legislature of the Philippines under the sovereign control of the United States from 1934 to 1935.

== Sessions ==
- First Regular Session: July 16 – November 8, 1934
- First Special Session: April 8, 1935
- Second Special Session: June 12 – 22, 1935
- Second Regular Session: June 24 – October 17, 1935
- Third Special Session: November 12 – 21, 1935

== Party summary ==
=== Senate ===
Composition of the Senate during the 10th Legislature.

	Party (shading shows control)				Total	Vacant
	Democratico	Pro-Independencia	Democrata	Independent	Total	Vacant
End of previous legislature	—N/a	—N/a	5	1	24	0
Begin	16	8	0	0	24	0
End	16	8	0	0	24	0
Final voting share	66.7%	33.3%	—N/a	—N/a		

=== House of Representatives ===
Composition of the House of Representatives during the 10th Legislature.

	Party (shading shows control)						Total	Vacant
	Democratico	Pro-Independencia	Democrata	Liberal	Sakdalista	Independent	Total	Vacant
End of previous legislature	—N/a	—N/a	8	1	—N/a	9	96	0
Begin	71	22	0	0	3	0	96	0
End	71	22	0	0	3	0	96	0
Final voting share	74%	22.9%	—N/a	—N/a	3.1%	—N/a		
Beginning of next legislature	72	26	0	0	0	0	98	0

== Leadership ==
=== Senate ===
Senate President

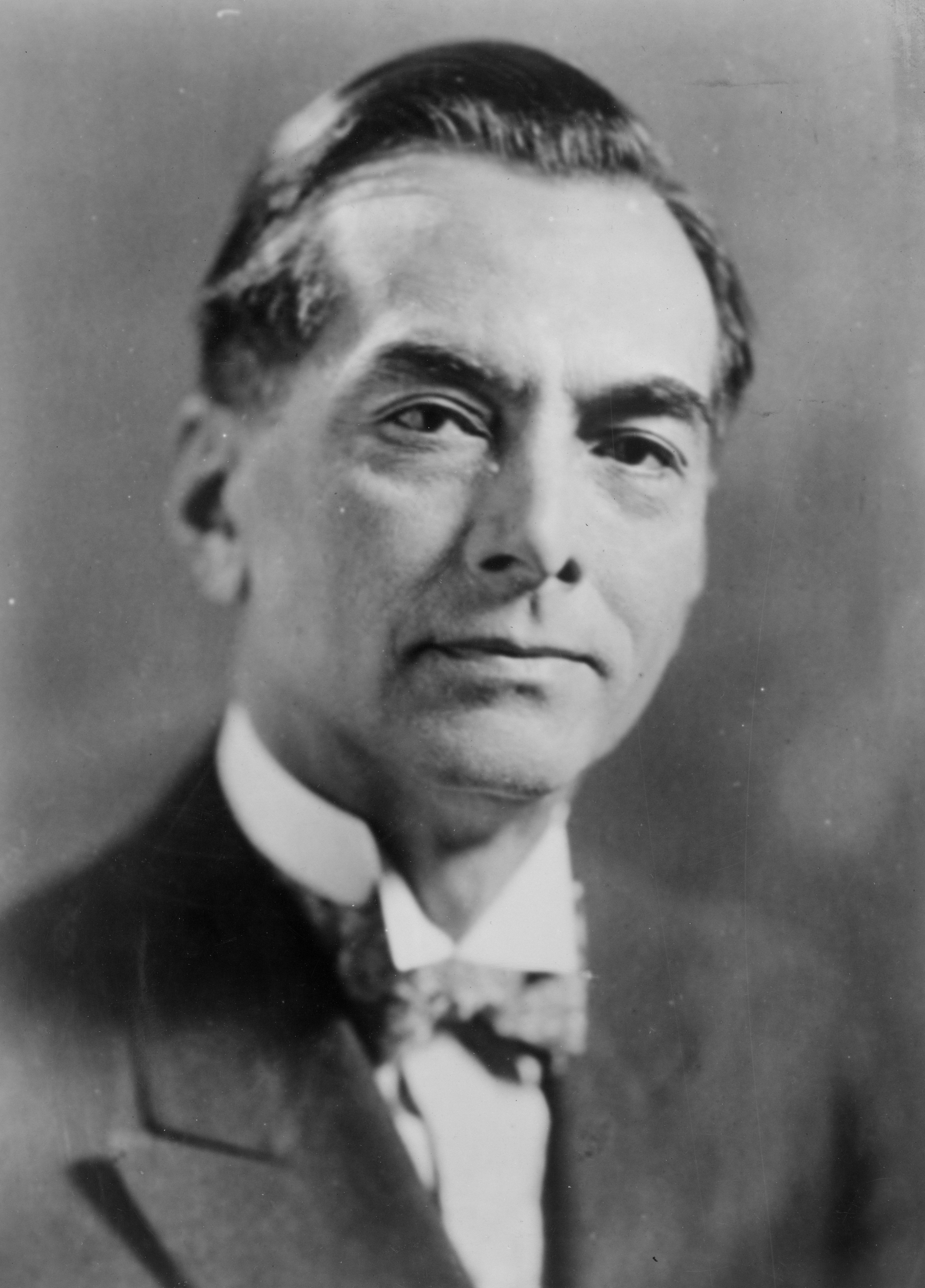
Manuel L. Quezon

- President: Manuel L. Quezon (5th District, Nacionalista Democratico)
- President pro tempore:
  - Jose Clarín (11th District, Nacionalista Democratico), until June 2, 1935
  - Jose Avelino (9th District, Nacionalista Democratico), from June 2, 1935
- Majority Floor Leader: Claro M. Recto (3rd District, Nacionalista)

=== House of Representatives ===
House Speaker

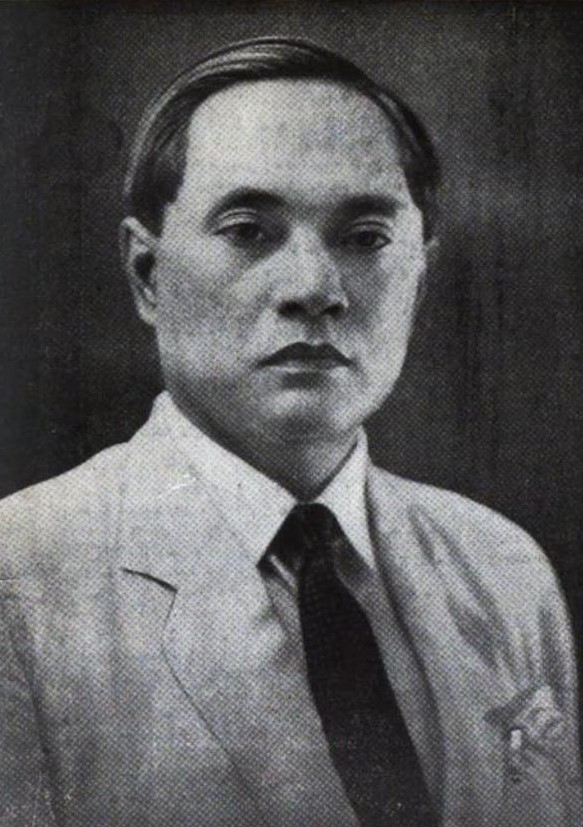
Quintín Paredes

- Speaker: Quintin Paredes (Abra, Nacionalista Democratico)
- Speaker pro tempore: Jose Zulueta (Iloilo–1st, Nacionalista Democratico)
- Majority Floor Leader: Jose E. Romero (Negros Oriental–2nd, Nacionalista Democratico)

== Members ==
=== Senate ===
The following are the terms of the elected senators of this Legislature, according to the date of election:

- For senators elected on June 2, 1931: June 2, 1931 – June 1, 1937
- For senators elected on June 5, 1934: June 5, 1934 – June 4, 1940

Senators of the 12th District were appointed for indefinite terms.

The inauguration of the Commonwealth of the Philippines on November 15, 1935 abolished the Senate and ended the terms of all the senators.

District	Term end	Senator	Party
1st District	1937	Elpidio Quirino	Nacionalista Democratico
1st District	1940	Melecio Arranz	Nacionalista Democratico
2nd District	1937	Alejo Mabanag	Nacionalista Democrata Pro-Independencia
2nd District	1940	Teofilo Sison	Nacionalista Democratico
3rd District	1937	Sotero Baluyut	Nacionalista Democratico
3rd District	1940	Hermogenes Concepcion	Nacionalista Democrata Pro-Independencia
4th District	1937	Juan Nolasco	Nacionalista Democratico
4th District	1940	Juan Sumulong	Nacionalista Democratico
5th District	1937	Claro M. Recto	Nacionalista Democratico
5th District	1940	Manuel L. Quezon	Nacionalista Democratico
6th District	1937	Jose O. Vera	Nacionalista Democrata Pro-Independencia
6th District	1940	Domingo Imperial	Nacionalista Democratico
7th District	1937	Ruperto Montinola	Nacionalista Democrata Pro-Independencia
7th District	1940	Potenciano Treñas (Note: Potenciano Treñas died on June 10, 1934.)	Nacionalista Democrata Pro-Independencia
8th District	1937	Gil Montilla	Nacionalista Democratico
8th District	1940	Isaac Lacson	Nacionalista Democratico
9th District	1937	Jose Maria Veloso	Nacionalista Democratico
9th District	1940	Jose Avelino	Nacionalista Democratico
10th District	1937	Manuel Briones	Nacionalista Democrata Pro-Independencia
10th District	1940	Sergio Osmeña	Nacionalista Democrata Pro-Independencia
11th District	1937	Juan Torralba	Nacionalista Democratico
11th District	1940	Jose Clarin (Note: Jose Clarin died on June 2, 1935.)	Nacionalista Democratico
12th District	—	Juan Gaerlan (Note: Appointed.)	Nacionalista Democratico
12th District	—	Datu Sinsuat Balabaran	Nacionalista Democrata Pro-Independencia

=== House of Representatives ===
Province/City	District	Representative	Party
Abra	Lone	Quintin Paredes	Nacionalista Democratico
Albay	1st	Exequiel Kare	Nacionalista Democratico
Albay	2nd	Justino N. Nuyda	Nacionalista Democratico
Albay	3rd	Sulpicio V. Cea	Nacionalista Democratico
Albay	4th	Jose T. Surtida	Nacionalista Democratico
Antique	Lone	Calixto Zaldivar	Nacionalista Democrata Pro-Independencia
Bataan	Lone	Teodoro Camacho	Nacionalista Democratico
Batanes	Lone	Vicente Agan	Nacionalista Democratico
Batangas	1st	Ramon Diokno	Nacionalista Democratico
Batangas	2nd	Luis Francisco	Nacionalista Democratico
Batangas	3rd	Emilio U. Mayo	Nacionalista Democratico
Bohol	1st	Bernardo Josol	Nacionalista Democratico
Bohol	2nd	Macario Q. Falcon	Nacionalista Democratico
Bohol	3rd	Margarito E. Revilles	Nacionalista Democrata Pro-Independencia
Bulacan	1st	Francisco Afan Delgado	Nacionalista Democratico
Bulacan	2nd	Pablo C. Payaual	Nacionalista Democratico
Cagayan	1st	Nicanor Carag	Nacionalista Democratico
Cagayan	2nd	Cosme Marzan	Nacionalista Democratico
Camarines Norte	Lone	Gabriel Hernandez	Nacionalista Democratico
Camarines Sur	1st	Ignacio Meliton	Nacionalista Democratico
Camarines Sur	2nd	Luis N. de Leon	Nacionalista Democratico
Capiz	1st	Manuel Roxas	Nacionalista Democrata Pro-Independencia
Capiz	2nd	Jose A. Dorado	Nacionalista Democrata Pro-Independencia
Capiz	3rd	Rufino L. Garde	Nacionalista Democrata Pro-Independencia
Cavite	Lone	Francisco Arca	Nacionalista Democratico
Cebu	1st	Tereso Dosdos	Nacionalista Democratico
Cebu	2nd	Hilario Abellana	Nacionalista Democrata Pro-Independencia
Cebu	3rd	Vicente Rama	Nacionalista Democratico
Cebu	4th	Agustin Kintanar	Nacionalista Democratico
Cebu	5th	Miguel Cuenco	Nacionalista Democrata Pro-Independencia
Cebu	6th	Nicolas Rafols	Nacionalista Democrata Pro-Independencia
Cebu	7th	Buenaventura Rodriguez	Nacionalista Democrata Pro-Independencia
Ilocos Norte	1st	Vicente T. Lazo	Nacionalista Democratico
Ilocos Norte	2nd	Julio Nalundasan (Note: Julio Nalundasan was assassinated on September 20, 1935.)	Nacionalista Democratico
Ilocos Sur	1st	Pedro Singson Reyes	Nacionalista Democratico
Ilocos Sur	2nd	Prospero Sanidad	Nacionalista Democratico
Iloilo	1st	Jose Zulueta	Nacionalista Democratico
Iloilo	2nd	Vicente R. Ybiernas	Nacionalista Democratico
Iloilo	3rd	Atanasio Ampig	Nacionalista Democrata Pro-Independencia
Iloilo	4th	Federico R. Tirador	Nacionalista Democrata Pro-Independencia
Iloilo	5th	Venancio Cudillo	Nacionalista Democrata Pro-Independencia
Isabela	Lone	Silvino M. Gumpal	Nacionalista Democrata Pro-Independencia
La Union	1st	Francisco Ortega	Nacionalista Democratico
La Union	2nd	Enrique Rimando	Nacionalista Democratico
Laguna	1st	Aurelio C. Almazan	Sakdalista
Laguna	2nd	Mariano S. Untivero	Sakdalista
Leyte	1st	Carlos Tan	Nacionalista Democratico
Leyte	2nd	Dominador Tan	Nacionalista Democratico
Leyte	3rd	Tomas Oppus	Nacionalista Democratico
Leyte	4th	Fortunato M. Sevilla	Nacionalista Democratico
Leyte	5th	Jorge B. Delgado	Nacionalista Democratico
Manila	1st	Francisco Varona	Nacionalista Democrata Pro-Independencia
Manila	2nd	Alfonso E. Mendoza	Nacionalista Democrata Pro-Independencia
Marinduque	Lone	Jose A. Uy	Nacionalista Democratico
Masbate	Lone	Emilio B. Espinosa	Nacionalista Democratico
Mindanao and Sulu	Lone	Alauya Alonto	Nacionalista Democratico
Mindanao and Sulu	Lone	Ombra Amilbangsa	Nacionalista Democratico
Mindanao and Sulu	Lone	Manuel Fortich	Nacionalista Democratico
Mindanao and Sulu	Lone	Doroteo Karagdag	Nacionalista Democratico
Mindanao and Sulu	Lone	Julian A. Rodriguez	Nacionalista Democratico
Mindoro	Lone	Raul Leuterio	Nacionalista Democratico
Misamis Occidental	Lone	José Ozámiz	Nacionalista Democratico
Misamis Oriental	Lone	Segundo Gaston	Nacionalista Democrata Pro-Independencia
Mountain Province	Lone	Emiliano P. Aguirre	Nacionalista Democratico
Mountain Province	Lone	Felix P. Diaz	Nacionalista Democratico
Mountain Province	Lone	Rodolfo Hidalgo	Nacionalista Democratico
Negros Occidental	1st	Enrique Magalona	Nacionalista Democratico
Negros Occidental	2nd	Ramon Torres	Nacionalista Democratico
Negros Occidental	3rd	Agustin S. Ramos	Nacionalista Democratico
Negros Oriental	1st	Guillermo Z. Villanueva	Nacionalista Democratico
Negros Oriental	2nd	Jose E. Romero	Nacionalista Democratico
Nueva Ecija	1st	Jose Robles Jr.	Nacionalista Democrata Pro-Independencia
Nueva Ecija	2nd	Isauro Gabaldon	Nacionalista Democratico
Nueva Vizcaya	Lone	Severino Purugganan	Nacionalista Democratico
Palawan	Lone	Claudio R. Sandoval	Nacionalista Democratico
Pampanga	1st	Eligio G. Lagman (Note: Eligio G. Lagman was removed on July 16, 1935, after an electoral protest.)	Nacionalista Democrata Pro-Independencia
Pampanga	1st	Maximo Dimson (Note: Maximo Dimson replaced Eligio G. Lagman on July 16, 1935, after winning an electoral protest.)	Nacionalista Democratico
Pampanga	2nd	Jose P. Fausto	Nacionalista Democrata Pro-Independencia
Pangasinan	1st	Potenciano Pecson	Nacionalista Democratico
Pangasinan	2nd	Eugenio Perez	Nacionalista Democratico
Pangasinan	3rd	Daniel Maramba	Nacionalista Democratico
Pangasinan	4th	Cipriano Primicias Sr.	Nacionalista Democrata Pro-Independencia
Pangasinan	5th	Narciso Ramos	Nacionalista Democratico
Rizal	1st	Pedro Magsalin	Nacionalista Democratico
Rizal	2nd	Eulogio Rodriguez	Nacionalista Democratico
Romblon	Lone	Leonardo Festin	Nacionalista Democratico
Samar	1st	Antolin D. Tan	Nacionalista Democrata Pro-Independencia
Samar	2nd	Serafin S. Marabut	Nacionalista Democratico
Samar	3rd	Gerardo Morrero	Nacionalista Democratico
Sorsogon	1st	Adolfo Gerona	Nacionalista Democratico
Sorsogon	2nd	Fernando B. Duran	Nacionalista Democratico
Surigao	Lone	Ricardo Navarro	Nacionalista Democratico
Tarlac	1st	Jose Cojuangco	Nacionalista Democratico
Tarlac	2nd	Feliciano B. Gardiner	Nacionalista Democrata Pro-Independencia
Tayabas	1st	Jose A. Angara	Nacionalista Democratico
Tayabas	2nd	Antonio Z. Argosino	Sakdalista
Zambales	Lone	Felipe Estella	Nacionalista Democratico

== Changes in membership ==
=== Senate ===
District	Incumbent				Special election	Successor		
District	Senator	Party	Date	Reason	Special election	Senator	Party	Date
7th District	Potenciano Treñas	Nacionalista Democrata Pro-Independencia	June 10, 1934	Died in office	—N/a			
11th District	Jose Clarin	Nacionalista Democratico	June 2, 1935	Died in office	—N/a			

=== House of Representatives ===
District	Incumbent				Special election	Successor		
District	Member	Party	Date	Reason	Special election	Member	Party	Date
Pampanga–1st	Eligio G. Lagman	Nacionalista Democrata Pro-Independencia	July 16, 1935	Removed after an electoral protest	—N/a	Maximo Dimson	Nacionalista Democratico	July 16, 1935
Ilocos Norte–2nd	Julio Nalundasan	Nacionalista Democratico	September 20, 1935	Died in office	—N/a			

== See also ==
- 1934 Philippine legislative election
  - 1934 Philippine Senate elections
  - 1934 Philippine House of Representatives elections
