= Cavite's at-large congressional district =

Legislative district of the Philippines

Cavite's at-large congressional district refers to the lone congressional district of the Philippines in the province of Cavite for various national legislatures before 1987. The province elected its representatives province-wide at-large from its reorganization under Article 6 of the Decreto de 18 junio de 1898 y las instrucciones sobre el régimen de las provincias y pueblos for the Malolos Congress in 1898 until the creation of a first, second and third district on February 2, 1987. It was a single-member district throughout the ten legislatures of the Insular Government of the Philippine Islands from 1907 to 1935, the three legislatures of the Philippine Commonwealth from 1935 to 1946, and the first seven congresses of the republic from 1946 to 1972.

On three occasions in its history, Cavite sent more than one member to the national legislatures who were also elected at-large. Four representatives were elected to the National Assembly (Malolos Congress) of the First Philippine Republic from 1898 to 1901, two representatives to the National Assembly of the Second Philippine Republic from 1943 to 1944 (excluding Cavite City, which was represented separately), and three representatives to the Regular Batasang Pambansa of the Fourth Philippine Republic from 1984 to 1986.

After 1986, all representatives were elected from congressional districts.

== Representation history ==
#	Term of office		National Assembly	Seat A				Seat B				Seat C				Seat D			
#	Start	End	National Assembly	Image	Member	Party	Electoral history	Image	Member	Party	Electoral history	Image	Member	Party	Electoral history	Image	Member	Party	Electoral history
=== Cavite's at-large district for the Malolos Congress ===
District created June 18, 1898.
–	September 15, 1898	March 23, 1901	1st		Severino de las Alas	Nonpartisan	Elected in 1898.		José Basa	Nonpartisan	Elected in 1898.		Hugo Ilagan	Nonpartisan	Elected in 1898.		José Salamanca	Nonpartisan	Elected in 1898.
#	Term of office		Legislature	Single seat				Seats eliminated											
#	Start	End	Legislature	Image	Member	Party	Electoral history	Seats eliminated											
=== Cavite's at-large district for the Philippine Assembly ===								Seats eliminated											
District re-created January 9, 1907.								Seats eliminated											
1	October 16, 1907	July 1, 1908	1st		Rafael Palma	Nacionalista	Elected in 1907. Resigned on appointment as Philippine commissioner.	Seats eliminated											
2	January 19, 1909	October 16, 1912	1st		Emiliano Tria Tirona	Nacionalista	Elected in 1909 to finish Palma's term.	Seats eliminated											
2	January 19, 1909	October 16, 1912	2nd		Emiliano Tria Tirona	Independent	Re-elected in 1909.	Seats eliminated											
3	October 16, 1912	October 16, 1916	3rd		Florentino Joya	Nacionalista	Elected in 1912.	Seats eliminated											
#	Term of office		Legislature	Single seat				Seats eliminated											
#	Start	End	Legislature	Image	Member	Party	Electoral history	Seats eliminated											
=== Cavite's at-large district for the House of Representatives of the Philippine Islands ===								Seats eliminated											
(2)	October 16, 1916	June 3, 1919	4th		Emiliano Tría Tirona	Independent	Elected in 1916.	Seats eliminated											
(2)	October 16, 1916	June 3, 1919	4th		Emiliano Tría Tirona	Demócrata	Elected in 1916.	Seats eliminated											
4	June 3, 1919	June 6, 1922	5th		Emilio P. Virata	Nacionalista	Elected in 1919.	Seats eliminated											
5	June 6, 1922	June 2, 1925	6th		Pedro F. Espíritu	Demócrata	Elected in 1922.	Seats eliminated											
6	June 2, 1925	July 3, 1925	7th		Augusto A. Reyes	Nacionalista; Consolidado	Elected in 1925. Died.	Seats eliminated											
7	August 15, 1925	June 15, 1929	7th		Antero Soriano	Nacionalista; Consolidado	Elected in 1925 to finish Reyes's term.	Seats eliminated											
7	August 15, 1925	June 15, 1929	8th		Antero Soriano	Nacionalista; Consolidado	Re-elected in 1928. Died.	Seats eliminated											
8	August 24, 1929	June 2, 1931	8th		Fidel Ibáñez	Nacionalista; Consolidado	Elected in 1929 to finish Soriano's term.	Seats eliminated											
(2)	June 2, 1931	June 5, 1934	9th		Emiliano Tría Tirona	Demócrata	Elected in 1931.	Seats eliminated											
9	June 5, 1934	September 16, 1935	10th		Francisco Arca	Nacionalista; Democrático	Elected in 1934.	Seats eliminated											
#	Term of office		National Assembly	Single seat				Seats eliminated											
#	Start	End	National Assembly	Image	Member	Party	Electoral history	Seats eliminated											
=== Cavite's at-large district for the National Assembly (Commonwealth of the Philippines) ===								Seats eliminated											
10	September 16, 1935	October 11, 1939	1st		Justiniano Montano	Nacionalista; Democrático	Elected in 1935.	Seats eliminated											
10	September 16, 1935	October 11, 1939	2nd		Justiniano Montano	Nacionalista	Re-elected in 1938. Election annulled after an electoral protest.	Seats eliminated											
11	November 2, 1939	December 30, 1941	2nd		Manuel S. Rojas	Nacionalista	Declared winner of 1938 elections.												
#	Term of office		National Assembly	Seat A				Seat B				Seats restored							
#	Start	End	National Assembly	Image	Member	Party	Electoral history	Image	Member	Party	Electoral history	Seats restored							
=== Cavite's at-large district for the National Assembly (Second Philippine Republic) ===												Seats restored							
District re-created September 7, 1943.												Seats restored							
–	September 25, 1943	February 2, 1944	1st		Emiliano Tria Tirona	KALIBAPI	Elected in 1943.		Luís Y. Ferrer	KALIBAPI	Appointed as an ex officio member.	Seats restored							
#	Term of office		Common wealth Congress	Single seat				Seats eliminated											
#	Start	End	Common wealth Congress	Image	Member	Party	Electoral history	Seats eliminated											
=== Cavite's at-large district for the House of Representatives of the Commonwealth of the Philippines ===								Seats eliminated											
District re-created May 24, 1945.								Seats eliminated											
(10)	June 9, 1945	May 25, 1946	1st		Justiniano Montano	Nacionalista	Elected in 1941.	Seats eliminated											
#	Term of office		Congress	Single seat				Seats eliminated											
#	Start	End	Congress	Image	Member	Party	Electoral history	Seats eliminated											
=== Cavite's at-large district for the House of Representatives of the Philippines ===								Seats eliminated											
(10)	May 25, 1946	December 30, 1949	1st		Justiniano Montano	Nacionalista	Re-elected in 1946.	Seats eliminated											
(11)	December 30, 1949	December 30, 1953	2nd		Manuel S. Rojas	Liberal	Elected in 1949.	Seats eliminated											
12	December 30, 1953	December 30, 1957	3rd		José T. Cajulis	Nacionalista	Elected in 1953.	Seats eliminated											
(10)	December 30, 1957	September 23, 1972	4th		Justiniano Montano	Nacionalista	Elected in 1957.	Seats eliminated											
(10)	December 30, 1957	September 23, 1972	5th		Justiniano Montano	Nacionalista	Re-elected in 1961.	Seats eliminated											
(10)	December 30, 1957	September 23, 1972	6th		Justiniano Montano	Nacionalista	Re-elected in 1965.	Seats eliminated											
(10)	December 30, 1957	September 23, 1972	7th		Justiniano Montano	Liberal	Re-elected in 1969. Removed from office after imposition of martial law.	Seats eliminated											
District dissolved into the twenty-seat Region IV-A's at-large district for the Interim Batasang Pambansa.								Seats eliminated											
#	Term of office		Batasang Pambansa	Seat A				Seat B				Seat C				Seats restored			
#	Start	End	Batasang Pambansa	Image	Member	Party	Electoral history	Image	Member	Party	Electoral history	Image	Member	Party	Electoral history	Seats restored			
=== Cavite's at-large district for the Regular Batasang Pambansa ===																Seats restored			
District re-created February 1, 1984.																Seats restored			
–	July 23, 1984	March 25, 1986	2nd		Helena Benitez	KBL	Elected in 1984.		Renato P. Dragon	KBL	Elected in 1984.		Cesar Virata	KBL	Elected in 1984.	Seats restored			
District dissolved into Cavite's 1st, 2nd and 3rd districts.																Seats restored			

== See also ==
- Legislative districts of Cavite
