= Pedro Guevara =

Filipino soldier, lawyer, legislator, and Spanish-language writer

The Honorable Pedro Guevara
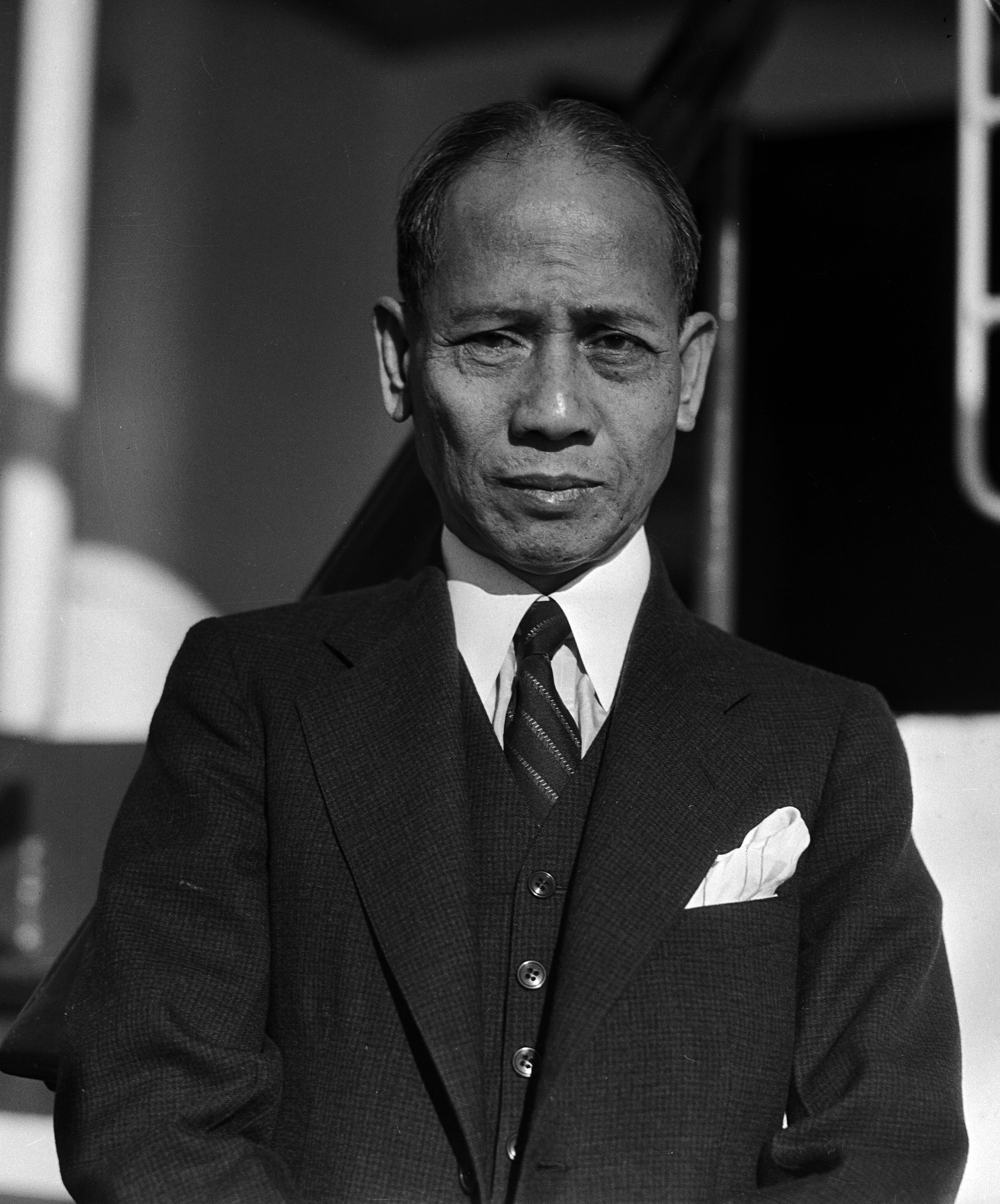

Resident Commissioner to the U.S. House of Representatives from the Philippine Islands
- In office March 4, 1923 – February 14, 1936 Serving with Isauro Gabaldon (1923-1929); Camilo Osías (1929-1935); Francisco Afan Delgado (1935-1936)
- Preceded by: Jaime C. De Veyra
- Succeeded by: Quintin Paredes

Senator of the Philippines from the 4th district
- In office 1916–1923 Serving with Rafael Palma (1916–1922) and Emiliano Tría Tirona (1922–1923)
- Preceded by: Post created
- Succeeded by: Ramon J. Fernandez

Member of the Philippine National Assembly from La Laguna's 2nd District
- In office 1909–1916
- Preceded by: Crispin Oben
- Succeeded by: Crisanto Guysayko

Municipal Councilor of San Felipe Neri
- In office 1907–1909

Personal details
- Born: Pedro Guevara y Valenzuela; February 23, 1879 Santa Cruz, La Laguna, Captaincy General of the Philippines
- Died: January 19, 1938 (aged 58) Manila, Philippine Commonwealth
- Resting place: Loyola Memorial Park, Marikina, Philippines
- Party: Nacionalista
- Spouse: Isidra Baldomero
- Children: 1
- Education: Ateneo Municipal de Manila
- Alma mater: Colegio de San Juan de Letran

Military service
- Allegiance: First Philippine Republic
- Rank: Lieutenant colonel
- Battles/wars: Philippine Revolution; Spanish–American War; Philippine–American War

Pedro Guevara y Valenzuela (February 23, 1879 – January 19, 1938), was a Filipino soldier, lawyer, legislator, and Spanish-language writer who became Resident Commissioner of the Philippines during the American occupation.

== Early life and education ==
Pedro Guevara was born in Santa Cruz, La Laguna (now Laguna), Philippines on February 23, 1879, to Miguel Guevara and María Valenzuela. Guevara attended Ateneo Municipal de Manila and graduated from Colegio de San Juan de Letran, Manila in 1896.

== Philippine Revolution ==
Guevara joined the Filipino forces during the Philippine Revolution and assisted in promoting the peace agreement of the Biak na Bato at San Miguel, Bulacan, in 1897. He later rejoined the Filipino forces during the revolution and served throughout the Spanish–American War and the Philippine–American War, attaining the rank of lieutenant colonel. He was the aide and private secretary to General Juan Cailles.

== Political career ==
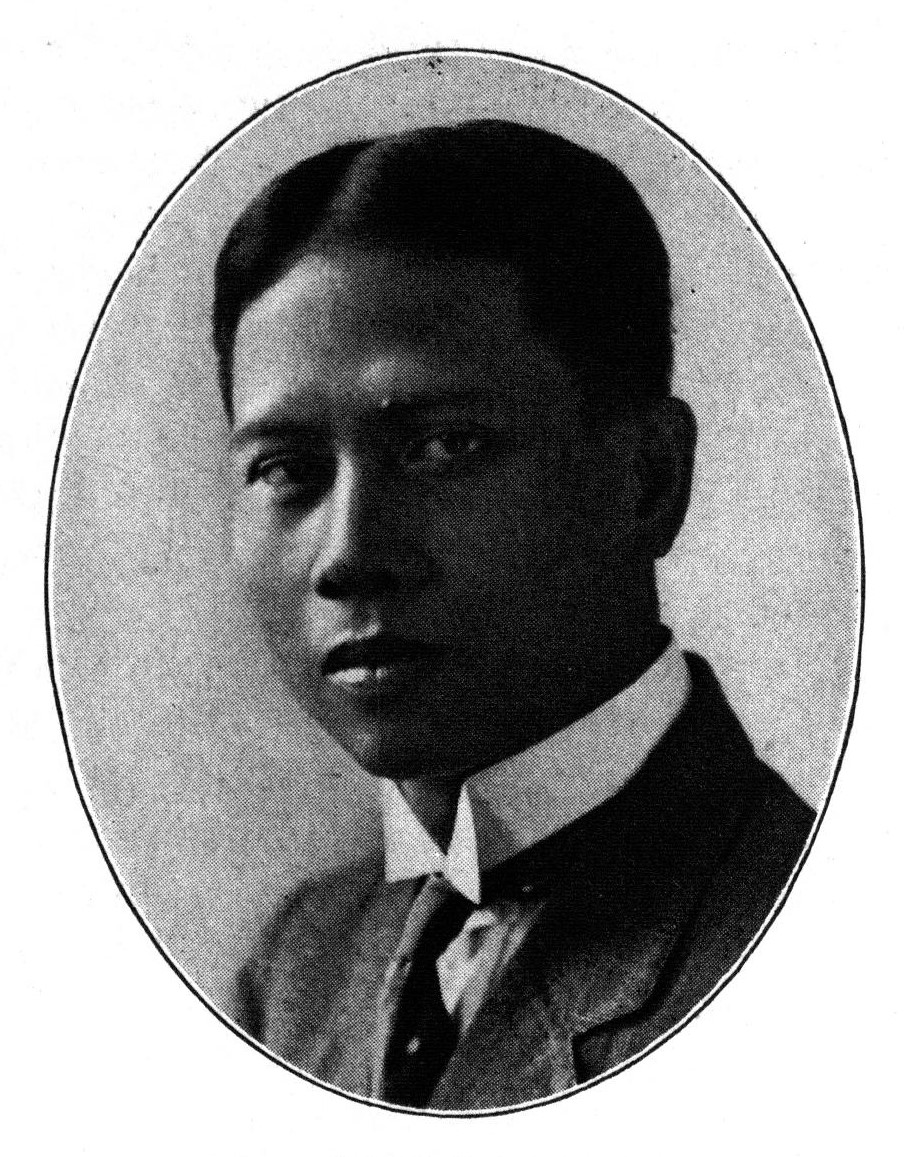
Guevara, c. 1917

Later, Guevara became a journalist for the Spanish-language newspaper Soberania Nacional and Vidas Filipinas. He entered politics as a municipal councilor of San Felipe Neri, Rizal (present-day city of Mandaluyong, Metro Manila) in 1907. He studied law at La Jurisprudencia and became a lawyer in private practice. He later became a member of the Philippine House of Representatives from the 2nd district of La Laguna from 1909 to 1912 and a member of the Philippine Senate from the 4th senatorial district from 1916 to 1923. In 1921, Guevara was chair of the Philippine delegation to the Far Eastern Bar Conference at Beijing, China.

He gave up his Senate seat in 1923, less than two years before his second term expired, as he was elected as a Nationalist resident commissioner to the House of Representatives of the United States Congress. He would serve for four three-year terms from March 4, 1923, to February 14, 1936. During this time, Guevara worked tirelessly for the approval of the Tydings–McDuffie Act, which would establish the Commonwealth of the Philippines and eventually its independence in 10 years. Later, he served as delegate of Laguna during the Constitutional Convention of 1934 which framed the 1935 Philippine Constitution. His term ended on February 14, 1936, when a successor qualified in accordance with the newly established Commonwealth of the Philippines was selected.

== Later life and death ==
Upon retirement, Guevara resumed his law practice. He died of a heart attack in Manila on January 19, 1938, and was buried at the Manila North Cemetery. In 1993, his remains were transferred to Loyola Memorial Park in Marikina.

== Gallery ==
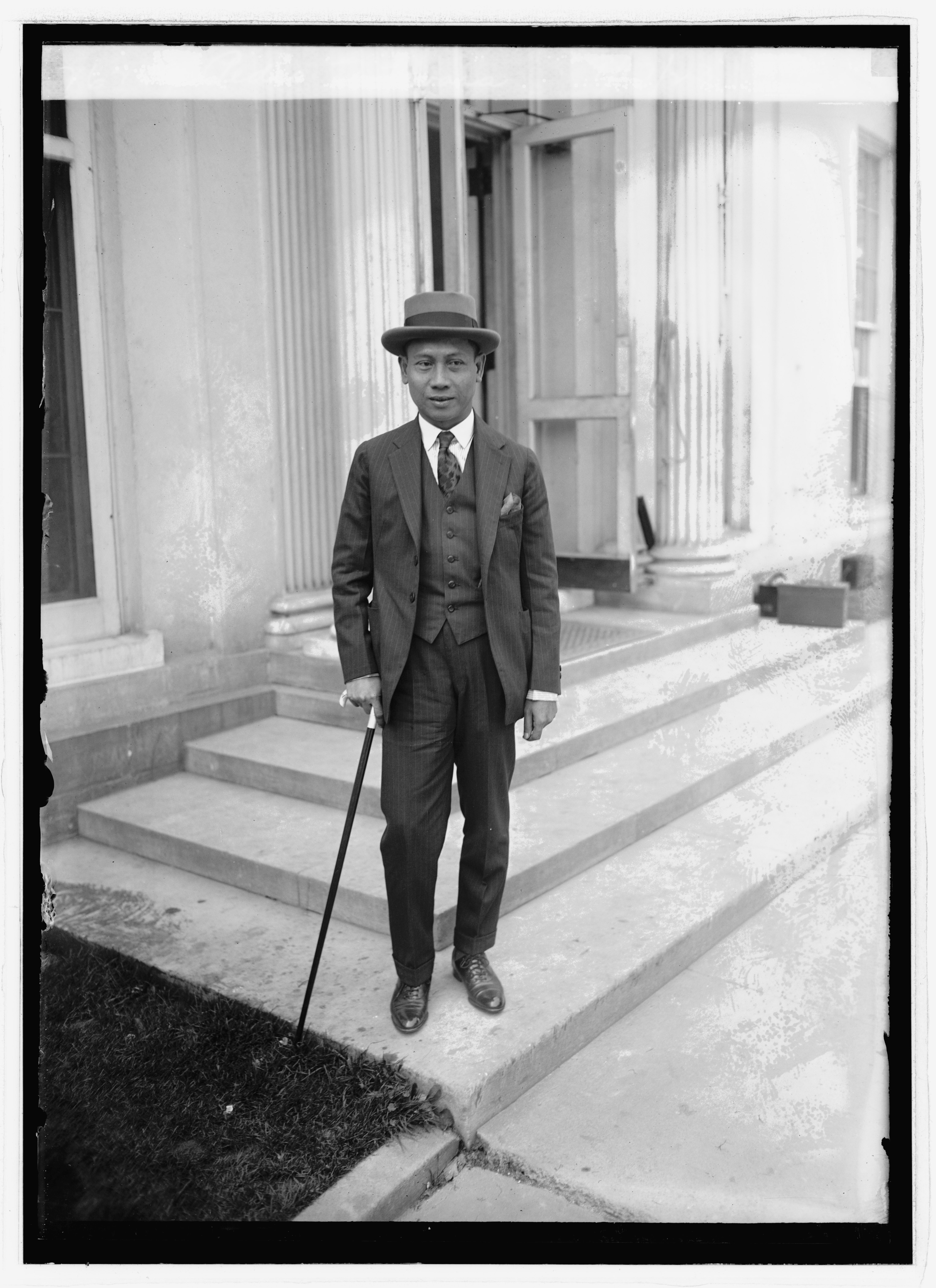
Guevara in Washington, D.C.

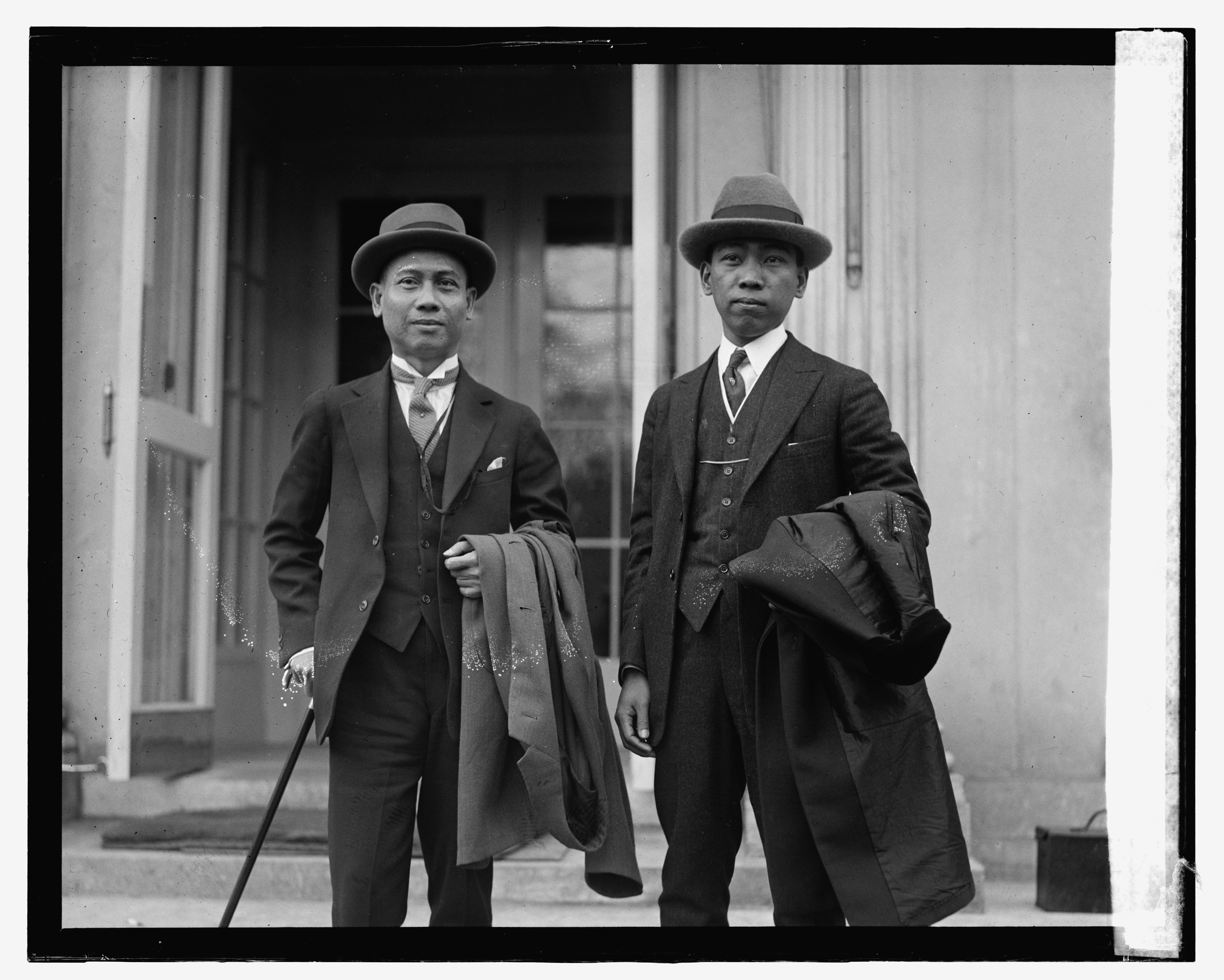
Guevara (left) with J.E. Espinosa (right) in the U.S.

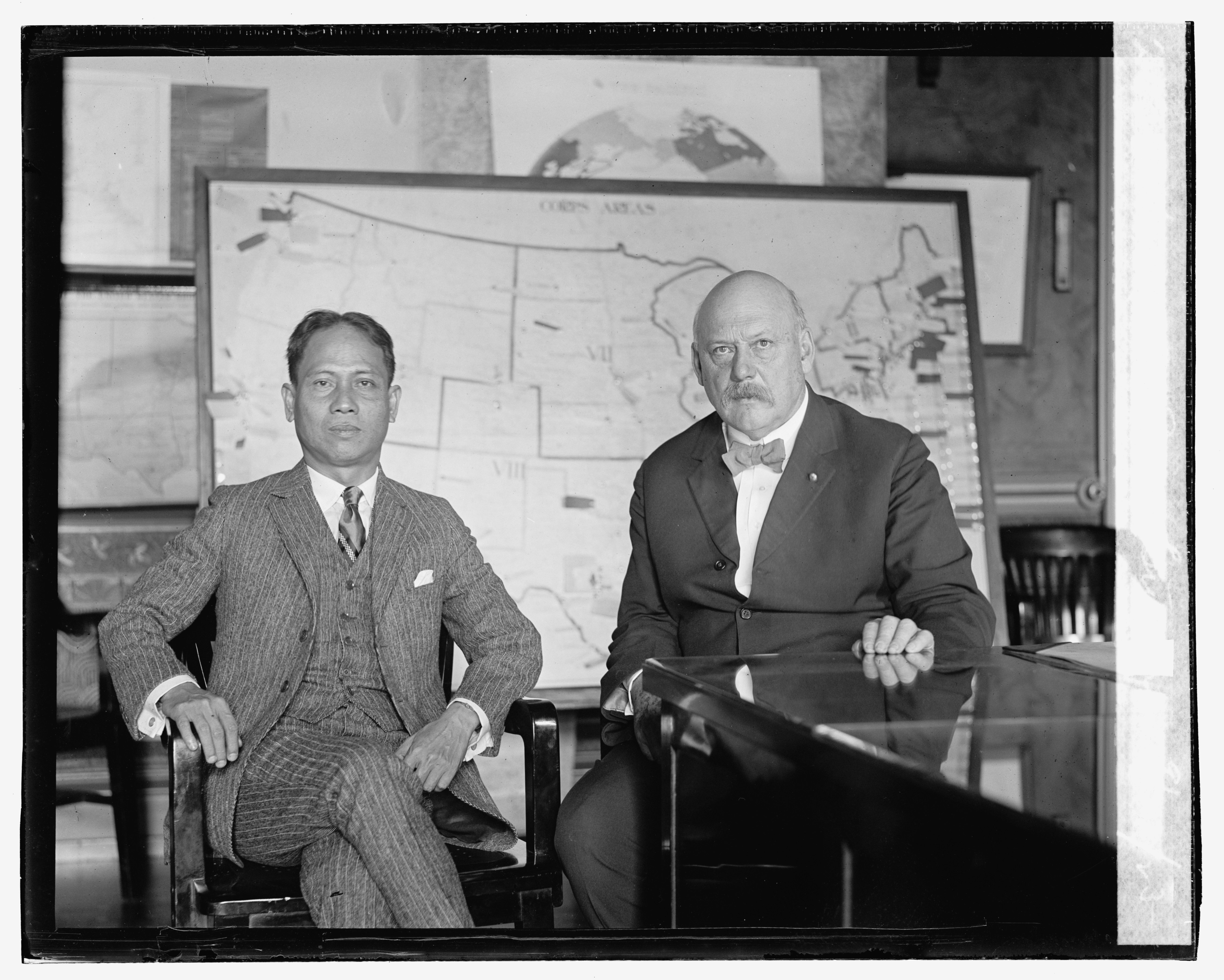
Guevara (left) in 1923

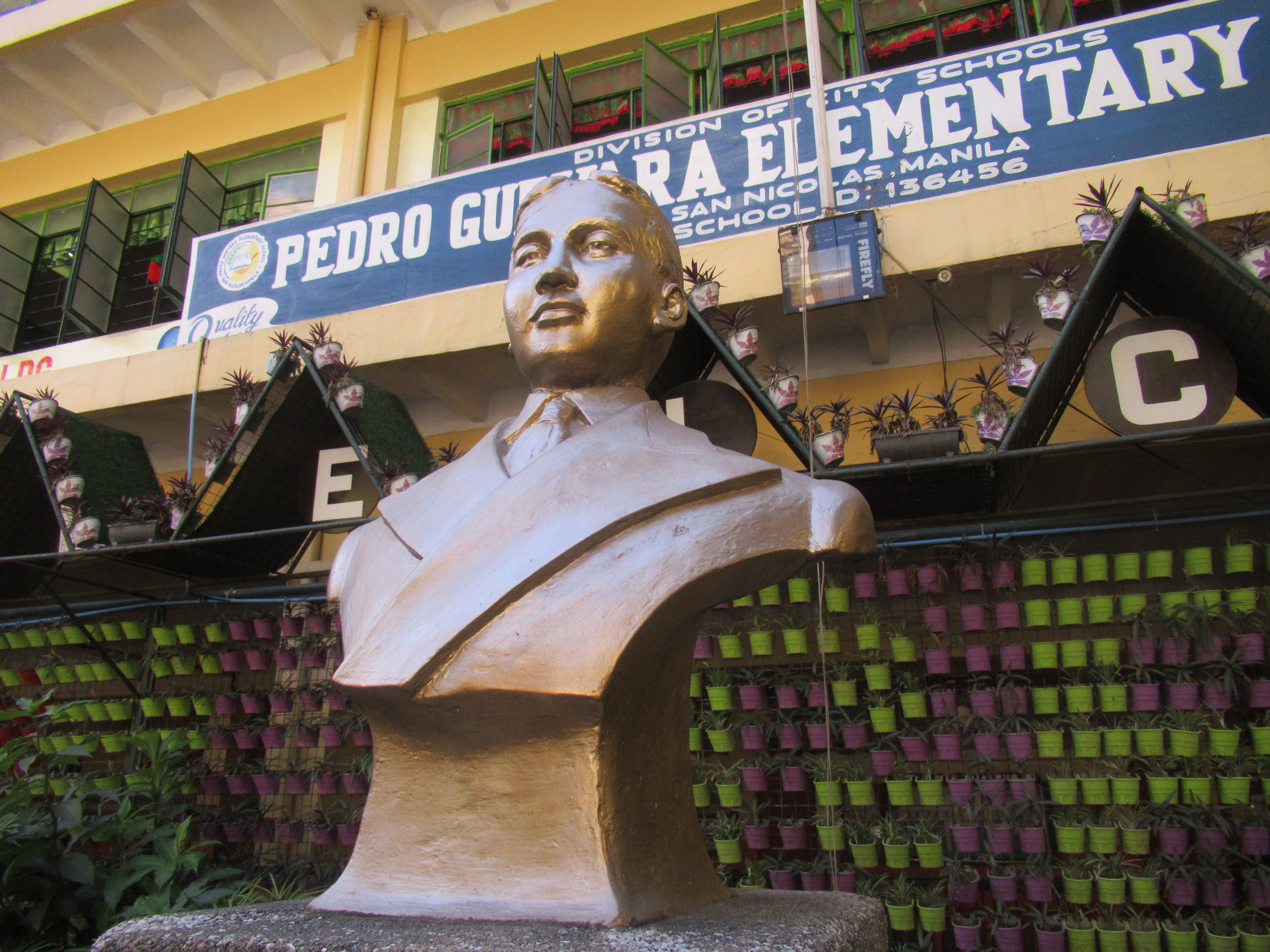
Bust of Guevara at Pedro Guevara Elementary School, San Nicolas, Manila

== See also ==
- Laguna State Polytechnic University
- List of Asian Americans and Pacific Islands Americans in the United States Congress

Senate of the Philippines
| New seat | Senator of the Philippines from the 4th district 1916–1923 | Succeeded by Ramon J. Fernandez |
U.S. House of Representatives
| Preceded by Jaime C. de Veyra | Resident Commissioner from the Philippines to the United States Congress; 1923–1936 | Succeeded by Quintin Paredes |
