= Philippines's 4th senatorial district =

- Former constituency for the Senate of the Philippines
- Provinces / Cities: Bataan, Laguna, Manila, Rizal
- Population: 982,720 (1935)
- Electorate: 241,389 (1935)

Former constituency
- Created: 1916
- Abolished: 1934

Philippines's 4th senatorial district, officially the Fourth Senatorial District of the Philippine Islands (Spanish: Cuarto Distrito Senatorial de las Islas Filipinas), was one of the twelve senatorial districts of the Philippines in existence between 1916 and 1935. It elected two members to the Senate of the Philippines, the upper chamber of the bicameral Philippine Legislature under the Insular Government of the Philippine Islands for each of the 4th to 10th legislatures. The district was created under the 1916 Jones Law from the capital Manila and adjacent provinces in south-central Luzon, namely Bataan, Laguna and Rizal.

The district was represented by a total of seven senators throughout its existence. It was abolished in 1935 when a unicameral National Assembly was installed under a new constitution following the passage of the Tydings–McDuffie Act which established the Commonwealth of the Philippines. Since the 1941 elections when the Senate was restored after a constitutional plebiscite, all twenty-four members of the upper house have been elected countrywide at-large. It was last represented by Juan Nolasco and Juan Sumulong of the Nacionalista Democrático.

== List of senators ==
Seat A							Legislature	Seat B						
#	Image	Senator	Term of office		Party	Electoral history	Legislature	#	Image	Senator	Term of office		Party	Electoral history
#	Image	Senator	Start	End	Party	Electoral history	Legislature	#	Image	Senator	Start	End	Party	Electoral history
1		Rafael Palma	October 16, 1916	June 6, 1922	Nacionalista	Elected in 1916.	4th	1		Pedro Guevara	October 16, 1916	March 4, 1923	Nacionalista	Elected in 1916.
1		Rafael Palma	October 16, 1916	June 6, 1922	Nacionalista	Elected in 1916.	5th	1		Pedro Guevara	October 16, 1916	March 4, 1923	Nacionalista	Re-elected in 1919. Resigned on appointment as Resident Commissioner.
2		Emiliano Tria Tirona	June 6, 1922	June 5, 1928	Demócrata	Elected in 1922.	6th	1		Pedro Guevara	October 16, 1916	March 4, 1923	Nacionalista; Colectivista	Re-elected in 1919. Resigned on appointment as Resident Commissioner.
2		Emiliano Tria Tirona	June 6, 1922	June 5, 1928	Demócrata	Elected in 1922.	6th	2		Ramon J. Fernandez	October 3, 1923	June 2, 1925	Nacionalista; Colectivista	Elected in 1923 to finish Guevara's term.
2		Emiliano Tria Tirona	June 6, 1922	June 5, 1928	Demócrata	Elected in 1922.	7th	3		Juan Sumulong	June 2, 1925	June 2, 1931	Demócrata	Elected in 1925.
3		José G. Generoso	June 5, 1928	June 5, 1934	Demócrata	Elected in 1928.	8th	3		Juan Sumulong	June 2, 1925	June 2, 1931	Demócrata	Elected in 1925.
3		José G. Generoso	June 5, 1928	June 5, 1934	Demócrata	Elected in 1928.	9th	4		Juan G. Nolasco	June 2, 1931	September 16, 1935	Nacionalista; Consolidado	Elected in 1931.
4		Juan Sumulong	June 5, 1934	September 16, 1935	Nacionalista; Democrático	Elected in 1934.	10th	4		Juan G. Nolasco	June 2, 1931	September 16, 1935	Nacionalista; Democrático	Elected in 1931.

== See also ==
- Senatorial districts of the Philippines
