= Jose Generoso =

Filipino politician and judge

Jose G. Generoso
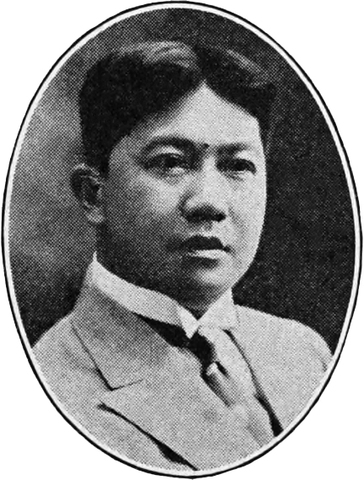
- Generoso as member of the Philippine House of Representatives, c. 1921

41st Associate Justice of the Supreme Court of the Philippines
- In office May 11, 1942 – July 15, 1948
- Appointed by: Manuel L. Quezon
- Preceded by: Anacleto Diaz
- Succeeded by: Alejandro Reyes

Senator of the Philippines from the 4th District
- In office June 5, 1928 – June 5, 1934
- Preceded by: Emiliano Tria Tirona
- Succeeded by: Juan Sumulong

Member of the House of Representatives from Manila's 2nd District
- In office October 16, 1916 – June 6, 1922
- Preceded by: Luciano de la Rosa
- Succeeded by: Alfonso Mendoza

Personal details
- Born: September 19, 1881 Quiapo, Manila, Captaincy General of the Philippines
- Died: March 12, 1959 (aged 77) Manila, Philippines
- Party: Democrata
- Spouse: Patrocinio Guevara
- Profession: Lawyer

José G. Generoso y Hernández (September 19, 1881 – March 12, 1959) was a Filipino politician and lawyer during the American occupation.

== Career ==
Generoso worked as a law professor before joining politics as a member of the House of Representatives for the 2nd district of Manila from 1916 to 1919 and a Senator for the 4th District composed of Manila, Bataan, Laguna and Rizal from 1928 to 1934. During the Commonwealth era, he served as Technical Assistant and Special Counsel to President Manuel Quezon and was a judge at the Court of Industrial Relations.

During the Japanese occupation of the Philippines during the Second World War, he was appointed as an Associate Justice of the Supreme Court by the Japanese-installed Philippine Executive Commission in 1942.
