= Rafael Palma =

Filipino writer, educator, and politician

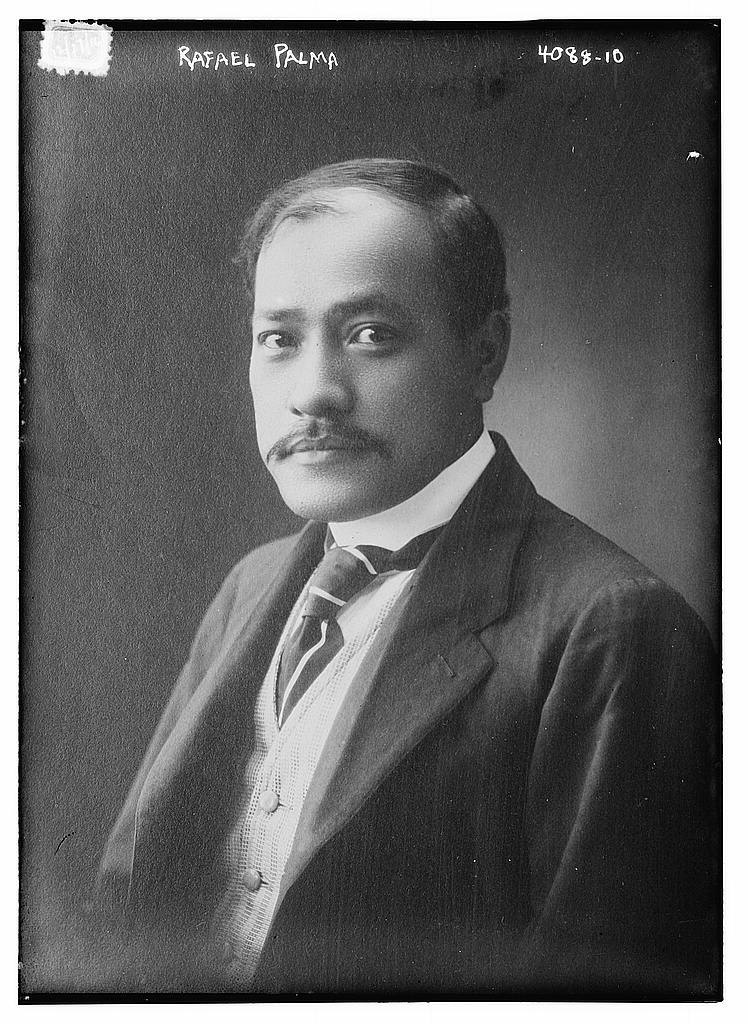
- Palma in c. 1915

President pro tempore of the Senate of the Philippines
- In office October 16, 1916 – c. 1919
- Preceded by: Position established
- Succeeded by: Espiridion Guanco

4th President of the University of the Philippines
- In office 1925–1933
- Preceded by: Guy Potter Benton
- Succeeded by: Jorge Bocobo

Senator of the Philippines from the 4th Senatorial District
- In office October 16, 1916 – June 6, 1922 Serving with Pedro Guevara
- Preceded by: Post created
- Succeeded by: Emiliano Tría Tirona

Secretary of the Interior
- In office January 11, 1917 – July 7, 1920
- Appointed by: Francis Burton Harrison
- Preceded by: Winfred Thaxter Denison; Francis Burton Harrison (acting)
- Succeeded by: Teodoro Kalaw

Member of the Second Philippine Commission
- In office July 6, 1908 – October 16, 1916
- Appointed by: James Francis Smith

Member of the Philippine Assembly from Cavite
- In office October 16, 1907 – July 1, 1908
- Preceded by: Post created
- Succeeded by: Emiliano Tría Tirona

Personal details
- Born: Rafael Palma y Velásquez; October 24, 1874 Tondo, Manila, Captaincy General of the Philippines
- Died: May 24, 1939 (aged 64) Manila, Philippine Commonwealth
- Party: Nacionalista
- Spouse: Carolina Ocampo
- Education: Ateneo de Manila University; University of Santo Tomas

Rafael Palma y Velásquez (Spanish: [rafaˈel ˈpalma]: October 24, 1874 – May 24, 1939) was a Filipino politician, Rizalian, writer, educator and a famous Freemason. He was a senator from 1916 to 1921 and was the fourth president of the University of the Philippines.

== Biography ==
Palma was born in Manila on October 24, 1874, to Don Hermógenes Palma, a clerk at the Intendencia Office, and Hilaria Velásquez. His younger brother was the soldier-poet José Palma, the author of the Spanish poem Filipinas, which is, along with its subsequent translations, used in the Philippine National Anthem.

In 1885, he began his studies at the Ateneo de Manila and graduated with a Bachelor of Arts degree. In 1892, he began his law studies at the University of Santo Tomas. While enrolled in the university, he was employed in the Office of the Bureau of Lands.

He was also a reporter in La Independencia, the first Filipino daily newspaper, founded and directed by Antonio Luna. When Luna died in 1899, Palma assumed the paper's editorship. Aside from La Independencia, he was also involved in other papers, writing for La Patria, among others; and co-founding, along with Sergio Osmeña and Jaime de Veyra, El Nuevo Día, the first daily newspaper in Cebu.

In 1901, he passed the bar examinations. That same year, he founded the newspaper El Renacimiento, which was first published on September 3. He married Carolina Ocampo in February 1902. He left the newspaper work in 1903 and practiced law while also teaching at the Escuela de Derecho.

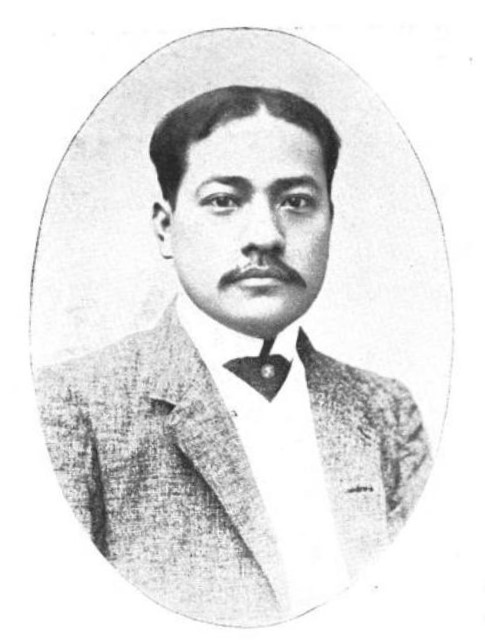
Palma as a member of the Philippine Assembly in 1908

He started politics when he became a member and secretary of the Association of Peace. In the 1907 Philippine Assembly elections, he ran and subsequently won as an assemblyman representing the province of Cavite. On July 6, 1908, Governor-General James A. Smith appointed him as a member of the second Philippine Commission, becoming the youngest member to serve up to 1916. In the 1916 Philippine Senate elections, he was elected as a senator, representing the 4th district. He was unanimously elected as the Senate's first president pro tempore.

In September 1916, he was appointed by Governor-General Francis B. Harrison, through Executive Order No. 64, as Secretary of the Interior and served until his resignation in July 1920. In July 1925, he was inaugurated as the fourth president of the University of the Philippines. He served as UP president up until 1933 when he resigned due to the Hare-Hawes-Cutting bill controversy wherein then-Senate president Manuel Quezon threatened to cut the university's appropriations due to Palma's championing of the law. He then again ran for senator but lost to Juan Sumulong. In 1934, Palma was elected to the 1934 Constitutional Convention.

In the later years of his life, Palma was appointed by President Quezon as chairman of the National Board of Education. He held that position until his death in Manila on May 24, 1939, at the age of 64.

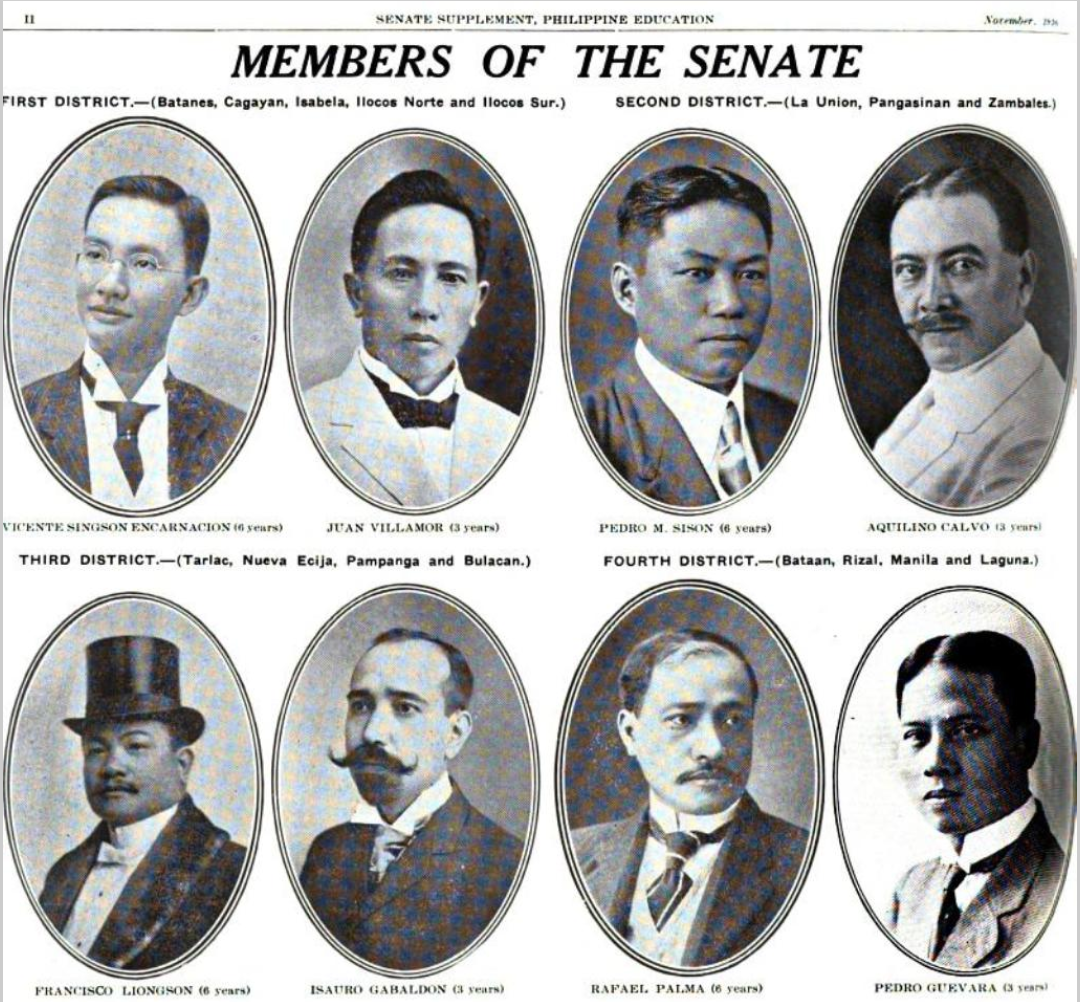
Palma as a Member of the Philippine Senate

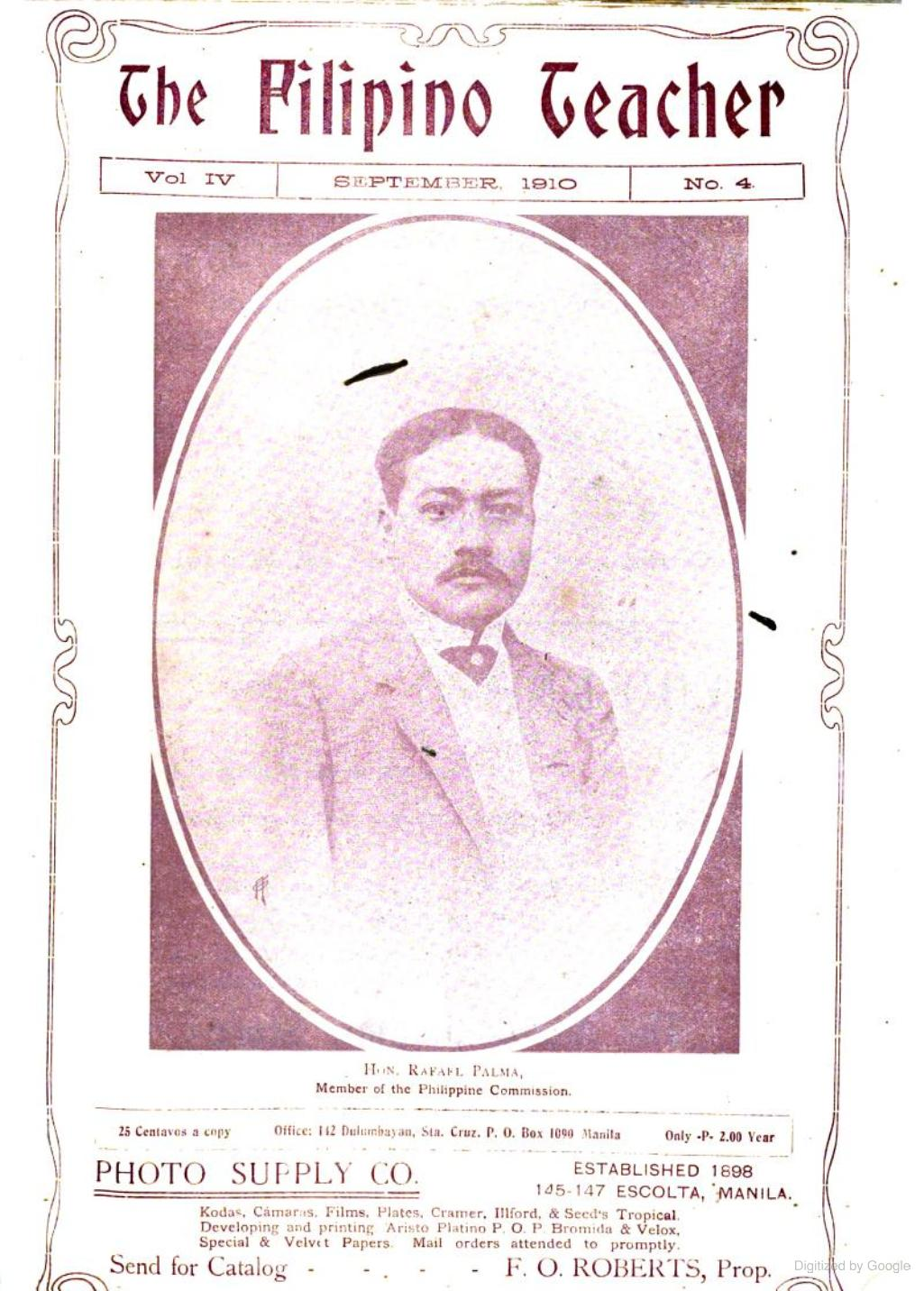
Palma as member of the Philippine Commission, from The Filipino Teacher dated September 1910

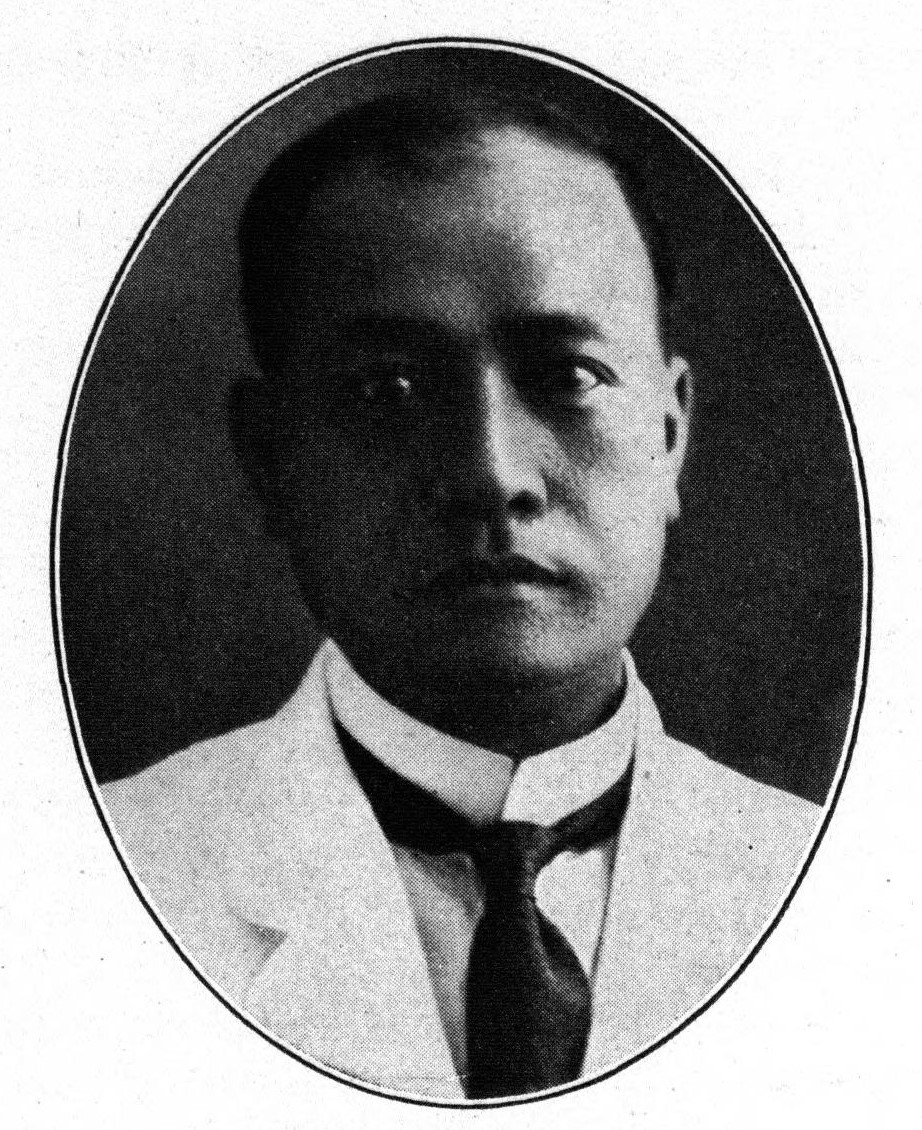
Palma in c. 1917

== Honors ==
=== Books ===
- The Pride of the Malay Race, the English translation by Justice Román Ozaeta of Palma's biography of Filipino national hero José Rizal.
- The Woman and the Right to Vote
- The New Mentality, 1929.

=== Places named after him ===
- Barangay Rafael Palma, Diffun, Quirino
- The building presently occupied by the Department of Justice and first named as University Hall was also previously named Palma Hall. A historical marker on the life of Rafael Palma is located on its ground floor.
- Palma Hall, which houses the College of Social Sciences and Philosophy of the University of the Philippines–Diliman, was named after him.
- University of Bohol, a private school in Tagbilaran, Bohol, was named the Rafael Palma College in 1946 until it was given its present name.
- Palma Bridge, University of the Philippines Los Baños
- There are many other schools in the country that are named after Rafael Palma, such as Rafael Palma Elementary School in Pasay and Rafael Palma Elementary School along Zobel Roxas Street (under the jurisdiction of Manila but geographically located in Makati).
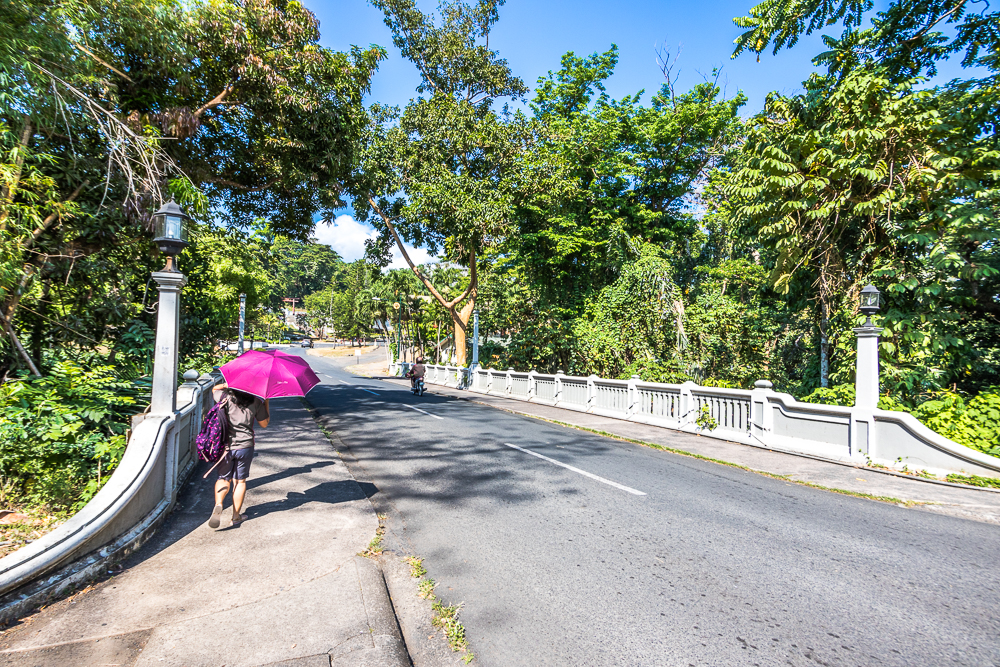
Palma Bridge

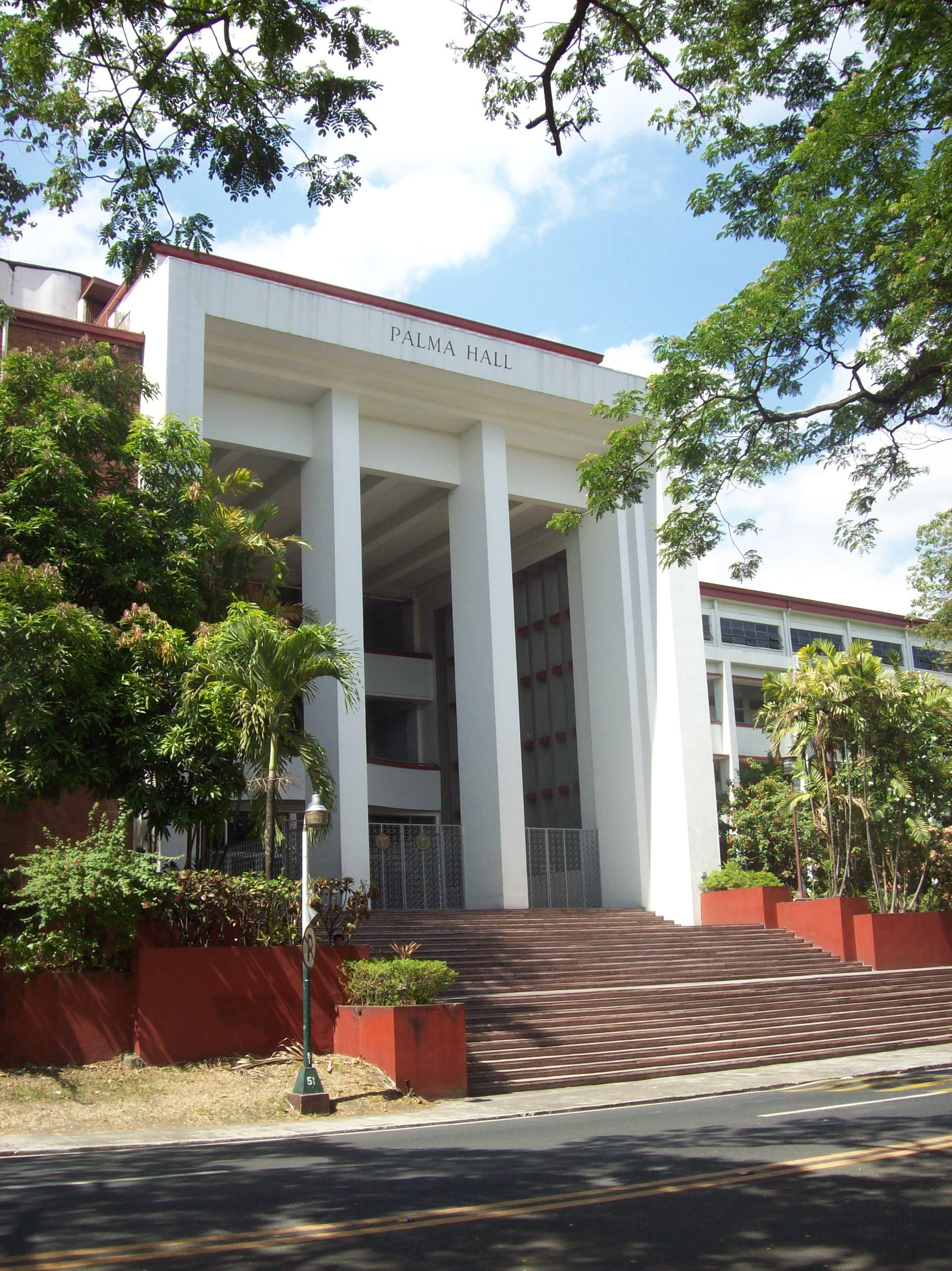
Palma Hall Building

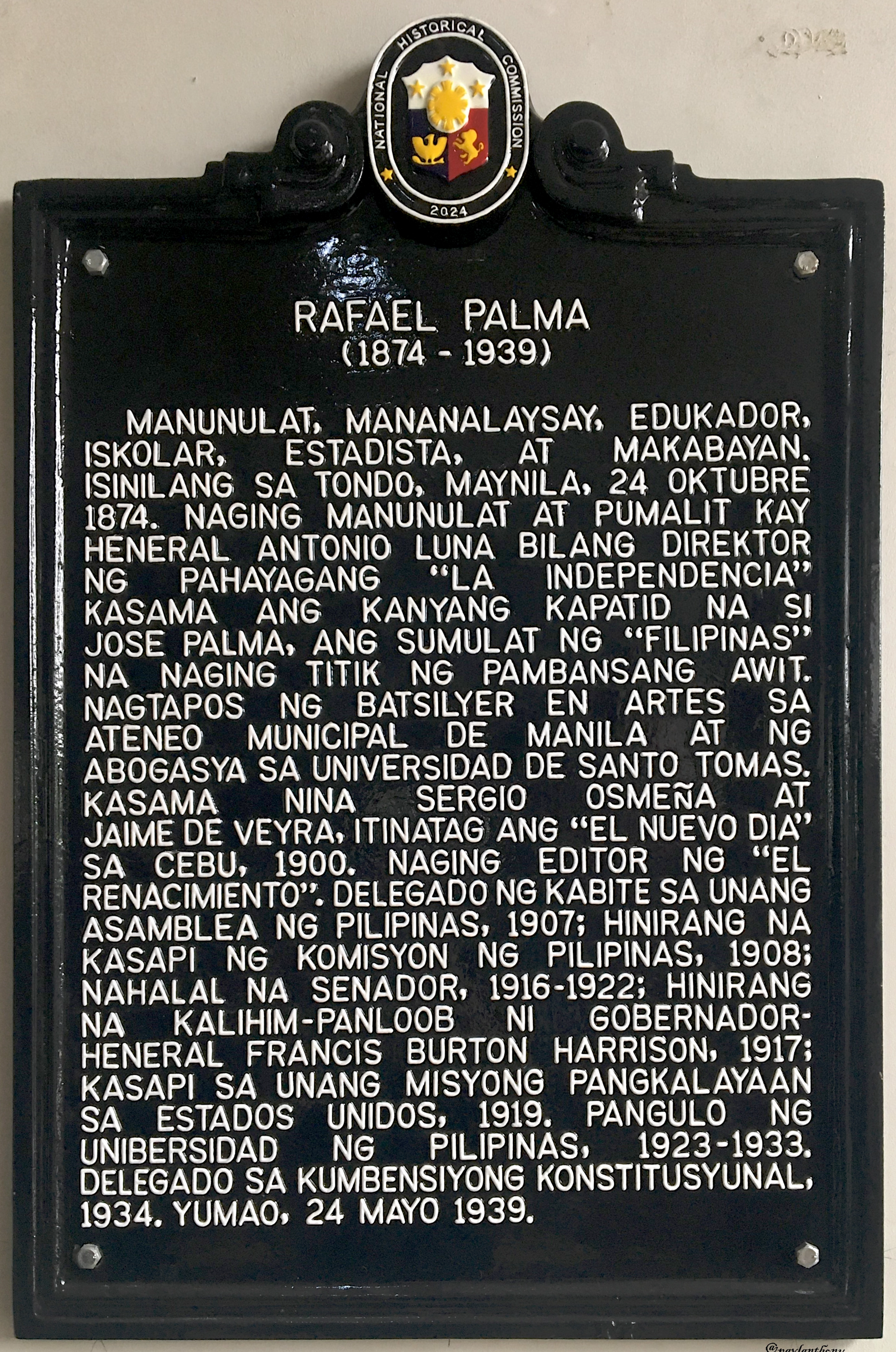
Rafael Palma Historical Marker installed by National Historical Commission of the Philippines in 2024 in Palma Hall, University of the Philippines Diliman
