= Emiliano Tría Tirona =

Filipino lawyer and politician (1883-1952)

The Honorable Emiliano Tría Tirona
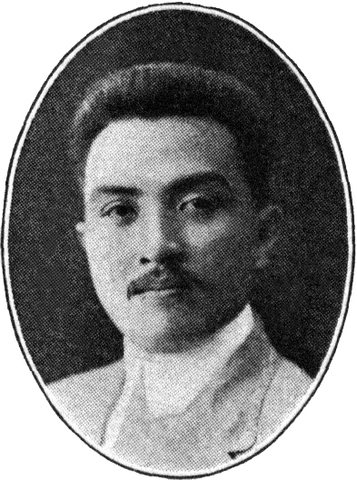
- Tría Tirona as member of the Philippine House of Representatives, c. 1917

Senator of the Philippines
- In office July 9, 1945 – April 8, 1952
- Constituency: At-large
- In office June 6, 1922 – June 5, 1928
- Preceded by: Rafael Palma
- Succeeded by: Jose Generoso
- Constituency: 4th District

Member of the National Assembly (Second Philippine Republic) from Cavite
- In office October 17, 1943 – February 2, 1944 Serving with Luis Ferrer

Member of the House of Representatives from Cavite's at-large district Member of the Philippine Assembly (1909–1912)
- In office June 2, 1931 – June 5, 1934
- Preceded by: Fidel Ibáñez
- Succeeded by: Francisco Arca
- In office October 16, 1916 – June 3, 1919
- Preceded by: Florentino Joya
- Succeeded by: Emilio Virata
- In office January 19, 1909 – October 16, 1912
- Preceded by: Rafael Palma
- Succeeded by: Florentino Joya

Personal details
- Born: Emiliano Tría Tirona y Alegre; June 12, 1883 Cavite El Viejo, Cavite, Captaincy General of the Philippines
- Died: April 8, 1952 (aged 68) Santa Cruz, Manila, Philippines
- Cause of death: Lung cancer
- Party: Liberal (1947–1952); Nacionalista (until 1909, c. 1910, 1935–1947); KALIBAPI (1942–1945); Democrata (1917–1935); Independent (1909–1917)
- Education: Escuela de Derecho de Manila
- Occupation: Politician
- Profession: Lawyer

Emiliano Alegre Tría Tirona (born Emiliano Tría Tirona y Alegre; June 12, 1883 - April 8, 1952) was a Filipino lawyer and politician who was a member of the Philippine Assembly from 1909 to 1912, of the House of Representatives from 1916 to 1919 and from 1931 to 1934, and of the Senate from 1922 to 1928 and from 1941 to 1952. During the Japanese-sponsored Second Philippine Republic from 1943 to 1945, he was also Minister for Health, Labor and Public Education in the government of President Jose P. Laurel.

== Early life and career ==
Tirona was born in Cavite El Viejo (present-day Kawit), Cavite in 1882. After attending the Ateneo Municipal de Manila and the Instituto Burgos in Malolos, Tirona began an undergraduate course at the Escuela de Derecho de Manila, graduating in 1902 with a Bachelor of Arts degree. He then completed a law degree at the Escuela de Derecho de Manila in 1905 with a Bachelor of Laws degree and after being admitted to the Bar, began working as a lawyer. He completed another postgraduate law degree with a Master of Laws. In 1906, he first became secretary of the Instituto Filipino, of which he later became vice director and director.

== Political career ==
=== Representative (1909–1912, 1916–1919) ===
In a special election on January 19, 1909, Tirona was elected a member of the Philippine Assembly for Cavite after his predecessor Rafael Palma was appointed in 1908 to the Philippine Commission. He was re-elected to a full term in November of the same year. In 1910, he was elected a member of the executive committee of the Nacionalista Party. He served in the Assembly until October 16, 1912, when he lost reelection to Florentino Joya. He was elected to the House of Representatives in 1916 as representative of Cavite and served until 1919.

=== Senator (1922–1928) ===
In 1922, Tirona was elected for the Partido Democrata for the first time as a member of the Senate from the 4th District, which comprised Manila, Bataan, Laguna and Rizal. He won reelection in 1925 and served until 1928.

=== Representative (1931–1934) ===
In 1931, he was again elected to the House of Representatives representing Cavite and served until 1934. During this time, he joined the OsRox Mission that led negotiations for the independence of the Philippines with the US government, resulting in the Hare–Hawes–Cutting Act. In the first presidential election for the Commonwealth of the Philippines on September 16, 1935, he supported the candidacy of Emilio Aguinaldo, who lost to Manuel Quezon.

=== Senator (1945–1952) ===
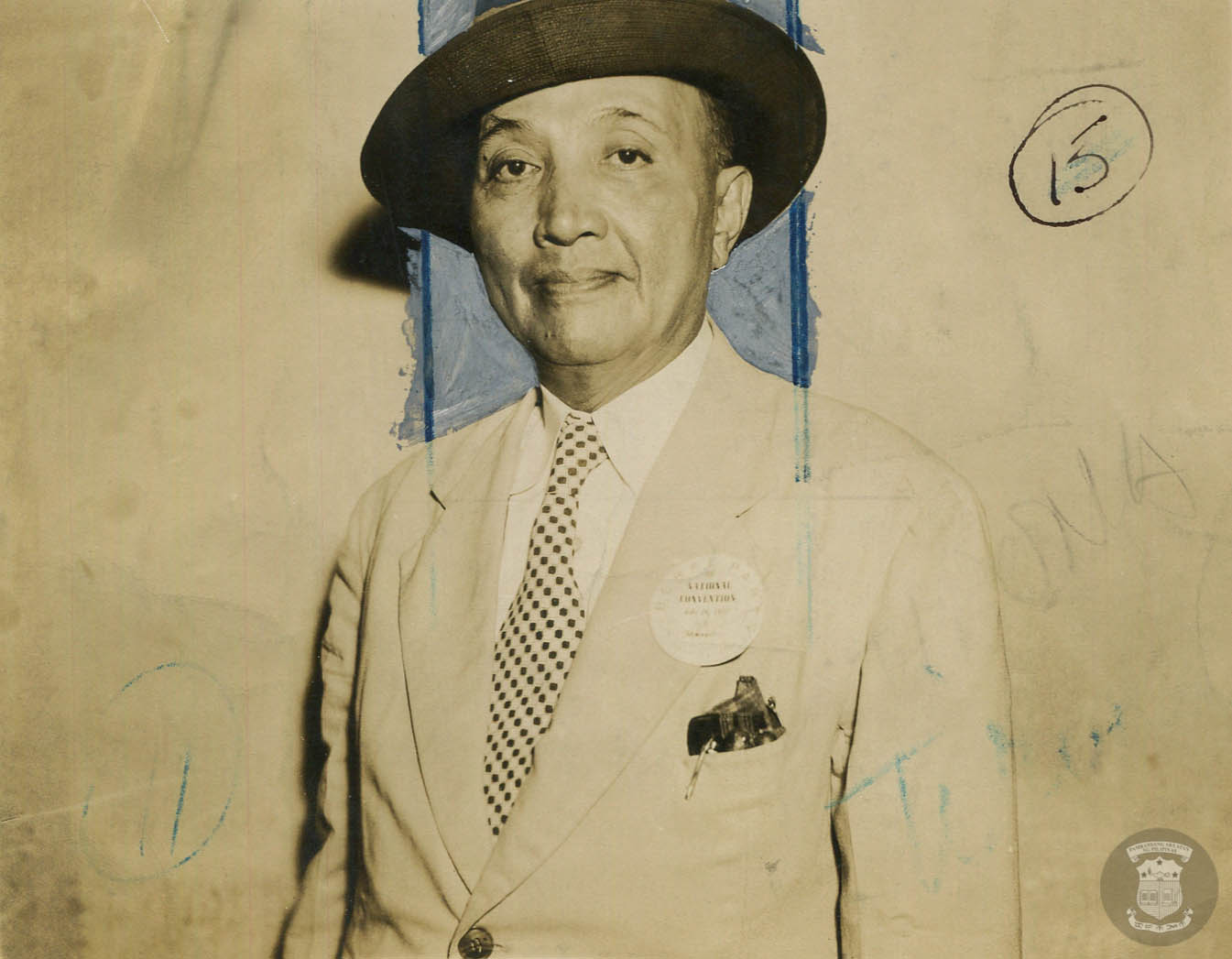
Tría Tirona during tenure as senator

Tirona was re-elected to the Senate for the Nacionalista Party in the November 11, 1941 elections. However, he was not able to take his oath of office on December 30, 1941, because of the Japanese invasion of the Philippines during the Second World War. During Liberation in 1945, Tirona fled with the Japanese to northern Luzon, but was subsequently arrested by the Counter Intelligence Corps due to collaborating with Japan during the occupation.

Following the restoration of the Commonwealth Congress, Tirona's term was extended by drawing lots until November 1947. In the elections that year, Tirona ran again for a seat in the Senate for the Liberal Party and won fourth place of the eight available seats with 1,552,545 votes. He then served from December 30, 1947, until his death in office on April 8, 1952 from lung cancer at the Chinese General Hospital in Manila.

== Legacy ==
A high school in Kawit is named after him.
