= 1934 Philippine House of Representatives elections =

6th Philippine House of Representatives elections

- June 5, 1934

All 92 seats in the House of Representatives of the Philippines 47 seats needed for a majority
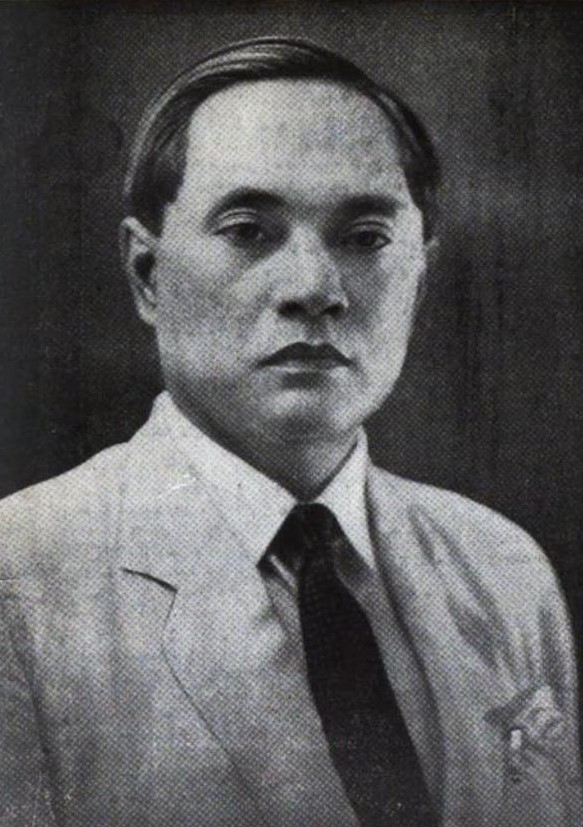

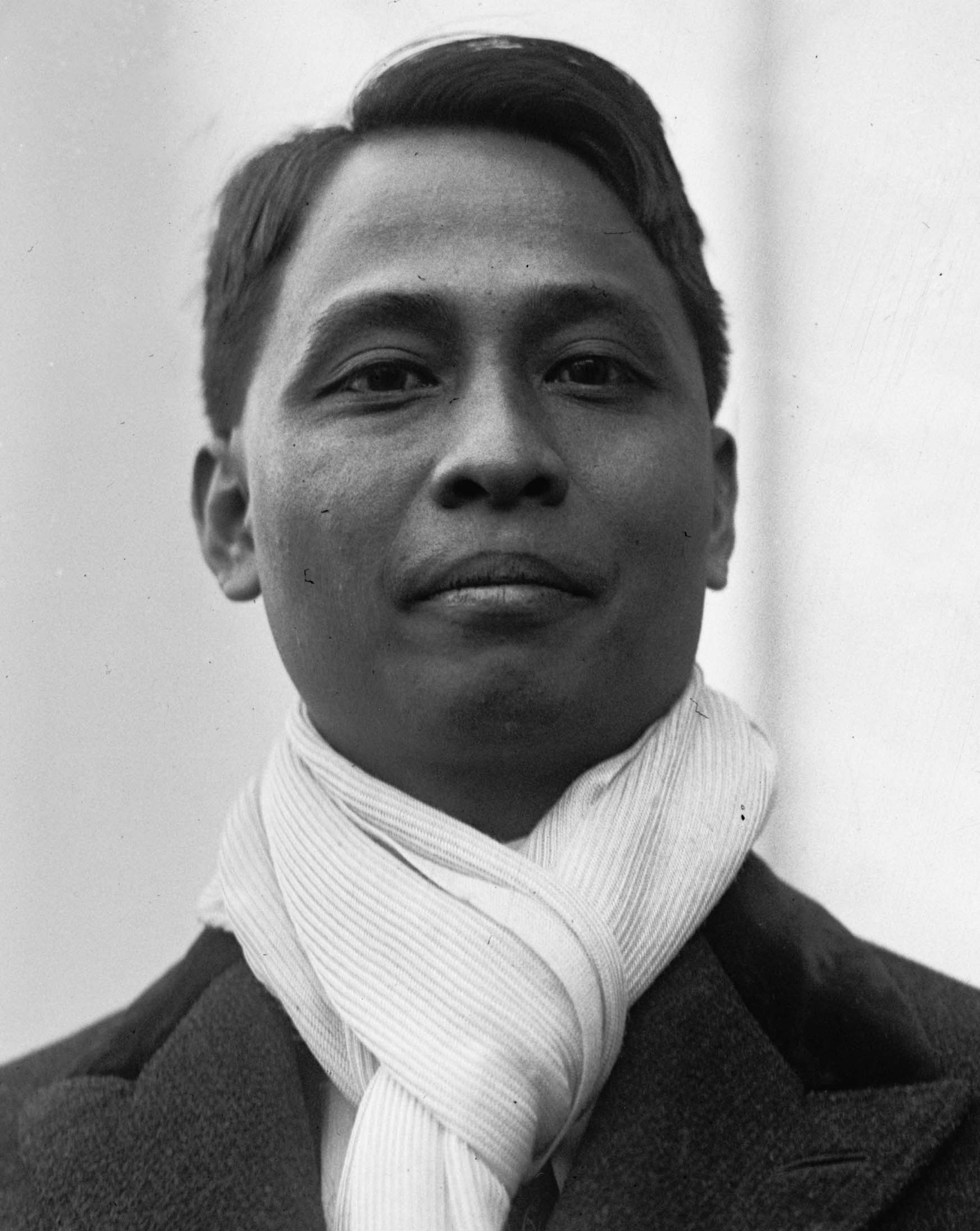
	Majority party	Minority party
Leader	Quintín Paredes	Manuel Roxas
Party	Nacionalista Democratico	Nacionalista Democrata Pro-Independencia
Leader's seat	Abra	Capiz–1st
Seats won	70	19
Seat change	▲2	▼49
Speaker before election
Manuel Roxas
Nacionalista
Consolidado
Elected Speaker
Quintín Paredes
Nacionalista
Democratico

Elections for the members of the House of Representatives were held on June 5, 1934 pursuant to the Philippine Organic Act of 1902, which prescribed elections for every three years. The ruling Nacionalista Consolidado was split anew into two factions: the Democrata Pro-Independencias who were in favor of the Hare–Hawes–Cutting Act (the "Pros"), and the Democraticos who were against it (the "Antis"). The "Antis" were led by then-Senate President Manuel L. Quezon while the "Pros" were led by then-Senator Sergio Osmeña. The "Antis" won in the House while the "Pros" won in the Senate. The elected representatives would serve in the 10th Philippine Legislature from 1934 to 1935.

== Results ==
↓

70	19	3
Democratico	Pro-Independencia	S.

Party	Seats	+/–
Nacionalista Democratico	70	New
Nacionalista Democrata Pro-Independencia	19	New
Sakdalista	3	New
Total	92	+6
