= Quintín Paredes =

President of the Senate of the Philippines in 1952

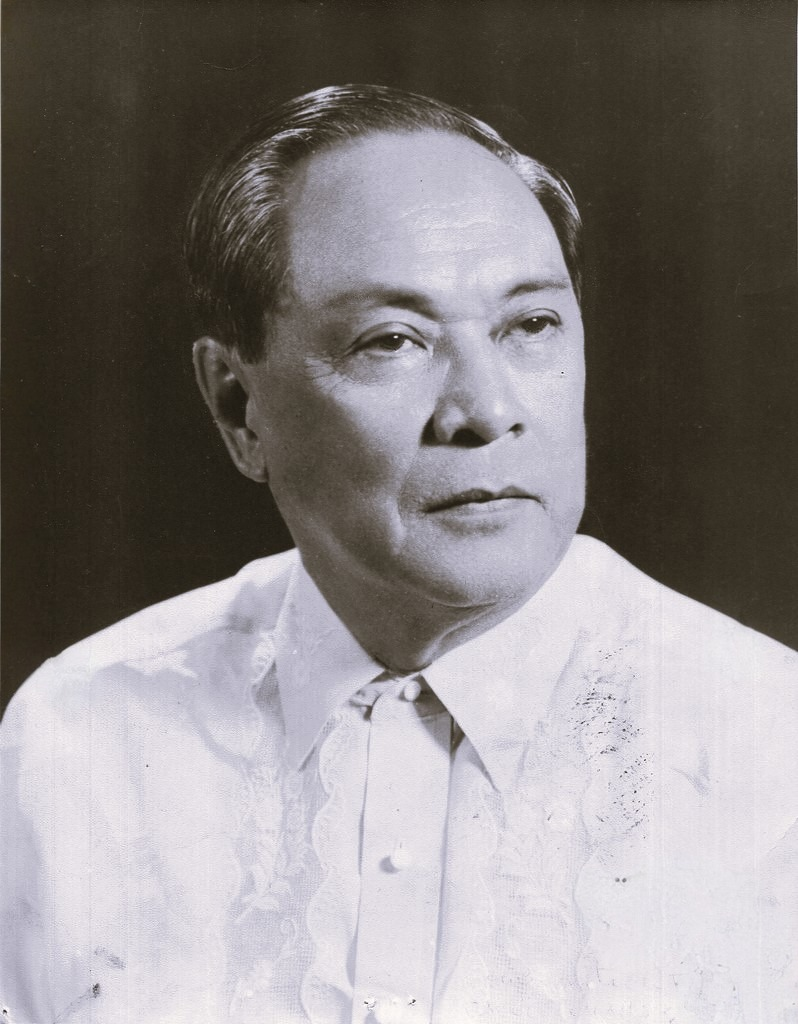

5th President of the Senate of the Philippines
- In office March 5, 1952 – April 17, 1952
- Preceded by: Mariano Jesús Cuenco
- Succeeded by: Camilo Osías

President pro tempore of the Senate of the Philippines
- In office January 31, 1950 – March 5, 1952
- Preceded by: Melecio Arranz
- Succeeded by: Manuel Briones

Senator of the Philippines
- In office December 30, 1949 – December 30, 1961
- In office 1941–1945

Majority Leader of the National Assembly
- In office January 24, 1939 – December 30, 1941
- Preceded by: José E. Romero
- Succeeded by: Francisco Zulueta

Resident Commissioner of the Philippines
- In office February 14, 1936 – September 29, 1938
- Preceded by: Pedro Guevara; Francisco Afan Delgado
- Succeeded by: Joaquín Miguel Elizalde

3rd Speaker of the Philippine House of Representatives
- In office August 23, 1933 – November 15, 1935
- Preceded by: Manuel Roxas
- Succeeded by: Gil Montilla

Member of the Philippines House of Representatives from Abra's at-large district Member of the National Assembly (1935–1941)
- In office 1925 – January 9, 1936
- Preceded by: Adolfo Brillantes
- Succeeded by: Agapito Garduque
- In office December 30, 1938 – December 30, 1941
- Preceded by: Agapito Garduque
- Succeeded by: Position abolished
- In office May 25, 1946 – December 30, 1949
- Preceded by: Jesús Paredes
- Succeeded by: Virgilio Valera

7th Secretary of Justice
- In office July 1, 1920 – December 15, 1921
- Appointed by: Francis Burton Harrison; Leonard Wood
- Preceded by: Victorino Mapa
- Succeeded by: José Abad Santos

Solicitor-General of the Philippines
- In office March 1, 1917 – June 30, 1918
- Preceded by: Rafael Corpus

Attorney General of the Philippines
- In office July 1, 1918 – June 30, 1920
- Preceded by: Ramon Avanceña
- Succeeded by: Felecisimo Feria

Personal details
- Born: Quintín Paredes y Babila; September 9, 1884 Bangued, Abra, Captaincy General of the Philippines
- Died: January 30, 1973 (aged 88) Manila, Philippines
- Resting place: Manila North Cemetery, Santa Cruz, Manila, Philippines
- Party: Liberal (1946–1973)
- Other political affiliations: Nacionalista (1925–1946)
- Spouses: Victoria Peralta; Gregoria Yujuico
- Children: 12, including Lourdes

Quintín Paredes y Babila (September 9, 1884 – January 30, 1973), was a Filipino lawyer, politician, and statesman.

As a member of the House of Representatives in the Philippine Commonwealth, he became Resident Commissioner of the Philippines to the United States House of Representatives from 1936. Due to increasing anti-Filipino sentiment in U.S. Congress and the denial of U.S. Senate for the credit line in order to stabilize the Philippine's economy, he resigned in 1938.

From 1941 to 1945, he was elected in the Philippine Senate where he was deemed a Japanese collaborator. After being acquitted from his arrest in 1948, he ran for the Philippine Legislature and once again elected senator from 1949 to 1961. Paredes held the record as the shortest-tenured senator in history whether in one continuous sitting or in an accumulated total of 43 days, until he was surpassed by Alan Peter Cayetano.

He was the father of Lourdes Paredes-San Diego, the first female presiding justice of the Philippine Court of Appeals.

== Early life and education ==
He was born in Bangued, Abra, Philippines on September 9, 1884 to Don Juan Félix Paredes y Pe Benito and Regine Babila, daughter of an Itneg tribal leader.

He obtained his elementary education at the school his father had established, and also studied at the Colegio Seminario de Vigan and at the Colegio de San Juan de Letran. He pursued law at the Escuela de Derecho de Manila. Graduating in 1907, Paredes took and passed the bar examinations the same year.

== Early career and government service ==
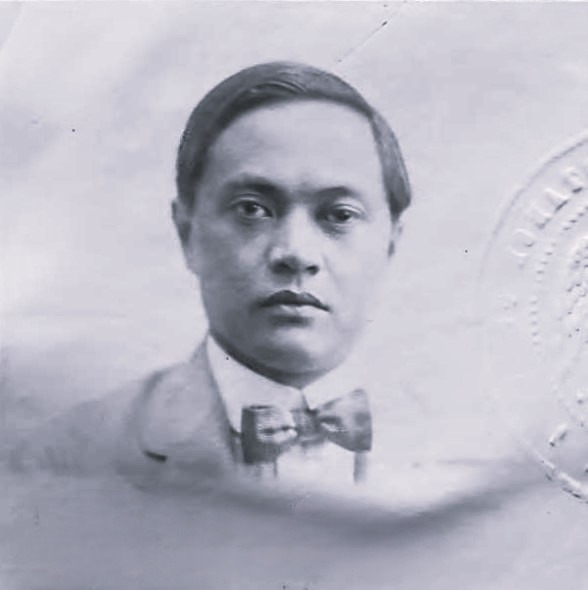
Paredes in 1918

After graduation, Paredes started his private practice in Manila.

He was appointed fourth prosecuting attorney on July 9, 1908, first prosecuting attorney on November 1, 1913, and served until March 1, 1917.

He served as Philippine Solicitor General from March 1, 1917 to 1918, as Attorney-General from 1918 to July 1, 1920, and as Secretary of Justice from 1920 to 1921. As Attorney-General, Paredes was a member of the first parliamentary mission to the United States in 1919. He resumed the practice of law in Manila in 1921.

== Political career ==
=== House of Representatives ===
He was elected to the Philippine House of Representatives to represent Abra's lone district in 1925, 1928, 1931, and 1934, serving as Speaker pro tempore of the House of Representatives from 1929 to 1931, and as the Speaker itself from 1934 to 1935. In 1935 he was elected as a member of the Philippine Assembly but he resigned to serve as the Philippines' Resident Commissioner.

==== As Resident Commissioner ====
Under the Tydings–McDuffie Act that created the Philippine Commonwealth Government, Paredes became its first Resident Commissioner, serving from February 14, 1936, until his resignation on September 29, 1938.

As Resident Commissioner, Paredes focused on two key objectives. First, he aimed to revise the Tydings-McDuffie Act, which he believed would harm the Philippines' economic structure. He hoped to secure changes that would allow the Philippines to adapt to the global economy. Second, he sought to protect a significant line of credit with the U.S. Treasury Department to safeguard the Philippines' financial stability.

The Philippine government had previously invested in U.S. banks, but due to a missed opportunity to convert to gold, they incurred significant losses. To compensate for these losses, the U.S. Congress authorized a $24 million credit line. However, there were attempts to repeal this credit line, and Paredes, as the Resident Commissioner, had to fight to protect it. Despite his limited time in Washington, he presented his case to the Senate Banking and Currency Committee in March 1936. Unfortunately for Paredes, the U.S. Senate committee chose to repeal the measure and stated that the credit line was "misunderstood" by Congress.

During Paredes's time in the House, isolationist sentiments in U.S. Congress grew, with many American lawmakers wanting the U.S. to withdraw from the Pacific. This shift in public opinion, influenced by certain industries, made it harder for Paredes to advocate for the Philippines' interests. He faced accusations of ingratitude and faced growing prejudice against the Philippines. Feeling defeated, he resigned as Resident Commissioner.

Upon his resignation in September 1938, Manuel Quezon, despite their rivalry in politics, complemented Paredes saying:

There is no gainsaying the fact that you are entitled to a great amount of the credit for assisting in the passage of many pieces of legislation favorable to the Philippines and vigorously fighting unjust and adverse bills which embodied threats of harm to us economically as well as politically...

— Manuel L. Quezon

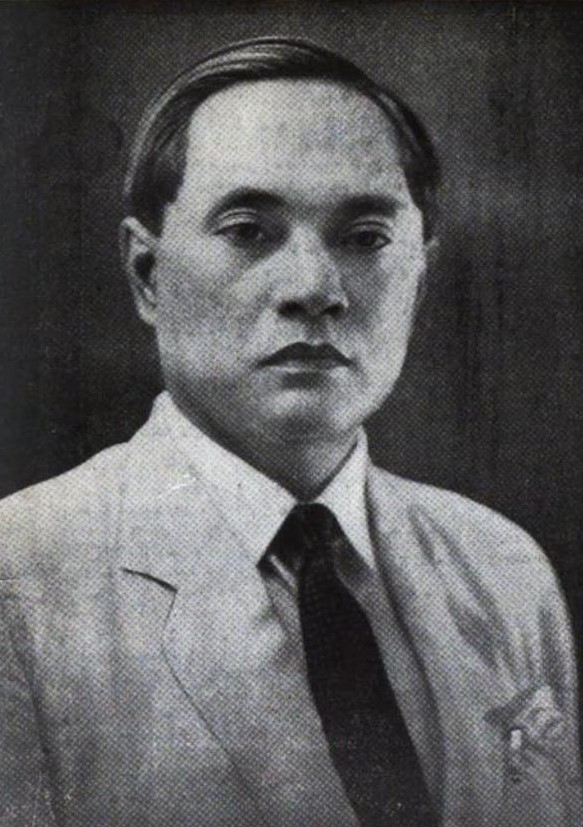
Photograph from The Commercial & Industrial Manual of the Philippines, 1941

In 1938, he was again elected a member of the Philippine Assembly, and served as the Majority Floor Leader during this term.

=== Philippine Senate (1941–1945) ===
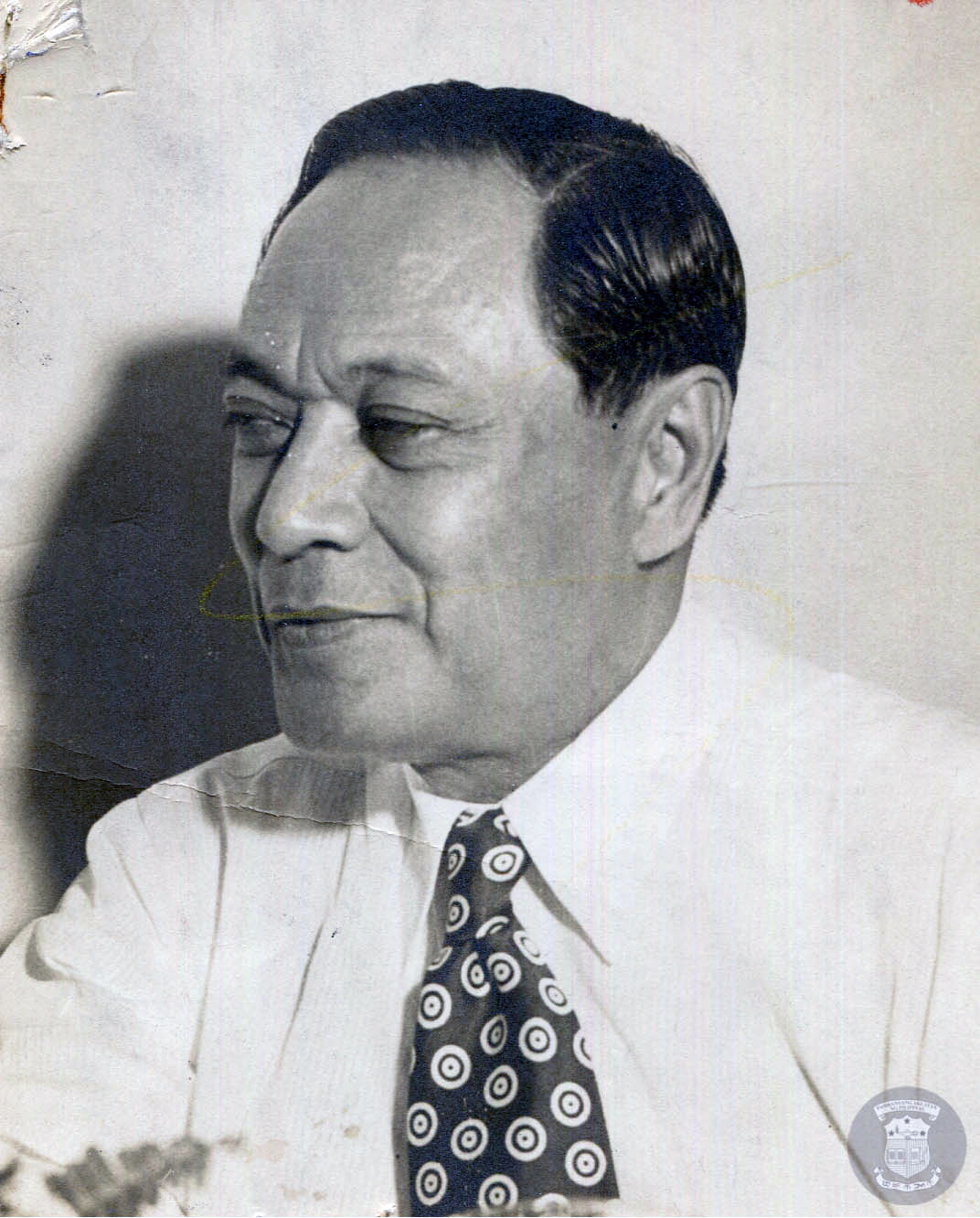
A portrait of Paredes

He was also elected as a member of the Philippine Senate from 1941 to 1945 that did not sit in session due to the onset of World War II and the Japanese Occupation of the Philippines. As a senator under the administration of President Jose P. Laurel, he became commissioner of public works and was chosen as secretary of justice once again.

Under Japanese control, the Philippine government recognized that inadequate irrigation was a major obstacle to agricultural development. To address this, they initiated the Agno River Control Project. Paredes, being the commissioner of public works, made use of the manpower available to the state in order to build dikes along the Agno River. The built dikes were utilized to prevent flooding and harnessing the river's water to irrigate fertile lands in several provinces, including Pangasinan, La Union, Ilocos Norte, Pampanga, and Nueva Ecija.

The U.S. Military arrested Paredes with charges up to 21 counts of treason as a Japanese collaborator. He was acquitted in 1948 by Filipino courts.

After the Second World War, Paredes ran again for his old post representing Abra in the Philippine House of Representatives, and won. He held this post from 1946 to 1949. Despite him being a Japanese collaborator, he was elected to the Philippine Legislature throughout the 1950s.

=== Philippine Senate (1949 – 1961) ===
The old Philippine Senate, 1951: Senator Paredes at extreme right, debates Senator Cipriano P. Primicias, Sr. at extreme left. In the middle are Senators Justiniano Montano, Mariano Jesús Cuenco, Enrique B. Magalona, and Francisco Afan Delgado. In the foreground is Senator Edmundo Cea.

In the Philippine elections of 1949, Paredes topped the Senatorial race as a candidate of the Liberal Party. He briefly became the President of the Philippine Senate in 1952, and was reelected as a Philippine Senator in 1955, finishing his second term in 1961. Retiring from politics in 1963, Paredes died ten years later in Manila.

== Other posts held ==
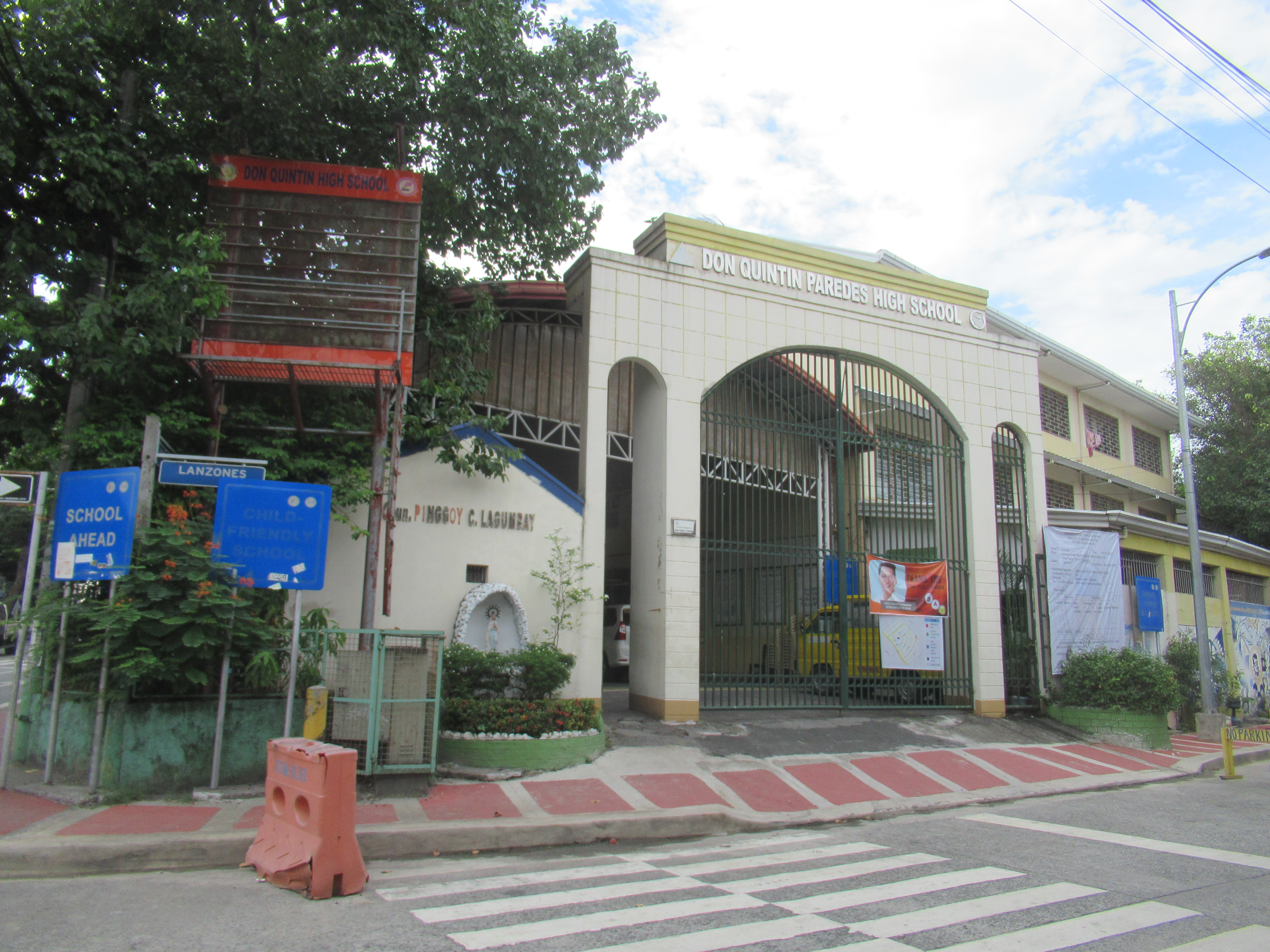
Don Quintin Paredes High School

- Dean of the law school (Escuela de Derecho) of Manila, 1913 to 1917
- President of the General Bank & Trust Co., 1963 to 1969

== See also ==
- List of Asian Americans and Pacific Islands Americans in the United States Congress
- Resident Commissioner of the Philippines

Political offices
Preceded by Victorino Mapa	Secretary of Justice; 1920–1921	Succeeded by José Abad Santos
Preceded by Manuel Roxas	Speaker of the House of Representatives; 1934–1935	Succeeded by Gil Montilla
Preceded by Mariano Jesús Cuenco	President of the Senate of the Philippines; 1952	Succeeded by Camilo Osías
U.S. House of Representatives
Preceded by Francisco Afan Delgado	Resident Commissioner from the Philippines to the United States Congress; 1936–1938	Succeeded by Joaquín Miguel Elizalde
House of Representatives of the Philippines
Preceded by Adolfo Brillantes	Representative, Abra's at-large district 1925–1935	Succeeded by Agapito Garduque
Preceded by Agapito Garduque	Assemblyman, Abra's at-large district 1938–1941	District abolished
Preceded by José E. Romero	Majority Floor Leader of the National Assembly of the Commonwealth of the Philippines; 1939–1941	Succeeded by Francisco Zulueta
Preceded by Jesús Paredes	Representative, Abra's at-large district 1946–1949	Succeeded by Virgilio Valera
