= 1925 Philippine Senate elections =

4th Philippine senatorial election

- June 2, 1925

11 of 24 seats in the Philippine Senate
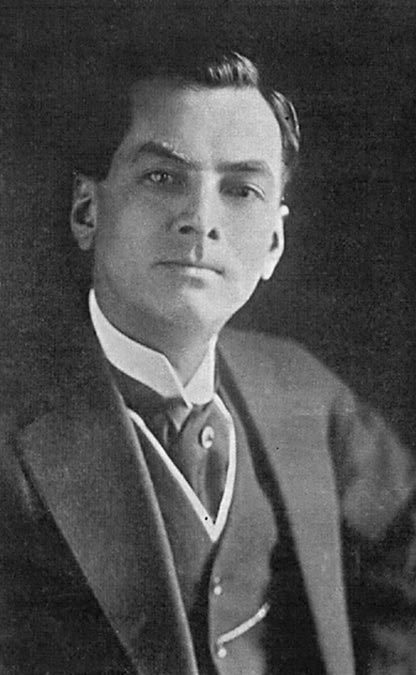

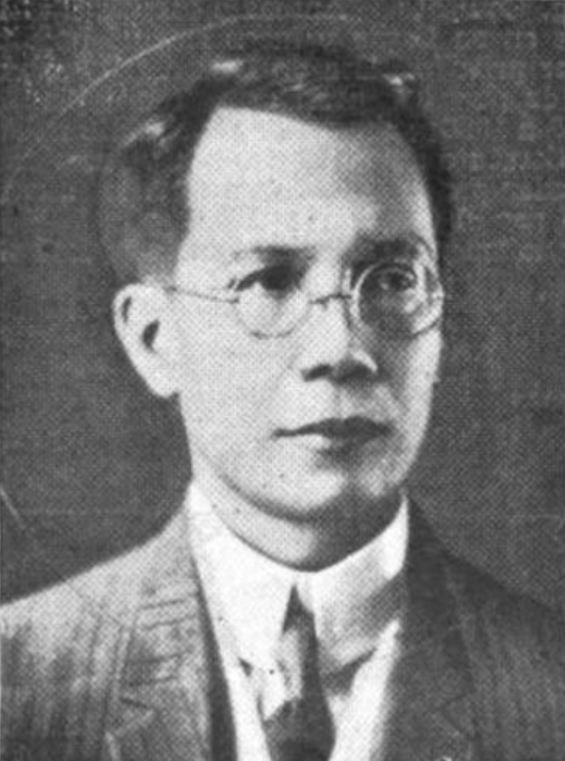
	Majority party	Minority party
Leader	Manuel L. Quezon	Juan Sumulong
Party	Nacionalista	Democrata
Leader's seat	5th District	4th District
Seats before	16	7
Seats won	7	4
Seats after	13	10
Seat change	▼3	▲3
- Election results; each district sent in two seats to the Senate. 2 Nacionalistas 2 Democratas 1 Nacionalista and 1 Democrata
Senate President before election
Manuel L. Quezon
Nacionalista
Elected Senate President
Manuel L. Quezon
Nacionalista

Senatorial elections happened on June 2, 1925 in the Philippines under the Jones Law provisions.

== Electoral system ==
In a staggered election, the seats of the senators who were first disputed in 1919 were up for election. The Philippines is divided into 12 senatorial districts, of which all districts save for the 12th district, has one of its seats up. In the 12th district, any vacancy is filled via appointment of the Governor-General. The election itself is via first-past-the-post.

== Results ==
↓

13	1	10
Nacionalista	V	Democrata

=== Philippines's 1st senatorial district ===
Candidate	Party	Votes	%
Elpidio Quirino	Partido Nacionalista Consolidado	23,213	68.28
Irineo Javier	Partido Democrata Nacional	10,784	31.72
Total		33,997	100.00

=== Philippines's 2nd senatorial district ===
Candidate	Party	Votes	%
Camilo Osias	Partido Nacionalista Consolidado	20,008	54.88
Alejandro de Guzmán	Liga Popular Nacionalista	16,447	45.12
Total		36,455	100.00

=== Philippines's 3rd senatorial district ===
Candidate	Party	Votes	%
Teodoro Sandiko	Partido Democrata Nacional	64,587	57.23
Felipe Buencamino Jr.	Partido Nacionalista Consolidado	48,265	42.77
Total		112,852	100.00

=== Philippines's 4th senatorial district ===
Candidate	Party	Votes	%
Juan Sumulong	Partido Democrata Nacional	53,448	53.26
Ramon J. Fernandez	Partido Nacionalista Consolidado	46,913	46.74
Total		100,361	100.00

=== Philippines's 5th senatorial district ===
Candidate	Party	Votes	%
Jose P. Laurel	Partido Nacionalista Consolidado	28,641	59.42
Antero Soriano	Partido Democrata Nacional	19,559	40.58
Total		48,200	100.00

=== Philippines's 6th senatorial district ===
Candidate	Party	Votes	%
Jose O. Vera	Partido Nacionalista Consolidado	26,113	59.94
Julian Ocampo	Partido Democrata Nacional	17,449	40.06
Total		43,562	100.00

=== Philippines's 7th senatorial district ===
Candidate	Party	Votes	%
Jose Maria Arroyo	Partido Nacionalista Consolidado	19,334	63.72
Ruperto Montinola	Partido Democrata Nacional	11,008	36.28
Total		30,342	100.00

=== Philippines's 8th senatorial district ===
Candidate	Party	Votes	%
Hermenegildo Villanueva	Partido Nacionalista Consolidado	25,447	67.86
Angel Salazar	Partido Democrata Nacional	12,054	32.14
Total		37,501	100.00

=== Philippines's 9th senatorial district ===
Candidate	Party	Votes	%
Jose Maria Veloso	Partido Democrata Nacional	9,664	57.71
Esteban Singson	Partido Nacionalista Consolidado	7,083	42.29
Total		16,747	100.00

=== Philippines's 10th senatorial district ===
Candidate	Party	Votes	%
Pedro Rodriguez	Partido Nacionalista Consolidado	33,552	58.18
Vicente Sotto	Partido Democrata Nacional	24,119	41.82
Total		57,671	100.00

=== Philippines's 11th senatorial district ===
Candidate	Party	Votes	%
Troadio Galicano	Partido Democrata Nacional	10,225	54.04
Francisco Soriano	Partido Nacionalista Consolidado	8,695	45.96
Total		18,920	100.00

=== Philippines's 12th senatorial district* ===
Candidate	Party
Jose Alejandrino	Partido Democrata Nacional
Hadji Butu	Partido Democrata Nacional
Total

- Non-elective positions. Appointed by the American Governor-General

=== August 31, 1925 Special Election for Philippines's 8th senatorial district ===
To serve the unexpired term of Senator Espiridion Guanco, who died in office on May 2, 1925. The winner will serve until 1928.

Candidate	Party	Votes	%
Mariano Yulo	Partido Nacionalista	23,416	54.53
Angel Salazar	Partido Democrata Nacional	19,523	45.47
Total		42,939	100.00

=== March 23, 1926 Special Election for Philippines's 3rd senatorial district ===
To serve the unexpired term of Senator Santiago Lucero, who died in office on November 2, 1925. The winner will serve until 1928.

Candidate	Party	Votes	%
Luis Morales	Partido Democrata Nacional	48,559	52.92
Felipe Buencamino Jr.	Partido Nacionalista	43,201	47.08
Total		91,760	100.00

=== December 30, 1926 Special Election for Philippines's 9th senatorial district ===
To serve the unexpired term of Senator Tomas Gomez, who died in office on July 28, 1926. The winner will serve until 1928.

Candidate	Party	Votes	%
Pastor Salazar	Partido Nacionalista	10,005	57.59
Pastor Navarro	Partido Democrata Nacional	7,368	42.41
Total		17,373	100.00

=== July 21, 1927 Special Election for Philippines's 7th senatorial district ===
To serve the unexpired term of Senator Jose Maria Arroyo, who died in office in 1927. The winner will serve until 1931.

Candidate	Party	Votes	%
Jose Ledesma	Partido Nacionalista	17,254	53.33
Ruperto Montinola	Partido Democrata Nacional	15,102	46.67
Total		32,356	100.00

Party	Seats				
Party	Up	Before	Won	After	+/−
Nacionalista (Note: In the 1922 election, the Nacionalista Party was divided into the Colectivistas, which had 12 seats, and the Unipersonalistas, which had 6 seats. The two factions reconciled prior to this election.)	10	16	7	13	−3
Democrata	1	5	4	8	+3
Appointed (Note: The two appointed senators were from Democrata.)	0	2	0	2	0
Vacant	0	1	0	1	0
Total	11	24	11	24	0

== See also ==
- 7th Philippine Legislature
- Commission on Elections
- Politics of the Philippines
- Philippine elections
