= 7th Philippine Legislature =

9th legislative term of the Philippines

←	6th	8th	→
- Old Legislative Building (c. 1988)

Overview
- Term: July 16, 1925 – November 9, 1927
- Governor-General: Leonard Wood (until August 7, 1927); Eugene Allen Gilmore (acting, August 7 – December 27, 1927); Henry L. Stimson (from December 27, 1927)

Senate
- Members: 24
- President: Manuel L. Quezon
- President pro tempore: Sergio Osmeña
- Majority leader: Jose P. Laurel

House of Representatives
- Members: 92
- Speaker: Manuel Roxas
- Speaker pro tempore: Antonio de las Alas
- Majority leader: Benigno Aquino Sr.

The 7th Philippine Legislature was the meeting of the legislature of the Philippines under the sovereign control of the United States from 1925 to 1928.

== Sessions ==
- First Regular Session: July 16 – November 9, 1925
- Second Regular Session: July 16 – November 9, 1926
- Third Regular Session: July 16 – November 9, 1927

== Party summary ==
=== Senate ===
Composition of the Senate during the 7th Legislature.

	Party (shading shows control)			Total	Vacant
	Nacionalista	Democrata	Independent	Total	Vacant
End of previous legislature	16	7	1	24	0
Begin	14	10	0	24	0
End	14	10	0	24	0
Final voting share	58.3%	41.7%	—N/a		
Beginning of next legislature	16	8	0	24	0

=== House of Representatives ===
Composition of the House of Representatives during the 7th Legislature.

	Party (shading shows control)			Total	Vacant
	Nacionalista	Democrata	Independent	Total	Vacant
End of previous legislature	58	29	6	93	0
Begin	64	21	7	92	0
End	64	21	7	92	0
Final voting share	69.6%	22.8%	7.6%		
Beginning of next legislature	74	12	8	94	0

== Leadership ==
=== Senate ===
Senate President

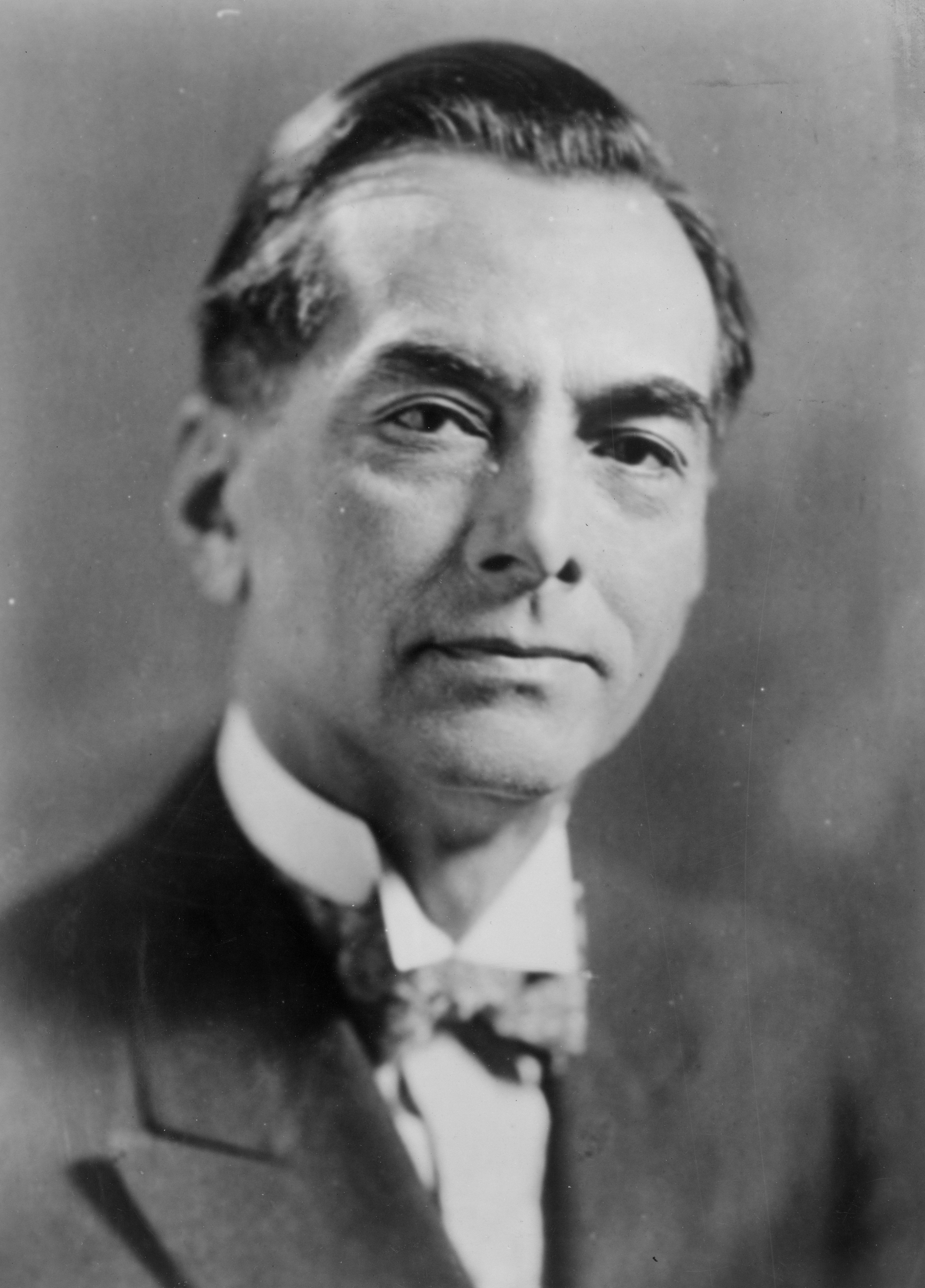
Manuel L. Quezon

- President: Manuel L. Quezon (5th District, Nacionalista)
- President pro tempore: Sergio Osmeña (10th District, Nacionalista)
- Majority Floor Leader: Jose P. Laurel (5th District, Nacionalista)

=== House of Representatives ===
House Speaker

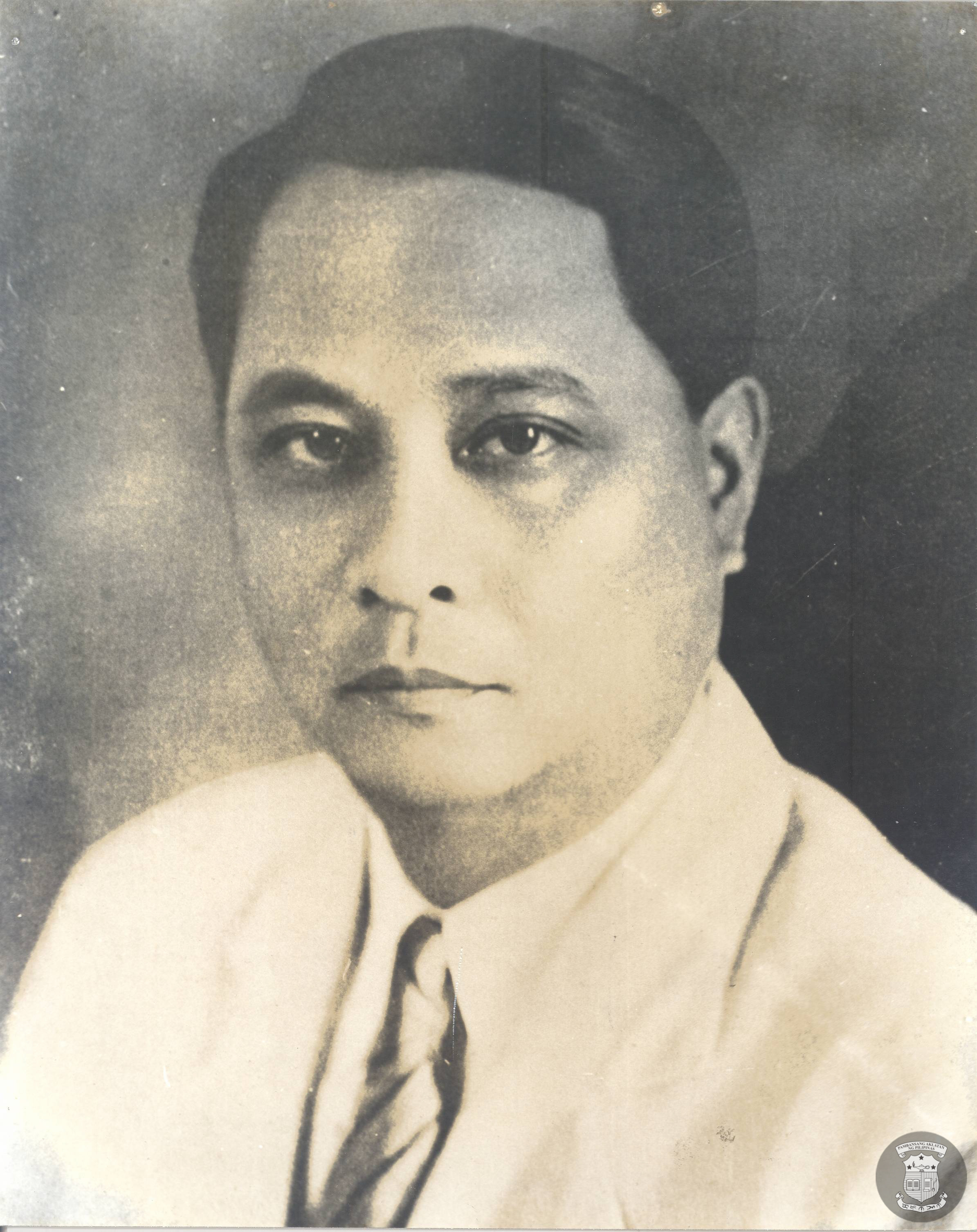
Manuel Roxas

- Speaker: Manuel Roxas (Capiz–1st, Nacionalista)
- Speaker pro tempore: Antonio de las Alas (Batangas–1st, Nacionalista)
- Majority Floor Leader: Benigno Aquino Sr. (Tarlac–2nd, Nacionalista)

== Members ==
=== Senate ===
The following are the terms of the elected senators of this Legislature, according to the date of election:

- For senators elected on June 6, 1922: June 6, 1922 – June 5, 1928
- For senators elected on June 2, 1925: June 2, 1925 – June 2, 1931

Senators of the 12th District were appointed for indefinite terms.

District	Term end	Senator	Party
1st District	1928	Isabelo de los Reyes	Nacionalista
1st District	1931	Elpidio Quirino	Nacionalista
2nd District	1928	Alejo Mabanag	Democrata
2nd District	1931	Camilo Osias	Nacionalista
3rd District	1928	Santiago Lucero (Note: Santiago Lucero died on November 2, 1925.)	Democrata
3rd District	1928	Luis Morales (Note: Luis Morales was elected on March 23, 1926, to succeed Santiago Lucero.)	Democrata
3rd District	1931	Teodoro Sandiko	Democrata
4th District	1928	Emiliano Tria Tirona	Democrata
4th District	1931	Juan Sumulong	Democrata
5th District	1928	Manuel L. Quezon	Nacionalista
5th District	1931	Jose P. Laurel	Nacionalista
6th District	1928	Juan B. Alegre	Nacionalista
6th District	1931	Jose O. Vera	Nacionalista
7th District	1928	Jose Hontiveros	Democrata
7th District	1931	Jose Ledesma	Nacionalista
8th District	1928	Mariano Yulo (Note: Mariano Yulo was elected on August 31, 1925, to replace Espiridion Guanco, who died on May 2, 1925.)	Nacionalista
8th District	1931	Hermenegildo Villanueva	Nacionalista
9th District	1928	Tomas Gomez (Note: Tomas Gomez died on July 28, 1926.)	Nacionalista
9th District	1928	Pastor Salazar (Note: Pastor Salazar was elected on December 30, 1926, to succeed Tomas Gomez.)	Nacionalista
9th District	1931	Jose Maria Veloso	Democrata
10th District	1928	Sergio Osmeña	Nacionalista
10th District	1931	Pedro Rodriguez	Nacionalista
11th District	1928	Jose Clarin	Nacionalista
11th District	1931	Troadio Galicano	Democrata
12th District	—	Jose Alejandrino (Note: Appointed.)	Democrata
12th District	—	Hadji Butu	Democrata

=== House of Representatives ===
Province/City	District	Representative	Party
Abra	Lone	Quintin Paredes	Nacionalista
Albay	1st	Francisco Peňa	Nacionalista
Albay	2nd	Francisco Perfecto	Nacionalista
Albay	3rd	Pedro Sabido	Nacionalista
Antique	Lone	Segundo Moscoso	Nacionalista
Bataan	Lone	Manuel Banzon	Democrata
Batanes	Lone	Vicente Agan	Nacionalista
Batangas	1st	Antonio de las Alas	Nacionalista
Batangas	2nd	Andres Buendia	Nacionalista
Batangas	3rd	Claro M. Recto	Democrata
Bohol	1st	Fermin Torralba	Nacionalista
Bohol	2nd	Olegario Clarin	Nacionalista
Bohol	3rd	Carlos P. Garcia	Nacionalista
Bulacan	1st	Jose Padilla Sr.	Democrata
Bulacan	2nd	Jose Serapio	Democrata
Cagayan	1st	Vicente Formoso	Nacionalista
Cagayan	2nd	Antonio Guzman	Democrata
Camarines Norte	Lone	Rafael Carranceja	Nacionalista
Camarines Sur	1st	Ramon B. Felipe	Democrata
Camarines Sur	2nd	Manuel Fuentebella	Nacionalista
Capiz	1st	Manuel Roxas	Nacionalista
Capiz	2nd	Jose Altavas	Nacionalista
Capiz	3rd	Manuel Laserna	Nacionalista
Cavite	Lone	Augusto A. Reyes (Note: Augusto A. Reyes died on July 3, 1925.)	Nacionalista
Cavite	Lone	Antero Soriano (Note: Antero Soriano was elected on August 15, 1925, to succeed Augusto A. Reyes.)	Nacionalista
Cebu	1st	Manuel Briones	Nacionalista
Cebu	2nd	Paulino Gullas	Nacionalista
Cebu	3rd	Vicente Rama	Democrata
Cebu	4th	Juan Alcazaren	Nacionalista
Cebu	5th	Mariano Jesus Cuenco	Nacionalista
Cebu	6th	Pastor Noel	Nacionalista
Cebu	7th	Paulino Ybañez	Nacionalista
Ilocos Norte	1st	Severo Hernando	Nacionalista
Ilocos Norte	2nd	Mariano Marcos	Nacionalista
Ilocos Sur	1st	Simeon Ramos	Democrata
Ilocos Sur	2nd	Lupo Biteng	Nacionalista
Iloilo	1st	Eugenio Baldana	Democrata
Iloilo	2nd	Vicente Ybiernas	Nacionalista
Iloilo	3rd	Tomas Confesor	Nacionalista
Iloilo	4th	Asencion Arrancillo	Nacionalista
Iloilo	5th	Venancio Cudillo	Nacionalista
Isabela	Lone	Manuel Nieto	Nacionalista
La Union	1st	Fausto Almeida	Democrata
La Union	2nd	Leoncio Dacanay	Nacionalista
Laguna	1st	Tomas Dizon	Nacionalista
Laguna	2nd	Ananias Laico	Nacionalista
Leyte	1st	Juan Veloso	Nacionalista
Leyte	2nd	Tomas Oppus	Nacionalista
Leyte	3rd	Ruperto Kapunan	Nacionalista
Leyte	4th	Filomeno Montejo	Nacionalista
Manila	1st	Gregorio Perfecto	Democrata
Manila	2nd	Alfonso E. Mendoza	Democrata
Marinduque	Lone	Ricardo Nepomuceno	Nacionalista
Masbate	Lone	Eduardo Marcaida	Nacionalista
Mindanao and Sulu	Lone	Pedro de la Llana	Independent
Mindanao and Sulu	Lone	Jose Melencio	Independent
Mindanao and Sulu	Lone	Abdullah Piang	Independent
Mindanao and Sulu	Lone	Arsenio Suazo	Independent
Mindoro	Lone	Mariano Leuterio	Nacionalista
Misamis	1st	Segundo Gaston	Democrata
Misamis	2nd	Teogenes Velez	Democrata
Mountain Province	Lone	Joaquin Codamon	Independent
Mountain Province	Lone	Miguel Cornejo (Note: Miguel Cornejo was an appointed representative who was removed from office on October 6, 1925, after being convicted and sentenced to imprisonment for assaulting an American.)	Independent
Mountain Province	Lone	Henry A. Kamora	Independent
Mountain Province	Lone	Juan Cailles (Note: Juan Cailles was appointed in October 1925, to succeed Miguel Cornejo.)	Democrata
Negros Occidental	1st	Serafin P. Hilado	Nacionalista
Negros Occidental	2nd	Ramon Torres	Nacionalista
Negros Occidental	3rd	Isaac Lacson	Nacionalista
Negros Oriental	1st	Guillermo Z. Villanueva	Nacionalista
Negros Oriental	2nd	Enrique Villanueva	Nacionalista
Nueva Ecija	Lone	Isauro Gabaldon (Note: Representative-elect Isauro Gabaldon was disqualified.)	Nacionalista
Nueva Ecija	Lone	Feliciano Ramoso (Note: Feliciano Ramoso was elected on March 22, 1926, to succeed Isauro Gabaldon.)	Nacionalista
Nueva Vizcaya	Lone	Antonio Escamilla	Independent
Palawan	Lone	Patricio Fernandez	Nacionalista
Pampanga	1st	Pedro Valdez Liongson	Nacionalista
Pampanga	2nd	Ceferino Hilario	Nacionalista
Pangasinan	1st	Enrique Braganza	Nacionalista
Pangasinan	2nd	Isidoro Siapno	Nacionalista
Pangasinan	3rd	Servillano dela Cruz	Nacionalista
Pangasinan	4th	Eusebio V. Sison	Nacionalista
Pangasinan	5th	Evaristo Sanchez	Nacionalista
Rizal	1st	Basilio Bautista	Democrata
Rizal	2nd	Eulogio Rodriguez	Democrata
Romblon	Lone	Leonardo Festin	Nacionalista
Samar	1st	Jose Avelino	Democrata
Samar	2nd	Pascual B. Azanza	Democrata
Samar	3rd	Gerardo Morrero	Nacionalista
Sorsogon	1st	Juan Reyes	Democrata
Sorsogon	2nd	Mario Guariña	Nacionalista
Surigao	Lone	Montano Ortiz	Democrata
Tarlac	1st	Sisenardo Palarca	Nacionalista
Tarlac	2nd	Benigno Aquino Sr.	Nacionalista
Tayabas	1st	Primitivo San Agustin	Nacionalista
Tayabas	2nd	Leon Guinto	Nacionalista
Zambales	Lone	Alejo Labrador	Nacionalista

== Changes in membership ==
=== Senate ===
District	Incumbent				Special election	Successor		
District	Senator	Party	Date	Reason	Special election	Senator	Party	Date
3rd District	Santiago Lucero	Democrata	November 2, 1925	Died in office	March 23, 1926	Luis Morales	Democrata	March 23, 1926
9th District	Tomas Gomez	Nacionalista	July 28, 1926	Died in office	December 30, 1926	Pastor Salazar	Nacionalista	December 30, 1926

=== House of Representatives ===
District	Incumbent				Special election	Successor		
District	Member	Party	Date	Reason	Special election	Member	Party	Date
Cavite–Lone	Augusto A. Reyes	Nacionalista	July 3, 1925	Died in office	August 15, 1925	Antero Soriano	Nacionalista	August 15, 1925
Mountain Province–Lone	Miguel Cornejo	Independent	October 6, 1925	Removed from office	—N/a	Juan Cailles	Democrata	October 1925
Nueva Ecija–Lone	Isauro Gabaldon	Nacionalista	—N/a	Disqualified	March 22, 1926	Feliciano Ramoso	Nacionalista	March 22, 1926

== See also ==
- 1925 Philippine legislative election
  - 1925 Philippine Senate elections
  - 1925 Philippine House of Representatives elections
