= Benigno Aquino Sr. =

Filipino politician (1894–1947)

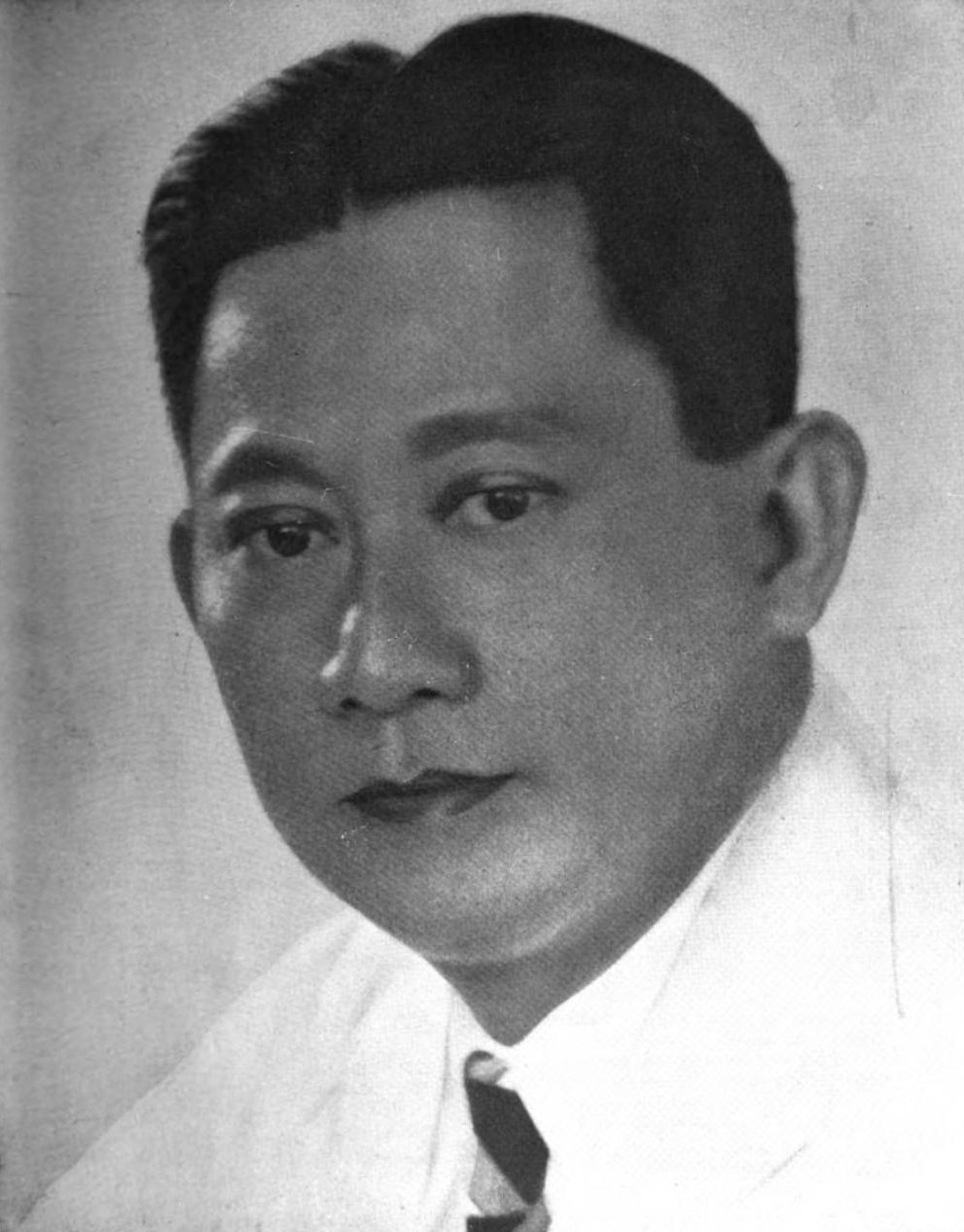
- Aquino Sr. in 1941

6th Speaker of the House of Representatives of the Philippines 1st Speaker of the National Assembly of the Second Philippine Republic
- In office September 25, 1943 – February 2, 1944
- Preceded by: José Yulo
- Succeeded by: Jose Zulueta

Member of the National Assembly of the Second Philippine Republic from Tarlac's at-large district
- In office September 25, 1943 – February 2, 1944 Serving with Sergio Aquino

Commissioner of the Interior
- In office 1942–1942
- Presiding Officer, PEC: Jorge B. Vargas
- Succeeded by: José P. Laurel

Secretary of Agriculture and Commerce
- In office 1938–1940
- President: Manuel L. Quezon
- Preceded by: Eulogio Rodriguez
- Succeeded by: Rafael Alunan Sr.

Member of the House of Representatives of the Commonwealth of the Philippines from Tarlac's 2nd district
- In office June 11, 1945 – May 25, 1946
- Preceded by: Jose Urquico as Member of the National Assembly
- Succeeded by: Alejandro Simpaoco

Member of the National Assembly of the Philippines from Tarlac's 2nd district
- In office September 16, 1935 – December 30, 1938
- Preceded by: Feliciano B. Gardiner as Representative
- Succeeded by: Jose Urquico

Senate Majority Leader
- In office July 16, 1931 – June 5, 1934
- Senate President: Manuel L. Quezon
- Preceded by: José P. Laurel
- Succeeded by: Claro M. Recto

Senator of the Philippines from the 3rd Senatorial District
- In office June 5, 1928 – June 5, 1934; Served with: Teodoro Sandiko (1928–1931); Sotero Baluyut (1931–1934)
- Preceded by: Luis Morales
- Succeeded by: Hermogenes Concepcion

Member of the Philippine House of Representatives from Tarlac's 2nd district
- In office June 3, 1919 – June 5, 1928
- Preceded by: Cayetano Rivera
- Succeeded by: Jose G. Domingo

Vice President of the Philippines
- De facto
- In office January 15, 1944 – August 17, 1945
- President: José P. Laurel

Personal details
- Born: Benigno Simeón Aquino y Quiambao; September 3, 1894 Murcia, Tarlac, Tarlac, Captaincy General of the Philippines, Spanish East Indies (now Concepcion, Tarlac, Philippines)
- Died: December 20, 1947 (aged 53) Manila, Philippines
- Party: Nacionalista (1919–1942; 1945–1947)
- Other political affiliations: KALIBAPI (1942–1945)
- Spouses: Maria Urquico (m. 1916; died 1928) Aurora Aquino (m. 1930)
- Children: 11 (incl. Ninoy, Butz and Tessie)
- Parents: Servillano Aquino (father); Guadalupe Quiambao (mother)
- Relatives: Aquino family
- Education: University of Santo Tomas (LL.B)
- Occupation: Farmer, politician
- Profession: Lawyer, civil servant

Benigno Simeón Aquino y Quiambao (September 3, 1894 – December 20, 1947) was a Filipino politician who served as speaker of the National Assembly of the Japanese-sponsored puppet state in the Philippines from 1943 to 1944. He was the Director-General of KALIBAPI, a political party established during the Japanese occupation of the Philippines.

A member of the Aquino family, one of his grandchildren (through Benigno "Ninoy" Jr.), Benigno S. Aquino III was the 15th President of the Philippines, serving from 2010 to 2016.

== Early life ==
Aquino was born in Murcia (now part of Concepcion, Tarlac) in the town of Tarlac to Servillano "Mianong" Aquino, a general in the Philippine Revolution who later served as a member of the Malolos Congress, and Guadalupe Quiambao. He had two siblings: Gonzalo Aquino (1893–??) and Amando Aquino (1896–??), a half-sister, Fortunata Aquino (1905–??), and a half-brother, Herminio Aquino (1949–2021). He studied at the Colegio de San Juan de Letran in Manila and later at the University of Santo Tomas, where he earned his law degree in 1913, and was admitted to the bar the following year.

== Political career ==
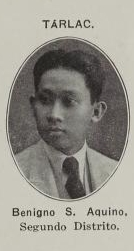
Aquino as member of the House of Representatives, c. 1921

Aquino was first elected to the Philippine Legislature as a member of the Philippine House of Representatives in 1919 representing the 2nd district of Tarlac. He was reelected to the same position in 1922 and 1925 before winning a Philippine Senate seat in 1928 representing the 3rd Senatorial District comprising the provinces of Bulacan, Nueva Ecija, Pampanga and his home-province of Tarlac. He became part of the Philippine Independence Mission in 1931, which negotiated the terms of obtaining Philippine independence from the United States.

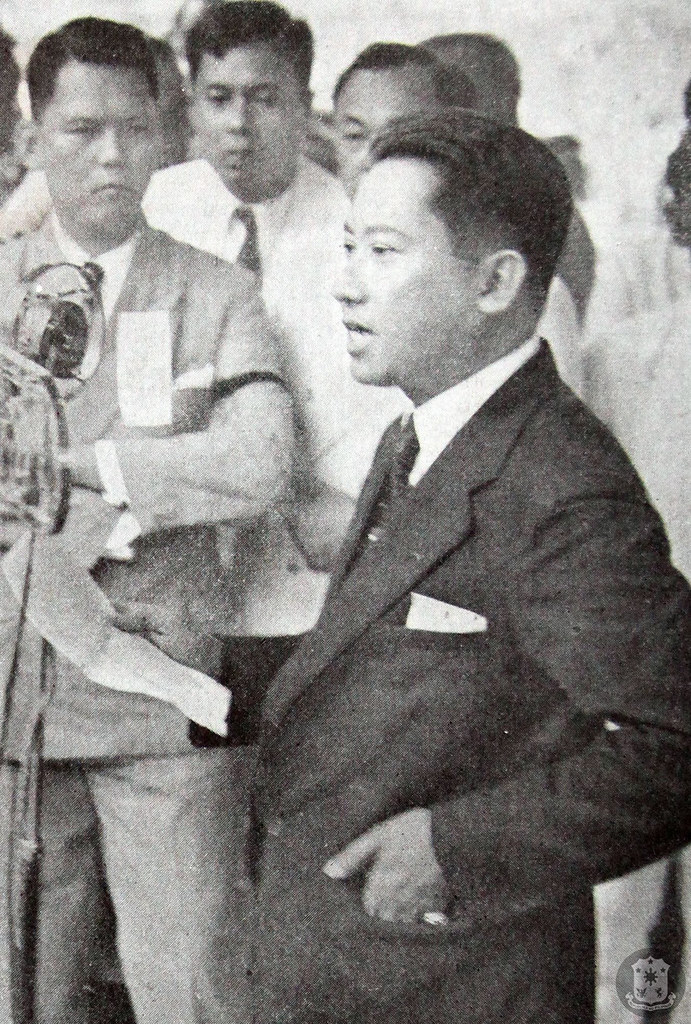
Aquino in 1936

During the elections for the Commonwealth of the Philippines government in 1935 he ran again in his district in Tarlac and won, this time as a member of the National Assembly. In 1937, he was appointed by Commonwealth President Manuel L. Quezon as secretary of agriculture and commerce.

=== Speaker of the National Assembly ===
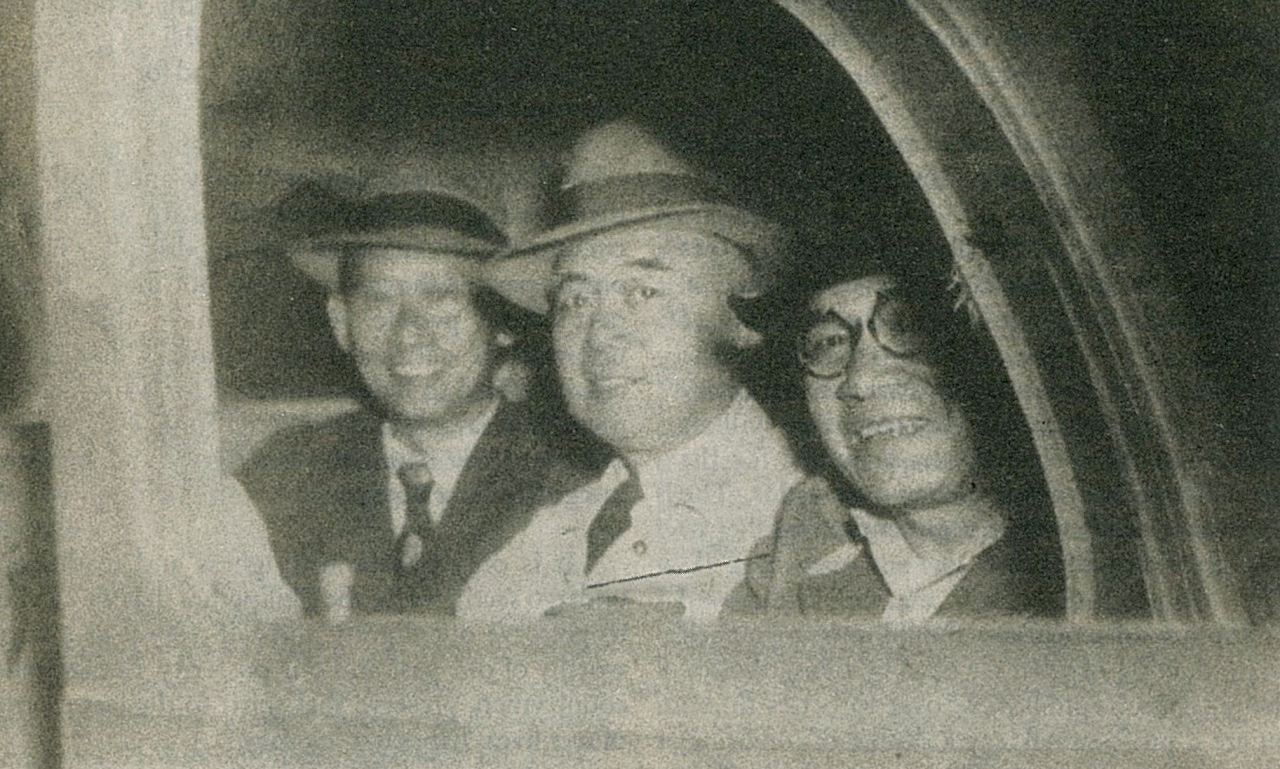
Aquino (left) with Jose P. Laurel (right) and Jorge B. Vargas (center)

Being among the more prominent Commonwealth officials remaining in the country after the Commonwealth government went into exile in 1941, Aquino was among those recruited by the Japanese to form a government. He became the director-general of KALIBAPI and one of the two assistant chairmen of the Preparatory Commission for Philippine Independence. When the Second Philippine Republic was inaugurated, he was elected Speaker of the National Assembly.

=== Arrest and collaboration charges ===
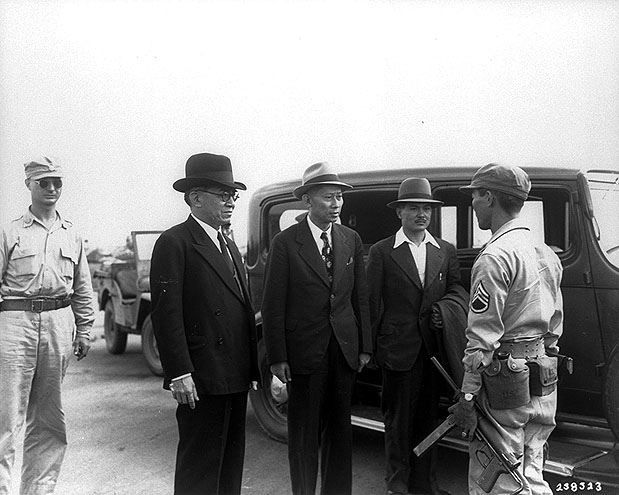
Aquino (center) with Jose P. Laurel (2nd from left) and Jose Laurel III (2nd from right) in 1945.

In December 1944, as the combined Filipino and American forces continued their advance to liberate the Philippines from Japanese forces, the government of the Second Philippine Republic, which included Aquino, was moved to Baguio. Subsequently, they travelled to Tuguegarao, where they were flown to Japan via Formosa (now Taiwan) and Shanghai, China. On September 15, 1945, while in Nara, Aquino, alongside former President Jose P. Laurel and his son Jose III, was arrested and placed into custody by Americans led by Colonel Turner following the surrender of Japan. They were imprisoned at Yokohama prison and two months later at Sugamo Prison. On July 23, 1946, they were flown back to the Philippines for trial on treason charges by the People's Court. A few weeks later, he was released on bail.

== Personal life ==
=== First marriage ===
In May 1916, he married Maria Urquico, the daughter of katipunero Antonio Urquico and Justa Valeriano. He had two sons and two daughters with Maria: Antonio Aquino "Tony" (1917–1993), Servillano Aquino II "Billy" (1919–1973), Milagros Aquino "Mila" (1924–2001), and Erlinda Aquino "Linda" (1926–2022).

=== Second marriage ===
After Maria died in March 1928, he married Aurora Lampa Aquino (maiden name, granddaughter of Melencio Aquino and Evarista de los Santos and daughter of Agapito de los Santos Aquino and Gerarda Miranda Lampa) on December 6, 1930, with whom he had seven children—Maria Aurora (Maur), Benigno Simeon Jr. (Ninoy), Maria Gerarda (Ditas), Maria Guadalupe (Lupita), Agapito (Butz), Paul, and Maria Teresa (Tessie).

== Death ==
On December 20, 1947, Aquino died of a heart attack at the Rizal Memorial Coliseum in Manila while watching a boxing match.

== Ancestry ==
Ancestors of Benigno Aquino Sr.

8. Hilario Aquino
4. Braulio Aquino
9. Isabela Lacsamana
2. Servillano Aquino
10. Dionisio Aguilar
5. Petrona Aguilar
22. Mariano de Hipolito
11. Juana Petrona de Hipolito
23. Juana Ildefonsa Miranda
1. Benigno Aquino
6. Pablo Quiambao
3. Guadalupe Quiambao
28. Manuel Tañedo
14. Vicente Tañedo
29. María Castañeda
7. Lorenza Tañedo
15. Fausta García

== See also ==
- Second Philippine Republic
- National Assembly of the Second Philippine Republic
- Speaker of the House of Representatives of the Philippines
- Benigno Aquino Jr.
