= 1919 Philippine legislative election =

- June 3, 1919
- Senate election

11 of the 24 seats in the Philippine Senate
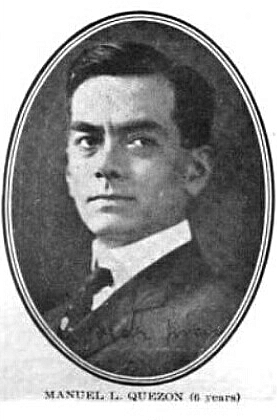

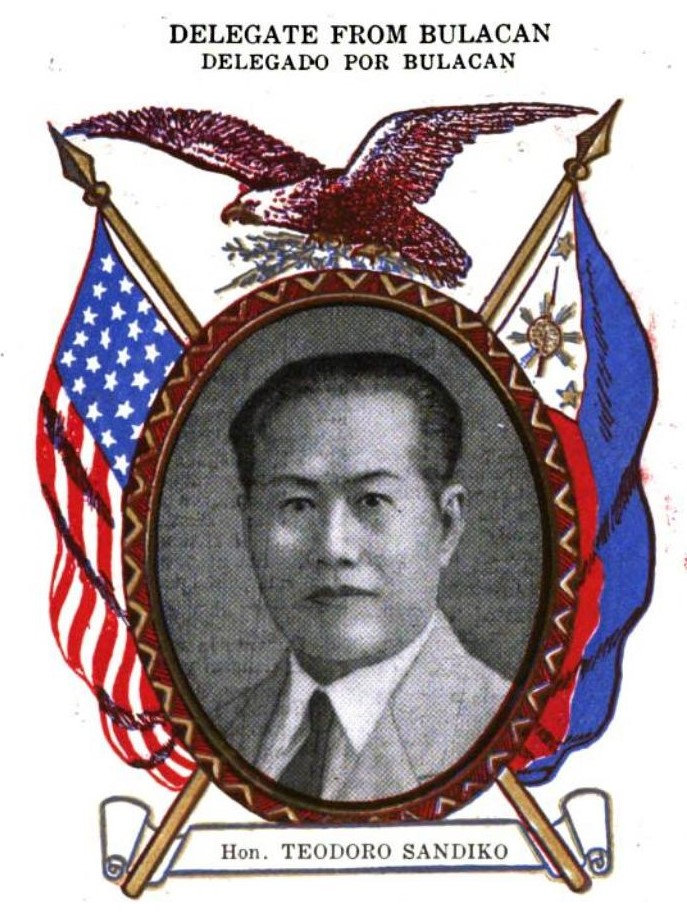
	First party	Second party
Leader	Manuel L. Quezon	Teodoro Sandiko
Party	Nacionalista	Democrata
Leader's seat	5th District	3rd District
Seats before	21	New
Seats won	9	1
Seats after	20	1
Seat change	▼1	New
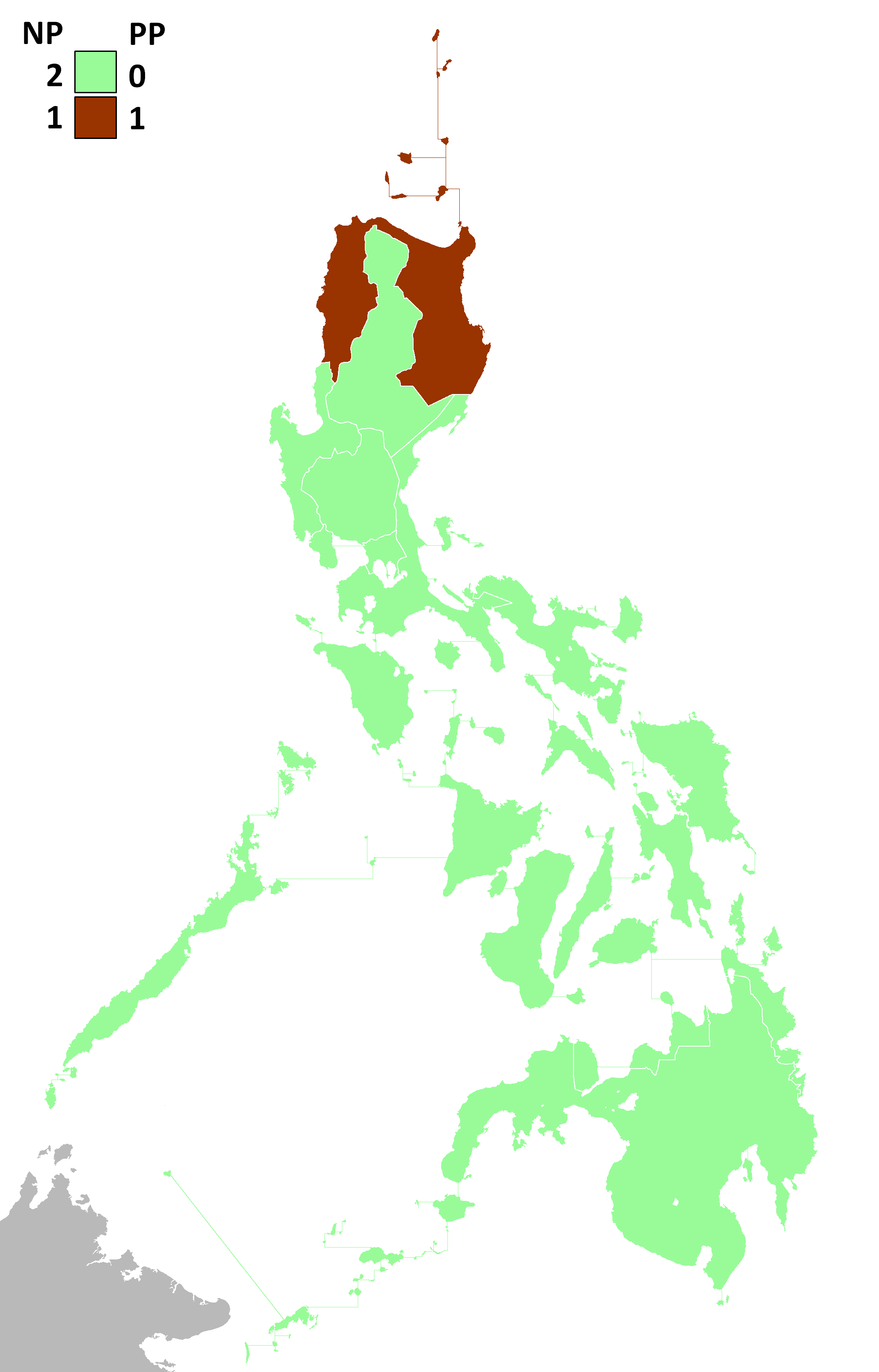
- Election results; each district sent in two seats to the Senate.
Senate President before election
Manuel L. Quezon
Nacionalista
Elected Senate President
Manuel L. Quezon
Nacionalista
- House of Representatives election

All 90 seats in the House of Representatives of the Philippines 46 seats needed for a majority
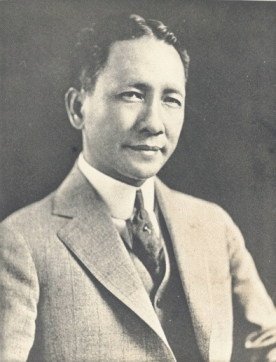

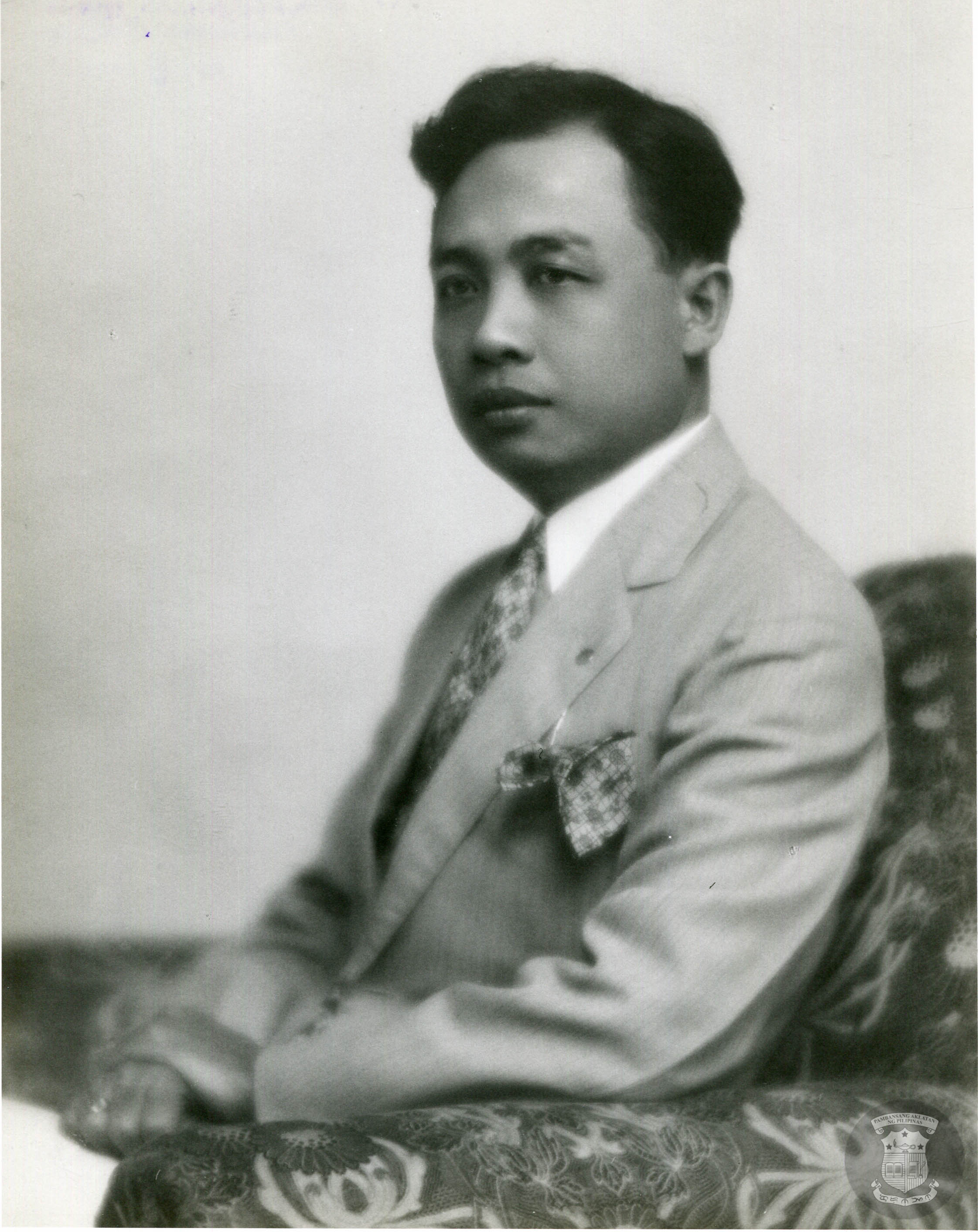
	First party	Second party
Leader	Sergio Osmeña	Claro M. Recto
Party	Nacionalista	Democrata
Leader's seat	Cebu–2nd	Batangas–3rd
Seats won	83	4
Seat change	▲8	▼5
Speaker before election
Sergio Osmeña
Nacionalista
Elected Speaker
Sergio Osmeña
Nacionalista

Elections for the Philippine Legislature were held on June 3, 1919, pursuant to Jones Law of 1916 which prescribed elections for every three years for both chambers of legislature. Voters elected all 90 members of the House of Representatives in the House of Representatives elections; and 11 out of 24 members of the Senate in the Senate elections. This is the first time that two chambers held elections in the same date.

== Background ==
Months before the election, Filipino electoral politics had become closely tied to independence demand. With that, Nacionalistas utilized their opportunity to consolidate as the main vehicle for Filipino nationalist aspirations. With multiple success in the past elections, it strengthen their narrative of Filipino leaders that the institutions installed by the American Insular Government had matured sufficiently for self-government.

The elections reinforced the political power of Senate President Manuel Quezon to emerge as the leading voice for Philippine independence in Washington.

== Results ==
=== Senate results ===
↓

20	1	1	1	1
Nacionalista	V	I	D	P

Party	Votes	%	Seats				
Party	Votes	%	Up	Before	Won	After	+/−
Nacionalista			10	19	9	18	−1
Progresista			0	1	0	1	0
Democrata			0	0	1	1	New
Independent			1	1	1	1	0
Appointed (Note: The two appointed senators were from Nacionalista.)			0	2	0	2	0
Vacancy			0	1	0	1	0
Total			11	24	11	24	0
Total votes	672,122	–					
Registered voters/turnout	717,295	93.70					

=== House of Representatives results ===
↓

83	7	7
Nacionalista	Democrata	Independent

Party	Seats	+/–
Nacionalista Party	83	+8
Democrata Party	4	+2
Independent	3	−2
Total	90	0

== See also ==
- 5th Philippine Legislature
- 1919 Philippine Senate elections
- 1919 Philippine House of Representatives elections
