= 1928 legislative election =

1928 legislative elections can refer to:

- 1928 Greek legislative election
- 1928 French legislative election
- 1928 Luxembourgian legislative election
- 1928 Philippine legislative election
- 1928 Polish legislative election
