= 1919 legislative election =

1919 legislative elections can refer to:

- 1919 French legislative election
- 1919 Georgian legislative election
- 1919 Luxembourgian legislative election
- 1919 Philippine legislative election
- 1919 Polish legislative election
