= Chito Santa Romana =

Philippine journalist and diplomat (1948–2022)

His Excellency Jose Santiago "Chito" Santa Romana
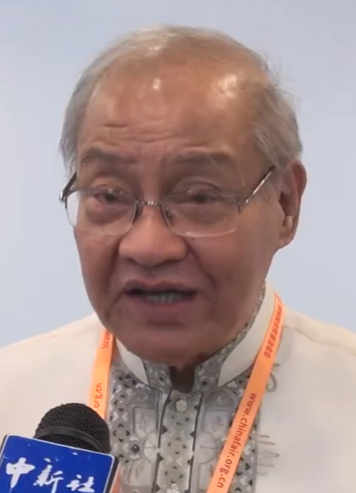

Ambassador of the Philippines to China
- In office September 28, 2016 – April 19, 2022
- President: Rodrigo Duterte
- Preceded by: Erlinda Basilio
- Succeeded by: Jaime FlorCruz

Personal details
- Born: Jose Santiago L. Santa Romana; January 15, 1948 Manila, Philippines
- Died: April 19, 2022 (aged 74) Huangshan, China

Jose Santiago "Chito" L. Santa Romana (January 15, 1948 – April 19, 2022), was a Philippine journalist and diplomat who served as the country's ambassador to China from 2016 until his death in 2022. His appointment came during the Philippines' growing alignment with China under the presidency of Rodrigo Duterte.

In August 1971, Sta. Romana was on a tour in China with other students when an arrest warrant was issued against him and four other students in the aftermath of the Plaza Miranda bombing in Manila, which forced him and others into exile in China. He returned to the Philippines 15 years later in March 1986, after the People Power Revolution ousted President Ferdinand Marcos and his family from power.

As a broadcast journalist in the United States, Sta. Romana served as ABC News's China correspondent from the 1980s until 2011. In 2000, he and his ABC team won a News and Documentary Emmy Award.

== Early life ==
Born in Manila, Sta. Romana was the grandson of Senator Santiago Lucero, for whom he was named.

== Activism and exile ==
As a young man, Sta. Romana studied at De La Salle University and was active in the anti-government demonstrations known as the First Quarter Storm in early 1970, as well as the Diliman Commune at the University of the Philippines (UP) in February 1971. As a student, he visited the People's Republic of China in August 1971 as the head of a Philippine youth delegation. However, that same month, Philippine President Ferdinand Marcos began issuing arrest warrants against those potentially involved in the Plaza Miranda bombing, including student activists such as Romana, and thus he was forced to stay in China along with Jaime FlorCruz and Diliman Commune leader Ericson Baculinao. Due to his exile, he was unable to finish his master's degree in economics at UP. During their time in China, Romana and Baculinao moved from Hunan to Beijing to study Mandarin at the Beijing Language Institute (now Beijing Language and Culture University), with Romana later becoming a translation editor.

In March 1986, in the aftermath of the People Power Revolution that ousted President Marcos and his family from power, both Sta. Romana and Baculinao managed to return to the Philippines after 15 years of exile in China.

In 1987, Sta. Romana went to the Fletcher School of Law and Diplomacy at Tufts University in the United States to pursue a master's degree in international relations. After graduation, due to the continued instability in the Philippines, Sta. Romana returned to China. From 1989 to 2010, Romana served as a long-term reporter for the American Broadcasting Company (ABC) in Beijing. In 2011, Sta. Romana returned to the Philippines and joined the Philippine Rural Reconstruction Movement in 2012.

== Ambassador to China ==
On September 28, 2016, Sta. Romana was appointed by President Rodrigo Duterte as the Philippine ambassador to China, with concurrent accreditation to North Korea and Mongolia. His appointment came amidst the Philippines' growing alignment with China under Duterte's presidency. Sta. Romana presented his credentials in March of the following year. He "played a key role in repairing once-tattered bilateral relations".

== Death ==
On April 18, 2022, Sta. Romana died of illness while undergoing quarantine for COVID-19 in Huangshan, Anhui Province while serving as the ambassador to China, at the age of 74. After his death, he was described as "an old friend of the Chinese people", and was succeeded by Jaime FlorCruz, a former activist who had previously went into exile in China alongside Sta. Romana in 1971.
