= Misamis's at-large congressional district =

Legislative district of the Philippines

The formerly undivided province of Misamis was represented in a Philippine national legislature as an at-large district in one occasion. Three delegates were appointed to represent the province in the National Assembly of the First Philippine Republic in 1898. After the province was reorganized under U.S. civilian rule in 1901, two districts were created for Misamis ahead of the elections for the first fully elected Philippine Assembly in 1907.

== Representation history ==
#	Term of office		National Assembly	Seat A				Seat B				Seat C			
#	Start	End	National Assembly	Image	Member	Party	Electoral history	Image	Member	Party	Electoral history	Image	Member	Party	Electoral history
=== Misamis's at-large district for the Malolos Congress ===
District created June 18, 1898.
–	September 15, 1898	March 23, 1901	1st		Gracio Gonzaga	Independent	Appointed.		Apolonio Mercado	Independent	Appointed.		Teodoro Sandiko	Independent	Appointed.
District dissolved into Misamis's 1st and 2nd districts for the Philippine Assembly.

== See also ==
- Legislative districts of Misamis Occidental
- Legislative districts of Misamis Oriental
