= 1925 Philippine legislative election =

- June 2, 1925
- Senate election

11 of the 24 seats in the Philippine Senate
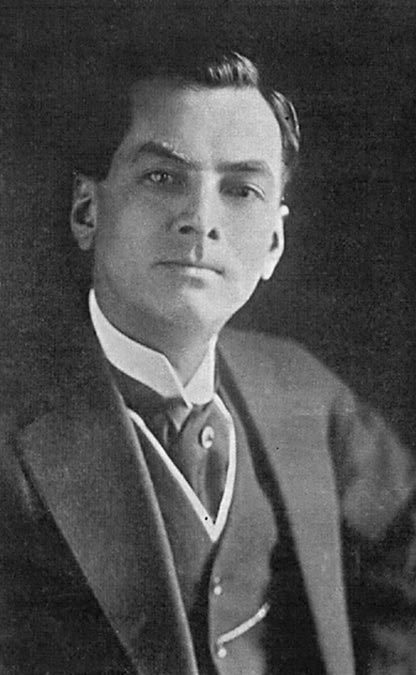

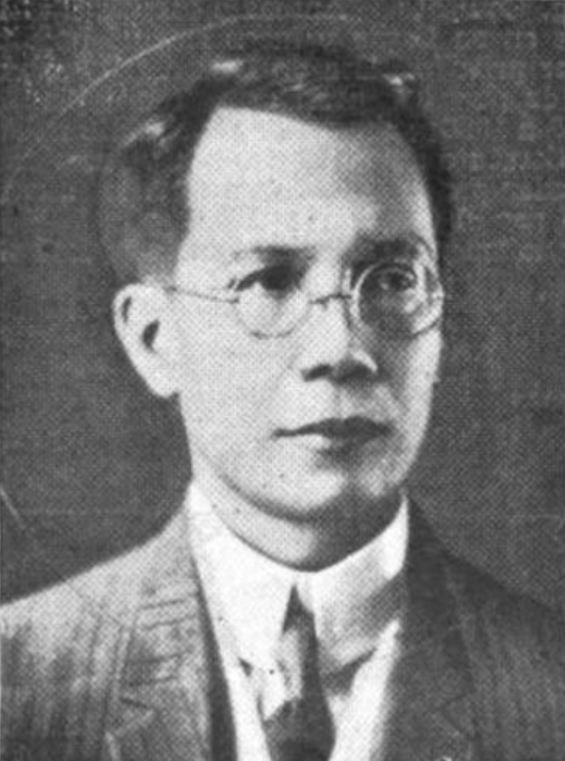
	First party	Second party
Leader	Manuel L. Quezon	Juan Sumulong
Party	Nacionalista	Democrata
Leader's seat	5th District	4th District
Seats before	16	7
Seats won	7	4
Seats after	13	10
Seat change	▼3	▲3
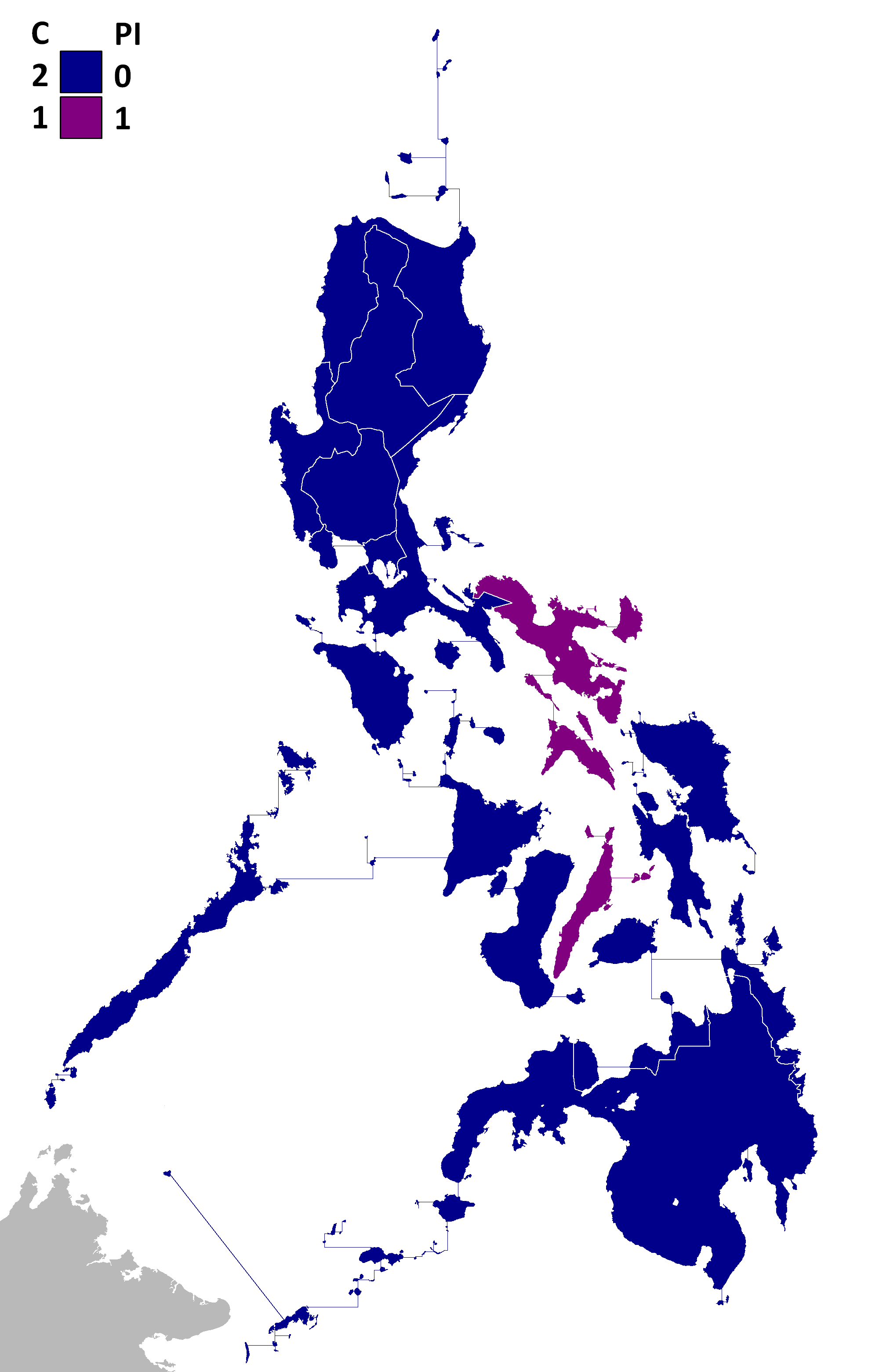
- Election results; each district sent in two seats to the Senate.
Senate President before election
Manuel L. Quezon
Nacionalista
Elected Senate President
Manuel L. Quezon
Nacionalista
- House of Representatives election

All 92 seats in the House of Representatives of the Philippines 47 seats needed for a majority
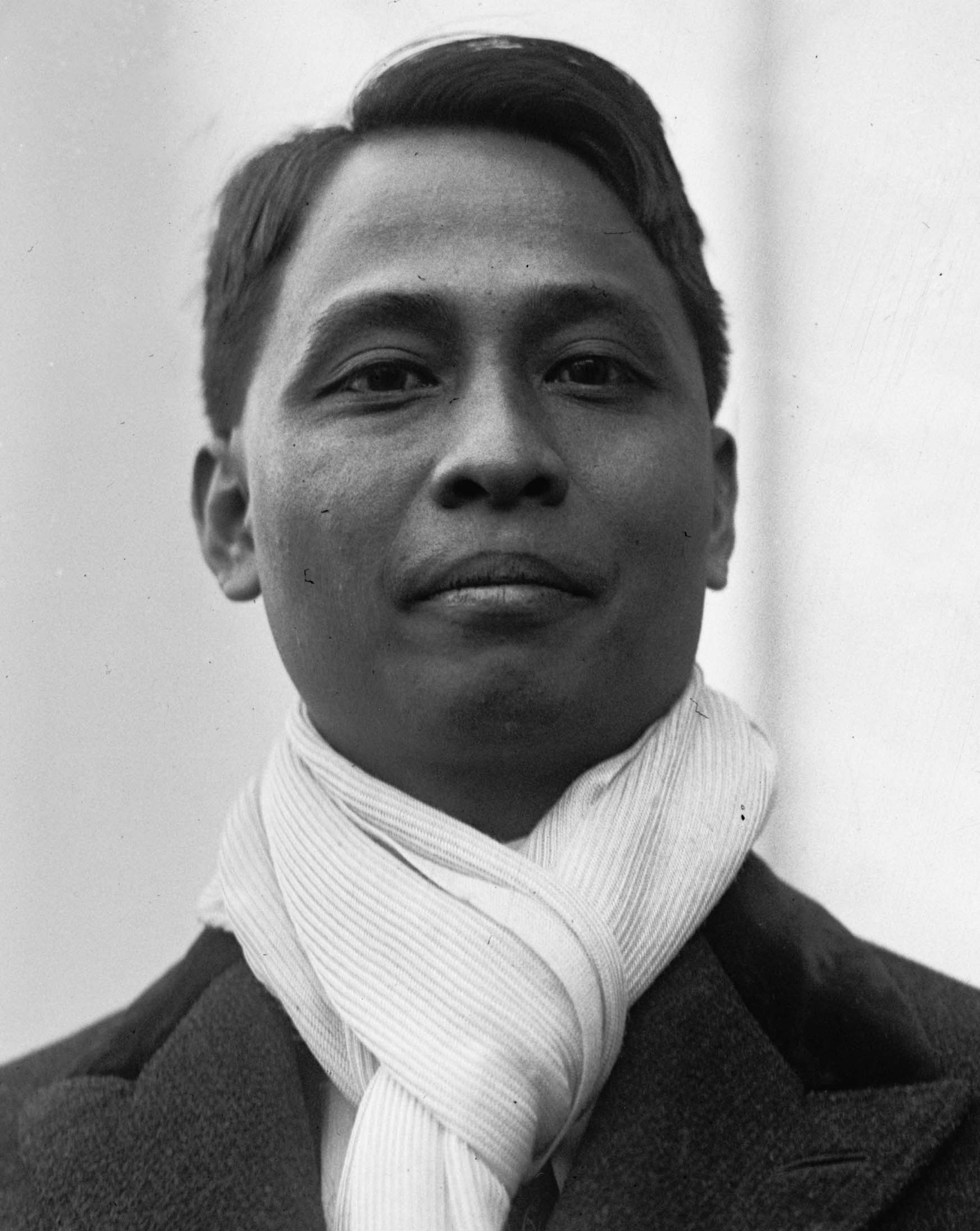

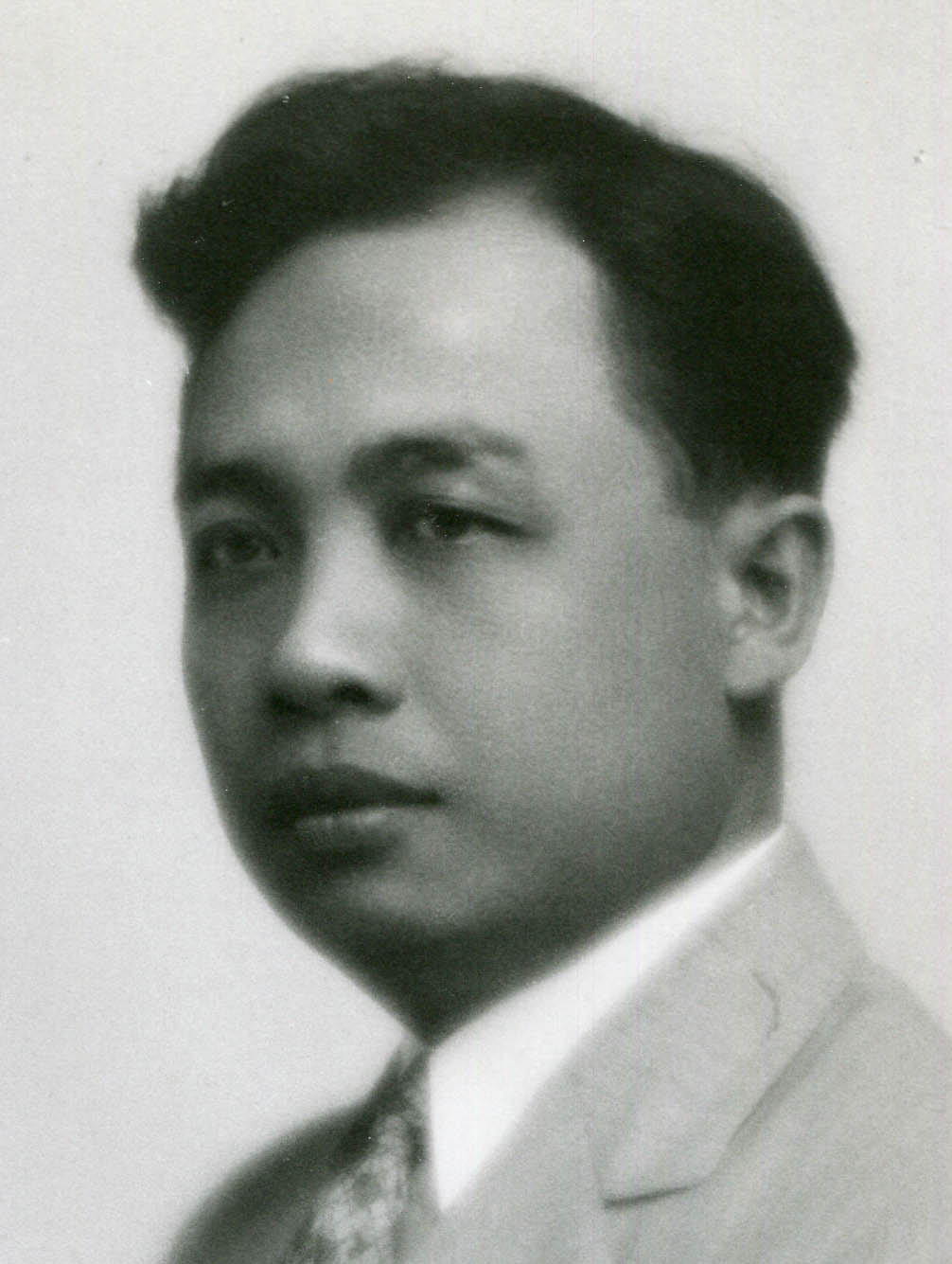
	First party	Second party
Leader	Manuel Roxas	Claro M. Recto
Party	Nacionalista Consolidado	Democrata
Leader's seat	Capiz–1st	Batangas–3rd
Seats won	64	22
Seat change	Steady	▼4
Speaker before election
Manuel Roxas
Nacionalista
Elected Speaker
Manuel Roxas
Nacionalista

Elections to the Philippine Legislature were held on June 2, 1925, pursuant to the pursuant to the Jones Law of 1916 which prescribed elections for every three years for both chambers of legislature. Votes elected 90 members of the House of Representatives in the Philippine House of Representatives elections; and 11 out of 24 members of the Senate in the Philippine Senate elections.

== Background ==
The 1925 elections were held amid growing political tensions between Filipino legislative leaders and the American insular government due to the Cabinet Crisis happened in 1923. The Filipino cabinet filed resignation in protesting Governor-General Leonard Wood's reinstatement of American detective Mike Conley of Manila Police Department.

Also, even Partido Nacionalista remain dominant force of Philippine politics, divisions inside the party increasingly influenced legislative politics during the period.

The elections reflected both continued nationalist opposition of Filipino leaders to American intervention and decisions, with factionalism still intact inside of the Filipino political elite under the institutions established by the Jones Act of 1916.

== Results ==
=== Senate results ===
↓

13	1	10
Nacionalista	V	Democrata

Party	Seats				
Party	Up	Before	Won	After	+/−
Nacionalista (Note: In the 1922 election, the Nacionalista Party was divided into the Colectivistas, which had 12 seats, and the Unipersonalistas, which had 6 seats. The two factions reconciled prior to this election.)	10	16	7	13	−3
Democrata	1	5	4	8	+3
Appointed (Note: The two appointed senators were from Democrata.)	0	2	0	2	0
Vacant	0	1	0	1	0
Total	11	24	11	24	0

=== House of Representatives result ===
↓

64	22	6
Nacionalista Consolidado	Democrata	Ind.

Party	Seats	+/–
Nacionalista Party Consolidado	64	New
Democrata Party	22	−4
Independent	6	+3
Total	92	−1

== See also ==
- 7th Philippine Legislature
- 1925 Philippine Senate elections
- 1925 Philippine House of Representatives elections
