= Jaime FlorCruz =

Filipino journalist and diplomat

His Excellency Jaime FlorCruz
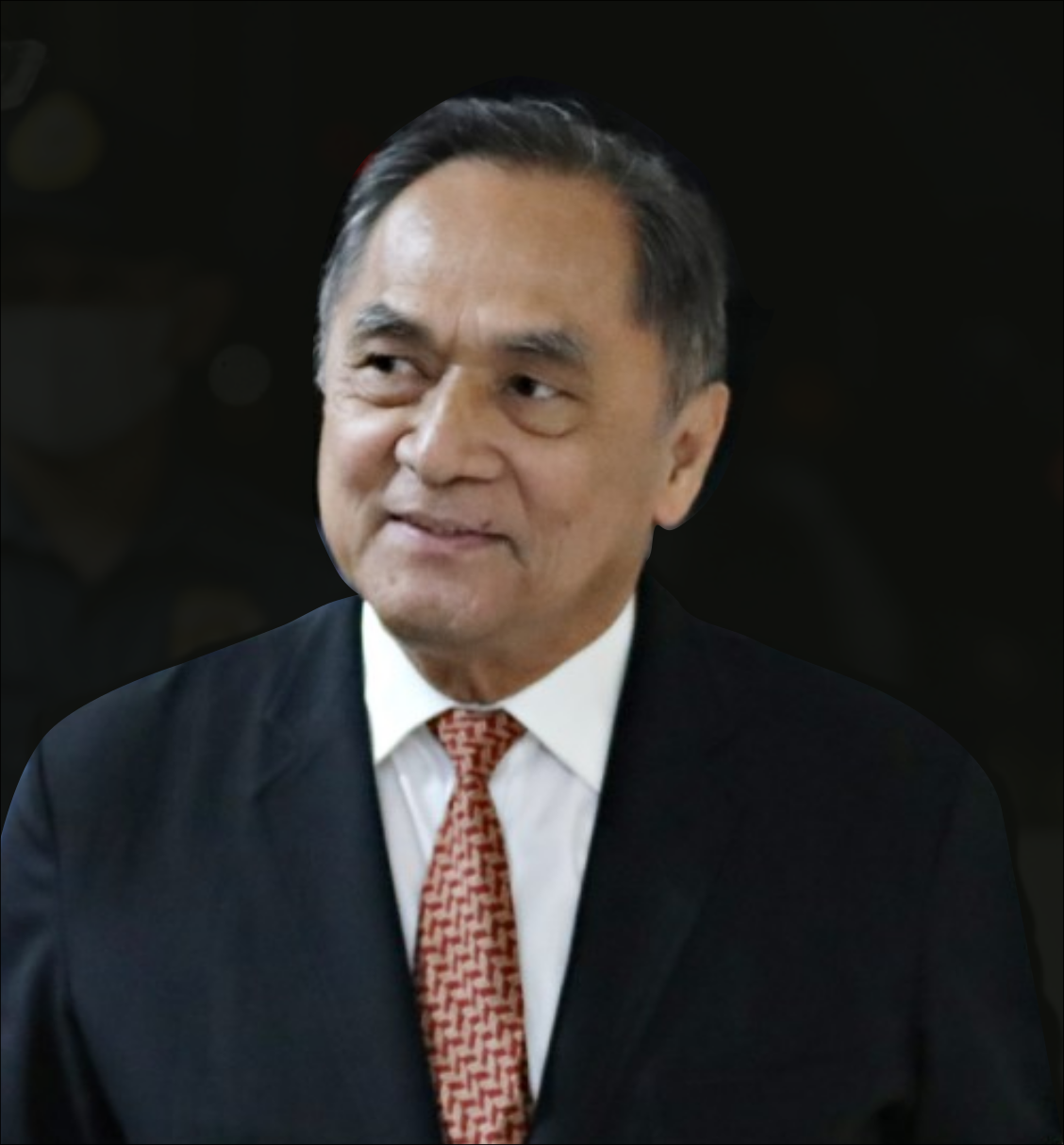
- FlorCruz in 2023

Ambassador of the Philippines to China
- Incumbent
- Assumed office February 24, 2023
- President: Bongbong Marcos
- Preceded by: Jose Santiago Santa Romana

Personal details
- Born: Jaime Adriano FlorCruz; April 5, 1951 (age 75) Malolos, Bulacan, Philippines
- Education: Polytechnic University of the Philippines (B.A.); Peking University (B.A.)
- Occupation: Journalist, columnist, publisher, news publisher

Jaime Adriano FlorCruz (born April 5, 1951) is a Filipino journalist and diplomat with a career spanning more than four decades, including a tenure as CNN's Beijing bureau chief. He has reported on a wide range of topics on China, including the country's political and economic developments, as well as its cultural and social issues. In 2022, he was appointed Philippine Ambassador to the People’s Republic of China.

== Early life and education ==
FlorCruz was born in Malolos, Bulacan, in 1951.

In 1971, he finished his BA in advertising from the Philippine College of Commerce (later renamed the Polytechnic University of the Philippines). In August of that year, he became one of 14 young activists fighting against President Ferdinand Marcos and defied a government ban against travel to China by visiting the country for a study tour. A bombing at Plaza Miranda on August 21, 1971, put the group on a list of "subversives", causing FlorCruz to self-exile in China. Unable to enter a university, FlorCruz first worked on a farm in Hunan instead for several months, during which he learned basic Mandarin. In late 1972, he moved to Shandong province and worked on a fishing boat in Yantai. After leaving commercial fishing in 1974, he studied Mandarin for two years in Beijing and eventually enrolled in the Chinese history programme of Peking University as part of the class of 1977.

FlorCruz was reunited with his parents in 1978, when they visited China.

== Career ==
FlorCruz at the hearing for his confirmation as Ambassador of the Philippines to China on December 7, 2022

In 1982, he joined Time magazine's Beijing bureau, and served as Beijing bureau chief from 1990 to 2000, where he covered important stories such as the 1989 Tiananmen Square protests and the 1991 suicide of Jiang Qing, Mao Zedong's widow. During the Tiananmen Square protests, FlorCruz drove activists Liu Xiaobo and Hou Dejian to a safe house.

In 2000, he was the Edward R. Murrow Press Fellow at the Council on Foreign Relations in New York City, the first non-American journalist chosen for the fellowship. Afterwards, he joined CNN as a Beijing-based correspondent, covering a wide range of stories including the SARS outbreak in 2003 and the 2008 Beijing Olympics.

In 2022, he published his memoir Class of ’77: How My Classmates Changed China, documenting his career.

That same year, President Bongbong Marcos named FlorCruz as the envoy from the Philippines to China and was confirmed on December 7, 2022 as Ambassador to China.

== Personal life ==
FlorCruz and his wife Ana met in Manila and lived in Los Angeles, California.
