= 1919 Philippine Senate elections =

2nd Philippine senatorial election

1919 Philippine Senate election
- June 3, 1919

11 (of the 24) seats in the Philippine Senate
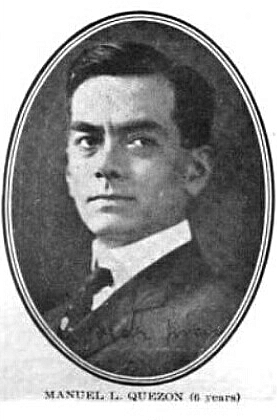

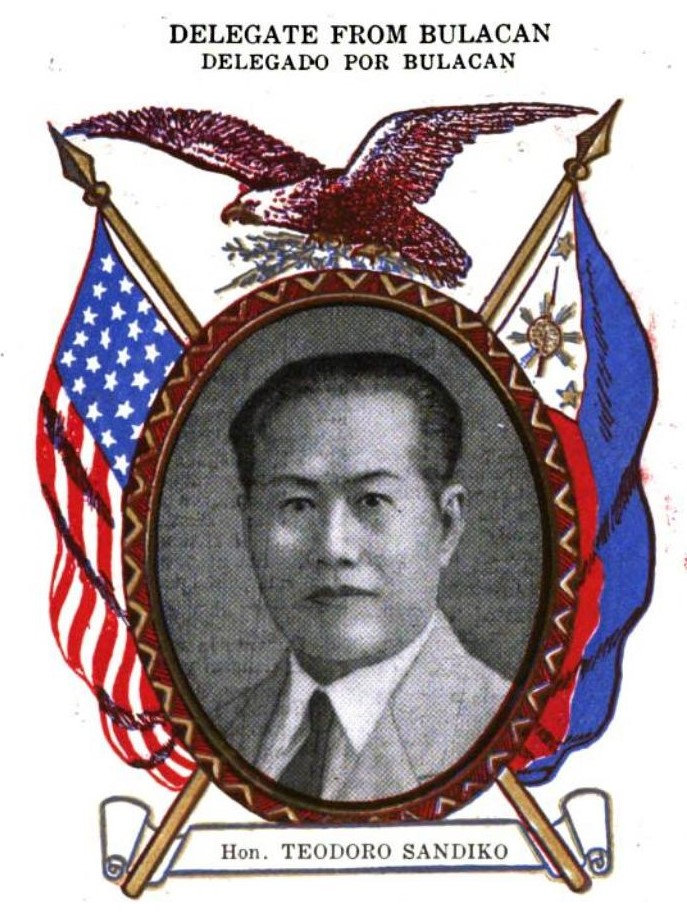
	Majority party	Minority party
Leader	Manuel L. Quezon	Teodoro Sandiko
Party	Nacionalista	Democrata
Leader's seat	5th District	3rd District
Seats before	21	New
Seats won	9	1
Seats after	20	1
Seat change	▼1	New
- Election results; each district sent in two seats to the Senate. 2 Nacionalistas 1 Nacionalista and 1 Progresista 1 Nacionalista and 1 Democrata 1 Nacionalista and 1 independent
Senate President before election
Manuel L. Quezon
Nacionalista
Elected Senate President
Manuel L. Quezon
Nacionalista

Senatorial elections happened on June 3, 1919 in the Philippines under the Jones Law provisions. There were 717,295 registered voters, of whom 672,122, or 92 percent, voted.

== Electoral system ==
In a staggered election, the seats of the senators who were second place in 1916 were up for election. The Philippines is divided into 12 senatorial districts, of which all districts save for the 12th district, has one of its seats up. In the 12th district, any vacancy is filled via appointment of the Governor-General. The election itself is via first-past-the-post.

== Results ==
↓

20	1	1	1	1
Nacionalista	V	I	D	P

=== Philippines's 1st senatorial district ===
Candidate	Party	Votes	%
Santiago Fonacier	Partido Nacionalista	20,406	42.72
Mauro Vergara	Partido Democrata Nacional	11,975	25.07
Irineo Javier	Partido Nacionalista	9,051	18.95
Honorio Lasan	Partido Nacionalista	6,335	13.26
Total		47,767	100.00
Total votes		47,767	–

=== Philippines's 2nd senatorial district ===
Candidate	Party	Votes	%
Bernabé de Guzmán	Partido Nacionalista	30,530	52.98
Teofilo Sison	Partido Nacionalista	27,091	47.02
Total		57,621	100.00
Total votes		57,621	–

=== Philippines's 3rd senatorial district ===
Candidate	Party	Votes	%
Teodoro Sandiko	Partido Democrata Nacional	23,487	65.34
Isauro Gabaldon	Partido Nacionalista	12,458	34.66
Total		35,945	100.00

=== Philippines's 4th senatorial district ===
Candidate	Party	Votes	%
Pedro Guevara	Partido Nacionalista	37,674	58.60
Juan Sumulong	Partido Democrata Nacional	26,615	41.40
Total		64,289	100.00
Total votes		64,289	–

=== Philippines's 5th senatorial district ===
Candidate	Party	Votes	%
Antero Soriano	Partido Nacionalista	26,350	50.17
Emiliano Tria Tirona	Partido Democrata Nacional	26,176	49.83
Total		52,526	100.00
Total votes		52,526	–

=== Philippines's 6th senatorial district ===
Candidate	Party	Votes	%
Vicente de Vera	Partido Democrata Nacional	18,935	53.80
Mario Guariña	Partido Nacionalista	16,257	46.20
Total		35,192	100.00

=== Philippines's 7th senatorial district ===
Candidate	Party	Votes	%
Jose Maria Arroyo	Partido Nacionalista	16,849	51.19
Ruperto Montinola	Partido Democrata Nacional	15,344	46.62
Total		32,193	100.00
Total votes		32,913	–

=== Philippines's 8th senatorial district ===
Candidate	Party	Votes	%
Hermenegildo Villanueva	Partido Nacionalista	18,335	56.69
Angel Salazar	Partido Democrata Nacional	14,007	43.31
Total		32,342	100.00

=== Philippines's 9th senatorial district ===
Candidate	Party	Votes	%
Francisco Enage	Partido Nacionalista	12,000	60.10
Jose Maria Veloso	Partido Nacionalista	7,968	39.90
Total		19,968	100.00
Total votes		19,968	–

=== Philippines's 10th senatorial district ===
Candidate	Party	Votes	%
Celestino Rodriguez	Partido Nacionalista	21,012	73.57
Vicente Sotto	Partido Democrata Nacional	7,547	26.43
Total		28,559	100.00
Total votes		28,559	–

=== Philippines's 11th senatorial district ===
Candidate	Party	Votes	%
Francisco Soriano	Partido Nacionalista	8,341	62.39
Troadio Galicano	Partido Democrata Nacional	5,028	37.61
Total		13,369	100.00

=== Philippines's 12th senatorial district* ===
Candidate	Party
Hadji Butu	Partido Nacionalista
Joaquin Luna	Partido Nacionalista
Total

- Non-elective positions. Appointed by the American Governor-General

=== Results by party ===
Party	Seats
Nacionalista	20
Progresista	1
Independent	1
Total	22

=== October 25, 1919 Special Election for Philippines's 3rd senatorial district ===
To serve the unexpired term of Senator Francisco Tongio Liongson, who died in office on February 20, 1919. The winner will serve until 1922.

Candidate	Party	Votes	%
Ceferino de Leon	Partido Nacionalista	43,765	68.54
Jose Alejandrino	Partido Democrata Nacional	20,085	31.46
Total		63,850	100.00

Party	Votes	%	Seats				
Party	Votes	%	Up	Before	Won	After	+/−
Nacionalista			10	19	9	18	−1
Progresista			0	1	0	1	0
Democrata			0	0	1	1	New
Independent			1	1	1	1	0
Appointed (Note: The two appointed senators were from Nacionalista.)			0	2	0	2	0
Vacancy			0	1	0	1	0
Total			11	24	11	24	0
Total votes	672,122	–					
Registered voters/turnout	717,295	93.70					

== See also ==
- 1919 Philippine House of Representatives elections
- 5th Philippine Legislature
- Commission on Elections
- Politics of the Philippines
- Philippine elections
