= Ceferino de Leon =

Filipino politician

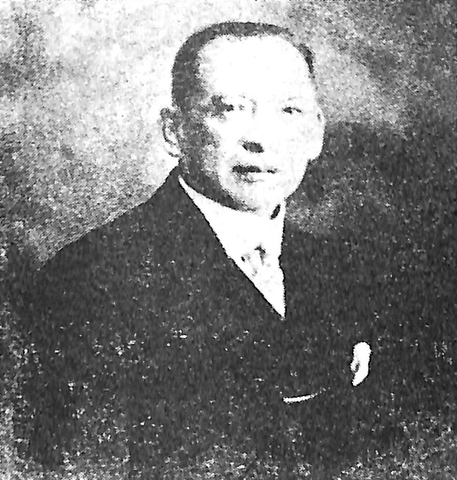

Senator of the Philippines from the 3rd district
- In office October 25, 1919 – June 6, 1922 Serving with Teodoro Sandiko
- Preceded by: Francisco Tongio Liongson
- Succeeded by: Santiago Lucero

Member of the House of Representatives of the Philippine Islands from Bulacan's 2nd district
- In office October 16, 1912 – October 16, 1916
- Preceded by: Mariano Ponce
- Succeeded by: Ricardo González Lloret

Personal details
- Born: August 29, 1859 San Miguel de Mayumo, Bulacan, Captaincy General of the Philippines
- Died: circa 1922 (aged 62–63) Philippine Islands
- Party: Nacionalista

Ceferino Santiago de Leon (August 29, 1859 – 1922 ) was a Filipino politician.

== Biography ==
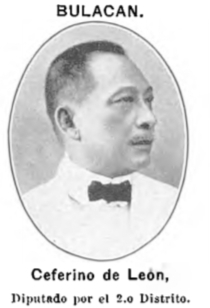
De Leon as a member of the Philippine Assembly, c. 1913

Ceferino de Leon was born on August 29, 1859, in San Miguel de Mayumo, Bulacan. He attended the University of Santo Tomas and completed a law degree at the Universidad Central de Madrid. According to historian Ambeth Ocampo, De Leon, while in Spain, unsuccessfully sought courtships with Leonor Rivera and Leonor Valenzuela, who were then also two of the future Philippine national hero Jose Rizal's love interests, during which he confronted Rizal after finding out that the latter was engaged to both women at the same time.

Upon his return to the Philippines, De Leon served as prosecutor (fiscal) of Barotac Viejo, Iloilo, and justice of the peace of his hometown of San Miguel. During the Philippine Revolution, de Leon served as the representative of Benguet to the Malolos Congress and helped draft the Constitution of the First Philippine Republic in 1899.

In the 1912 elections, de Leon was elected to the House of Representatives representing the first district of Bulacan. After the death of Senator Francisco Tongio Liongson in office, de Leon was elected in a special election on October 25, 1919, as his successor for the remainder of his term until 1922.

De Leon was married to Maria Roura. Their daughter Trinidad, was crowned as the Manila Carnival Queen in 1920 before marrying then-Capiz governor Manuel Roxas, and upon the latter's election as President of the Philippines, was first lady from 1946 to 1948.
