= 1928 Philippine legislative election =

- June 5, 1928
- Senate election

11 of the 24 seats in the Philippine Senate
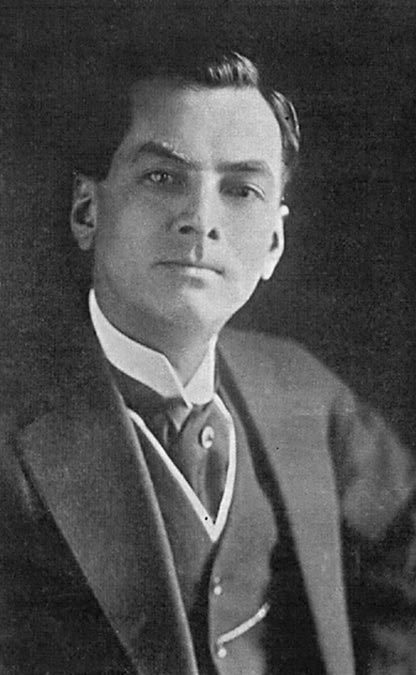

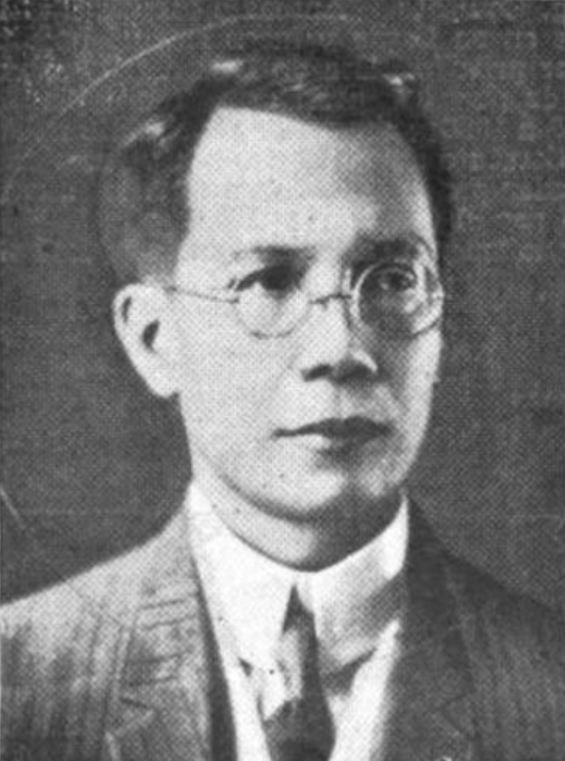
	First party	Second party
Leader	Manuel L. Quezon	Juan Sumulong
Party	Nacionalista	Democrata
Leader's seat	5th District	3rd District
Seats before	14	10
Seats won	9	2
Seats after	16	8
Seat change	▲2	▼2
Senate President before election
Manuel L. Quezon
Nacionalista
Elected Senate President
Manuel L. Quezon
Nacionalista
- House of Representatives election

All 94 seats in the House of Representatives of the Philippines 48 seats needed for a majority
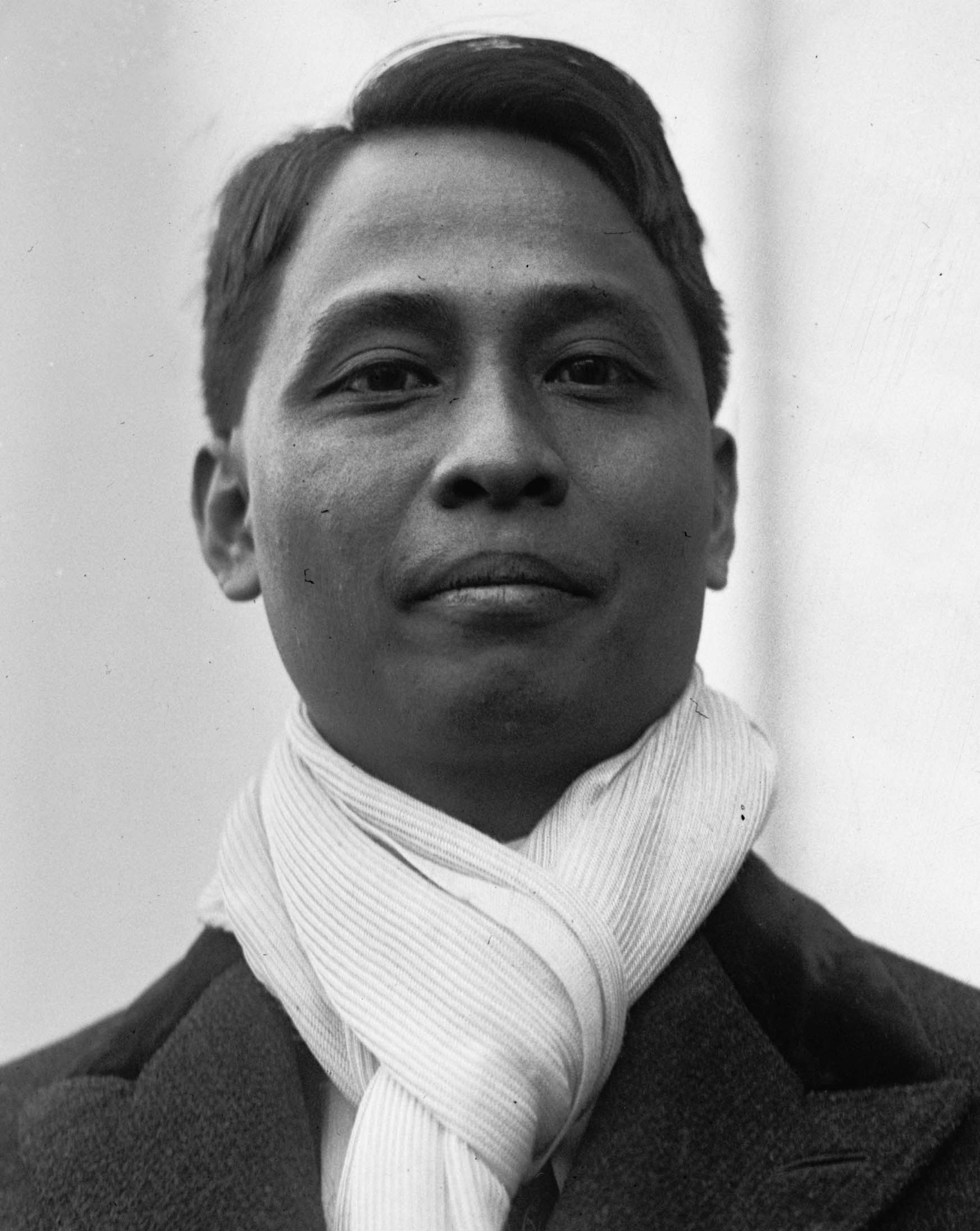

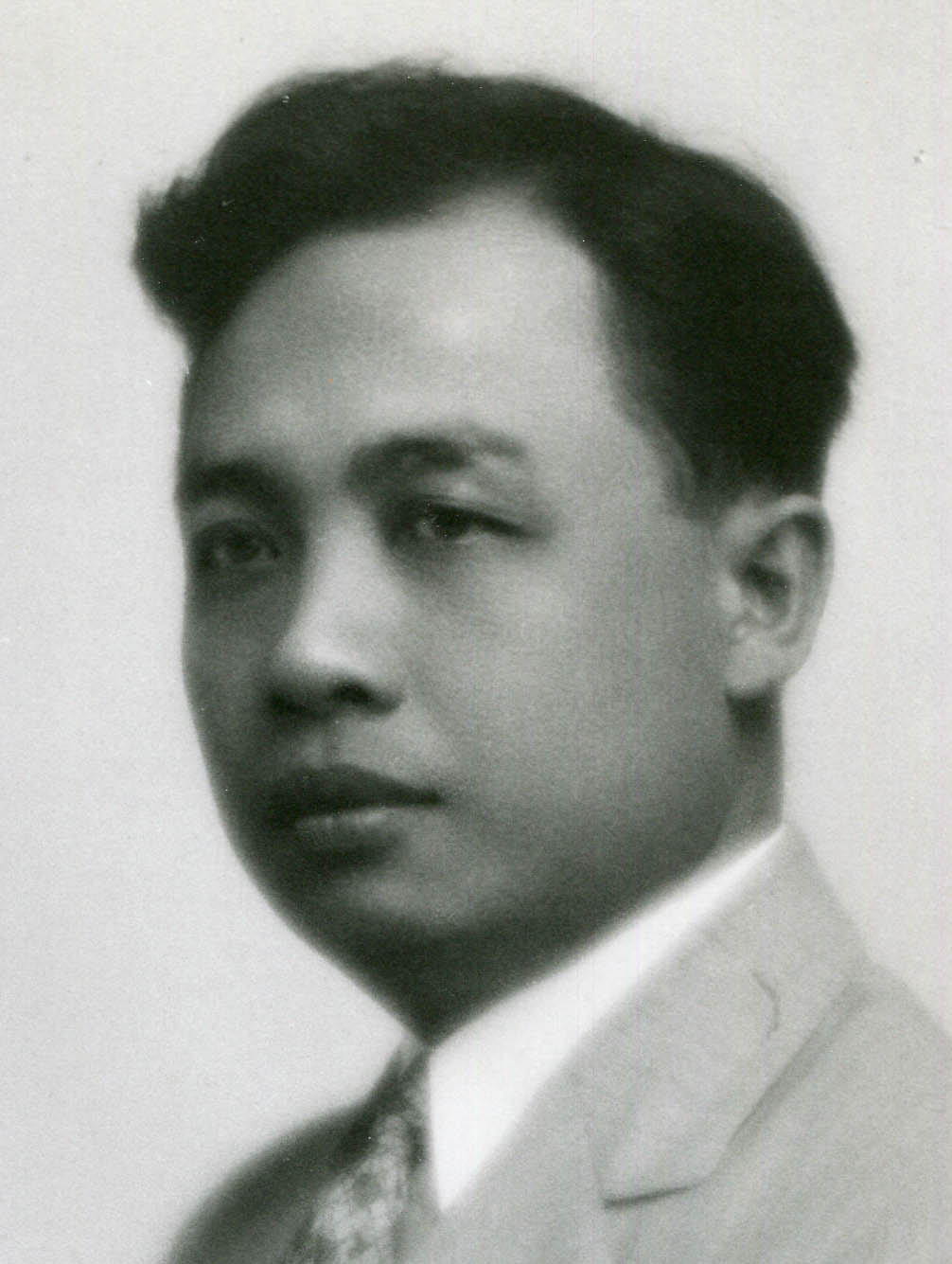
	First party	Second party
Leader	Manuel Roxas	Claro M. Recto
Party	Nacionalista Consolidado	Democrata
Leader's seat	Capiz–1st	Batangas–3rd
Last election	64	22
Seats won	71	16
Seat change	▲7	▼6
Speaker before election
Manuel Roxas
Nacionalista
Elected Speaker
Manuel Roxas
Nacionalista

Elections to the Philippine Legislature were held on June 5, 1928 pursuant to the Jones Law of 1916 which prescribed elections for every three years for both chambers of legislature. Votes elected 94 members of the House of Representatives in the House of Representatives elections; and 11 out of 24 members of the Senate in the Senate elections.

== Background ==
The 1928 elections still reflecting the continued factional rivalry inside Partido Nacionalista that shaped the Philippine politics during the late 1920s, even though they are already consolidated.

The elections took place shortly at the end of Governor-General Leonard Wood's administration, as he died from heart attack by 1927. Wood and Filipino leaders have confrontations with each other, as the former's political and administrative decisions that resulted to Filipino political leader's outrage against Insular Government.

By late 1920s, elections increasingly reflected competition among political elite and its factions rather than to disagree over independence initiative, as most major Filipino parties had adopted nationalist platforms favoring eventual sovereignty.

With economic talks increasingly focused on the Philippines' dependence on preferential access to American trading arena, concerns raised among Filipino leaders regarding the sustainable and long-term plans of the economic system imposed by the American government.

== Results ==
=== Senate results ===
↓

16	8
Nacionalista	Democrata

Party	Seats				
Party	Up	Before	Won	After	+/−
Nacionalista	7	14	9	16	+2
Democrata	4	8	2	6	−2
Appointed (Note: The two appointed senators were from Democrata.)	0	2	0	2	0
Total	11	24	11	24	2

=== House of Representatives results ===
↓

71	16	7
Nacionalista Consolidado	Democrata	IND

Party	Seats	+/–
Nacionalista Party Consolidado	71	+7
Democrata Party	16	−6
Independent	7	+1
Total	94	+2

== See also ==
- 8th Philippine Legislature
- 1928 Philippine Senate elections
- 1928 Philippine House of Representatives elections
