= Luis Morales (politician) =

Filipino lawyer and politician (1885–1938)

The Honorable Luis Lopez Morales
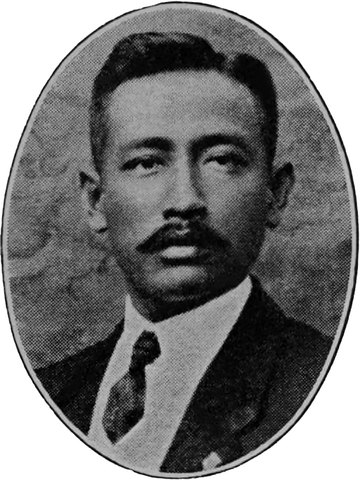
- Morales as member of the Philippine House of Representatives, c. 1921

Senator of the Philippines from the 3rd District
- In office 23 March 1926 – 5 June 1928 Serving with Teodoro Sandiko
- Preceded by: Santiago Lucero
- Succeeded by: Benigno Aquino Sr.

7th Governor of Tarlac
- In office 1922–1925
- Preceded by: Ernesto Gardiner
- Succeeded by: Manuel de Leon

Member of the House of Representatives from Tarlac's 1st district
- In office 16 October 1912 – 6 June 1922
- Preceded by: Mauricio Ilagan
- Succeeded by: Gregorio Bañaga

Personal details
- Born: August 25, 1885 Moncada, Tarlac, Captaincy General of the Philippines
- Died: February 9, 1938 (aged 52)
- Party: Democrata

Luis Lopez Morales (August 25, 1885 – February 9, 1938) was a Filipino lawyer and politician.

== Biography ==
Luis Lopez Morales was born on August 25, 1885, in Moncada, Tarlac. He received his Bachelor of Arts degree from the Liceo de Manila and his Bachelor of Laws degree from the Escuela de Derecho. He was admitted to the Bar in 1908.

Morales was elected for two consecutive terms in the House of Representatives to represent the 1st district of Tarlac from 1912 to 1922 and concurrently served as minority floor leader from 1919 to 1922. At the end of his stint in the lower house, he was elected as Governor of Tarlac, serving in that position until 1925. In 1926, he was elected to the Philippine Senate to represent the 3rd District in a special election to replace Santiago Lucero, who died in office, and served until 1928. He later became a delegate to the 1934 Constitutional Convention representing Tarlac.
