= Santiago Lucero (senator) =

Filipino politician and senator

The Honorable Santiago Lucero
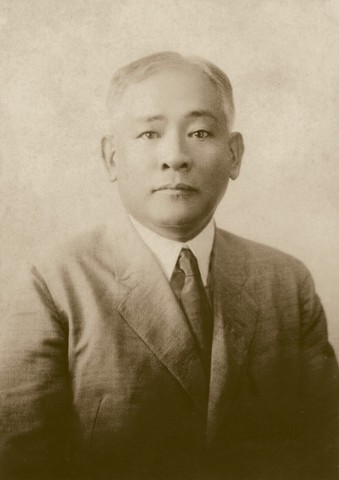

Senator of the Philippines from the 3rd District
- In office June 6, 1922 – November 2, 1925 Serving with Teodoro Sandiko
- Preceded by: Ceferino de León
- Succeeded by: Luís Morales

Personal details
- Born: December 29, 1870 Santa Isabel, Bulacan, Captaincy General of the Philippines
- Died: November 2, 1925 (aged 54)
- Party: Democrata

Santiago Estrella Lucero (December 29, 1870 – November 2, 1925) was a Filipino senator.

== Biography ==
Santiago Lucero was born on December 29, 1870, in Santa Isabel, now a barangay of Malolos, Bulacan, to Antonio Lucero. His family was constantly persecuted by Spanish authorities after his sister Loreto resisted an attempted sexual assault by a Spanish priest and filed a case against him, for which their father was falsely accused of being a subversive, and for which Santiago was also imprisoned. Despite this, Santiago served as a gobernadorcillo (mayor) of Santa Isabel for a long time.

During the Philippine-American War, Lucero fought for the Philippine revolutionary army against the Americans at the Battle of La Loma in 1899. He was captured and held until 1901. Following the end of hostilities, Lucero served as registrar of deeds in Nueva Ecija, and later became fiscal (prosecutor) of the province and of neighboring Tarlac.

In 1922, Lucero was elected to the Senate of the Philippines representing the 3rd senatorial district as a member of the Democrata Party. However, he died in office on November 2, 1925, and was replaced in a special election by Luís Morales.

== Legacy ==
The square in Cabanatuan, Nueva Ecija in which General Antonio Luna was assassinated in 1899, was renamed as Plaza Lucero in honor of the senator.

== Family ==
Lucero was married to Florentina Guzman and had seven children. He lived in San Isidro, Nueva Ecija. One of his children, Gloria Lucero-Monzon, co-founded the Sigma Delta Phi sorority at the University of the Philippines in 1931.

Lucero's grandson, Jose Santiago "Chito" Santa Romana, became a bureau chief for ABC News in China and served as the Philippine ambassador to the country. He was also named in honor of the senator. Lucero was also the grand-uncle of theater actress Cecilia Bulaong Garrucho.
