= Philippines's 3rd senatorial district =

- Former constituency for the Senate of the Philippines
- Provinces / Cities: Bulacan, Nueva Ecija, Pampanga, Tarlac
- Population: 1,102,990 (1935)
- Electorate: 221,199 (1935)

Former constituency
- Created: 1916
- Abolished: 1934

Philippines's 3rd senatorial district, officially the Third Senatorial District of the Philippine Islands (Spanish: Tercer Distrito Senatorial de las Islas Filipinas), was one of the twelve senatorial districts of the Philippines in existence between 1916 and 1935. It elected two members to the Senate of the Philippines, the upper chamber of the bicameral Philippine Legislature under the Insular Government of the Philippine Islands for each of the 4th to 10th legislatures. The district was created under the 1916 Jones Law from the east-central Luzon provinces of Bulacan, Nueva Ecija, Pampanga and Tarlac.

The district was represented by a total of nine senators throughout its existence. It was abolished in 1935 when a unicameral National Assembly was installed under a new constitution following the passage of the Tydings–McDuffie Act which established the Commonwealth of the Philippines. Since the 1941 elections when the Senate was restored after a constitutional plebiscite, all twenty-four members of the upper house have been elected countrywide at-large. It was last represented by Sotero Baluyut of the Nacionalista Democrático and Hermogenes Concepción of the Nacionalista Demócrata Pro-Independencia.

== List of senators ==
| Seat A | | | | | | | Legislature | Seat B | | | | | | |
| # | Image | Senator | Term of office | | Party | Electoral history | Legislature | # | Image | Senator | Term of office | | Party | Electoral history |
| # | Image | Senator | Start | End | Party | Electoral history | Legislature | # | Image | Senator | Start | End | Party | Electoral history |
| 1 | | Francisco Tongio Liongson | October 16, 1916 | February 20, 1919 | Nacionalista | Elected in 1916. Died. | 4th | 1 | | Isauro Gabaldón | October 16, 1916 | June 3, 1919 | Nacionalista | Elected in 1916. |
| 2 | | Ceferino de León | October 25, 1919 | June 6, 1922 | Nacionalista | Elected in 1919 to finish Liongson's term. | 5th | 2 | | Teodoro Sandiko | June 3, 1919 | June 2, 1931 | Demócrata | Elected in 1919. |
| 3 | | Santiago Lucero | June 6, 1922 | November 2, 1925 | Demócrata | Elected in 1922. Died. | 6th | 2 | | Teodoro Sandiko | June 3, 1919 | June 2, 1931 | Demócrata | Elected in 1919. |
| 3 | | Santiago Lucero | June 6, 1922 | November 2, 1925 | Demócrata | Elected in 1922. Died. | 7th | 2 | | Teodoro Sandiko | June 3, 1919 | June 2, 1931 | Demócrata | Re-elected in 1925. |
| 4 | | Luís Morales | March 23, 1926 | June 5, 1928 | Demócrata | Elected in 1926 to finish Lucero's term. | 7th | 2 | | Teodoro Sandiko | June 3, 1919 | June 2, 1931 | Demócrata | Re-elected in 1925. |
| 5 | | Benigno Aquino Sr. | June 5, 1928 | June 5, 1934 | Nacionalista; Consolidado | Elected in 1928. | 8th | 2 | | Teodoro Sandiko | June 3, 1919 | June 2, 1931 | Demócrata | Re-elected in 1925. |
| 5 | | Benigno Aquino Sr. | June 5, 1928 | June 5, 1934 | Nacionalista; Consolidado | Elected in 1928. | 9th | 3 | | Sotero Baluyut | June 2, 1931 | September 16, 1935 | Nacionalista; Consolidado | Elected in 1931. |
| 6 | | Hermogenes Concepcion | June 5, 1934 | September 16, 1935 | Nacionalista; Demócrata Pro-Independencia | Elected in 1934. | 10th | 3 | | Sotero Baluyut | June 2, 1931 | September 16, 1935 | Nacionalista; Democrático | Elected in 1931. |

== See also ==
- Senatorial districts of the Philippines
