= Teodoro Sandiko =

Filipino politician and lawyer

The Honorable Teodoro Sandiko
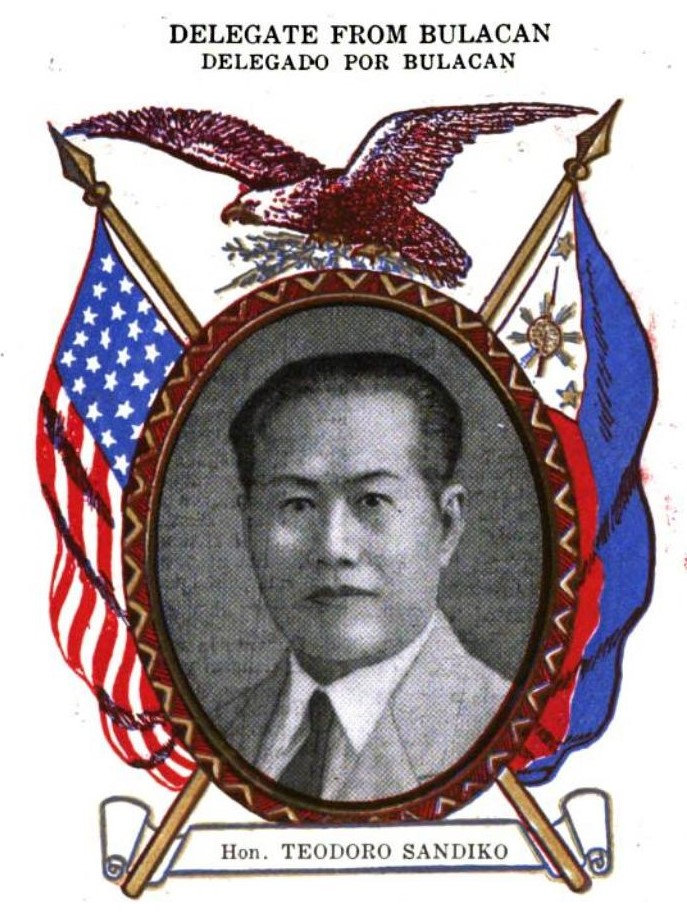
- Sandiko as a delegate to the Philippine Constitutional Convention, published by Benipayo Press (c. 1935)

Senator of the Philippines from the 3rd Senatorial District
- In office June 3, 1919 – June 2, 1931 Serving with Ceferino de Leon (1919–1922), Santiago Lucero (1922–1925), Luis Morales (1925–1928), Benigno S. Aquino (1928–1931)
- Preceded by: Isauro Gabaldón
- Succeeded by: Sotero Baluyut

5th Governor of Bulacan
- In office 1906–1909
- Preceded by: Pablo Tecson
- Succeeded by: Donato Teodoro

Minister of the Interior
- In office January 21, 1899 – May 7, 1899
- President: Emilio Aguinaldo
- Preceded by: Leandro Ibarra
- Succeeded by: Severino de las Alas

Member of the Malolos Congress from Misamis
- In office September 15, 1898 – November 13, 1899 Serving with Apolonio Mercado and Gracio Gonzaga

Personal details
- Born: Teodoro Sandiko y Santa Ana; March 31, 1860 Pandacan, Manila, Captaincy General of the Philippines
- Died: October 19, 1939 (aged 79) San Juan, Rizal, Commonwealth of the Philippines
- Party: Democrata (1914–1935); Nacionalista (1907–1914); Independent (1898–1907)
- Spouse(s): Mercedes Tiongson Sandiko; Gregoria Morales Sandiko
- Children: 3
- Education: University of Santo Tomas (BA)
- Profession: Lawyer

Teodoro Sandiko y Santa Ana (March 31, 1860 – October 19, 1939) was a Filipino lawyer and former senator of the Philippines. Sandiko played important roles in Philippine history when he held various posts in the Aguinaldo cabinet. After the revolution, he went through different positions in local government of Bulacan until he was elected to Philippine Senate in 1919.

== Biography ==
Sandiko was born in Pandacan, Manila on March 31, 1860 to Miguel Sandiko and María Paz de Santa Ana and was educated and finished Bachelor of Arts at the University of Santo Tomas. He also took two years of law but he didn't finish it, instead, he opened a Latin grammar school in Malolos.

His radical nationalist ideas irritated the colonial Spanish officials so he sailed to Hong Kong and then to mainland Spain where he continued his law school at the University of Madrid. He was not able to finish his course because he joined the Propaganda Movement in Spain. He managed La Solidaridad on February 15, 1889.

When the truce of Biak-na-Bato failed, he joined the return to the Philippines with exiles in Hong Kong. In the Philippines, he held several positions in the revolutionary republic's Aguinaldo cabinet: Minister of Foreign Affairs, Colonel of the General State, and a brigadier-general of the army.

When the Americans obtained Philippines after the Spanish–American War, Sandiko became an employee of the Office of the Provost Marshal General. While being employed to the Americans, he cabled secret and valuable information to Aguinaldo government. Sandiko was the alleged author of "Sandiko order", an infamous military instruction in 1899 by him as a general of the Aguinaldo, instructing Filipino soldiers inside American-occupied Manila to rise an insurrection against to United States rule and kill all whites in the city. The "Sandiko order" was actually an American propaganda to search for Filipino savagery against American sovereignty over the islands and as a casus belli to declare war against insurrection. In 1900 US elections, Theodore Roosevelt used this document to his vice presidential candidacy as further justification to American occupation of the Philippines.

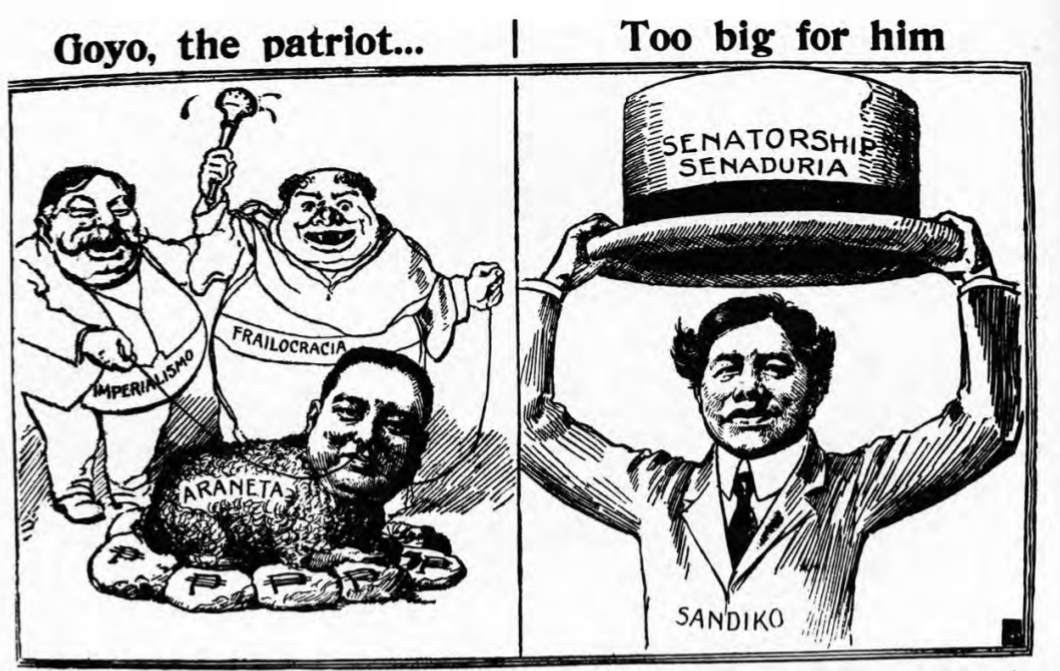
Cartoon by The Independent mocking Gregorio Araneta (left) being an ally of Teodoro Sandiko (right) for the 1916 senatorial election, published September 16, 1916

Before the Philippine–American War erupted in June 1899, he resigned from office and became Aguinaldo's Minister of the Interior.

After the assimilation of Philippine islands, he entered politics and was elected as the governor of Bulacan in 1906. He remained in office until 1909. In 1914, Nacionalista Party's left wing under the leadership of Sandiko bolted out of the party and established Partido Democrata Nacional or the Democratas. In 1920, he became spokesperson of Kapatiran Magsasaka.

From 1919–1931, he served as a Senator to the 5th, 6th, 7th and 8th Philippine Legislatures representing the third senatorial district (present-day Bulacan, Nueva Ecija, Pampanga and Tarlac). In 1934, he was elected as the Second Vice President of the House of Representatives of the Philippines and was a delegate to the 1934–1935 Constitutional Convention for the drafting of the 1935 Constitution.

After retiring from public service, he became the manager of Katubusan and La Paz y Buen Viaje cigar factories. Sandiko died of a heart attack on October 19, 1939.
