= 1957 Philippine general election =

- November 12, 1957
- Presidential election
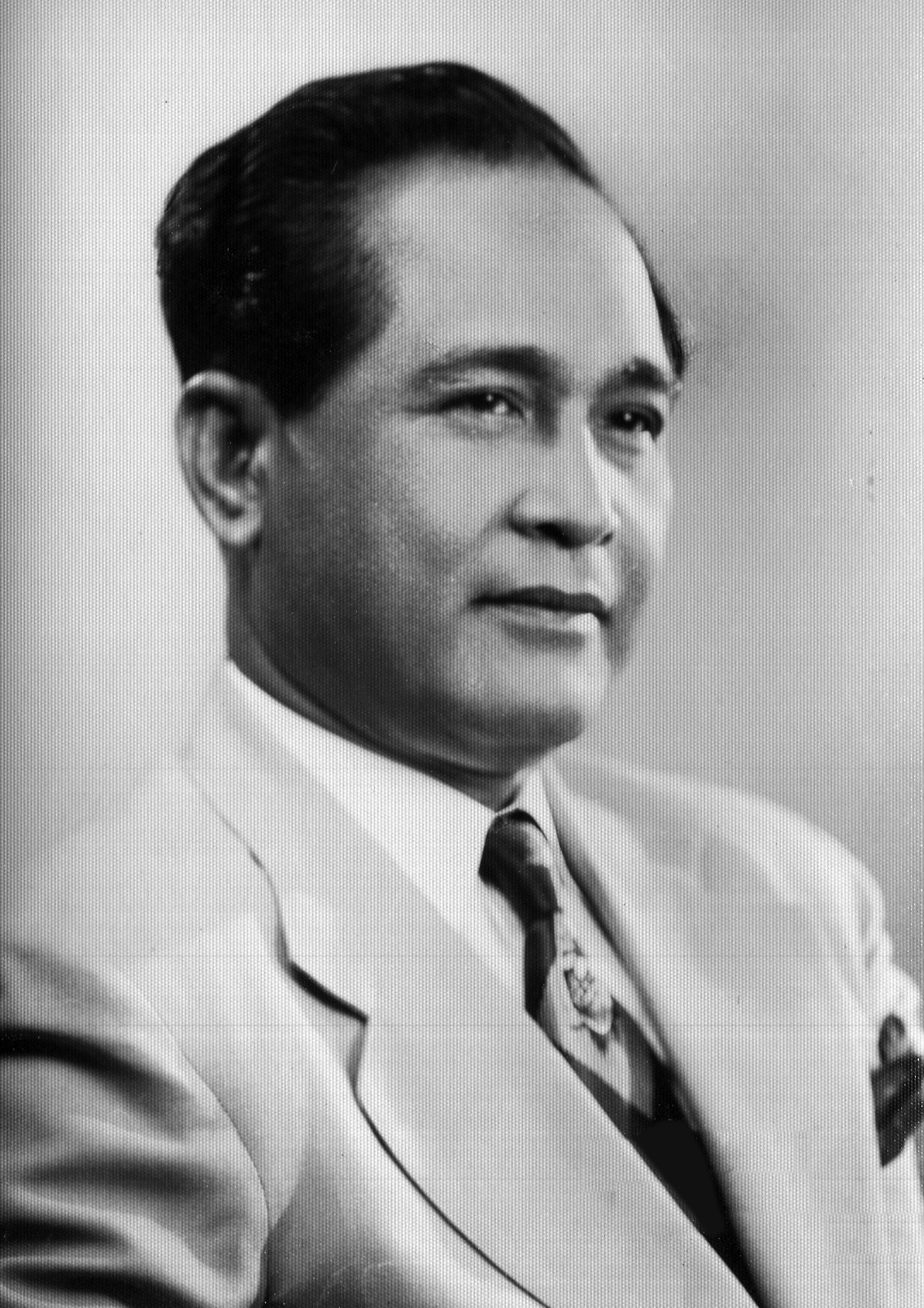

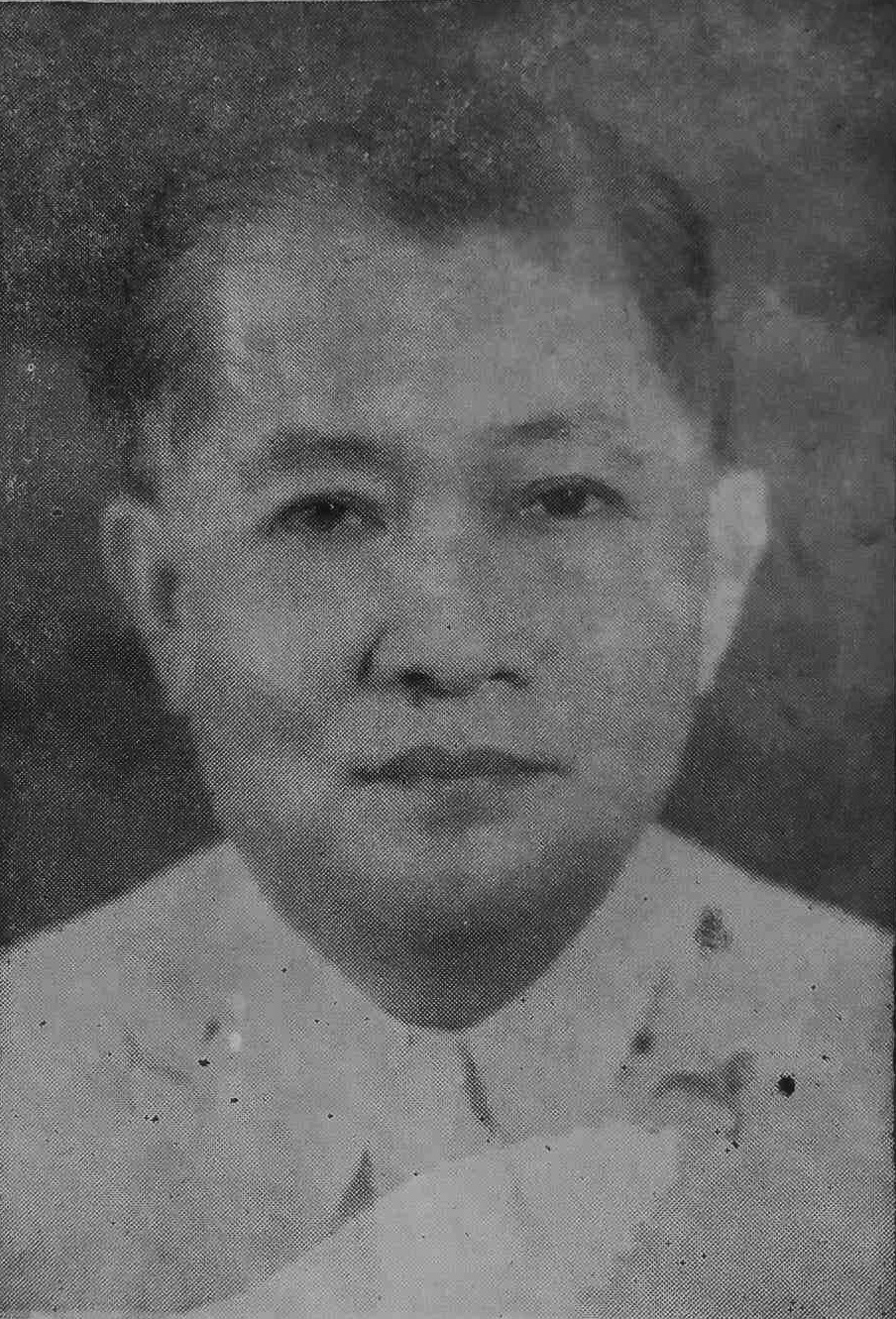

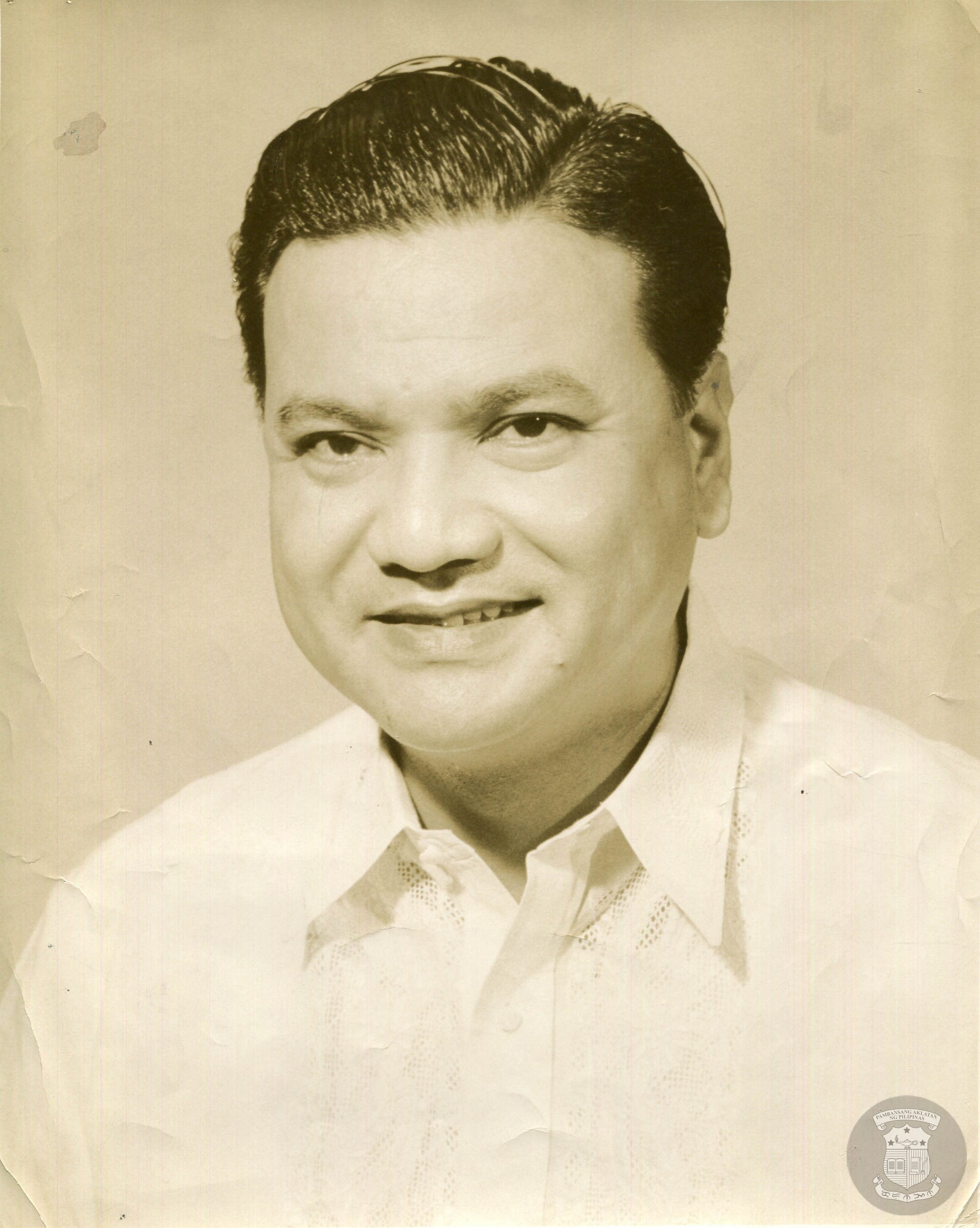

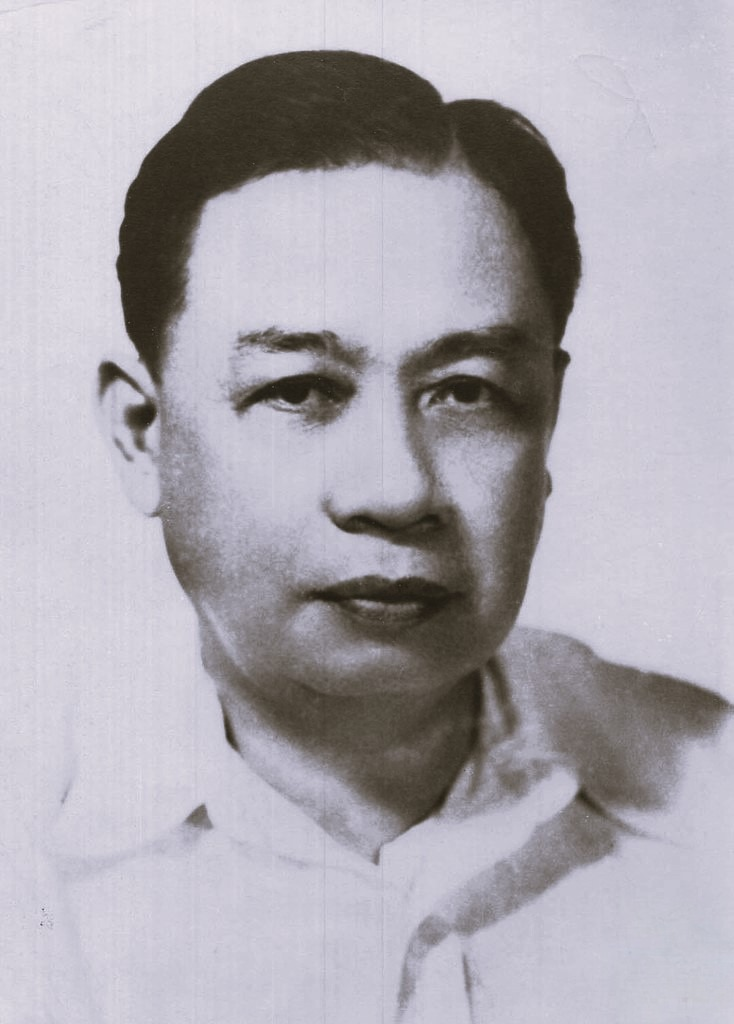
Nominee	Carlos P. Garcia	José Yulo
Party	Nacionalista	Liberal
Running mate	Jose Laurel Jr.	Diosdado Macapagal
Popular vote	2,072,257	1,386,829
Percentage	41.28%	27.62%
Nominee	Manuel Manahan	Claro M. Recto
Party	Progressive	NCP
Running mate	Vicente Araneta	Lorenzo Tañada
Popular vote	1,049,420	429,226
Percentage	20.90%	8.55%
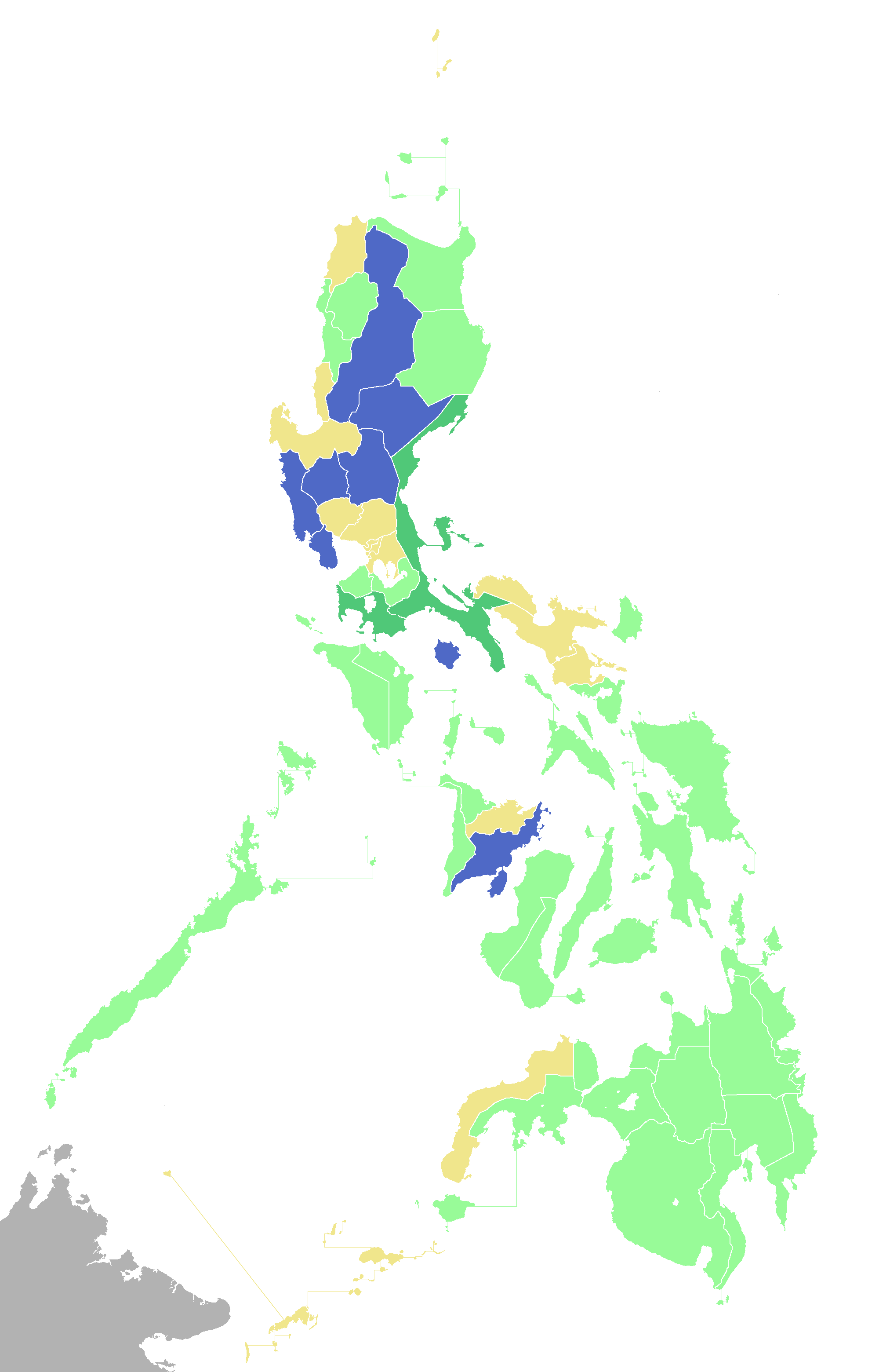
President before election
Carlos P. Garcia
Nacionalista
Elected President
Carlos P. Garcia
Nacionalista
- Vice presidential election
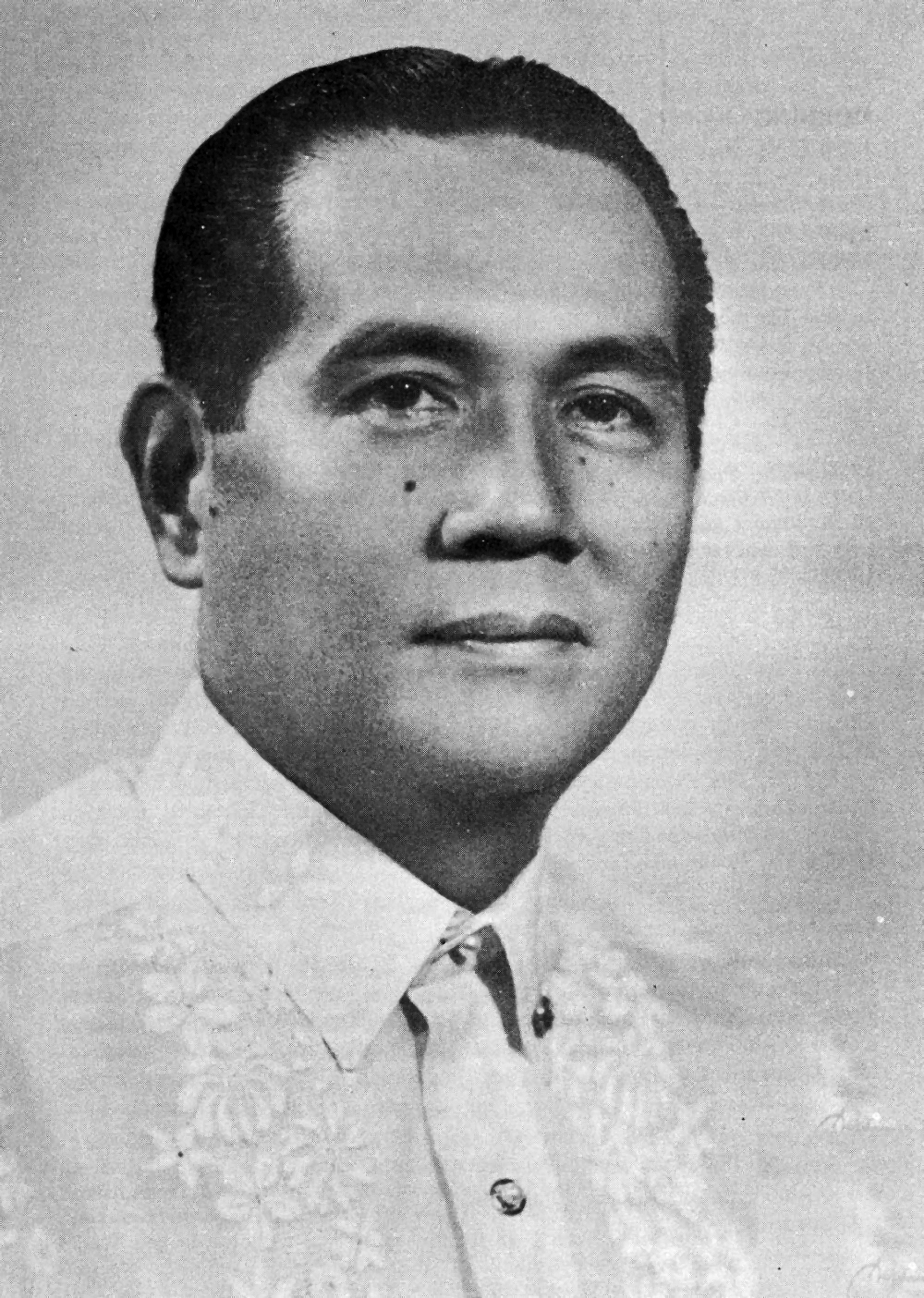

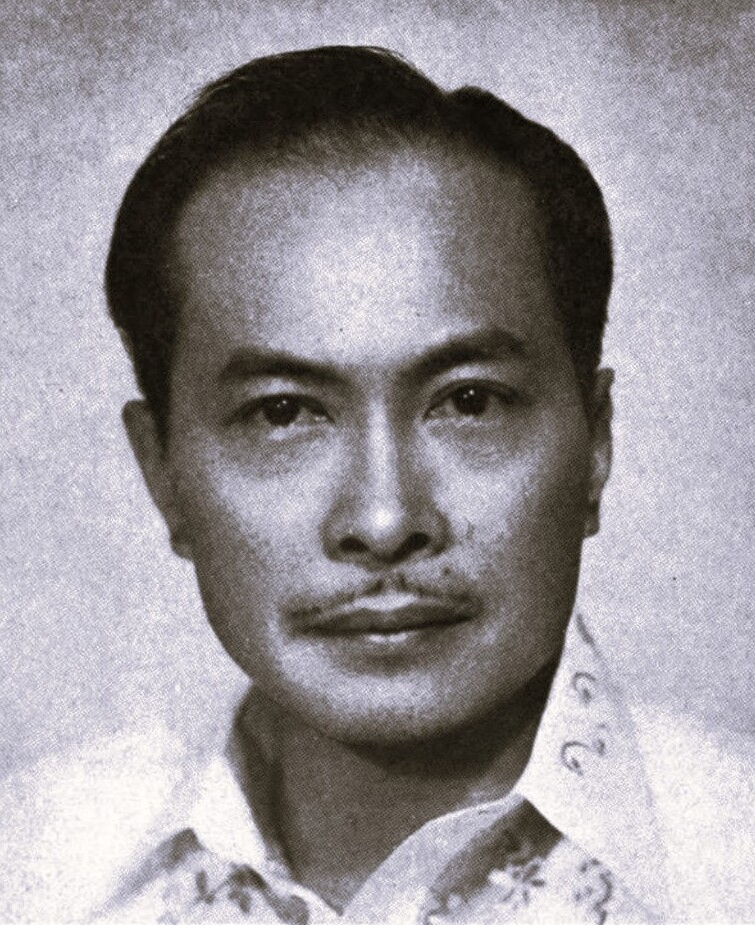

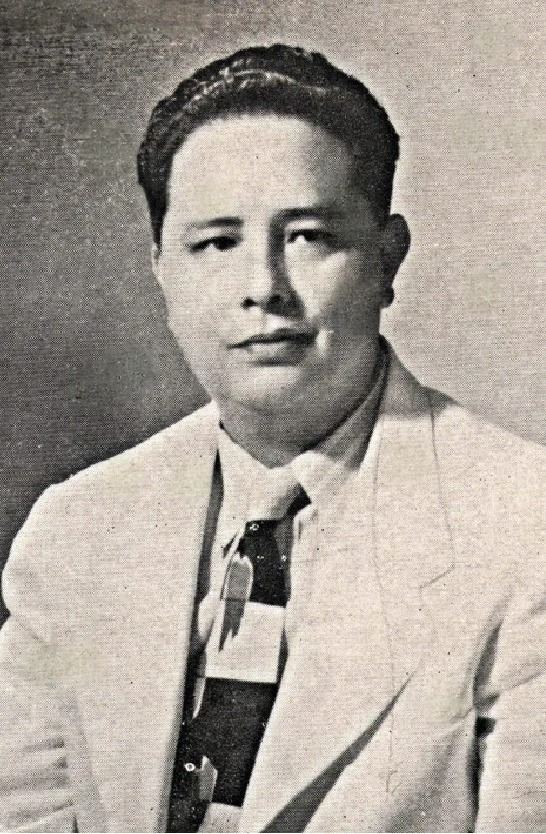

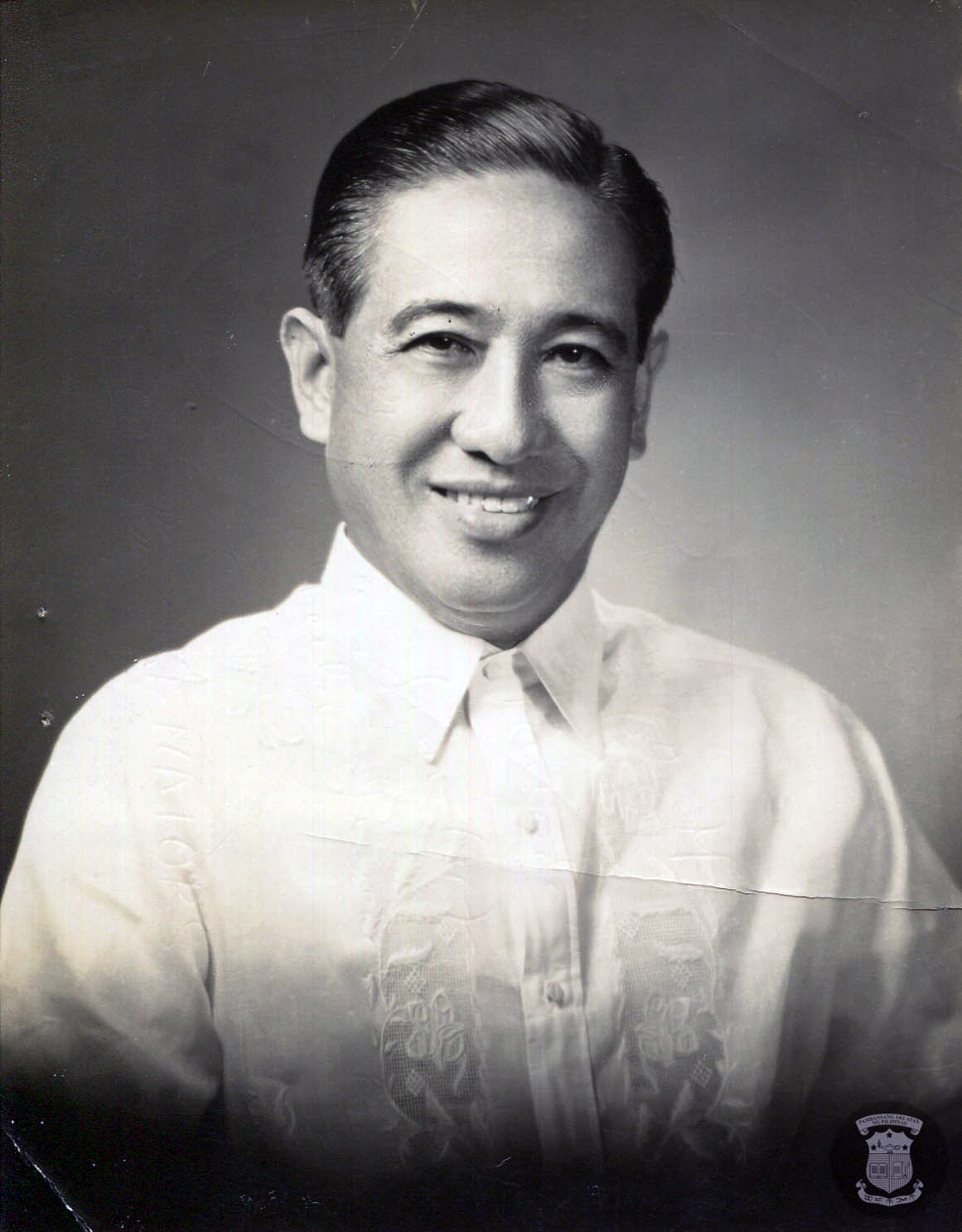
Candidate	Diosdado Macapagal	Jose Laurel Jr.
Party	Liberal	Nacionalista
Popular vote	2,189,197	1,783,012
Percentage	46.55%	37.92%
Nominee	Vicente Araneta	Lorenzo Tañada
Party	Progressive	NCP
Popular vote	375,090	344,685
Percentage	7.98%	7.33%
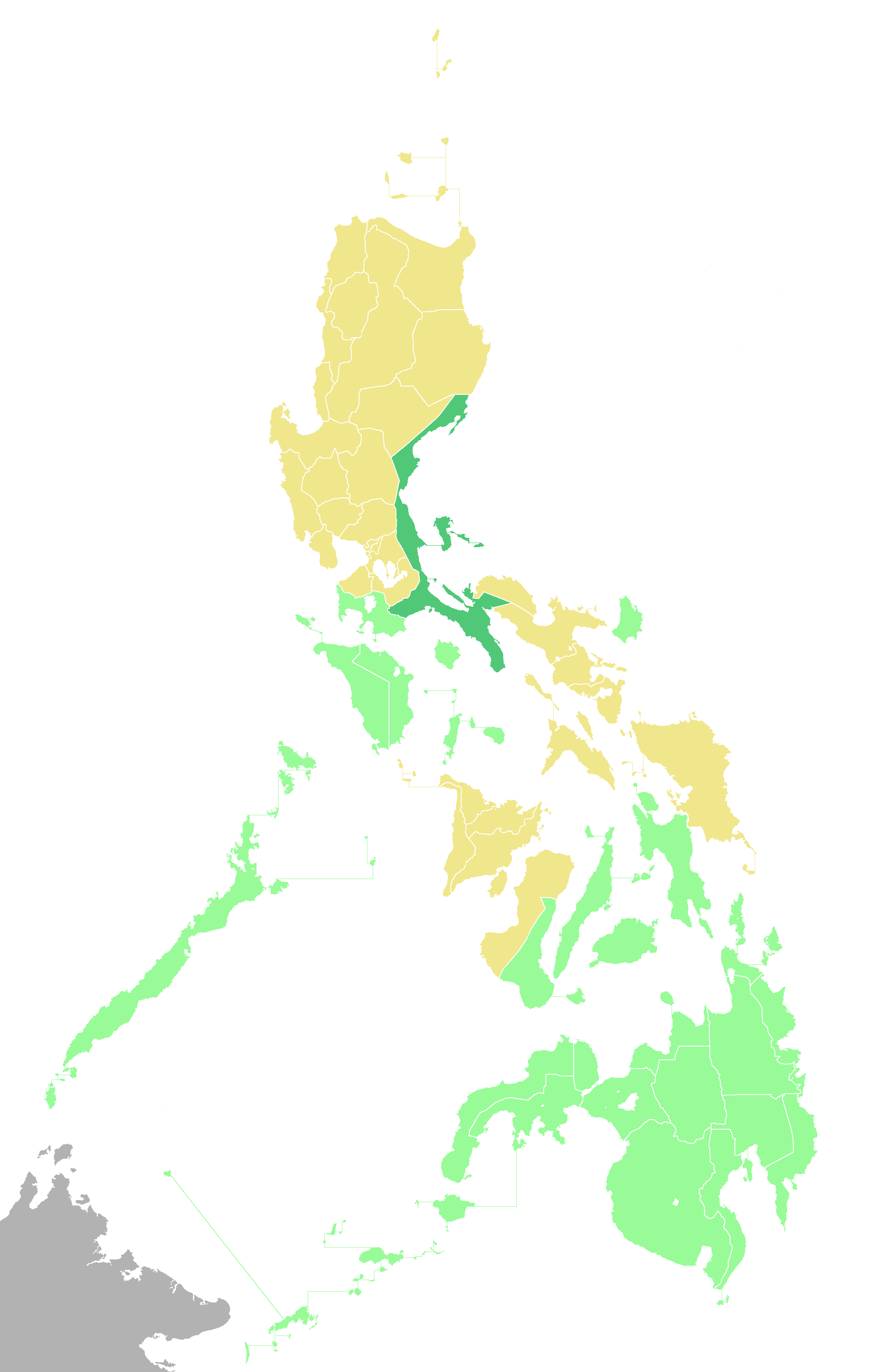
Vice President before election
Vacant
Elected Vice President
Diosdado Macapagal
Liberal
- Senate election

8 of the 24 seats in the Philippine Senate 13 needs for a majority
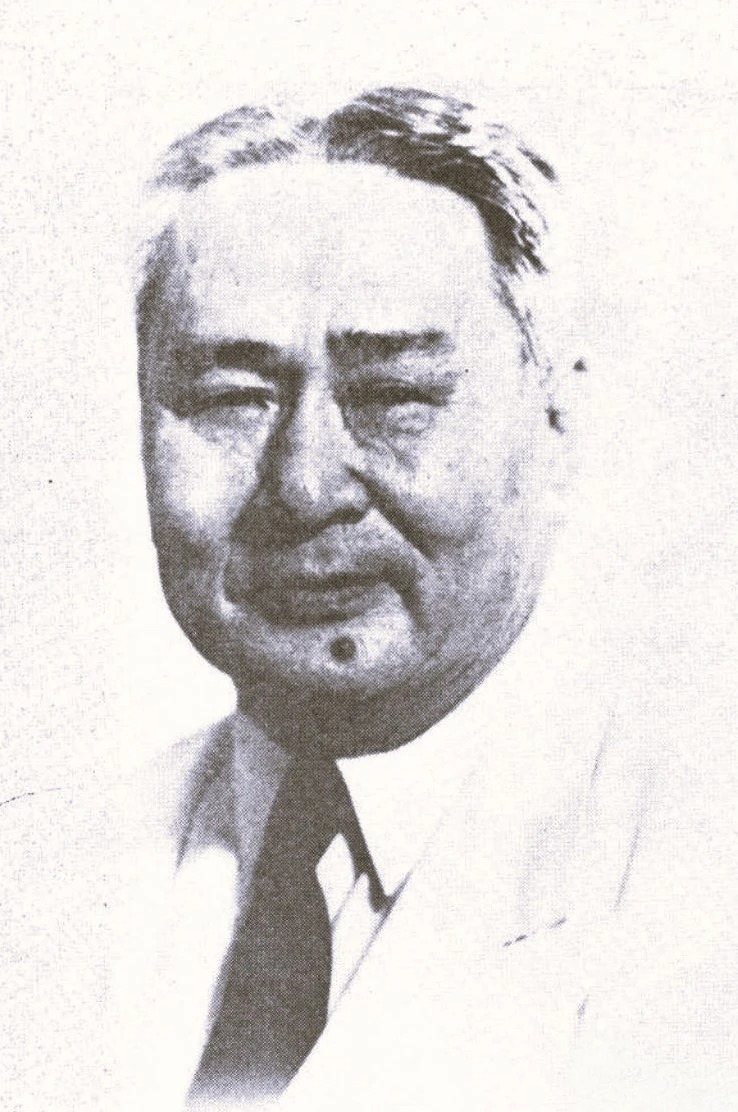

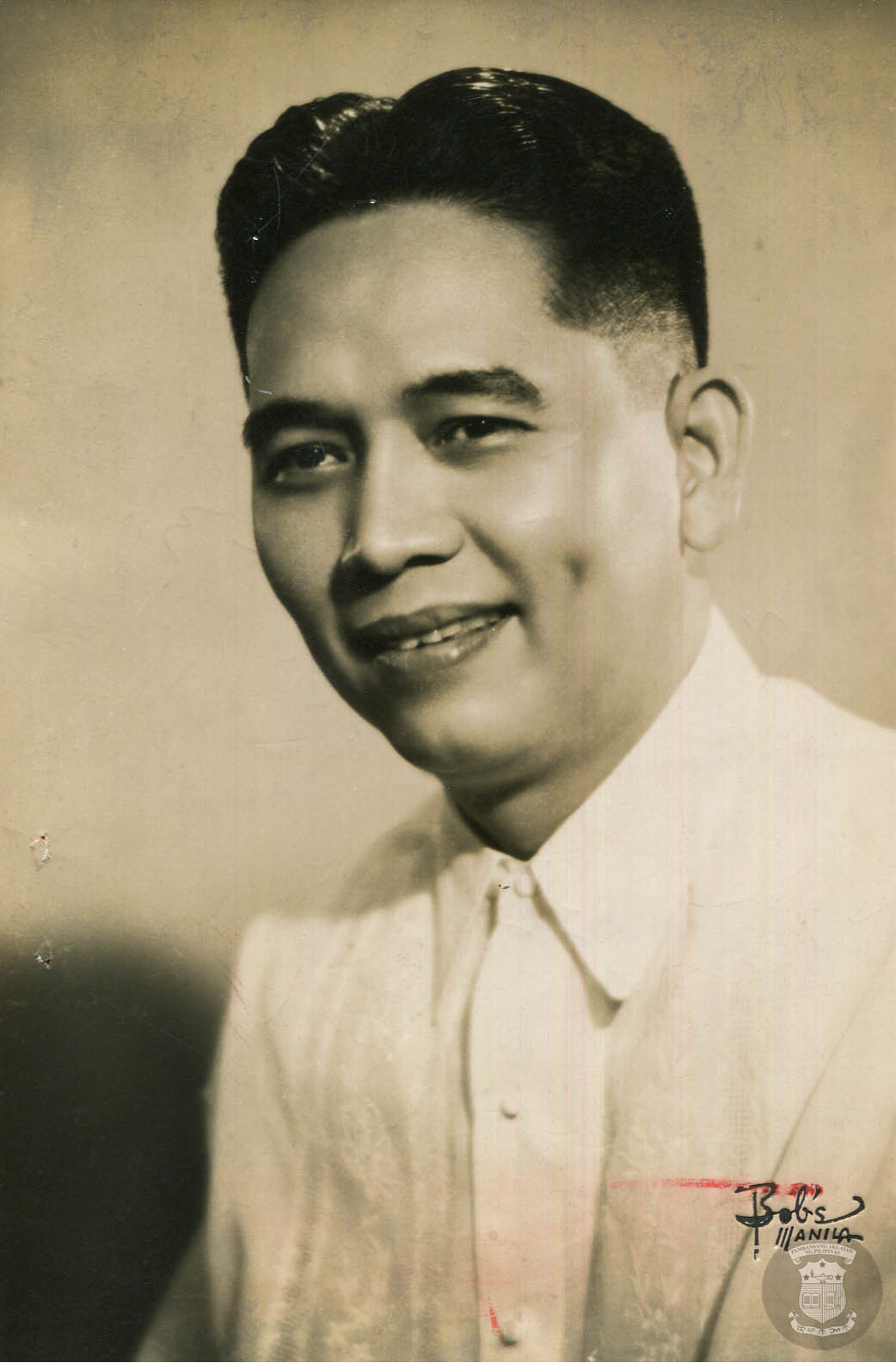

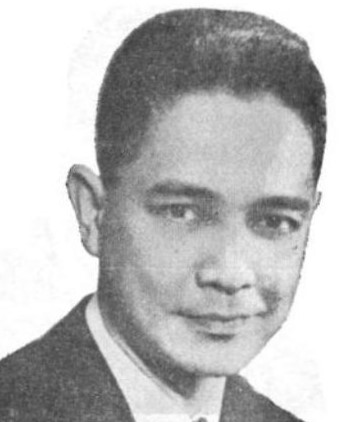

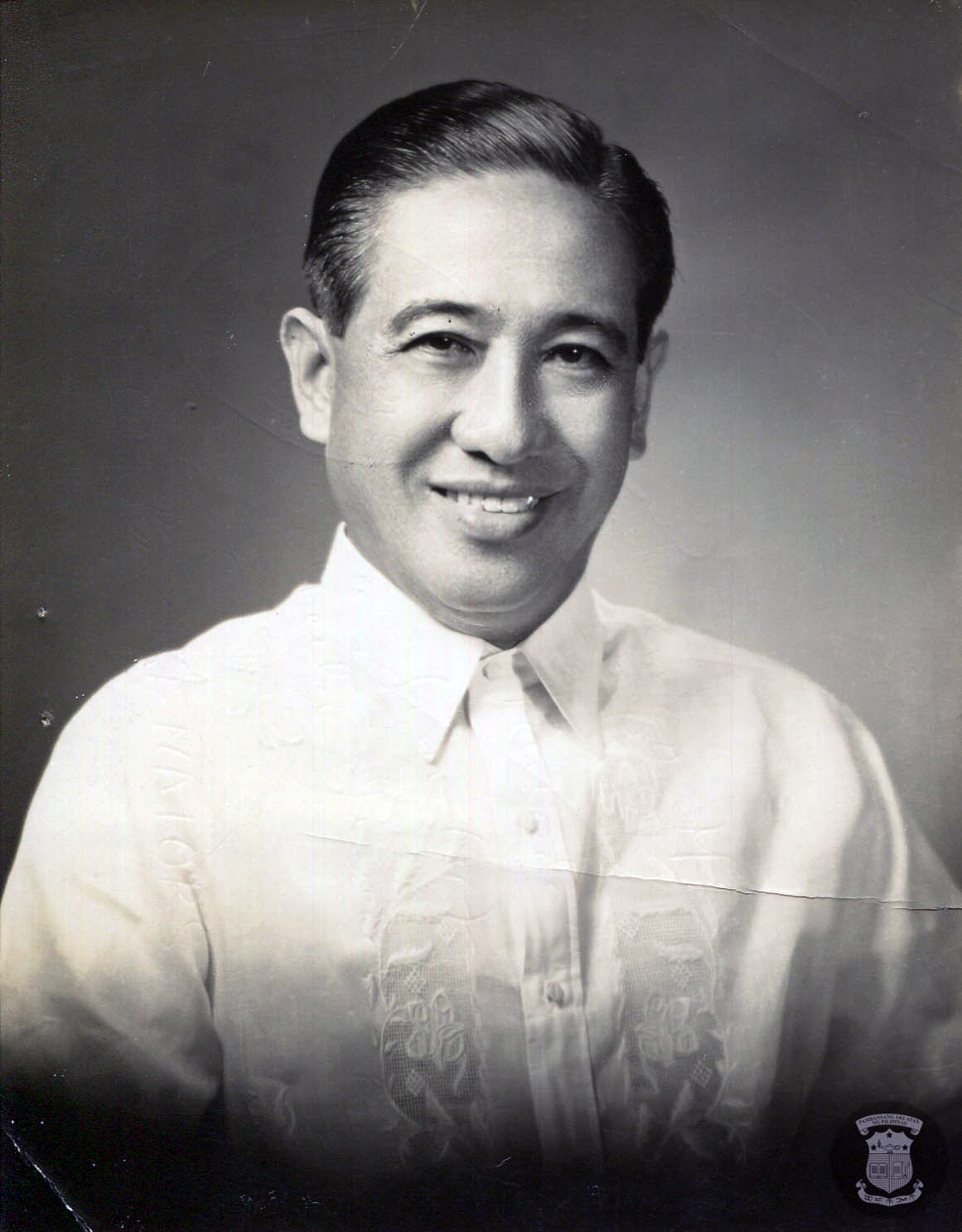

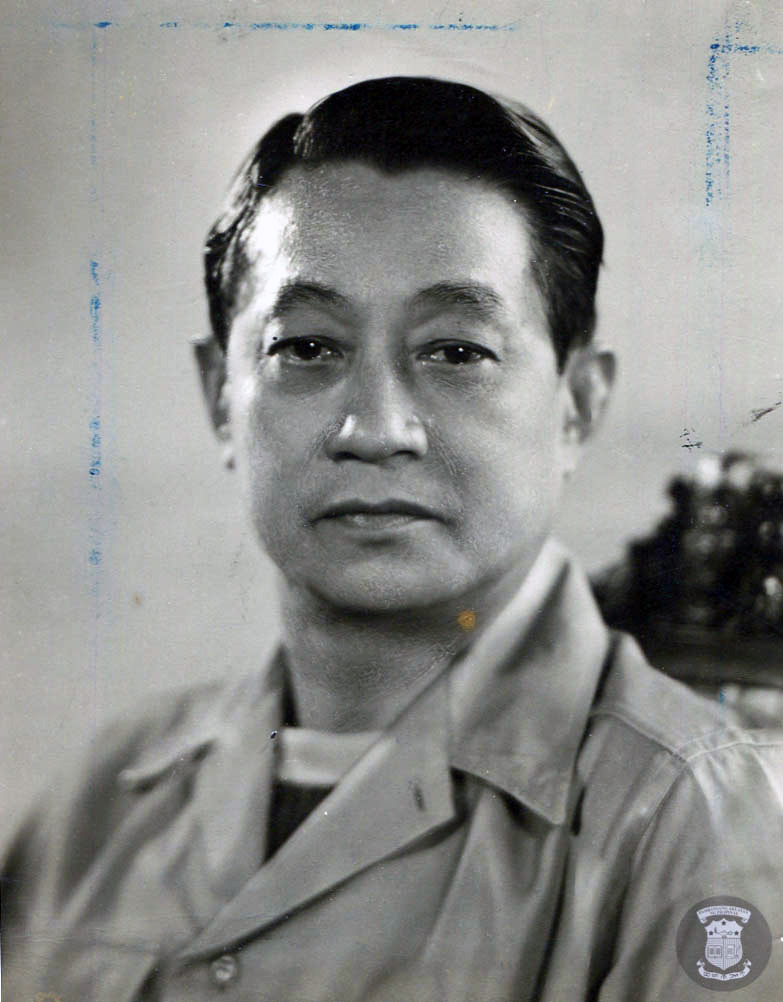
	First party	Second party	Third party
Leader	Eulogio Rodriguez	Ambrosio Padilla	Raul Manglapus (lost)
Party	Nacionalista	Liberal	Progressive
Seats before	20 (6 up)	0	0
Seats won	6	2	0
Seats after	20	2	0
Seat change	Steady	▲2	Steady
Popular vote	13,271,831	8,898,218	3,393,935
Percentage	47.28	31.70	12.09
Swing	▼19.90	▼1.01	▲12.09
	Fourth party	Fifth party
Leader	Lorenzo Tañada	Jose Zulueta
Party	NCP	PVDMGG
Seats before	2 (0 up)	1 (up)
Seats won	0	0
Seats after	2	0
Seat change	Steady	▼1
Popular vote	1,949,972	346,585
Percentage	6.95	1.23
Swing	▲6.95	▲1.23
Senate President before election
Eulogio Rodriguez
Nacionalista
Elected Senate President
Eulogio Rodriguez
Nacionalista
- House elections

All 102 seats in the House of Representatives of the Philippines 52 seats needed for a majority
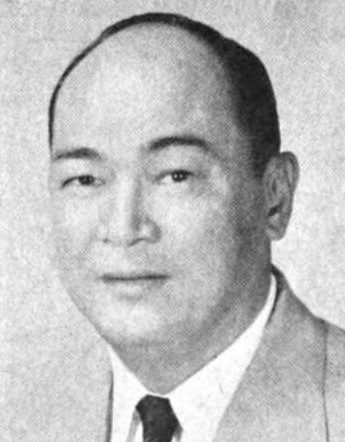

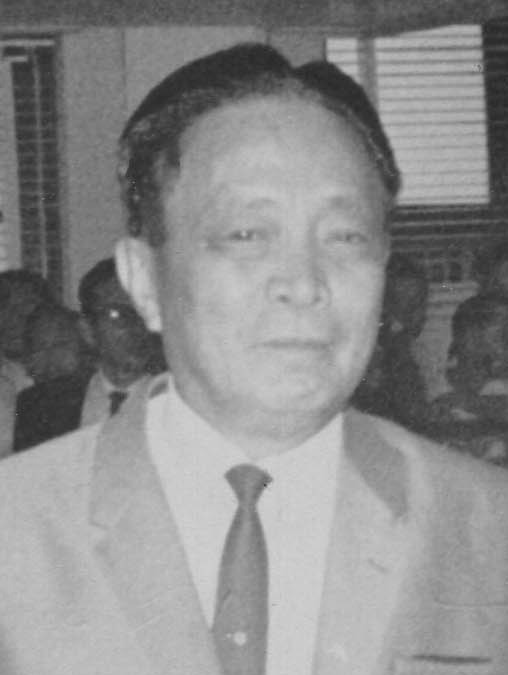
	Majority party	Minority party
Leader	Daniel Romualdez	Cornelio Villareal
Party	Nacionalista	Liberal
Leader's seat	Leyte–4th	Capiz–2nd
Last election	31 seats, 47.30%	59 seats, 39.81%
Seats won	82	19
Seat change	▲51	▼40
Popular vote	2,948,409	1,453,527
Percentage	61.19	30.17
Swing	▲13.89	▼9.64
Speaker before election
José Laurel, Jr.
Nacionalista
Elected Speaker
Daniel Romualdez
Nacionalista

Presidential, legislative and local elections were held in the Philippines on November 12, 1957. Incumbent President Carlos P. Garcia won his opportunity to get a full term as President of the Philippines after the death of late President Ramon Magsaysay in a plane crash in March 1957. His running mate, Batangas Representative Jose Laurel, Jr. lost to Pampanga Representative Diosdado Macapagal. This was the first time in Philippine electoral history where a president was elected by a plurality and not majority, and in which the president and vice president came from different parties.

== Results ==
=== President ===
Candidate	Party	Votes	%
Carlos P. Garcia (incumbent)	Nacionalista Party	2,072,257	41.28
José Yulo	Liberal Party	1,386,829	27.62
Manuel Manahan	Progressive Party	1,049,420	20.90
Claro M. Recto	Nationalist Citizens' Party	429,226	8.55
Antonio Quirino	Liberal Party (Quirino wing) (Note: Quirino ran under his own wing of the Liberal Party, while the rest of the party supported Yulo's candidacy.)	60,328	1.20
Valentin de los Santos	Lapiang Malaya	21,674	0.43
Alfredo Abcede	Federal Party	470	0.01
Total		5,020,204	100.00
Valid votes		5,020,204	98.28
Invalid/blank votes		87,908	1.72
Total votes		5,108,112	100.00
Registered voters/turnout		6,763,897	75.52
Source: Nohlen, Grotz, Hartmann, Hasall and Santos

=== Vice president ===
Candidate	Party	Votes	%
Diosdado Macapagal	Liberal Party	2,189,197	46.55
Jose Laurel Jr.	Nacionalista Party	1,783,012	37.92
Vicente Araneta	Progressive Party	375,090	7.98
Lorenzo Tañada	Nationalist Citizens' Party	344,685	7.33
Restituto Fresto	Lapiang Malaya	10,494	0.22
Total		4,702,478	100.00
Valid votes		4,702,478	92.06
Invalid/blank votes		405,634	7.94
Total votes		5,108,112	100.00
Registered voters/turnout		6,763,897	75.52
Source: Nohlen, Grotz, Hartmann, Hasall and Santos

=== Senate ===
Representation of results; seats contested are inside the box. Nacionalista Party Liberal Party Democratic Party Nationalist Citizens' Party

Candidate	Party	Votes	%
Gil Puyat	Nacionalista Party	2,189,909	42.87
Arturo Tolentino	Nacionalista Party	1,982,708	38.81
Eulogio Balao	Nacionalista Party	1,851,157	36.24
Rogelio de la Rosa	Liberal Party	1,715,123	33.58
Oscar Ledesma	Nacionalista Party	1,670,774	32.71
Ambrosio Padilla	Liberal Party	1,636,202	32.03
Roseller T. Lim	Nacionalista Party	1,558,322	30.51
Cipriano Primicias Sr.	Nacionalista Party	1,350,868	26.45
Jose Locsin	Nacionalista Party	1,347,797	26.39
Francisco Afan Delgado	Nacionalista Party	1,320,296	25.85
Osmundo Mondoñedo	Liberal Party	1,011,053	19.79
Raul Manglapus	Progressive Party	1,005,595	19.69
Narciso Pimentel Jr.	Liberal Party	1,004,944	19.67
Estanislao Fernandez	Liberal Party	997,562	19.53
Juan Liwag	Liberal Party	918,785	17.99
Consuelo Salazar-Perez	Liberal Party	844,950	16.54
Marcos Calo	Liberal Party	769,599	15.07
Pacita de los Reyes-Phillips	Nationalist Citizens' Party	641,716	12.56
Terry Adevoso	Progressive Party	562,491	11.01
Josefa Gonzales-Estrada	Progressive Party	423,319	8.29
Antonio Maceda	Nationalist Citizens' Party	383,531	7.51
Jaime Ferrer	Progressive Party	345,881	6.77
Jose M. Hernandez	Progressive Party	339,909	6.65
Fulvio Pelaez	Progressive Party	313,221	6.13
Mario Bengzon	Nationalist Citizens' Party	265,859	5.20
Jose Zulueta	People's (Veterans) Democratic Movement for Good Government	213,465	4.18
Norberto Romualdez Jr.	Progressive Party	210,822	4.13
Rodrigo Perez Jr.	Progressive Party	192,697	3.77
Cipriano Cid	Nationalist Citizens' Party	162,493	3.18
Emilio Javier	Nationalist Citizens' Party	155,867	3.05
Vicente Llanes	Nationalist Citizens' Party	124,744	2.44
Manuel Abella	Nationalist Citizens' Party	116,509	2.28
Gonzalo Vasquez	Nationalist Citizens' Party	99,253	1.94
Severino Luna	Independent	59,690	1.17
Remedios Magsaysay	Independent	59,000	1.16
Atilano Cinco	People's (Veterans) Democratic Movement for Good Government	48,863	0.96
Vicente Rafael	People's (Veterans) Democratic Movement for Good Government	47,883	0.94
Miguel Pendon	People's (Veterans) Democratic Movement for Good Government	24,458	0.48
Felicidad Villanueva	Women's Party	14,725	0.29
Antonia Lumibao	People's (Veterans) Democratic Movement for Good Government	11,916	0.23
Dominador Portugal	Lapiang Malaya	8,915	0.17
Eulogio Duyan	Lapiang Malaya	8,434	0.17
Romualdo Saclayan	Lapiang Malaya	8,235	0.16
Deogracias Pedrosa	Lapiang Malaya	7,919	0.16
Jose Villanueva	Lapiang Malaya	7,805	0.15
Luis de Guzman	Lapiang Malaya	7,781	0.15
Emmanuel Rey	Lapiang Malaya	7,123	0.14
Teofilo Ramas	Lapiang Malaya	6,470	0.13
Jose Canuto	Independent	6,147	0.12
Arturo Samaniego	Liberal Party (Quirino wing) (Note: The supporters of Antonio Quirino in the Liberal Party ran candidates under the Quirino wing of that party.)	2,515	0.05
Ciriaco de las Liagas	Independent	2,427	0.05
Patricio Ceniza	Independent	2,119	0.04
Gregorio Llanza	Independent	1,333	0.03
Consuelo Fa Alvear	Independent	1,135	0.02
Total		28,072,314	100.00
Total votes		5,108,112	–
Registered voters/turnout		6,763,897	75.52

=== House of Representatives ===
Party	Votes	%	+/–	Seats	+/–
Nacionalista Party	2,948,409	61.19	+13.89	82	+51
Liberal Party	1,453,527	30.17	−9.64	19	−40
Nationalist Citizens' Party	137,093	2.85	New	1	New
Progressive Party	62,968	1.31	New	0	0
Nacionalista Party (independent)	51,729	1.07	+0.04	0	0
Democratic Party	42,890	0.89	−6.07	0	−9
United Rural Community	3,296	0.07	New	0	0
Liberal Party (independent)	2,802	0.06	−0.58	0	0
Lapiang Makabansa	1,765	0.04	New	0	0
People's (Veterans) Democratic Movement for Good Government	968	0.02	New	0	0
Partido'y Makahirap	524	0.01	New	0	0
National Patriotic Party	12	0.00	New	0	0
Independent	112,537	2.34	−0.38	0	−1
Total	4,818,520	100.00	–	102	0
Valid votes	4,818,520	94.33	−0.00		
Invalid/blank votes	289,562	5.67	+0.00		
Total votes	5,108,082	100.00	–		
Registered voters/turnout	6,763,897	75.52	−1.70		
Source: Nohlen, Grotz and Hartmann and Teehankee

== See also ==
- Commission on Elections
- Politics of the Philippines
- Philippine elections
- President of the Philippines
- 4th Congress of the Philippines
