= Congressional canvass for the 1957 Philippine presidential election =

The following is the official canvassing of votes by the Congress of the Philippines for the 1957 Philippine presidential election.

== Presidential election ==
Candidate	Party	Votes	%
Carlos P. Garcia	Nacionalista Party	2,072,257	41.28
José Yulo	Liberal Party	1,386,829	27.62
Manuel Manahan	Progressive Party	1,049,420	20.90
Claro M. Recto	Nationalist Citizens' Party	429,226	8.55
Antonio Quirino	Liberal Party (Quirino wing) (Note: Quirino ran under his own wing of the Liberal Party, while the rest of the party supported Yulo's candidacy.)	60,328	1.20
Valentin de los Santos	Lapiang Malaya	21,674	0.43
Alfredo Abcede	Federal Party	470	0.01
Total		5,020,204	100.00
Valid votes		5,020,204	98.28
Invalid/blank votes		87,908	1.72
Total votes		5,108,112	100.00
Registered voters/turnout		6,763,897	75.52
Source: Nohlen, Grotz, Hartmann, Hasall and Santos

Province/City	Garcia	Yulo	Manahan	Recto	Quirino	de los Santos	Abcede
Abra	11,051	6,034	8,681	386	1,598	0	0
Agusan	22,827	9,280	5,765	924	6	0	0
Aklan	20,323	20,092	8,986	466	13	22	0
Albay	27,108	30,862	27,582	2,051	50	40	122
Antique	21,966	16,215	4,626	692	25	646	0
Bacolod City	7,034	8,612	7,373	1,442	3	0	0
Baguio	2,170	4,559	2,694	580	658	2	1
Bataan	10,987	7,702	16,092	4,320	410	0	0
Batanes	1,268	819	1,145	39	3	17	0
Batangas	32,456	10,252	4,496	111,729	827	3,500	14
Bohol	98,057	30,274	263	119	8	0	0
Bukidnon	10,930	3,162	4,100	436	32	0	5
Bulacan	41,202	53,492	40,410	17,346	1,189	750	13
Butuan	12,858	4,750	3,906	518	18	0	1
Cabanatuan	3,082	2,876	4,151	1,501	55	0	0
Cagayan	29,736	12,634	19,953	1,813	3,529	0	0
Cagayan de Oro	5,833	1,047	4,001	1,863	101	1	0
Calbayog	8,543	6,160	29	30	5	0	0
Camarines Norte	10,317	11,480	11,003	2,885	59	113	0
Camarines Sur	34,630	42,269	30,364	5,409	350	0	0
Capiz	21,201	26,066	7,834	445	25	0	8
Catanduanes	11,585	9,694	5,527	202	2	3	0
Cavite	34,169	20,077	11,175	19,548	1,216	1,241	2
Cavite City	2,269	4,201	1,995	2,465	139	0	0
Cebu	186,088	27,896	47,509	7,087	26	0	0
Cebu City	22,485	9,908	11,904	1,260	14	0	0
Cotabato	62,343	26,335	21,980	3,320	914	0	0
Dagupan	6,513	7,843	1,855	313	43	0	0
Davao	64,552	11,083	9,053	2,107	183	0	0
Davao City	28,708	6,408	4,158	4,101	352	0	0
Dumaguete	3,686	2,014	1,263	239	1	0	0
Iligan City	6,906	1,931	1,478	241	4	0	0
Ilocos Norte	22,563	29,870	13,406	1,591	748	83	0
Ilocos Sur	23,398	19,986	20,138	2,162	19,026	28	3
Iloilo	60,319	53,627	64,249	4,049	27	0	0
Iloilo City	13,203	10,017	14,310	1,163	9	0	0
Isabela	20,039	12,010	17,895	2,354	1,063	1,156	19
La Union	14,951	23,542	20,173	732	5,130	0	0
Laguna	20,185	31,547	28,217	19,032	2,370	0	0
Lanao	40,119	20,797	3,930	392	19	0	0
Leyte	119,067	63,771	10,883	2,113	45	310	8
Manila	61,274	72,606	61,652	35,352	4,463	0	0
Marawi City	3,880	2,345	266	11	5	0	0
Marinduque	7,776	3,380	11,336	4,302	41	41	0
Masbate	20,581	10,989	18,666	1,149	6	3	4
Misamis Occidental	24,964	11,811	2,929	878	7	0	0
Misamis Oriental	33,150	4,000	11,105	3,560	25	0	0
Mountain Province	12,521	13,696	24,619	1,260	443	0	0
Naga City	2,301	2,629	2,854	924	92	7	2
Negros Occidental	73,312	51,511	25,348	4,321	14	0	0
Negros Oriental	45,263	24,841	7,790	520	6	0	7
Nueva Ecija	30,252	25,716	35,149	10,792	1,557	2,871	4
Nueva Vizcaya	6,442	3,599	11,129	604	320	0	0
Occidental Mindoro	8,077	5,669	1,663	1,926	146	8	0
Oriental Mindoro	14,008	7,269	8,010	12,680	154	0	0
Ormoc City	8,539	2,935	267	223	1	4	0
Ozamiz City	6,524	1,072	1,440	475	0	0	0
Palawan	13,568	9,056	2,870	380	12	0	0
Pampanga	17,560	58,091	34,904	11,474	561	504	0
Pangasinan	94,705	102,702	54,656	2,530	1,192	3,621	77
Pasay City	7,164	9,172	6,548	3,914	386	226	4
Quezon	24,336	14,943	28,296	51,048	352	3,157	62
Quezon City	15,736	14,701	9,162	6,088	832	378	3
Rizal	52,244	59,042	50,604	25,140	3,541	1,951	27
Romblon	13,755	12,300	208	142	1	0	0
Roxas City	4,061	6,057	1,260	193	45	0	0
Samar	62,637	49,066	10,577	1,024	38	0	0
San Pablo City	2,780	2,678	4,823	6,555	925	0	0
Silay City	4,461	972	4,295	73	0	0	0
Sorsogon	28,837	24,464	16,522	607	57	72	29
Sulu	11,415	14,743	3,048	587	8	0	0
Surigao	49,475	11,872	6,820	1,919	7	0	0
Tacloban City	6,731	3,856	972	321	8	0	0
Tagaytay City	1,333	148	89	124	6	1	0
Tarlac	22,360	19,516	32,214	3,987	4,511	312	54
Trece Martires City	198	28	51	32	0	0	0
Zambales	16,820	9,376	19,470	2,301	153	603	0
Zamboanga del Norte	26,564	5,299	2,856	537	21	3	1
Zamboanga del Sur	39,926	13,485	10,400	1,808	117	0	0
Total	2,072,257	1,386,829	1,049,420	429,226	60,328	21,674	470
Province/City							
Province/City	Garcia	Yulo	Manahan	Recto	Quirino	Santos	Abcede

== Vice presidential election ==
Candidate	Party	Votes	%
Diosdado Macapagal	Liberal Party	2,189,197	46.55
Jose Laurel Jr.	Nacionalista Party	1,783,012	37.92
Vicente Araneta	Progressive Party	375,090	7.98
Lorenzo Tañada	Nationalist Citizens' Party	344,685	7.33
Restituto Fresto	Lapiang Malaya	10,494	0.22
Total		4,702,478	100.00
Valid votes		4,702,478	92.06
Invalid/blank votes		405,634	7.94
Total votes		5,108,112	100.00
Registered voters/turnout		6,763,897	75.52
Source: Nohlen, Grotz, Hartmann, Hasall and Santos

Province/City	Macapagal	Laurel	Tañada	Araneta	Fresto
Abra	16,400	7,441	338	1,614	0
Agusan	13,458	19,481	794	1,858	0
Aklan	25,348	19,074	802	2,442	2
Albay	43,104	26,504	2,239	11,149	28
Antique	17,499	21,948	849	2,588	295
Bacolod City	12,529	4,519	2,936	3,675	0
Baguio	7,884	1,480	1,413	773	2
Bataan	24,853	8,016	2,129	1,685	13
Batanes	1,233	1,194	37	304	1
Batangas	9,675	92,459	48,730	1,504	1,051
Bohol	37,205	88,037	275	776	0
Bukidnon	6,281	8,940	368	2,351	1
Bulacan	83,471	36,715	11,172	12,745	326
Butuan	7,582	11,264	510	1,256	0
Cabanatuan	6,294	2,971	785	1,218	0
Cagayan	30,659	22,649	2,267	8,023	0
Cagayan de Oro	3,901	3,571	1,922	3,003	0
Calbayog	6,181	8,351	20	40	0
Camarines Norte	19,118	9,962	2,265	3,086	48
Camarines Sur	56,063	34,624	4,578	12,892	0
Capiz	30,019	20,496	397	2,041	0
Catanduanes	10,868	12,161	383	2,687	0
Cavite	33,577	31,464	9,792	3,798	416
Cavite City	5,822	1,994	2,041	828	0
Cebu	71,074	99,384	3,310	21,268	0
Cebu City	28,080	7,831	2,386	6,045	1
Cotabato	44,673	52,039	2,180	9,077	0
Dagupan	9,655	5,916	270	566	0
Davao	23,367	56,906	1,374	3,432	0
Davao City	13,654	25,608	1,723	1,610	0
Dumaguete	3,105	2,986	276	643	0
Iligan City	3,162	4,927	383	1,791	0
Ilocos Norte	43,588	18,379	1,335	3,523	38
Ilocos Sur	53,785	17,783	2,163	7,184	14
Iloilo	77,382	56,807	8,383	26,942	0
Iloilo City	14,980	13,309	1,942	7,077	0
Isabela	27,640	15,734	1,797	6,883	457
La Union	45,465	13,913	721	3,260	0
Laguna	38,274	29,602	14,151	10,255	249
Lanao	22,605	28,926	271	2,971	0
Leyte	75,326	105,248	2,258	5,102	194
Manila	144,225	43,557	30,044	17,581	0
Marawi City	2,222	3,328	20	98	0
Marinduque	6,461	11,628	2,433	4,285	20
Masbate	20,545	18,980	981	5,803	2
Misamis Occidental	17,146	19,174	857	1,490	0
Misamis Oriental	10,229	22,344	4,444	9,940	0
Mountain Province	26,163	11,364	1,102	7,618	0
Naga City	4,683	1,946	720	1,157	5
Negros Occidental	62,700	58,753	10,086	14,924	0
Negros Oriental	31,041	40,270	9,023	3,131	2
Nueva Ecija	55,851	26,241	5,241	10,603	1,458
Nueva Vizcaya	12,816	4,753	282	4,035	0
Occidental Mindoro	7,561	7,715	664	477	0
Oriental Mindoro	12,412	18,247	5,766	2,597	0
Ormoc City	3,391	7,774	351	181	0
Ozamiz City	3,219	4,110	447	1,167	0
Palawan	11,812	12,301	212	792	0
Pampanga	104,581	8,777	1,991	3,939	0
Pangasinan	150,194	84,695	2,297	16,016	2,250
Pasay City	15,670	5,714	3,562	1,966	176
Quezon	13,554	20,340	76,694	5,024	1,743
Quezon City	26,394	10,832	5,682	3,093	268
Rizal	98,105	44,040	20,691	19,677	992
Romblon	12,846	13,186	99	65	0
Roxas City	6,931	3,799	221	240	0
Samar	20,884	56,820	1,012	9,124	0
San Pablo City	4,177	4,822	6,089	1,371	0
Silay City	2,313	3,187	720	2,767	0
Sorsogon	33,121	28,204	711	5,342	46
Sulu	15,133	9,121	479	1,115	0
Surigao	23,749	37,344	2,877	3,425	1
Tacloban City	4,939	6,061	198	507	0
Tagaytay City	252	1,364	21	0	0
Tarlac	57,353	16,456	1,286	5,646	156
Trece Martires City	50	187	3	6	0
Zambales	27,841	12,635	1,306	4,424	238
Zamboanga del Norte	10,614	21,542	765	818	1
Zamboanga del Sur	23,180	30,798	4,442	4,681	0
Total	2,189,197	1,783,012	344,685	375,090	10,494
Province/City					
Province/City	Macapagal	Laurel	Tañada	Araneta	Fresto
