= 1957 Philippine House of Representatives elections =

11th Philippine House of Representatives elections

- November 12, 1957

All 102 seats in the House of Representatives of the Philippines 52 seats needed for a majority
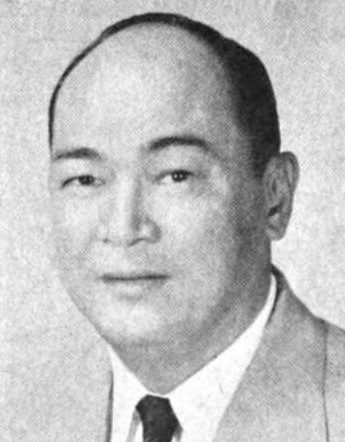

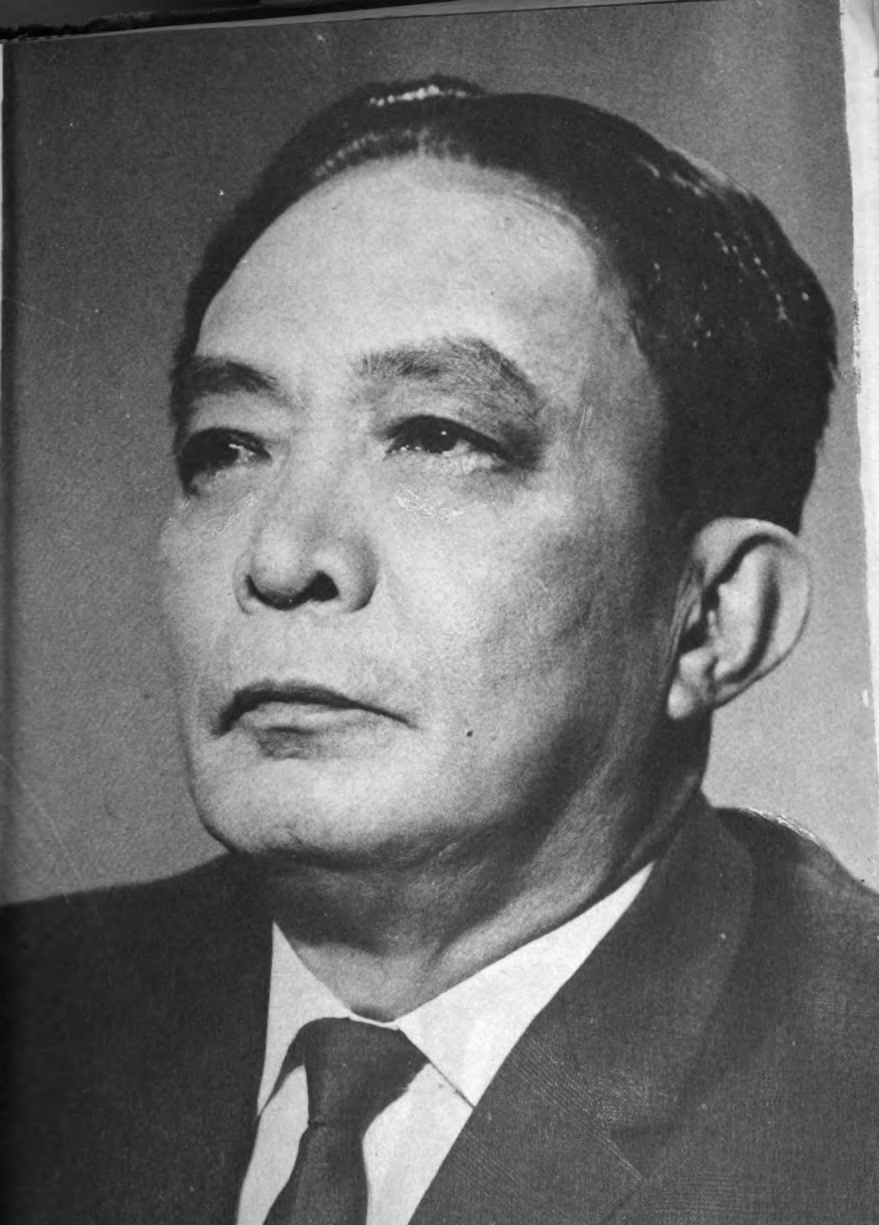
	Majority party	Minority party
Leader	Daniel Romualdez	Cornelio Villareal
Party	Nacionalista	Liberal
Leader's seat	Leyte–4th	Capiz–2nd
Last election	31 seats, 47.30%	59 seats, 39.81%
Seats won	82	19
Seat change	▲51	▼40
Popular vote	2,948,409	1,453,527
Percentage	61.19	30.17
Swing	▲13.89	▼9.64
Speaker before election
José Laurel, Jr.
Nacionalista
Elected Speaker
Daniel Romualdez
Nacionalista

Elections for the House of Representatives of the Philippines were held on November 12, 1957. Held on the same day as the presidential election, the party of the incumbent president, Carlos P. Garcia's Nacionalista Party, won a majority of the seats in the House of Representatives.

The elected representatives served in the 4th Congress from 1957 to 1961.

== Electoral system ==
The House of Representatives has at most 120 seats, 102 seats for this election, all voted via first-past-the-post in single-member districts. Each province is guaranteed at least one congressional district, with more populous provinces divided into two or more districts.

Congress has the power of redistricting three years after each census.

== Redistricting ==
No redistricting laws were passed by the 3rd Congress.

== Results ==
Party	Votes	%	+/–	Seats	+/–
Nacionalista Party	2,948,409	61.19	+13.89	82	+51
Liberal Party	1,453,527	30.17	−9.64	19	−40
Nationalist Citizens' Party	137,093	2.85	New	1	New
Progressive Party	62,968	1.31	New	0	0
Nacionalista Party (independent)	51,729	1.07	+0.04	0	0
Democratic Party	42,890	0.89	−6.07	0	−9
United Rural Community	3,296	0.07	New	0	0
Liberal Party (independent)	2,802	0.06	−0.58	0	0
Lapiang Makabansa	1,765	0.04	New	0	0
People's (Veterans) Democratic Movement for Good Government	968	0.02	New	0	0
Partido'y Makahirap	524	0.01	New	0	0
National Patriotic Party	12	0.00	New	0	0
Independent	112,537	2.34	−0.38	0	−1
Total	4,818,520	100.00	–	102	0
Valid votes	4,818,520	94.33	−0.00		
Invalid/blank votes	289,562	5.67	+0.00		
Total votes	5,108,082	100.00	–		
Registered voters/turnout	6,763,897	75.52	−1.70		
Source: Nohlen, Grotz and Hartmann and Teehankee

Vote share
NP	61.19%
LP	30.17%
NCP	2.85%
Others	8.81%

Seats
NP	80.39%
LP	18.63%
NCP	0.98%
Others	0.00%

== See also ==
- 4th Congress of the Philippines

== Bibliography ==
- Paras, Corazon L. (2000). The Presidents of the Senate of the Republic of the Philippines. Giraffe Books. ISBN 971-8832-24-6.
- Pobre, Cesar P. (2000). Philippine Legislature 100 Years. Philippine Historical Association. ISBN 971-92245-0-9.
