= 1957 Philippine Senate election =

15th Philippine senatorial election

- November 12, 1957

8 (of the 24) seats in the Senate 13 seats needed for a majority
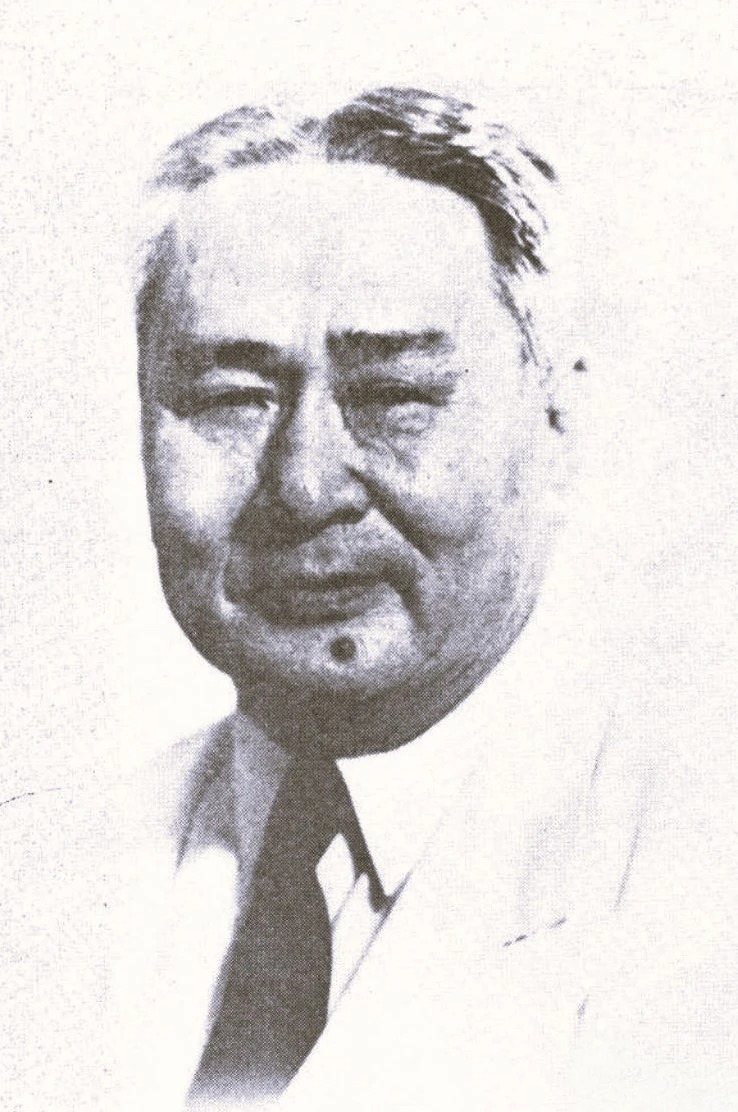

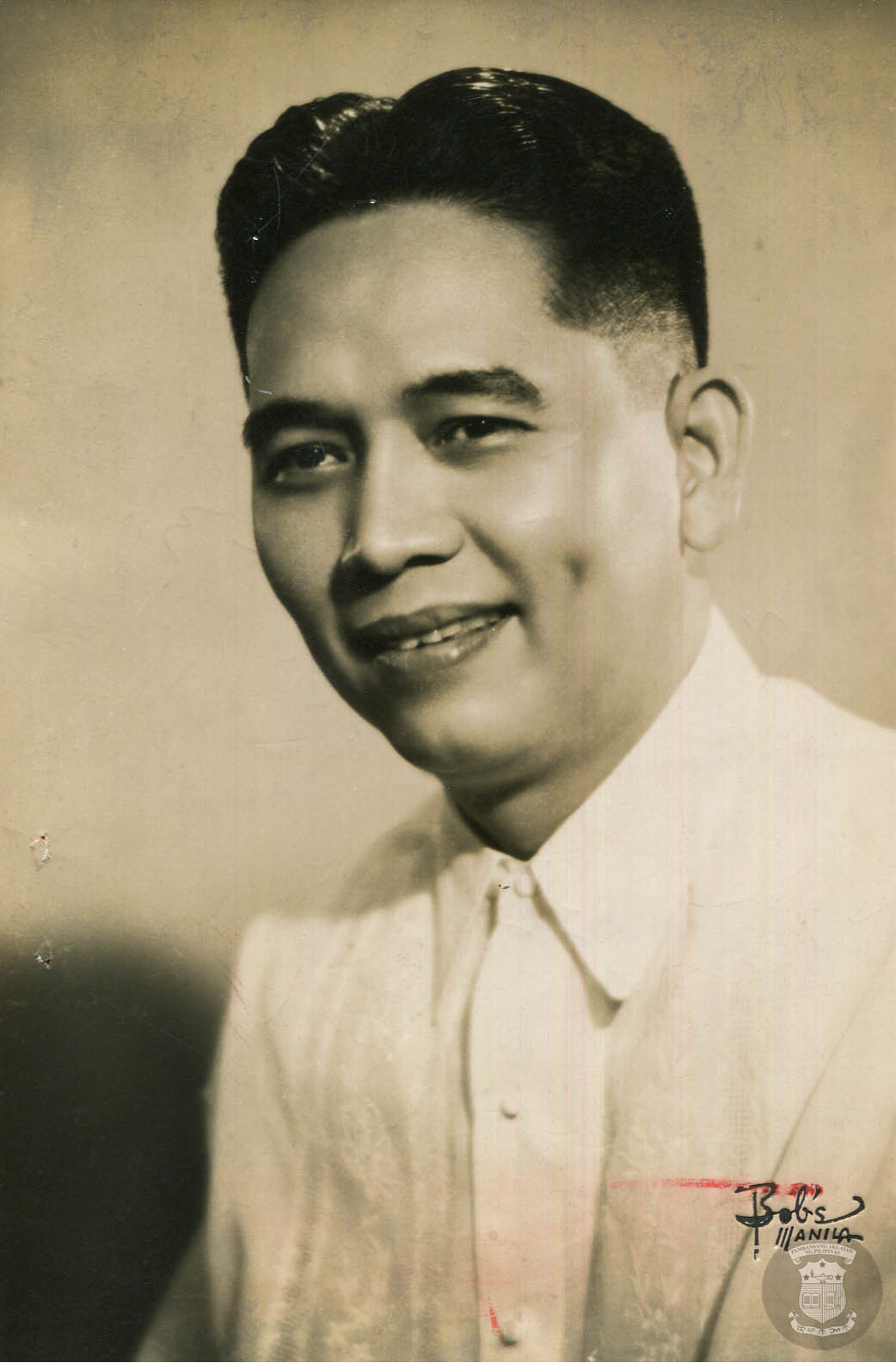

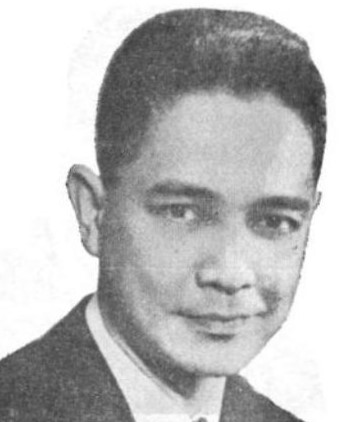

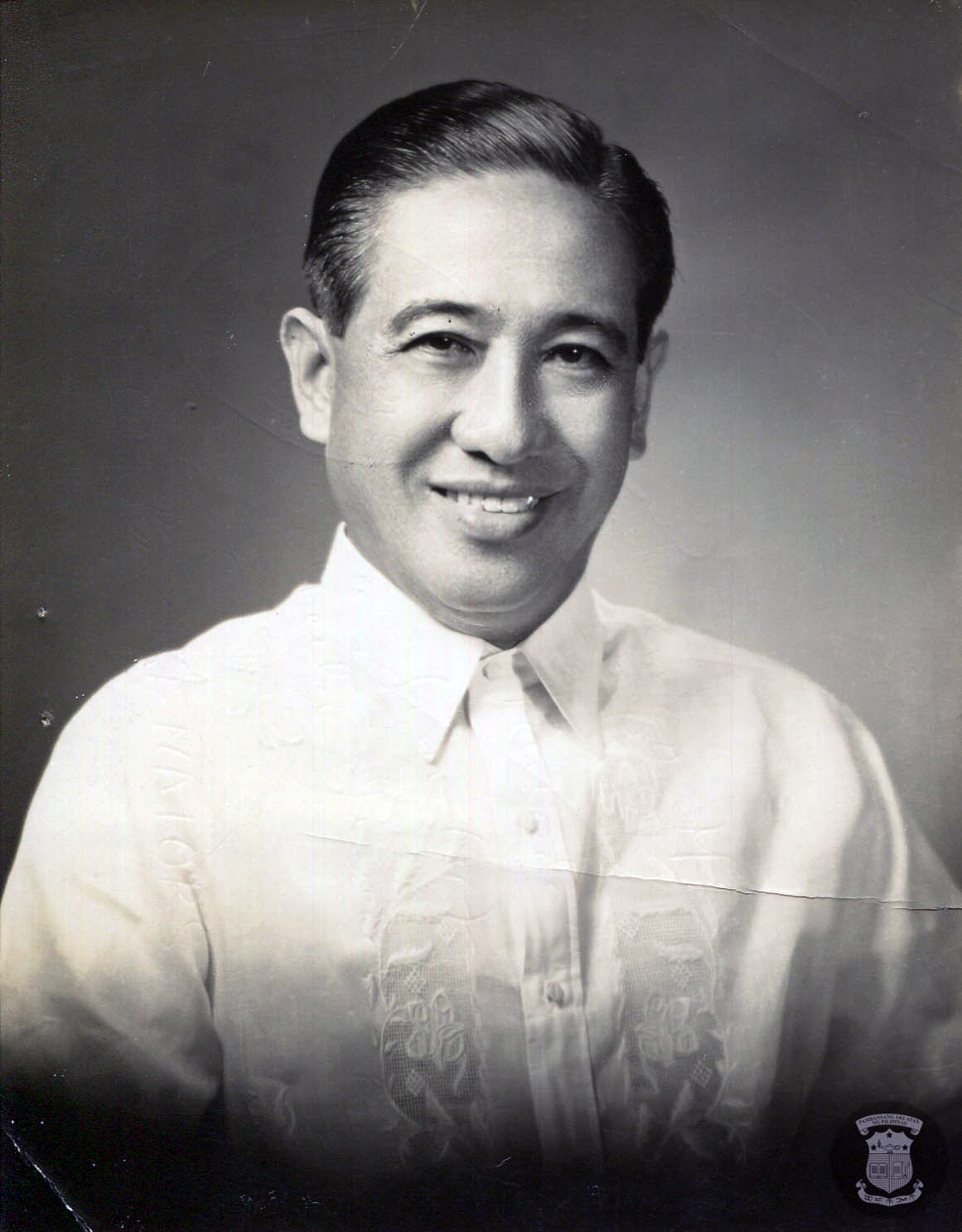

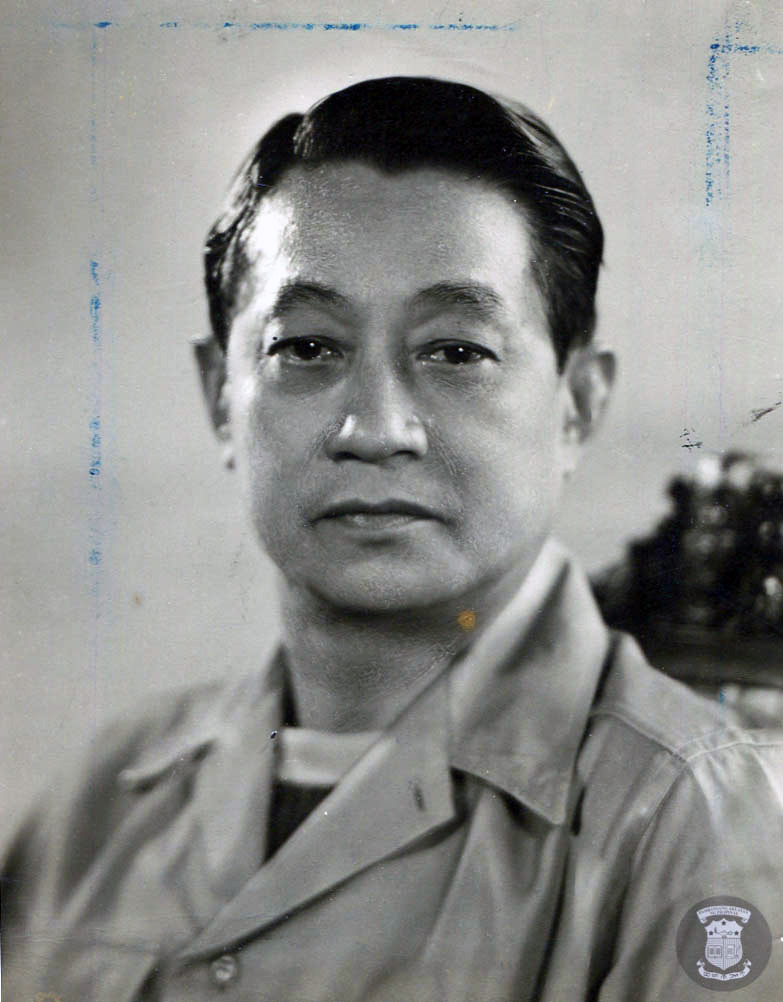
	Majority party	Minority party	Third party
Leader	Eulogio Rodriguez	Ambrosio Padilla	Raul Manglapus (lost)
Party	Nacionalista	Liberal	Progressive
Seats before	20 (6 up)	0	0
Seats won	6	2	0
Seats after	20	2	0
Seat change	Steady	▲2	Steady
Popular vote	13,271,831	8,898,218	3,393,935
Percentage	47.28	31.70	12.09
Swing	▼19.90	▼1.01	▲12.09
	Fourth party	Fifth party
Leader	Lorenzo Tañada	Jose Zulueta
Party	NCP	PVDMGG
Seats before	2 (0 up)	1 (up)
Seats won	0	0
Seats after	2	0
Seat change	Steady	▼1
Popular vote	1,949,972	346,585
Percentage	6.95	1.23
Swing	▲6.95	▲1.23
Senate President before election
Eulogio Rodriguez
Nacionalista
Elected Senate President
Eulogio Rodriguez
Nacionalista

The 15th election of members to the Senate of the Philippines was held on November 12, 1957. The Nacionalista Party, despite losing two seats to the Liberal Party still held the Senate with twenty seats. The Liberals who won were actor Rogelio de la Rosa and former basketball player Ambrosio Padilla.

== Electoral system ==
Philippine Senate elections are held via plurality block voting with staggered elections, with the country as an at-large district. The Senate has 24 seats, of which 8 seats are up every 2 years. The eight seats up were last contested in 1951; each voter has eight votes and can vote up to eight names, of which the eight candidates with the most votes winning the election.

== Retiring incumbents ==
1. Jose P. Laurel (Nacionalista), retired from politics

=== Mid-term vacancies ===
1. Manuel Briones (Nacionalista), died on September 29, 1957

=== Incumbents running elsewhere ===
These ran in the middle of their Senate terms. For those losing in their respective elections, they can still return to the Senate to serve out their term, while the winners will vacate their Senate seats, then it would have been contested in a special election concurrently with the next general election.

1. Claro M. Recto (NCP), ran for president and lost
2. Lorenzo Tañada (NCP), ran for vice president and lost

== Results ==
The Nacionalista Party won six seats contested in the election, while the Liberal Party won two.

Nacionalistas Roseller T. Lim, Cipriano Primcias Sr., and Gil Puyat defended their Senate seats

The two winning Liberals are neophyte senators: Ambrosio Padilla and Rogelio de la Rosa. Also entering the Senate for the first time are Nacionalistas Eulogio Balao, Oscar Ledesma, and Arturo Tolentino.

Incumbent Jose Zulueta left the Nacionalista Party for the People's (Veterans) Democratic Movement for Good Government; he lost the election. Two Nacionalistas also lost: Francisco Afan Delgado and Jose Locsin.

	1	2	3	4	5	6	7	8	9	10	11	12	13	14	15	16	17	18	19	20	21	22	23	24
Before election			‡	‡^	‡	‡	‡	‡	‡	‡														
Election result	Not up		LP		NP						Not up													
After election			+	+	*	*	*	√	√	√														

Key:

- ‡ Seats up
- + Gained by a party from another party
- √ Held by the incumbent
- * Held by the same party with a new senator
- ^ Vacant

=== Per candidate ===
Candidate	Party	Votes	%
Gil Puyat	Nacionalista Party	2,189,909	42.87
Arturo Tolentino	Nacionalista Party	1,982,708	38.81
Eulogio Balao	Nacionalista Party	1,851,157	36.24
Rogelio de la Rosa	Liberal Party	1,715,123	33.58
Oscar Ledesma	Nacionalista Party	1,670,774	32.71
Ambrosio Padilla	Liberal Party	1,636,202	32.03
Roseller T. Lim	Nacionalista Party	1,558,322	30.51
Cipriano Primicias Sr.	Nacionalista Party	1,350,868	26.45
Jose Locsin	Nacionalista Party	1,347,797	26.39
Francisco Afan Delgado	Nacionalista Party	1,320,296	25.85
Osmundo Mondoñedo	Liberal Party	1,011,053	19.79
Raul Manglapus	Progressive Party	1,005,595	19.69
Narciso Pimentel Jr.	Liberal Party	1,004,944	19.67
Estanislao Fernandez	Liberal Party	997,562	19.53
Juan Liwag	Liberal Party	918,785	17.99
Consuelo Salazar-Perez	Liberal Party	844,950	16.54
Marcos Calo	Liberal Party	769,599	15.07
Pacita de los Reyes-Phillips	Nationalist Citizens' Party	641,716	12.56
Terry Adevoso	Progressive Party	562,491	11.01
Josefa Gonzales-Estrada	Progressive Party	423,319	8.29
Antonio Maceda	Nationalist Citizens' Party	383,531	7.51
Jaime Ferrer	Progressive Party	345,881	6.77
Jose M. Hernandez	Progressive Party	339,909	6.65
Fulvio Pelaez	Progressive Party	313,221	6.13
Mario Bengzon	Nationalist Citizens' Party	265,859	5.20
Jose Zulueta	People's (Veterans) Democratic Movement for Good Government	213,465	4.18
Norberto Romualdez Jr.	Progressive Party	210,822	4.13
Rodrigo Perez Jr.	Progressive Party	192,697	3.77
Cipriano Cid	Nationalist Citizens' Party	162,493	3.18
Emilio Javier	Nationalist Citizens' Party	155,867	3.05
Vicente Llanes	Nationalist Citizens' Party	124,744	2.44
Manuel Abella	Nationalist Citizens' Party	116,509	2.28
Gonzalo Vasquez	Nationalist Citizens' Party	99,253	1.94
Severino Luna	Independent	59,690	1.17
Remedios Magsaysay	Independent	59,000	1.16
Atilano Cinco	People's (Veterans) Democratic Movement for Good Government	48,863	0.96
Vicente Rafael	People's (Veterans) Democratic Movement for Good Government	47,883	0.94
Miguel Pendon	People's (Veterans) Democratic Movement for Good Government	24,458	0.48
Felicidad Villanueva	Women's Party	14,725	0.29
Antonia Lumibao	People's (Veterans) Democratic Movement for Good Government	11,916	0.23
Dominador Portugal	Lapiang Malaya	8,915	0.17
Eulogio Duyan	Lapiang Malaya	8,434	0.17
Romualdo Saclayan	Lapiang Malaya	8,235	0.16
Deogracias Pedrosa	Lapiang Malaya	7,919	0.16
Jose Villanueva	Lapiang Malaya	7,805	0.15
Luis de Guzman	Lapiang Malaya	7,781	0.15
Emmanuel Rey	Lapiang Malaya	7,123	0.14
Teofilo Ramas	Lapiang Malaya	6,470	0.13
Jose Canuto	Independent	6,147	0.12
Arturo Samaniego	Liberal Party (Quirino wing) (Note: The supporters of Antonio Quirino in the Liberal Party ran candidates under the Quirino wing of that party.)	2,515	0.05
Ciriaco de las Liagas	Independent	2,427	0.05
Patricio Ceniza	Independent	2,119	0.04
Gregorio Llanza	Independent	1,333	0.03
Consuelo Fa Alvear	Independent	1,135	0.02
Total		28,072,314	100.00
Total votes		5,108,112	–
Registered voters/turnout		6,763,897	75.52

=== Per party ===
Party	Votes	%	+/–	Seats				
Party	Votes	%	+/–	Up	Before	Won	After	+/−
Nacionalista Party	13,271,831	47.28	−19.90	6	20	6	20	+1
Liberal Party	8,898,218	31.70	−1.01	0	0	2	2	+2
Progressive Party	3,393,935	12.09	New	0	0	0	0	0
Nationalist Citizens' Party	1,949,972	6.95	New	0	2	0	2	0
People's (Veterans) Democratic Movement for Good Government	346,585	1.23	New	1	1	0	0	−1
Lapiang Malaya	62,682	0.22	New	0	0	0	0	0
Women's Party	14,725	0.05	New	0	0	0	0	0
Liberal Party (Quirino wing)	2,515	0.01	New	0	0	0	0	0
Independent	131,851	0.47	+0.45	0	0	0	0	0
Vacancy				1	1	0	0	−1
Total	28,072,314	100.00	–	8	24	8	24	0
Total votes	5,108,112	–						
Registered voters/turnout	6,763,897	75.52						

Vote share
NP	47.28%
LP	31.70%
Others	21.02%

Senate seats
NP	75.00%
LP	25.00%
Others	0.00%

== Defeated incumbents ==
1. Francisco Afan Delgado (Nacionalista), appointed as permanent representative to the United Nations in 1958
2. Jose Locsin (Nacionalista), appointed as chairman of the National Economic Council in 1958
3. Jose Zulueta (PVDMGG), ran for governor of Iloilo in 1959 and won

== See also ==
- Commission on Elections
- 4th Congress of the Philippines
