= Nationalist Citizens' Party =

Defunct Filipino nationalist political party founded by Claro M. Recto

- Founder: Claro M. Recto; Lorenzo Tañada
- Founded: 1957
- Dissolved: 1972
- Split from: Nacionalista; Liberal
- Preceded by: Citizens' Party
- Ideology: Filipino nationalism Protectionism; Filipino First policy
- Political position: Centre-right

The Nationalist Citizens' Party (NCP; Lapiang Makabansa) was a Philippine nationalist party established by Claro M. Recto and Lorenzo Tañada in 1957. Recto became its presidential candidate for the 1957 presidential election, where he was defeated, getting 9% of the vote. Tañada was eventually elected to the Senate under the party in 1959. The NCP functioned as a third party in a political climate dominated by the Nacionalista Party and the Liberal Party.

== History ==
With President Ramon Magsaysay's death in 1957, several members of his Nacionalista Party (NP) became dissatisfied with Carlos P. Garcia (Magsaysay's vice president who succeeded him). These members bolted out of the NP and established the Progressive Party, while Recto and Tañada established the Nationalist Citizens' Party, with Recto resigning from the NP and merging with Tañada's Citizens' Party.

The NCP, with an anti-foreign platform, participated in the 1957 elections and were defeated: Recto and Tañada came in at fourth place in the presidential and vice presidential elections, respectively (they are elected separately) with 7% of the vote, behind Garcia (NP) and Diosdado Macapagal (Liberal Party). The nationalist undertaking was described as "an elitist undertaking, popular in the press... but largely ignored by the Filipino masses." While the NCP was never "considered [as] a broad democratic party," and was labeled as "businessman's nationalism," they were able to influence Garcia's administration by adopting a "Filipino First policy" which favors Philippine-made products over foreign-made ones.

The cooperation between the NP and the NCP produced an appointment of Garcia of Recto to his cabinet, and an NP-NCP alliance for the 1959 Senate election, where Tañada won a Senate seat. However, Recto died in 1960, and nationalism and Garcia's Filipino First policy was branded by the Liberals as corrupt; Garcia and the NP lost the 1961 presidential and vice presidential elections to Macapagal and Emmanuel Pelaez.

Tañada would later be reelected to the Senate under the NCP banner in 1965 for the last time.

== Electoral performance ==
=== Presidential and vice presidential elections ===
Year	Presidential election				Vice presidential election			
Year	Candidate	Votes	Vote share	Result	Candidate	Votes	Vote share	Result
1957	Claro M. Recto	429,226	8.55%	Carlos Garcia (Nacionalista)	Lorenzo Tañada	344,685	7.32%	Diosdado Macapagal (Liberal)

=== Legislative elections ===
Congress of the Philippines
Senate				House of Representatives		
Year	Seats won	Ticket	Result	Year	Seats won	Result
1957	0 / 8	Single party ticket	Nacionalista won 5/8	1957	1 / 102	Nacionalista won
1959	1 / 8	Single party ticket	Nacionalista won 5/8	1957	1 / 102	Nacionalista won
1961	Did not participate		Liberal won 4/8	1961	0 / 104	Nacionalista won
1963	Did not participate		Both Nacionalista and Liberal won 4/8	1961	0 / 104	Nacionalista won
1965	1 / 8	Single party ticket	Nacionalista won 5/8	1965	Did not participate	
