= Valentin de los Santos =

Valentin de los Santos was a Filipino religious leader and political activist. Santos founded and led the Lapiang Malaya, a political movement that opposed the government of Ferdinand Marcos.

== Biography ==
Valentin de los Santos was born on the Filipino island of Luzon in the early 20th century. In the 1940s, Santos began a Christianity-based political movement in Northern Luzon advocating for more economic and social equality. Many people were drawn to Santos' style of leadership, which involved him teaching new methods of prayer to people. As noted by one source, Santos taught his followers a "beautiful way" in which to pray and interact positively with others; this was in contrast to other Filipino priests, who focused more on preaching and community functions. Santos' messages also revolved around nonviolence, equality, and nationalism - political credos which helped the Lapiang Malaya garner support among the poorer peoples of Luzon. The party supported Santos when he ran for president in the Philippine presidential election of 1957.

In addition to being the leader of the Lapiang Malaya, Santos became renowned in Luzon for his charisma. He was also purported to have healing abilities, superhuman strength, and invulnerability to bullets; some of these beliefs were shared by other members of the Lapiang Malaya. Santos was also believed by his followers to have invented a number of inventions, including the traffic light. He is also alleged to have direct contact with Bathala (Supreme god) and past notable Filipinos such as Jose Rizal.

In the Spring of 1967, Santos and the Lapiang Malaya organized a political rally in the Philippine capital of Manila, where they intended to peacefully overthrow the government of Ferdinand Marcos. The organization marched on Malacañang Palace on 20 May, but were intercepted by the Philippine Constabulary. They were armed with bolo knives and anting-anting or amulets. The crowd was eventually dispersed with force, resulting in the deaths of 33 people, after which Santos was arrested. He was judged to be insane by the Filipino government and confined to the National Center for Mental Health, where he was eventually killed by another patient. Following his incarceration and death, his son-in-law, Domingo De Guia, replaced him as the head of Lapiang Malaya.
