= Lapiang Malaya =

- Leader: Valentin de los Santos
- Founded: 1940s
- Dissolved: 1967

The Lapiang Malaya (Filipino for "Freedom Movement" or "Freedom Party") was a religious and political group which was active in the Philippines during the 1950s to the 1960s.

Valentin de los Santos functioned as the group's leader.

== Establishment ==
Valentin de los Santos was a Bicolano and established Lapiang Malaya in the 1940s, building up its membership from the peasantry from Southern Luzon. He advocated true justice, true equality and true freedom in the country. His method of attaining his goals include communicating with the Bathala and Filipino heroes like Jose Rizal, linked the attainment of freedom with the Second Coming of Christ, and relied on amulets and prayers.

== 1957 presidential election ==
The party contested the 1957 presidential election with de los Santos and Restituto Fresto as their candidates for president and vice president, respectively. Both were defeated by incumbent Carlos P. Garcia, and Diosdado Macapagal, respectively, getting less than 0.50% of the vote. The party also contested the 1957 Senate election, although none of their candidates garnered enough votes to win seats in the Senate; with eight seats up for election and the country using plurality-at-large voting where each voter had eight votes and the eight candidates with the most votes are elected, the party's best candidate finished 41st with 8,915 votes, well behind the eighth-placed candidate which had 1,350,868 votes.

== Lapiang Malaya massacre ==
In May 1967, de los Santos publicly demanded that Marcos step down and surrender the Presidency to the Lapiang Malaya.

On May 20, 1967, the group began gathering for what they called a "parade-demonstration," with the intent of marching towards Malacañang Palace, for which more than 500 members dressed themselves up in blue uniforms with red and yellow capes, and armed themselves with bolos and anting-anting amulets. This was portrayed by government sources and media reports, including Time Magazine, as an attempt to overthrow the government of Ferdinand Marcos.

The Philippine Constabulary (PC), armed with M-16s, came to the group's headquarters on Taft Avenue in Pasay, preventing them from marching.

The PC tried numerous times to disperse the gathering, until May 21, 1967 when the tensions led to violence on both sides. As a result, 33 people were killed, of which 32 were Lapiang Malaya members. 358 were brought to detention centers in Camp Crame.

In reference to the "overkill" which saw heavily armed constabulary members confront bolo-wielding Lapiang Malaya members, the incident came to be referred to as “Bloody Sunday,” a phrase coined by the Manila Times in its reports.

The survivors and de los Santos were later arrested for sedition. De los Santos, instead of going to jail, was sent to the National Center for Mental Health since he was thought to be insane; most reports state that he was mauled and killed while in the hospital, while his supporters claim that he died peacefully past 80 years old at Nueva Vizcaya.

== Later years ==
It was also in Nueva Vizcaya where his supporters lived in seclusion for forty years. The leadership was succeeded by Domingo De Guia, de los Santos' son-in-law, who became famous by having the power to heal and established "Vucal ng Pananampalataya", their community in the province. When Domingo died in 2005, he was succeeded by his son, Tal De Guia. In 2008, Tal held a lechon festival, whose purpose was "to continuously and slowly reintegrate our brethren to the mainstream." He further added that "We are not a bad people as some would like to picture us."

== Electoral performance ==
=== For president ===
Year	Candidate	Votes	%	Result
1957	Valentin de los Santos	21,674	0.43%	Lost to Carlos P. Garcia

=== For vice president ===
Year	Candidate	Votes	%	Result
1957	Restituto Fresto	10,494	0.22%	Lost to Diosdado Macapagal

=== Senate ===
Year	Votes	%	Seats won	Seats after	Result
1957	62,682	0.22%	0 / 8	0 / 24	Lost
