= 1957 Philippine presidential election =

6th election of Philippine president

- November 12, 1957
- Turnout: 75.66 (▼1.7pp)
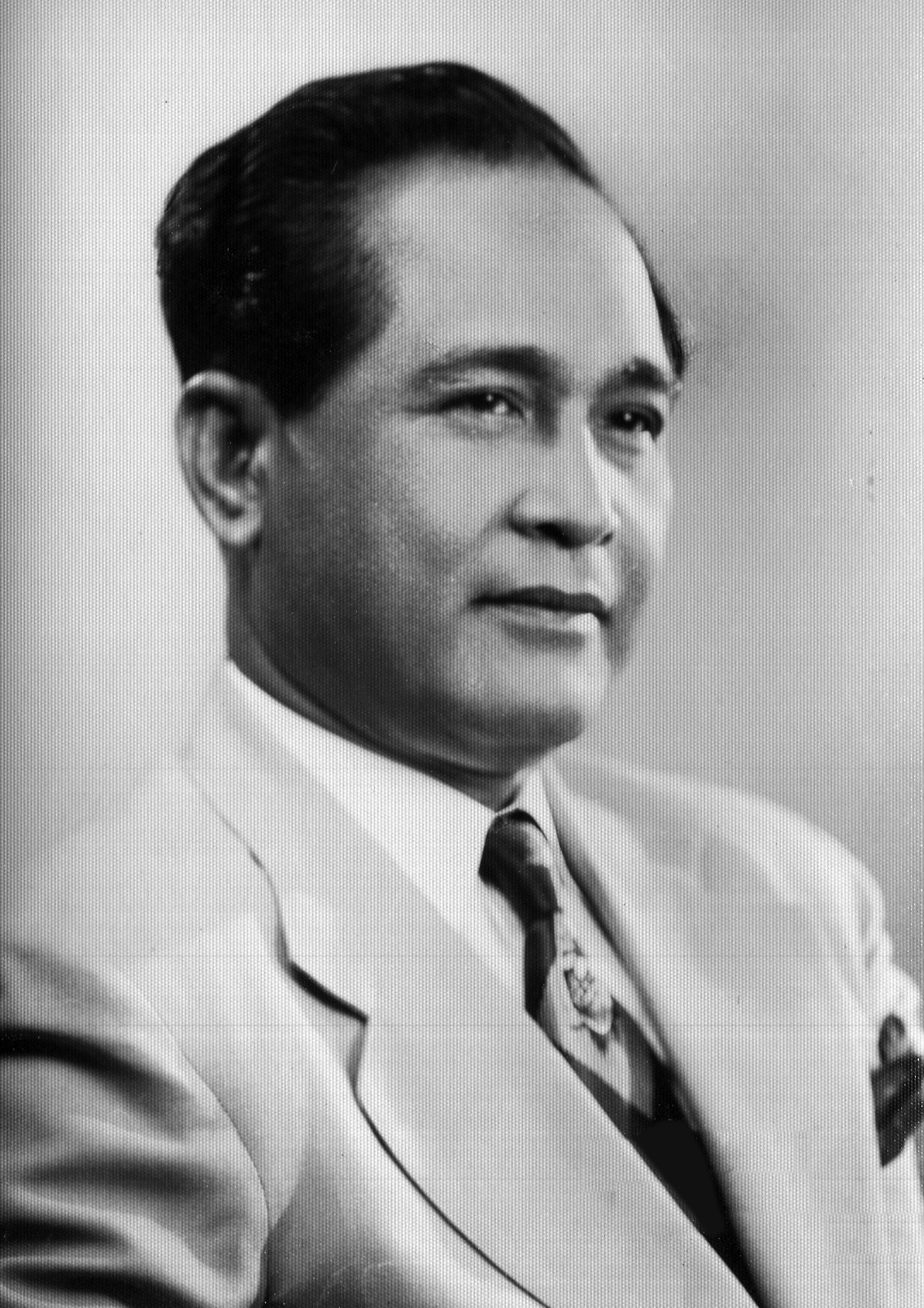

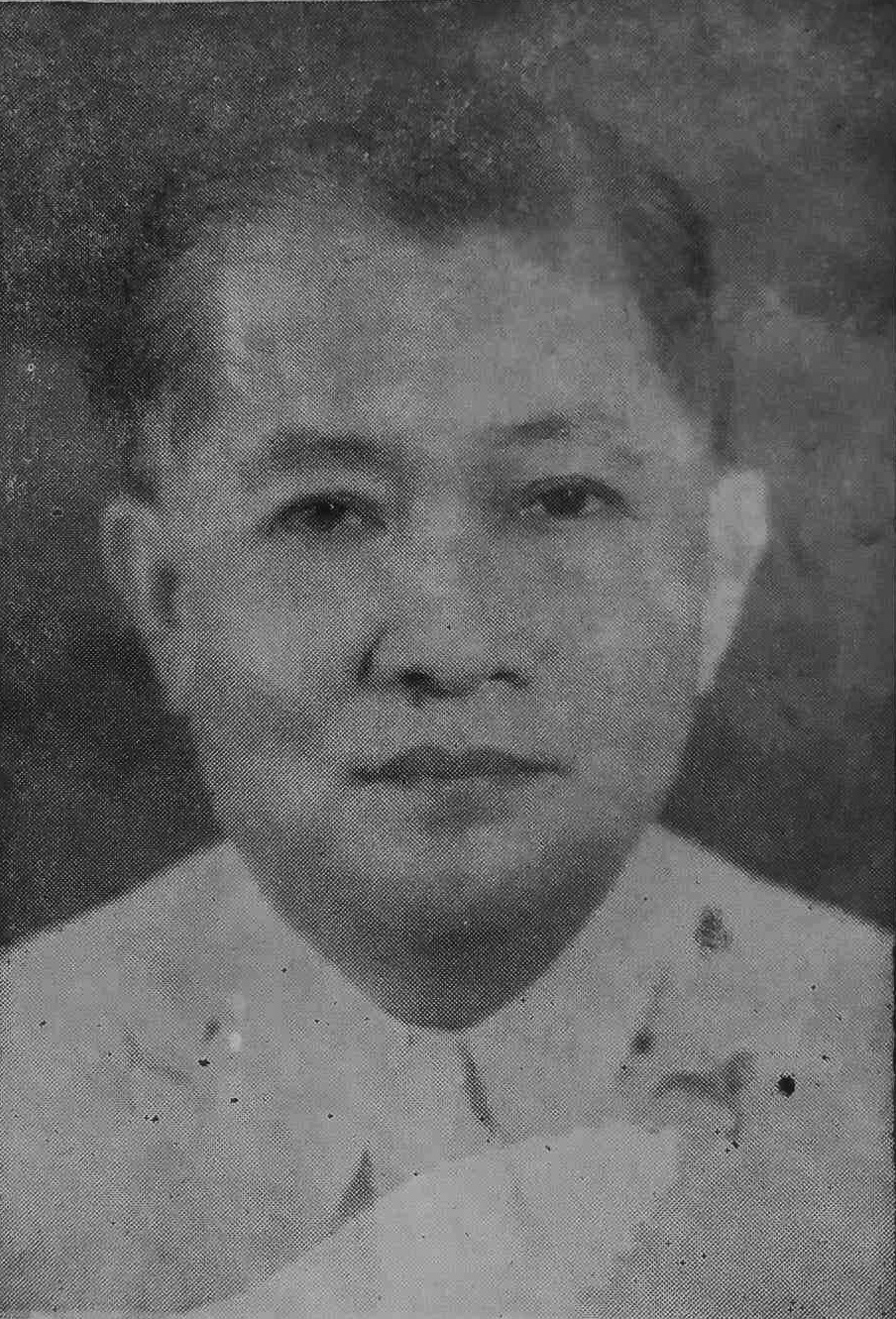

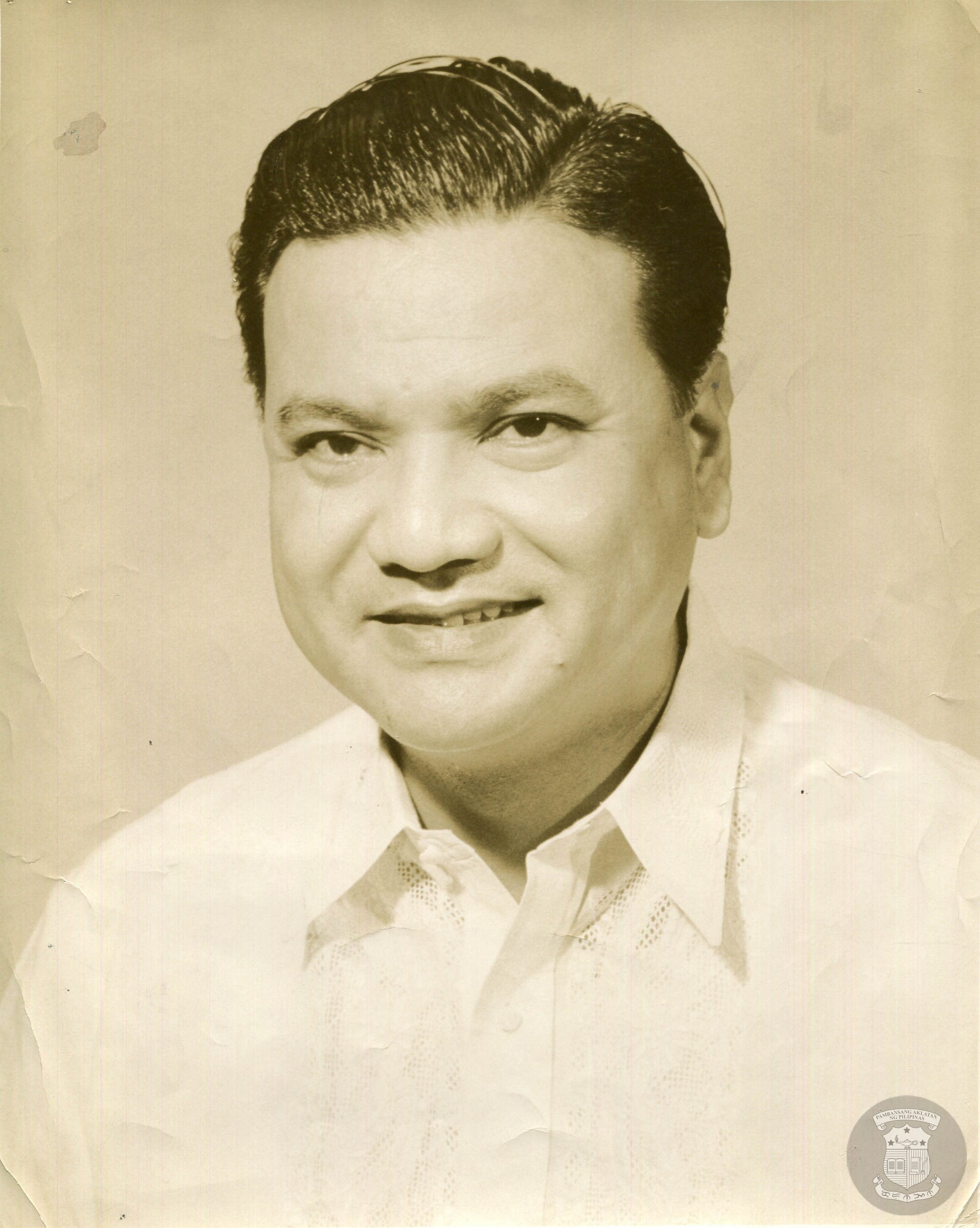

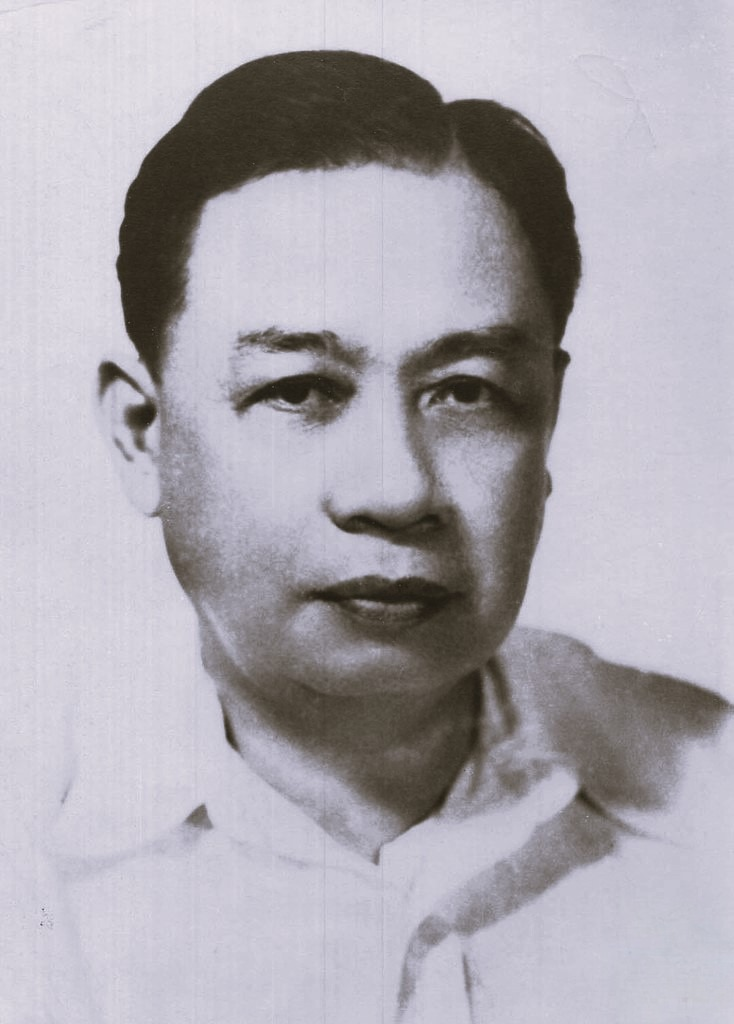
Nominee	Carlos P. Garcia	José Yulo
Party	Nacionalista	Liberal
Running mate	Jose Laurel Jr.	Diosdado Macapagal
Popular vote	2,072,257	1,386,829
Percentage	41.28%	27.62%
Nominee	Manuel Manahan	Claro M. Recto
Party	Progressive	NCP
Running mate	Vicente Araneta	Lorenzo Tañada
Popular vote	1,049,420	429,226
Percentage	20.90%	8.55%
- Election results per province/city.
President before election
Carlos P. Garcia
Nacionalista
Elected President
Carlos P. Garcia
Nacionalista
- 1957 Philippine vice presidential election
- November 12, 1957
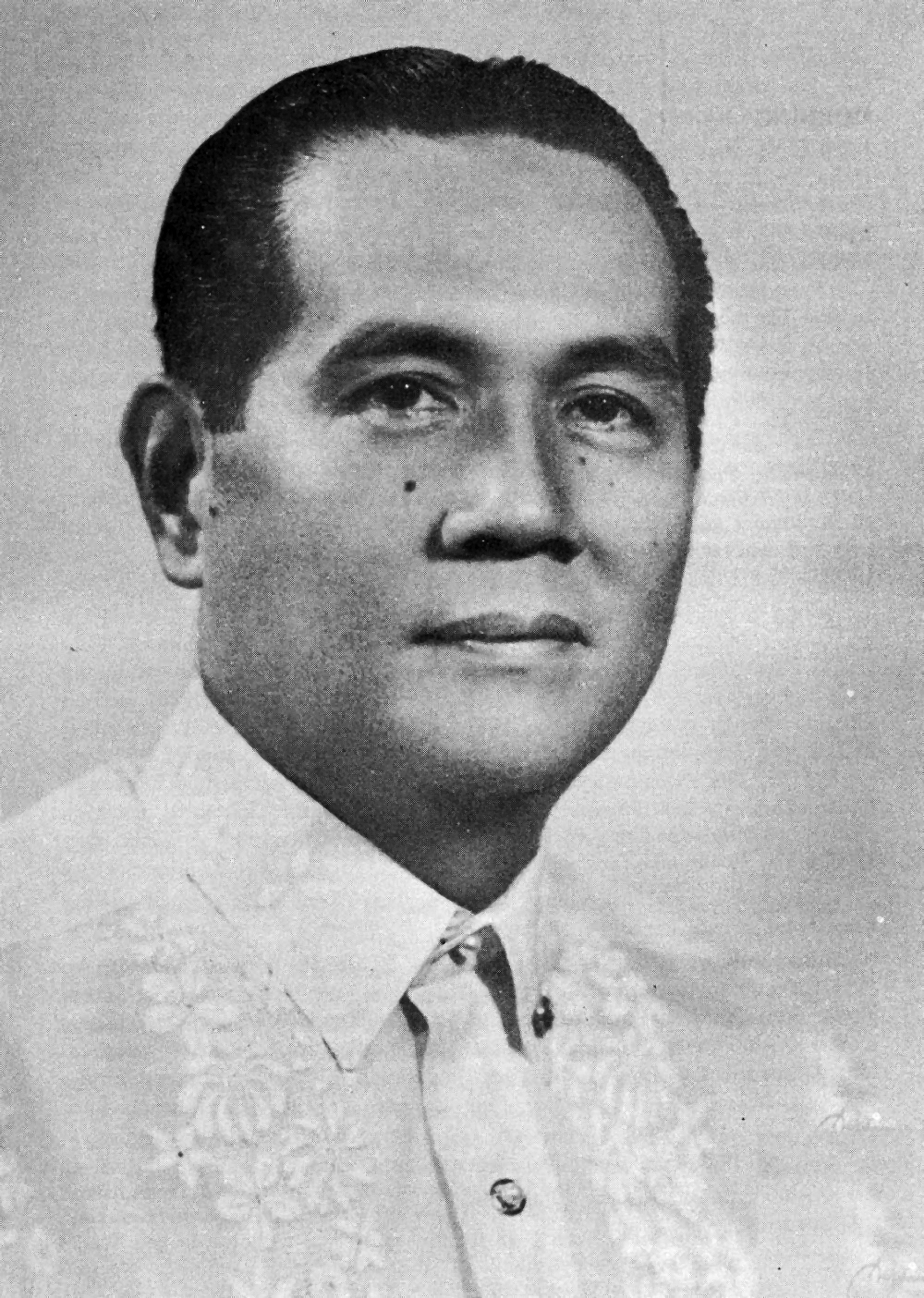

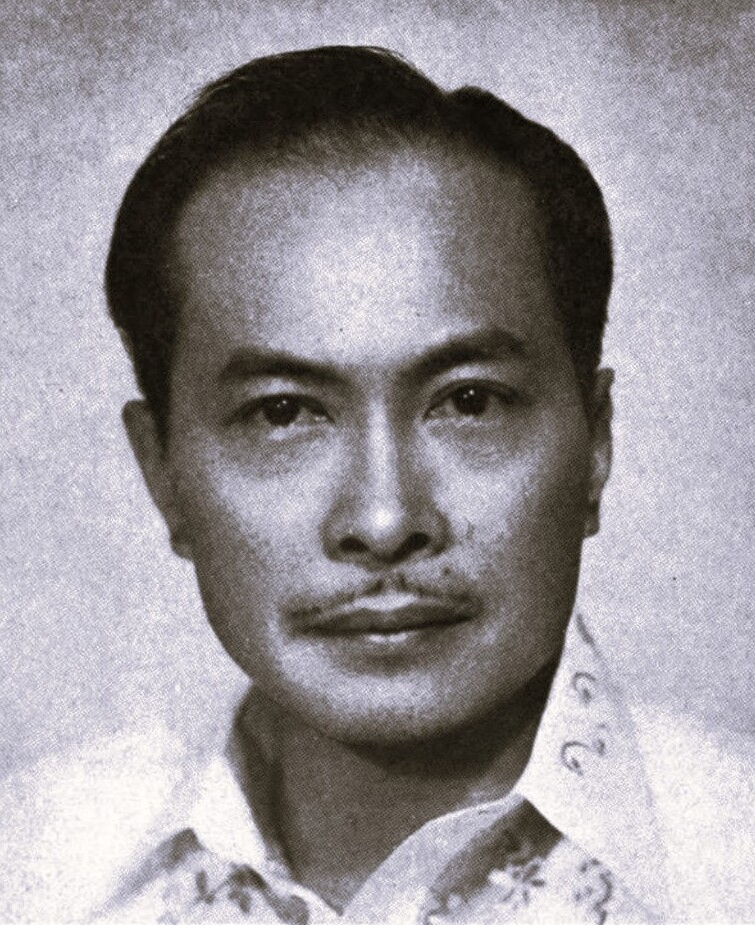

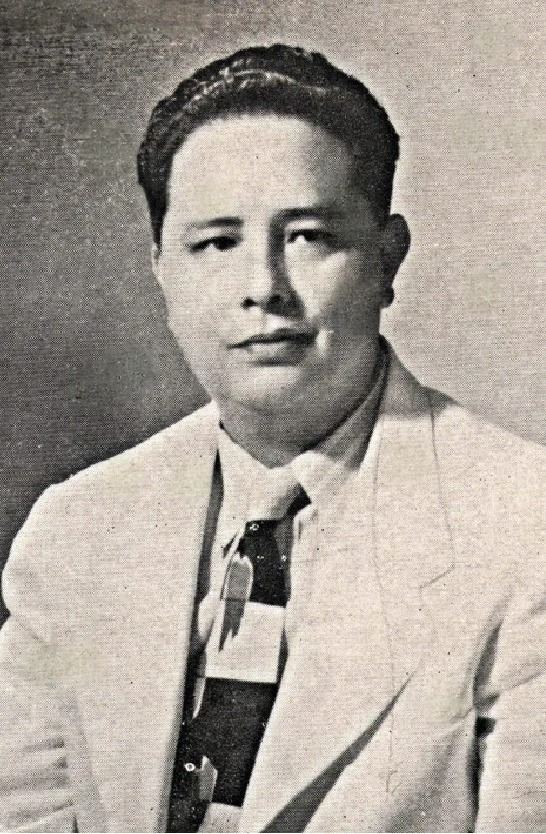

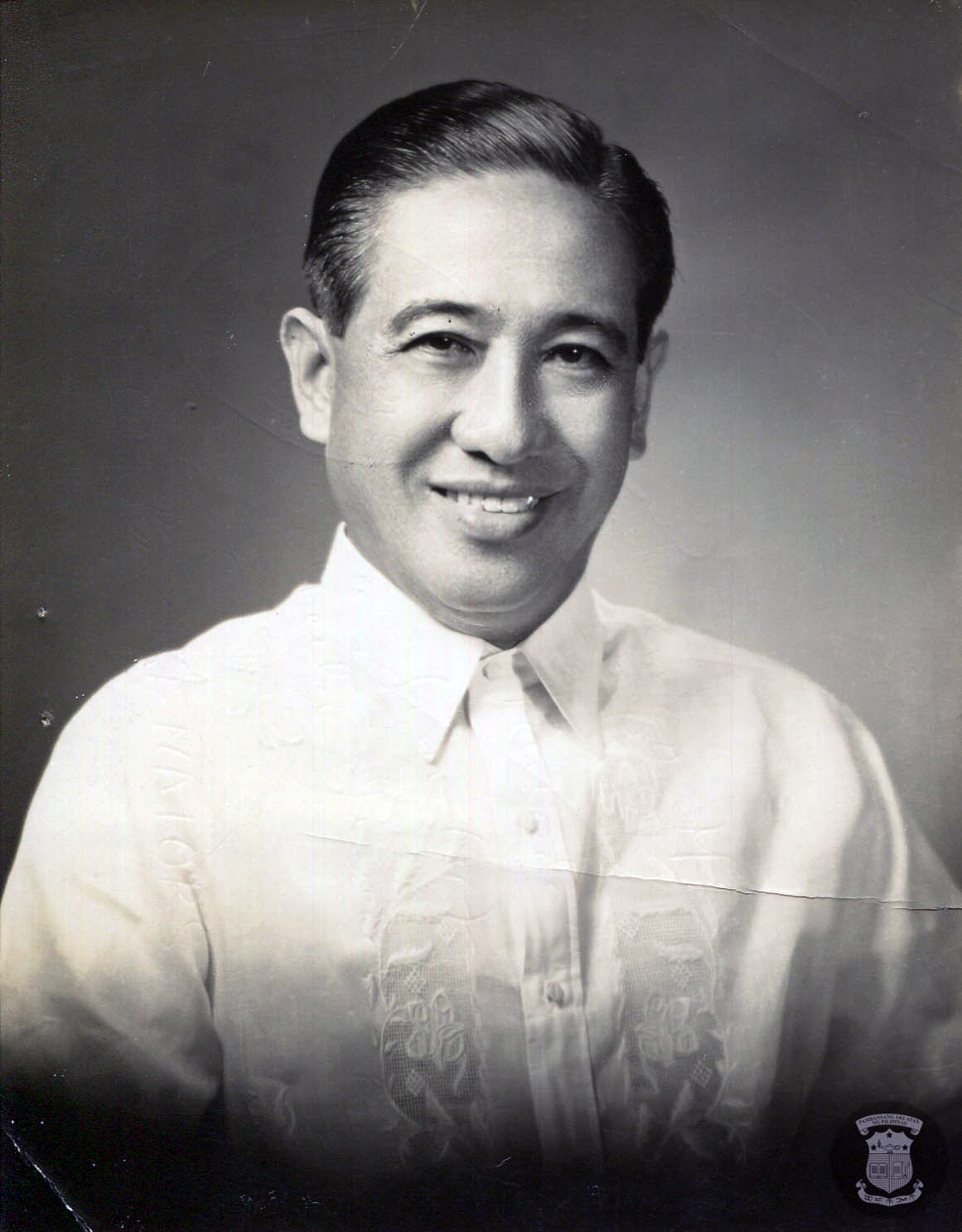
Candidate	Diosdado Macapagal	Jose Laurel Jr.
Party	Liberal	Nacionalista
Popular vote	2,189,197	1,783,012
Percentage	46.55%	37.92%
Nominee	Vicente Araneta	Lorenzo Tañada
Party	Progressive	NCP
Popular vote	375,090	344,685
Percentage	7.98%	7.33%
- Election results per province/city.
Vice President before election
None
Last held by: Carlos P. Garcia
Nacionalista
Elected Vice President
Diosdado Macapagal
Liberal

Presidential and vice presidential elections were held in the Philippines on November 12, 1957. Incumbent President Carlos P. Garcia, who was a Vice President to Ramon Magsaysay, was elected for a full term as President of the Philippines. Garcia assumed the post following Magsaysay's death in a plane crash earlier that year. His running mate, Speaker Jose Laurel Jr., lost to Pampanga Representative Diosdado Macapagal. This was the first time in Philippine electoral history wherein a president was elected by a plurality rather than a majority, and in which the winning presidential and vice presidential candidates came from different parties.

== Results ==
=== President ===
Candidate	Party	Votes	%
Carlos P. Garcia (incumbent)	Nacionalista Party	2,072,257	41.28
José Yulo	Liberal Party	1,386,829	27.62
Manuel Manahan	Progressive Party	1,049,420	20.90
Claro M. Recto	Nationalist Citizens' Party	429,226	8.55
Antonio Quirino	Liberal Party (Quirino wing) (Note: Quirino ran under his own wing of the Liberal Party, while the rest of the party supported Yulo's candidacy.)	60,328	1.20
Valentin de los Santos	Lapiang Malaya	21,674	0.43
Alfredo Abcede	Federal Party	470	0.01
Total		5,020,204	100.00
Valid votes		5,020,204	98.28
Invalid/blank votes		87,908	1.72
Total votes		5,108,112	100.00
Registered voters/turnout		6,763,897	75.52
Source: Nohlen, Grotz, Hartmann, Hasall and Santos

Popular vote
Garcia	41.28%
Yulo	27.62%
Manahan	20.90%
Recto	8.55%
Others	1.64%

==== Results by province and city ====
Province/City	Garcia		Yulo		Manahan		Recto		Quirino		De los Santos		Abcede	
Province/City	Votes	%	Votes	%	Votes	%	Votes	%	Votes	%	Votes	%	Votes	%
Abra	11,051	39.82	6,034	21.74	8,681	31.28	386	1.39	1,598	5.76	0	0.00	0	0.00
Agusan	22,827	58.83	9,280	23.92	5,765	14.86	924	2.38	6	0.02	0	0.00	0	0.00
Aklan	20,323	40.73	20,092	40.26	8,986	18.01	466	0.93	13	0.03	22	0.04	0	0.00
Albay	27,108	30.87	30,862	35.14	27,582	31.41	2,051	2.34	50	0.06	40	0.05	122	0.14
Antique	21,966	49.73	16,215	36.71	4,626	10.47	692	1.57	25	0.06	646	1.46	0	0.00
Bacolod	7,034	28.75	8,612	35.20	7,373	30.14	1,442	5.89	3	0.01	0	0.00	0	0.00
Baguio	2,170	20.35	4,559	42.75	2,694	25.26	580	5.44	658	6.17	2	0.02	1	0.01
Bataan	10,987	27.81	7,702	19.49	16,092	40.73	4,320	10.93	410	1.04	0	0.00	0	0.00
Batanes	1,268	38.53	819	24.89	1,145	34.79	39	1.19	3	0.09	17	0.52	0	0.00
Batangas	32,456	19.88	10,252	6.28	4,496	2.75	111,729	68.43	827	0.51	3,500	2.14	14	0.01
Bohol	98,057	76.18	30,274	23.52	263	0.20	119	0.09	8	0.01	0	0.00	0	0.00
Bukidnon	10,930	58.56	3,162	16.94	4,100	21.97	436	2.34	32	0.17	0	0.00	5	0.03
Bulacan	41,202	26.68	53,492	34.64	40,410	26.17	17,346	11.23	1,189	0.77	750	0.49	13	0.01
Butuan	12,858	58.31	4,750	21.54	3,906	17.71	518	2.35	18	0.08	0	0.00	1	0.00
Cabanatuan	3,082	26.42	2,876	24.65	4,151	35.59	1,501	12.87	55	0.47	0	0.00	0	0.00
Cagayan	29,736	43.95	12,634	18.67	19,953	29.49	1,813	2.68	3,529	5.22	0	0.00	0	0.00
Cagayan de Oro	5,833	45.41	1,047	8.15	4,001	31.15	1,863	14.50	101	0.79	1	0.01	0	0.00
Calbayog	8,543	57.85	6,160	41.71	29	0.20	30	0.20	5	0.03	0	0.00	0	0.00
Camarines Norte	10,317	28.77	11,480	32.02	11,003	30.69	2,885	8.05	59	0.16	113	0.32	0	0.00
Camarines Sur	34,630	30.64	42,269	37.40	30,364	26.87	5,409	4.79	350	0.31	0	0.00	0	0.00
Capiz	21,201	38.15	26,066	46.90	7,834	14.10	445	0.80	25	0.04	0	0.00	8	0.01
Catanduanes	11,585	42.89	9,694	35.89	5,527	20.46	202	0.75	2	0.01	3	0.01	0	0.00
Cavite	34,169	39.08	20,077	22.96	11,175	12.78	19,548	22.36	1,216	1.39	1,241	1.42	2	0.00
Cavite City	2,269	20.50	4,201	37.95	1,995	18.02	2,465	22.27	139	1.26	0	0.00	0	0.00
Cebu	186,088	69.28	27,896	10.39	47,509	17.69	7,087	2.64	26	0.01	0	0.00	0	0.00
Cebu City	22,485	49.34	9,908	21.74	11,904	26.12	1,260	2.76	14	0.03	0	0.00	0	0.00
Cotabato	62,343	54.26	26,335	22.92	21,980	19.13	3,320	2.89	914	0.80	0	0.00	0	0.00
Dagupan	6,513	39.31	7,843	47.34	1,855	11.20	313	1.89	43	0.26	0	0.00	0	0.00
Davao	64,552	74.22	11,083	12.74	9,053	10.41	2,107	2.42	183	0.21	0	0.00	0	0.00
Davao City	28,708	65.65	6,408	14.65	4,158	9.51	4,101	9.38	352	0.80	0	0.00	0	0.00
Dumaguete	3,686	51.17	2,014	27.96	1,263	17.53	239	3.32	1	0.01	0	0.00	0	0.00
Iligan City	6,906	65.40	1,931	18.29	1,478	14.00	241	2.28	4	0.04	0	0.00	0	0.00
Ilocos Norte	22,563	33.05	29,870	43.76	13,406	19.64	1,591	2.33	748	1.10	83	0.12	0	0.00
Ilocos Sur	23,398	27.61	19,986	23.58	20,138	23.76	2,162	2.55	19,026	22.45	28	0.03	3	0.00
Iloilo	60,319	33.09	53,627	29.42	64,249	35.25	4,049	2.22	27	0.01	0	0.00	0	0.00
Iloilo City	13,203	34.11	10,017	25.88	14,310	36.97	1,163	3.01	9	0.02	0	0.00	0	0.00
Isabela	20,039	36.74	12,010	22.02	17,895	32.81	2,354	4.32	1,063	1.95	1,156	2.12	19	0.03
La Union	14,951	23.17	23,542	36.48	20,173	31.26	732	1.13	5,130	7.95	0	0.00	0	0.00
Laguna	20,185	19.92	31,547	31.13	28,217	27.84	19,032	18.78	2,370	2.34	0	0.00	0	0.00
Lanao	40,119	61.48	20,797	31.87	3,930	6.02	392	0.60	19	0.03	0	0.00	0	0.00
Leyte	119,067	60.69	63,771	32.50	10,883	5.55	2,113	1.08	45	0.02	310	0.16	8	0.00
Manila	61,274	26.04	72,606	30.85	61,652	26.20	35,352	15.02	4,463	1.90	0	0.00	0	0.00
Marawi	3,880	59.63	2,345	36.04	266	4.09	11	0.17	5	0.08	0	0.00	0	0.00
Marinduque	7,776	28.93	3,380	12.58	11,336	42.18	4,302	16.01	41	0.15	41	0.15	0	0.00
Masbate	20,581	40.04	10,989	21.38	18,666	36.32	1,149	2.24	6	0.01	3	0.01	4	0.01
Misamis Occidental	24,964	61.50	11,811	29.10	2,929	7.22	878	2.16	7	0.02	0	0.00	0	0.00
Misamis Oriental	33,150	63.95	4,000	7.72	11,105	21.42	3,560	6.87	25	0.05	0	0.00	0	0.00
Mountain Province	12,521	23.83	13,696	26.07	24,619	46.86	1,260	2.40	443	0.84	0	0.00	0	0.00
Naga	2,301	26.12	2,629	29.84	2,854	32.40	924	10.49	92	1.04	7	0.08	2	0.02
Negros Occidental	73,312	47.45	51,511	33.34	25,348	16.41	4,321	2.80	14	0.01	0	0.00	0	0.00
Negros Oriental	45,263	57.71	24,841	31.67	7,790	9.93	520	0.66	6	0.01	0	0.00	7	0.01
Nueva Ecija	30,252	28.45	25,716	24.18	35,149	33.05	10,792	10.15	1,557	1.46	2,871	2.70	4	0.00
Nueva Vizcaya	6,442	29.16	3,599	16.29	11,129	50.37	604	2.73	320	1.45	0	0.00	0	0.00
Occidental Mindoro	8,077	46.18	5,669	32.41	1,663	9.51	1,926	11.01	146	0.83	8	0.05	0	0.00
Oriental Mindoro	14,008	33.26	7,269	17.26	8,010	19.02	12,680	30.10	154	0.37	0	0.00	0	0.00
Ormoc	8,539	71.34	2,935	24.52	267	2.23	223	1.86	1	0.01	4	0.03	0	0.00
Ozamiz	6,524	68.59	1,072	11.27	1,440	15.14	475	4.99	0	0.00	0	0.00	0	0.00
Palawan	13,568	52.41	9,056	34.98	2,870	11.09	380	1.47	12	0.05	0	0.00	0	0.00
Pampanga	17,560	14.27	58,091	47.19	34,904	28.36	11,474	9.32	561	0.46	504	0.41	0	0.00
Pangasinan	94,705	36.50	102,702	39.58	54,656	21.06	2,530	0.98	1,192	0.46	3,621	1.40	77	0.03
Pasay	7,164	26.13	9,172	33.46	6,548	23.89	3,914	14.28	386	1.41	226	0.82	4	0.01
Quezon	24,336	19.92	14,943	12.23	28,296	23.16	51,048	41.78	352	0.29	3,157	2.58	62	0.05
Quezon City	15,736	33.55	14,701	31.35	9,162	19.54	6,088	12.98	832	1.77	378	0.81	3	0.01
Rizal	52,244	27.13	59,042	30.66	50,604	26.28	25,140	13.06	3,541	1.84	1,951	1.01	27	0.01
Romblon	13,755	52.09	12,300	46.58	208	0.79	142	0.54	1	0.00	0	0.00	0	0.00
Roxas City	4,061	34.96	6,057	52.14	1,260	10.85	193	1.66	45	0.39	0	0.00	0	0.00
Samar	62,637	50.78	49,066	39.78	10,577	8.58	1,024	0.83	38	0.03	0	0.00	0	0.00
San Pablo	2,780	15.65	2,678	15.08	4,823	27.16	6,555	36.91	925	5.21	0	0.00	0	0.00
Silay	4,461	45.52	972	9.92	4,295	43.82	73	0.74	0	0.00	0	0.00	0	0.00
Sorsogon	28,837	40.85	24,464	34.66	16,522	23.41	607	0.86	57	0.08	72	0.10	29	0.04
Sulu	11,415	38.30	14,743	49.47	3,048	10.23	587	1.97	8	0.03	0	0.00	0	0.00
Surigao	49,475	70.58	11,872	16.94	6,820	9.73	1,919	2.74	7	0.01	0	0.00	0	0.00
Tacloban	6,731	56.62	3,856	32.44	972	8.18	321	2.70	8	0.07	0	0.00	0	0.00
Tagaytay	1,333	78.37	148	8.70	89	5.23	124	7.29	6	0.35	1	0.06	0	0.00
Tarlac	22,360	26.95	19,516	23.53	32,214	38.83	3,987	4.81	4,511	5.44	312	0.38	54	0.07
Trece Martires	198	64.08	28	9.06	51	16.50	32	10.36	0	0.00	0	0.00	0	0.00
Zambales	16,820	34.52	9,376	19.24	19,470	39.96	2,301	4.72	153	0.31	603	1.24	0	0.00
Zamboanga del Norte	26,564	75.29	5,299	15.02	2,856	8.10	537	1.52	21	0.06	3	0.01	1	0.00
Zamboanga del Sur	39,926	60.74	13,485	20.51	10,400	15.82	1,808	2.75	117	0.18	0	0.00	0	0.00
Total	2,072,257	41.28	1,386,829	27.62	1,049,420	20.90	429,226	8.55	60,328	1.20	21,674	0.43	470	0.01
Source: Commission on Elections

=== Vice-President ===
Candidate	Party	Votes	%
Diosdado Macapagal	Liberal Party	2,189,197	46.55
Jose Laurel Jr.	Nacionalista Party	1,783,012	37.92
Vicente Araneta	Progressive Party	375,090	7.98
Lorenzo Tañada	Nationalist Citizens' Party	344,685	7.33
Restituto Fresto	Lapiang Malaya	10,494	0.22
Total		4,702,478	100.00
Valid votes		4,702,478	92.06
Invalid/blank votes		405,634	7.94
Total votes		5,108,112	100.00
Registered voters/turnout		6,763,897	75.52
Source: Nohlen, Grotz, Hartmann, Hasall and Santos

Popular vote
Macapagal	46.55%
Laurel	37.92%
Araneta	7.98%
Tañada	7.33%
Fresto	0.22%

==== Results by province and city ====
Province/City	Macapagal		Laurel		Araneta		Tañada		Fresto	
Province/City	Votes	%	Votes	%	Votes	%	Votes	%	Votes	%
Abra	16,400	63.58	7,441	28.85	1,614	6.26	338	1.31	0	0.00
Agusan	13,458	37.81	19,481	54.74	1,858	5.22	794	2.23	0	0.00
Aklan	25,348	53.18	19,074	40.01	2,442	5.12	802	1.68	2	0.00
Albay	43,104	51.92	26,504	31.92	11,149	13.43	2,239	2.70	28	0.03
Antique	17,499	40.53	21,948	50.83	2,588	5.99	849	1.97	295	0.68
Bacolod	12,529	52.96	4,519	19.10	3,675	15.53	2,936	12.41	0	0.00
Baguio	7,884	68.25	1,480	12.81	773	6.69	1,413	12.23	2	0.02
Bataan	24,853	67.73	8,016	21.84	1,685	4.59	2,129	5.80	13	0.04
Batanes	1,233	44.53	1,194	43.12	304	10.98	37	1.34	1	0.04
Batangas	9,675	6.31	92,459	60.27	1,504	0.98	48,730	31.76	1,051	0.69
Bohol	37,205	29.46	88,037	69.71	776	0.61	275	0.22	0	0.00
Bukidnon	6,281	35.01	8,940	49.83	2,351	13.10	368	2.05	1	0.01
Bulacan	83,471	57.79	36,715	25.42	12,745	8.82	11,172	7.74	326	0.23
Butuan	7,582	36.78	11,264	54.65	1,256	6.09	510	2.47	0	0.00
Cabanatuan	6,294	55.86	2,971	26.37	1,218	10.81	785	6.97	0	0.00
Cagayan	30,659	48.21	22,649	35.61	8,023	12.62	2,267	3.56	0	0.00
Cagayan de Oro	3,901	31.47	3,571	28.81	3,003	24.22	1,922	15.50	0	0.00
Calbayog	6,181	42.36	8,351	57.23	40	0.27	20	0.14	0	0.00
Camarines Norte	19,118	55.45	9,962	28.89	3,086	8.95	2,265	6.57	48	0.14
Camarines Sur	56,063	51.83	34,624	32.01	12,892	11.92	4,578	4.23	0	0.00
Capiz	30,019	56.69	20,496	38.71	2,041	3.85	397	0.75	0	0.00
Catanduanes	10,868	41.64	12,161	46.60	2,687	10.30	383	1.47	0	0.00
Cavite	33,577	42.48	31,464	39.80	3,798	4.80	9,792	12.39	416	0.53
Cavite City	5,822	54.49	1,994	18.66	828	7.75	2,041	19.10	0	0.00
Cebu	71,074	36.44	99,384	50.96	21,268	10.90	3,310	1.70	0	0.00
Cebu City	28,080	63.32	7,831	17.66	6,045	13.63	2,386	5.38	1	0.00
Cotabato	44,673	41.38	52,039	48.20	9,077	8.41	2,180	2.02	0	0.00
Dagupan	9,655	58.85	5,916	36.06	566	3.45	270	1.65	0	0.00
Davao	23,367	27.47	56,906	66.89	3,432	4.03	1,374	1.61	0	0.00
Davao City	13,654	32.06	25,608	60.12	1,610	3.78	1,723	4.05	0	0.00
Dumaguete	3,105	44.29	2,986	42.60	643	9.17	276	3.94	0	0.00
Iligan	3,162	30.81	4,927	48.01	1,791	17.45	383	3.73	0	0.00
Ilocos Norte	43,588	65.19	18,379	27.49	3,523	5.27	1,335	2.00	38	0.06
Ilocos Sur	53,785	66.46	17,783	21.97	7,184	8.88	2,163	2.67	14	0.02
Iloilo	77,382	45.65	56,807	33.51	26,942	15.89	8,383	4.95	0	0.00
Iloilo City	14,980	40.15	13,309	35.67	7,077	18.97	1,942	5.21	0	0.00
Isabela	27,640	52.64	15,734	29.96	6,883	13.11	1,797	3.42	457	0.87
La Union	45,465	71.76	13,913	21.96	3,260	5.15	721	1.14	0	0.00
Laguna	38,274	41.36	29,602	31.99	10,255	11.08	14,151	15.29	249	0.27
Lanao	22,605	41.27	28,926	52.81	2,971	5.42	271	0.49	0	0.00
Leyte	75,326	40.04	105,248	55.94	5,102	2.71	2,258	1.20	194	0.10
Manila	144,225	61.27	43,557	18.50	17,581	7.47	30,044	12.76	0	0.00
Marawi	2,222	39.20	3,328	58.72	98	1.73	20	0.35	0	0.00
Marinduque	6,461	26.02	11,628	46.84	4,285	17.26	2,433	9.80	20	0.08
Masbate	20,545	44.36	18,980	40.98	5,803	12.53	981	2.12	2	0.00
Misamis Occidental	17,146	44.34	19,174	49.59	1,490	3.85	857	2.22	0	0.00
Misamis Oriental	10,229	21.78	22,344	47.58	9,940	21.17	4,444	9.46	0	0.00
Mountain Province	26,163	56.57	11,364	24.57	7,618	16.47	1,102	2.38	0	0.00
Naga	4,683	55.02	1,946	22.86	1,157	13.59	720	8.46	5	0.06
Negros Occidental	62,700	42.81	58,753	40.11	14,924	10.19	10,086	6.89	0	0.00
Negros Oriental	31,041	37.19	40,270	48.25	3,131	3.75	9,023	10.81	2	0.00
Nueva Ecija	55,851	56.19	26,241	26.40	10,603	10.67	5,241	5.27	1,458	1.47
Nueva Vizcaya	12,816	58.56	4,753	21.72	4,035	18.44	282	1.29	0	0.00
Occidental Mindoro	7,561	46.06	7,715	46.99	477	2.91	664	4.04	0	0.00
Oriental Mindoro	12,412	31.81	18,247	46.76	2,597	6.66	5,766	14.78	0	0.00
Ormoc	3,391	28.99	7,774	66.46	181	1.55	351	3.00	0	0.00
Ozamiz	3,219	35.99	4,110	45.96	1,167	13.05	447	5.00	0	0.00
Palawan	11,812	47.03	12,301	48.97	792	3.15	212	0.84	0	0.00
Pampanga	104,581	87.67	8,777	7.36	3,939	3.30	1,991	1.67	0	0.00
Pangasinan	150,194	58.80	84,695	33.15	16,016	6.27	2,297	0.90	2,250	0.88
Pasay	15,670	57.85	5,714	21.09	1,966	7.26	3,562	13.15	176	0.65
Quezon	13,554	11.55	20,340	17.33	5,024	4.28	76,694	65.35	1,743	1.49
Quezon City	26,394	57.04	10,832	23.41	3,093	6.68	5,682	12.28	268	0.58
Rizal	98,105	53.46	44,040	24.00	19,677	10.72	20,691	11.28	992	0.54
Romblon	12,846	49.04	13,186	50.34	65	0.25	99	0.38	0	0.00
Roxas City	6,931	61.93	3,799	33.95	240	2.14	221	1.97	0	0.00
Samar	20,884	23.78	56,820	64.69	9,124	10.39	1,012	1.15	0	0.00
San Pablo	4,177	25.38	4,822	29.30	1,371	8.33	6,089	36.99	0	0.00
Silay	2,313	25.74	3,187	35.46	2,767	30.79	720	8.01	0	0.00
Sorsogon	33,121	49.12	28,204	41.83	5,342	7.92	711	1.05	46	0.07
Sulu	15,133	58.55	9,121	35.29	1,115	4.31	479	1.85	0	0.00
Surigao	23,749	35.24	37,344	55.41	3,425	5.08	2,877	4.27	1	0.00
Tacloban	4,939	42.20	6,061	51.78	507	4.33	198	1.69	0	0.00
Tagaytay	252	15.39	1,364	83.32	0	0.00	21	1.28	0	0.00
Tarlac	57,353	70.90	16,456	20.34	5,646	6.98	1,286	1.59	156	0.19
Trece Martires	50	20.33	187	76.02	6	2.44	3	1.22	0	0.00
Zambales	27,841	59.95	12,635	27.20	4,424	9.53	1,306	2.81	238	0.51
Zamboanga del Norte	10,614	31.46	21,542	63.85	818	2.42	765	2.27	1	0.00
Zamboanga del Sur	23,180	36.73	30,798	48.81	4,681	7.42	4,442	7.04	0	0.00
Total	2,189,197	46.55	1,783,012	37.92	375,090	7.98	344,685	7.33	10,494	0.22
Source: Commission on Elections

== See also ==
- Commission on Elections
- Politics of the Philippines
- Philippine elections
- President of the Philippines
- 4th Congress of the Philippines
