= 1965 Philippine general election =

- November 9, 1965
- Presidential election
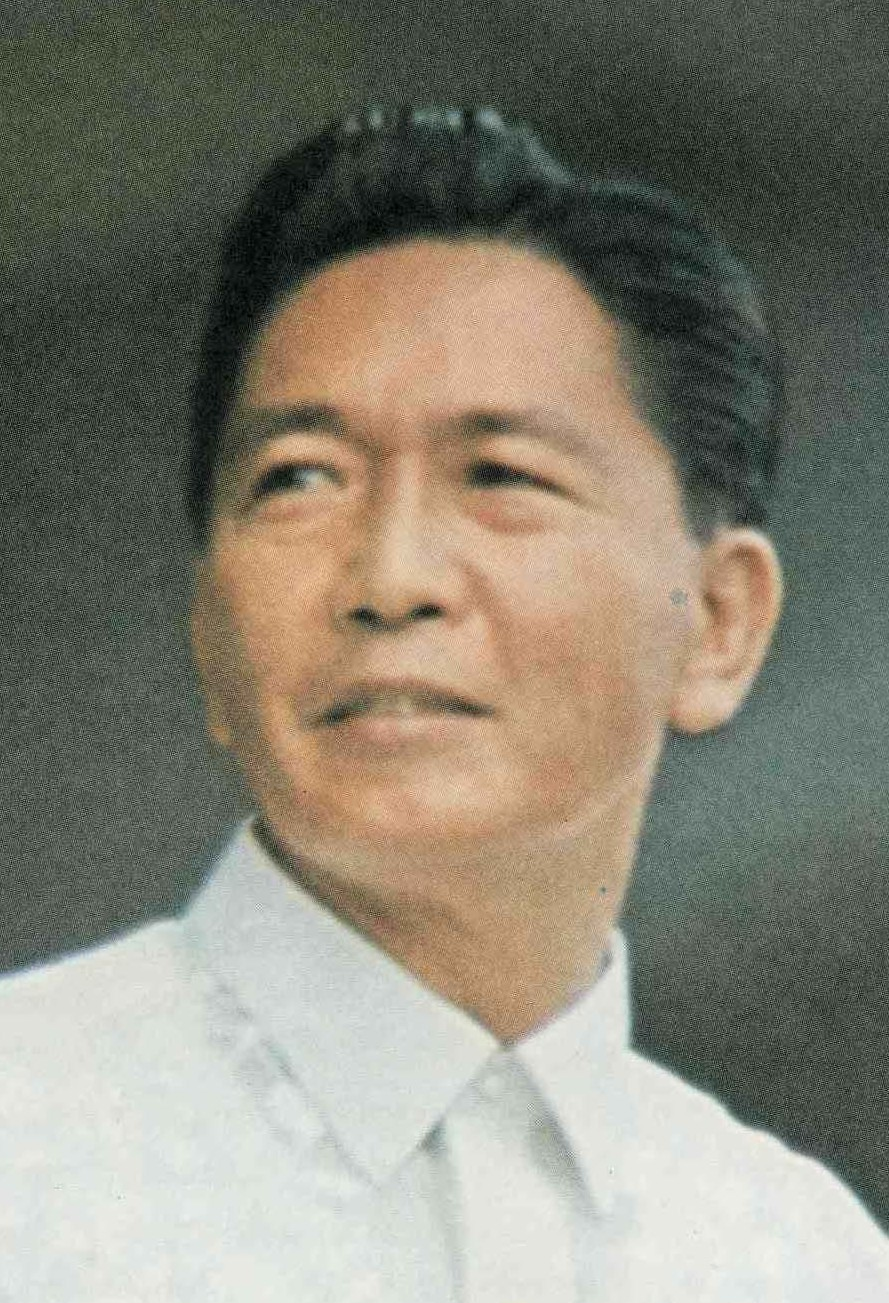

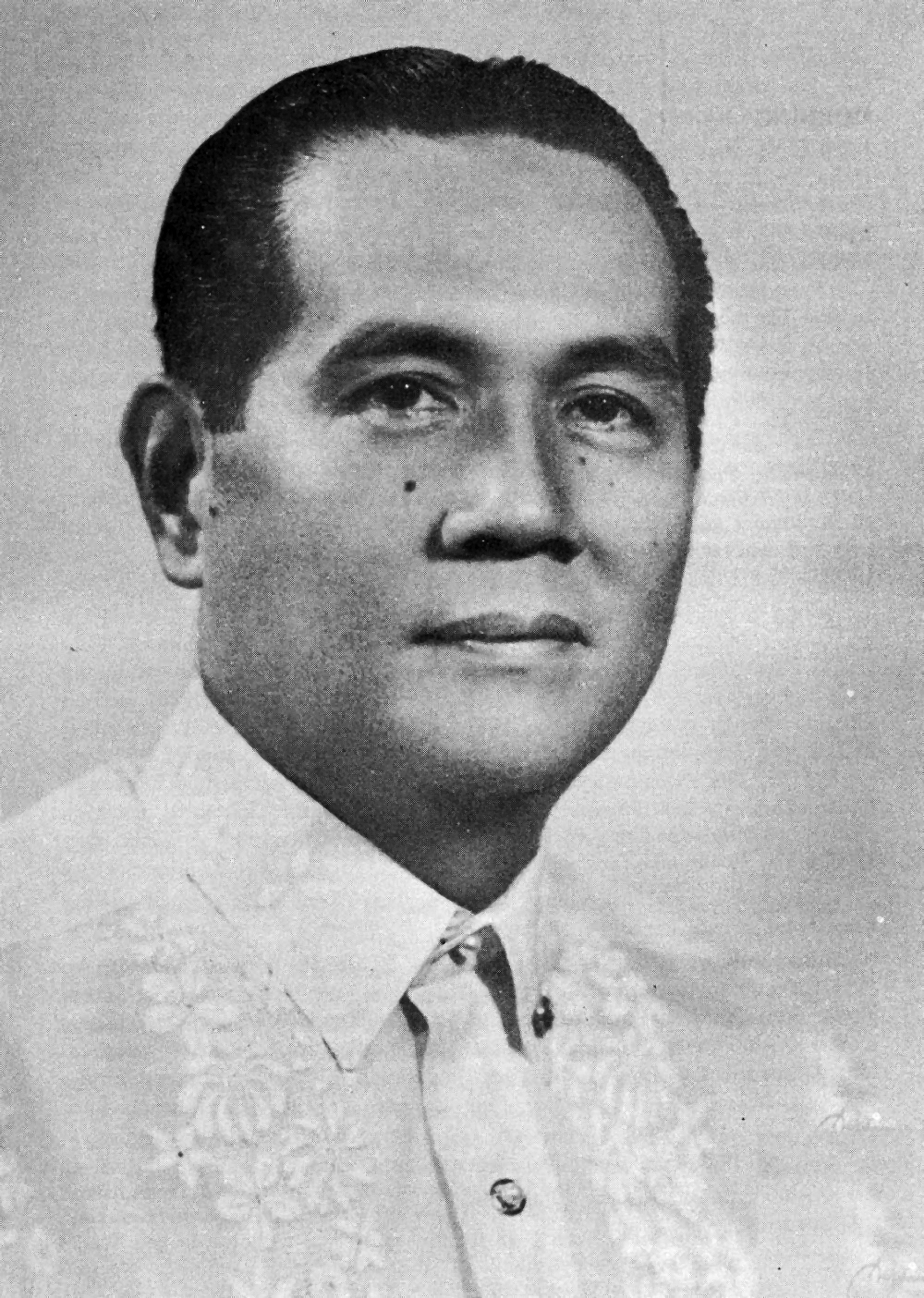

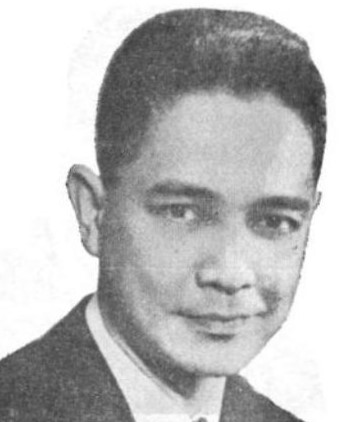
| Candidate | Ferdinand Marcos | Diosdado Macapagal | Raul Manglapus |
| Party | Nacionalista | Liberal | Progressive |
| Running mate | Fernando Lopez | Gerry Roxas | Manuel Manahan |
| Popular vote | 3,861,324 | 3,187,752 | 384,564 |
| Percentage | 51.94% | 42.88% | 5.17% |
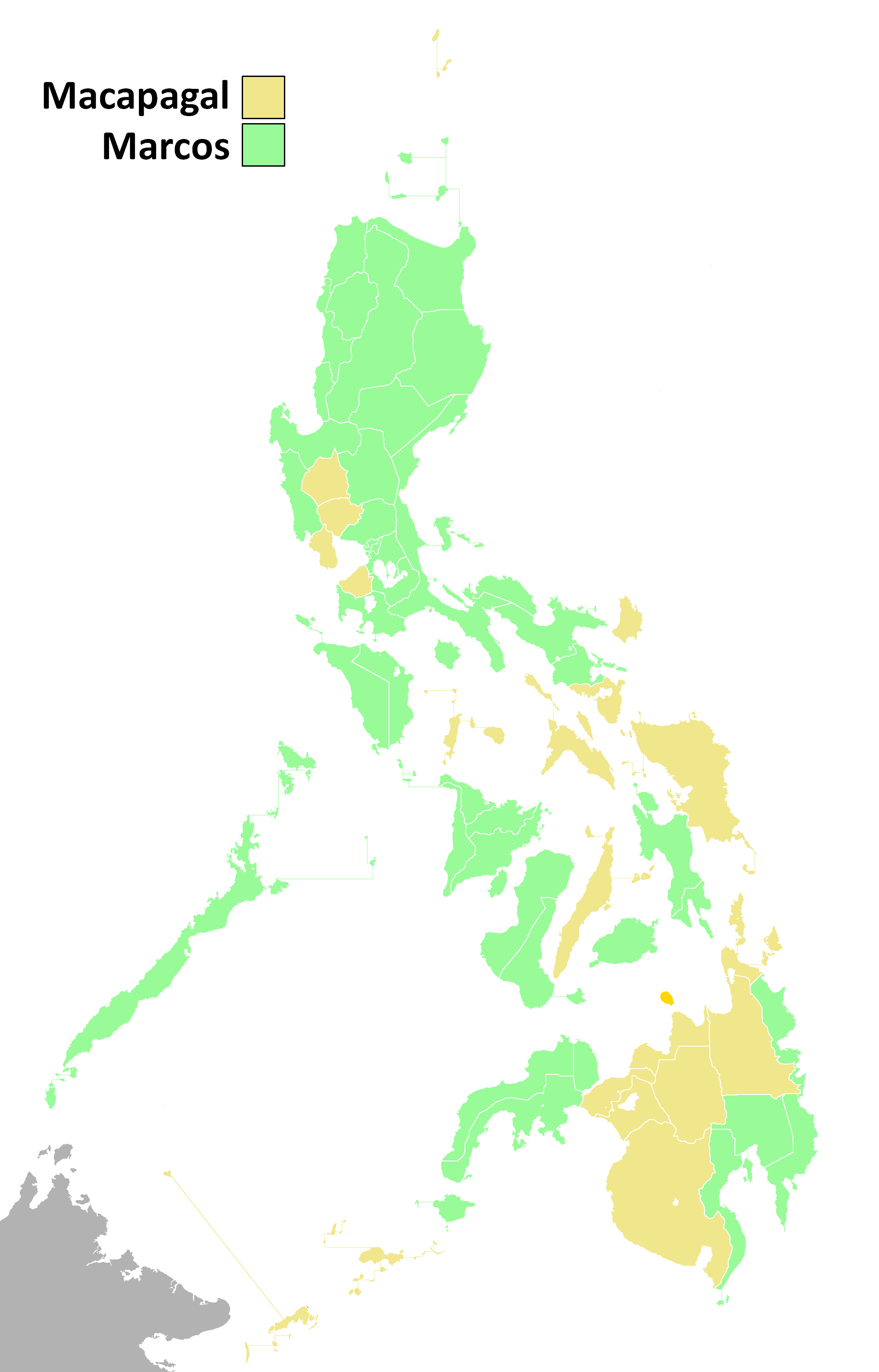
- Election results per province/city.
President before election
Diosdado Macapagal
Liberal
Elected President
Ferdinand E. Marcos
Nacionalista
- Vice presidential election
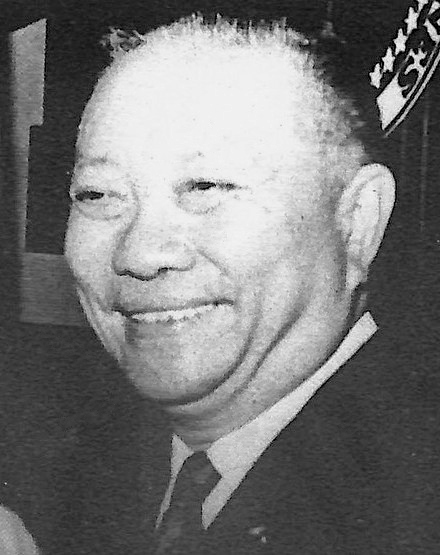

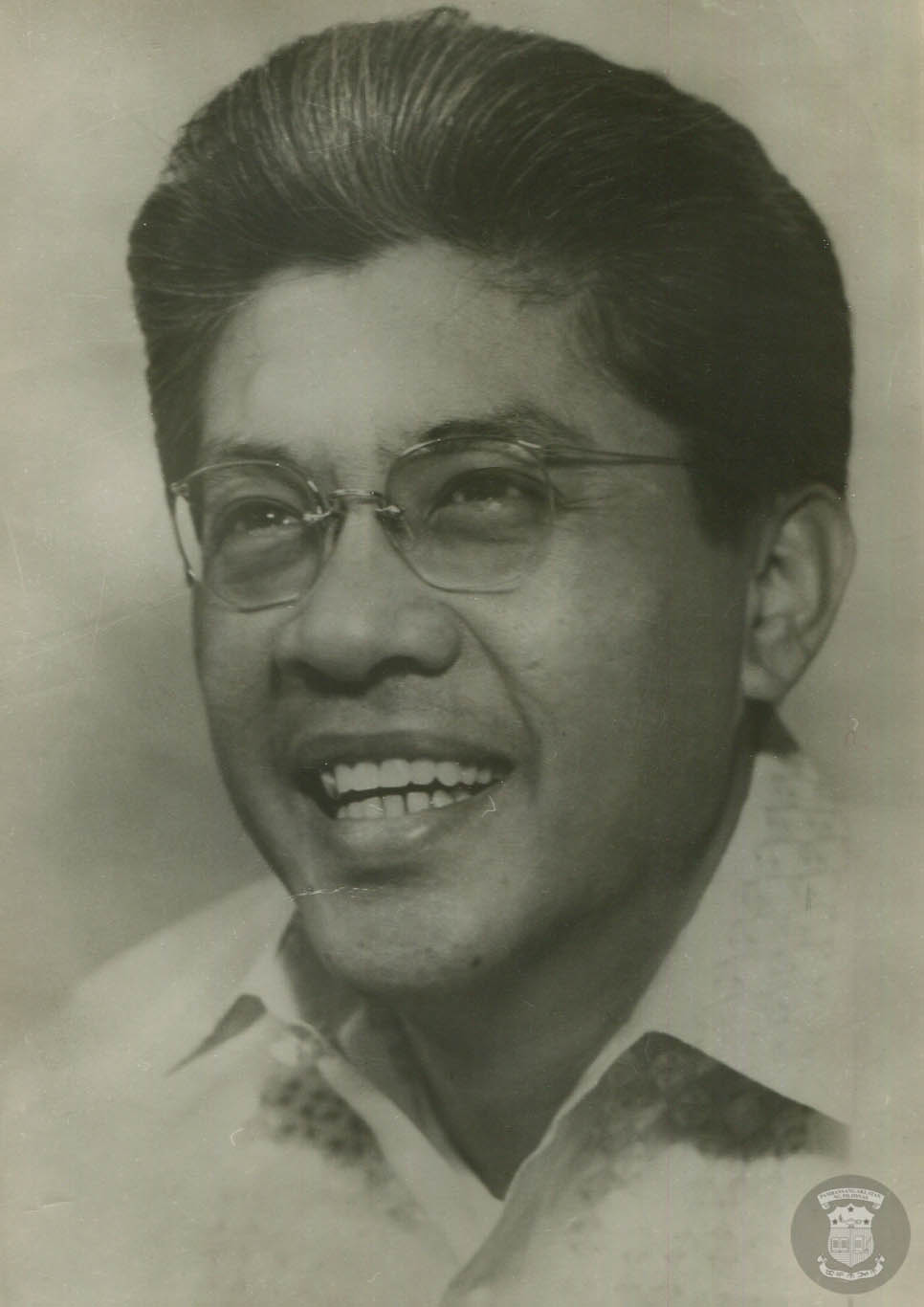

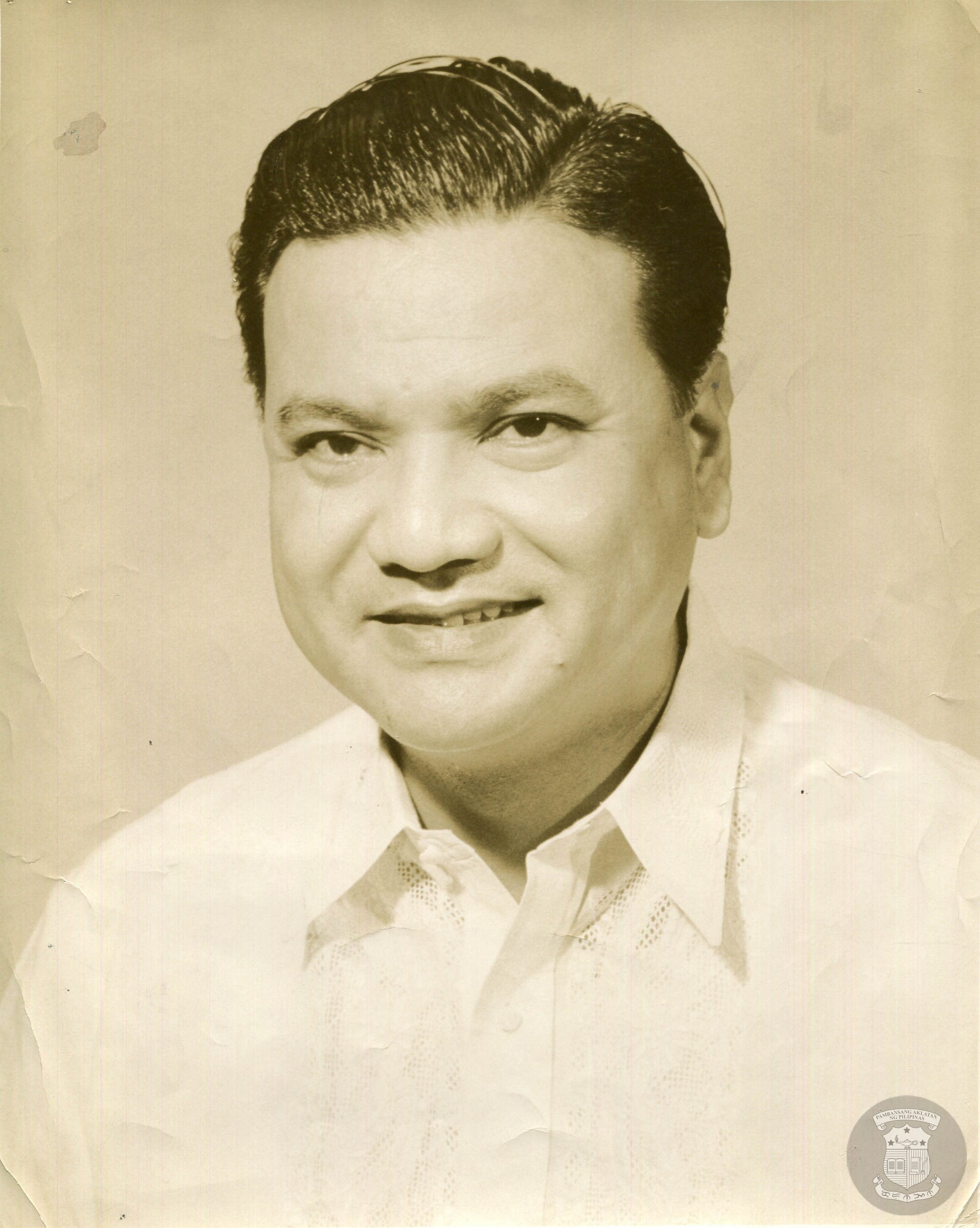
| Candidate | Fernando Lopez | Gerry Roxas | Manuel Manahan |
| Party | Nacionalista | Liberal | Progressive |
| Popular vote | 3,531,550 | 3,504,826 | 247,426 |
| Percentage | 48.48% | 48.11% | 3.40% |
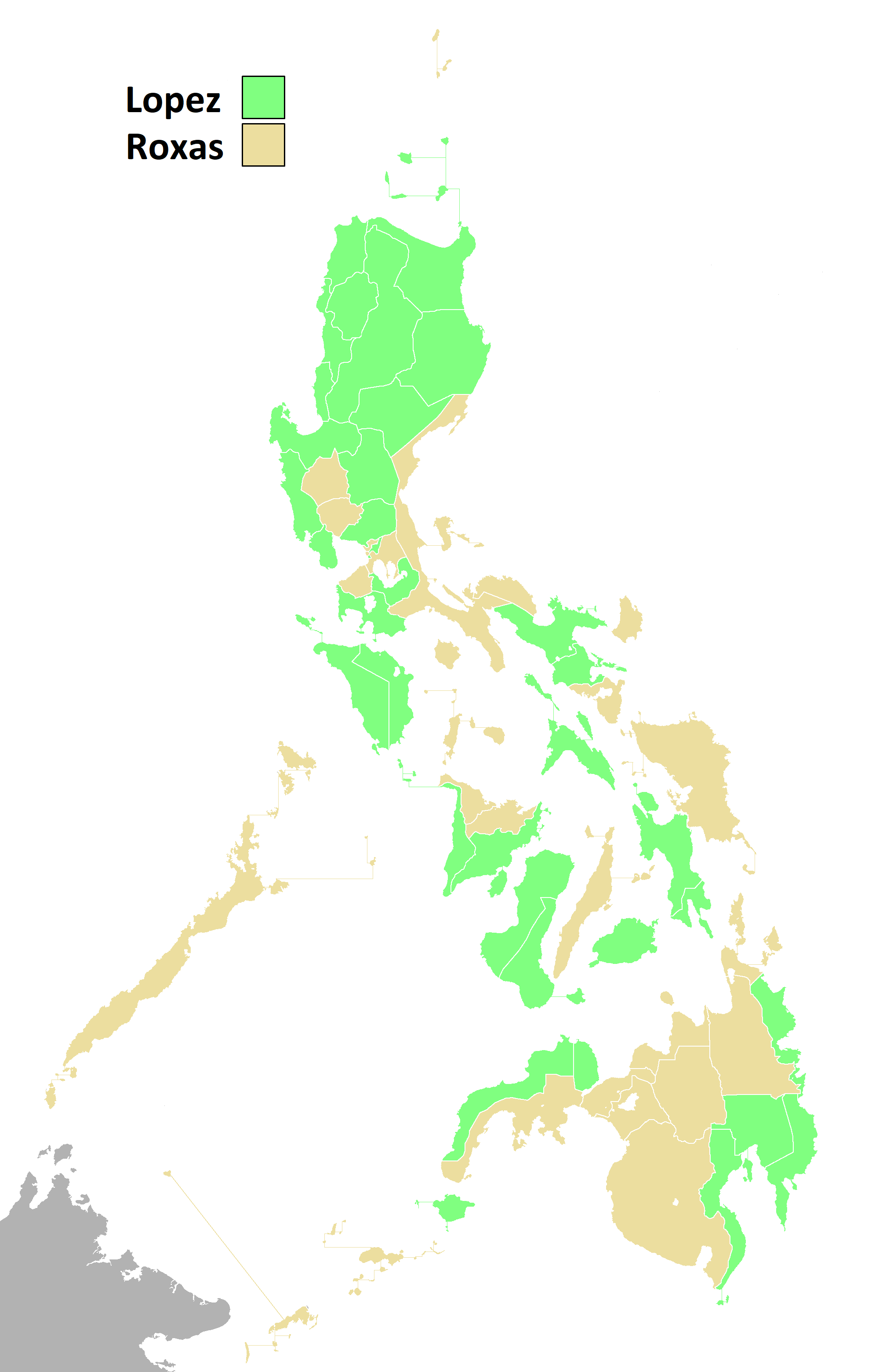
- Election results per province/city.
Vice President before election
Emmanuel Pelaez
Nacionalista
Elected Vice President
Fernando Lopez
Nacionalista
- Senate election

8 of the 24 seats in the Philippine Senate 13 needs for a majority
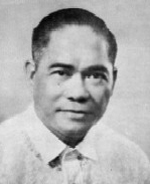

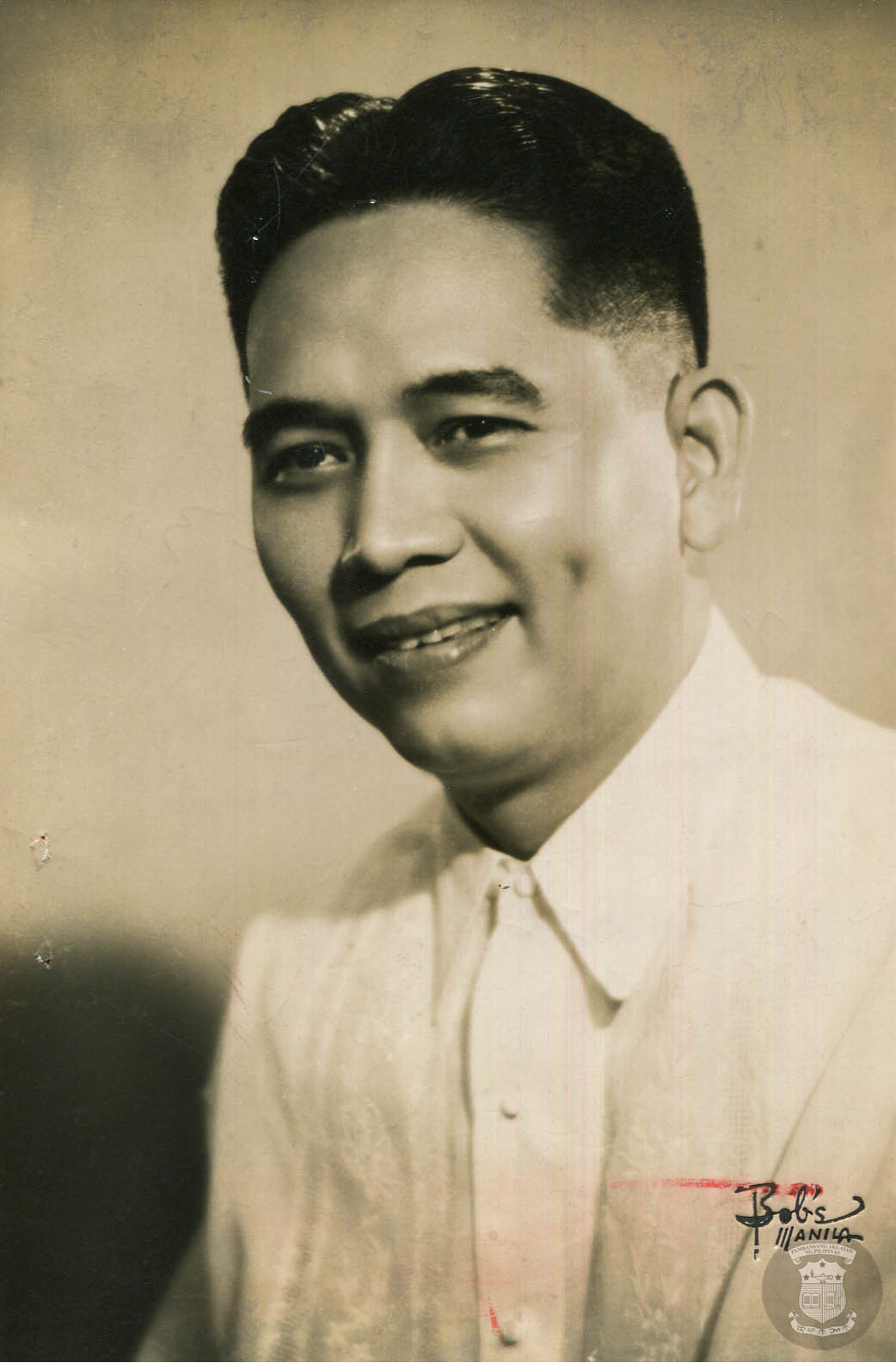

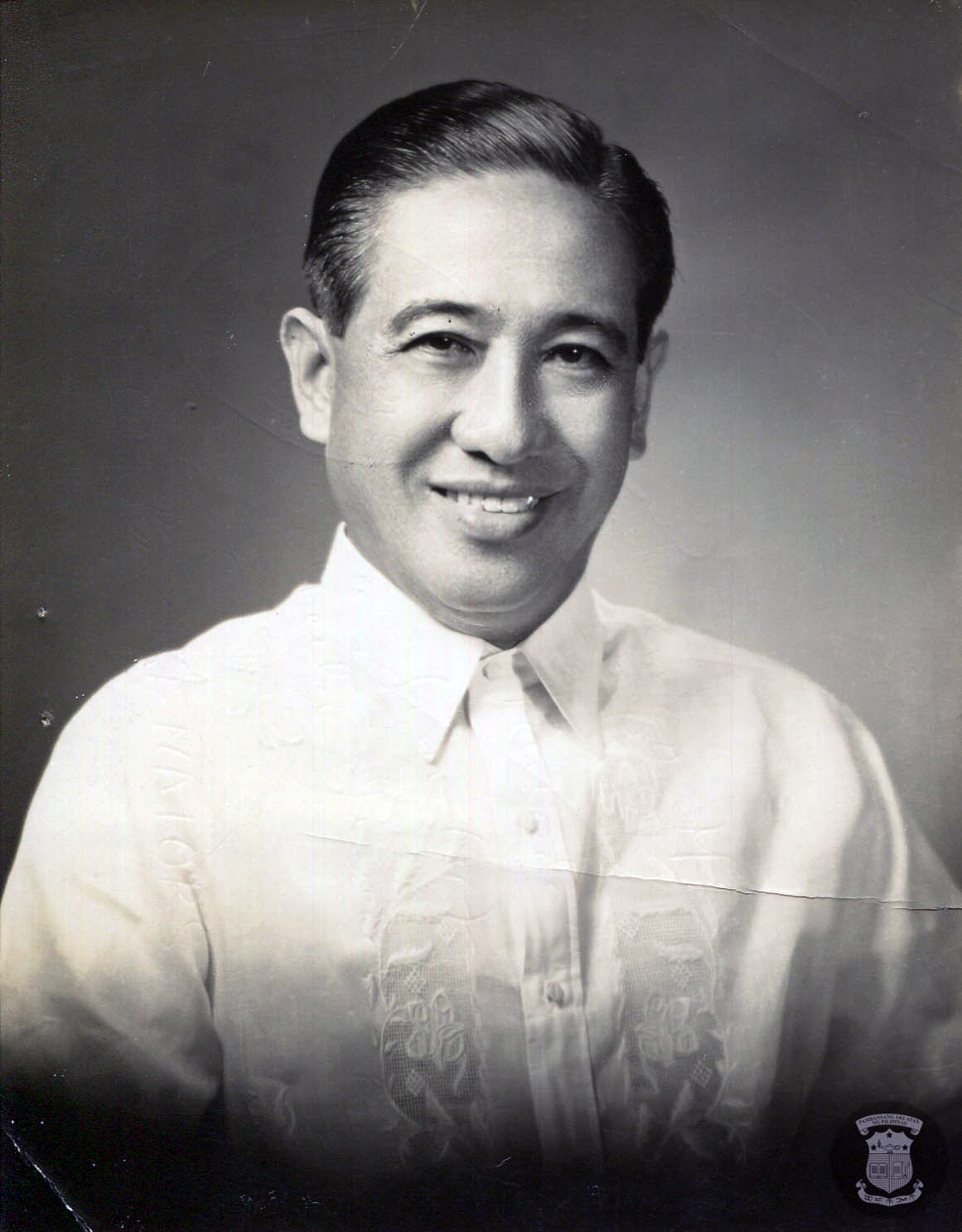
| | First party | Second party | Third party |
|---|---|---|---|
| Leader | Arturo Tolentino | Ambrosio Padilla | Lorenzo Tañada |
| Party | Nacionalista | Liberal | NCP |
| Seats before | 10 (4 up) | 9 (1 up) | 1 (1 up) |
| Seats won | 5 | 2 | 1 |
| Seats after | 11 | 10 | 1 |
| Seat change | ▲1 | ▲3 | 0 |
| Popular vote | 21,619,502 | 23,158,197 | 3,014,618 |
| Percentage | 43.80 | 46.92 | 6.11 |
| Swing | ▼6.36 | ▼2.83 | ▲6.11 |
Senate President before election
Ferdinand Marcos
Nacionalista
Elected Senate President
Arturo Tolentino
Nacionalista
- House elections

All 104 seats in the House of Representatives of the Philippines 53 seats needed for a majority
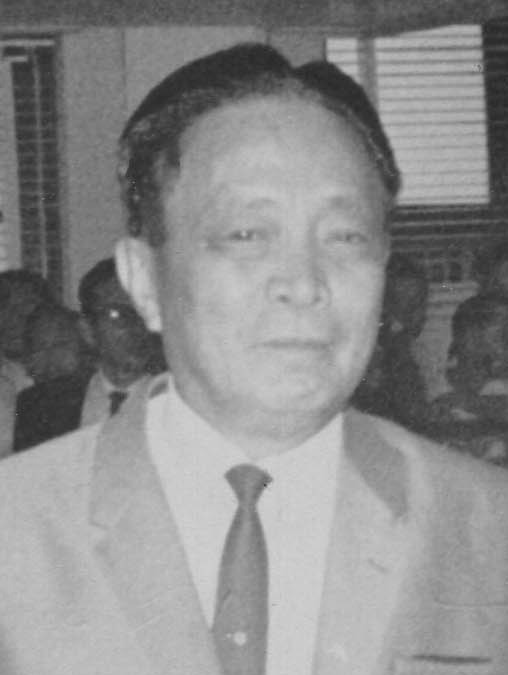

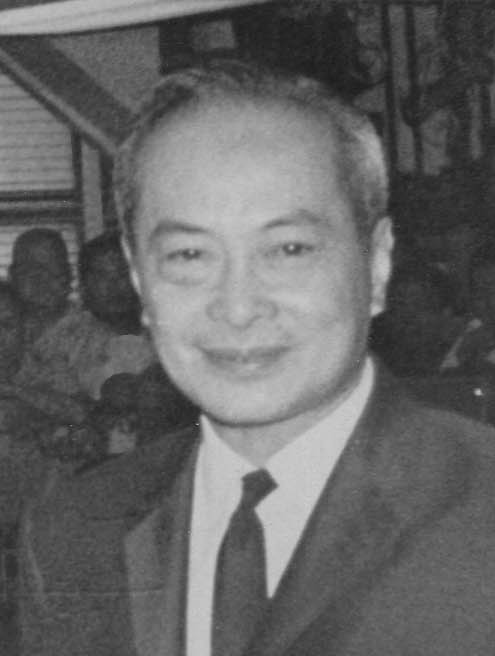
| | Majority party | Minority party |
|---|---|---|
| Leader | Cornelio Villareal | José Laurel, Jr. |
| Party | Liberal | Nacionalista |
| Leader's seat | Capiz–2nd | Batangas–3rd |
| Last election | 29 seats, 33.71% | 74 seats, 61.02% |
| Seats won | 61 | 38 |
| Seat change | ▲32 | ▼36 |
| Popular vote | 3,721,460 | 3,028,224 |
| Percentage | 51.32 | 41.76 |
| Swing | ▲17.61 | ▼19.26 |
Speaker before election
Cornelio Villareal
Liberal
Elected Speaker
Cornelio Villareal
Liberal

Presidential, legislative and local elections were held in the Philippines on November 9, 1965. Incumbent President Diosdado Macapagal lost his opportunity to get a second full term as President of the Philippines to Senate President Ferdinand Marcos. His running mate, Senator Gerardo Roxas lost to former Vice President Fernando Lopez. Emmanuel Pelaez did not run for vice president. An unprecedented twelve candidates ran for president; however, nine of those were nuisance candidates.

== Results ==
=== President ===
| Candidate | Party | Votes | % |
|---|---|---|---|
| Ferdinand Marcos | Nacionalista Party | 3,861,324 | 51.94 |
| Diosdado Macapagal (incumbent) | Liberal Party | 3,187,752 | 42.88 |
| Raul Manglapus | Party for Philippine Progress | 384,564 | 5.17 |
| Gaudencio Bueno | New Leaf Party | 199 | 0.00 |
| Aniceto A. Hidalgo | New Leaf Party | 156 | 0.00 |
| Segundo Baldovi | Partido ng Bansa | 139 | 0.00 |
| Nic V. Garces | People’s Progressive Democratic Party | 130 | 0.00 |
| German F. Villanueva | Independent | 106 | 0.00 |
| Guillermo M. Mercado | Laborer Party | 27 | 0.00 |
| Antonio Nicolas Jr. | Allied Party | 27 | 0.00 |
| Blandino P. Ruan | Independent | 6 | 0.00 |
| Praxedes Floro | Independent | 1 | 0.00 |
| Total | | 7,434,431 | 100.00 |
| Valid votes | | 7,434,431 | 97.69 |
| Invalid/blank votes | | 175,620 | 2.31 |
| Total votes | | 7,610,051 | 100.00 |
| Registered voters/turnout | | 9,962,345 | 76.39 |
Source: Nohlen, Grotz, Hartmann, Hasall and Santos

=== Vice-President ===
| Candidate | Party | Votes | % |
|---|---|---|---|
| Fernando Lopez | Nacionalista Party | 3,531,550 | 48.48 |
| Gerry Roxas | Liberal Party | 3,504,826 | 48.11 |
| Manuel Manahan | Party for Philippine Progress | 247,426 | 3.40 |
| Gonzalo D. Vasquez | Reformist Party of the Philippines | 644 | 0.01 |
| Severo Capales | New Leaf Party | 193 | 0.00 |
| Eleodoro Salvador | Partido ng Bansa | 172 | 0.00 |
| Total | | 7,284,811 | 100.00 |
| Valid votes | | 7,284,811 | 95.73 |
| Invalid/blank votes | | 325,240 | 4.27 |
| Total votes | | 7,610,051 | 100.00 |
| Registered voters/turnout | | 9,962,345 | 76.39 |
Source: Nohlen, Grotz, Hartmann, Hasall and Santos

=== Senate ===
Representation of results; seats contested are inside the box. Nacionalista Party Liberal Party Progressive Party Nationalist Citizens' Party

| Candidate | Party | Votes | % |
|---|---|---|---|
| Jovito Salonga | Liberal Party | 3,629,834 | 47.70 |
| Alejandro Almendras | Nacionalista Party | 3,472,689 | 45.63 |
| Genaro Magsaysay | Nacionalista Party | 3,463,459 | 45.51 |
| Sergio Osmeña Jr. | Liberal Party | 3,234,966 | 42.51 |
| Eva Estrada-Kalaw | Nacionalista Party | 3,190,700 | 41.93 |
| Dominador Aytona | Nacionalista Party | 3,037,666 | 39.92 |
| Lorenzo Tañada | Nationalist Citizens' Party | 3,014,618 | 39.61 |
| Wenceslao Lagumbay | Nacionalista Party | 2,972,525 | 39.06 |
| Cesar Climaco | Liberal Party | 2,968,958 | 39.01 |
| Estanislao Fernandez | Liberal Party | 2,846,320 | 37.40 |
| Constancio Castañeda | Nacionalista Party | 2,814,032 | 36.98 |
| Ramon Bagatsing | Liberal Party | 2,774,621 | 36.46 |
| Bartolome Cabangbang | Nacionalista Party | 2,668,431 | 35.06 |
| Alejandro Roces | Liberal Party | 2,663,852 | 35.00 |
| Ramon Diaz | Liberal Party | 2,620,073 | 34.43 |
| Lucas Paredes | Liberal Party | 2,419,573 | 31.79 |
| Vicente Araneta | Party for Philippine Progress | 500,795 | 6.58 |
| Amelio Mutuc | Independent | 413,074 | 5.43 |
| Jose Feria | Party for Philippine Progress | 335,119 | 4.40 |
| Benjamin Gaston | Party for Philippine Progress | 149,057 | 1.96 |
| Dionisio Ojeda | Party for Philippine Progress | 143,681 | 1.89 |
| Magdaleno Estrada | New Leaf Party | 8,766 | 0.12 |
| Epifanio Talania | Partido ng Bansa | 3,007 | 0.04 |
| Vicente Baldovino | Partido ng Bansa | 1,945 | 0.03 |
| German Carbonel | Partido ng Bansa | 1,830 | 0.02 |
| Toribia S. Valino | Partido ng Bansa | 1,750 | 0.02 |
| Jose Villavisa | Partido ng Bansa | 1,604 | 0.02 |
| Teodoro Gosuico Sr. | Partido ng Bansa | 1,153 | 0.02 |
| Genovevo Baynosa | New Leaf Party | 1,101 | 0.01 |
| Leoncio Wico Pagdanganan | Partido ng Bansa | 113 | 0.00 |
| Total | | 49,355,312 | 100.00 |
| Total votes | | 7,610,051 | – |
| Registered voters/turnout | | 9,962,345 | 76.39 |

=== House of Representatives ===
| Party | Votes | % | +/– | Seats | +/– |
|---|---|---|---|---|---|
| Liberal Party | 3,721,460 | 51.32 | +17.61 | 61 | +32 |
| Nacionalista Party | 3,028,224 | 41.76 | −19.26 | 38 | −36 |
| Liberal Party (independent) | 107,001 | 1.48 | +0.74 | 1 | New |
| Nacionalista Party (independent) | 71,955 | 0.99 | +0.36 | 1 | New |
| Party for Philippine Progress | 41,983 | 0.58 | +0.58 | 0 | 0 |
| Young Philippines | 12,479 | 0.17 | New | 0 | 0 |
| Republican Party | 85 | 0.00 | New | 0 | 0 |
| Independent | 268,327 | 3.70 | −0.08 | 3 | +2 |
| Total | 7,251,514 | 100.00 | – | 104 | 0 |
| Valid votes | 7,251,514 | 95.29 | −0.12 | | |
| Invalid/blank votes | 358,537 | 4.71 | +0.12 | | |
| Total votes | 7,610,051 | 100.00 | – | | |
| Registered voters/turnout | 9,962,345 | 76.39 | −3.04 | | |
Source: Nohlen, Grotz and Hartmann and Teehankee

== Local plebiscites ==
Aside from the general election, local plebiscites were also held on this day. One was for the division of the province of Samar into three provinces, namely Eastern Samar, Northern Samar and Western Samar (renamed in 1969 as "Samar"). Six were for conversion of municipalities into cities, with two being renamed as well. All were carried, except for the cityhood of Batangas and renaming it to "Laurel City".

| Location | Plebiscite question | For | | Against | | Total |
| Location | Plebiscite question | Total | % | Total | % | Total |
|---|---|---|---|---|---|---|
| Samar | Division of Samar to three provinces | 135,259 | 89.42% | 16,002 | 10.58% | 151,261 |
| La Carlota, Negros Occidental | Cityhood of La Carlota | 5,622 | 73.96% | 1,979 | 26.04% | 7,601 |
| Bago, Negros Occidental | Cityhood of Bago | 8,002 | 82.38% | 1,711 | 17.62% | 9,713 |
| Laoag, Ilocos Norte | Cityhood of Laoag | 7,831 | 50.92% | 7,549 | 49.08% | 15,380 |
| San Carlos, Pangasinan | Cityhood of San Carlos | 8,941 | 66.26% | 4,552 | 33.74% | 13,493 |
| General Santos, Cotabato | Cityhood and renaming to "Rajah Buayan" | 4,422 | 59.05% | 3,066 | 40.95% | 7,488 |
| Batangas, Batangas | Cityhood and renaming to "Laurel City" | 9,901 | 41.35% | 14,044 | 58.65% | 23,945 |

In Leyva vs. COMELEC, the Supreme Court reversed COMELEC's proclamation of the cityhood of Rajah Buayan being approved, as it ruled that its implementing law decreed that the majority of the votes must be taken into account all of the registered voters, and not just those who voted. As the votes for cityhood were less than the majority of all voters, the Rajah Buayan's cityhood was nullified, and it reverted as the municipality of General Santos.

== See also ==
- Commission on Elections
- Politics of the Philippines
- Philippine elections
- 6th Congress of the Philippines
