= 1961 Philippine general election =

- November 14, 1961
- Presidential election
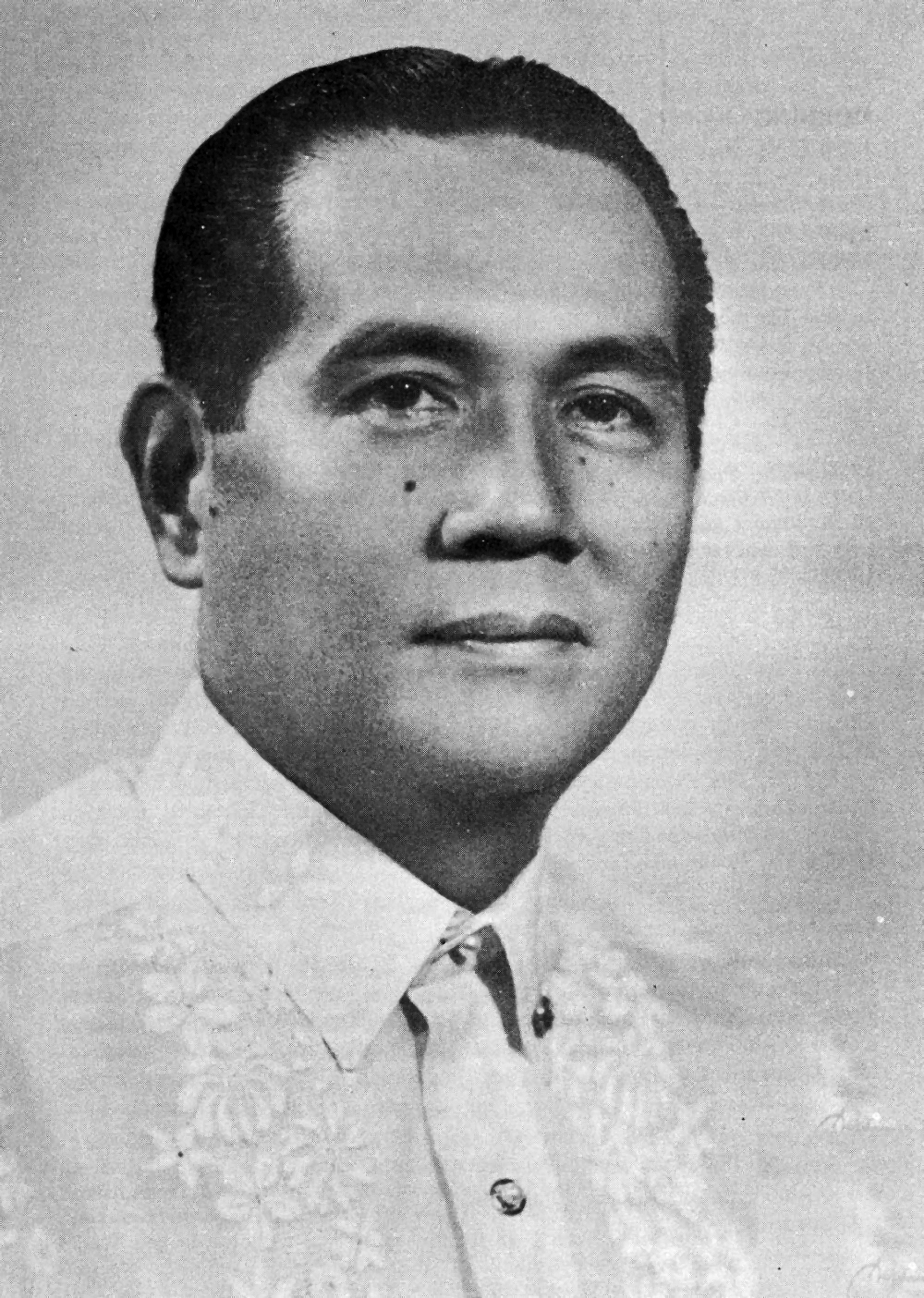

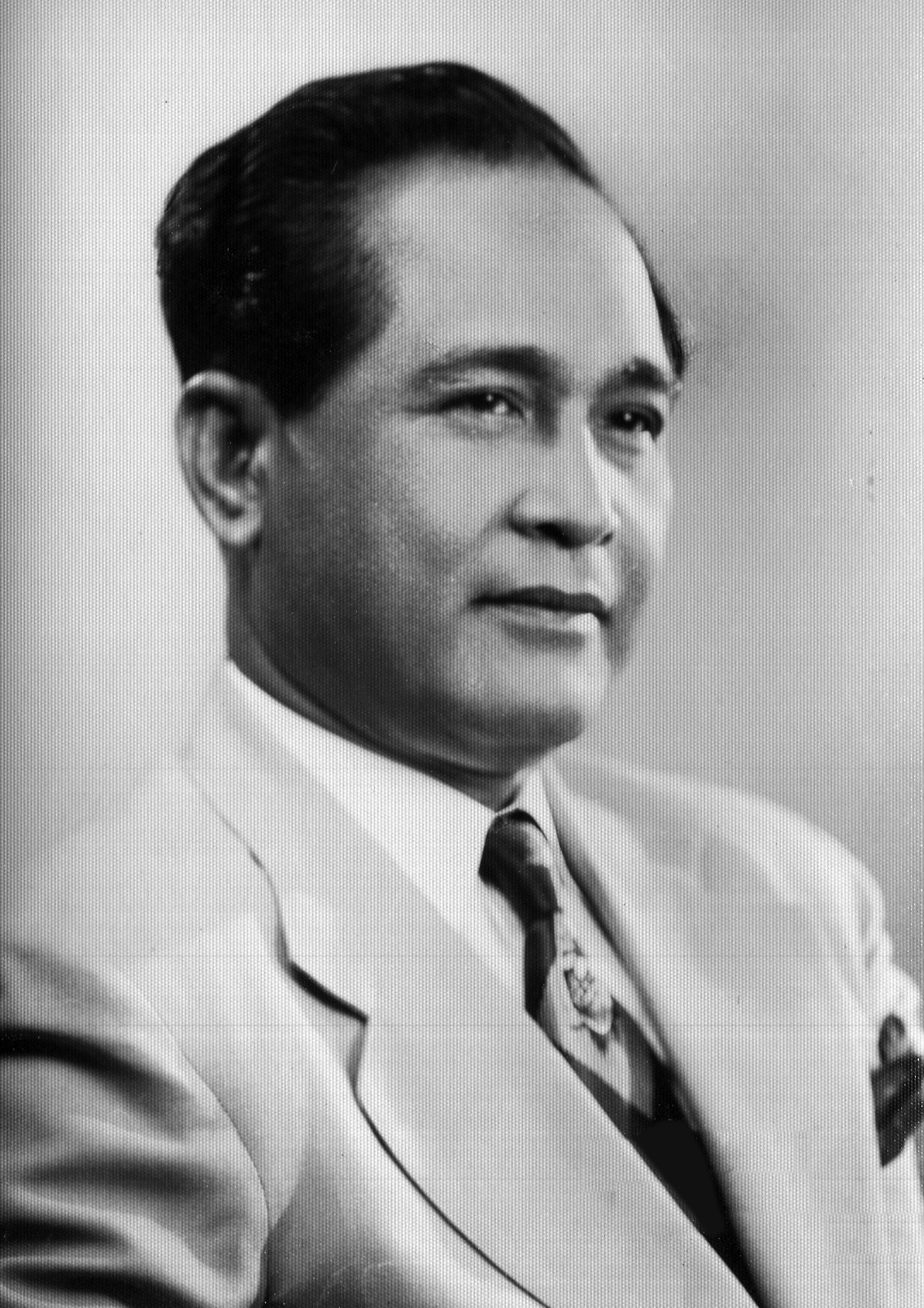
Nominee	Diosdado Macapagal	Carlos P. Garcia
Party	Liberal	Nacionalista
Running mate	Emmanuel Pelaez	Gil J. Puyat
Popular vote	3,554,840	2,902,996
Percentage	55.05%	44.95%
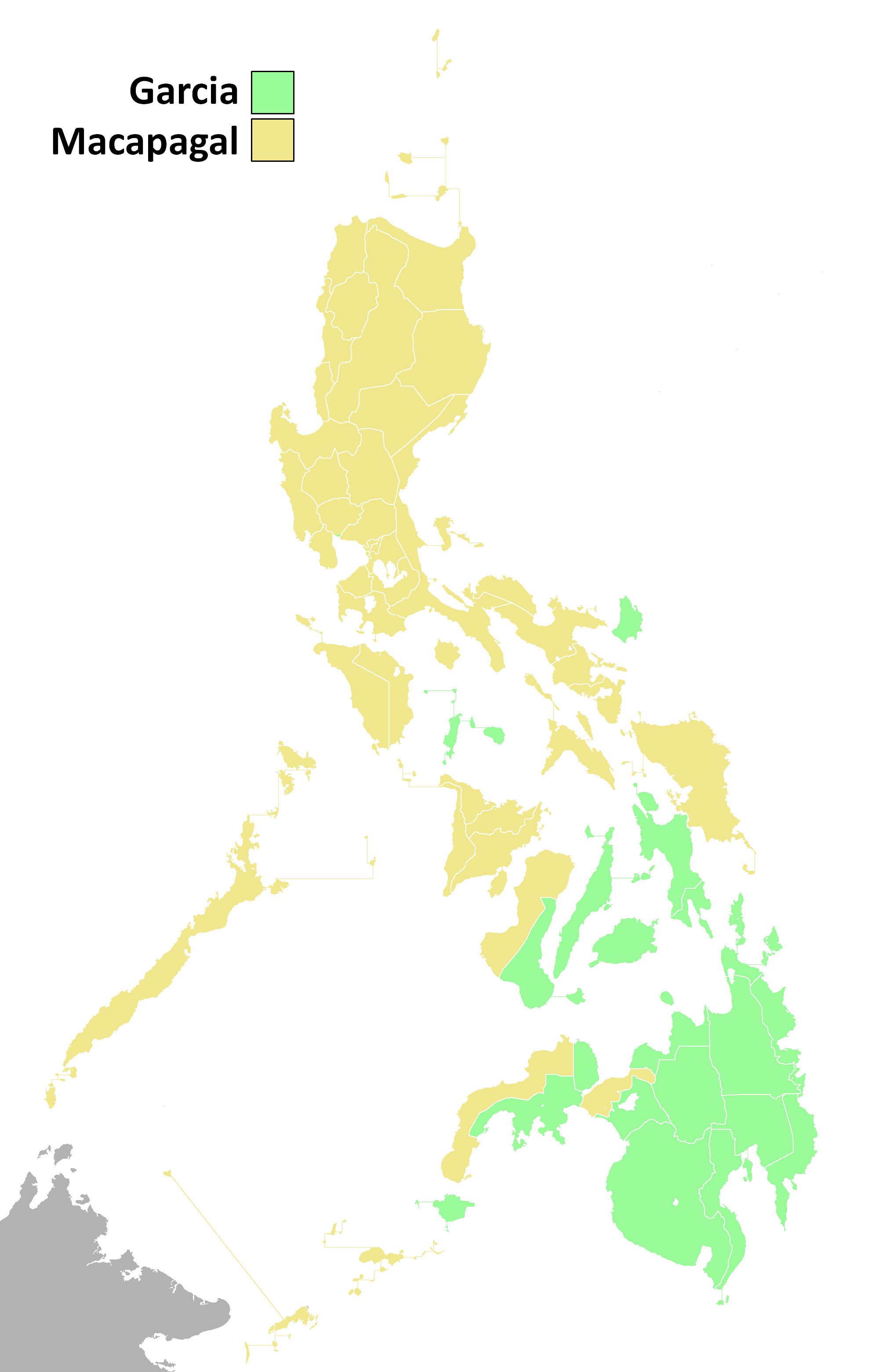
- Election results per province/city.
President before election
Carlos P. Garcia
Nacionalista
Elected President
Diosdado Macapagal
Liberal
- Vice presidential election
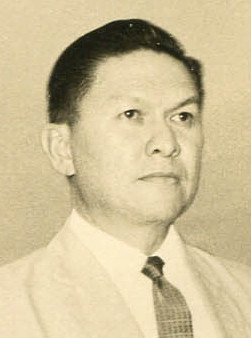

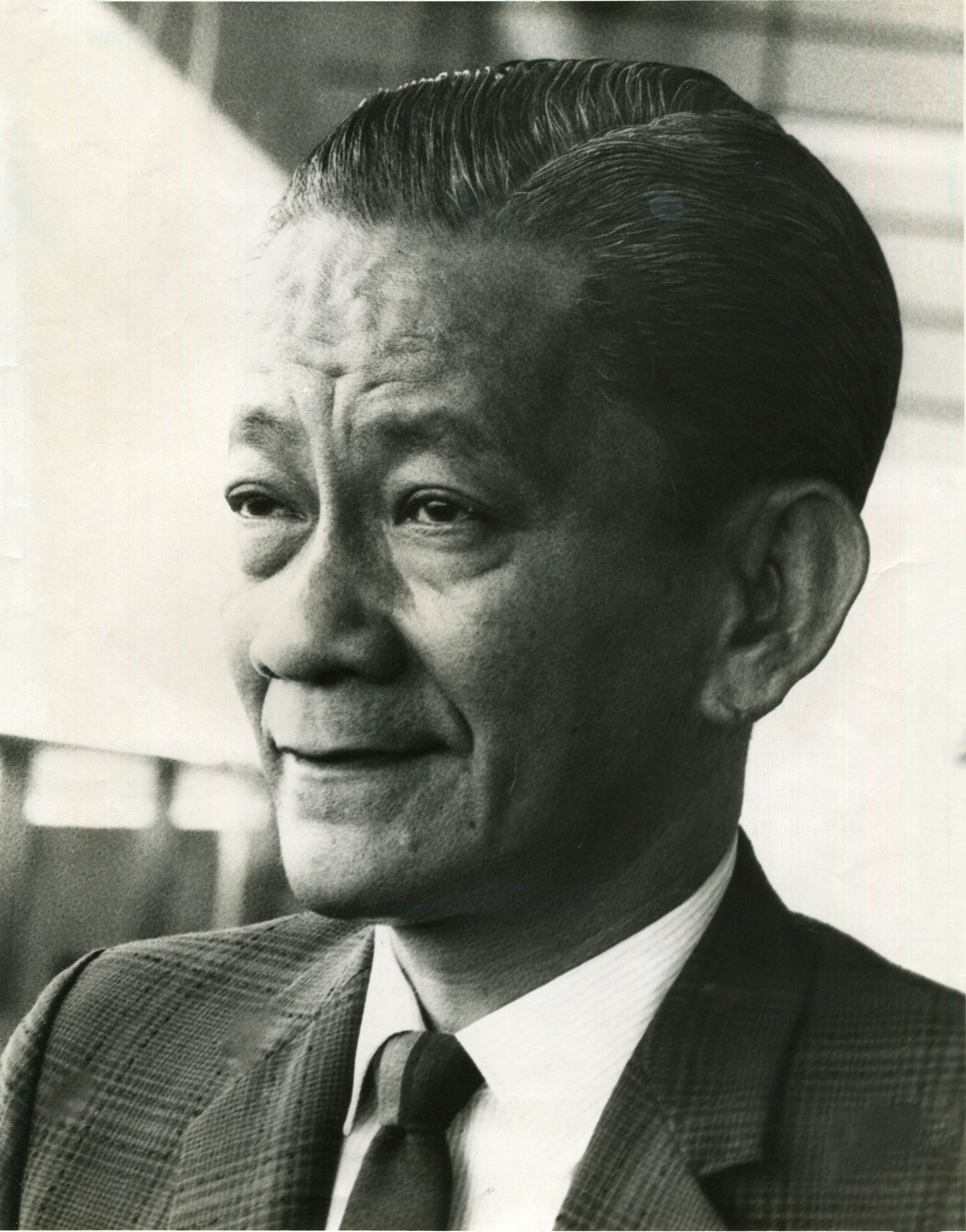

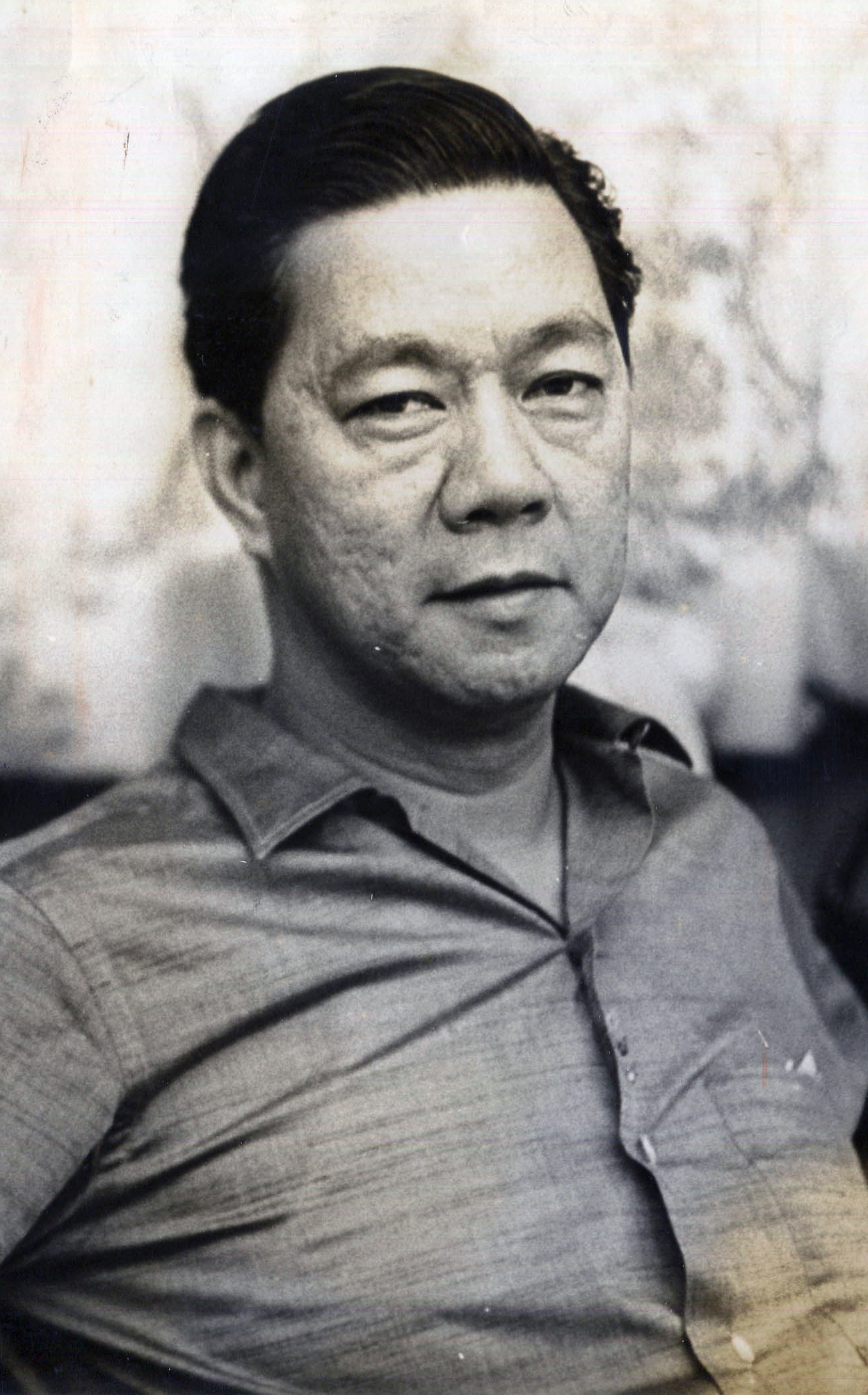
Candidate	Emmanuel Pelaez	Sergio Osmeña Jr.	Gil Puyat
Party	Liberal	Independent	Nacionalista
Popular vote	2,394,400	2,190,424	1,787,987
Percentage	37.57%	34.37%	28.06%
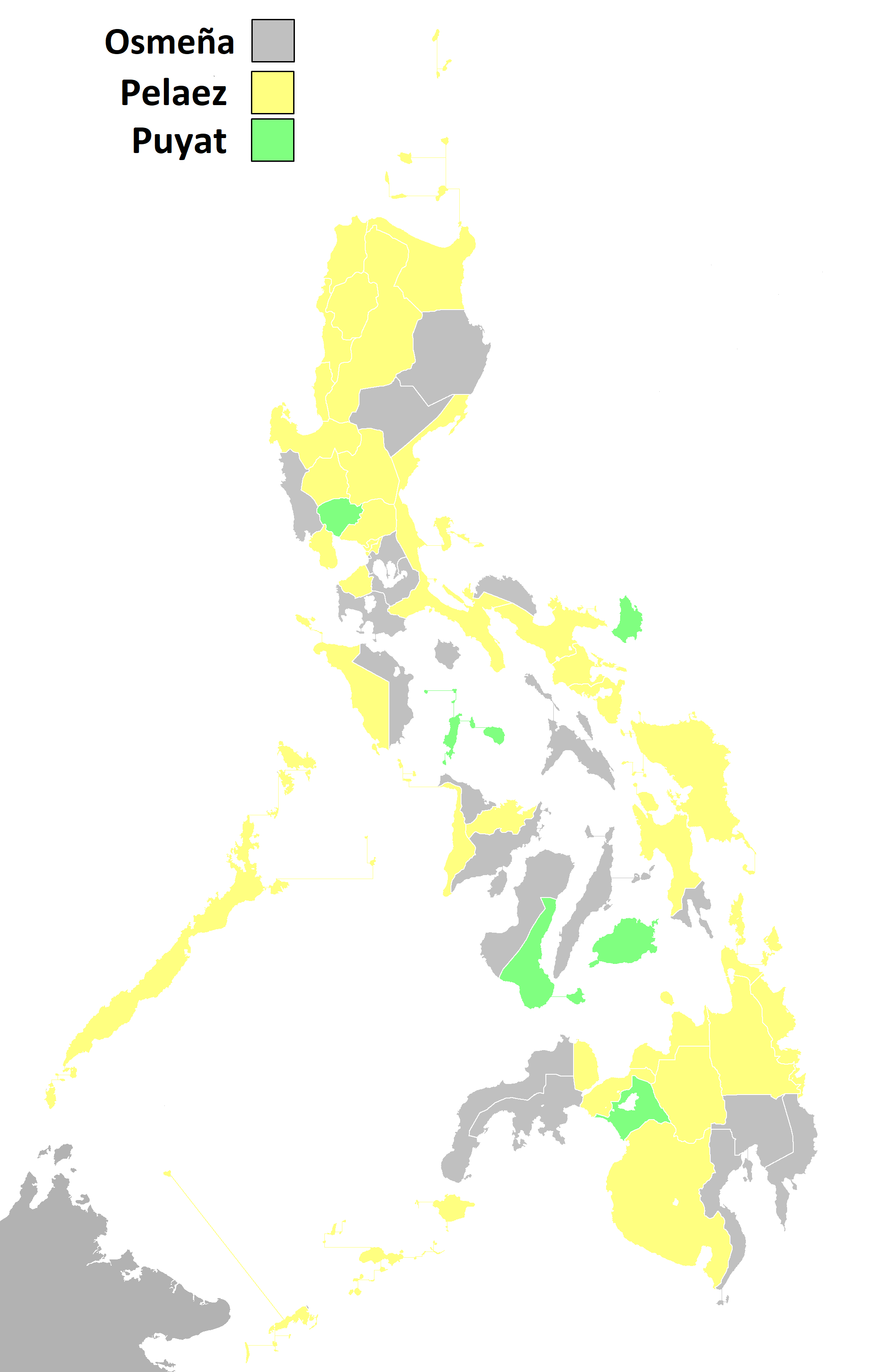
- Election results per province/city.
Vice President before election
Diosdado Macapagal
Liberal
Elected Vice President
Emmanuel Pelaez
Liberal
- Senate election

8 of the 24 seats in the Philippine Senate 13 needs for a majority
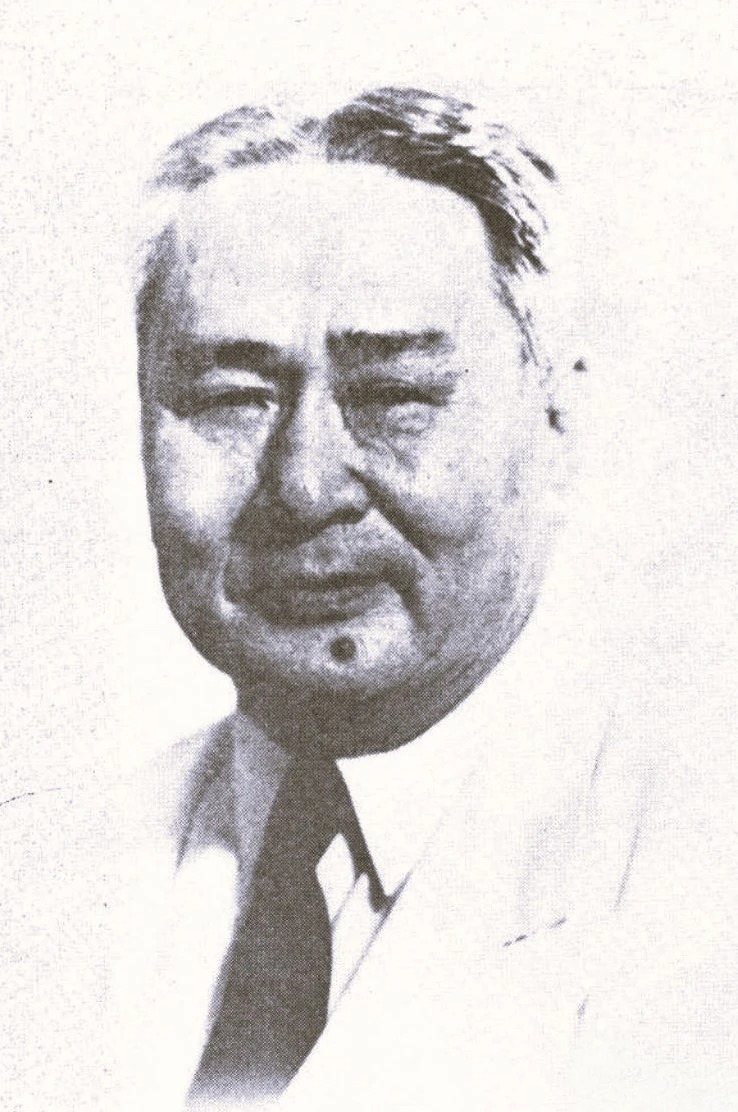

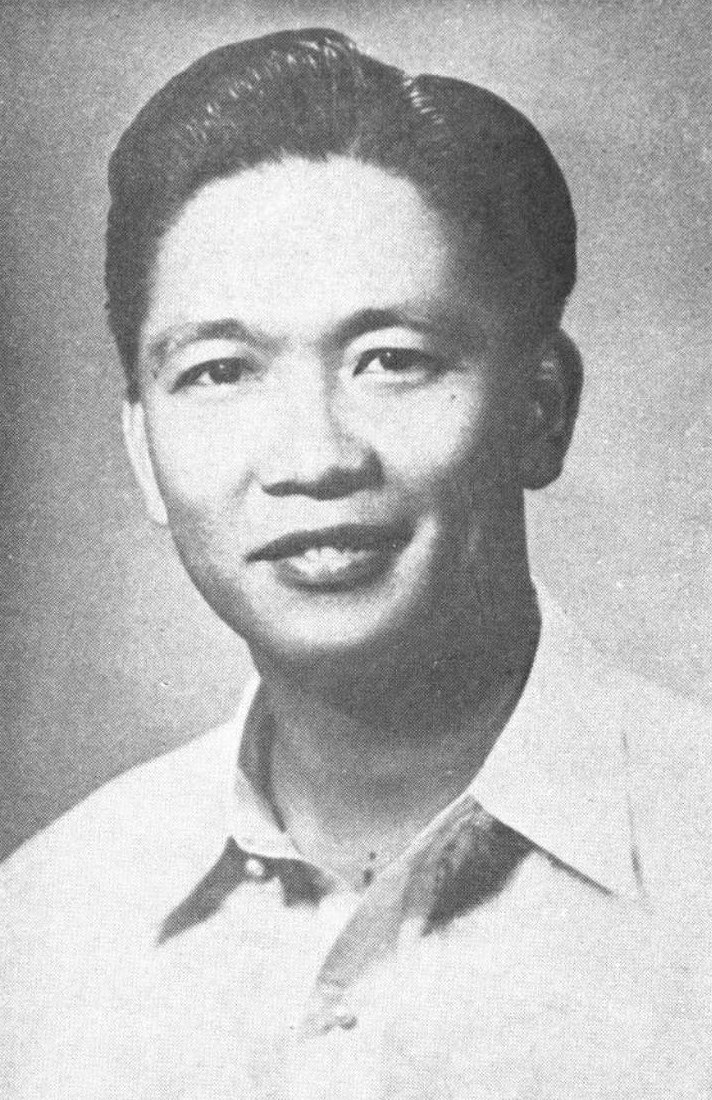

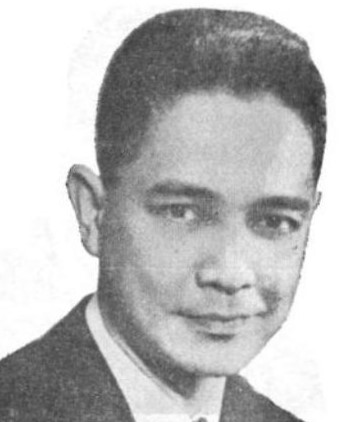
	First party	Second party	Third party
Leader	Eulogio Rodriguez	Ferdinand Marcos	Raul Manglapus
Party	Nacionalista	Liberal	Progressive
Seats before	17 (6 up)	5 (1 up)	0
Seats won	2	4	2
Seats after	13	8	2
Seat change	▼4	▲3	▲2
Popular vote	17,834,477	14,988,931	6,577,698
Percentage	45.07	37.88	16.62
Swing	▲0.03	▲9.58	▼3.99
Senate President before election
Eulogio Rodriguez
Nacionalista
Elected Senate President
Eulogio Rodriguez
Nacionalista
- House elections

All 104 seats in the House of Representatives of the Philippines 53 seats needed for a majority
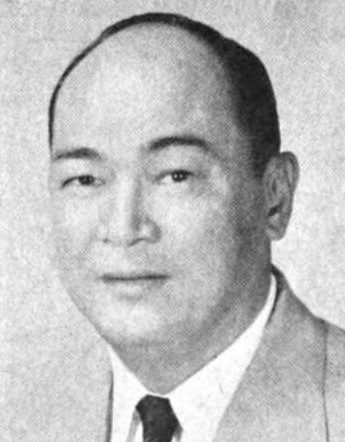

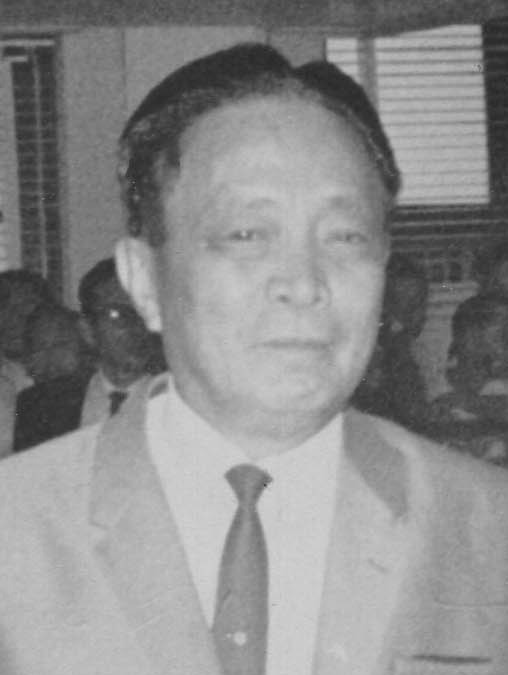
	Majority party	Minority party
Leader	Daniel Romualdez	Cornelio Villareal
Party	Nacionalista	Liberal
Leader's seat	Leyte–1st	Capiz–2nd
Last election	82 seats, 61.19%	19 seats, 30.17%
Seats won	74	29
Seat change	▼8	▲10
Popular vote	3,923,390	2,167,641
Percentage	61.02	33.71
Swing	▼0.17	▲3.54
Speaker before election
Daniel Romualdez
Nacionalista
Elected Speaker
Cornelio Villareal
Liberal

Presidential, legislative and local elections were held in the Philippines on November 14, 1961. Incumbent President Carlos P. Garcia lost his opportunity for a second full term as President of the Philippines to Vice President President Diosdado Macapagal. His running mate, Senator Gil J. Puyat lost to Senator Emmanuel Pelaez. Independent Candidate Cebu City Mayor Sergio Osmeña, Jr. ran for vice president also lost by a narrow margin. Six candidates ran for president, four of whom were "nuisance" candidates. This was the only election in Philippine electoral history in which a vice-president defeated the incumbent president.

== Results ==
=== President ===
Candidate	Party	Votes	%
Diosdado Macapagal	Liberal Party	3,554,840	55.05
Carlos P. Garcia (incumbent)	Nacionalista Party	2,902,996	44.95
Alfredo Abcede	Federal Party	7	0.00
German F. Villanueva	Independent	2	0.00
Gregorio L. Llanza	Independent	2	0.00
Praxedes Floro	Independent	0	0.00
Total		6,457,847	100.00
Valid votes		6,457,847	95.83
Invalid/blank votes		280,988	4.17
Total votes		6,738,835	100.00
Registered voters/turnout		8,483,568	79.43
Source: Nohlen, Grotz, Hartmann, Hasall and Santos

=== Vice-President ===
Candidate	Party	Votes	%
Emmanuel Pelaez	Liberal Party	2,394,400	37.57
Sergio Osmeña Jr.	Independent	2,190,424	34.37
Gil Puyat	Nacionalista Party	1,787,987	28.06
Chencay Reyes Juta	Dominion Status Party	2	0.00
Total		6,372,813	100.00
Valid votes		6,372,813	94.57
Invalid/blank votes		365,992	5.43
Total votes		6,738,805	100.00
Registered voters/turnout		8,483,568	79.43
Source: Nohlen, Grotz, Hartmann, Hasall and Santos

=== Senate ===
Representation of results; seats contested are inside the box. Nacionalista Party Liberal Party Progressive Party Nationalist Citizens' Party

Candidate	Party	Votes	%
Raul Manglapus	Party for Philippine Progress (Note: Guest candidate of the Liberal Party)	3,489,658	51.78
Manuel Manahan	Party for Philippine Progress	3,088,040	45.82
Lorenzo Sumulong	Nacionalista Party	2,817,228	41.81
Soc Rodrigo	Liberal Party	2,710,322	40.22
Gaudencio Antonino	Liberal Party	2,636,420	39.12
Camilo Osías	Liberal Party	2,634,783	39.10
Maria Kalaw Katigbak	Liberal Party	2,546,147	37.78
Jose Roy	Nacionalista Party	2,443,110	36.25
Tecla San Andres Ziga	Liberal Party	2,318,518	34.41
Quintin Paredes	Nacionalista Party	2,206,064	32.74
Pacita Madrigal-Gonzales	Nacionalista Party	2,172,260	32.24
Cesar Climaco	Liberal Party	2,142,741	31.80
Domocao Alonto	Nacionalista Party	1,877,698	27.86
Decoroso Rosales	Nacionalista Party	1,863,560	27.65
Pedro Sabido	Nacionalista Party	1,746,698	25.92
Angel Castaño	Nacionalista Party	1,734,247	25.74
Jose E. Romero	Nacionalista Party	973,612	14.45
Agustin Marking	Independent	127,820	1.90
Francisco Ofemaria	Independent	41,084	0.61
Ernesto Hidalgo	Independent	1,878	0.03
Leon Javinez Sr.	Independent	339	0.01
Jose Briones	Independent	141	0.00
Total		39,572,368	100.00
Total votes		6,738,805	–
Registered voters/turnout		8,483,568	79.43

=== House of Representatives ===
Party	Votes	%	+/–	Seats	+/–
Nacionalista Party	3,923,390	61.02	−0.17	74	−8
Liberal Party	2,167,641	33.71	+3.54	29	+10
Nacionalista Party (independent)	47,614	0.74	+0.68	0	0
Liberal Party (independent)	40,220	0.63	−0.44	0	0
Nationalist Citizens' Party	7,837	0.12	−2.73	0	0
Independent	243,110	3.78	+1.44	1	New
Total	6,429,812	100.00	–	104	+2
Valid votes	6,429,812	95.41	+1.08		
Invalid/blank votes	308,993	4.59	−1.08		
Total votes	6,738,805	100.00	–		
Registered voters/turnout	8,483,568	79.43	+3.91		
Source: Nohlen, Grotz and Hartmann and Teehankee

== See also ==
- Commission on Elections
- Politics of the Philippines
- Philippine elections
- President of the Philippines
- 5th Congress of the Philippines
