= Manuel Manahan =

Filipino politician (1916–1994)

The Honorable Manuel P. Manahan
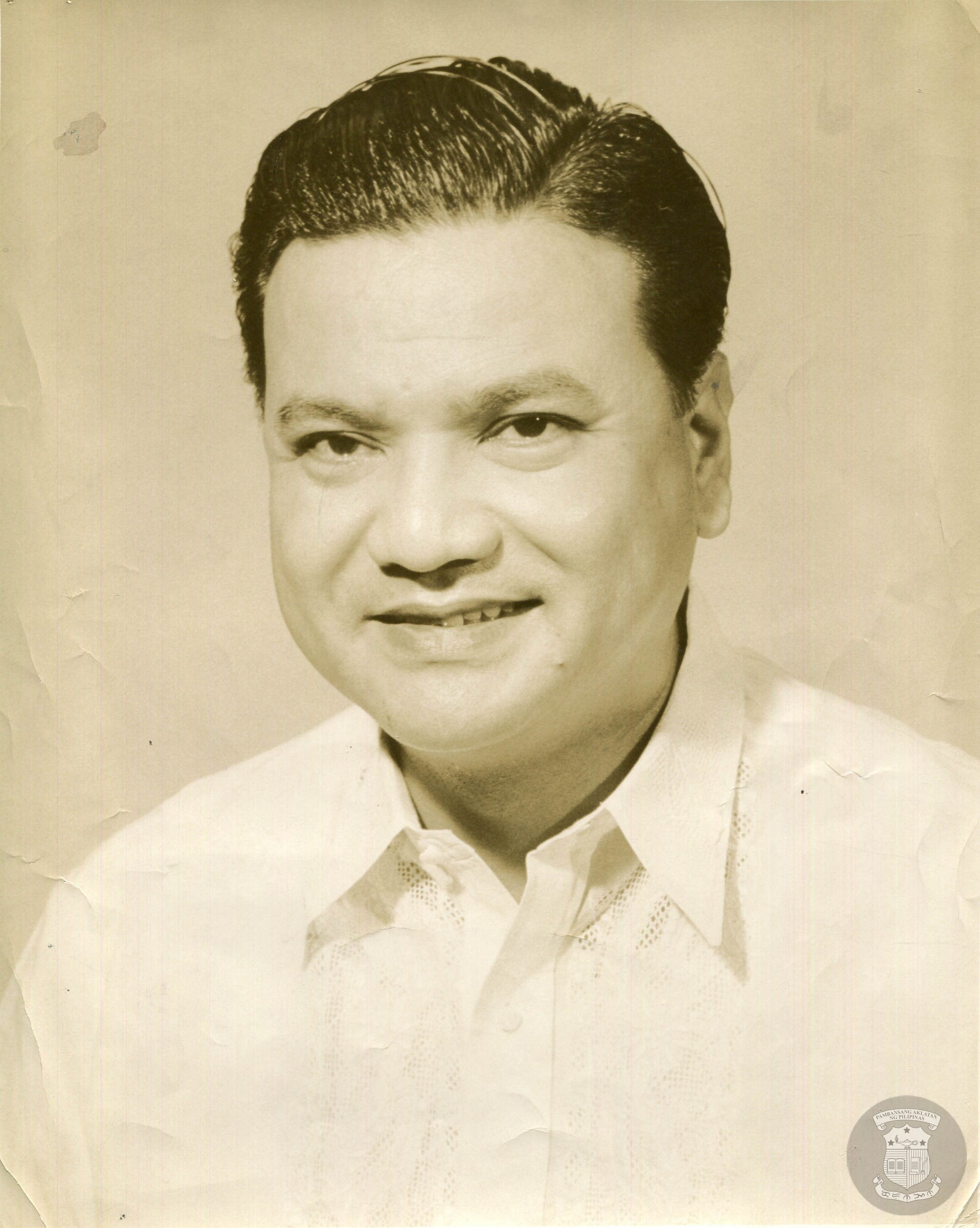

Senator of the Philippines
- In office December 30, 1961 – December 30, 1967

Commissioner of the Bureau of Customs
- In office 1955–1957
- President: Ramon Magsaysay; Carlos P. Garcia
- Preceded by: Jaime Velasquez
- Succeeded by: Eleuterio Capaspas

Personal details
- Born: Manuel Perez Manahan; January 1, 1916 Manila, Philippine Islands
- Died: May 18, 1994 (aged 78) Caba, La Union, Philippines
- Party: Independent (1969–1994)
- Other political affiliations: Progressive (1957–1969); Nacionalista (until 1957)
- Education: Ateneo de Manila (BA)
- Profession: Journalist, businessman

Manuel Perez Manahan (January 1, 1916 – May 18, 1994) was a Filipino politician, journalist, businessman, and rural development advocate. He was a key government official during the administration of president Ramon Magsaysay, best known for his stint as the head of the Presidential Complaints and Action Commission. Together with Raul Manglapus, he co-founded the Progressive Party and served as its presidential candidate in 1957. He also served as Senator of the Philippines from 1961 until 1967.

== Early life and career ==
Manahan was the third of six children of Juan Manahan and Cleotilde Perez. He finished high school in 1933 at the Ateneo de Manila, and acquired his bachelor of arts degree in 1937 at the same institution.

After finishing his studies, Manahan began a business career, most notably in soft drinks manufacturing. In 1933, he established the Philippine Standard Products Company. In 1937, he became a business apprentice at H.E. Heacock and Company, a major department store on Escolta Street in Manila.

During World War II, he was imprisoned in Fort Santiago by Japanese forces after he was suspected of being in contact with the Philippine Army. He shared a crowded cell along with other prominent Filipinos such as Eulogio Rodriguez, Colonel Jose Olivares, and Bienvenido de la Paz. He was eventually released four months later.

After his release, he went on to work for the Liberator, an underground newspaper. For this he was awarded the honor of Officer of the Philippine Legion of Honor in 1950.

== Journalistic career ==
After World War II, Manahan assisted in the editing and publication of the Free Philippines, a political paper. Later, he published three Manila newspapers, namely: the Liberty News (English daily), Bagong Buhay (Tagalog daily), and La Voz de Manila (Spanish publication). In 1945, he also served as the representative of the Philippine press at the United Nations Conference on International Organization in San Francisco.

In 1953, he was elected as the president of the Philippine News Service.

== Early government service ==
In 1954, he was appointed by President Ramon Magsaysay as the head of the Presidential Complaints and Action Commission (PCAC), a newly formed commission responsible for receiving complaints against government officials and employees, among other problems. He also headed an anonymous organization responsible for screening prospective appointees of the Magsaysay administration for their moral fitness.

Due to his success in managing the PCAC, he was later appointed as commissioner of customs. In his new position, he successfully implemented significant reforms in the graft-prone agency. For this, the Philippine Free Press dubbed as the "Man of the Year" in 1955.

He also played a key role in four months of negotiations and the surrender of Luis Taruc, the leader of the communist group Hukbalahap, on 17 May 1954. The negotiations with Taruc highlighted social inequity among rural farmworkers that led to promises to address some of these issues. Shortly thereafter, Manahan became actively involved in the development of the Philippine Rural Reconstruction Movement (PRRM) that was then establishing an agricultural training center and demonstration farm in San Leonardo, Nueva Ecija.

== 1957 presidential campaign ==
When Magsaysay died due to a plane crash in 1957, Vice President Carlos P. Garcia soon assumed office as President. With the presidential election scheduled to be held in the same year, Magsaysay's death also triggered a chaotic political situation in the country, most notably with the ruling Nacionalista Party.

Manahan, among other Nacionalistas closely associated with Magsaysay, were disappointed by the "cold treatment" given to them by allies of President Garcia and decided to leave the party. Soon, Manahan co-founded the Progressive Party of the Philippines together with Raul Manglapus. The new party aimed to be an alternative to the Nacionalista Party and the Liberal Party. Manahan served as its candidate for the presidential election, with Vicente Araneta as his running mate.

Despite having less money compared to the candidates of the two major parties, he was able to rally significant support among the masses with his popular appeal and his resemblance, both physically and ideologically, to the late President Magsaysay.

On September 7, 1957, Manahan survived an assassination attempt while campaigning in Opon, Cebu. Andronico Baguio, the would-be assassin, attempted to kill Manahan with a 7-inch knife. However, he was quickly apprehended by Manahan's bodyguards. Manahan eventually asked the police to release Baguio as soon as they confiscated his knife.

Manahan lost to Garcia in the presidential election, managing to rank in 3rd place with 20.90 percent of the vote. Araneta, his running mate, lost to Diosdado Macapagal of the Liberal Party.

== Senatorial career ==
In the 1959 general election, the Progressive Party collaborated with defectors from the Nacionalista and Liberal parties to form the Grand Alliance. Manahan became one of the candidates of the Alliance for the senatorial election. However, Manahan was not able to win a seat in the Senate.

In the 1961 general election, the Grand Alliance joined forces with the Liberal Party to oppose President Garcia's bid for reelection and endorse Vice-President Macapagal's presidential candidacy. Under the coalition, Manahan made a second attempt for a seat in the Senate and succeeded.

As senator, he headed the Senate Committee on Banks, Corporations and Franchises, as well as the Senate committees for scientific management, national defense and security, cultural minorities, and provincial and municipal governments and cities. He also served as a member of the Commission on Appointments. Manahan also worked on the decentralization bill together with longtime ally Manglapus, who was also elected as Senator in the same year.

== 1965 vice-presidential campaign ==
After President Diosdado Macapagal failed to meet the expectations of the Grand Alliance, several members, including Manahan, separated from the Liberal Party. In the 1965 general election, the Party for Philippine Progress was formed, with Manahan serving as the running mate for the party's presidential candidate Manglapus. However, both were not successful in the election, with Manahan managing to acquire only 3 percent of the vote.

== Post-political career and death ==
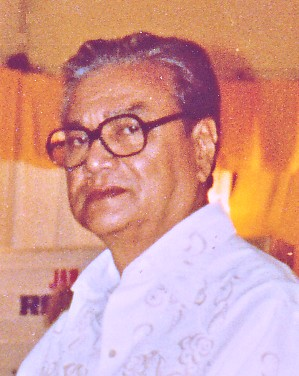
Manahan in his later years

After leaving the Senate in 1967, Manahan served as chairman of the Cooperative Foundation of the Philippines and of the Philippine Rural Reconstruction Movement. He also served briefly as president of Tabacalera. Prior to the declaration of martial law in 1972, Manahan served as the executive vice-president of the Manila Times Publishing Corporation. Prior to his death, he served as chairman of the board of the College Assurance Plan and the CAP Pension Corporation.

He Tried Returning To The Senate In The 1987 Philippine Senate election But Lost With 570,979 Votes as An Independent Candidate. Manahan was awarded with the Dona Aurora – Aragon Award for Peace and the "Lux in Domini" award of the Ateneo de Manila. He was also named "Ama ng Kooperatiba" (Father of the Cooperatives) by President Corazon Aquino.

Manahan died due to heart failure on May 18, 1994, in Caba, La Union. He was survived by his wife Constancia la Guardia, with whom he has ten children.

== Family and legacy ==
After Manahan's death, a group of family members and friends established the Manuel P. Manahan Foundation in his honor in 2002. The foundation aims to provide integrated programs to enhance the living conditions of members of the marginalized society. His daughter in law, Maria Socorro "Muffet" Manahan, the Executive Director of the Manuel P. Manahan Foundation, was a candidate for the Philippine Senate representing the Partido Federal ng Pilipinas in the 2019 elections.

His brother, Constantino P. Manahan, was a medical doctor specializing in obstetrics and was a founder of the Makati Medical Center, and his sister-in-law Elvira Ledesma Manahan (Constantino's wife) was an actress and television talk show host. His nephews, Johnny Manahan is a television personality, Joey Manahan, is a politician in Hawaii and Philip Manahan, is a public servant in the Department of the Interior and Local Government. Benjamin Manahan Jr., is the Regional Director for the Department of Tourism.

== Electoral history ==
Electoral history of Manuel Manahan
Year	Office	Party	Votes received				Result
Year	Office	Party	Total	%	P.	Swing	Result
1957	President of the Philippines	Progressive	1,049,420	20.90%	3rd	—N/a	Lost
1959	Senator of the Philippines	Progressive	1,512,512	23.66%	13th	—N/a	Lost
1961	Senator of the Philippines	Progressive	3,088,040	45.82%	2nd	—N/a	Won
1987	Senator of the Philippines	Independent	570,979	2.51%	69th	—N/a	Lost
1965	Vice President of the Philippines	Progressive	247,426	3.40%	3rd	—N/a	Lost
