= Mambo Magsaysay =

Song
- Language: English and Tagalog
- Released: 1953
- Composer(s): Raul Manglapus

"Mambo Magsaysay", also known as the "Magsaysay Mambo", is a song which was used as a jingle for the presidential campaign of then-candidate Ramon Magsaysay for the 1953 Philippine election. Composed by Raul Manglapus, it pioneered the use of campaign jingles in presidential elections in the Philippines.

== Song ==
"Mambo Magsaysay" was composed by Raul Manglapus with its lyrics originally written in a mix of Tagalog and English languages.

The jingle portrayed the Philippines as disorderly prior to Magsaysay's tenure as defense secretary (1950–1953). The song highlighted the alleged "corruption" in the 1949 elections which was won by Elpidio Quirino, the incumbent president at the time of the jingle's first use. Quirino was accused of holding a "dirty election" by Carlos Romulo and Marvin Gray.

== Use ==
"Mambo Magsaysay" is believed to be the first jingle to be used in the Philippine presidential elections and was used for the campaign of then-candidate Ramon Magsaysay in the 1953 Philippine election. This came after Manila mayor candidate Arsenio Lacson's use of his own jingle in 1951. Manglapus, the song's composer served as leader of the "Magsaysay for President Movement".

It was later used by June Keithley, the sole announcer of Radyo Bandido as a morale booster for protesters of the People Power Revolution in February 1986.

== Derivatives ==
=== Ilocano version ===
An Ilocano language version of the song exist and was used for Magsaysay's campaign in the Ilocos region. This iteration of the song was performed by Lucas Paredes.

=== People Power Revolution ===
The song "Mambo, Mambo", which makes use of the tune of the Magsaysay song, is part of the Handog ng Pilipino sa Mundo album which was released in within the same year and was dedicated to the revolution.
