= Progressive Party (Philippines) =

Defunct political party in the Philippines (1957–1969)

Progressive Party of the Philippines
- Founder: Manuel Manahan; Raul Manglapus
- Founded: 1957
- Dissolved: 1969
- Split from: Nacionalista
- Ideology: Progressivism; Reformism
- Political position: Centre-left

The Progressive Party of the Philippines (PPP), also known as the Party for Philippine Progress, was a reformist political party that existed in the late 1950s and the 1960s. It is considered to be the earliest Filipino form of a genuine alternative party to the then-dominant political pair of the Nacionalista Party and the Liberal Party. The party ceased to exist by 1969.

== History ==
=== Formation and Garcia's administration: 1957–1961 ===
The party was founded in 1957 by Manuel Manahan and Raul Manglapus, both of whom had served as key members of the administration of President Ramon Magsaysay before his untimely death earlier that year. The formation came as a result of the dissatisfaction of members of the Nacionalista Party over the "cold treatment" given to them by allies of newly installed President Carlos P. Garcia.

In the 1957 general election held later that year, Manahan ran as the standard-bearer of the new party while Vicente Araneta served as his running mate. The party also fielded a complete slate of eight senatorial candidates, among them being Manglapus.

Manahan launched a campaign similar to that of the deceased but still popular Magsaysay, thus allowing him to become popular with the masses and pose a credible threat to President Garcia and Jose Yulo, the Liberal candidate. In the end, Manahan only ranked third behind President Garcia, managing to acquire 20.90 percent of the vote. Araneta, on the other hand, lost to Liberal Congressman Diosdado Macapagal, garnering 7.97 percent of the vote. None of the senatorial candidates in the party won seats in the Senate.

In the 1959 midterm election, the party allied itself with Liberal and Nacionalista defectors to form the Grand Alliance. During the campaign, the Grand Alliance highlighted the graft and corruption taking place under the Garcia administration. Eventually, the Alliance was successful in diminishing the Senate Nacionalista majority.

=== Macapagal and Marcos' presidencies : 1961–1969 ===
In 1961, the Progressives, under the Grand Alliance, joined forces with Liberals in order to prevent the re-election of President Garcia. Together, the united parties supported Liberal Vice-President Macapagal as its candidate for the 1961 presidential election and Progressive Emmanuel Pelaez, (who later joined Liberal) as his running mate. Progressives Manglapus and Manahan also ran as guest senatorial candidates of Liberal, with both of them managing to win seats in the Senate.

By 1965, members of the Grand Alliance separated themselves from Liberals due to their dissatisfaction with the Macapagal administration for not fulfilling their expectations. Soon, the Progressive Party was renamed as the Party for Philippine Progress. It fielded Manglapus as its presidential candidate for the general election held later that year, and Manahan ran as its vice-presidential candidate. The rejuvenated party also fielded its own senatorial slate, though it was incomplete.

Widely known as the Third Force, the Party for Philippine Progress was seen as a genuine alternative to President Macapagal and former Liberal Senator Ferdinand Marcos, now a Nacionalista. Manglapus, in particular, showed surprising strength in the larger cities and the young voters. But unlike the 1957 election in which Manahan was seen as a viable contender, Manglapus was not seen as having a good chance of winning the election. In the end, Manglapus lost to Marcos with 5.17 percent of the vote, while Manahan lost to former Vice President Fernando Lopez, the running mate of Marcos, with 3.40 percent of the vote.

The party continued to exist until it quietly disbanded in 1969.

== Members ==
=== Candidates ===
The following were members of the Progressive Party who ran as candidates in the national elections. Those highlighted in bold signify those who were able to win the position they were running for.

Year	President	Vice President	Senators
1957	Manuel Manahan	Vicente Araneta	Eleuterio Adevoso; Jaime Ferrer; Josefa Gonzales-Estrada; Jose M. Hernandez; Raul Manglapus; Fulvio Pelaez; Rodrigo Perez Jr. Norberto Romualdez Jr.
1959 (Note: As the Grand Alliance)	None (Note: No presidential election was held this year.)	None (Note: No vice-presidential election was held this year.)	Manuel Manahan; Raul Manglapus; Osmundo Mondoñedo; Emmanuel Pelaez; Narciso Pimentel Jr. Jesus Vargas
1961 (Note: As the Grand Alliance and as guest members of the Liberal Party)	None (Note: The Progressives endorsed Diosdado Macapagal (Liberal).)	**Emmanuel Pelaez**	**Manuel Manahan**; **Raul Manglapus**
1965 (Note: As the Party for Philippine Progress)	Raul Manglapus	Manuel Manahan	Vicente Araneta; Jose Feria; Benjamin Gaston; Dionisio Ojeda

=== Others ===
- Richard Gordon
- Blas Ople

== Electoral performance ==
=== President and Vice President ===
Year	Presidential election				Vice presidential election			
Year	Candidate	Votes	Vote share	Result	Candidate	Votes	Vote share	Result
1957	Manuel Manahan	1,049,420	20.9%	Carlos P. Garcia (Nacionalista)	Vicente Araneta	1,375,090	8%	Diosdado Macapagal (Liberal)
1961	None (Note: Endorsed the candidacy of Diosdado Macapagal of Liberal Party.)			Diosdado Macapagal (Liberal)	None (Note: Endorsed the candidacy of Emmanuel Pelaez of Liberal Party.)			Emmanuel Pelaez (Liberal)
1965	Raul Manglapus	384,564	5.2%	Ferdinand E. Marcos (Nacionalista)	Manuel Manahan	247,426	3.4%	Fernando Lopez (Nacionalista)

=== Congress ===
Senate election	Votes	%	Senate seats	+/–	Senate Result	House election	Votes	%	House Seats	+/–	House Result
1957	3,393,935	12.1%	0 / 24	Steady	Lost	1957	62,968	1.3	0 / 102	Steady	Lost
1959	3,163,609	9.5%	0 / 24	Steady	Lost	1957	62,968	1.3	0 / 102	Steady	Lost
1961	6,577,698	16.6%	2 / 24	▲2	Won	1961	Did not participate				
1963			2 / 24	2	Seats only retained	1961	Did not participate				
1965	1,128,675	2.3%	2 / 24	2	Seats only retained	1965	41,983	0.6	0 / 104	Steady	Lost
1967	Did not participate					1965	41,983	0.6	0 / 104	Steady	Lost
1969	Did not participate					1969	5,031	0.0	0 / 110	Steady	Lost

== Legacy ==
Despite the decline of the party, it had considerable influence in current Philippine politics. For instance, the Lakas, an active center-right political party in the country, considers the Progressive Party as its predecessor, largely because Manglapus was one of the earliest members of Lakas in the 1990s.

Elements of progressive political philosophy are also believed to have been passed on to later politicians no matter what part of the political spectrum they may belong to, such as former senator Raul Roco, and the philosophy was one of the main ideology of Roco's founded party Aksyon.
