= Emmanuel Pelaez =

Vice President of the Philippines from 1961 to 1965

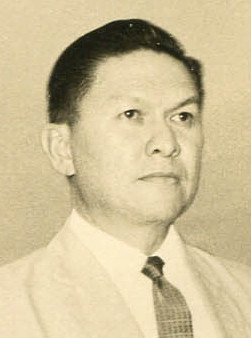

6th Vice President of the Philippines
- In office December 30, 1961 – December 30, 1965
- President: Diosdado Macapagal
- Preceded by: Diosdado Macapagal
- Succeeded by: Fernando Lopez

9th Secretary of Foreign Affairs
- In office December 30, 1961 – July 1963
- President: Diosdado Macapagal
- Preceded by: Felixberto Serrano
- Succeeded by: Salvador P. Lopez

Ambassador of the Philippines to the United States
- In office 1986–1992
- President: Corazon Aquino; Fidel V. Ramos
- Preceded by: Benjamin Romualdez
- Succeeded by: Pablo Suarez

Senator of the Philippines
- In office December 30, 1967 – September 23, 1972
- In office December 30, 1953 – December 30, 1959

Member of the House of Representatives from Misamis Oriental's at-large district
- In office December 30, 1965 – December 30, 1967
- Preceded by: Vicente de Lara
- Succeeded by: Pedro Roa
- In office December 30, 1949 – December 30, 1953
- Preceded by: Pedro Baculio
- Succeeded by: Ignacio Cruz

Member of the Interim Batasang Pambansa
- In office June 12, 1978 – June 5, 1984
- Constituency: Region X

Personal details
- Born: Emmanuel Neri Pelaez; November 30, 1915 Medina, Misamis, Philippine Islands
- Died: July 27, 2003 (aged 87) Muntinlupa, Philippines
- Party: Independent (1972–1978; 1984–2004)
- Other political affiliations: KBL (1978–1984); Progressive (1959–1961); Nacionalista (1953–1959; 1964–1972); Liberal (1949–1953; 1961–1964)
- Spouse: Edith Fabella
- Children: 9
- Education: Cebu Junior College, UP (AA); University of Manila (LL.B)

Emmanuel Neri Pelaez (November 30, 1915 – July 27, 2003) was a Filipino public servant and politician who served as the 6th Vice President of the Philippines from 1961 to 1965.

== Early life and career ==
Pelaez was born in Medina, Misamis (now part of Misamis Oriental) to Gregorio Aguilar Pelaez, Sr. and Felipa Vicente Neri (second wife). He was fourth among eight children between Gregorio and Felipa: Rosario, Concepción, Gregorio Jr., Emmanuel, Jose Ma., Lourdes, Antonio, and Carmen. He studied in Cagayan de Misamis (former name of Cagayan de Oro) Elementary School where he got the highest honors. He then went to the Ateneo de Manila High School and got his Associate in Arts at the Cebu UP Junior College.

He received his law degree from the University of Manila in 1938, and in the same year topped the Bar examinations. He worked as a Senate Clerk at the Journal Division from 1934 to 1935, Debate Reporter from 1935 to 1937, and court translator from 1937 to 1938. He was employed as assistant court reporter at the Court of Appeals from 1939 to 1940, then later Special Prosecutor of the People's Court from 1945 up to 1946. Pelaez practiced law and at the same time professor of law at the University of Manila from 1946 up to 1963.

== First stint in Congress ==
In 1949, he was elected Congressman, representing his home province. During his term as representative, He was adjudged one of the Ten Outstanding Congressmen by the Congressional Press Club, one of the Ten Most Useful Congressmen by the Philippines Free Press, and one of the two Most Outstanding Congressmen by the League of Women Voters of the Philippines.

Such achievements in the Lower House of Congress brought him to the Senate floor in 1953. He was unanimously chosen Most Outstanding Senator by the League of Women Voters of the Philippines and the Senate Press Club. In 1959, he was unsuccessful in his Senate re-election bid, placing 10th out of the 8 seats up for election.

== Vice presidency (1961–1965) ==
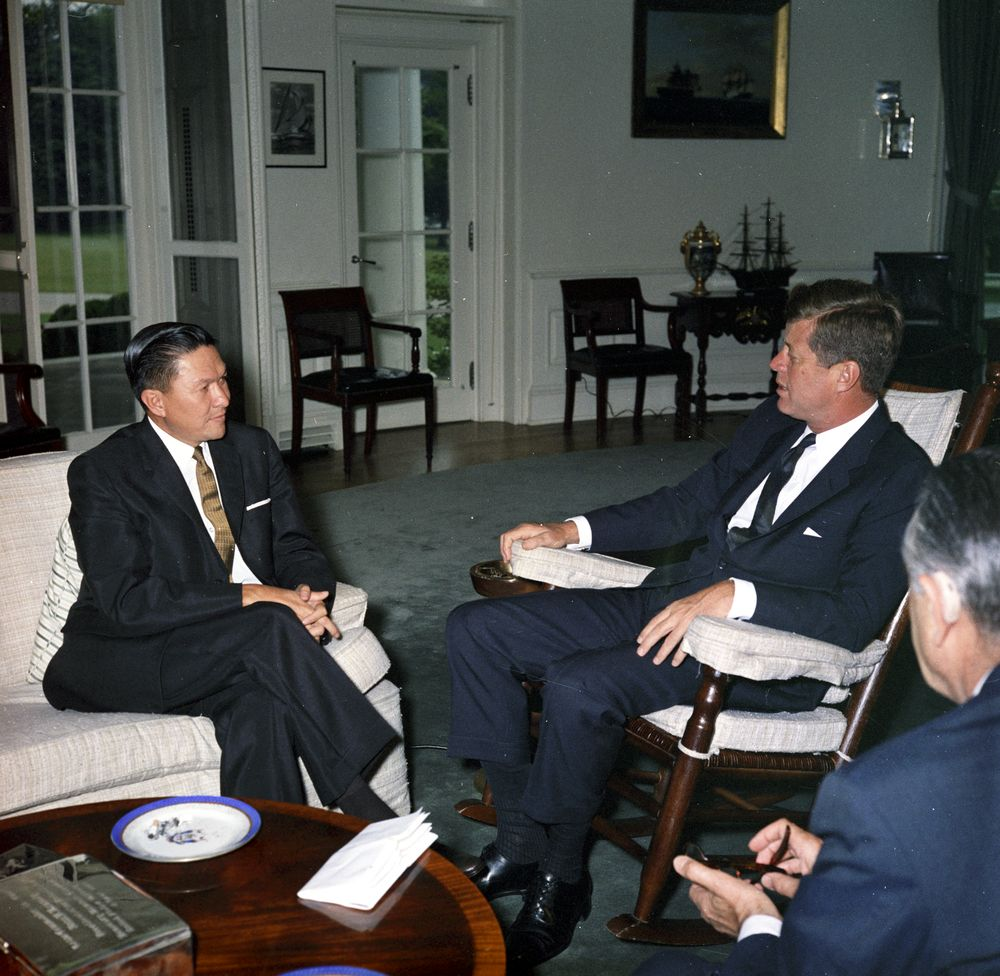
U.S. President John F. Kennedy receives Vice President Emmanuel Pelaez on June 26, 1962

Pelaez was elected vice president in 1961, simultaneously performing the functions of Foreign Affairs Secretary. He resigned in 1963 as Secretary, after a dispute with the Macapagal administration. In the same year, he was chosen Man of the Year by the Examiner and the following year was adjudged the Most Outstanding Alumnus during the Golden Jubilee Celebration of the University of Manila.

In May 1962, the U.S. House of Representatives rejected a bill to authorise payment of the remaining US$73,000,000 owed to the Philippines for war damage claims despite support from the U.S. State Department, and Presidents Truman, Eisenhower, and Kennedy. Pelaez stated on the matter "the United States treats her friends more shabbily than those who are not with her... one has to blackmail Americans to get anything from them."

=== False implication in Stonehill scandal ===
On July 20, 1963, Justice Secretary Salvador Mariño falsely implicated Pelaez in an exposé on the Stonehill scandal broadcast on both radio and television, upon which Pelaez immediately submitted his resignation as Secretary of Foreign Affairs. On the evening of July 23, Pelaez held a contentious meeting with President Macapagal and other Liberal Party members at the Malacañang Palace, where Executive Secretary Rufino "Fenny" Hechanova incurred a furious reaction from Pelaez after explaining to him that Liberal strategists had merely intended to borrow his honor to demonstrate that the Stonehill list clamored for by the Nacionalista Party was fake. Pelaez later left the Liberal Party to switch back to the Nacionalista Party on January 15, 1964.

On November 22, 1964, Pelaez lost the Nacionalista Party nomination for President of the Philippines to Senator Marcos, who would later be elected president in 1965.

== Return to Congress ==
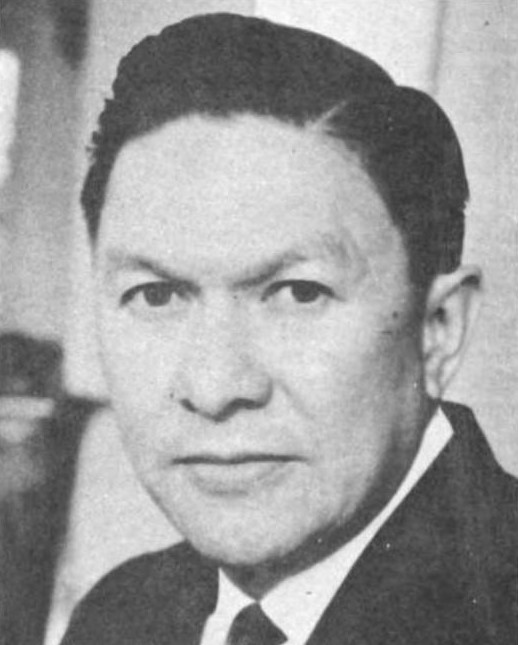
Representative Pelaez's official portrait during the 6th Congress.

In 1965, Pelaez ran as an independent candidate for the Philippine House of Representatives in the lone district of Misamis Oriental, announcing his candidacy on July 29. By November, he was elected again as representative to Congress. He ran in the 1967 Senate election and won, serving until President Ferdinand Marcos proclamated martial law on September 23, 1972. While he went back to private life and devoted his time to his family and law practice, he nevertheless continued to take an active interest in public affairs. In 1978, the 63-year-old lawyer of Misamis Oriental was elected Assemblyman in the Interim Batasang Pambansa and served as Minister of State.

=== Assassination attempt ===
On the evening of July 21, 1982, Pelaez was seated in his cream-colored limousine a few meters from his home in New Manila, Quezon City when unknown gunmen opened fire towards his vehicle. Pelaez was seriously injured with three gunshot wounds in the back and one on his left arm, while his driver of 31 years Arsenio Rogero was killed in the ambush. He managed to crawl out of the car when the gunmen left the scene, and upon calling his neighbors, he was rushed to St. Luke's Medical Center. Before Pelaez was sent to the operating room, he encountered Brig. Gen. Tomas Karingal at the hospital, to whom he said, "General, what's happening to our country? I have no known enemies."

== Diplomatic career ==
Pelaez was chair or ranking member of Philippine delegations to various international conferences among which were: the UN 10th Commemorative Conference at San Francisco in 1955; the UN General Assembly meeting in 1957 and 1962; Interparliamentary Union Conference at London in 1957; in Peru and the Cameroon in 1972. He had been a member of the consultant body of the Philippine Delegation to the SEATO in 1963. In 1973, President Marcos designated him as a member of the Philippine panel in the military bases negotiations with the United States. The RP-US Military Bases Negotiation was held in Washington, D.C. in 1975. This was his second time to serve the panel, the first time being in 1956 when he was the spokesperson of the panel in the RP-US military bases negotiations then.

On January 3, 1986, Pelaez endorsed the candidacies of Corazon Aquino and her running mate Salvador Laurel in the 1986 Philippine presidential election, stating that "It is time for us to leave the country to younger people." After the People Power Revolution overthrew the Marcos administration in February 1986, Pelaez was made Philippine ambassador to the United States of America during the Corazon Aquino administration. Pelaez served on the Committee of Honor of the Agri-Energy Roundtable (AER)- a United Nations accredited non-governmental organization and participated in the AER's ASEAN agro-industrial regional conference in May 1987 at the Manila Hotel.

== Civic leader ==
Pelaez involved himself actively in various civic and professional societies. He served as chair of the Cadang-Cadang Research Foundation of the Philippines, Inc., the first Filipino scientific research foundation jointly financed by the government and the private sector for the eradication of cadang-cadang, an infectious viral disease that had threatened to wipe out the coconut industry. He also headed the Philippine Coconut Planters Association, Mindanao-Sulu-Palawan Association and the Philippine National Red Cross Fund Drive in Mindanao (1958).

== Later life ==
After the death of his son Emmanuel Jr. on October 30, 2001, Pelaez was elected director of Acesite Hotel Corp. in January 2002 to serve out his son's remaining term at the company.

== Personal life ==
Pelaez married Edith Neri Fabella with whom he has nine children: Emmanuel Jr. (1941–2001), Ernesto, Elena, Esperanza, Eloisa, Eduardo, Enrique (born 1951), Edmundo and Elvira. A failed assassination attempt prompted him to end his political career and devote his life to Bible studies. He served twice as president of the Philippine Bible Society and chair of its board of directors, and was later made honorary president for life by the organization. He has 41 grandchildren.

Pelaez died of cardiac arrest on July 27, 2003 at the Asian Hospital and Medical Center in Muntinlupa, Metro Manila.

== Honors and legacy ==
Pelaez is considered the father of electrification, being the chairman of the National Electrification Administration for more than two decades beginning in 1969 when over three-fourths of homes nationwide were still without electricity. Thus, the most prestigious electricity or power-related award was inaugurated and was given the name of the Vice President Emmanuel Pelaez Award. The award is given to the top electrical cooperative or company that distributes electricity as a public utility.

House of Representatives of the Philippines
Preceded by Pedro Baculio	Representative, Misamis Oriental; 1949–1953	Succeeded by Ignacio S. Cruz
Preceded by Vicente Butao De Lara Sr.	Representative, Misamis Oriental; 1965–1969	Vacant Title next held by Pedro M. Roa
Political offices
Preceded by Diosdado Macapagal	Vice President of the Philippines; 1961–1965	Succeeded by Fernando López
Preceded by Felixberto M. Serrano	Secretary of Foreign Affairs; 1961–1963	Succeeded by Salvador P. López
Diplomatic posts
Preceded by Benjamin Romualdez	Philippine Ambassador to the United States; 1986–1992	Succeeded by Raul Rabe
Party political offices
Preceded by Diosdado Macapagal	Liberal nominee for Vice President of the Philippines; 1961	Succeeded by Gerardo Roxas
