= Raul Manglapus =

Filipino politician (1918–1999)

The Honorable Raul Manglapus
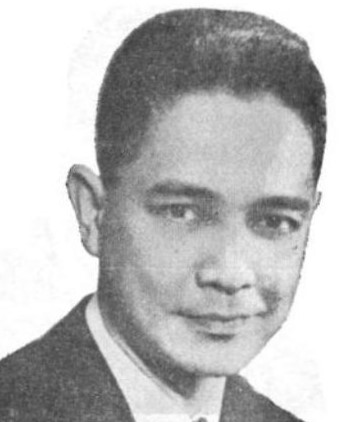
- Manglapus in 1966

Secretary of Foreign Affairs
- In office October 15, 1987 – June 30, 1992
- President: Corazon Aquino
- Preceded by: Manuel Yan
- Succeeded by: Roberto Romulo

Senator of the Philippines
- In office June 30, 1987 – October 9, 1987
- In office December 30, 1961 – December 30, 1967

Personal details
- Born: Raul Sevilla Manglapus; October 20, 1918 Ermita, Manila, Philippine Islands
- Died: July 25, 1999 (aged 80) Muntinlupa, Philippines
- Party: Lakas (1992–1999)
- Other political affiliations: NUCD (1968–1992); Liberal (1966–1968); Progressive (1957–1966); Nacionalista (until 1957)
- Spouse: Pacita La'O
- Education: Ateneo de Manila (AB); University of Santo Tomas (LLB)
- Occupation: Politician, songwriter

Raul Sevilla Manglapus (October 20, 1918 – July 25, 1999) was a prominent post–World War II Filipino politician and songwriter. He co-founded the reformist Progressive Party of the Philippines and the Christian Democratic Socialist Movement in 1968 (later renamed the National Union of Christian Democrats).

He was elected to the Senate by a landslide in 1961 and ran for president in 1965, but lost to eventual winner Ferdinand Marcos. He once again became Secretary of Foreign Affairs under President Corazon Aquino in 1987.

His name is inscribed on the wall of the Philippines' Bantayog ng mga Bayani, which honors the heroes and martyrs who fought authoritarian rule. However, Manglapus has also drawn the ire of feminist movements for his preconceived notions and controversial sexist remarks during his lifetime.

== Early years ==
Manglapus spent his formative years in the Ateneo de Manila. In 1939, he served as editor-in-chief of the school publication, The Guidon. It was during this time that he was acquainted with Manuel Manahan, rural reform advocate and later colleague in the Senate. In fact, Manahan served as editor-in-chief of the Guidon before Manglapus. The two became long-time friends and were later running-mates for the 1965 presidential elections under the Party for Philippine Progress (PPP). Manglapus graduated from the Ateneo de Manila AB '39 summa cum laude and excelled in oratory. His prize-winning oration, "In Defense of the Tao", (the Common Man), capped extraordinary scholastic achievements which earned him the respect of President Manuel L. Quezon who attended the contest for the sole purpose of hearing Manglapus speak. He then attended law school at the University of Santo Tomas and took the bar exam in November 1946, becoming a lawyer a few months later.

During World War II Manglapus was the voice in the "Voice of Freedom" broadcasts from the beleaguered Filipino-American forces on Bataan and Corregidor, serving under Gen. Douglas MacArthur. He was tortured to the brink of death by the Japanese in Fort Santiago. He was a member of the Philippine delegation who witnessed the signing of the Instrument of Surrender by the Japanese on board the USS Missouri on September 2, 1945.

== Political career ==
=== Early political career ===
He first came to prominence from his association with Defense Secretary Ramon Magsaysay, the one-time mechanic turned populist President of the Philippines. In 1953, Manglapus composed for the presidential candidate Magsaysay the catchy campaign jingle "Mambo Magsaysay", which became widely popular and was credited in some quarters as aiding immensely in the election of Magsaysay.

Manglapus remained, until the end of his life, a prolific composer and musical performer. His compositions, distinctive for their martial lilt, included, besides, a college rallying march, Blue Eagle the King, whose music were later borrowed and adapted by his alma Mater, Ateneo.

He was also the leader of the Executive Combo Band, a jazz band composed mainly of his peers which performed for Pope John Paul II at the Vatican in 1995. He jammed with jazz giant Duke Ellington, and prominent jazz-inclined politicians such as U.S. President Bill Clinton, Amelita Ramos—wife of President Fidel V. Ramos, and King Bhumibol Adulyadej of Thailand. Later in life, Manglapus would serve as chairman of the Filipino Society of Composers, Authors and Publishers (FILSCAP).

A linguist and a snappy dresser, he sometimes conveyed the persona of an upstart elitist, further highlighted by his fluent American-tinged accent hallmarked by his education at the Ateneo de Manila, which awarded him an honorary doctor of laws degree in 1965. The lack of a traditional political machinery to support him contributed to early electoral defeats. He also did not have plenty of allies, often distancing himself from other senators due to his elitist personality, though this did not prevent him from cooperating with them in his post-Martial Law career. Nonetheless, by the time of the presidency of Ferdinand Marcos, he had attained prominence and stability in the Filipino political arena.

=== During martial law ===
"You [United States] need not force a country to turn democratic. You need only, in most cases, to allow it to return to democracy. You need only to resist what appears to be your current driving impulse, in spite of the lessons of Greece, Portugal and now Indochina, to support dictators in the name of stability, and incidentally, of profits."

— Excerpt from Manglapus' speech before Asian specialists in Washington, D.C., April 1975

Manglapus was on a speaking engagement in the United States when Marcos declared martial law in 1972. Marcos refused to allow his wife and children to join him in exile, and they were forced to flee the country by through a complicated route, leapfrogging even by small raft to freedom.

Manglapus remained in exile for 14 years, dissuaded by an outstanding warrant of arrest should he return to the country. Even in exile, Manglapus remained as one of the Filipino opposition leaders after Benigno Aquino Jr., Jovito Salonga and Jose W. Diokno.

During his years as an expatriate, Manglapus founded the Movement for a Free Philippines (MFP). In July 1974, his musical comedy Manifest Destiny was first staged in Honolulu, Hawaii. He served as president of Democracy International, an organization of exiled world leaders seeking the restoration of democratic institutions in their respective countries, and president of the Washington-based International Center for Development Policy from 1981 to 1986.

In an interview in March 1981, he voiced his strong revulsion of Marcos' violation of the Constitution and his manipulation of the political scene as a ploy to the declaration of martial law as a means to entrench himself and his cronies:

"Martial law pure and simple has been a facade masking the exploitation of our people and their natural resources by Marcos, his family and close friends. Any benefits, and there have been few, that have reached the people have been accidental and not the result of deliberate martial law policy."

=== Return to the Philippines ===
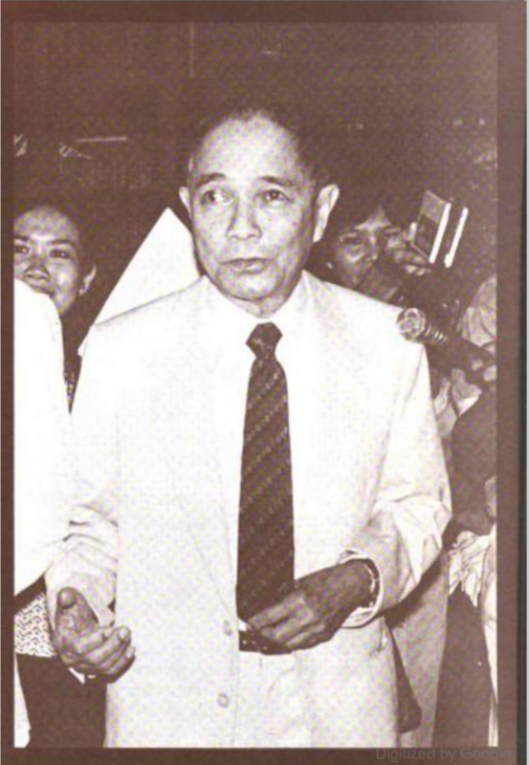
Raul Manglapus as Secretary of Foreign Affairs, photograph released by the Philippine Congress, c. 1988

Manglapus immediately returned to the Philippines upon the ouster of Marcos and the accession to the presidency of Corazon Aquino in 1986. He was elected to the Philippine Senate in 1987, but resigned before his term expired to serve once again as Secretary of Foreign Affairs for President Aquino.

A longtime critic of the American military presence, he pressed for a considerable increase in U.S. military aid and general economic assistance in exchange for extending the operations of U.S. military bases in the country, signing compromise agreements in this effort with the United States that was later rejected by the Philippine Senate in 1991, which resulted in the U.S. military pulling out by the end of 1992. He also courted controversy after a remark he made during a Senate hearing on the rape of Filipina domestic workers during the Iraqi invasion of Kuwait in 1990. He quipped, to general outrage, that if rape were inevitable, one should relax and enjoy it. Despite the subsequent political firestorm, Manglapus weathered widespread calls for his resignation.

After the election of his close associate Fidel V. Ramos as president in 1992, Manglapus lowered his political profile, while retaining powerful positions such as chairman of the Philippine National Oil Company and the Lakas-National Union of Christian Democrats (NUCD), Ramos' political party. Manglapus had established the Christian Democratic Socialist Movement in 1968, a party which eventually reorganized as the NUCD. Manglapus fostered ties with the other Christian Democratic parties in the world, such as that in Germany.

As senator and government official, he promoted land reform and battled corruption. He was also a foremost nationalist and human rights advocate. Commenting on his unsuccessful bid for the presidency, a writer wrote: "Raúl Manglapus was one of the leading Filipino intellectuals of his generation and a politician with wide appeal. It was the Philippines' misfortune that Ferdinand Marcos, equally able but lacking in principles, won the presidency rather than someone like Manglapus."

== Electoral history ==
Electoral history of Raul Manglapus
Year	Office	Party	Votes received				Result
Year	Office	Party	Total	%	P.	Swing	Result
1957	Senator of the Philippines	Progressive	1,005,595	19.69%	12th	—N/a	Lost
1959	Senator of the Philippines	Progressive	1,651,097	25.82%	11th	—N/a	Lost
1961	Senator of the Philippines	Progressive	3,489,658	51.78%	1st	—N/a	Won
1987	Senator of the Philippines	NUCD	9,910,244	43.58%	16th	—N/a	Won
1965	President of the Philippines	Progressive	384,564	5.17%	3rd	—N/a	Lost

== Personal life ==
He was married to Pacita La'O. His father was Congressman Valentin Manglapus of Ilocos Sur, and his mother was Justina Sevilla of Malabon, Rizal.

== Death ==
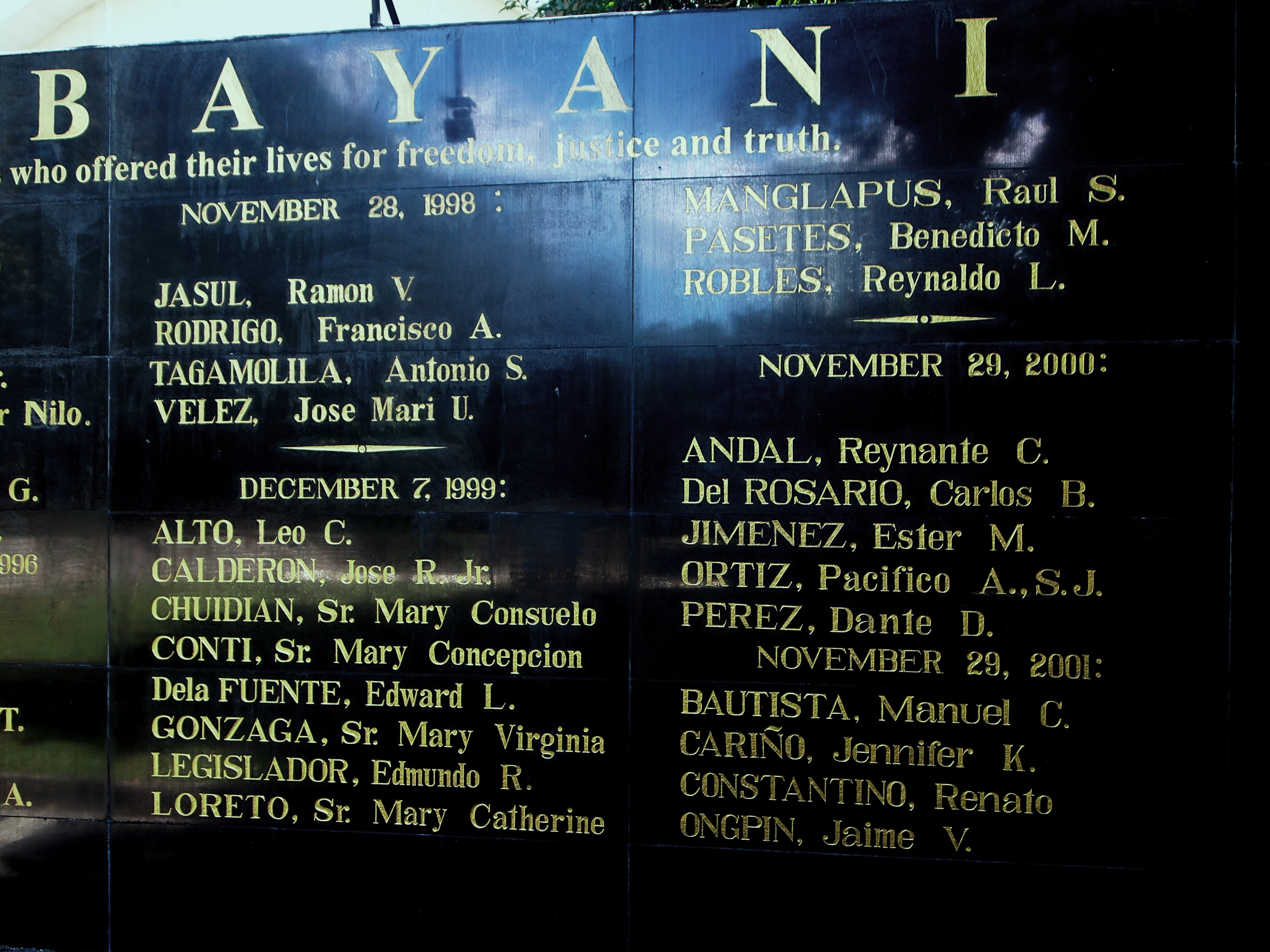
Detail of the Wall of Remembrance at the Bantayog ng mga Bayani, showing names from the 1999 batch of Bantayog Honorees, including that of Raul Manglapus

Manglapus died on July 25, 1999, from throat cancer.
