= 1965 Philippine Senate election =

19th Philippine senatorial election

- November 9, 1965

8 (of the 24) seats in the Senate 13 seats needed for a majority
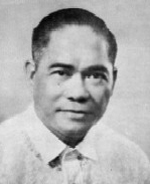

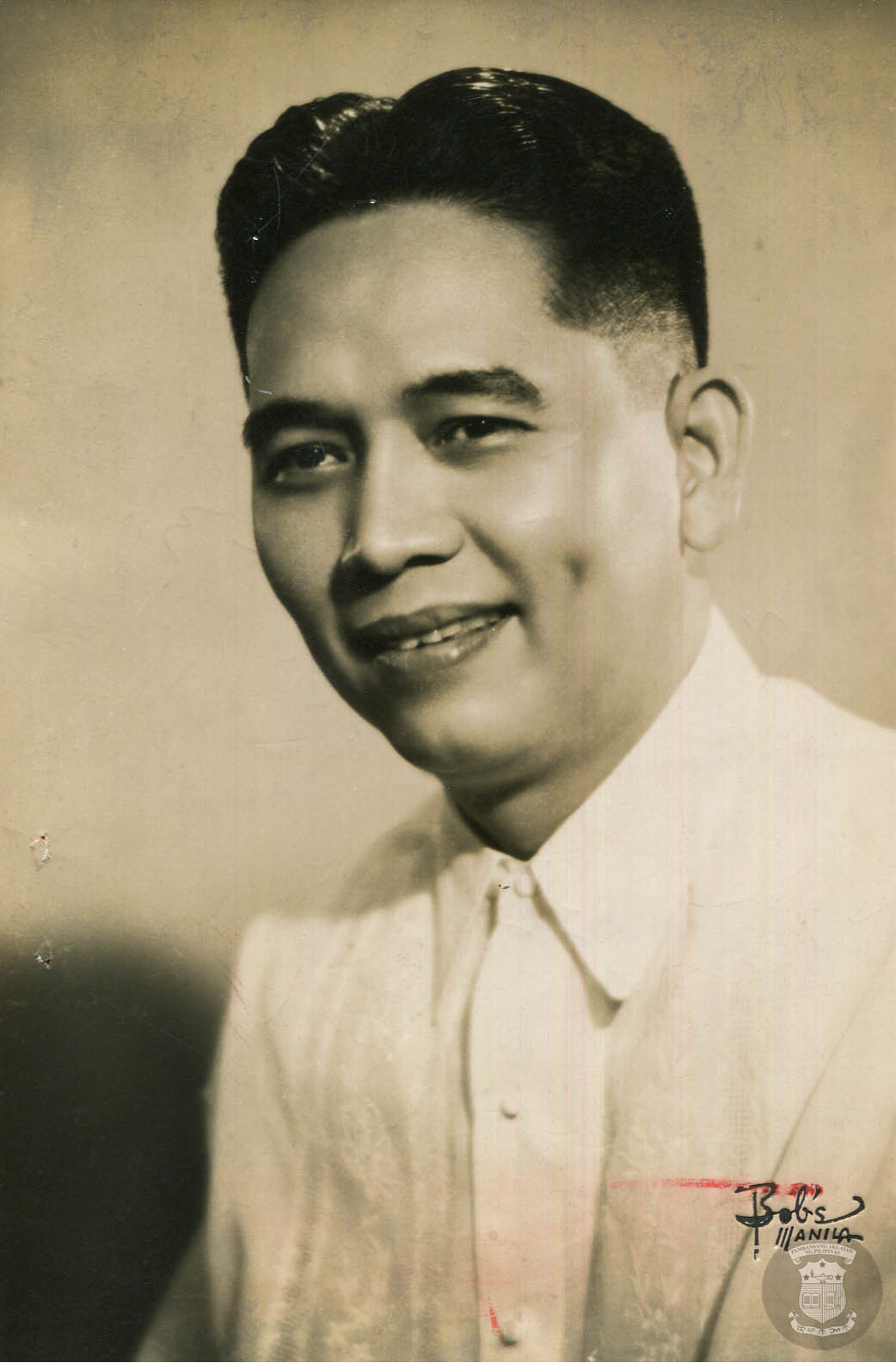

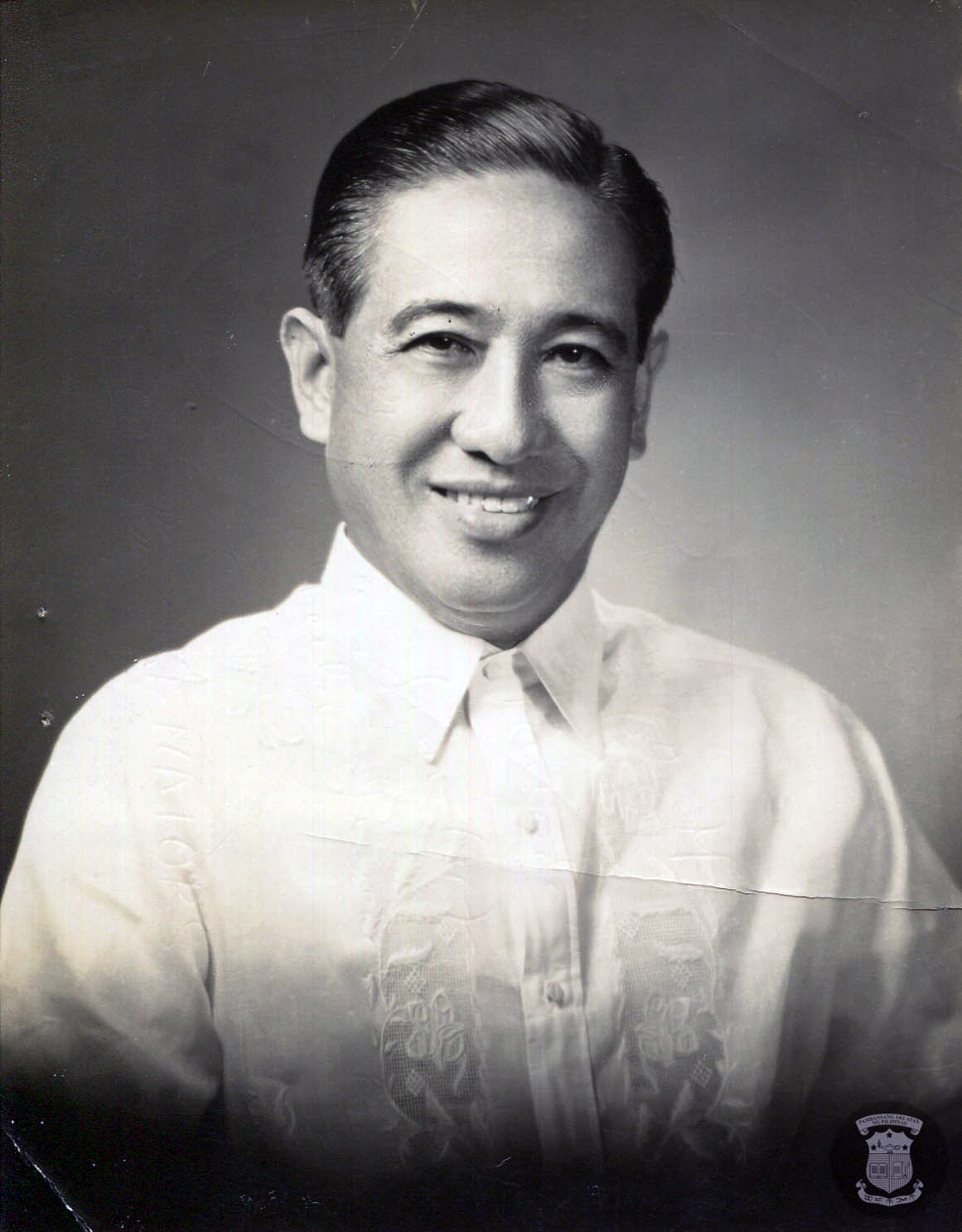
	First party	Second party	Third party
Leader	Arturo Tolentino	Ambrosio Padilla	Lorenzo Tañada
Party	Nacionalista	Liberal	NCP
Seats before	10 (4 up)	9 (1 up)	1 (1 up)
Seats won	5	2	1
Seats after	11	10	1
Seat change	▲1	▲3	0
Popular vote	21,619,502	23,158,197	3,014,618
Percentage	43.80	46.92	6.11
Swing	▼6.36	▼2.83	▲6.11
Senate President before election
Ferdinand Marcos
Nacionalista
Elected Senate President
Arturo Tolentino
Nacionalista

The 19th election of members to the Senate of the Philippines was held on November 9, 1965. The Nacionalista Party wrestled back control of the Senate; originally a Liberal, Senate President Ferdinand Marcos defected to the Nacionalistas, became their presidential candidate and won this year's election.

After the election, the Senate emerged with 12 Liberals on one side, and 11 Nacionalistas and 1 Nationalist Citizens' Party caucusing with them on the other.

== Electoral system ==
Philippine Senate elections are held via plurality block voting with staggered elections, with the country as an at-large district. The Senate has 24 seats, of which 8 seats are up every 2 years. The eight seats up were last contested in 1959; each voter has eight votes and can vote up to eight names, of which the eight candidates with the most votes winning the election.

== Retiring incumbents ==
1. Fernando Lopez (Nacionalista), ran for vice president and won
2. Ferdinand Marcos (Nacionalista), ran for president and won

=== Mid-term vacancies ===
1. Mariano Jesús Cuenco (Nacionalista), died on February 25, 1964
2. Eulogio Rodriguez (Nacionalista), died on December 9, 1964

=== Other incumbents running elsewhere ===
These ran in the middle of their Senate terms. For those losing in their respective elections, they can still return to the Senate to serve out their term, while the winners will vacate their Senate seats, then it would have been contested in a special election concurrently with the next general election.

1. Gerardo Roxas (Liberal), ran for vice president and lost

== Results ==
The Nacionalista Party won five seats, the Liberal Party won two seats, and the Nationalist Citizens' Party (NCP) won one.

NCP's Lorenzo Tañada, and Nacionalistas Alejandro Almendras and Genaro Magsaysay all defended their seats.

Five winners are neophyte senators. These are Dominador Aytona, Eva Estrada Kalaw, and Wenceslao Lagumbay of the Nacionalistas, and Liberals Sergio Osmeña Jr. and Jovito Salonga.

Estanislao Fernandez of the Liberal Party lost his seat.

	1	2	3	4	5	6	7	8	9	10	11	12	13	14	15	16	17	18	19	20	21	22	23	24
Before election											‡	‡^	‡^	‡	‡	‡	‡	‡						
Election result	Not up										LP		NCP	NP					Not up					
After election											*	+	√	+	*	*	√	√						

Key:

- ‡ Seats up
- + Gained by a party from another party
- √ Held by the incumbent
- * Held by the same party with a new senator
- ^ Vacancy

=== Per candidate ===
Candidate	Party	Votes	%
Jovito Salonga	Liberal Party	3,629,834	47.70
Alejandro Almendras	Nacionalista Party	3,472,689	45.63
Genaro Magsaysay	Nacionalista Party	3,463,459	45.51
Sergio Osmeña Jr.	Liberal Party	3,234,966	42.51
Eva Estrada-Kalaw	Nacionalista Party	3,190,700	41.93
Dominador Aytona	Nacionalista Party	3,037,666	39.92
Lorenzo Tañada	Nationalist Citizens' Party	3,014,618	39.61
Wenceslao Lagumbay	Nacionalista Party	2,972,525	39.06
Cesar Climaco	Liberal Party	2,968,958	39.01
Estanislao Fernandez	Liberal Party	2,846,320	37.40
Constancio Castañeda	Nacionalista Party	2,814,032	36.98
Ramon Bagatsing	Liberal Party	2,774,621	36.46
Bartolome Cabangbang	Nacionalista Party	2,668,431	35.06
Alejandro Roces	Liberal Party	2,663,852	35.00
Ramon Diaz	Liberal Party	2,620,073	34.43
Lucas Paredes	Liberal Party	2,419,573	31.79
Vicente Araneta	Party for Philippine Progress	500,795	6.58
Amelio Mutuc	Independent	413,074	5.43
Jose Feria	Party for Philippine Progress	335,119	4.40
Benjamin Gaston	Party for Philippine Progress	149,057	1.96
Dionisio Ojeda	Party for Philippine Progress	143,681	1.89
Magdaleno Estrada	New Leaf Party	8,766	0.12
Epifanio Talania	Partido ng Bansa	3,007	0.04
Vicente Baldovino	Partido ng Bansa	1,945	0.03
German Carbonel	Partido ng Bansa	1,830	0.02
Toribia S. Valino	Partido ng Bansa	1,750	0.02
Jose Villavisa	Partido ng Bansa	1,604	0.02
Teodoro Gosuico Sr.	Partido ng Bansa	1,153	0.02
Genovevo Baynosa	New Leaf Party	1,101	0.01
Leoncio Wico Pagdanganan	Partido ng Bansa	113	0.00
Total		49,355,312	100.00
Total votes		7,610,051	–
Registered voters/turnout		9,962,345	76.39

=== Per party ===
Party	Votes	%	+/–	Seats				
Party	Votes	%	+/–	Up	Before	Won	After	+/−
Liberal Party	23,158,197	46.92	−2.83	1	9	2	10	+1
Nacionalista Party	21,619,502	43.80	−6.36	4	10	5	11	+1
Nationalist Citizens' Party	3,014,618	6.11	New	1	1	1	1	0
Party for Philippine Progress	1,128,652	2.29	New	0	2	0	2	0
Partido ng Bansa	11,402	0.02	New	0	0	0	0	0
New Leaf Party	9,867	0.02	New	0	0	0	0	0
Independent	413,074	0.84	+0.76	0	0	0	0	0
Vacancy				2	2	0	0	−2
Total	49,355,312	100.00	–	8	24	8	24	0
Total votes	7,610,051	–						
Registered voters/turnout	9,962,345	76.39						

Vote share
LP	46.92%
NP	43.80%
NCP	6.11%
PPP	2.29%
Others	0.88%

Senate seats
LP	25.00%
NP	62.50%
NCP	12.50%
PPP	0.00%
Others	0.00%

== Defeated incumbents ==
1. Estanislao Fernandez (Liberal), appointed as associate justice of the Supreme Court in 1973, ran for member of parliament from Region IV–A in 1978 and won

== See also ==
- Commission on Elections
- 6th Congress of the Philippines
