= Environmental issues in the Philippines =

Environmental problems in the Philippines include pollution, mining and logging, deforestation, threats to environmental activists, dynamite fishing, landslides, coastal erosion, biodiversity loss, extinction, global warming and climate change Environmental issues include major challenges like climate change, plastic pollution, deforestation, water and air pollution, and loss of biodiversity. These problems are driven by human activities such as industrial emissions, deforestation for agriculture, and excessive consumption, leading to consequences like extreme weather, habitat destruction, and negative health effects. Addressing these issues requires reducing harmful pollutants, transitioning to sustainable practices, and implementing global and local policies.

Due to the paucity of extant documents, a complete history of land use in the archipelago remains unwritten. However, relevant data shows destructive land use increased significantly in the eighteenth century when Spanish colonialism enhanced its extraction of the archipelago's resources for the early modern global market. The Philippines is projected to be one of the most vulnerable countries to the impacts of climate change, which would exacerbate weather extremes. As the Philippines lies on the Pacific Ring of Fire, it is prone to natural disasters, like earthquakes, typhoons, and volcanic eruptions.

In 2021, the Philippines ranked the fourth most affected country from "weather-related loss events", partly due to the close proximity of major infrastructure and residential areas to the coast and unreliable government support. One of the most devastating typhoons to hit the archipelago was Typhoon Haiyan, known locally as Yolanda, in 2013 that killed 6,300 people and left 28,689 injured.

Congress passed the Clean Air Act of 1999, the Philippine Clean Water Act of 2004, the Climate Change Act of 2009 to address environmental issues. The country is also a signatory to the Paris Agreement. However, research has found that outside of cities, the general public doesn't feel equally informed. Environmental activists and land defenders, consisting mostly of Indigenous communities who have been attempting to bring attention to the environmental issues in the country have been met with violence or murder. As a result, the Philippines has been ranked one of the most dangerous places in the world for environmental activists. It also has one of the highest percentages of climate change denialists in the world.

== Climate change ==
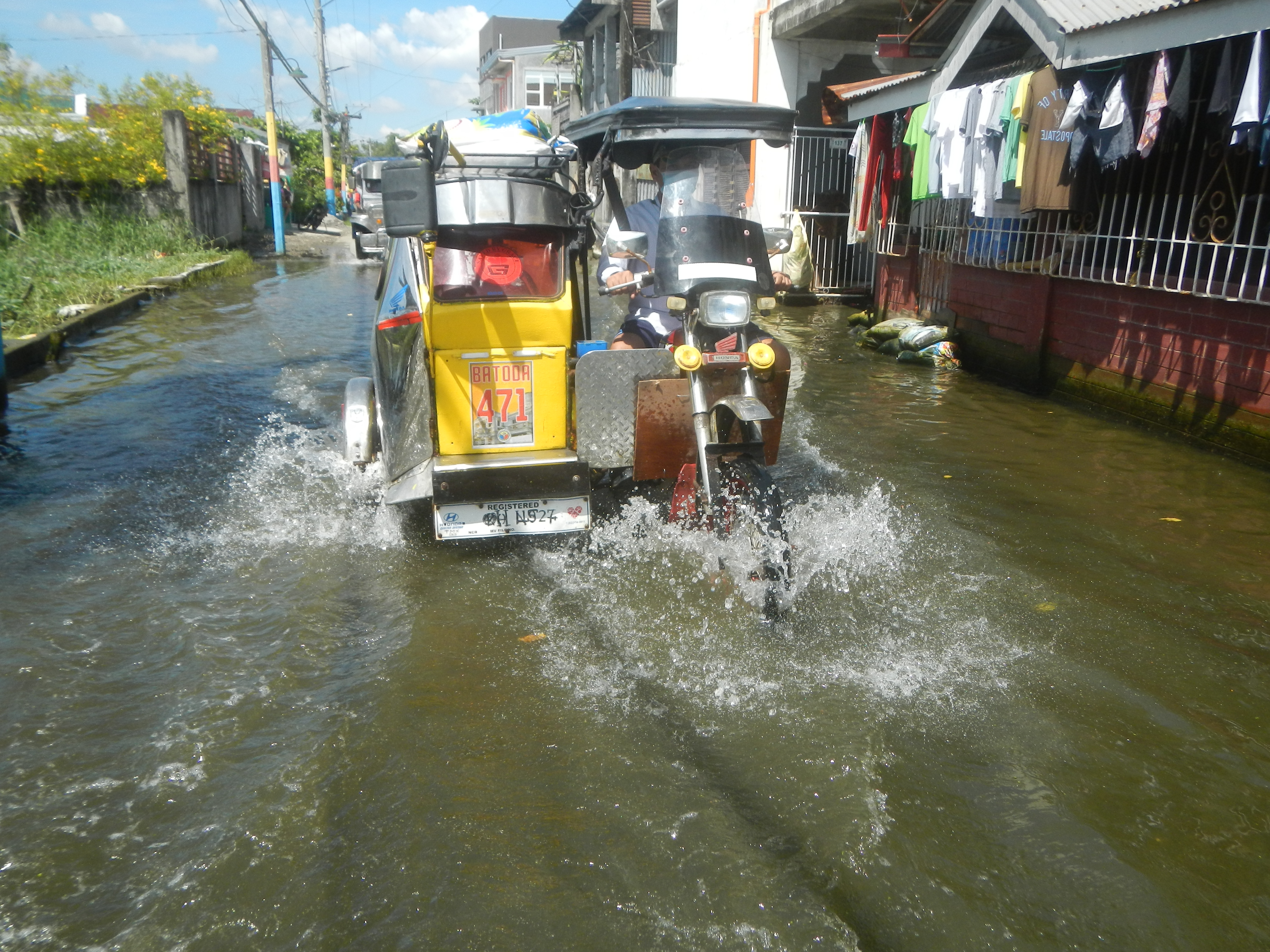
Both floods and droughts are predicted to increase.

Climate change is having serious impacts in the Philippines such as increased frequency and severity of natural disasters, sea level rise, extreme rainfall, resource shortages, and environmental degradation. All of these impacts together have greatly affected the Philippines' agriculture, water, infrastructure, human health, and coastal ecosystems and they are projected to continue having devastating damages to the economy and society of the Philippines.

According to the UN Office for the Coordination of Humanitarian Affairs (OCHA), the Philippines is one of the most disaster-prone countries in the world. The archipelago is situated along the Pacific Ocean's typhoon belt, leaving the country vulnerable to around 20 typhoons each year, a quarter of which are destructive. The December 2021 typhoon known colloquially as Typhoon Odette caused almost one billion US$ (₱47.6 billion) in infrastructure, housing, and agricultural damages and displaced 114,943 people. The United Nations Development Programme (UNDP) reported in 2022 that Typhoon Odette affected the lives of 9.9 million people. More tragically, the physical and economic repercussions of Typhoon Odette led to the death of 407 people as of December 2022.

In addition to the Philippines' close proximity to the Pacific Ocean's typhoon belt, the Philippines is also located within the "Pacific Ring of Fire" which makes the country prone to recurrent earthquakes and volcanic eruptions. Compounding these issues, the impacts of climate change, such as accelerated sea level rise, exacerbate the state's high susceptibility to natural disasters, like flooding and landslides. Aside from geography, climate change impacts regions with a history of colonization more intensely than regions without a history of colonization. Colonized regions experience the repercussions of climate change most jarringly "because of their high dependence on natural resources, their geographical and climatic conditions and their limited capacity to effectively adapt to a changing climate." Since low-income countries have a history of colonialism and resource exploitation, their environment lacks the diversity necessary to prevail against natural disasters. A lack of biodiversity reduces the resilience of a specific region, leaving them more susceptible to natural disasters and the effects of climate change. With its history of Spanish colonization, the Philippines is not environmentally nor economically equipped to overcome issues it is currently dealing with, such as natural disasters and climate change. This inability to recover exacerbates the problem, creating a cycle of environmental and economic devastation in the country.

The Philippines, an archipelago of over 7,000 islands, is exceptionally vulnerable to the impacts of climate change. Rising sea levels threaten coastal communities, leading to increased flooding and displacement. Extreme weather events, such as typhoons, are becoming more frequent and intense, causing widespread destruction and economic losses. Changes in rainfall patterns disrupt agricultural cycles, impacting food security and livelihoods. The country's rich biodiversity is also at risk, as changing temperatures and ocean acidification affect ecosystems and marine life. Addressing climate change in the Philippines requires a multifaceted approach, including mitigation efforts to reduce greenhouse gas emissions, adaptation strategies to build resilience, and international cooperation to support vulnerable nations.

== Air pollution ==
Air pollution causes significant health and economic problems in the Philippines. An estimated 67,000 deaths annually have been directly linked to air pollution.

The Department of Environment and Natural Resources is tasked with implementing the Clean Air Act of 1999 to monitor and prevent air pollution in the country.

== Deforestation ==
Over the course of the twentieth century, the forest cover of the Philippines dropped from 70 percent down to 20 percent. In total, 46 species are endangered, and 4 have been eradicated completely. Only 3.2 percent of total rainforest is left. Based on an analysis of land use pattern maps and a road map, an estimated 9.8 million acres of forests were lost in the Philippines from 1934 to 1988. As of 2015, the country's forest cover has been reduced to just 7 million hectares.

According to IBON Foundation, deforestation is caused by logging, mining, and land conversion for corporate agriculture, cash crops, real estate, and infrastructure. Illegal logging occurs in the Philippines and intensifies flood damage in some areas.

According to scholar Jessica Mathews, short-sighted policies by the Filipino government have contributed to the high rate of deforestation:

The government regularly granted logging concessions of less than ten years. Since it takes 30–35 years for a second-growth forest to mature, loggers had no incentive to replant. Compounding the error, flat royalties encouraged the loggers to remove only the most valuable species. A horrendous 40 percent of the harvestable lumber never left the forests but, having been damaged in the logging, rotted or was burned in place. The unsurprising result of these and related policies is that out of 17 million hectares of closed forests that flourished early in the century only 1.2 million remain today.

The Philippines had a 2018 Forest Landscape Integrity Index mean score of 5.91/10, ranking it 91st globally out of 172 countries.

== Water pollution ==
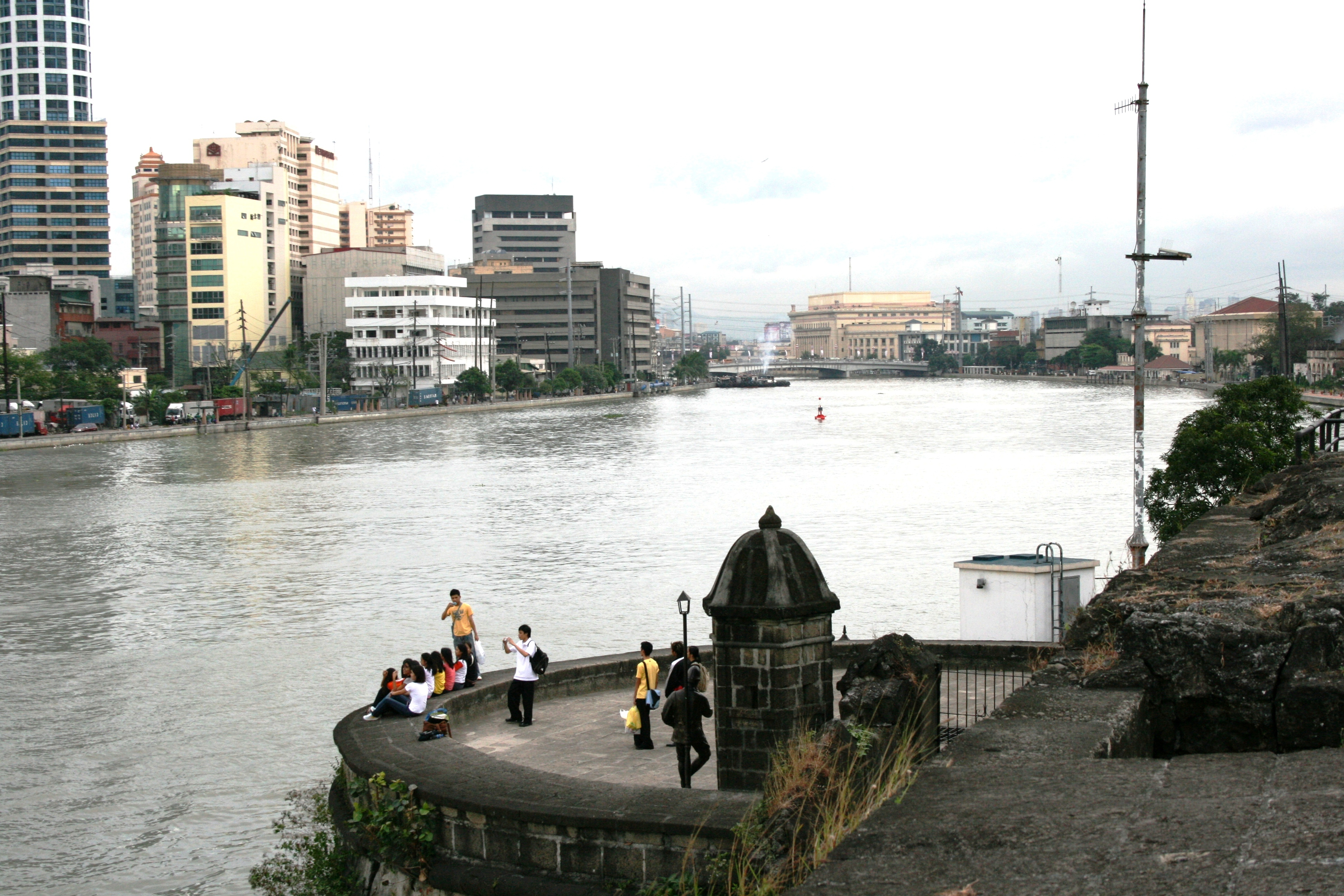
The Pasig River in Manila, one of the world's most polluted rivers.

The Philippines has abundant water resources, with an average availability of 5,302 m^{3} per capita per year. However, water scarcity issues arise in certain regions and particularly in specific seasons. Approximately 58% of groundwater samples are contaminated, indicating significant pollution. The main source of pollution is untreated domestic and industrial wastewater. Roughly 36% of Philippine river systems are considered suitable for public water supply. As of 2023, 48% of the population had access to safely managed or piped water services.

By 2025, water availability is projected to be marginal in most major cities and in 8 of the 19 major river basins. Besides severe health concerns, water pollution also leads to problems in the fishing and tourism industries. The national government recognized the problem and since 2004 has sought to introduce sustainable water resources development management (see below).

Roughly 5% of the population is connected to a sewer network. The vast majority uses flush toilets connected to septic tanks. Since sludge treatment and disposal facilities are rare, most effluents are discharged into the ecosystem without treatment. According to the Asian Development Bank, the Pasig River is one of the world's most polluted rivers, running through the capital city of Manila. In March 2008, Manila Water announced that a wastewater treatment plant will be constructed in Taguig.

In 2006, The first constructed wetland serving about 700 households was completed in a peri-urban area of Bayawan. Serving approximately 700 households, it was part of a program to resettle families that lived along the coast in informal settlements who had no access to safe water supply and sanitation facilities.

A 2023 study estimated that the Pasig River contributed up to 63,700 metric tons of plastic into the ocean each year—the second largest relative to its size.

== Destructive fishing ==
=== General ===
Commercial fishing is causing environmental problems, exhausting food supply, and threatening livelihoods in the Philippines and around the world. The Philippines has a strong fishing culture due to its historically productive and diverse marine ecosystems. In 2018, 927,617 people were officially reported as being involved in "capture fishing", and fish contributes to 50% of a Filipinos protein consumption. This fish reliance has contributed to the current overfishing of 70% of Philippine fishing grounds and about 40% of fish caught being done illegally. Coastal communities and local fishers organized themselves to implement sustainable fishing practices and protect fishing grounds from commercial fishing fleets that are destroying marine habitats.

COVID-19 lockdowns seem to have allowed an increase in illegal fishing. Karagatan Patrol ships using VIIRS (visible infrared imaging lure lights) have detected an increase in apparent commercial fishing vessels from 3,602 in February 2020 (before COVID-19 lockdowns) to 5,950 in March, which went back down to 1,666 in May when lockdown eased. These vessels were detected in waters that only allow small artisanal fishermen using passive fishing methods, due to the area being a spawning ground for most fish species.

Even after COVID-19, VIIRS (Visible Infrared Imaging Radiometer Suite) technology has tracked a surge in suspected illegal [fishing] activity. The data show a steady upward trend in illegal fishing, with VIIRS Boat Detections (VBDs) rising by 9% from 2022 to 2023 and further increasing by 10.5% in 2024.

=== Dynamite and cyanide fishing ===
Dynamite fishing, cyanide fishing, and bottom trawling are fishing methods that cause extensive damage to coral reefs. These practices are major threats to Philippine marine life and ecosystems.

Dynamite fishing, also known as blast fishing and fish bombing, was outlawed in 1932. It is a practice of throwing bombs into the water to kill and stun the fish caught in the blast, and then collecting the fish. The process kills both fish eggs and fish too young to sell. It also destroys the surrounding habitat, including coral reefs in the area. This damage is estimated to have cause $99.2 billion in losses a year, according to a study by Rhodora Azanza of the University of the Philippines. As such, average fish yields have been reported to be decreasing. Jimely Flores, a senior marine scientist for Oceana, described the situation saying, "In some dynamited areas, if you dive you don't see any fish at all."

Commercial fishing vessels have used cyanide to stun and capture coral reef fish in the Philippines.

== Solid waste ==
=== General ===
According to Metro Manila Development Authority (MMDA), the country produces an average of 41 kilotons of garbage daily with almost 10 kilotons/day coming from Metro Manila alone. As of May 2024, there are 296 garbage disposal sites in the Philippines.

While most local government units establish a Material Recovery Facility (MRF), implement segregation at the source, and collect and process all recyclable and biodegradable materials, most of the municipal solid wastes are either disposed in the dump sites or openly burned, which further worsen the quality of heavy polluted air in the cities.

Republic Act No. 9003 or the "Ecological Solid Waste Management Act of 2000" provides for a solid waste management program. It orders the adoption of sanitary landfills and the closure of dangerous open dump sites.

In September 2025, regional environmental bodies convened an environmental summit emphasizing waste-to-resource strategies: recycling, waste-to-energy, community-based solid-waste management, showing a policy shift from disposal to circular management. The Philippine Clean Air Act prohibits the incineration of waste that "emits poisonous or toxic fumes".

=== Plastic ===
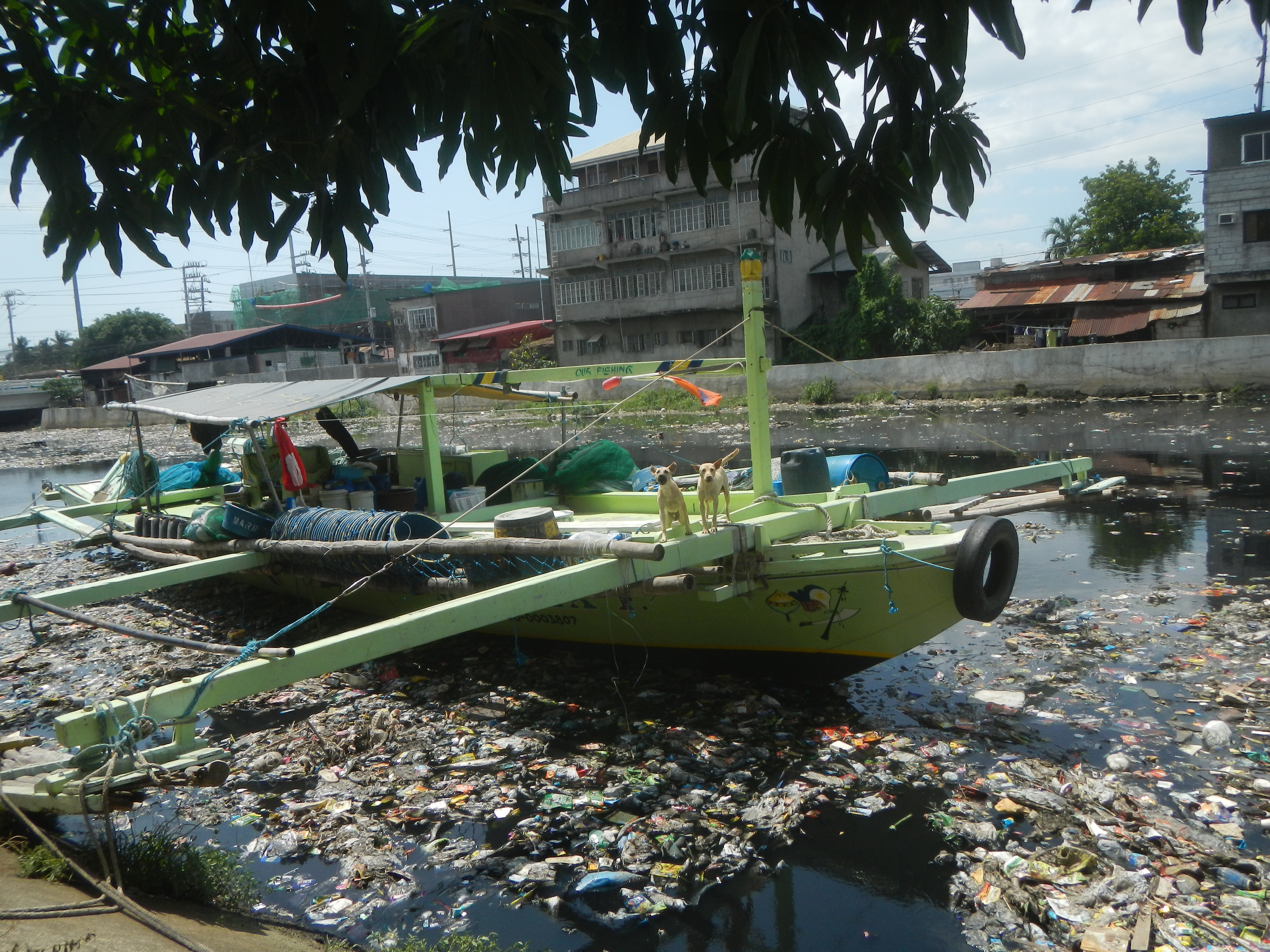
Plastic pollution in the Marilao River

According to World Bank calculations, the Philippines generates 2.7 million tons of plastic waste every year. Around 20% of the plastic waste makes its way to the sea. One estimate ranks the Philippines as the world's third largest producer of oceanic plastic waste. The Pasig River deposits 72,000 tons of plastic into the sea annually, mostly during monsoons, placing it among the world's top 10 rivers that bring plastic waste to the sea. A 2023 study by The Ocean Cleanup found that the Pasig River is responsible for roughly 63,700 metric tons of plastic entering the ocean each year, accounting for over 6% of global riverine plastic emissions. Nationally, the Philippines produces approximately 2.15 to 2.7 million metric tons of plastic annually, with only about 9–12% being recycled.

In response, the Philippine government enacted the Extended Producer Responsibility (EPR) Act of 2022, which requires large companies to recover and divert 80% of their plastic packaging waste by 2028. Local government units have also implemented plastic bag bans and bottle recovery programs in Metro Manila and other major cities. Plastic waste has significant ecological and economic impacts, including the degradation of marine habitats, ingestion of plastics by fish and seabirds, and reduced water quality. These issues affect coastal communities that depend on fishing and tourism for livelihood.

== Government response ==
The Philippine government has implemented several policies and programs to address water pollution and improve water quality across the country. Under the Clean Water Act of 2004, Water Quality Management Areas (WQMAs) were established as designated zones where local government units collaborate to manage water bodies, aiming to reduce pollution and enhance water quality.

Additionally, in 2019, the Department of Environment and Natural Resources (DENR) has also launched the National Sewerage and Septage Management Program (NSSMP), focusing on the improvement of wastewater infrastructure. Including the construction of sewer systems and septage treatment facilities.

Despite these efforts, challenges remain. A significant portion of the population lacks access to proper sanitation facilities, and untreated wastewater continues to enter rivers and coastal areas. Enforcement of environmental regulations has been inconsistent, allowing illegal dumping and industrial discharge to persist. Financial and technical limitations further hinder the expansion and maintenance of water treatment facilities, particularly in rural and underserved areas.

As of early 2025, the government, through the Department of Environment and Natural Resources (DENR), has ramped up efforts to restore and protect coastal ecosystems via the National Blue Carbon Action Partnership (NBCAP). This includes restoring mangroves and other “blue-carbon” habitats to enhance coastal resilience, biodiversity, and community livelihoods.

Government reporting to the Convention on Biological Diversity has referenced projects implemented by Conservation International Philippines as part of biodiversity-corridor and seascape initiatives.

== Impact on local communities ==
With 7,640 islands, the Philippines bares a diverse multitude of local communities. These communities face substantial consequences as many of them depend on bodies of water for their livelihoods and daily needs. Contaminated water sources contribute to outbreaks of waterborne diseases (e.g., cholera, typhoid, and dysentery). Limited access to clean water exacerbates these health risks, affecting particularly vulnerable populations, including children and the elderly.

Economically, pollution also impacts aquaculture. With 1.9 million registered small-scaled fishers, the Philippines is heavily reliant on fishing as a source of income and employment. Pollution reduces income and limits employment opportunities. In some rural areas, persistent water pollution has forced Filipinos to relocate, disrupting social infrastructure. Additionally, educational outcomes can also be impacted, as waterborne illnesses lead to higher absenteeism among children. To mitigate these impacts, local communities have organized clean-up drives, promoted water conservation practices, and collaborated with non-governmental organizations (NGOs) to advocate for better waste management policies and infrastructure support.

In Cabangan, Zambales, for example, Alon & Araw Club, a nonprofit and non-governmental organization (NGOs), has been active in empowering coastal children and improving the coastal environment. Alon & Araw operates programs that combine environmental education, beach clean-ups, plastic upcycling and recycling programs (including exchanging plastic for incentives), and surfing lessons to engage youth in waste reduction and restoration of the coast of Cabangan. So far, in 2025, Alon & Araw have collected over 19,000 kilograms of recyclable plastic.

== Rising sea levels ==
One of the problems of environmental issues is about the sea level rise. Sea level rise is an increase in the level of the world's oceans due to the effects of global warming. Burning fossil fuels is one of the causes of global warming because it releases carbon dioxide and other heat-trapping gasses into the atmosphere. The oceans then absorb the majority of this heat. Sea levels are rising as a result of climate change. This rise is likely to accelerate over the coming century and continue for centuries. The impacts of sea level rise include permanent flooding (inundation) of low-lying areas, and increased frequency, extent and depth of tidal inundation. Sea level rise will also cause most sandy beaches to recede (where beaches will move further inland) and erode.

The Philippines is experiencing sea-level rise, which is threatening more than 40% of the population that live in coastal areas. The rising sea levels are causing increased flooding, erosion, and salinization of freshwater resources. These impacts have significant economic, social, and environmental consequences, including the displacement of people and destruction of coastal infrastructure. To address the impacts of climate change, the Philippine government has taken steps to mitigate greenhouse gas emissions and adapt to the changing climate. The country has committed to reducing its greenhouse gas emissions by 75% by 2030, which will require significant changes in the energy and transportation sectors. The government is also implementing measures to increase the resilience of the population to the impacts of climate change. These measures include the construction of flood control infrastructure, disaster risk reduction policies, and programs to promote sustainable agriculture.

In conclusion, climate change is a significant issue in the Philippines that is already causing significant economic, social, and environmental impacts. The country is particularly vulnerable to the impacts of climate change due to its location and its high population density. The government has taken steps to mitigate greenhouse gas emissions and adapt to the changing climate, but much more needs to be done to reduce the impacts of climate change on the country and its people. The Philippines must continue to prioritize climate action to build a more sustainable and resilient future.

== Environmentalism ==
=== Anti-nuclear movement ===
The anti-nuclear movement in the Philippines aimed to stop the construction of nuclear power facilities and terminate the presence of American military bases, which were believed to house nuclear weapons on Philippine soil. Anti-nuclear demonstrations were led by groups such as the Nuclear-Free Philippines Coalition (NFPC) and No Nukes Philippines. Coalitions argued that American bases in the Philippines perpetuated nuclear threats from other opponent nations of the United States, and that nuclear testing was transpiring in these bases. The nuclear threats and the bases also represented foreign intervention from the United States, which was a staunch issue among nationalists.

A focal point for protests in the late 1970s and 1980s was the proposed Bataan Nuclear Power Plant (BNPP), which was built by ousted President Ferdinand Marcos but never operated. The NFPC was formed by Senator Lorenzo M. Tañada, considered the father of the anti-nuclear movement in the Philippines, to stop the opening of the power plant, which it succeeded in pursuing. The Bataan nuclear project was criticized for being a potential threat to public health and for risks associated with the plant being located in an earthquake-prone location on the Bataan Peninsula. The power plant was also less than 180 kilometers away from Metro Manila, thus implicating multiple economic centers and regional sectors.

The anti-nuclear movement campaigned to remove foreign military bases in the Philippines. In 1991, the Philippine Senate voted to reject a new bases agreement treaty with the US, after which Tañada stood up from his wheelchair and was greeted with applause. The US left behind tons of toxic waste after its withdrawal and anti-nuclear campaigners provides assistance for the bases' cleanup. The former bases are now profitable tourist sites in the Philippines, such as the Subic Naval Bay in Subic and the Clark Air Base in Clark, Pampanga, which is a legacy of the anti-nuclear movement.

The movement continues to face challenges as attempts have been made to open the abandoned Bataan Nuclear Power Plant. In 2017 Korea Hydro & Nuclear Power Co. Ltd. (KEPCO) and Russia's Rosatom offered to negotiate to rehabilitate the plant. Opposition to the nuclear plant immediately responded and quickly raised concerns on long-term disposal of highly toxic waste, safety and health issues, reliance on imported uranium, the high cost of decommissioning, and other adverse effects.

=== Climate movement ===
Activists in the Philippines have organized activities to call for government action to address climate change. They have protested government policies that have allowed reclamation projects and mining activities and the killing of activists.

Activists have called for higher emission cuts in the Philippines and in developed countries.

==== Youth Strike for Climate ====
Philippine youth activists have participated in the global Youth Strike for Climate by organizing protest actions in different parts of the country. Youth activists have also protested the building of coal energy plants and their funding by multinational banks such as Standard Chartered.

=== Anti-mining movement ===
Environmental groups such as Alyansa Tigil Mina have called for a moratorium on mining projects. In 2025, these groups called for a review of mining contracts, including allegedly dubious permits and "midnight mining deals" approved in June 2016 and June 2022.

=== Threats to environmentalists ===
The Philippines is sometimes considered the most dangerous country for environmental activists. According to environmental watchdog Global Witness, at least 30 land and environmental defenders were killed in the Philippines in 2018, many of whom were in conflict with private business groups. Kalikasan People's Network for the Environment recorded 46 deaths in 2019. The group said activists have also been harassed, vilified, "red-tagged," and labeled as terrorists or "enemies of the state." Several environmentalists, such as Jonila Castro and Jhed Tamano, were abducted in 2022 to 2024 during the presidency of Bongbong Marcos.

Journalists reporting on the environment have also been threatened or killed. UNESCO director general Audrey Azoulay stated that the "continued targeting of journalists reporting on environmental issues represents a particularly concerning trend for freedom of expression."

Environmental groups have asked Congress to pass a Human Rights Defenders Bill to help protect activists and their families.

=== Climate change litigation ===
In May 2024, Nicol Melgar Marba, a Typhoon Odette survivor from Dinagat Islands, Philippines, and other victims of climate disasters from around the world filed before the Paris Criminal Court a criminal complaint against French oil company TotalEnergies, demanding compensation for "losses and damages for climate impacts".

=== Protected Areas and Conservation Disputes ===
In Rizal province, the Masungi Georeserve has been the subject of a dispute between conservation groups and the Department of Environment and Natural Resources (DENR) over the management of public land in the Upper Marikina River Basin. In March 2025, the DENR cancelled its 2002 supplemental agreement with Blue Star Construction Development Corporation, citing alleged irregularities including the absence of required bidding, lack of a presidential proclamation for the housing project, and failure to deliver the contracted housing units. The Masungi Georeserve Foundation disputed the cancellation, saying the move threatened ongoing conservation work in the area. In 2025, a BBC Verify investigation also reported that Masungi and its staff had been targeted by a network of fake Facebook accounts spreading misleading claims, which Meta later said had engaged in inauthentic activity.

== Government policy ==
=== Environmental protection ===
The Department of Environment and Natural Resources is responsible for creating, supporting, and enforcing policies on environmental protection by the Philippine government. The department is also tasked with ensuring sustainable management of the Philippines' natural resources. The Philippine Environmental Management Bureau (EMB) is responsible for environmental impact assessments, pollution prevention and control, as well as enforcing six main environmental laws in the Philippines. The Philippines has also signed into several international environmental treaties, with CITES protecting species from overexploitation due to international trade, and ratified the Paris Agreement.

=== Sustainable development ===
The Philippines formulated the Sustainable Development Strategy to tackle environmental issues and address the need to sustain development and growth. The Sustainable Development Strategy proposes policies for assimilating environmental considerations in administration, apposite pricing of natural resources, conservation of biodiversity, rehabilitation of ecosystems, control of population growth and human resources development, inducing growth in rural areas, promotion of environmental education, strengthening citizens' participation, and promoting small to medium-sized enterprises and sustainable agricultural and forestry practices. One of the initiatives signed in part of the strategy was the 1992 Earth Summit.

Upon signing the 1992 Earth Summit, the government of Philippines has been constantly looking into many different initiatives to improve the environmental aspects of the country.

=== Writ of Kalikasan ===
A Writ of Kalikasan is a legal remedy under Philippine law that provides protection of one's constitutional right to a healthy environment, as outlined in Section 16, Article II of the Philippine Constitution, which states that the "state shall protect and advance the right of the people to a balanced and healthful ecology in accord with the rhythm and harmony of nature." Kalikasan is a Filipino word for "nature".

The writ is comparable to the writ of amparo and the writ of habeas corpus. In contrast, this writ protects one's right for a healthy environment rather than constitutional rights. The Writ of Kalikasan originated in the Philippines, whereas the two aforementioned writs have roots in European and Latin American law.

=== Clean Air Act ===
Republic Act No. 8749, also known as the Philippine Clean Air Act of 1999, mandates the government to create and implement a national program for preventing and managing air pollution. The law also tasks the government to monitor air quality throughout the country. The Department of Environment and Natural Resources issued Administrative Order No. 81 in 2000 outlining its implementing rules and regulations for the Clean Air Act. It also issued in 2004 Administrative Order No. 2004-26 amending Rule XIX of DENR Administrative Order No. 2000-81.

== See also ==
- Ecoregions in the Philippines
- List of protected areas of the Philippines

Species:

- Wildlife of the Philippines
- List of threatened species of the Philippines
