= Anti-nuclear movement in the Philippines =

The anti-nuclear movement in the Philippines aimed to stop the construction of nuclear power facilities and terminate the presence of American military bases, which were believed to house nuclear weapons on Philippine soil. Anti-nuclear demonstrations were led by groups such as the Nuclear-Free Philippines Coalition (NFPC) and No Nukes Philippines. Coalitions argued that American bases in the Philippines perpetuated nuclear threats from other opponent nations of the United States, and that nuclear testing was transpiring in these bases. The nuclear threats and the bases also represented foreign intervention from the United States, which was a staunch issue among nationalists.

A focal point for protests in the late 1970s and 1980s was the proposed Bataan Nuclear Power Plant (BNPP), which was built by ousted President Ferdinand Marcos but never operated. The NFPC was formed by Senator Lorenzo M. Tañada, considered the father of the anti-nuclear movement in the Philippines, to stop the opening of the power plant, which it succeeded in pursuing. The Bataan nuclear project was criticized for being a potential threat to public health and for risks associated with the plant being located in an earthquake-prone location on the Bataan Peninsula. The power plant was also less than 180 kilometers away from Metro Manila, thus implicating multiple economic centers and regional sectors.

The anti-nuclear movement campaigned to remove foreign military bases in the Philippines. In 1991, the Philippine Senate voted to reject a new bases agreement treaty with the US, after which Tañada stood up from his wheelchair and was greeted with applause. The US left behind tons of toxic waste after its withdrawal and anti-nuclear campaigners provides assistance for the bases' cleanup. The former bases are now profitable tourist sites in the Philippines, such as the Subic Naval Bay in Subic and the Clark Air Base in Clark, Pampanga, which is a legacy of the anti-nuclear movement.

The movement continues to face challenges as attempts have been made to open the abandoned Bataan Nuclear Power Plant. In 2017 Korea Hydro & Nuclear Power Co. Ltd. (KEPCO) and Russia's Rosatom offered to negotiate to rehabilitate the plant. Opposition to the nuclear plant immediately responded and quickly raised concerns on long-term disposal of highly toxic waste, safety and health issues, reliance on imported uranium, the high cost of decommissioning, and other adverse effects.

== History ==
=== BNPP controversy ===
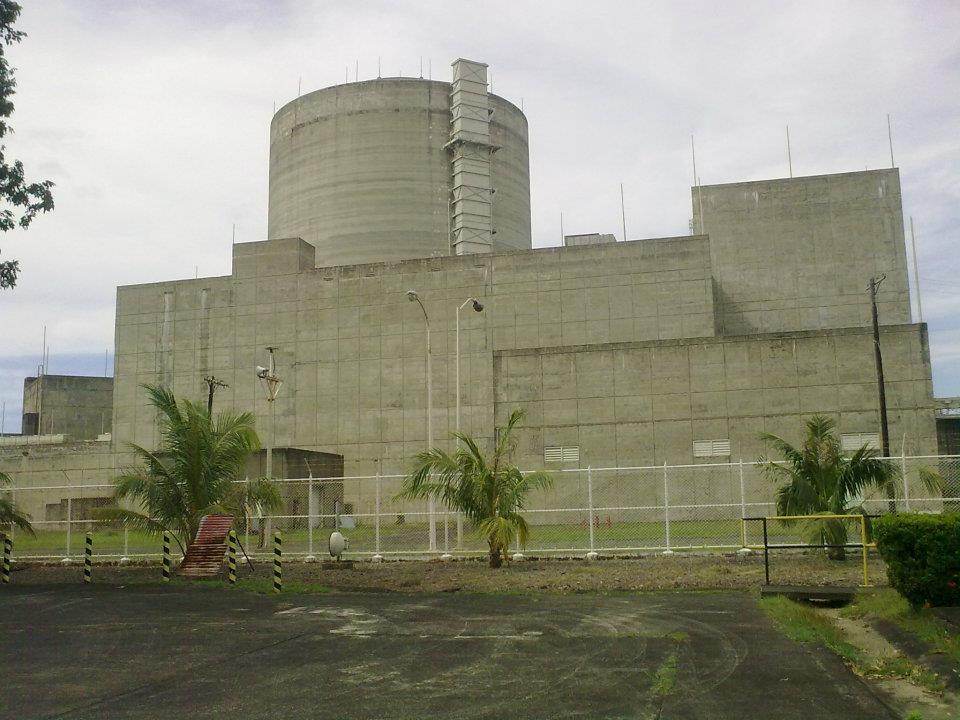
The abandoned Bataan Nuclear Power Plant photographed in 2011

The Bataan Nuclear Power Plant (BNPP) has been described in the media as a white elephant, an expensive lemon, and a monument to greed, corruption, and folly.

On January 26, 1981, Senator Tañada and a global coalition representing school teachers, farmers, students, health professionals, technocrats, political leaders, scientists and researchers, and human rights advocates formed the NFPC. The coalition was even supported by religious denominations, such as the United Church of Christ in the Philippines (UCCP), whose main building, the UCCP building in Quezon City, still serves as the coalition headquarters. The coalition featured a total number of 129 member organizations, which was the largest of its kind.

On October 26, 1983, 200 protestors led by the NFPC marched to the U.S. embassy from the University of the Philippines (UP). The protestors steadily gained in number to over 500. Then on June 13, 1984, a burning effigy of Uncle Sam, a symbol of U.S. oppression, was put on display in front of the embassy as increasing tensions manifested over the course of the year. This time, 2,000 protestors would show up and create headlines. A few months later in October 6, over 2,000 activists again arrived to protest, now in front of the main target site, the BNPP. This time protestors arrived with a burning sculpture of a skull. They explained their opposition to the plant, which could only output half its original proposed power supply, was charging the government more than double its original proposed price from Westinghouse Electric Corporation.

On June 18, 1985, a three-day protest called Welgang Bayan Laban sa Plantang Nuklear or in English, "The People's Strike" was held in Balanga, Bataan, the provincial capital. On the third day, on the 20th of June, 33,000 activists sponsored by 22 organizations were mobilized and caused a huge commotion, where members of the leftist New People's Army killed seven activists.

By April 1986, as a result of the protests, President Corazon Aquino, after ousting Marcos, called for the closure of the Bataan power plant. The power plant was a contentious issue among the government officials, but it was ultimately decided that the plant would simply have a delayed opening after news of the Chernobyl disaster in Ukraine occurred immediately after.

=== Contemporary movement ===
Eventually after the ousting of American military troops in 1992, the People's Task Force for Bases Clean-Up (PTFBC) was founded by the NFPC, which served as the secretariat of the task force from 1993 to 1996. This culminated in the First International Forum on Military Toxics and Bases Clean-up in November 1996. The NFPC continues to serve as the national center for addressing anti-nuclear, anti-imperialist, and foreign base conversion issues. They are currently hired by independent firms as well as government sectors like the Senate and Congress, as well as local city councils.

As early as 2009, KEPCO Philippines came under intense scrutiny when the firm announced its interest in strengthening the Philippine nuclear market. It conducted a study on the feasibility of opening the abandoned plant after 25 years, as the $2.2 billion (inflation-unadjusted) plant opened in 1984. The firm found that renovations and its grand opening would amount to $1 billion. The firm decided to suggest on financing the construction of a modern plant in its stead. The proposal has been criticized by legislators, though KEPCO has continued to research on Philippine nuclear testing sites for over 20 years. Scientists have also argued based on their research that the plant cannot last for the long-term period as it is situated near the large caldera Mount Natib.

== See also ==
- Green politics in the Philippines
- Environmental issues in the Philippines
