= Pollution of the Pasig River =

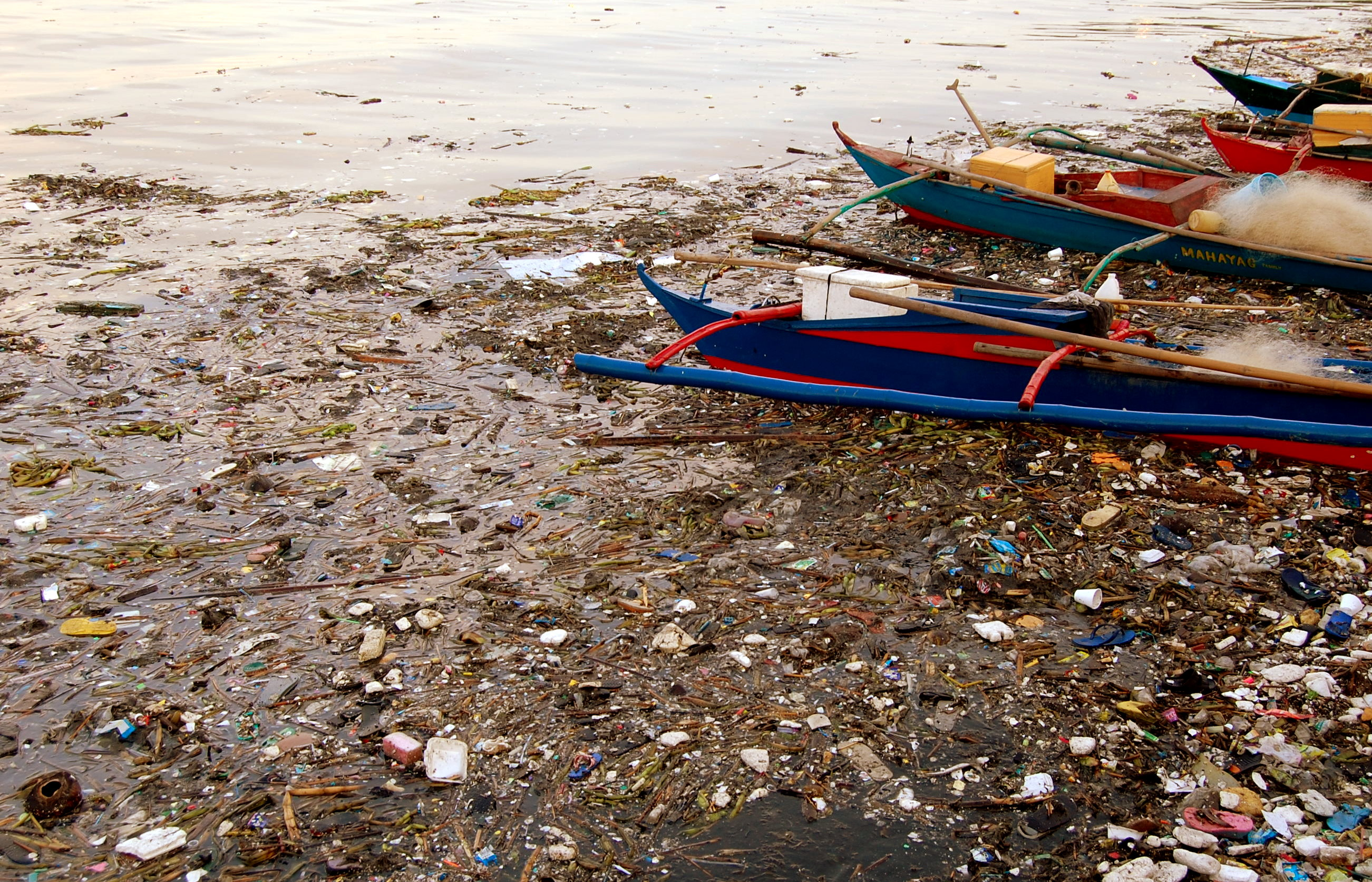
Pollution in Manila Bay in 2008. Manila Bay is the catchment area of the Pasig and Pampanga River Basins.

The Pasig River in the Philippines suffers from a high level of water pollution and efforts are being made to rehabilitate it.

After World War II, massive population growth, infrastructure construction, and the dispersal of economic activities to Manila's suburbs left the river neglected. The banks of the river attracted informal settlers and the remaining factories dumped their wastes into the river, making it effectively a huge sewer system. Industrialization had already polluted the river.

In the 1930s, observers noticed the increasing pollution of the river, as fish migration from Laguna de Bay diminished. People ceased using the river's water for laundering in the 1960s, and ferry transport declined. By the 1970s, the river started to emanate offensive smells as a result of waste from swine and poultry establishments in the area where protected Marikina watershed is located (Pinugay, Baras, Rizal) and in the 1980s, fishing in the river was prohibited. By 1990, the Pasig River was considered biologically dead.

It is estimated that about 60-65 percent of the pollution in the Pasig River comes from household waste disposed into the tributaries of the river. Increasing poverty in the rural areas in Philippines has driven migration to Metro Manila in search of better opportunities. This resulted in rapid urban growth, congestion and overcrowding of land and along the riverbanks, making the river and its tributaries a dumping ground for informal settlers living there. About 30–35 percent of the river pollution is generated from industries located close to the river (such as tanneries, textile mills, food processing plants, distilleries, and chemical and metal plants), some of which do not have water treatment facilities capable of removing heavy metal pollutants. The rest of the pollutants consist of solid waste dumped into the rivers. Metro Manila has been reported to produce as much as 7,000 metric tons (6,900 long tons; 7,700 short tons) of garbage per day. A study conducted by researchers from the Polytechnic University of the Philippines found that the river is also contaminated with microplastics. It is also the world's single largest source of marine plastic pollution, being responsible for 6.43% of global marine plastic pollution.

In 2017, a study on river plastic emissions into the world's oceans cited the Pasig River as the world's eighth most polluting river in terms of unwanted micro and surface concentrations of plastic waste entering the marine environment.

In 2021, a research by the American Association for the Advancement of Science on the world's rivers ranked the Pasig River as the largest contributor of plastic waste to the world's oceans, additionally claiming that 28% of the rivers causing plastic pollution globally are in the Philippines.

== Rehabilitation efforts ==
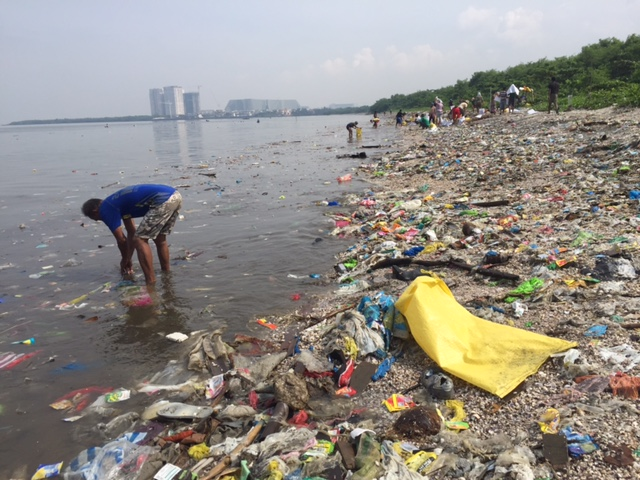
Residents of Freedom Island help Greenpeace and other NGO's in the coastal clean-up in 2017.

Efforts to revive the river began in December 1989 with the help of Danish authorities. The Pasig River Rehabilitation Program (PRRP) was established, with the Department of Environment and Natural Resources as the main agency with the coordination of the Danish International Development Assistance.

Gina Lopez launched in 2009 the Kapit-Bisig para sa Ilog Pasig project.

In 1999, President Joseph Estrada signed Executive Order No. 54 creating the Pasig River Rehabilitation Commission (PRRC) to replace the old PRRP with additional expanded powers such as managing of wastes and resettling of squatters. The administration of President Noynoy Aquino allocated PHP10 billion to clean the Pasig River.

In 2019, President Rodrigo Duterte abolished the PRRC, transferring its functions, including "all necessary and incidental powers," to the Manila Bay Task Force, the Department of Environment and Natural Resources, the Department of Human Settlements and Urban Development, the Metropolitan Manila Development Authority, and the Department of Public Works and Highways, two months after firing PRRC executive director Jose Antonio Goitia for alleged involvement in corrupt activities.

== See also ==
- Water supply and sanitation in the Philippines
- Environmental issues in the Philippines
