= Water supply and sanitation in the Philippines =

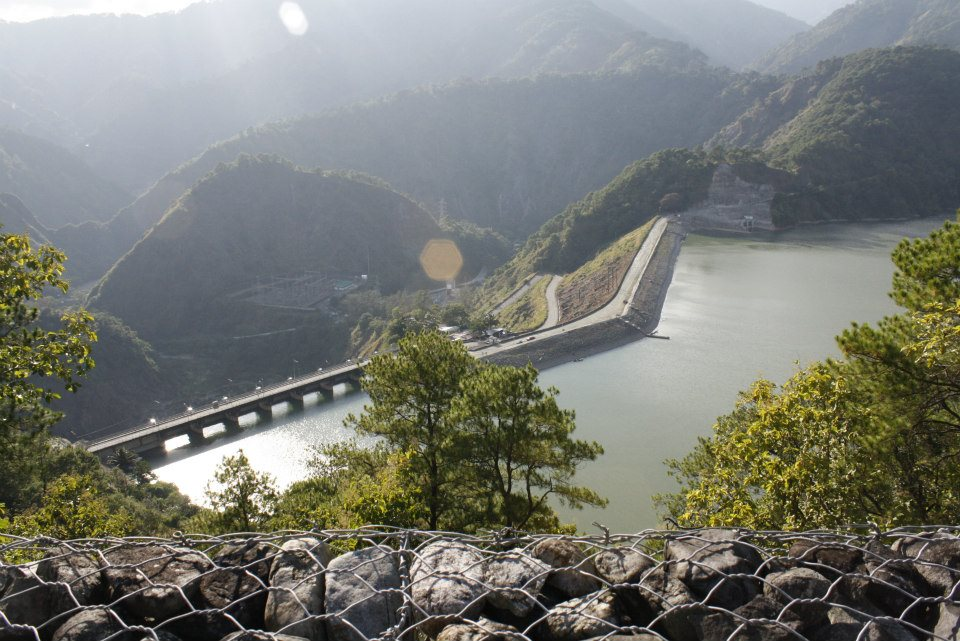
The Ambuklao Dam and Hydroelectric Power Plant in Bokod, Benguet, Philippines.

The Philippines' contemporary water supply system dates back to 1946, after the country declared independence. Government agencies, local institutions, non-government organizations, and other corporations are primarily in charge of the operation and administration of water supply and sanitation in the country.

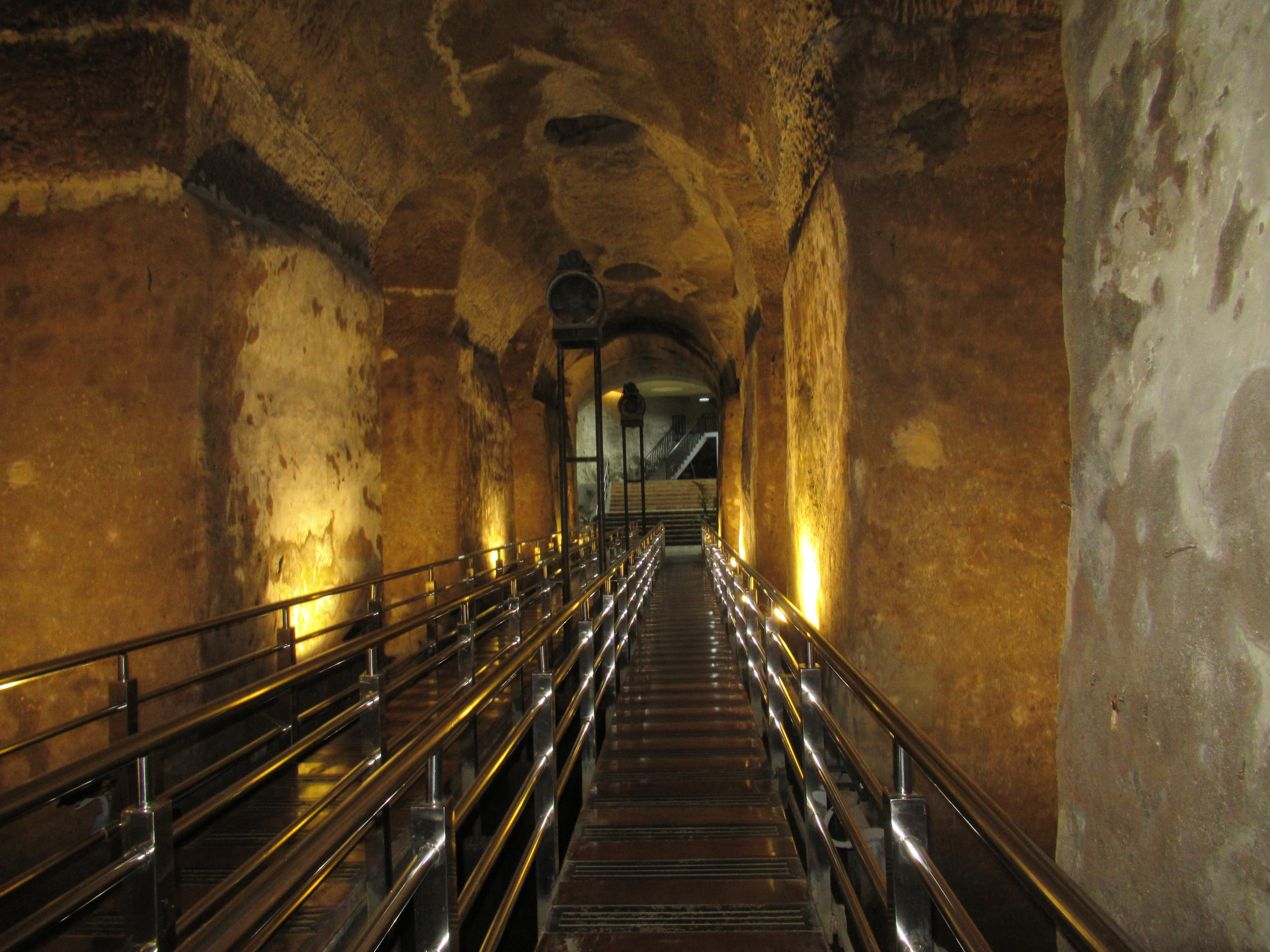
Historical El Deposito is an old underground water reservoir in the city of San Juan now converted into a museum

== Sources of water ==
The Philippines' main sources of water are rivers, lakes, river basins, and groundwater reservoirs. The longest and largest river, Cagayan River, discharges approximately 53,943 million cubic meters of water annually. Its groundwater reserves are 47,895 million cubic meters replenished by rainfall and seepage from rivers and lakes. The lakes are utilized mainly for fish cultivation. The four major groundwater reservoirs are in Cagayan, Central Luzon, Agusan, and Cotabato. There are 438 major dams and 423 smaller dams. Dams and reservoirs are mainly used for water storage, water supply, irrigation, regulation of flood, and hydropower.

The water in the metropolitan area of Manila is mostly supplied by the Angat Dam, Ipo Dam, and La Mesa Dam (also known as Angat-Ipo-La Mesa water system). Well-known and larger dams in the rural areas include Ambuklao Dam (developed for flood control, irrigation, and hydroelectric power source of Baguio and some regions in Luzon) and Magat Dam (irrigation and hydroelectric power source in Isabela). The Philippines is working hard to ensure everyone has fair access to clean water.

== Usage ==
28.52 billion m^{3} of water were withdrawn from various sources in the Philippines in 2000: 74% (21.10 billion m^{3}) was used for agricultural purposes, 9% (2.57 billion m^{3}) for industrial processes, and 17% (4.85 billion m^{3}) for domestic consumption.

=== Agricultural ===
Agricultural water management in the Philippines is primarily focused on irrigation. The country has 3.126 million hectares of irrigable land, 50% (1.567 million hectares) of which already has irrigation facilities. 50% of irrigated areas are developed and operated by the government through the National Irrigation System (NIS). 36% is developed by the government and operated by irrigators' associations through the Communal Irrigation System, while the remaining 14% is developed and operated by an individual or small groups of farmers through a Private Irrigation System (PIS).

=== Industrial ===
The uses of water for industrial purposes include the "utilization of water in factories, industrial plants and mines, and the use of water as an ingredient of a finished product." Water-intensive industries are involved in the manufacturing of food and dairy, pulp and chemical products, as well as textile materials. These industries are usually found in the National Capital Region, Calabarzon, and Region III. In a 1999 study by the United Nations Industrial Development Organization (UNIDO), the intensive use of water in the industry is critical in terms of the production of hazardous wastes. Thousands of tons of solvent wastes, heavy metals, lubricants, and intractable wastes are improperly disposed of annually in Metro Manila.

=== Domestic ===
According to a 1996 study by David and Inocencio, the medium of water provision is dependent on the income class of a certain household. Higher-income brackets usually rely on private waterworks as a source of water, while lower-income brackets usually consume less by depending on vended water (sold by those with access to private waterworks). Lower-income households pay much higher water prices than higher-income households due to lack of access to water service providers.

== Service provision ==
In 2000, the average water production was 175 liters per day per capita (L/d/c). According to the National Water Resources Board (NWRB), the average consumption of water was 118 L/d/c in 2004. The highest consumption was recorded in the East Zone of Metro Manila as 232 L/d/c.

=== Levels of water systems ===
According to a 2005 World Bank study, approximately 5,000 service providers exist in the Philippines. Most of them only provide water, since sanitation is expected to be a private responsibility. The water infrastructure provided is classified into three levels:

The handpump is an example of a Level I water system.

Levels of water systems in the Philippines
Level I	Stand-alone water points (e.g. handpumps, shallow wells, rainwater collectors) serving an average of 15 households within a 250-meter distance
Level II	Piped water with a communal water point (e.g. borewell, spring system) serving an average of 4–6 households within a 25-meter distance
Level III	Piped water supply with a private water point (e.g. house connection) based on daily water demand of more than 100 liters per person

=== Service providers ===
According to the Joint Monitoring Programme (JMP) for Water Supply and Sanitation of UNICEF and WHO, access to an improved water source increased from 85% in 1990 to 92% in 2010.

==== Local government units ====
Most households in the Philippines are provided water by their Local Government Units (LGUs), either directly through a city or municipal engineering department or through community-based organizations (CBOs). CBOs involved in water supply include 200 cooperatives, 3,100 Barangay Water and Sanitation Associations (BWSAs) and 500 Rural Water Supply Associations (RWSAs). CBOs usually operate Level I or Level II water supply systems with support from the national government or non-governmental organizations (NGOs). In many cases, the CBOs later convert Level I and II facilities into Level III supply systems. Typically, all LGU-operated arrangements do not recover their full costs and rely heavily on local government subsidies.

==== Water districts ====
Local Water Utilities Administration (LWUA) Seal

A water district is an entity that is legally and financially separate from the municipality. In urban areas outside of Metro Manila, water districts served around 15.3 million people from 861 municipalities in 2011. To form a water district, the local government needs confirmation from the Local Water Utilities Administration (LWUA), a specialized lending institution for provincial waterworks, from which it will receive technical assistance and financial support. The local government appoints the board members of the water districts. This system typically has better performance and higher cost recovery than water systems that are run directly by municipalities. The Philippine Association of Water Districts (PAWD), fosters the exchange of experiences between water districts and provides training to its members. In 2010, USAID and the ADB agreed to support PAWD in establishing a national Water Operators Partnerships (WOPs) program that promotes twinning partnerships among Water Districts.

==== Large-scale private operators ====
The zones of Metro Manila allocated to Maynilad (red) and Manila Water (blue).

In Metro Manila, water service has been carried out by two private concessionaires since 1997: The Manila Water Company in the East Zone, and Maynilad Water Services, Inc. in the West Zone. Although national government has supported private service providers since the 1990s, there are few arrangements outside of Metro Manila. Joint ventures exist in Tagbilaran City and in Subic Bay. These private water service providers provide Level III services together with water districts.

==== Small-scale independent providers ====
A significant share of the population in urban areas receive services from small-scale independent providers. It was estimated that before privatization in the late 1990s, 30% of the population of Metro Manila depended on them, majority buying water in bulk from water providers to sell it on to individual users. There are also some cases of cooperation by concessionaires and independent providers. In August 2007, 250 small-scale providers formed the National Water and Sanitation Association of the Philippines (NAWASA) as a gathering avenue for small-scale water service providers.

Benchmarking of water utility models
	Local Government Units (LGU)	Water Districts	Private Operators
Level of Service	Level I, II, and III	Level III	Level III
Availability (hours per day)	19	23	22
Consumption (liters per capita per day)	112	120	144
Staff (per 100 connections)	8	7	6
Tariff (Philippine peso per cubic meter)	7.60	17.82	15.37
Economic Regulation	National Water and Resources Board (NWRB)	National Water and Resources Board (NWRB)	According to contract
Financing	Public, NGOs, Tariffs	Local Waterworks and Utilities Administration (LWUA), Tariffs	Tariffs

== Access ==
=== Water supply ===
Access to water is universal, affordable, efficient and of high quality. The creation of financially sustainable water service providers ("water districts") in small and medium towns with the continuous long-term support of a national agency (the "Local Water Utilities Administration" LWUA); and the improvement of access, service quality and efficiency in Manila through two high-profile water concessions awarded in 1997. The challenges include limited access to sanitation services, high pollution of water resources, often poor drinking water quality and poor service quality, a fragmentation of executive functions at the national level among numerous agencies, and a fragmentation of service provision at the local level into many small service providers.

In 2015, 92% of the total population had access to "at least basic water", or 94% in urban areas and 90% in rural areas. In 2015, there were still 8 million people without access to "at least basic water". The term "at least basic water" is a new term since 2016, and is related to the previously used "improved water source".

In earlier years, according to the Joint Monitoring Program (JMP) report in March 2012, 43% of the Philippines had access to Level III private water service providers in 2010. Access to an improved water source increased from 84% in 1990 to 92% in 2012. However, there is a wide inconsistency between the access to water of urban areas (61%) and rural areas (25%). Although overall spending remained low, the national government has begun increasing investments in sectors outside Metro Manila. In 2015, it was reported by the Joint Monitoring Programme for Water Supply and Sanitation that 74% of the population had access to improved sanitation, and that "good progress" had been made between 1990 and 2015.

=== Sewage and Sanitation ===
In 2015, 74% of the total population had access to "improved" sanitation, or 78% in urban areas and 71% in rural areas. In 2015, there were still 27 million without access to "improved" sanitation.

In 2005, only 5% of the total population was connected to a sewer network. The vast majority used flush toilets connected to septic tanks. Since sludge treatment and disposal facilities were rare, most effluents were discharged without treatment. Within the entire country, septic tanks are the most common method of sewage treatment. In Metro Manila alone, about 75 local companies provide tank-desludging services.

The first Philippine constructed wetland, serving about 700 households, was completed in 2006 in a peri-urban area of Bayawan, which has been used to resettle families that lived along the coast in informal settlements and had no access to safe water supply and sanitation facilities. In March 2008, Manila Water announced that a wastewater treatment plant was to be constructed in Taguig.

== Economic Aspects ==
=== Water bill information ===
==== Current charges before tax ====
- Basic charge: This covers the cost of operating, maintaining, improving and expanding the distribution network, as well as the facilities responsible for bringing potable water to the end-user. The Basic Charge is based on the latest approved tariff schedule.
- Foreign currency differential adjustment (FCDA): This is a percentage of the basic charge which accounts for fluctuations of the Philippine Peso against other countries' currencies subject to periodic review and adjustment. The FCDA for the second quarter of 2015 is 0.18% of the Basic Charge. In 2018, the MWSS removed the FCDA in water bills of customers in Metro Manila when the Revised Concession Agreements (RCA) of Manila's water service providers took into effect.
- Environmental charge: This is for the mitigation of environmental impacts in the course of water and wastewater operation. It is 20% of the Basic Charge applicable to all customers.
- Sewer charge: 0% of the Basic Charge is added for Residential and Semi-Business customers with a sewer line connection. 20% of Basic Charge, on the other hand, is charged for Commercial and Industrial customers.
- Maintenance service charge: This covers the maintenance of the water meter. The charge changes depending on the size of the water meter. For customers of Manila Water in Metro Manila, the minimum charge is 1.50 Philippine pesos for a 13mm-sized meter.

==== Value added tax ====
The value-added tax (VAT) is charged by the government and accounts for 12% of the sum of the items included in current charges before tax.

==== Other charges ====
These are special miscellaneous charges such as connection fees, unscheduled desludging of septic tank service fees, etc.

==== Previous unpaid amount ====
This pertains to charges billed prior to the billing period. This should be settled immediately together with the current charges to avoid the disconnection of water service.

=== Tariffs ===
The fragmented sector led to different tariff structures and levels according to the respective management model. The connection fees, which are charged in most of the cases, often impede new connections for poverty-stricken areas.

LGU-operated systems In LGUs, tariff levels, and structures vary widely. Since most connections are not metered, it is difficult to charge tariffs depending on consumption. Where LGUs provide Level I or II services, they usually charge no or very low tariffs, although connection fees are common. The costs of providing the service are usually met by local governments. The NWRB in its benchmarking project had about half of the average tariff of private operators and water districts. The cost of tariff in LGU-operated systems is, on average, lower than other management models. In order to introduce cost recovery tariffs and effective regulation, the NWRB issued a primer on tariff setting and regulation in March 2005. The document provides the basic guidelines of the tariff setting. The manual helps to determine future revenue requirements and to set annual base tariffs based on estimated consumption levels. The process of tariff approval as well as the guidelines to prepare the required annual report are described in detail. Furthermore, the document gives advice on tariff structures and water rate adjustments.

Water districts. In water districts, tariffs increased notably since 1996. The tariff structure is similar to the model used in Metro Manila, with an average tariff for the first 10m^{3} and increasing tariffs for additional consumption. At the end of 2006, the national average tariff for 30 m^{3} was US$0.36 per m^{3}, which is more than double of 1996. The NWRB found an average tariff of US$0.41 within a sample of 18 water districts in 2004, which is the highest average tariff of all management models. The average connection fee was US$55, somewhat lower than among private operators.

Metro Manila. In the capital region, an initial tariff is to be paid for the first 10 m^{3} consumed, with increasing blocks for additional consumption. Furthermore, consumers connected to sewerage pay an additional charge of 50% and all users must pay a 10% environmental surcharge. For new consumers, a connection fee is charged, which was US$134 in April 2007 in the East Zone For new consumers, a connection fee is charged, which was US$134 in April 2007 in the East Zone According to the MWSS Regulatory Office, just before privatization, the average tariff per m^{3} in Metro Manila was US$0.26. After the concession contracts came into force in 1997, tariffs dropped to US$0.05 (East Zone) and US$0.12 (West Zone). In 2006, the average tariff rose to US$0.31 in the East Zone and US$0.43 in the West Zone (all figures converted into real 2006 prices). While the tariff was highest among private operators, the connection fee was higher within water districts.

Others. Users who rely on other sources such as private small-scale operators mostly pay more for water. In the capital region, it is a common practice to buy water from MWSS and resell. In this case, small-scale operators pay a higher tariff than the residential one and pass the higher cost on to the end-user.

=== Cost-recovery ===
The operation ratio (O) of a certain water service provider reflects its cost-recovery situation. It is computed by the following formula:

$O=C/R$

where O is the operation cost, C is the total annual cost, and R is the annual revenue. An operation ratio under 1 means that revenues cover the costs of operation and maintenance. In a study last 2004, only 5 out of 45 had an operating ratio of more than 1, reflecting a poor operation ratio among the majority of the participating utilities. All the loss-making providers were operated directly by LGUs and were mostly characterized by a high share of non-revenue water, poor service continuity, low tariffs, and low coverage within their respective service areas. The five best-performing service providers consisted of four water districts and one private operator.

=== Investment ===
According to the World Bank, investment in water supply and sanitation from 1983 to 2003 has been far below the required levels to maintain assets, to expand access and to improve service quality. Total investment has fluctuated at around ₱3–4 billion a year, while the cost of implementing the Clean Water Act of 2004 has been estimated at up to P35 billion a year.

== Political aspects ==
=== History ===
From the Philippines' independence in 1946 until 1955, most water supply systems were operated by local authorities. From 1955 to 1971, control of urban water supply was passed to the national government. In order to improve service delivery, the sector has been repeatedly subjected to extensive reforms which created numerous institutions and responsibilities. However, comprehensive water resources management was only introduced in 2004.

==== Pre-Marcos Administration ====
The Manila Waterworks Authority, founded in 1878, became part of the National Waterworks and Sewerage Authority (NAWASA) when it was founded in 1955.

==== Marcos Administration (1965–1986) ====
- 1971. NAWASA was transformed into the Metropolitan Waterworks and Sewerage System (MWSS) under the government of Ferdinand Marcos. MWSS was made responsible for service provision in Metro Manila, whereas other municipal and provincial water and sewerage systems in about 1,500 cities and towns were transferred back to local governments.
- 1973. A new management model for urban water supply was introduced: LGUs were encouraged to form utilities called Water Districts which would operate with a certain degree of autonomy from LGUs. They would receive technical assistance and financial support from the newly created Local Water Utilities Administration (LWUA).
- 1976. The National Water Resources Board (NWRB) was created through the National Water Code of the Philippines to coordinate policies concerning water resources.
- 1980. The Rural Waterworks Development Corporation (RWDC) was founded. It is responsible for water supply in areas where neither MWSS nor LWUA carries out the service or assists the LGUs, respectively. The RWDC was expected to create rural water supply associations in order to construct, operate, and maintain their own water supply systems in communities with fewer than 20,000 inhabitants. It was also the beginning of the United Nations' International Drinking Water Supply and Sanitation Decade (1980–1989). The Integrated Water Supply Program (1980–2000) was initiated by the national government. Its main objective was to increase water coverage to 70% of the Filipino population by 1987 and 90% by 1992. Consequently, the development of the sector was supported with great effort: Between 1978 and 1990, more than US$120 million was invested in 11 rural water supply projects. Nevertheless, toward the end of the decade, only 4,400 functioning rural water systems, about 5% of the 96,200 potential systems, existed in the country. Many of the recently constructed systems failed shortly after completion, partly due to poor construction and service. The Asian Development Bank (ADB) found that insufficient community participation may have led to inadequate operation and maintenance.

==== Aquino Administration (1986-1992) ====
- 1987. The Local Water Utilities Administration took over the work of Rural Waterworks Development Corporation (RWDS) which had been created only seven years earlier. The Rural Water Supply and Sanitation Master Plan of 1988 provided for the installation of 81,900 rural water supply systems by 1991. The DPWH was expected to construct and rehabilitate Level I water wells, rainwater collectors, and springs. Every barangay should receive at least one additional potable water source. In addition, the Department of Local Government and Community Development (DLGCD) was given the task of training local water user associations in the operation and maintenance of water facilities.
- 1991. Under the Local Government Code, certain infrastructure functions were devolved to LGUs. Barangays, municipalities, provinces, and cities were authorized to finance, operate, and maintain their own water supply systems.
- 1992. According to the Medium-Term Philippine Development Plan of 1983–1998, 80% of the rural population was provided with Level I water supply services at the end of Aquino's term of office in 1992. 61% had direct service connections in Metro Manila and 47% in other urban areas of the country were covered by Level II and III water systems.

==== Ramos Administration (1992-1998) ====
The planning, preparation, and implementation of the privatization of the Metropolitan Waterworks and Sewerage System (MWSS) occurred under the Ramos administration.

- 1995. The Water Crisis Act was passed, providing the legal framework for the privatization of MWSS. Private participation was implemented through a concession contract in which the concessionaires were assigned the task of operating and managing the facilities while MWSS preserved the ownership of the infrastructure. In order to facilitate benchmark comparisons, the service area of Metro Manila was divided into two zones.
- 1996. The plan to privatize Metropolitan Waterworks and Sewerage System (MWSS) emerged from the inability of the public utility to expand coverage to the growing population. By 1996, MWSS only provided the water supply for an average of 16 hours each day to two-thirds of its coverage population. According to the ADB, the share of non-revenue water (NRW), water which is not billed (e.g., due to leakage and illegal connections), was over 60% --- an extremely high percentage compared to other developing countries.
- 1997. The Maynilad Water Services, Inc. was awarded the concession contract for the West Zone, while the Manila Water Company, Inc. was awarded the East Zone of Metro Manila. The concession contracts, which are expected to last for 25 years, included targets concerning coverage, service quality, and economic efficiency. The objective was to increase water coverage in Metro Manila to 96% by 2006. The companies were expected to be regulated by the newly created MWSS Regulatory Office, financed by the concessionaires. After the concession came into force, public opposition soon emerged due to repeated tariff increases. However, it is worth mentioning that tariffs decreased after privatization in 1997, and did not reach the pre-privatization level until 2001 or 2002. Private concessionaires suffered from a severe drought and the 1997 Asian financial crisis.

==== Estrada Administration (1998–2001) ====
According to the Medium-Term Philippine Development Plan (MTPDP) of 1998 up to 2004, the Estrada administration's main objectives concerning water were to (i) create an independent regulatory agency, (ii) develop a pricing mechanism that considers cost recovery, (iii) strengthen the implementation of watershed rules, and (iv) encourage private participation in water resources administration.

==== Arroyo Administration (2001-2010) ====
Because of the rapid currency devaluation, MWSS' dollar-denominated debt service doubled. Consequently, tariffs continued to rise, and targets concerning coverage and NRW were adjusted downward with the agreement of the regulatory agency. Maynilad went bankrupt in 2003 and was turned over to MWSS in 2005. On the other hand, Manila Water had begun to make profits by 1999 and performed well financially and in reducing NRW.

- 2001-2004. Arroyo continued to support private participation schemes and began to pursue Economies of scale in the sector. Furthermore, her MTPDP for this period called for the creation of a single regulatory agency for all water supply and sanitation systems. After this attempt failed, Economic regulation for LGUs and water districts were assigned to NWRB.
- 2004. The Philippines Clear Water Act was passed to improve water quality and prevent pollution through comprehensive and integrated water management. The act was the first attempt of the Philippine government in consolidating different laws concerning water resources management as well as water supply and sanitation. The main objective of the act was to improve sanitation and wastewater treatment in the country.
- 2006. In December, an 84%-stake in Maynilad was competitively awarded by MWSS to an all-Filipino partnership with a construction company DM Consunji Holdings, Inc. (DMCI) and a telecommunications/real estate company Metro Pacific Investments Corporation (MPIC) for a sales price of US$503.9 million. The concession was hailed by the financial industry, receiving AsiaMoney's Country Deal of the Year 2007 and CFO Asia's one of 10 best deals in Asia.
- 2008. On August 27, Prospero Pichay was appointed chairman of the board of the Local Waterworks and Utilities Administration (LWUA), replacing acting chair Proceso Domingo. At the same time its domestic and foreign borrowing authority was proposed to be extended to $900 million, upon the approval of Department of Finance and the Central Bank, the Bangko Sentral ng Pilipinas.

==== Aquino Administration (2010–2016) ====
- 2013. The Bottom-Up Budgeting (BUB) Project was implemented by the administration, in its National Budget, to fund projects that would help the country attain its Millennium Development Goals of inclusive growth and poverty reduction. In promoting good governance in the local level by having local governments listen to their constituents in terms of budgeting processes, the National Budget was guided to respond to the urgent needs of the people as identified at the grassroots level.
- 2014. Another program of the administration, through the Department of the Interior and Local Government, is the Sagana at Ligtas na Tubig Para sa Lahat (SALINTUBIG) program that aims to provide clean and potable water supply to almost 455 waterless municipalities in the Philippines. As of 2014, 253 projects and 118 more are ongoing all over the country.
- 2015. The BUB project proved to be a success as the Department of the Interior and Local Government, spearheaded by Secretary Mar Roxas, was able to build a potable water system supporting 385 households in Mati City, Davao Oriental. At the same time, a health station was constructed that is posed to benefit 2,375 households through the BUB project by the Department of Health. With a budget of P410 Million, for BUB projects in Davao Oriental, government projects are geared towards a safer and healthier future for all.

=== Policy ===
General policies concerning the water and sanitation sector are formulated by the National Economic and Development Authority (NEDA) in its MTPDP. Since the 1990s, private sector participation and decentralization are the main objectives of water policies. The MTPDP of 2004 up to 2010 aimed at extending the coverage of potable water to 92%–96% by 2010 through public and private investments, with priority given to 400 barangays with poor water supply coverage.

The Department of Public Works and Highways (DPWH) provides technical assistance in rural water supply systems. National standards for drinking water quality, as well as standards concerning sanitation and sewerage collection, are set by the Department of Health. The Philippine Department of Environment and Natural Resources (DENR) is the lead ministry for implementing water sector legislation, whereas the Department of Finance takes the lead in financing water policies at the national level. The National Water Resources Board (NWRB) under the DENR is responsible for water resources management.

The responsibilities are defined by the 1976 National Water Code and the 2004 Clean Water Act, which consolidated laws on water supply and sanitation and water resources management.

==== 1976 National Water Code (PD 1067) ====
Regarded as Presidential Decree No. 1067, dated December 31, 1976, the 1976 National Water Code was an effort of then-President Ferdinand E. Marcos that aimed to strengthen water legislations in the face of the increasing scarcity of water and its changing water patterns. The Water Code was an intended solution to revise and consolidate regulations made on the ownership, appropriation, utilization, exploitation, development, conservation, and protection of water resources in the country. Founded on the principle that "All waters belong to the State," the National Water Resources Council was then created and tasked to control and regulate the use and development of water resources on behalf of the government.

Regulations were made through the acquisition of water permits, given to persons not limited to government-owned and controlled corporations, for water appropriation and usage. Specifications were included on the maximum amount of water diverted or withdrawn, the maximum rate of diversion or withdrawal, and the times during the year when water may be diverted or withdrawn. Instances may also arise where water permits are revoked on cases of non-use, violation of the conditions imposed by the council, unauthorized sale of water, pollution, and public acts detrimental to public health and safety.

In declared flood control areas, rules and regulations are administered to prohibit and control activities that may damage and cause deterioration of the lakes and dikes, changes in the natural flow of the river, and increases in flood losses or intensified floods. Watersheds, or areas of land adjacent to any surface water or overlying any groundwater, are to be declared as protected areas of the Department of Environment and Natural Resources. These efforts ensure the quality of water defined by a standard set by the National Pollution Council Commission according to the different uses of water. Except for those functions under the Code that may fall under specific government agencies, the council is given the power to make all necessary decisions and determinations provided for in the said Code. The Council may provide accompanying penalties consisting of fines not exceeding one thousand pesos (P1,000.00) and/or the suspensions or revocation of water permits or any rights given to use water as well as enforce its decisions with the assistance of local and national police agencies.

==== Philippine Clean Water Act of 2004 (RA 9275) ====
Republic Act 9275 provides for a comprehensive water quality management policy amidst economic growth. The policy provides for the consistent protection, preservation, and revival of the quality of Philippine waters with frameworks patterned through the pursuit of sustainable development. Importantly provided for by this act are Water Quality Management Systems and Institutional Mechanisms.

Water Quality Management Systems involve area designations by the Department of Environment and Natural Resources (DENR), national sewerage and septage management programs, and allocation of special funds to support and maintain water quality. Areas that have similar hydrogeological conditions, which affect the physicochemical, biological, and bacteriological reactions and diffusions of pollutants in the water bodies, are declared as Water Quality Management Areas. The management area is governed by a DENR representative as chair and board members composed of representatives from local government units (LGUs), relevant national government agencies, registered non-governmental organizations, water utility sectors, and the business sector. On the other hand, water bodies with specific pollutants that have exceeded the guidelines for water quality are identified as Non-attainment Areas. LGUs are tasked to prepare and implement contingency plans, such as relocations, for the protection of the health and welfare of the residents, while the government improves the affected quality of water within the potentially affected areas.

Funds administered by the DENR, and other concerned agencies, are on special accounts in the National Treasury to be utilized in financing containment and clean-up operations in water pollution cases; restorations of ecosystems and rehabilitation of affected areas; research, enforcement and monitoring activities; technical assistance to implementing agencies; grants as rewards and incentives; and other disbursements made solely for the prevention, control of water pollution and administration of the management areas in the amounts authorized by the department.

Wastewater charges are also established to provide a strong economic inducement for polluters to modify their production or management processes or to invest in pollution control technology in order to reduce the number of water pollutants generated in their discharge of wastewater into water bodies. Owners, or operators of facilities, that discharge regulated waste are then required to secure discharge permits.

Institutional Mechanisms emphasized the collaborative efforts made in the hopes of having cleaner and better quality water through the Lead Agency (DENR); the Roles of Local Government Units in sharing the responsibility of maintaining and improving water quality within their territorial jurisdictions; the Business and Industry Role in formulating incentives for the adoption of innovative equipment and processes that preserve and protect water bodies; and Linkage Mechanisms through partnerships with government agencies and departments such as the Philippine Coast Guard, public works, Department of Agriculture (DA), DOH, Department of Science and Technology (DOST), Department of Education (DepEd), Commission on Higher Education (CHED) and Department of the Interior and the Local Government (DILG).

=== Government agencies and institutions ===
==== Local Water Utilities Administration (LWUA) ====
The Local Water Utilities Administration, sometimes known as the Local Waterworks and Utilities Administration, is a government-owned and controlled corporation and specialized lending institution that promotes and manages the development of provincial water management facilities. It is also entrusted with setting water quality and service standards for water districts and provides technical and institutional development assistance.

Presidential Decree 198, also known as the Provincial Water Utilities Act of 1973, authorized the formation of autonomous water districts on a local option basis to develop local water supply systems and created the LWUA as a national-level agency addressing the needs of water districts. According to its website, the LWUA set up 584 water districts with a combined service area of 691 cities and towns outside Metro Manila and helped build 1,431 water supply projects. It also extended loans to water districts totaling 17 billion pesos, of which 11 million pesos was availed leading to 12 million Filipinos having improved water services.

==== National Water Resources Board (NWRB) ====
The National Water Resources Board is the forefront government agency that handles the Philippines' water sectors' policies, regulations, and quasi-judicial functions. It acts accordingly with the principles of the Integrated Water Resource Management (IWRM) as it ensures the efficiency, conservation, utilization, development, and protection of the state's water supply.

==== Rural Waterworks Development Corporation (RWDC) ====
Executive Order No. 577 which was passed last January 12, 1980, aims to provide full coverage of water supply services in the country. In line with this, Rural Waterworks Development Corporation was established to bring and administer water supply in areas with less than 20,000 as population. RWDC works together with LWUA in determining areas under their jurisdiction. The RWDC was abolished in 1987 through Executive Order 124-A.

==== Department of the Interior and Local Government ====
Concerning local government-managed systems, the Department of the Interior and Local Government (DILG) define and enforces quality and performance standards. However, in both cases, local governments retain the responsibilities for planning, financing, and regulating water supply.

==== Philippine Center for Water and Sanitation ====
The Philippine Center for Water and Sanitation (PCWS) provides technical assistance to local governments, communities, and non-profits on low-cost water supply and sanitation options. It also engages in action research with households. It leads the Philippines water sanitation and health (WASH) coalition of non-profit organizations and local governments. It was created in 1990 under the name of International Training Network (ITN) and adopted its current name in 1998.

==== Philippine Society of Sanitary Engineers, Inc. ====
The Philippine Society of Sanitary Engineers, Inc. (PSSE) is the only professional organization of Sanitary Engineers in the Philippines accredited by the Professional Regulation Commission by virtue of PRC Board Resolution No. 2009-497 & Certificate of Accreditation No. 26. The PSSE is also the only PRC accredited Continuing Professional Education Provider for Sanitary Engineers.

== Financing and external cooperation ==
Outside the privatized services in Metro Manila, one source of finance for water supply is government grants channeled through the Local Water Utilities Administration (LWUA) and the Municipal Development Funds Office (MDFO). But these are far from sufficient to meet investment needs, which is why loan financing is necessary. Some LGUs obtain loans from public banks such as the Development Bank of the Philippines (DBP) and the Land Bank of the Philippines (LBP), and also from corporations in other countries, such as the World Bank, and JICA from Japan (see below).

External development agencies that work on water supply and sanitation in the Philippines include the ADB, GTZ, JICA, USAID, and the World Bank.

=== Asian Development Bank ===
The Asian Development Bank (ADB) has assisted the government in increasing sanitized water supply to different sectors in the Philippines. Through the MWSS New Water Source Development Project, approved in 2003 and ended in October 2008, ADB has contributed a total of US$3.26 million, whereas MWSS provided US$1.71 million. The joint-project sought to develop up to 3 water source projects for Metro Manila and to improve the financial management as well as the accounting and fiscal control systems of MWSS. In 2008, studies for two water source projects were completed emphasizing environmental and social impacts amidst water quality improvements.

The following report shows information about past performances:

ADB Assistance to Water Supply and Sanitation Sector in the Philippines
Number		Title	Type	Approval Date	Amount ($ millions)	EA
A Loans
1	190	Manila Water Supply		August 28, 1974	51.30	MWSS
2	251	Provincial Cities Water Supply		December 16, 1975	16.80	LWUA
3	351	Second Manila Water Supply		September 7, 1978	49.00	MWSS
4	457	Manila Sewerage		June 24, 1980	42.80	MWSS
5	545	Water Supply Sector		November 25, 1981	46.00	LWUA
6	645	Manila Water Supply Rehabilitation		October 23, 1983	39.30	MWSS
7	812	Island Provinces Rural Areas Water Supply Sector		December 4, 1986	24.00	DPWH
8	947	Second Manila Water Supply Rehabilitation		January 24, 1989	26.40	MWSS
9	986	Angat Water Supply Organization		November 14, 1989	130.00	MWSS
10	1052	Second Island Provinces Rural Water Supply		November 20, 1990	24.00	DPWH

^{Table only shows a part of the report. For more information, click the link cited above.}

In 2013, ADB made preparations of loans for financing (i) the Water District Development Sector Project, (ii) the Urban Water and Sanitation Sector Project, (iii) the Angat Water Transmission Improvement Project, and (iv) future technical assistance and other lending activities to be discussed with the specific government agencies involved.

ADB was also able to release a report on the assessments of current conditions and constraints to developing water supply and sanitation in the country, strategies to be implemented to counter and solve these constraints, and road maps and plans on a sustainable sanitation reality for all. The Philippine Sustainable Sanitation Roadmap and Plan (PSSR), included in the report, served as a guide for water sanitation efforts as it presented the vision, goals, outcomes, outputs, activities, and inputs needed to achieve an improved water quality nationwide. Approved by the subcommittee on Water Resources in 2010, the Department of Health (DOH) has agreed to spearhead the agenda by preparing a national sustainable sanitation plan based on the PSSR. The DILG has also aligned its water and sanitation strategy with the requirements of the PSSR.

=== German Corporation for International Cooperation ===
The German Corporation for International Cooperation (GTZ, now GIZ) supported the sector through the rural water supply and sanitation program, designed to improve the living conditions of the poor in selected rural areas of the country. The program sought to overcome the institutional confusion and to strengthen governmental organizations at the national, provincial, and municipal levels. Its main partner was the Department of the Interior and Local Government (DILG). In addition, the decentralization plan of the National Water Resources Board was supported. The program, which ran from 2006 to 2009, helped to introduce low-cost options for sanitation, such as urine-diverting dry toilets, and the first Philippine constructed wetland, treating wastewater from about 700 households in Bayawan.

=== World Bank ===
The World Bank supports the Philippine water supply and sanitation sector through various projects, often in collaboration with the government and the Land Bank of the Philippines.

==== Manila Third Sewerage Project ====
In 2007, the World Bank approved an investment loan of US$5 million. The project aimed to (i) assist the Philippine government in reforming institutions in order to attract private investment in the wastewater sector, (ii) improve the coordination of institutions responsible for preventing water pollution, and (iii) promote innovative wastewater treatment techniques. The project, which ran from 2007 to 2012, provided technical assistance as well as support for institutional coordination and private sector involvement.

The project followed the Manila Second Sewerage Project, which was carried out from 1996 to 2005. After the privatization of MWSS, it was restructured in order to adapt it to the new institutional framework. The objectives were to (i) reduce the pollution of waterways in Metro Manila and its surrounding bays, (ii) reduce the health risks caused by human exposure to sewage in Metro Manila, and (iii) establish a gradual low-cost improvement of sewerage services in Metro Manila. From 1997 to 2005, the number of people with sewer connections increased from 721,000 to 1,101,000 and the population with regularly desludging septic tanks rose from only 1,600 to 288,000. The total cost of the project was US$48.06 million.

==== Urban Water and Sanitation Project APL2 ====
This project aimed to reach approximately 40 LGU-operated water systems, which were given technical assistance and financial support. The four components of the project were: to (i) finance civil works, equipment, and supervision for improved water supply systems in LGUs, including private sector participation where feasible, (ii) finance improved sanitation infrastructure, (iii) provide investment and assistance in micro-drainage infrastructure, and (iv) provide funds for the hiring of a construction supervision consultant and specialized consultants. The World Bank decided to contribute through a US$30 million loan to the project, while the remaining US$5.2 million are financed by local institutions. The project began in 2001 and ended in 2008.

The World Bank supports private sector participation through Design-Build-Lease contracts and Long-Term Operation and Maintenance contracts between LGUs and private operators. Therefore, the Development Bank of the Philippines (DBP) and the Land Bank of the Philippines (LBP) channel financing from the World Bank to LGUs, which engage private operators. Under the Design-Build-Lease contracts, valid for 15 years and renewable for an additional 15 years, a local private operator prepares, builds, and operates a new water supply system. A World Bank loan channeled through the DBP finances 90% of the construction cost, and the remainder is contributed through the LGU. The water tariff must cover expenses for operation and maintenance, as well as a lease fee and a return for the private operator.

Long-Term Operation and Maintenance contracts are used in LGUs which recruit a private company to construct a new water supply system and later engage water associations or user cooperatives to operate the system under the contracts, which are awarded for 15 years with the possibility of renewal for another 15 years. Similar to the Design-Build-Operate contracts, 90% of the construction cost of the water system is financed with a World Bank loan channeled through the LBP. The water user groups are required to work under commercial rules. They have full administrative, accounting and financial autonomy.

==== Metro Manila Wastewater Management Project (MWMP) ====
Last 2012, the World Bank was able to approve a budget of $275 million for a project aimed at improving wastewater collection and treatment practices in several catchment areas of Metro Manila as well as Manila Bay's water quality. Also called the Metro Manila Wastewater Management Program (MWMP), this project supports investments from the Manila Water Company, Inc. (MWCI) and Maynilad Water Services, Inc. in increasing collection and wastewater treatment primarily from households and establishments in the area. The project is divided into 2 components as MWCI takes charge of the east zone and Maynilad the west zone, of the metropolitan.

With a budget of $193.4 million, investments by Manila Water include: (i) a sewage treatment plant, and the necessary sewage lines, covering North and South Pasig, (ii) the carrying out of other wastewater management investment sub-projects agreed upon by the government, Land Bank of the Philippines, World Bank and MWCI.

With a budget of $178.3 million, investments by Maynilad include: (i) sewage treatment plants and associated wastewater conveyance systems in Quezon City, Pasay, Alabang, Muntinlupa, Valenzuela, and (ii) a septage treatment plant in the southern part of Metro Manila.

With about 2 million cubic meters of wastewater generated daily, and only 17% of them getting treated before disposal to water bodies around the metro, water pollution has destroyed most of Manila Bay and the nearby Laguna de Bay. Manila Water and Maynilad have both conceptualized a 25-year program that ensures 100% wastewater collection and treatment for Metro Manila. With the MWMP, their efforts would be supported and would not only aid in improving the current state of the surrounding environment but also contribute a boost in recreational and tourism opportunities.

==== Japan International Cooperation Agency ====
The Japan International Cooperation Agency (JICA), along with the international community striving to achieve the targets of United Nations' Millennium Development Goals (MDG), has been campaigning to make a significant reduction in the number of people who still lack access to safe drinking water. Reliable water resources management, improvement of access to water supply in urban areas, reduction of non-revenue water (NRW), improvement of water/energy use, sustainable rural water supply, and promotion of improved sanitation in developing countries are the main issues that JICA prioritizes. In 2008, through the Development Bank of the Philippines, about $200 million was loaned to the Philippines to fund local governments and domestic private-sector companies for the development of water supply and sewerage facilities. Despite the establishment of funding, financing will only be granted to water utilities if the business management improves, hence JICA actively assists the water supply utilities' capacity development through practical cooperation with financial aid. JICA not only works to improve access to safe drinking water in urban areas of developing countries, but also aids water facilities with business planning and management.

== Issues ==
Access to water is recognized as a basic human right in the Philippines, according to the Philippine Commission on Human Rights. The Philippines is also a party to the International Covenant on Economic, Social, and Cultural Rights, which guarantees the right to water under international human rights law.

=== Drinking water quality ===
Water quality usually does not meet the standards set by the national government, especially in urban areas. As a result, waterborne diseases remain to be a severe public health concern in the country. About 4,200 people die each year due to contaminated drinking water.

=== Non-revenue water ===
Non-revenue water (NRW) is defined as the difference between the amount of water put into the distribution system and the amount of water billed to consumers. It is usually used as an indicator for water utility performance. High levels of non-revenue water usually indicate low-quality water utility. It has three components:

- Physical losses, which consist of leakage from the system caused by poor operations and maintenance, the lack of active leakage control, and poor quality of underground assets.
- Commercial losses, caused by under-registration of water meters, errors in data handling, and theft.
- Unbilled authorized consumption, which includes water used by a specific utility for operational purposes (e.g. firefighting and specific consumer groups).

Non-revenue water decreased in the East Zone of Metro Manila since privatization. In 1996, Manila had an NRW of 61%, while capital cities from other Asian countries ranged from having 35–38%. In 2002, NRW dropped to 53% in the East Zone. On the other hand, non-revenue water in the West Zone increased as the primary waterwork utility encountered severe financial problems. According to Manila Water, one of the private concessionaires, the share of NRW continued to fall until the end of 2010 where it reached 11%.

According to the National Water Resources Board (NWRB), the average share of NRW among participating service providers was 27.5% in 2004. The particularly high NRW of Manila's West Zone was confirmed to have a record with 68%. Generally, the smaller utilities performed better concerning NRW than the larger ones. However, many NRW data are based on estimates, given the fact that only 15 of the 45 service providers had 100% production and consumption metering coverage.

=== Labor productivity ===
The number of staff was reduced at the Metropolitan Waterworks and Sewerage System (MWSS) after privatization. On average, 10 employees were responsible for 1,000 connections in 1996. Fast forward to 2002, only about 4 employees were left, reflecting a decrease of around 58%. According to LWUA, only about 7 employees per 1,000 connections worked in water districts in 2002. In contrast to water districts, LGUs have an average of 21 employees per 1,000 connections in 2002. However, small LGUs still suffer from their low number of total connections.

=== Other challenges ===
The NWRB Philippines Towns Water Utilities 2004 Data Book found an average of 7 employees per 1,000 connections in 2004. On average, private utilities performed best and systems directly managed by LGUs performed worst. Not surprisingly, providers with more than 10,000 connections need significantly fewer employees per connection than those with fewer than 10,000 connections.

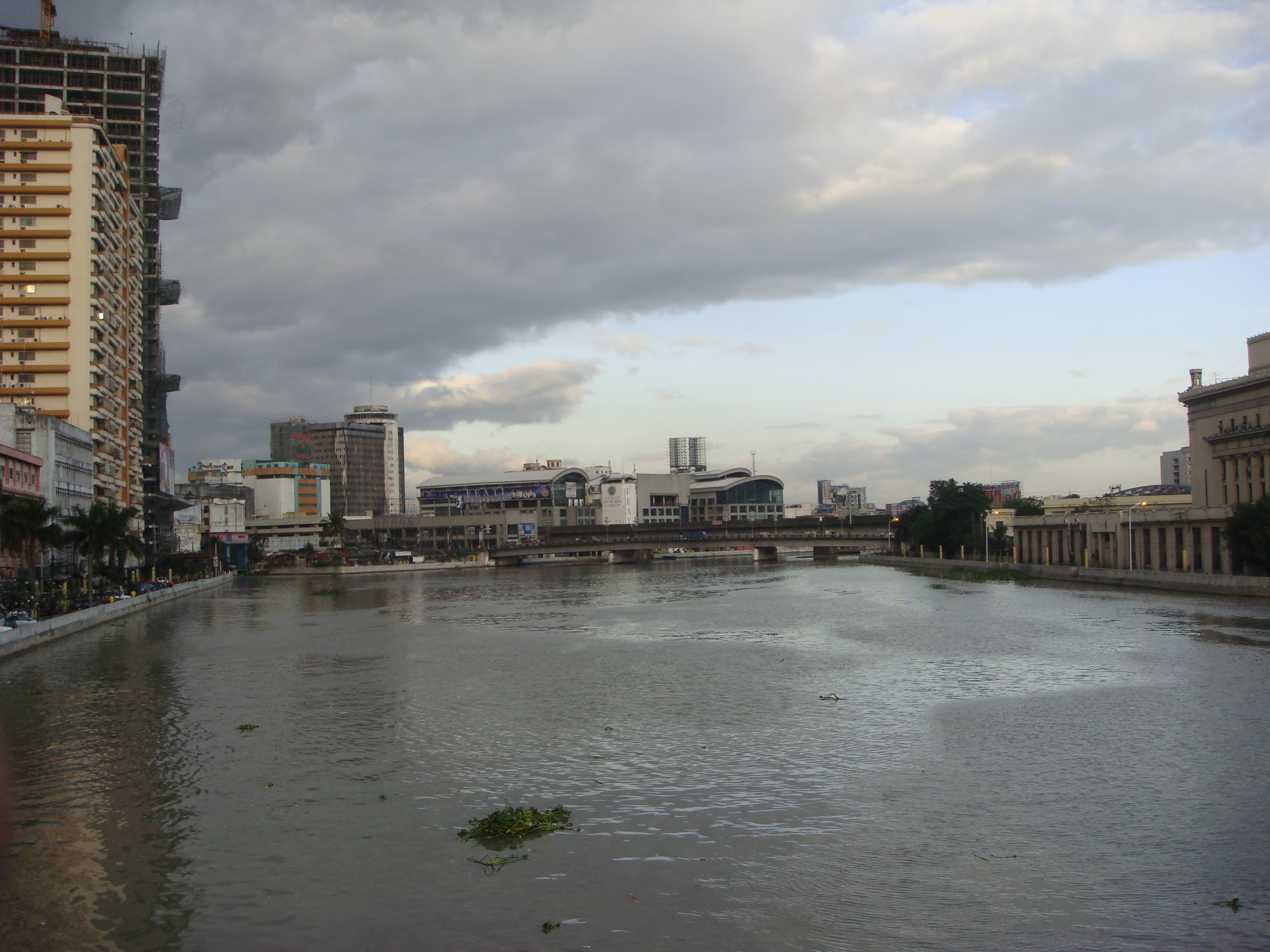
The Pasig River in Manila, one of the world's most polluted rivers.

==== Population and pollution ====
One-third of Philippine river systems are considered suitable for public water supply. It is estimated that in 2025, water availability will be marginal in most major cities and in 8 of the 19 major river basins. Besides severe health concerns, water pollution also leads to problems in the Fishing and Tourism industries. The national government recognized the problem and, since 2004, has sought to introduce sustainable water resources development management.

With rapid increases in population, urbanization, and industrialization, the quality of Philippine's waters has been reduced, especially in densely populated areas and regions of industrial and agricultural activities. According to data from the DENR and PEM, domestic, agricultural and industrial wastewater are the three main sources of water pollution. These are also known as "point sources" that emanate toxic substances into "non-point sources" or certain bodies of water. Domestic wastewater consists of sewage containing organic waste, solids, and coliforms produced by domestic activities such as laundry, bathing, cooking, and other kitchen activities. Agricultural wastewater, the major source of pollution in rural areas, contains pollutants resulting from agricultural and livestock activities like the maintenance of piggeries which usually do not have proper wastewater treatment facilities. Different industries also contribute largely to water pollution. Industrial activities such as slaughterhouses, and manufacturing of food, textile, and paper emit large amounts of organic waste.

==== El Niño and global warming ====
El Niño, a weather phenomenon occurring about every two to seven years when warm water in the western tropical Pacific Ocean shifts Eastward, causing ocean temperatures to rise, last developed in the country in late 2014. For the past several decades, it has been observed that its occurrence has increased due to climate change as a result of global warming. Its negative impacts may either be heavy rainfall or drought. El Niño greatly impacts the power supply, water supply, and agricultural sectors of the country. The reduced rainfall leading to drought causes a shortage in water supply, leading to water rationing in some situations, as well as hydropower and food shortage.

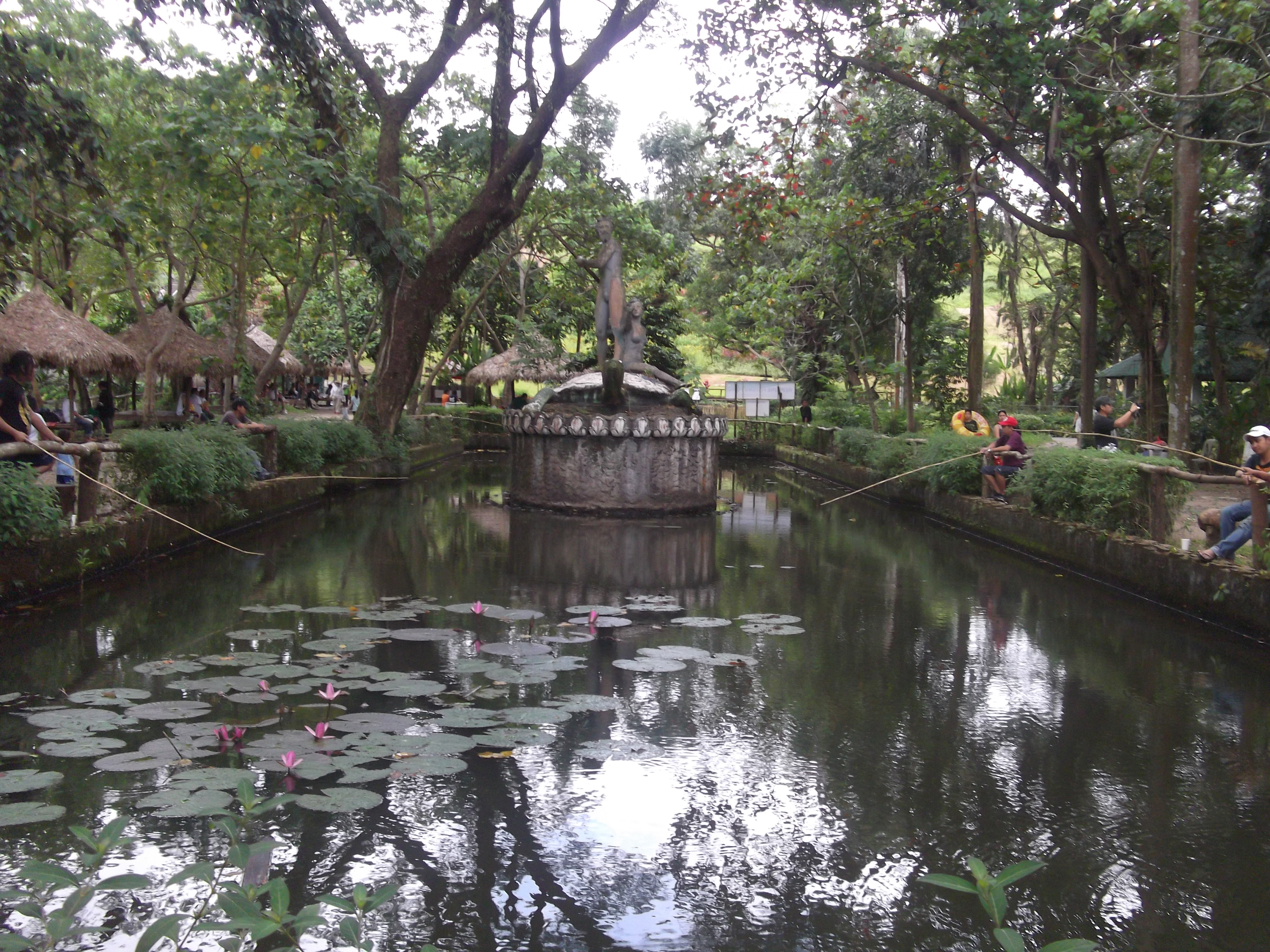
The La Mesa Watershed is the only remaining rainforest of its size in Metro Manila, Philippines.

==== Denudation of forest cover ====
The supply of water from most freshwater bodies usually comes from watersheds --- patches of forest cover that absorb rainwater and channel it into streams, rivers, and eventually dams were many human communities (especially Metro Manila) source their freshwater. Despite the role of the forest in the replenishment and maintenance of both ground and surface water, the Philippines is considered to be one of the most severely deforested countries in the tropics as it has lost more than 97% of its original forest cover in the last 50 years.

==== Saltwater intrusion ====
Metro Manila is one of the areas in most risk of saltwater intrusion. Since the late 1960s, saline water intrusion has been evident along with the coastal areas of Metro Manila, stretching from Las Pinas to Malabon. The shallow water table aquifer is in direct contact with the sea in these coastal areas. The over-pumping of groundwater results to cones of depression which increases the risk of saltwater intrusion. According to a joint study by MWSS and JICA in 1991, most groundwater samples from Metro Manila's coastal areas were salinized. However, compared to the early 1980s, the saline intrusion was found to have improved conditions because of the conversion of water source from groundwater to surface water upon the completion of the Manila Water Supply Project II in 1987. Aside from excessive withdrawal of groundwater, seepage of brackish water along the Pasig River is another cause of saltwater intrusion because of seawater movement during tides.

== See also ==
- Pollution of the Pasig River
- Environmental issues in the Philippines
