= Lorenzo Tañada =

Filipino politician (1898–1992)

The Honorable Lorenzo Tañada
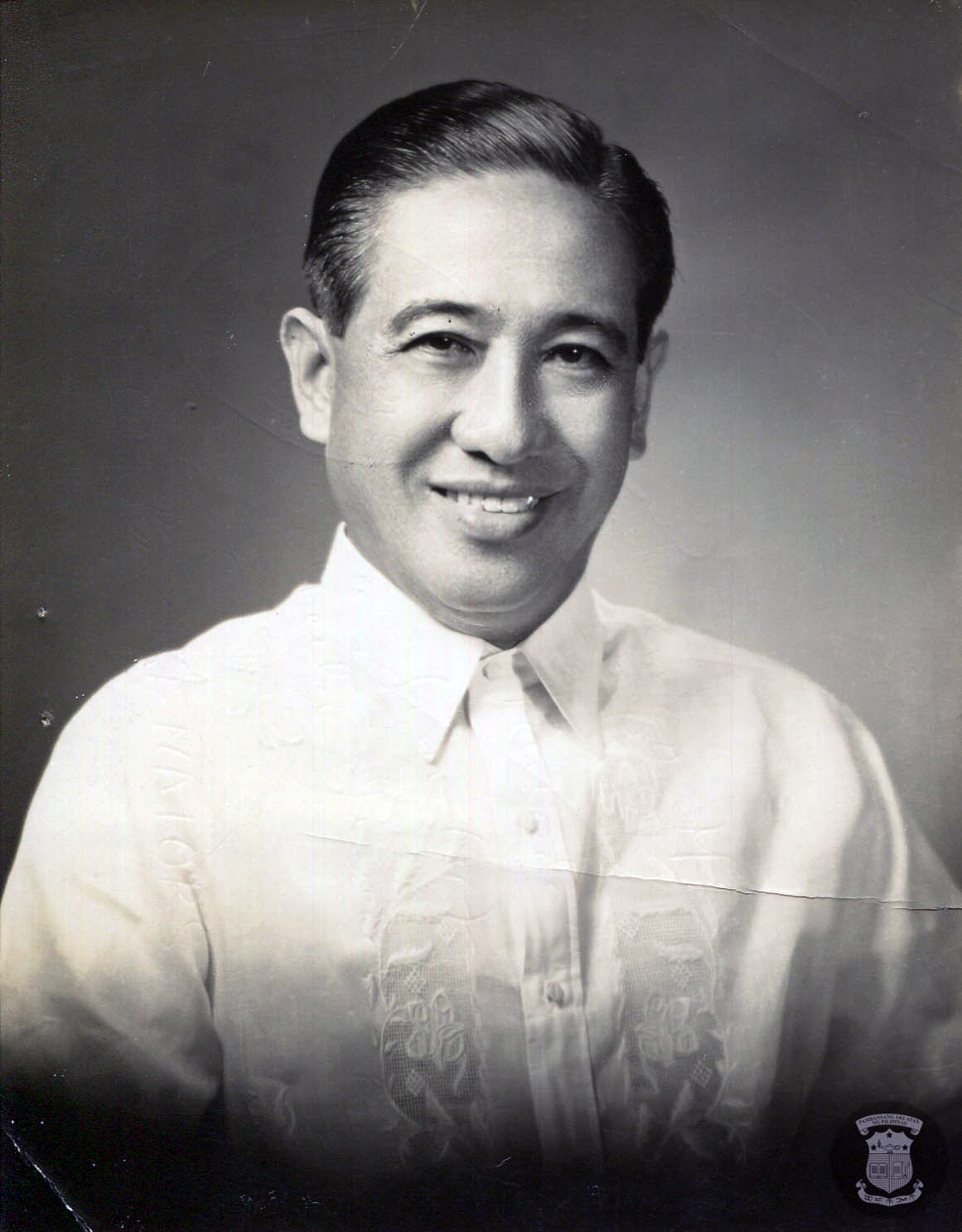

Senate Minority Leader
- In office January 25, 1954 – December 30, 1957
- Preceded by: Carlos P. Garcia
- Succeeded by: Ambrosio Padilla

Senator of the Philippines
- In office December 30, 1947 – December 30, 1971

Solicitor General of the Philippines
- In office July 1, 1945 – December 30, 1947
- President: Sergio Osmeña; Manuel Roxas
- Preceded by: Sixto dela Costa
- Succeeded by: Manuel Lim
- In office July 1, 1940 – June 30, 1941
- President: Manuel L. Quezon
- Preceded by: Roman Ozaeta
- Succeeded by: Sixto dela Costa

Personal details
- Born: Lorenzo Tañada y Martínez; August 10, 1898 Gumaca, Tayabas, Captaincy General of the Philippines (Note: now Gumaca, Quezon, Philippines)
- Died: May 28, 1992 (aged 93) Manila, Philippines
- Resting place: Loyola Memorial Park Marikina, Philippines
- Party: PDP–Laban (1986–1992)
- Other political affiliations: Laban (1978–1986); Independent (1972–1978); NCP (1957–1972); Citizens' (1953–1957); Liberal (1947–1953)
- Spouse: Expedita Ebarle (m. 1927)
- Relations: Erin Tañada (grandson)
- Children: 9, including Wigberto and Lorenzo Jr.
- Parent(s): Vicente Tañada; Anastacia Martinez
- Education: De La Salle University; University of the Philippines (LL.B); Harvard University (LL.M); University of Santo Tomas (DCL)
- Occupation: Politician, statesman
- Profession: Lawyer
- Website: https://lorenzomtanada.org/
Association football career
- Position: Goalkeeper
International career
Years	Team	Apps	(Gls)
c.1923–1925	Philippines		
Medal record
Men's football
Representing Philippines
Far Eastern Championship Games
Silver medal – second place	1923 Osaka	Team
Silver medal – second place	1925 Manila	Team

Lorenzo Martinez "Ka Tanny" Tañada Sr. CCLH (Tagalog: [tɐˈɲada], August 10, 1898 – May 28, 1992) was a Filipino statesman, lawyer, human and civil rights defender, and national athlete. He is often referred to as the "Grand Old Man of Philippine Politics."

He served as Solicitor General for two terms. Following the 1947 election, where he received the highest number of votes among Senate candidates, he served four consecutive terms from 1947 until 1971, for a total of 24 straight years in the senate. He opposed the martial law administration under Ferdinand Marcos, participating and leading public demonstrations. He also advocated for the removal of US military bases in the Philippines through the Anti-Bases Coalition (ABC).

Tañada served as the campaign manager of the Lakas ng Bayan (Laban) candidates that ran against Marcos's Kilusang Bagong Lipunan in the 1978 parliamentary election. After the assassination of former Sen. Ninoy Aquino, he was the chairman of the Justice for Aquino, Justice for All (JAJA) movement that sought to oust Marcos. Senator Tañada was also a co-founder of the Free Legal Assistance Group (FLAG) with Joker Arroyo and José W. Diokno. FLAG is the largest group of human rights lawyers nationwide. They spearheaded the nationalist cause in the 1970s and 1980s as an agreement in the 1960s with Larry Henares and others.

He was also the founding chairman of a merged party called Bayan in 1985, and he founded the Nuclear-Free Philippines Coalition or NFPC, which successfully prevented the opening of the Bataan Nuclear Power Plant under the Marcos administration.

In his youth, he was also a national football team goalkeeper and was part of the Philippine national team that bagged silver medals at the 1923 and 1925 Far Eastern Championship Games, the precursor to the famous Asian Games.

He is the father of former Philippine Senator Wigberto Tañada and the grandfather of former Deputy Speaker Erin Tañada.

== Early life ==
Tañada was born in Gumaca, Quezon on August 10, 1898, the son of Vicente Tañada, who served as the last gobernadorcillo of Gumaca town in Quezon under the Spanish colonial government, and Anastacia Martinez-Tañada. His actions in life were governed by the philosophy ingrained in him by his mother. The phrase "fear of God is the start of wisdom" guided him in all his social dealings.

The same week, US conquered Spain's navy and captured the Philippines as its colony. As an elementary student in Gumaca, he joined a protest against his school's American principal. The protest was prompted by the principal's order for school children to stay during weekends to build a playground, which prevented them from going home to their parents. Tañada said he was the smallest child and remembered when the principal was shocked to see he was one of the complainants. This was considered to be his very first rally.

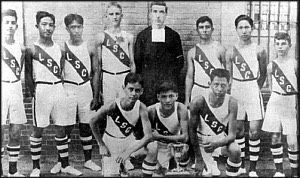
La Salle basketball team in 1914, Tañada standing second from left

In 1915, Tañada moved to the new De La Salle College, Manila, now called De La Salle University or DLSU, a school run by the Christian Brothers and graduated at the top of the class in 1918. He claimed it was the first time he saw his mother very emotional as she pinned the special medal on Tañada's breast during the ceremony.

As a law student at the University of the Philippines (U.P.), Tañada, completed his Reserve Officers' Training Corps (ROTC) prior to the academic Philippine educational system and obtained the rank of major, and was a lead actor in plays. He was also a national football team goalkeeper and was part of the Philippine national team that bagged silver medals at the 1923 and 1925 Far Eastern Championship Games, the precursor to the Asian Games.

As a college student, during U.P.'s Armistice Day, he we would exhort "his fellow cadets to take their training seriously as they will soon be called upon to use their skill against the Americans if the country's independence is not granted".

He recalled being allowed to make this speech at the request of the Filipino administrators. Though after the speech the Filipino administrators told him to resign from the ROTC before the American general may try to punish him. In 1924 he topped the government's examination for pensionados and obtained a free scholarship to study in the U.S. In 1928, he earned his Master of Laws from Harvard University. He was the principal protégé of American Supreme Court justice Felix Frankfurter. He also acquired a Doctor in Civil Law meritissimus from the University of Santo Tomas.

In 1947, together with prominent justices and lawyers, they founded the MLQ Law School, which became the Manuel L. Quezon University in 1958 upon signing of the charter granted by the Ministry of Education, Sports and Culture. The Monzon Hall is currently situated in R. Hidalgo Street while the Law Building is at Arlegui Street. Tañada was also a founder of the Civil Liberties Union in 1937 together with friend J.B.L. Reyes.

== Political career ==
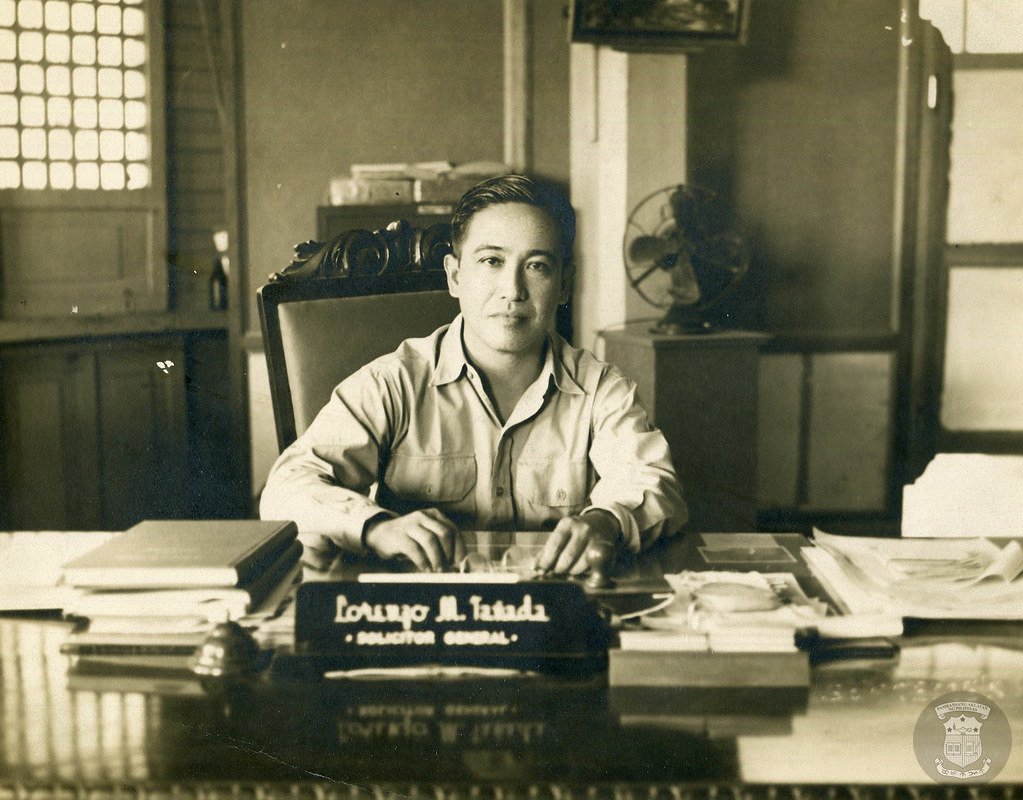
Tañada during his tenure as Solicitor General

Tañada served as the pre-war and first post-war solicitor general from 1940 to 1941 and 1945 to 1947, tasked with the monumental collaboration cases against many prominent figures, where he earned the respect and admiration of many of his peers and countrymen.

Tañada was first elected to the Philippine senate in 1947 where he topped the elections, placing 1st among senatorial candidates, the first of his 4 successful senatorial elections.

Tañada was the chief prosecutor against Japanese collaborators. Due to his political reputation, Tañada became a Filipino praised by all sectors of Philippine society, a person honored by both the Communist Party of the Philippines and the Reform the Armed Forces Movement, and a man who was acknowledged as a man of principles even by those whom Tañada himself once charged as "collaborators".

He was a petitioner in the landmark Supreme Court case Tañada vs. Tuvera, which declared that unpublished laws (a characteristic of the Presidential Decrees of Marcos) are without effect.

Tañada was also a longtime opponent of the U.S. role in the Philippines. He was the organizer of the Anti-Bases Coalition (ABC) together with lawyer and former senator José W. Diokno and also led other groups that rallied public opposition to the presence of American troops in the Philippines.

Tañada is often called the "grand old man of Philippine politics", due to his reputation as one of the Philippine's foremost nationalists. He was a familiar fixture during the Martial law era of Ferdinand Marcos, leading rallies and demonstrations. Due to his esteem among national democrats, Tañada chaired some national democrats coalitions in his later years to oppose Marcos in the streets.

After Marcos' opponent, Ninoy Aquino, was assassinated, JAJA was formed with co-leader Diokno, who is called the father of human rights advocacy, which made JAJA the first united front built to stop Marcos. Tañada was elected the chair of the alliance. However, JAJA could not unite the different competing groups and ideologies, and eventually former members left to form different alliances, with the largest being Butz Aquino's Kongreso ng Mamamayang Pilipino (Congress of the Filipino People) or "KOMPIL", of which Tañada served as one of the chief delegates. In 1985, he became the founding chairperson of Bagong Alyansang Makabayan (Bayan). Eventually, Marcos was removed from power and exiled in 1986.

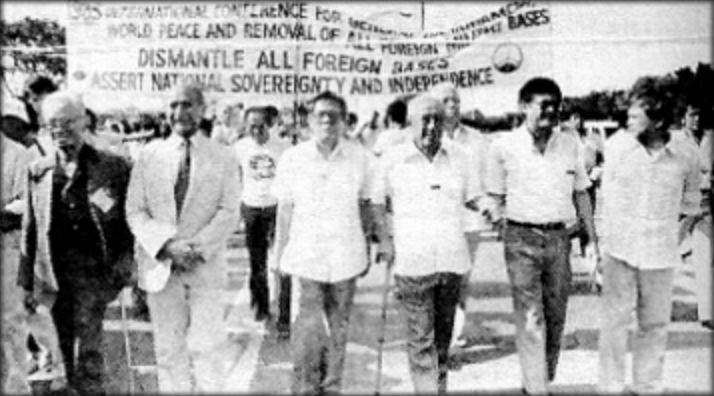
Anti-Bases Coalition Rally with José W. Diokno, J. B. L. Reyes and Joker Arroyo in 1983

During Corazon Aquino's presidency, he was a staunch anti-U.S. Bases activist and an anti-nuclear power plant advocate.

On September 16, 1991, Tañada received a standing ovation from the Philippine Senate after its rejection of a new lease for the U.S. Naval Base Subic Bay, which was the last American military installation in the Philippines.

== Later life ==
Tañada died in 1992, on the way to a hospital, at the age of 93. Days before his death, Tañada had already been undergoing kidney dialysis. He was survived by his wife, Expedita Ebarle-Tañada, nine children, including his son former Senator Wigberto Tañada, and some grandchildren, and including his grandson Erin Tañada. Tañada also is survived by his great-grandchildren and great-great-grandchildren. He is buried at Loyola Memorial Park.

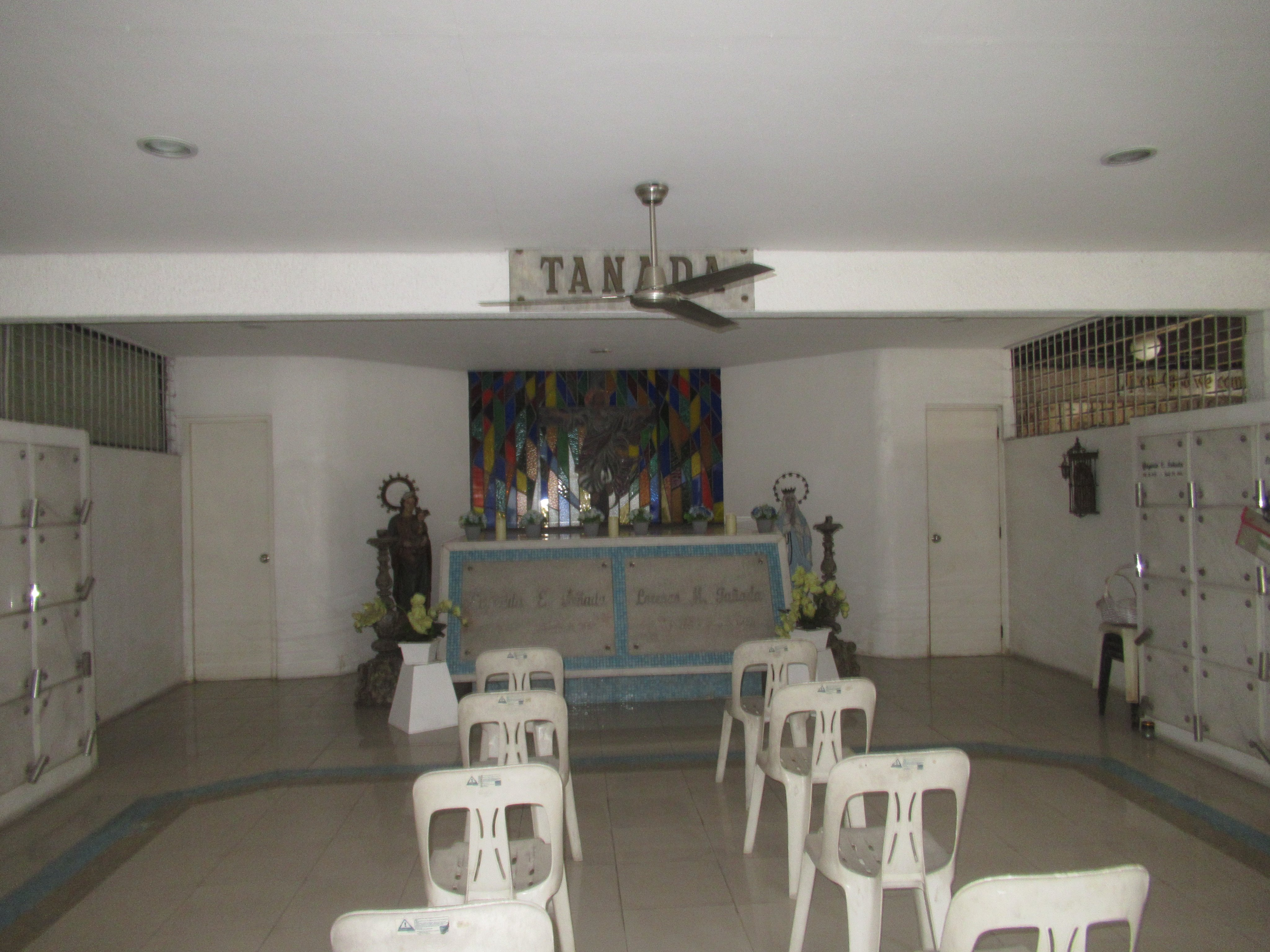
Lorenzo - Expedita Ebarle-Tañada tombs

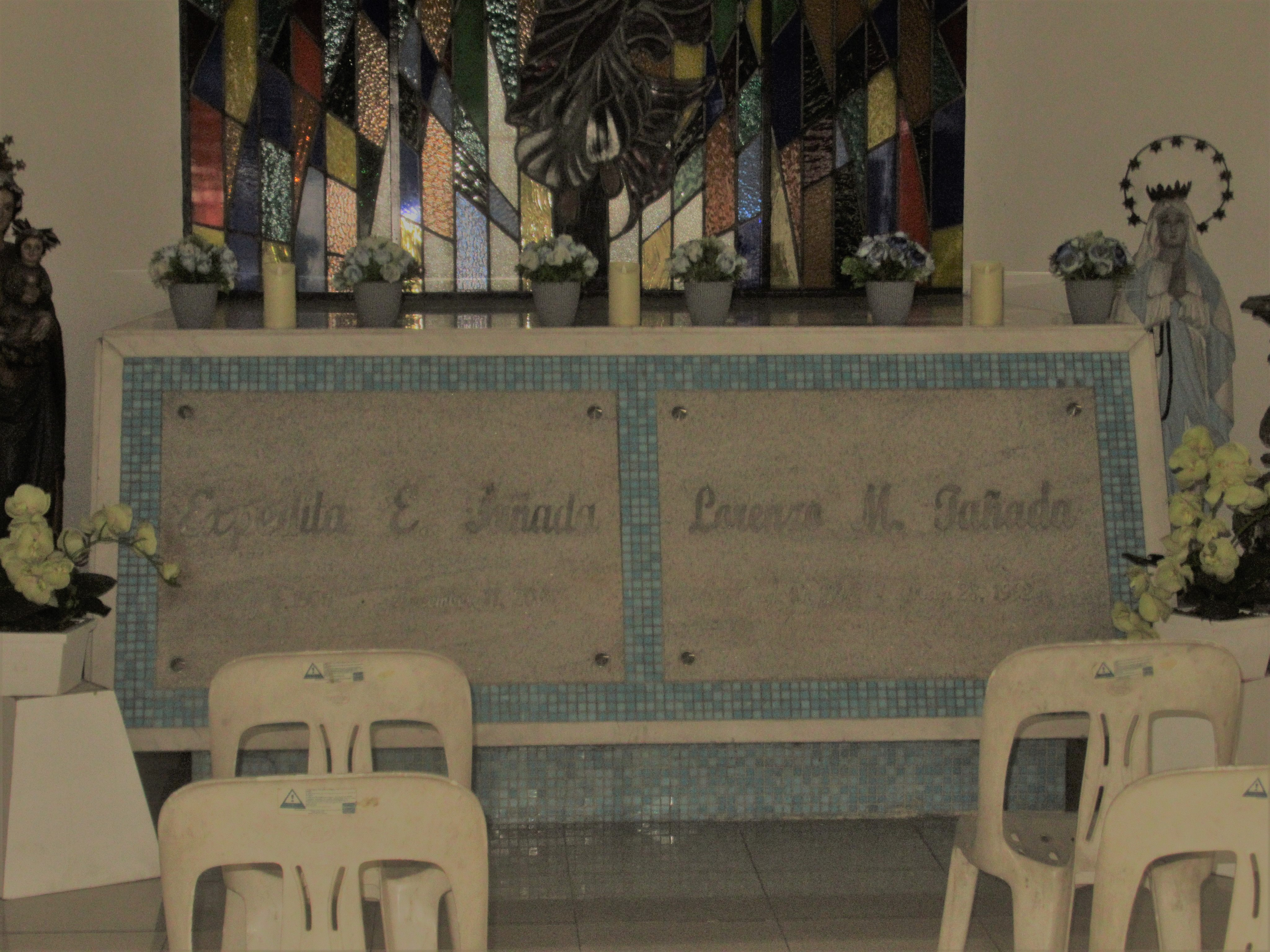
Loyola Memorial Park family mausoleum

== Legacy ==
He received the Philippine Legion of Honor, highest rank of Chief Commander (CCLH) in 1988. Tañada was issued a stamp on the centennial of his birth in 1998 under the category of Great Filipinos.

In his hometown of Gumaca, Quezon, August 10 is celebrated every year as Lorenzo M. Tañada Day, a special non-working holiday, with historical-themed festivities held usually near the marker of his birth and at the site of his bust at the Gumaca National High School outdoor area. A road 300 m long was named L. Tañada Street and is located near the presidential residence called the White House; the residential-cum-commercial road starts at Mimosa Dr. near the Filinvest Mimosa Leisure Estate, and is intersected right in the middle by Cardinal Santos Avenue until it reaches C.P. Garcia while directly facing Clark Development Corporation in Clark Freeport Zone, Pampanga.

He was a 1988 The Outstanding Filipino (TOFIL) awardee for Freedom Advocacy. His son Wigberto Tañada also received a TOFIL award in 1999 for Government and Public Service.

Tañada's name is inscribed on the Bantayog ng mga Bayani Wall of Remembrance, which recognizes heroes who fought against martial law in the Philippines under Ferdinand E. Marcos.

There have been movements and calls, as well as bills have been filed in both senate and house of representatives in the 16th Philippine Congress, to rename Commonwealth avenue to Sen. Lorenzo Tañada avenue, to honor his legacy of Filipino nationalism and independence. Other calls have been made to rename Marcos Highway to Lorenzo Tañada Ave.; along with Shaw Blvd. to Jovito Salonga Blvd.; Taft Ave. to José W. Diokno Ave.; and Imelda Ave. to Sen. Geronima Pengson Ave. De La Salle University put up a special museum called the Lorenzo M. Tañada Memorabilia Room as a permanent part of the campus. Visits require early appointments. They have also instituted the Lorenzo M. Tañada CHIMES Award for faculty. The De La Salle University Tañada-Diokno School of Law was named in his and "Ka Pepe" Diokno's honor on Diokno's centennial on February 26, 2022.

On 21 September 2021, he was honoured as Lasallian heroes against Martial Law along with Jose W. Diokno and Bishop Felix Paz Perez of Cavite.

Books about his life include:

- The Essential Tañada by Renato Constantino published in 1989
- The Odyssey of Lorenzo Tañada by Agnes Bailen published 1998
- Lorenzo M. Tañada, in celebration of his 100th birth anniversary, 1898-1998 published by the Lorenzo M. Tañada Foundation in 1998
- Lorenzo M. Tañada as Others Saw Him: Contemporaneous Observations on a Filipino Leader and Hero by Jose N. Endriga published in 1998

Other features include "Lorenzo Tañada, Brief life of a Philippine patriot: 1898-1992" by Christopher Capozzola, in the Nov-Dec 2020 issue of Harvard Magazine, "Sen. Lorenzo Tañada Sr. – national heartthrob" by Argyll Geducos, Mario Casayuran, and Hannah Torregoza published August 5, 2018, and "A Tañada Dynasty or Legacy?" published by Action for Economic Reforms in March 2013.

== Election history ==
Electoral history of Lorenzo Tañada
Year	Office	Party	Votes received				Result
Year	Office	Party	Total	%	P.	Swing	Result
1947	Senator of the Philippines	Liberal	1,570,390	48.11	1st	—N/a	Won
1953	Senator of the Philippines	NCP	2,156,717	49.85	2nd	—N/a	Won
1959	Senator of the Philippines	NCP	2,029,200	31.74	7th	—N/a	Won
1965	Senator of the Philippines	NCP	3,014,618	39.61	7th	—N/a	Won
1957	Vice President of the Philippines	NCP	344,685	7.33	4th	—N/a	Lost
