= Basilan Jaycees =

Philippine service organization

Junior Chamber International Basilan Inc.
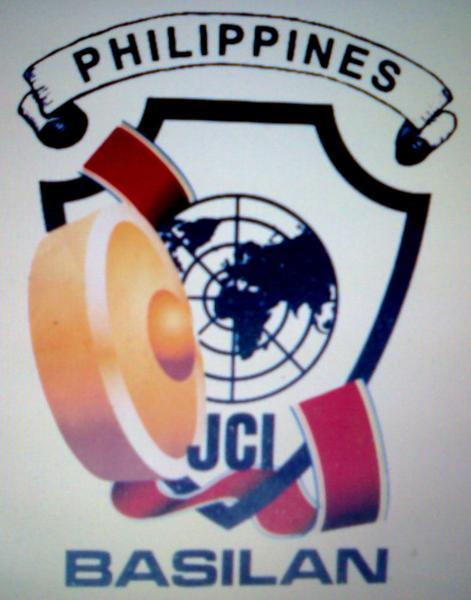
- Founded: January 11, 1949
- Founder: Dr. Isidro Sta. Elena
- Type: Service / NGO
- Purpose: Individual, Community, International, Business
- Location: Isabela City, Basilan, Philippines
- Origins: St. Louis, Missouri, USA
- Region served: Basilan Province
- Method: Community service
- Members: 25 regular
- Key people: Local Organization President JCI Mem. Ma. Yzabelle Sigrid Yu-Tang; Secretary General JCI Mem. Christopher Rey Diaz
- Volunteers: 600 alumni

Junior Chamber International – Basilan Inc. (Philippines), otherwise known as the Basilan Jaycees, extended on January 11, 1949, by JCI Manila and JCI Zamboanga, registered under the Laws of the Republic of the Philippines with the Securities and Exchange Commission (SEC) as the Junior Chamber of Basilan City, Inc. on August 26, 1965, is an affiliate of Junior Chamber International Philippines, Inc. (JCIP) and Junior Chamber International (JCI), A Worldwide Federation of Young Leaders and Entrepreneurs.

== Headquarters ==
The Basilan Jaycee Clubhouse is currently located at Isabela City, Basilan 7300

== History ==
=== Basilan Junior Chamber of Commerce ===
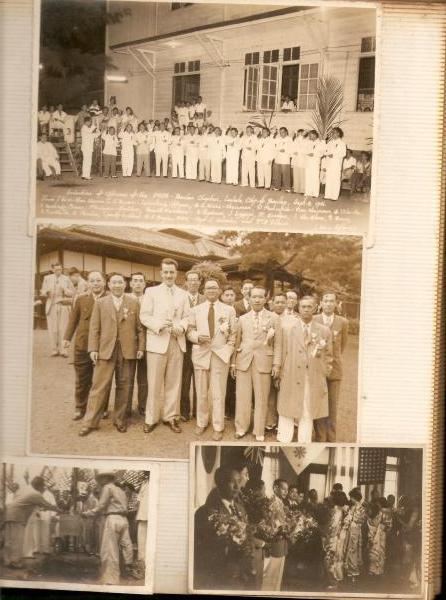
Charter Induction of the Basilan Junior Chamber of Commerce, December 11, 1949, at the old Basilan City Hall Courtyard; Middle and Bottom photos: Basilan Jaycees delegation at the 1950 Manila World Congress)

The Basilan Junior Chamber of Commerce was organized on January 11, 1949, in a Joint Chapter Extension Project of the Manila and Zamboanga Jaycees. It included some of Basilan’s most active and civic-minded personalities in law, public service, medicine and business at the outset. Its charter president (1949–1950), Dr. Isidro Sta. Elena, eventually became JCP regional vice president for Northern Mindanao in 1951–1952. National president Joaquin V. Gonzalez flew in from Manila to witness the induction of the chapter’s 3rd president (1951), Judge Doroteo de Guzman. 4th president (1952), Dr. Alejandro C. Infante, founder of the Infante Hospital in Isabela City, was the longest-serving adviser of the chapter, whose service to the organization spanned over 50 years, until his death in 2007. He was followed by a succession of able young presidents who steered the chapter in its early years. Prominent businessmen Amado Borja (1953), Thomas Ba Leong (1953), Carlos F. Tan (1955), and Judge Francisco S. Atilano (1955) were among the pioneers of this intrepid group of young leaders who invested the chapter with a strong foundation based on an enduring vision of leadership and service to the community.

The 8th president (1957), retired Supreme Court associate justice Regino C. Hermosisima, Jr., and current 3-term regular member of the Judicial and Bar Council, now in his early 90s, also became a JCP regional vice president for Northern Mindanao (1954–1955). He presided over the controversial Aquino-Galman Double Murder Case in 1983. He has since retired from the Supreme Court, but has remained active in civic affairs as the honorary national chairman of the Young Men’s Christian Association (YMCA) of the Philippines. He was followed by the chapter’s first elected two-termer, Emilio Lim (1958 & 1959) and then by Atty. Laurencio Saavedra (1960 & 1961) who also served two terms, Ricardo Madayag (1962), and then by Judge Cesar S. Principe (1963).

=== Junior Chamber of Basilan City, Inc. ===
The chapter was officially registered with the Securities and Exchange Commission (SEC) on August 26, 1965, as the Junior Chamber of Basilan City, Inc., during the term of its 13th president (1964 & 1965), also a two-termer, and who likewise became the first JCI senator of the chapter, JCI Sen. Simplicio A. Bonifacio. He then went on to become a JCP regional vice president for Southern Mindanao (1968). A local politician, he served in the Basilan Provincial Board for three terms before retiring in the early 1990s. He was followed by fellow lawyers Selso Manzanaris (1966) and Ricardo G. Mon (1967), who was on his third term as a City Councilor by the time he took over administration of the chapter.

The organization became a force in local politics towards the late 1960s, when young politicians started to quickly fill up its ranks. Often split into two main opposing Liberal (LP) and Nacionalista (NP) wings, the organization mirrored the realities of local politics, serving as the most prestigious training ground for young politicians in the local arena. Chapter elections were hotly contested and these rivalries and factions were soon reflected in the floors of the Basilan City Council throughout the rest of the decade, well into the early years of the 1970s. As the organization continued to attract the sons of local political families of Basilan, this same period saw oppositionist young Turks take control of the chapter. Being young themselves, presidents Reynaldo Martinez (1968), Armando L. Salvador (1969), and Quirico Tan (1970) worked closely with opposition stalwart and 6-term Basilan City Mayor Leroy S. Brown in denouncing the increasingly difficult situation that unfolded in Manila and Mindanao. By then, Pres. Ferdinand E. Marcos' once popular administration seemed to unravel by the day, kicking off with the bloody Jabidah Massacre, followed by the Moro Uprising of the Moro National Liberation Front (MNLF), and then finally by the increasingly violent student-led First Quarter Storm militant street actions in 1969.

Responding to the need for the chapter to touch base with Basilan’s core Muslim constituencies, even as the Nur Misuari-led secessionist movement continued to wreak havoc in the countryside, the members elected its first Muslim president (1971) in the person of a young Ulbert Ulama Tugung, a learned scholar and respected public servant who became a JCP regional vice president for Southern Mindanao (1977). He was ultimately appointed by Pres. Corazon C. Aquino to be the first Regional Governor of the Lupong Tagapagpaganap ng Pook (LTP) or the Regional Administration for Western Mindanao and Sulu. Sadly, his exemplary leadership was cut short by an assassin’s bullet. His wife, Jayceerette PP Elnorita Pamaran Tugung, was appointed LTP Regional Governor at his death, and went on to win as Congresswoman of Basilan in 1992–1995. He was followed by NP party member JCI Sen. Aniceto G. Mon (1972) the twin brother of the chapter's 15th president, Ricardo Mon.

Then on December 21, 1972, Pres. Ferdinand E. Marcos declared martial law and promptly placed Basilan City under a military government, presided over by Col. Tomas G. Nanquil, Jr., then the brigade commander of 24th Infantry Brigade stationed in Basilan, and then by Rear Admiral Romulo Espaldon, commanding officer of the Philippine Armed Forces' Southern Command. Basilan City was summarily abolished and replaced by the Province of Basilan as embodied in Presidential Decree No. 356 signed on December 27, 1973. Ten Municipalities were initially carved out of Basilan City through P.D. 593 promulgated on December 2, 1974.

Atty. Ricardo G. Mon, who was chapter president in 1967, was appointed as the first mayor of Isabela Municipality. At around this time, the Basilan Jayceerettes made its glamorous presence known. A series of socio-civic projects were conducted by the wives of the Jaycees as they promoted advocacies which ranged from a variety of environmental concerns to education and community health.

The 24th president (1973), JCI senator Louis W. Alano, started the first of what eventually came to be three terms at the helm of the chapter.

=== Silver jubilee ===
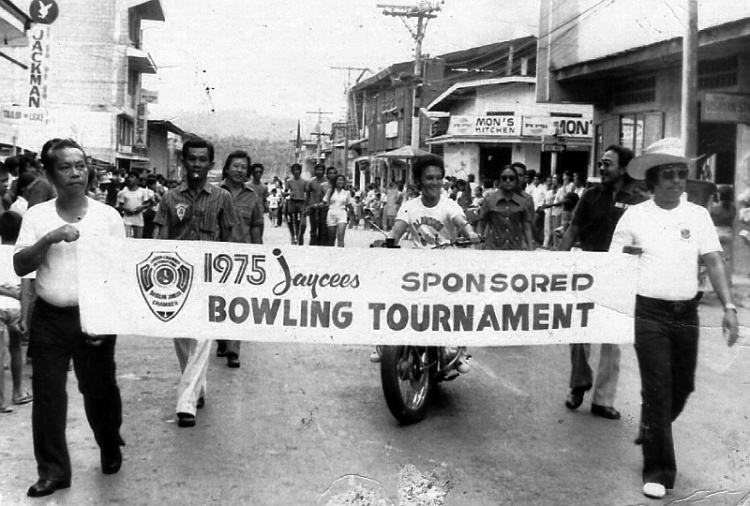
Basilan Jaycees Bowling Tournament, 1975

The chapter celebrated its silver jubilee under the administration of its 25th president (1974) Dr. Edgardo Eustaquio, a public servant and health practitioner, one of the founders of the Basilan Community Hospital and a three-term City Councilor of Isabela City. He was followed by 26th president (1975), local business taipan JCI Sen. Yu Chi Han, whose lasting legacy of forging deeper ties between the chapter and the local business community strengthened the Jaycees more so because the political situation deteriorated further as Basilan’s highlands was transformed into a combat zone where the military staged running gun-battles with the MNLF and isolated bandit groups, the “black shirts” or “munduhin” as they came to be romantically called. Also, as the countryside was rent asunder by a total breakdown in the peace and order, right-wing vigilante groups such as the Ilonggo-based “ilaga” and the Chavacano-Bisaya “mundo oscurro” rose up from nowhere and started to give the Muslim communities tit-for-tat.

=== Basilan Jaycees, Inc. ===
In the midst of the seeming chaos, the chapter evolved once again, officially changing its name to the Basilan Jaycees, Inc., during the incumbency of the 27th (1976) and 28th (1977) president, JCI Sen. Fernando S. Cariaga, the first in a line of educators and faithful church workers, whose steady management of the chapter’s affairs gave it a much-needed breather from all the politics which threatened to pull the chapter apart. A surprising economic upturn, engendered by the Marcos administration’s many infrastructure projects and programs, gave the chapter and the Basileños a healthy respite from the incessant conflict that bugged the island.

What followed were some of the most active years of the Jaycees, led by JCI Sen. Kieck Seng Tan (1978) under whose able leadership the very first batch of Lady Jaycees were inducted, JCI Sen. Roque C. Tan (1979), and then again by JCI Sen. Louis W. Alano (1980), Engr. Tahir I. Latip (1981), currently Basilan's Provincial Engineer and the second Muslim to be elected president, Napoleon P. Yu (1982), and then for a third time, again by JCI Sen. Louis W. Alano (1983) wherein the Jaycees initiated the creation of political action committees and associations such as the Concerned Citizens’ Aggrupation (CCA) which gathered the local community in indignation rallies against the Marcos dictatorship immediately after the assassination of Sen. Benigno Aquino Jr., as well as organized an Operation Quick Count for the 1986 Snap Elections, in close coordination with the National Movement for Free Elections (NAMFREL). For this, he was eventually appointed by President Corazon C. Aquino as the OIC governor of Basilan Province upon her accession in 1986. Currently, he is the deputy governor for Christian affairs of the Autonomous Region in Muslim Mindanao (ARMM).

The 35th (1984) and 36th president (1985), also a two-termer, was Atty. Alvin G. Dans, a scion of yet another of the most established families in Basilan. He was eventually elected mayor of the Municipality of Isabela for two terms, governor of the Province of Basilan, and Congressman of the Lone District of the Basilan, appointed by Pres. Fidel V. Ramos as Undersecretary of the Department of Transportation and Communications (DOTC), he eventually became the postmaster general of the Philippine Post Office. His wife, Jayceerette past president Athena Dans is a Commissioner of the Bureau of Customs. He was followed by the 37th president (1986), Perfecto C. Antonio, Jr., a three-termer in the Provincial Board of Basilan Province. The 38th president (1987), Nonito T. Ramirez, was the secretary of the Isabela City Council for some time.

=== Junior Chamber of Basilan, Inc. ===
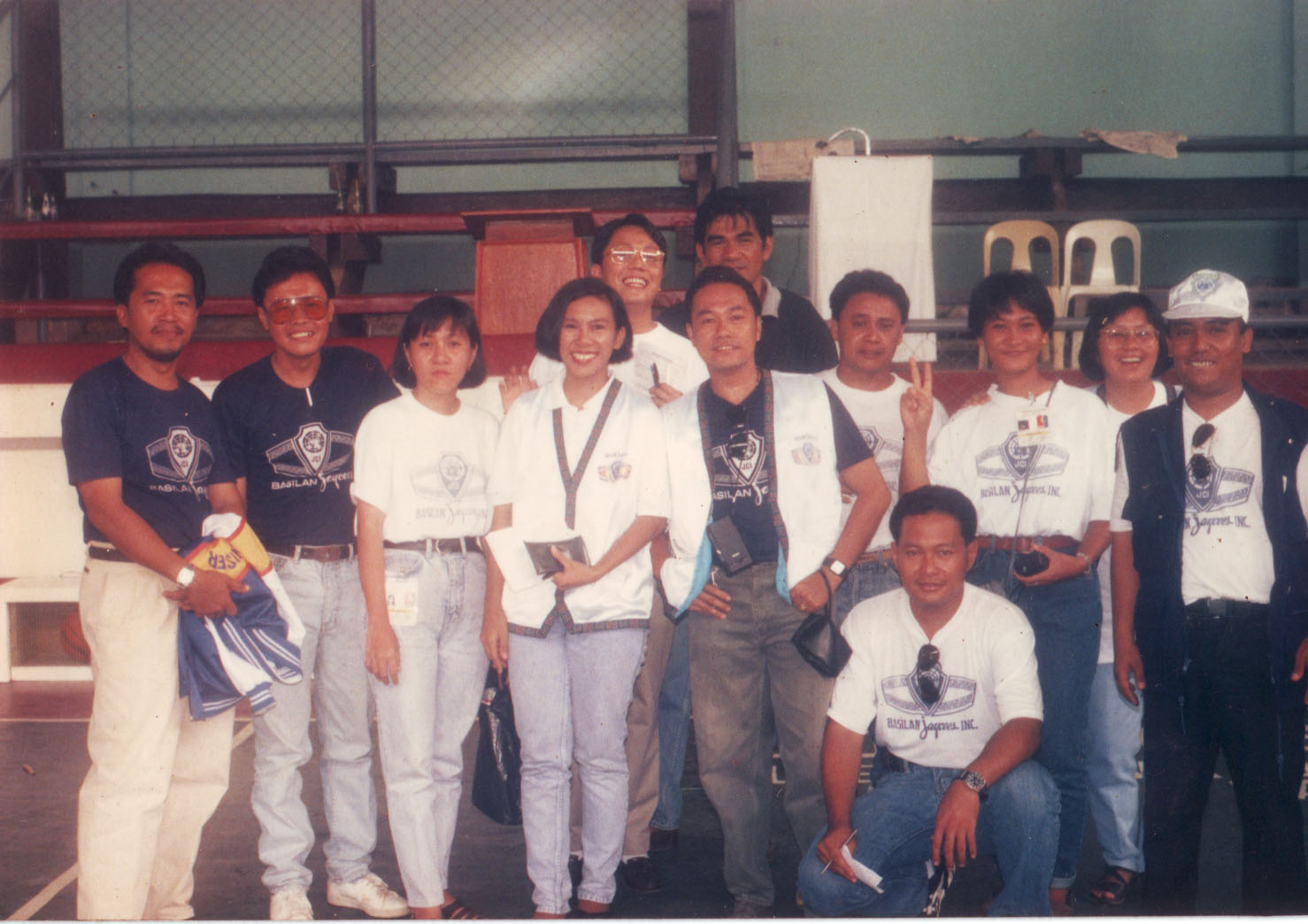
Basilan Jaycees Bingo Bonanza 1997

The name of the chapter was reverted to Junior Chamber of Basilan, Inc., under the auspices of the 39th (1988) and 40th president (1989), JCI Sen. Benedicto N. Peñaflor, following the JCI amendments during the World Congress in Taipei, Republic of China. He was followed by the 41st (1990) and 42nd president (1991), Michael M. Manapol, the Isabela City tourism officer from 1998 to 2007. A succession of presidents and leaders handled the chapter in the 1990s, even as the head of the Abu Sayyaf stole international headlines and e-wrote Basilan’s image. The chapter owes its existence in these times to the grit and temerity of Edgardo P. Ferrer (1992), businessman and entrepreneur, Rogelio J. Francisco (1993) an investment banker under whose term the Basilan Taguima Junior Jaycees was organized, Judge Danilo M. Bucoy (1994), the Regional Trial Court Judge who sentenced captured Abu Sayyaf terrorists to death, and the back-to-back two-termers Carlos F. Luy (1995 & 1996) and Edgar R. Suson (1997 & 1998).

=== Golden Anniversary ===
It is particularly remarkable to note, however, that it took the chapter all of half a century since its inception, and 20 years since its first female member was inducted, to finally elect its very first lady president. The chapter’s 50th president (1999) JCI Sen. Laura W. Alano, was likewise elected national vice president for Western Mindanao (2000). She was awarded ‘Most Outstanding National Vice President for Area V in 2000’ and is the first lady JCI Senator of the chapter. She was followed by JCI Mem. Ma. Theresa M. Alano (2000), who was appointed by Pres. Gloria Macapagal Arroyo as Assistant Secretary of the Department of Social Welfare and Development (DSWD) charged with Christian-Muslim Affairs and Mindanao in general, and then by JCI Mem. Tita Orbecido-Tan (2001), also a teacher, who spearheaded the creation of Junior Jaycee chapters in Basilan. The 53rd president (2002), JCI Mem. Reymond E. Bicariato, was the Administrator of the Philippine National Red Cross – Basilan Chapter during his incumbency and organized relief efforts and extended aid, also with the assistance of the Jaycees, to the hostages of the Abu Sayyaf kidnapping spree of 2001–2002, forging lasting ties with the troops in the US-RP Balikatan 02-1 Joint Military Exercises. The 54th president (2003), JCI Mem. Svetlana E. C. Sanchez, daughter of JCI Sen. Fernando Cariaga, signaled the generational shift in the chapter’s long history as the Baby Boomers eventually handed over control of the chapter to succeeding generations of JCI members.

=== Junior Chamber International Basilan Inc. & JCI Basileña ===
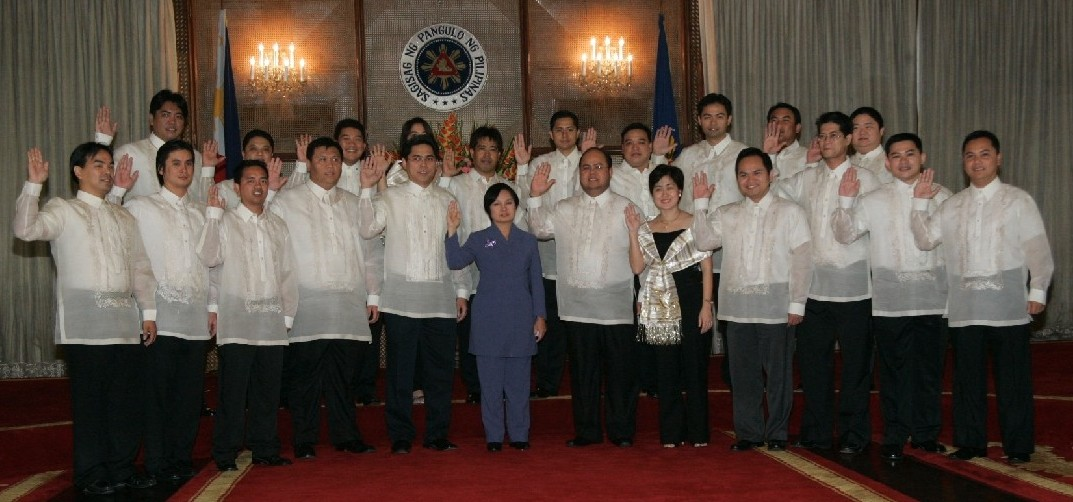
2006 national vice president for Western Mindanao JCI Mem. Jaime J. A. Rivera (Back row, 1st from the left) being inducted together with JCI Philippines Inc. national board members during the Ceremonial Oath Taking, Malacanang Palace, Manila, January 27, 2006, with H.E. Gloria Macapagal Arroyo, President of the Republic of the Philippines as Inducting Officer

Yet another page in the chapter’s history was finally turned as, following the JCI Corporate Identity Program approved at the 2003 World Congress in Copenhagen, Denmark, the chapter’s name was officially changed to Junior Chamber International – Basilan Inc., during the incumbency of the 55th president (2004), JCI Mem. Jaime J. A. Rivera. He was elected national vice president for Western Mindanao for 2006. He is the chapter’s first JCIP Academy and PRIME Graduate (Davao 2004), as well as Certified Local Trainer duly accredited by JCI University, his term has been characterized by a closer coordination with local government units, greater synergy with the business sector, and renewed ties with other Jaycee chapters. He likewise won the "Most Outstanding National Vice President Award of Recognition" at the 2006 JCI Philippines national convention held in Subic, Zambales in October 2006, and was appointed national chairman of the Voice of Philippine Democracy project, as well as national adviser of the Philippine Junior Jaycees, Inc. in 2007. The 56th president (2005) JCI Mem. Nuayme “Indah” M. Sangkula, hails from the prodigious Sangkula Clan of Sulu, and is also a teacher, the third Muslim president of the chapter. The flagship "Miss Isabela Earth Pageant" was held during this term, with the winner - Miss Bernadette Estrada (Tantoco) - carrying the Miss Western Mindanao - Earth title and reaching the semi-finals in the Miss Philippines-Earth 2005 in Manila. JCI Basilan Inc. likewise hosted the 1st Area Council Meeting of JCI Philippines Area 5 (Mindanao) at Lantaka Hotel, Zamboanga City.

The chapter’s 57th president (2006) JCI Mem. Rowell C. Acaylar, is a Registered Nurse and a former Police Officer. He is currently a Clinical Instructor at the Mindanao Autonomous College Foundation Inc. (MACFI) in Lamitan City. His term is highlighted by twin victories at the national convention Temyong Awards held in Subic, Zambales, where the chapter’s only two bids for “Most Outstanding JCI Week Celebration” and “Most Outstanding JCI Family” both won coveted “Recognitions”, a substantial feat considering the competition for said categories. It was also on this year that JCI Basilan Inc. voluntarily split into two, with the male members retaining the chapter’s name and seal, while lady JCI Members were assisted in forming the all-female JCI Basileña, officially recognized on April 8, 2006, during the 2nd national board meeting of JCI Philippines Inc., held in Bacolod City, Negros Occidental.

SIDEBAR: JCI Basileña was led by its charter president, JCI Mem. Carlissele Rodriguez-Navales, followed by JCI Mem. Bernadita F. Hontucan in 2007, and Rev. May Casiano-Casada, a female priest of the Episcopal Church in 2008 before falling into a hiatus. The all-female chapter has since been revived for 2014 by JCI Mem. Ma. Jennesa Santos-Tubongbanua, Isabela City Councilor.

Yet another example of inter-generational dynamics happening in the chapter is the election of Atty. Orheim T. Ferrer, son of 1992 PP Edgardo Ferrer, as the chapter’s 58th president (2007). He is followed by the 59th president. JCI Mem. James Abner S. Rodriguez, Isabela City councilor, school administrator and community organizer, with strong ties to the local military establishment.
