= 1959 Marikina local elections =

1959 Marikina mayoral election

1959 Marikina mayoral election
- November 10, 1959
Candidate	Osmundo de Guzman	Irineo M. Cruz	Gil Fernando
Party	PPP–GA	Nacionalista	Liberal
Running mate	Jose S. Andres	Enrique de la Paz	Serafin Paz
Popular vote	4,823	4,463	3,826
Percentage	28.22%	26.12%	22.39%
Candidate	Juan Chanyungco	Dominador P. Santos
Party	Nacionalista (ind.)	Liberal (ind.)
Running mate	Marcos Cruz	Isidro Reyes
Popular vote	2,272	1,704
Percentage	13.30%	9.97%
Mayor before election
Gil Fernando
Liberal
Elected mayor
Osmundo de Guzman
PPP–GA

A mayoral and vice mayoral election was held in Marikina on November 10, 1959, as part of the 1959 Philippine general election. Osmundo de Guzman of the Grand Alliance defeated incumbent Liberal mayor Gil Fernando, with his running mate Jose Andres being elected to the vice mayoralty.

== Background ==
Liberal mayor Gil Fernando was elected in the 1955 elections, during a midterm election that saw the Nacionalista Party dominate the Senate of the Philippines. He ran for reelection in 1959, with Serafin Paz forming the latter part of the Liberal ticket.

== Candidates ==
=== For mayor ===
- Juan Chanyungco (Independent-Nacionalista), former mayor
- Irineo Cruz (Nacionalista), principal of Roosevelt Memorial High School
- Osmundo de Guzman (GA), president of the Marikina Valley Rural Bank, former Manila Police District officer
- Gil Fernando (Liberal), incumbent mayor
- Dominador P. Santos (Independent-Liberal)

=== For vice mayor ===
- Jose Andres (GA)
- Marcos Cruz (Independent-Nacionalista)
- Enrique de la Paz (Nacionalista), former mayor
- Serafin Paz (Liberal)
- Isidro Reyes (Independent-Liberal)

== Results ==
=== For mayor ===
De Guzman was elected mayor, defeating the incumbent mayor, Fernando, who saw his vote share decline to third place.

1959 Marikina mayoral election
Candidate	Party	Votes	%
Osmundo de Guzman	Progressive Party / Grand Alliance	4,823	28.22
Irineo M. Cruz	Nacionalista Party	4,463	26.12
Gil Fernando	Liberal	3,826	22.39
Juan Chanyungco	Independent	2,272	13.30
Dominador P. Santos	Independent	1,704	9.97
Total		17,088	100.00

=== For vice mayor ===
Andres was elected vice mayor, defeating Paz.

1959 Marikina vice mayoral election
Candidate	Party	Votes	%
Jose S. Andres	Progressive Party / Grand Alliance	4,736	29.32
Enrique de la Paz	Nacionalista Party	4,343	26.89
Serafin Paz	Liberal	3,353	20.76
Marcos Cruz	Independent	3,062	18.96
Isidro Reyes	Independent	657	4.07
Total		16,151	100.00
