= Angelina Sandoval-Gutierrez =

Filipino judge (born 1938)

The Honorable Angelina Sandoval-Gutierrez
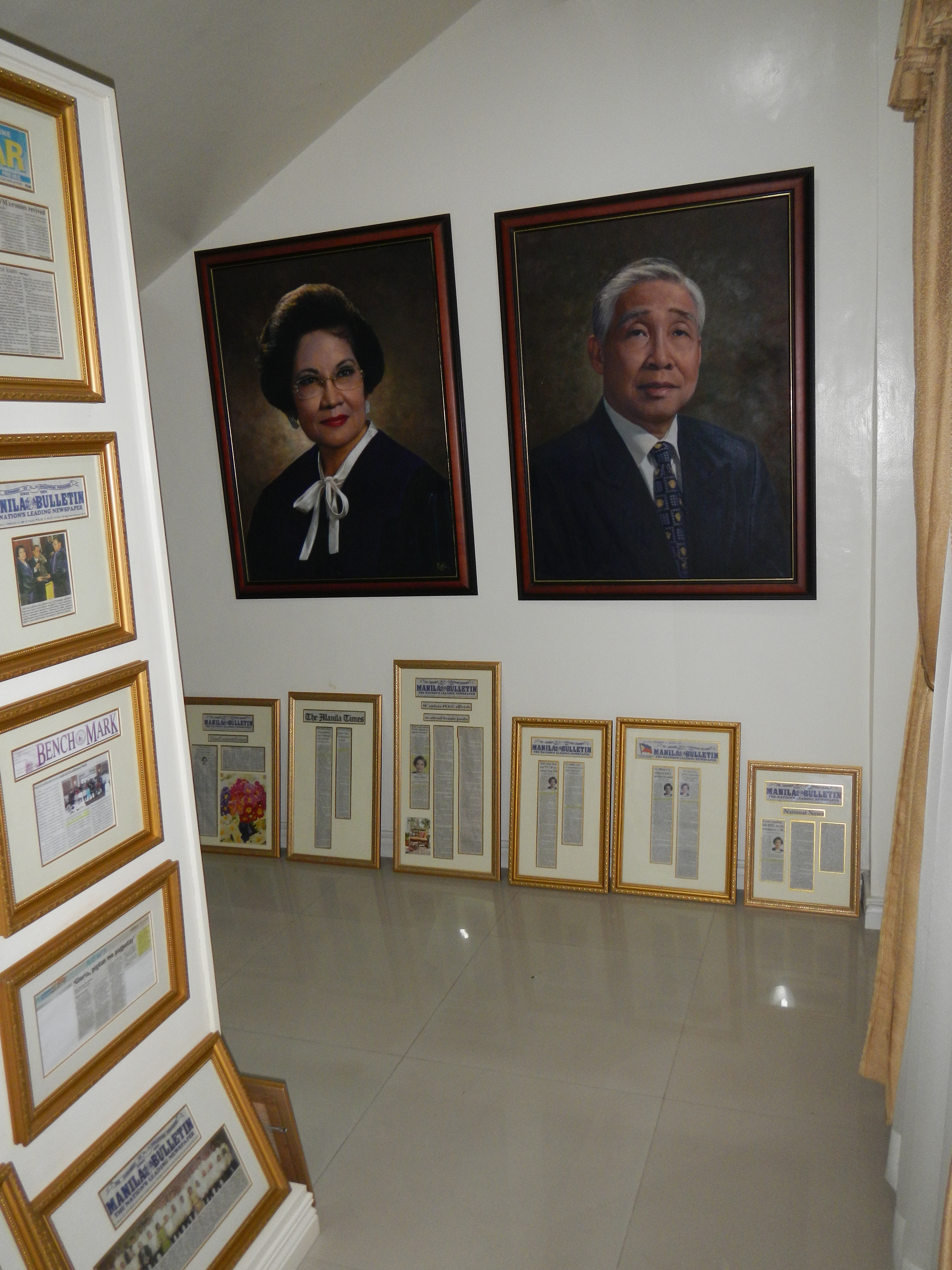
- Angelina Sandoval-Gutierrez Ancestral House, Museum and Memorabilia

147th Associate Justice of the Supreme Court of the Philippines
- In office December 22, 2000 – February 27, 2008
- Appointed by: Joseph Estrada
- Preceded by: Fidel Purisima
- Succeeded by: Arturo Brion

Member of the Judicial and Bar Council for retired Supreme Court justices
- In office October 8, 2014 – July 9, 2017
- Appointed by: Benigno Aquino III
- Preceded by: Regino C. Hermosisima Jr.
- Succeeded by: Jose C. Mendoza

Personal details
- Born: February 28, 1938 (age 88) Alitagtag, Batangas, Commonwealth of the Philippines
- Spouse: Diego H. Gutierrez (deceased)
- Education: St. Bridget College (UG Cert); University of Santo Tomas (LLB)

Angelina Sandoval-Gutierrez (born February 28, 1938) is a Filipino jurist from Alitagtag who served as an associate justice of the Supreme Court of the Philippines from 2000 to 2008. She was the last appointment to the Court made by President Joseph Estrada.

== Profile ==
Sandoval-Gutierrez graduated at Alitagtag Elementary School as salutatorian. On May 5, 1989, she received a "Special Award" as "Outstanding Citizen of Alitagtag." At St. Bridget College she finishing her Music Teacher’s Course in piano. On May 1, 1992, she became its "Most Outstanding Alumna." On March 7, 2003, Batangas conferred upon her the "Dangal ng Batangan Award".

Sandoval-Gutierrez earned her law degree from the University of Santo Tomas in 1960. She engaged in private practice of law for 2 years. After two years (1963 to 1965) working as legal aide II at the National Bureau of Investigation, Sandoval-Gutierrez joined the Department of Justice as legal researcher from 1965 to 1968, and judicial supervisor from 1968 to 1973.

She worked as a judicial assistant and attorney of the Supreme Court from 1973 to 1983.

In 1983, Sandoval-Gutierrez was appointed Branch 19, Manila Metropolitan Trial Court of Manila Judge before taking over Regional Trial Court Branch 37 in 1986.

She was promoted as an associate justice of the Court of Appeals by President Corazon Aquino in 1991. She served as chair of the Court of Appeals 8th division until her appointment to the Supreme Court in 2000.

In pursuit of post-graduate studies attended Harvard Law School Courses in 1989 and 1994, taking up Constitutional Law, Advanced Constitutional Law, Legal Medicine, Family Law and Federal Courts. She also studied, as a fellow, American and International Law at the Academy of the American and International Law, University of Texas in Dallas. She attended the course on trial techniques at the National Judicial College, University of Nevada at Reno and took up management and delinquency control at the University of Southern California Delinquency Control Institute, Los Angeles.

Among many various honors, Sandoval-Gutierrez was the first recipient of the prestigious Cayetano Arellano Award as an Outstanding RTC Judge of the Philippines for 1990. She has also the distinction of being the first winner (First Prize Awardee, 1989) in the judicial essay/best written decision contest among Regional Trial Court women judges sponsored by the Philippine Women Judges Association yearly for having written the best "Proposed Innovations in Judicial Management and Procedure".

From 2007 up to present, Sandoval-Gutierrez served as the dean of the Graduate School of Law of the Pamantasan ng Lungsod ng Maynila.

In 2014, she was appointed Judicial and Bar Council member replacing Regino C. Hermosisima Jr.

October 18, 2020, Sandoval-Gutierrez was appointed Judicial Integrity Board's vice chair, with a 2-year term. After the demise of Romeo Callejo Sr., she headed the judicial body as acting chair.

== Family ==
Sandoval-Gutierrez was married to the late National Bureau of Investigation Assistant Director Diego H. Gutierrez, who died in 2002. They have three children: Aileen Marie is the city prosecutor of Muntinlupa whose husband, Robert Victor C. Marcon, is the presiding judge of the Regional Trial Court, Branch 54, Lucena City; Francis Joseph, an esquire (attorney-at-law), is a graduate of American University Washington College of Law. He works in the Federal Communications Commission, Washington, D.C.; James Gerard, also an esquire, is a graduate of Boston University School of Law who lives and practices in New York City.

On May 14, 2000, Sandoval-Gutierrez was bestowed the “Ulirang Ina Award” by the National Mother's Day and Father's Day Foundation.

Sandoval-Gutierrez' heritage and landmark Angelina Sandoval-Gutierrez Ancestral House, Museum and Memorabilia is located at her home town of Barangay Concepcion, Alitagtag, Batangas.

== Some notable opinions ==
- Estrada v. Desierto (2001) - Separate Opinion — on the validity of assumption to the presidency of Gloria Macapagal Arroyo
- Long v. Basa (2001) — on availability of judicial remedies following expulsion of board members in a religious corporation
- Prov. of Camarines Sur v. Prov. of Quezon (2001) — on boundary dispute between Camarines Sur and Quezon
- Chavez v. Romulo (2004) — on the right to bear arms in the Philippines
- Batangas CATV v. Court of Appeals (2004) — on right of municipal governments to regulate cable TV subscription rates
- MTRCB v. ABS-CBN (2005) — on whether a public affairs television program may be subjected to prior review by the government television review board
- Republic v. Lim (2005) — on enforcement of just compensation in eminent domain
- David v. Ermita (2006) - on constitutionality of declaration of February 2006 declaration of state of emergency
- Sabio v. Gordon (2006) — on immunity of PCGG officials from attendance in congressional hearings

Legal offices
Preceded by Fidel Purisima	Associate Justice of the Supreme Court of the Philippines; 2000–2008	Succeeded by Arturo Brion
