= Abdulwahid Bidin =

The Honorable Abdulwahid Bidin

117th Associate Justice of the Supreme Court of the Philippines
- In office January 12, 1987 – April 7, 1995
- Nominated by: Corazon Aquino
- Preceded by: Lino Patajo
- Succeeded by: Regino C. Hermosisima, Jr.

Personal details
- Born: April 7, 1925 Sitangkai, Sulu, Philippine Islands
- Died: February 2, 1999 (aged 73) Manila, Philippines
- Party: PPP (GA; 1950s)
- Education: University of the Philippines

Abdulwahid A. Bidin (April 7, 1925 – February 2, 1999) was a Filipino lawyer who served as Associate Justice of the Supreme Court of the Philippines. Appointed by President Corazon Aquino in 1987, he was the first Filipino Muslim named to the country's Supreme Court.

== Early life ==
Born in Tawi-Tawi, Bidin finished his elementary education in Tawi-Tawi and his high school education in Sulu. He fought with the resistance movement against the Japanese Occupation during World War II, and after attended the University of the Philippines as a government scholar, and eventually earned his law degree from the university's College of Law.

Bidin returned to Sulu and spent the next few years in private practice. From 1956 to 1959, he was an elected member of the Sulu Provincial Board as member of the Grand Alliance.

== Judicial career ==
Bidin first entered the judiciary in 1968, when he was appointed trial judge in Zamboanga City. He was cited by the Integrated Bar of the Philippines as the Most Outstanding Trial Court Judge for 1979.

In 1983, Bidin was appointed to the Intermediate Appellate Court (now known as the Court of Appeals). He was an Associate Justice there until he was elevated to the Supreme Court on 12 January 1987. Bidin served in the Supreme Court for eight years until he reached the mandatory retirement age of 70 in April 1995.

== Death ==
Bidin died four years after his retirement from the Court on 2 February 1999 at age 73.

Legal offices
Preceded by Lino Patajo	Associate Justice of the Supreme Court of the Philippines; 1987–1995	Succeeded by Regino Hermosisima, Jr.
