= Judicial and Bar Council =

Body that recommends appointees for the judiciary in the Philippines

- Sangguniang Panghukuman at Pang-abogasya
- JBC seal
- Abbreviation: JBC
- Purpose: Recommending appointees to the Judiciary
- Location: Padre Faura Street, Ermita, Manila
- Members: 7: Presidential appointment upon approval of the Commission on Appointments (regular members and Secretary of Justice); Presidential appointment from nominees of the Judicial and Bar Council (Chief Justice); Nomination by each house of Congress (Member from Congress)
- Chairperson: Rodil Zalameda
- Clerk of Supreme Court En Banc and Ex Officio Secretary: Atty. Marife Lomibao-Cuveas
- Parent organization: Supreme Court
- Website: jbc.judiciary.gov.ph

The Judicial and Bar Council (JBC; Filipino: Sangguniang Panghukuman at Pang-abogasya) of the Philippines is a constitutionally-created body that recommends appointees for vacancies that may arise in the composition of the Supreme Court, other lower courts, and the Legal Education Board, and in the offices of the ombudsman, deputy ombudsman and the special prosecutor.

== History ==
The Supreme Court and other lower courts in the Philippines were established upon the basis of Act No .136 of 1901 of the Philippine Commission. This succeeded the Real Audiencas and lower courts during the Spanish era. At this time, the Supreme Court was appointed by the Philippine Commission. With the approval of the Jones Law in 1916, the justices of the Supreme Court were appointed by the president of the United States, with advice and consent of the United States Senate. Judges of lower courts were then appointed by the governor-general.

Upon the ratification of the 1935 constitution, all justices and judges are appointed by the president of the Philippines with consent of the 21-member Commission on Appointments of the National Assembly of the Philippines. Upon the reestablishment of bicameralism, the Commission on Appointments then had equal number of members (12) from the House of Representatives and Senate. This became the setup until the approval of the 1973 constitution, where the president had the sole power of appointment, with no check and balance from the Batasang Pambansa. With the approval of the 1987 constitution, the Judicial and Bar Council was created to provide a shortlist of nominees on which the president can appoint from.

== Composition ==
The Council is composed of a representative of the Integrated Bar, a professor of law, a retired member of the Supreme Court, and a representative of the private sector. They are the "regular" members, as opposed to the secretary of justice and a representative of Congress who are the ex officio members. The chief justice of the Supreme Court is the ex officio chairman, while the clerk of the Supreme Court shall serve as the ex officio secretary.

The regular members would be nominated by the president with the consent of the Commission on Appointments for a term of four years. However, since the terms will be staggered, the first set of members would a different lengths of service: the representative of the Integrated Bar shall serve for four years, the professor of law for three years, the retired justice for two years, and the representative of the private sector for one year. The succeeding members shall then be given the full four-year term.

The chief justice is appointed by the president from the shortlist submitted by the JBC. The secretary of justice, as a member of the Cabinet, is appointed by the president with advice and consent of the Commission on Appointments. The member of Congress is elected by the chamber where the member came from.

The regular members were allowed to be reappointed without limit. The secretary of justice serves at the pleasure of the president, while the representative of Congress serves until they are recalled by their chamber, or until the term of Congress that named them expires. Finally, the chief justice serves until mandatory retirement at the age of 70. The regular members' terms start at July 9.

In 2012, a petition at the Supreme Court questioned on who should occupy the seat allocated for Congress. By then, there are two members of Congress in the council, with both having voting rights: the chairman of the House of Representatives Committee on Justice and the chairman of the Senate Committee on Justice and Human Rights. The Supreme Court ruled in 2013 that there should only be one member of the JBC from Congress; the court left to Congress whom among the two would be its representative to the JBC.

The council is the only government body that has members from all three branches of the government, excluding ad hoc and advisory bodies.

== Function ==
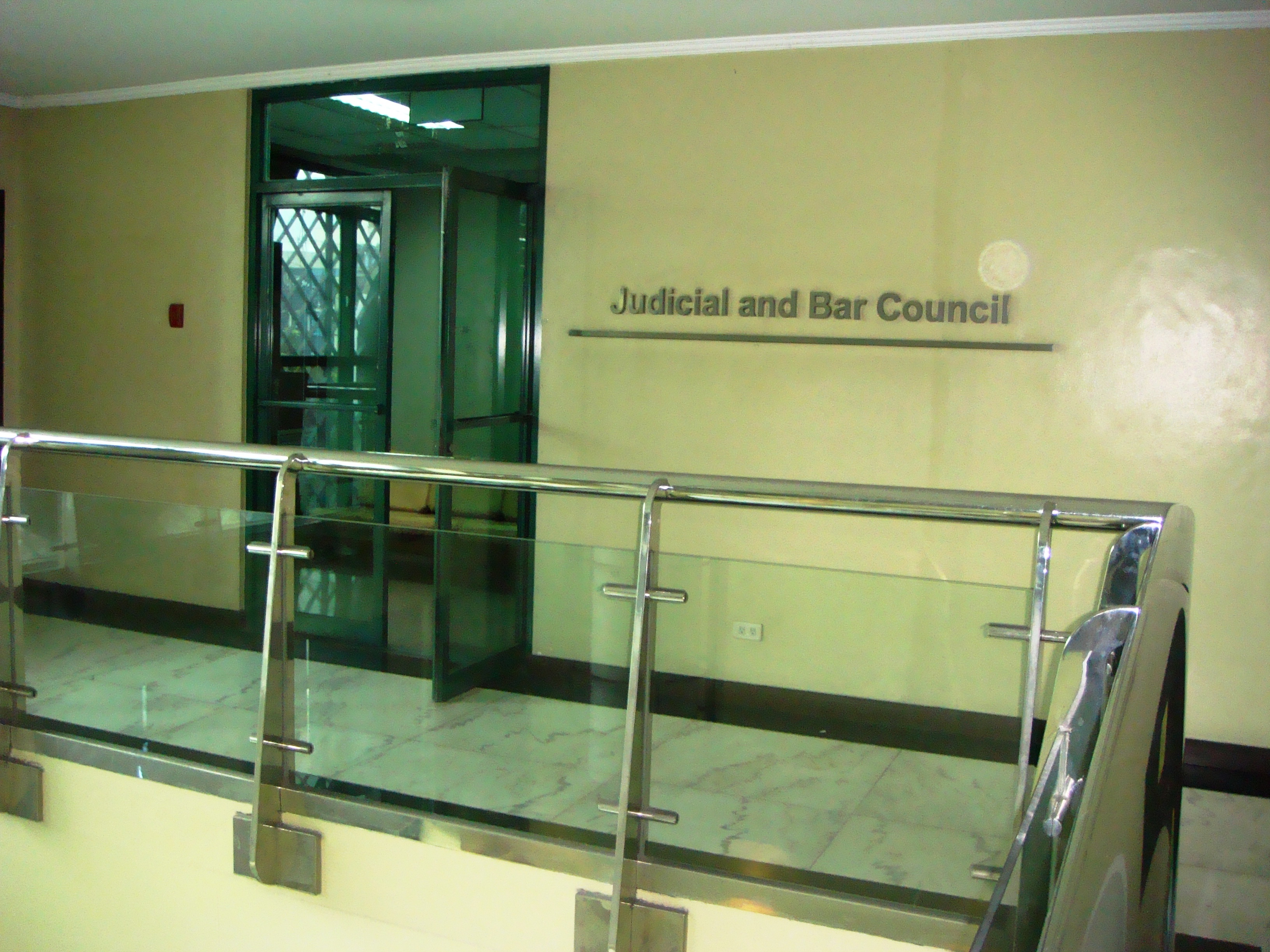
Entrance to the JBC offices

The function of the Council is to recommend to the representatives of possible appointees to the judiciary.

The president shall choose from among those nominated, before the president may ask the Council to nominate somebody else and add it to the list, but this is not allowed anymore. In 2009, President Gloria Macapagal Arroyo asked the council to add more nominees on two Supreme Court vacancies. The council rejected the request. Arroyo then appointed someone from the list.

The person then chosen by the president then becomes a member of the Judiciary, and is not anymore reviewed by the Commission on Appointments. This is to prevent politicking and horse-trading among political parties.

Former Chief Justice Artemio Panganiban said that the Council's principal objective is to attract the best and brightest to the judiciary and to make them remain there.

=== Offices shortlisted ===
- Justices of the Supreme Court
- Justices of the Court of Appeals
- Justices of the Sandiganbayan
- Justices of the Court of Tax Appeals
- Officials in the Office of the Ombudsman
- Members of the Legal Education Board
- Judges in the Regional Trial Courts and all lower courts

== Membership ==
The members of the Judicial and Bar Council are:

| Member | | Term started | Term scheduled to end | Membership | | Type | Appointed by |
|---|---|---|---|---|---|---|---|
| 1 | Rodil Zalameda | Nov 6, 2026 | Aug 2, 2033 | Chief Justice | | Ex officio chairman | Bongbong Marcos |
| 2 | Fredderick Vida | Oct 9, 2025 | Serves at president's pleasure | Secretary of Justice | | Ex officio member | Bongbong Marcos |
| 3 | Kiko Pangilinan (Note: Under the current arrangement, the congressman sits from January to June, while the senator sits from July to December. Only one representative is to sit at any time.) | Jun 17, 2026 | Jun 30, 2028 | Member representing Congress | Senate | Ex officio member | 20th Congress |
| 3 | Gerville Luistro | Jul 30, 2025 | Jun 30, 2028 | Member representing Congress | House of Representatives | Ex officio member | 20th Congress |
| 4 | Erlinda Piñera-Uy | Jul 21, 2023 | Jul 9, 2027 | Member representing the Integrated Bar | | Regular member | Bongbong Marcos |
| 5 | Nesauro Firme | Jul 9, 2026 | Jul 9, 2030 | Member representing the academe | | Regular member | Bongbong Marcos |
| 6 | Jose C. Mendoza | Jul 25, 2025 | Jul 9, 2029 | Member representing the retired justices of the Supreme Court | | Regular member | Bongbong Marcos |
| 7 | Jose V. Mejia | Jul 19, 2024 | Jul 9, 2028 | Member representing the private sector | | Regular member | Bongbong Marcos |

- JBC Consultant: Ma. Theresa Dolores Gomez-Estoesta, as Supreme Court Administrator

As a matter of tradition, the two most senior associate justices of the Supreme Court also take part in the JBC deliberations, but do not vote:

- Marvic Leonen (Senior Associate Justice)
- Alfredo Benjamin Caguioa (Associate Justice)

=== Former members ===
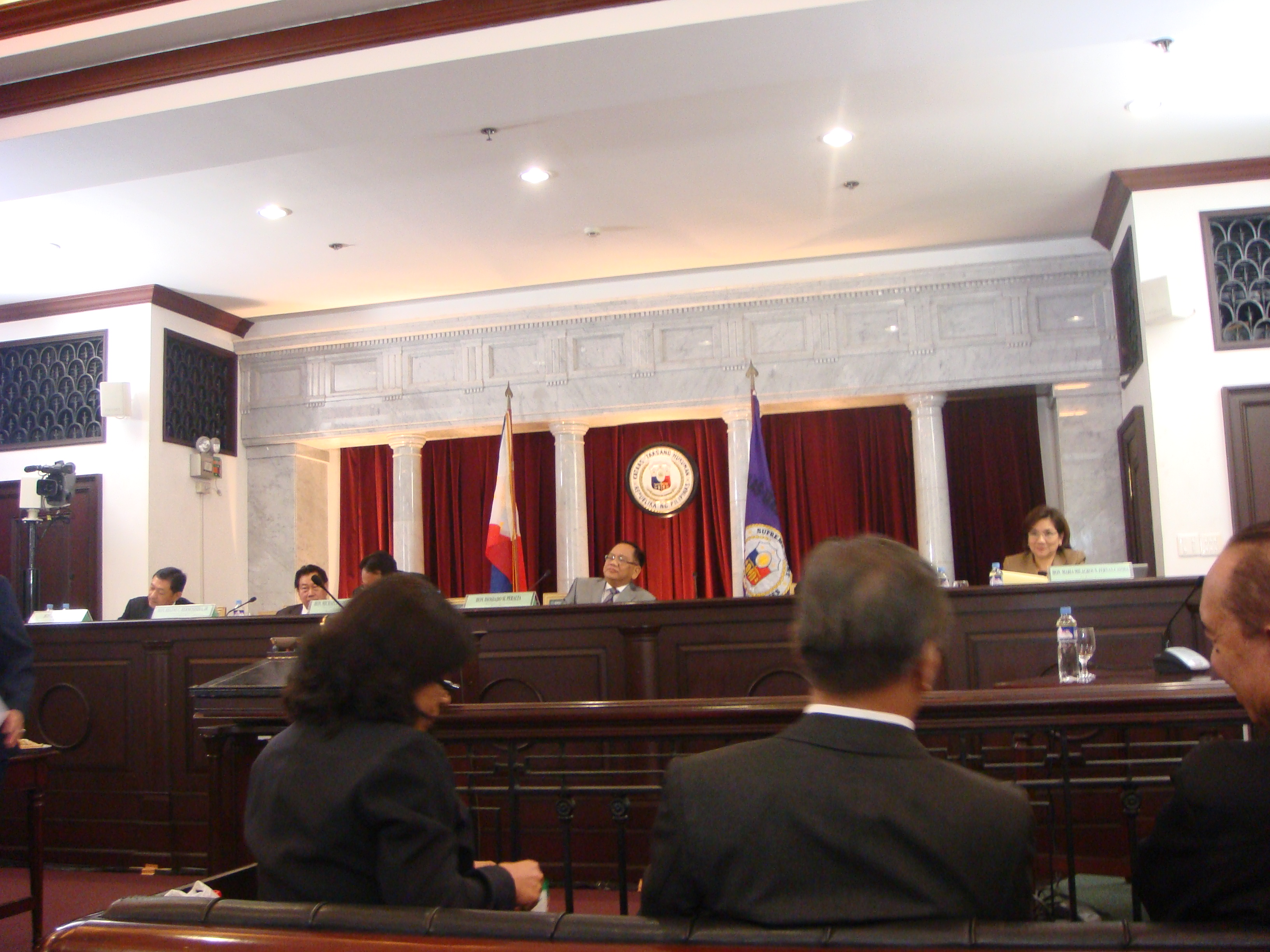
The JBC members in the Chief Justice of the Supreme Court of the Philippines Panel Interview

The members of the JBC were:

==== Chief Justice ====
The Chief Justice became a member starting on December 10, 1987.

==== Secretaries of Justice ====
The Secretary of Justice became a member starting on December 10, 1987.

==== Representatives from Congress ====
Congress is a bicameral legislature. The representative from Congress is either Chairman of the Senate Committee on Justice and Human Rights, or the House Committee on Justice.

===== One representative =====
Since the creation of the JBC in 1987 until 1994, the representation for Congress in the body alternated between the House of Representatives and the Senate. By 1993, the two representatives from Congress began sitting simultaneously, each having one-half of a vote. On May 30, 2001, the JBC en banc decided to grant the representatives from both Houses of Congress one full vote each.

In 2013, the eight-member composition of the JBC was questioned at the Supreme Court. The Supreme Court restored the composition of the JBC to seven. It was arranged that the representative of the House of Representatives sits from January to June, while the representative of the Senate sits from July to December.

| Term started | Senator | Representative | Congress |
|---|---|---|---|
| December 10, 1987 | Wigberto Tañada March 2, 1988 – May 21, 1990 | Rogaciano Mercado December 10, 1987 – February 23, 1989 Isidro Zarraga July 31, 1989 – June 30, 1992 | 8th |
| June 30, 1992 | Raul Roco September 30, 1992 – March 3, 1993 Alberto Romulo April 14, 1993 – June 30, 1995 | Isidro Zarraga June 30, 1992– August 12, 1992 Pablo P. Garcia August 26, 1992 – March 8, 1995 Isidro Zarraga June 28–30, 1995 | 9th |
| June 30, 1995 | Alberto Romulo June 30, 1995– August 1, 1995 Marcelo Fernan August 2, 1995 – December 31, 1996 Raul Roco January 1. 1997 – June 30, 1998 | Isidro Zarraga June 30, 1995 – June 30, 1998 | 10th |
| June 30, 1998 | Raul Roco June 30 – July 30, 1998 Rene Cayetano July 31, 1998 – January 31, 2000 Nene Pimentel February 1 – November 29, 2000 Miriam Defensor Santiago January 10 – February 14, 2001 Rene Cayetano May 16 – June 30, 2001 | Alfredo Abueg July 31, 1998 – November 29, 2000 Henry Lanot December 14, 2000 – June 30, 2001 | 11th |
| June 30, 2001 | Rene Cayetano June 30 – August 28, 2001 Kiko Pangilinan August 29, 2001 – June 30, 2004 | Alan Peter Cayetano August 8, 2001 – March 3, 2003 Marcelino Libanan March 4 – August 8, 2003 | 12th |
| June 30, 2004 | Kiko Pangilinan June 30, 2004 – June 30, 2007 | Simeon Datumanong August 9, 2004 – June 30, 2007 | 13th |
| June 30, 2007 | Kiko Pangilinan June 30, 2007 – November 23, 2008 Francis Escudero November 24, 2008 – June 30, 2010 | Matias Defensor Jr. August 8, 2007 – June 30, 2010 | 14th |
| June 30, 2010 | Francis Escudero June 30, 2010 – June 30, 2013 | Niel Tupas Jr. July 29, 2010 – June 30, 2013 | 15th |
| June 30, 2013 | Koko Pimentel July 23 – December 31, 2013 July 1 – December 31, 2014 July 1 – December 31, 2015 | Niel Tupas Jr. January 1 – June 30, 2014 January 1 – June 30, 2015 January 1 – June 30, 2016 | 16th |
| June 30, 2016 | Leila de Lima July 26 – September 19, 2016 Dick Gordon September 29 – December 31, 2016 July 1 – December 31, 2017 July 1 – December 31, 2018 | Reynaldo Umali January 1 – June 30, 2017 January 1 – June 30, 2018 Paulino Salvador Leachon January 1 – June 30, 2019 | 17th |
| June 30, 2019 | Dick Gordon July 22 – December 31, 2019 July 1 – December 31, 2020 July 1 – December 31, 2021 | Vicente Veloso III January 1 – June 30, 2020 January 1 – June 30, 2021 January 1 – June 30, 2022 | 18th |
| June 30, 2022 | Francis Tolentino July 25 – December 31, 2022 July 1 – December 31, 2023 July 1 – August 15, 2024 Koko Pimentel August 19 – December 31, 2024 | Juliet Marie Ferrer January 1 – June 30, 2023 January 1 – June 30, 2024 January 1 – June 30, 2025 | 19th |
| June 30, 2025 | Alan Peter Cayetano July 29, 2025 – September 10, 2025 Kiko Pangilinan September 10 – December 31, 2025 July 1, 2026 – present | Gerville Luistro January 1 – June 30, 2026 | 20th |

==== Regular members ====
| Term started | Representative from the Integrated Bar | Representative from the academe | Retired Supreme Court justice | Representative from the private sector | Appointed by |
|---|---|---|---|---|---|
| December 10, 1987 | Leon Garcia Jr. June 17, 1988 – July 9, 1991 | Rodolfo Palma December 10, 1987 – July 9, 1990 | Nestor Alampay December 10, 1987 – December 10, 1989 | Ofelia Santos December 10, 1987 – December 10, 1988 | Corazon Aquino February 25, 1986 – June 30,. 1992 |
| December 10, 1988 | Leon Garcia Jr. June 17, 1988 – July 9, 1991 | Rodolfo Palma December 10, 1987 – July 9, 1990 | Nestor Alampay December 10, 1987 – December 10, 1989 | Ofelia Santos December 10, 1988 – July 9, 1992 | Corazon Aquino February 25, 1986 – June 30,. 1992 |
| December 10, 1989 | Leon Garcia Jr. June 17, 1988 – July 9, 1991 | Rodolfo Palma December 10, 1987 – July 9, 1990 | Lorenzo Relova January 8, 1990 – July 9. 1993 | Ofelia Santos December 10, 1988 – July 9, 1992 | Corazon Aquino February 25, 1986 – June 30,. 1992 |
| July 9, 1990 | Leon Garcia Jr. June 17, 1988 – July 9, 1991 | Rodolfo Palma July 9, 1990 – July 9, 1994 | Lorenzo Relova January 8, 1990 – July 9. 1993 | Ofelia Santos December 10, 1988 – July 9, 1992 | Corazon Aquino February 25, 1986 – June 30,. 1992 |
| July 9, 1991 | Presbitero Velasco Jr. January 7, 1993 – March 22, 1995^{a} | Rodolfo Palma July 9, 1990 – July 9, 1994 | Lorenzo Relova January 8, 1990 – July 9. 1993 | Ofelia Santos December 10, 1988 – July 9, 1992 | Corazon Aquino February 25, 1986 – June 30,. 1992 |
| July 9, 1992 | Presbitero Velasco Jr. January 7, 1993 – March 22, 1995^{a} | Rodolfo Palma July 9, 1990 – July 9, 1994 | Lorenzo Relova January 8, 1990 – July 9. 1993 | Teresita Cruz Sison September 30, 1992– July 9, 1996 | Fidel V. Ramos June 30, 1992 – June 30, 1998 |
| July 9, 1993 | Presbitero Velasco Jr. January 7, 1993 – March 22, 1995^{a} | Rodolfo Palma July 9, 1990 – July 9, 1994 | Jose C. Campos September 22, 1993 – July 9. 1997 | Teresita Cruz Sison September 30, 1992– July 9, 1996 | Fidel V. Ramos June 30, 1992 – June 30, 1998 |
| July 9, 1994 | Presbitero Velasco Jr. January 7, 1993 – March 22, 1995^{a} | Cezar Peralejo February 8, 1995 – July 9, 1998 | Jose C. Campos September 22, 1993 – July 9. 1997 | Teresita Cruz Sison September 30, 1992– July 9, 1996 | Fidel V. Ramos June 30, 1992 – June 30, 1998 |
| July 9, 1995 | Francisco Santiago August 1, 1995 – July 9, 1996 Amado Dimayuga July 8, 1997 – July 9, 1999 | Cezar Peralejo February 8, 1995 – July 9, 1998 | Jose C. Campos September 22, 1993 – July 9. 1997 | Teresita Cruz Sison September 30, 1992– July 9, 1996 | Fidel V. Ramos June 30, 1992 – June 30, 1998 |
| July 9, 1996 | Francisco Santiago August 1, 1995 – July 9, 1996 Amado Dimayuga July 8, 1997 – July 9, 1999 | Cezar Peralejo February 8, 1995 – July 9, 1998 | Jose C. Campos September 22, 1993 – July 9. 1997 | Teresita Cruz Sison July 9. 1997 – July 9, 2000 | Fidel V. Ramos June 30, 1992 – June 30, 1998 |
| July 9, 1997 | Francisco Santiago August 1, 1995 – July 9, 1996 Amado Dimayuga July 8, 1997 – July 9, 1999 | Cezar Peralejo February 8, 1995 – July 9, 1998 | Regino C. Hermosisima Jr. November 24, 1997 – July 9. 2001 | Teresita Cruz Sison July 9. 1997 – July 9, 2000 | Fidel V. Ramos June 30, 1992 – June 30, 1998 |
| July 9, 1998 | Francisco Santiago August 1, 1995 – July 9, 1996 Amado Dimayuga July 8, 1997 – July 9, 1999 | Alfredo Marigomen July 21, 1998 – July 9, 2002 | Regino C. Hermosisima Jr. November 24, 1997 – July 9. 2001 | Teresita Cruz Sison July 9. 1997 – July 9, 2000 | Joseph Estrada June 30, 1998 – January 20, 2001 |
| July 9, 1999 | Amado Dimayuga July 9, 1999 – July 9, 2003 | Alfredo Marigomen July 21, 1998 – July 9, 2002 | Regino C. Hermosisima Jr. November 24, 1997 – July 9. 2001 | Teresita Cruz Sison July 9. 1997 – July 9, 2000 | Joseph Estrada June 30, 1998 – January 20, 2001 |
| July 9, 2000 | Amado Dimayuga July 9, 1999 – July 9, 2003 | Alfredo Marigomen July 21, 1998 – July 9, 2002 | Regino C. Hermosisima Jr. November 24, 1997 – July 9. 2001 | Teresita Cruz Sison August 18, 2000 – July 9, 2004 | Joseph Estrada June 30, 1998 – January 20, 2001 |
| July 9, 2001 | Amado Dimayuga July 9, 1999 – July 9, 2003 | Alfredo Marigomen July 21, 1998 – July 9, 2002 | Regino C. Hermosisima Jr. September 10, 2001 – July 9, 2005 | Teresita Cruz Sison August 18, 2000 – July 9, 2004 | Gloria Macapagal Arroyo January 20, 2001 – June 30, 2010 |
| July 9, 2002 | Amado Dimayuga July 9, 1999 – July 9, 2003 | Amado Dimayuga July 9, 2003 – July 9, 2006 | Regino C. Hermosisima Jr. September 10, 2001 – July 9, 2005 | Teresita Cruz Sison August 18, 2000 – July 9, 2004 | Gloria Macapagal Arroyo January 20, 2001 – June 30, 2010 |
| July 9, 2003 | Conrado Castro July 9, 2003 – July 9, 2007 | Amado Dimayuga July 9, 2003 – July 9, 2006 | Regino C. Hermosisima Jr. September 10, 2001 – July 9, 2005 | Teresita Cruz Sison August 18, 2000 – July 9, 2004 | Gloria Macapagal Arroyo January 20, 2001 – June 30, 2010 |
| July 9, 2004 | Conrado Castro July 9, 2003 – July 9, 2007 | Amado Dimayuga July 9, 2003 – July 9, 2006 | Regino C. Hermosisima Jr. September 10, 2001 – July 9, 2005 | Raoul Victorino July 12, 2005 – July 9, 2008 | Gloria Macapagal Arroyo January 20, 2001 – June 30, 2010 |
| July 9, 2005 | Conrado Castro July 9, 2003 – July 9, 2007 | Amado Dimayuga July 9, 2003 – July 9, 2006 | Regino C. Hermosisima Jr. October 4, 2005 – July 9. 2009 | Raoul Victorino July 12, 2005 – July 9, 2008 | Gloria Macapagal Arroyo January 20, 2001 – June 30, 2010 |
| July 9, 2006 | Conrado Castro July 9, 2003 – July 9, 2007 | Amado Dimayuga July 9, 2006 – July 9, 2010 | Regino C. Hermosisima Jr. October 4, 2005 – July 9. 2009 | Raoul Victorino July 12, 2005 – July 9, 2008 | Gloria Macapagal Arroyo January 20, 2001 – June 30, 2010 |
| July 9, 2007 | Conrado Castro July 9, 2007 – March 17, 2011^{b} Maria Milagros Fernan-Cayosa May 2 – July 9, 2011 | Amado Dimayuga July 9, 2006 – July 9, 2010 | Regino C. Hermosisima Jr. October 4, 2005 – July 9. 2009 | Raoul Victorino July 12, 2005 – July 9, 2008 | Gloria Macapagal Arroyo January 20, 2001 – June 30, 2010 |
| July 9, 2008 | Conrado Castro July 9, 2007 – March 17, 2011^{b} Maria Milagros Fernan-Cayosa May 2 – July 9, 2011 | Amado Dimayuga July 9, 2006 – July 9, 2010 | Regino C. Hermosisima Jr. October 4, 2005 – July 9. 2009 | Aurora Santiago Lagman October 13, 2008 – July 9, 2012 | Gloria Macapagal Arroyo January 20, 2001 – June 30, 2010 |
| July 9, 2009 | Conrado Castro July 9, 2007 – March 17, 2011^{b} Maria Milagros Fernan-Cayosa May 2 – July 9, 2011 | Amado Dimayuga July 9, 2006 – July 9, 2010 | Regino C. Hermosisima Jr. July 9, 2009 – July 9. 2013 | Aurora Santiago Lagman October 13, 2008 – July 9, 2012 | Gloria Macapagal Arroyo January 20, 2001 – June 30, 2010 |
| July 9, 2010 | Conrado Castro July 9, 2007 – March 17, 2011^{b} Maria Milagros Fernan-Cayosa May 2 – July 9, 2011 | Jose Mejia April 28, 2011 – July 9, 2014 | Regino C. Hermosisima Jr. July 9, 2009 – July 9. 2013 | Aurora Santiago Lagman October 13, 2008 – July 9, 2012 | Benigno Aquino III June 30, 2010 – June 30, 2016 |
| July 9, 2011 | Maria Milagros Fernan-Cayosa July 9, 2011 – July 9, 2015 | Jose Mejia April 28, 2011 – July 9, 2014 | Regino C. Hermosisima Jr. July 9, 2009 – July 9. 2013 | Aurora Santiago Lagman October 13, 2008 – July 9, 2012 | Benigno Aquino III June 30, 2010 – June 30, 2016 |
| July 9, 2012 | Maria Milagros Fernan-Cayosa July 9, 2011 – July 9, 2015 | Jose Mejia April 28, 2011 – July 9, 2014 | Regino C. Hermosisima Jr. July 9, 2009 – July 9. 2013 | Aurora Santiago Lagman July 9, 2012 – July 9, 2016 | Benigno Aquino III June 30, 2010 – June 30, 2016 |
| July 9, 2013 | Maria Milagros Fernan-Cayosa July 9, 2011 – July 9, 2015 | Jose Mejia April 28, 2011 – July 9, 2014 | Angelina Sandoval-Gutierrez October 8, 2014 – July 9. 2017 | Aurora Santiago Lagman July 9, 2012 – July 9, 2016 | Benigno Aquino III June 30, 2010 – June 30, 2016 |
| July 9, 2014 | Maria Milagros Fernan-Cayosa July 9, 2011 – July 9, 2015 | Jose Mejia July 9, 2014 – July 9, 2018 | Angelina Sandoval-Gutierrez October 8, 2014 – July 9. 2017 | Aurora Santiago Lagman July 9, 2012 – July 9, 2016 | Benigno Aquino III June 30, 2010 – June 30, 2016 |
| July 9, 2015 | Maria Milagros Fernan-Cayosa July 9, 2015 – July 9, 2019 | Jose Mejia July 9, 2014 – July 9, 2018 | Angelina Sandoval-Gutierrez October 8, 2014 – July 9. 2017 | Aurora Santiago Lagman July 9, 2012 – July 9, 2016 | Benigno Aquino III June 30, 2010 – June 30, 2016 |
| July 9, 2016 | Maria Milagros Fernan-Cayosa July 9, 2015 – July 9, 2019 | Jose Mejia July 9, 2014 – July 9, 2018 | Angelina Sandoval-Gutierrez October 8, 2014 – July 9. 2017 | Toribio Ilao Jr. October 24, 2016 – July 9, 2020 | Rodrigo Duterte June 30, 2016 – June 30, 2022 |
| July 9, 2017 | Maria Milagros Fernan-Cayosa July 9, 2015 – July 9, 2019 | Jose Mejia July 9, 2014 – July 9, 2018 | Jose C. Mendoza October 4, 2017 – July 9. 2021 | Toribio Ilao Jr. October 24, 2016 – July 9, 2020 | Rodrigo Duterte June 30, 2016 – June 30, 2022 |
| July 9, 2018 | Maria Milagros Fernan-Cayosa July 9, 2015 – July 9, 2019 | Noel Tijam March 6, 2019 – July 9, 2022 | Jose C. Mendoza October 4, 2017 – July 9. 2021 | Toribio Ilao Jr. October 24, 2016 – July 9, 2020 | Rodrigo Duterte June 30, 2016 – June 30, 2022 |
| July 9, 2019 | Franklin Demonteverde July 9, 2019 – July 9, 2023 | Noel Tijam March 6, 2019 – July 9, 2022 | Jose C. Mendoza October 4, 2017 – July 9. 2021 | Toribio Ilao Jr. October 24, 2016 – July 9, 2020 | Rodrigo Duterte June 30, 2016 – June 30, 2022 |
| July 9, 2020 | Franklin Demonteverde July 9, 2019 – July 9, 2023 | Noel Tijam March 6, 2019 – July 9, 2022 | Jose C. Mendoza October 4, 2017 – July 9. 2021 | Toribio Ilao Jr. July 9, 2020 – July 9, 2024 | Rodrigo Duterte June 30, 2016 – June 30, 2022 |
| July 9, 2021 | Franklin Demonteverde July 9, 2019 – July 9, 2023 | Noel Tijam March 6, 2019 – July 9, 2022 | Jose C. Mendoza July 20, 2021 – July 9, 2025 | Toribio Ilao Jr. July 9, 2020 – July 9, 2024 | Rodrigo Duterte June 30, 2016 – June 30, 2022 |
| July 9, 2022 | Franklin Demonteverde July 9, 2019 – July 9, 2023 | Nesauro Firme July 11, 2022 – July 9, 2026 | Jose C. Mendoza July 20, 2021 – July 9, 2025 | Toribio Ilao Jr. July 9, 2020 – July 9, 2024 | Bongbong Marcos June 30, 2022 – present |
| July 9, 2023 | Erlinda Piñera Uy July 21, 2023 – present (Term ends July 9, 2027) | Nesauro Firme July 11, 2022 – July 9, 2026 | Jose C. Mendoza July 20, 2021 – July 9, 2025 | Toribio Ilao Jr. July 9, 2020 – July 9, 2024 | Bongbong Marcos June 30, 2022 – present |
| July 9, 2024 | Erlinda Piñera Uy July 21, 2023 – present (Term ends July 9, 2027) | Nesauro Firme July 11, 2022 – July 9, 2026 | Jose C. Mendoza July 20, 2021 – July 9, 2025 | Jose Mejia July 20, 2024 – present (Term ends July 9, 2028) | Bongbong Marcos June 30, 2022 – present |
| July 9, 2025 | Erlinda Piñera Uy July 21, 2023 – present (Term ends July 9, 2027) | Nesauro Firme July 11, 2022 – July 9, 2026 | Jose C. Mendoza July 25, 2025 – present (Term ends July 9, 2029) | Jose Mejia July 20, 2024 – present (Term ends July 9, 2028) | Bongbong Marcos June 30, 2022 – present |
| July 9, 2026 | Erlinda Piñera Uy July 21, 2023 – present (Term ends July 9, 2027) | Nesauro Firme July 9, 2026 – present (Term ends July 9, 2030) | Jose C. Mendoza July 25, 2025 – present (Term ends July 9, 2029) | Jose Mejia July 20, 2024 – present (Term ends July 9, 2028) | Bongbong Marcos June 30, 2022 – present |

Notes:

a. Resigned
b. Died in office

== See also ==
- Judicial nominating commission
- Professional Regulation Commission
