= St. Bridget College =

Roman Catholic college in Batangas, Philippines

- Kolehiyo ng Santa Bridgeta (Filipino)
- Main Campus, Batangas City
- Former names: St. Bridget's Academy (1913–1946); St. Bridget's College (1946–2001)
- Motto: Luceat Lux Vestra (Latin)
- Motto in English: Let Your Light Shine
- Type: Private Sectarian
- Established: June 9, 1913
- Religious affiliation: Roman Catholic (Sisters of the Good Shepherd)
- Academic affiliations: PAASCU
- Chairperson: Sr. Mary Regina Kuizon, RGS
- President: Sr. Ma Añanita Borbon RGS Ph.D
- Principal: Bernadette Ibon-Manalo (BED)
- Dean: Dr. Amor L. Borbon
- Head: Sr. Mary Natividad Lucero, RGS
- Location: M.H. del Pilar St. Batangas City, Batangas, Philippines; 13°45′10.52″N 121°03′30.46″E
- Alma Mater song: SBC Hymn
- Publications: Beaconette (Grade School) Beacon (High School) "Ang Sulyap" (High School Filipino; Sibul (College)
- Colors: Royal blue & white
- Nickname: SBC Shepherds
- Sporting affiliations: BCPRISAA, USCAA, STCAA
- Mascot: Bulak the Sheep
- Website: sbcbatangas.edu.ph
- Location in Luzon Location in the Philippines

St. Bridget College is a Catholic education institution founded by the Religious of the Good Shepherd in 1913. At present, its main campus is located at M.H. del Pilar Street, Batangas City, Philippines. It is one of the major schools located in Batangas City and throughout the Province of Batangas. It is also the oldest Catholic School in the Archdiocese of Lipa and also the first school established by the Religious of the Good Shepherd in the Philippines.

== History ==
The Religious of the Good Shepherd or RGS established the first Catholic School for girls in the Diocese of Lipa. This was in 1913, when the Most Reverend Joseph Petrelli, Bishop of the Diocese, asked the help of the RGS Sisters working in Rangoon, Burma to come to Batangas to start the first educational mission of the Church in his Diocese. The challenge to undertake this new mission was taken up by Mother Mary of St. Ligouri and her companions. Within a short span of time, more Sisters from the Mother House in France arrived. There were difficulties in the beginning but the Irish and American Sisters who pioneered the task surmounted these. The sisters started the school with the name St. Bridget Academy.

For 34 years the educational program of Saint Bridget was confined to grade school and high school. In 1953 the boys' high school section was established. In 1980 the students of the Boys' and Girls' High School Departments were integrated into co-educational classes.

== Facilities ==
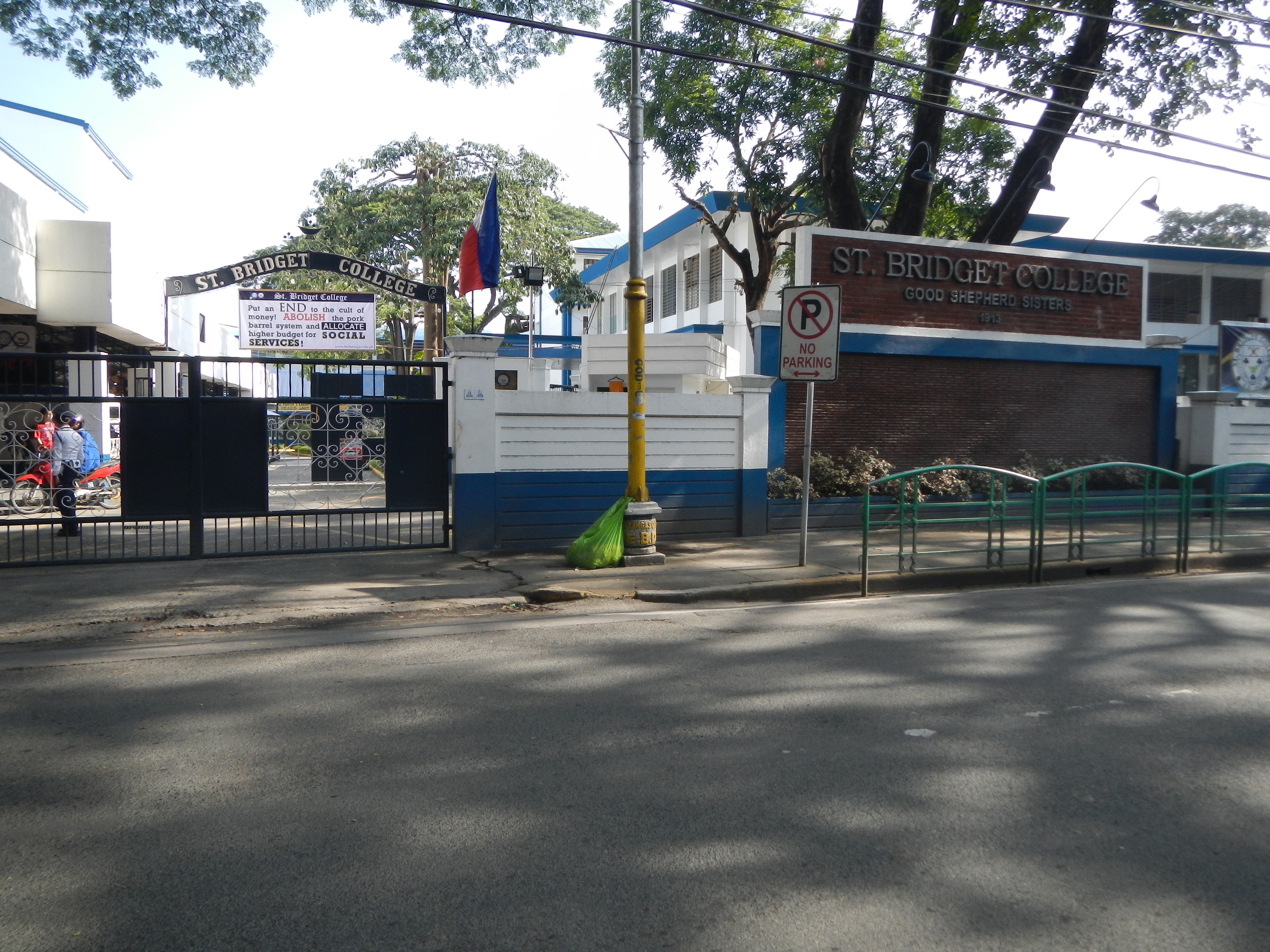
Entrance gate

Elementary Department

The Elementary Department is a three floor building which is divided into two buildings. Each classrooms of Grades 4-6 are provided with a built in projector and a mimio toolbar that enriches the education with technology of the school. All Grades 1-6 and Pre-Kinder and Kinder classrooms has an aircondition system.

High School Department

The High School Department is composed of three buildings. Each Classroom has its own television and an aircondition system. The levels are grades 7–10.

Canteen

The Main School Canteen primarily serves the Grade School and High School Departments. The College Department has its own cafeteria.

SBC Gymnasium

The SBC Gymnasium is often the venue for Provincial or City Competitions for Sports. Different Programs are also held here like SportsFest, Graduation Day etc.

SBC Senior High School

The SBC Gymnasium is demolished and this building is the replacement for it.

SBC College Department

=== Auditorium ===
St. Bridget College has an auditorium which was built in 1957. It was temporarily closed in 2006 due to renovations. It reopened on September 14, 2010, and was renamed as St. Bridget College - Manuela Q. Pastor Auditorium.

Many Theatrical Acts and performances, some of which were Peter Pan, Joseph, From Light to Radiance, Yakap ng Pastol, Hansel & Gretel, Kalumpang at Kumintang, and the school's own version of Disney's award-winning musical "The Lion King". Cherished moments among graduating classes like the Elementary Department Grade Six students' Passing Through (formerly One Last Time), the High School graduating students' Parents' Night and the college graduating batch Soiree were also annual happenings in the auditorium. Commencement Exercises are also being held here.

== School publications ==
St. Bridget College has three official school organs Beaconette for Elementary Department, The Beacon (English) and Ang Sulyap (Tagalog) for High School and Sibul for College.
