= 1959 Philippine Senate election =

16th Philippine senatorial election

- November 10, 1959

8 (of the 24) seats in the Senate 13 seats needed for a majority
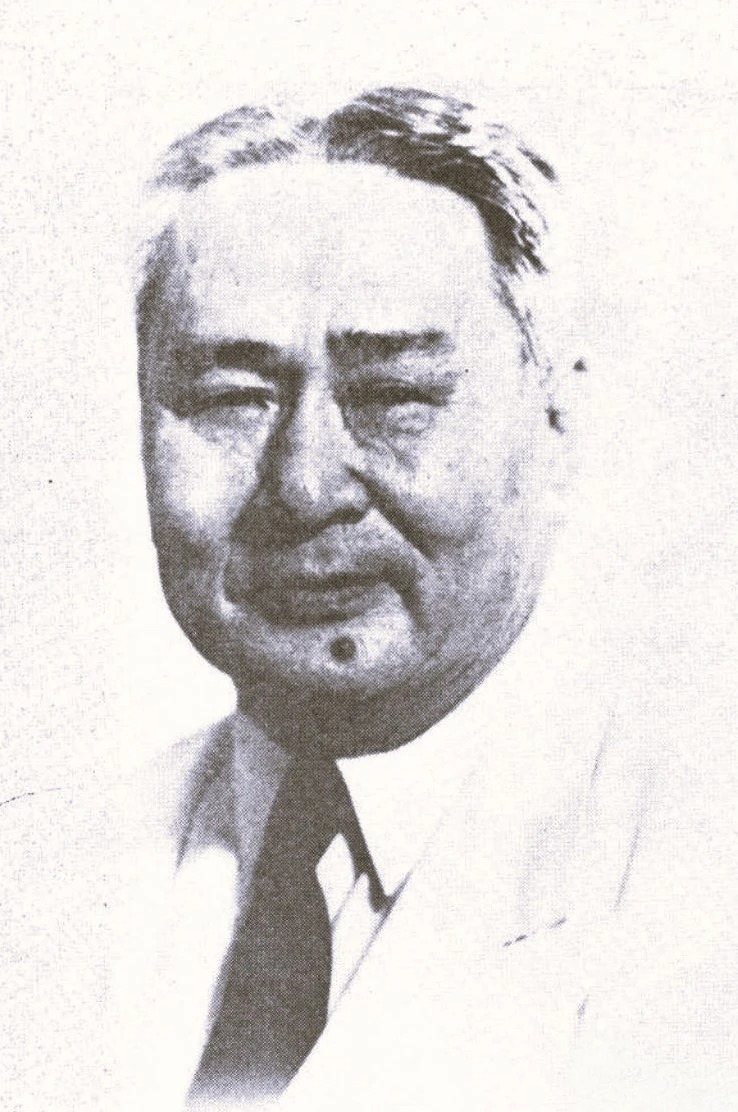

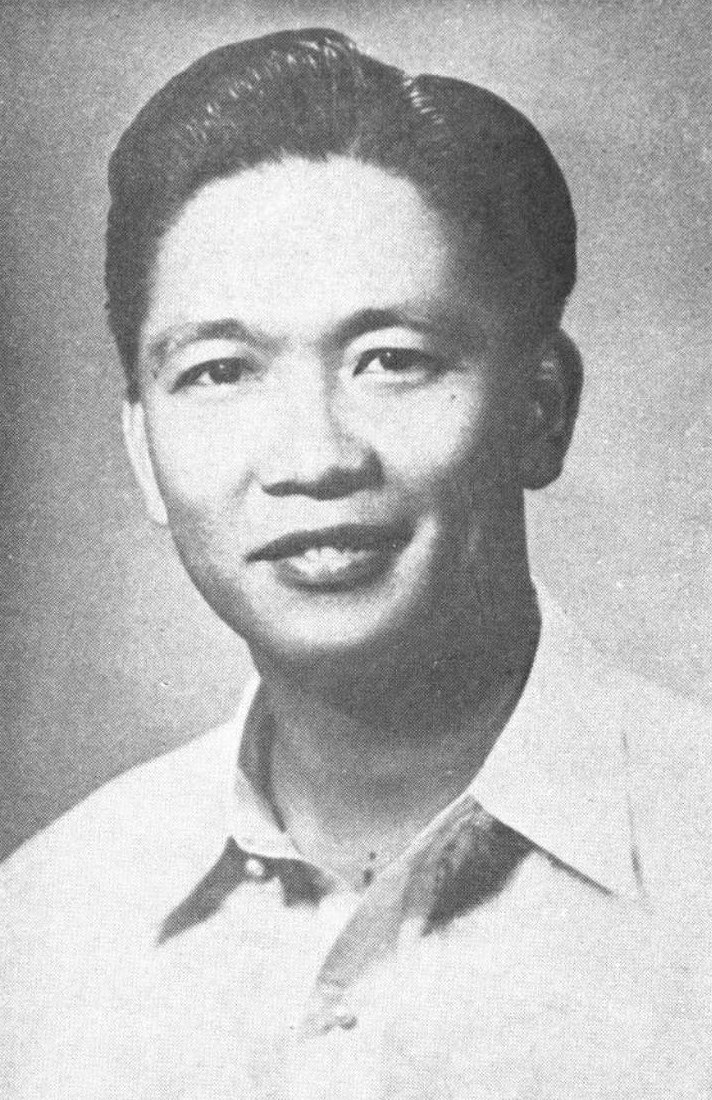

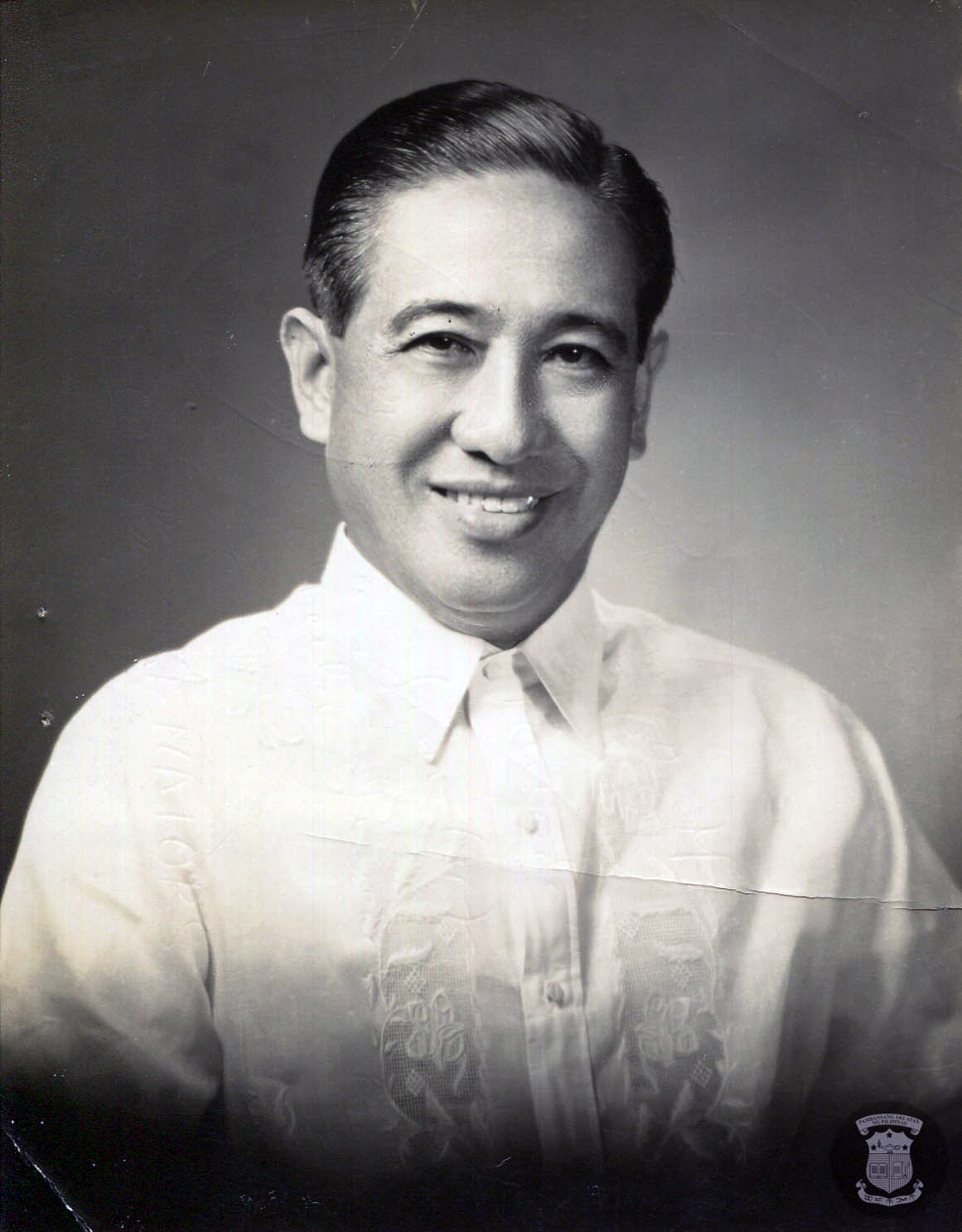

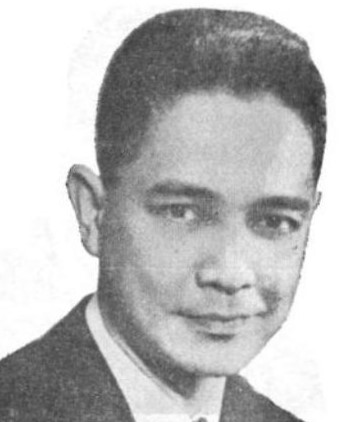
	Majority party	Minority party
Leader	Eulogio Rodriguez	Ferdinand Marcos
Party	Nacionalista	Liberal
Seats before	19 (4 up)	2 (0 up)
Seats won	5	2
Seats after	19	4
Seat change	Steady	▲2
Popular vote	15,426,288	9,691,155
Percentage	45.04	28.29
Swing	▼2.86	▼3.82
	Third party	Fourth party
Leader	Lorenzo Tañada	Raul Manglapus (lost)
Party	NCP	Progressive
Seats before	1 (1 up)	1 (1 up)
Seats won	1	0
Seats after	1	0
Seat change	0	▼1
Popular vote	2,029,200	7,059,564
Percentage	5.92	20.61
Swing	▼1.11	▲8.36
Senate President before election
Eulogio Rodriguez
Nacionalista
Elected Senate President
Eulogio Rodriguez
Nacionalista

The 16th election of members to the Senate of the Philippines was held on November 10, 1959. It was known as the 1959 Philippine midterm elections as the date when the elected officials take office falls halfway through President Carlos P. Garcia's four-year term.

The Liberal Party continued chipping away from the Nacionalista Party's dominance in the Senate, winning two more seats, although the Nacionalistas still possessed 19 out of 24 seats in the chamber. The Grand Alliance (GA) coalition, formed between the Progressive Party of the Philippines (PPP) and defectors of the Nacionalista and Liberal parties, did not win any Senate seat despite being supported with an influence campaign by the United States' Central Intelligence Agency.

== Electoral system ==
Philippine Senate elections are held via plurality block voting with staggered elections, with the country as an at-large district. The Senate has 24 seats, of which 8 seats are up every 2 years. The eight seats up were last contested in 1953; each voter has eight votes and can vote up to eight names, of which the eight candidates with the most votes winning the election.

== Retiring incumbents ==
No incumbents retired on this election.

=== Mid-term vacancies ===
1. Ruperto Kangleon (Democratic), died on February 28, 1958
2. Alejo Mabanag (Nacionalista), appointed Secretary of Justice on July 14, 1959

== Results ==
The Nacionalista Party won five seats contested in the election, while the Liberal Party won two, and the Nationalist Citizens' Party won one.

Lorenzo Tañada of the Nationalist Citizens' Party and Nacionalistas Mariano Jesús Cuenco, Fernando Lopez, and Eulogio Rodriguez defended their Senate seats. Lopez was originally from the Democratic Party, and ran as a Nacionalista on this election.

The two winning Liberals are neophyte senators: Estanislao Fernandez and Ferdinand Marcos. Also entering the Senate for the first time are Nacionalistas Alejandro Almendras and Genaro Magsaysay.

Incumbent Nacionalista senators Edmundo B. Cea and Emmanuel Pelaez both lost.

	1	2	3	4	5	6	7	8	9	10	11	12	13	14	15	16	17	18	19	20	21	22	23	24
Before election			‡^	‡	‡	‡	‡	‡	‡	‡														
Election result	Not up		LP		NCP	NP					Not up													
After election			+	+	√	*	*	√	√	√														

Key:

- ‡ Seats up
- + Gained by a party from another party
- √ Held by the incumbent
- * Held by the same party with a new senator
- ^ Vacancy

=== Per candidate ===
Candidate	Party	Votes	%
Ferdinand Marcos	Liberal Party	2,661,153	41.62
Genaro Magsaysay	Nacionalista Party	2,457,218	38.43
Fernando Lopez	Nacionalista Party	2,366,166	37.01
Estanislao Fernandez	Liberal Party	2,071,865	32.40
Mariano Jesús Cuenco	Nacionalista Party	2,046,842	32.01
Eulogio Rodriguez	Nacionalista Party	2,037,682	31.87
Lorenzo Tañada	Nationalist Citizens' Party	2,029,200	31.74
Alejandro Almendras	Nacionalista Party	1,857,782	29.06
Edmundo B. Cea	Nacionalista Party	1,764,436	27.60
Emmanuel Pelaez	Party for Philippine Progress	1,734,330	27.13
Raul Manglapus	Party for Philippine Progress	1,651,097	25.82
Juan Pajo	Nacionalista Party	1,623,637	25.39
Manuel Manahan	Party for Philippine Progress	1,512,512	23.66
Sofronio Quimson	Nacionalista Party	1,272,525	19.90
Cornelio Villareal	Liberal Party	1,266,826	19.81
Terry Adevoso	Liberal Party	1,035,147	16.19
Jacinto Borja	Liberal Party	1,021,281	15.97
Jesus Vargas	Party for Philippine Progress	1,001,981	15.67
Esmeraldo Eco	Liberal Party	947,261	14.82
Duma Sinsuat	Liberal Party	687,622	10.75
Narciso Pimentel Jr.	Party for Philippine Progress	621,915	9.73
Osmundo Mondoñedo	Party for Philippine Progress	537,729	8.41
Alfredo Abcede	Federal Party	27,383	0.43
Valentin Festejo	Independent	3,263	0.05
Gualberto Cruz	Independent	2,801	0.04
Narciso J. Alegre	New Party	2,596	0.04
Emilio Alcutse Aninao	Independent	2,379	0.04
Natalio M. Beltran Jr.	Cooperative Democratic Party	2,286	0.04
Gregorio Llanza	Independent	1,727	0.03
Consuelo Fa Alvear	Independent	1,268	0.02
Isaac Eceta	Independent	1,209	0.02
Chenchay Reyes Juta	Independent	1,048	0.02
Total		34,252,167	100.00
Total votes		6,393,724	–
Registered voters/turnout		7,822,472	81.74

=== Per party ===
Party	Votes	%	+/–	Seats				
Party	Votes	%	+/–	Up	Before	Won	After	+/−
Nacionalista Party	15,426,288	45.04	−2.86	4	19	5	19	0
Liberal Party	9,691,155	28.29	−3.82	0	2	2	4	+2
Progressive Party	7,059,564	20.61	+8.36	1	1	0	0	−1
Nationalist Citizens' Party	2,029,200	5.92	−1.11	1	1	1	1	0
Federal Party	27,383	0.08	+0.08	0	0	0	0	0
New Party	2,596	0.01	New	0	0	0	0	0
Cooperative Democratic Party	2,286	0.01	New	0	0	0	0	0
Independent	13,695	0.04	−0.44	0	0	0	0	0
Vacancy				2	2	0	0	−2
Total	34,252,167	100.00	–	8	24	8	24	0
Total votes	6,393,724	–						
Registered voters/turnout	7,822,472	81.74						

Vote share
NP	45.04%
LP	28.29%
PPP	20.61%
NCP	5.92%
Others	0.14%

Senate seats
NP	62.50%
LP	25.00%
PPP	0.00%
NCP	12.50%
Others	0.00%

== Defeated incumbents ==
1. Edmundo B. Cea (Nacionalista) retired from politics
2. Emmanuel Pelaez (Progressive) ran for Vice President of the Philippines in 1961 and won

== See also ==
- Also held on this day:
  - 1959 Philippine local elections
- Commission on Elections
- 4th Congress of the Philippines
