= Regino C. Hermosisima Jr. =

Filipino judge (born 1927)

The Honorable Regino C. Hermosisima Jr.
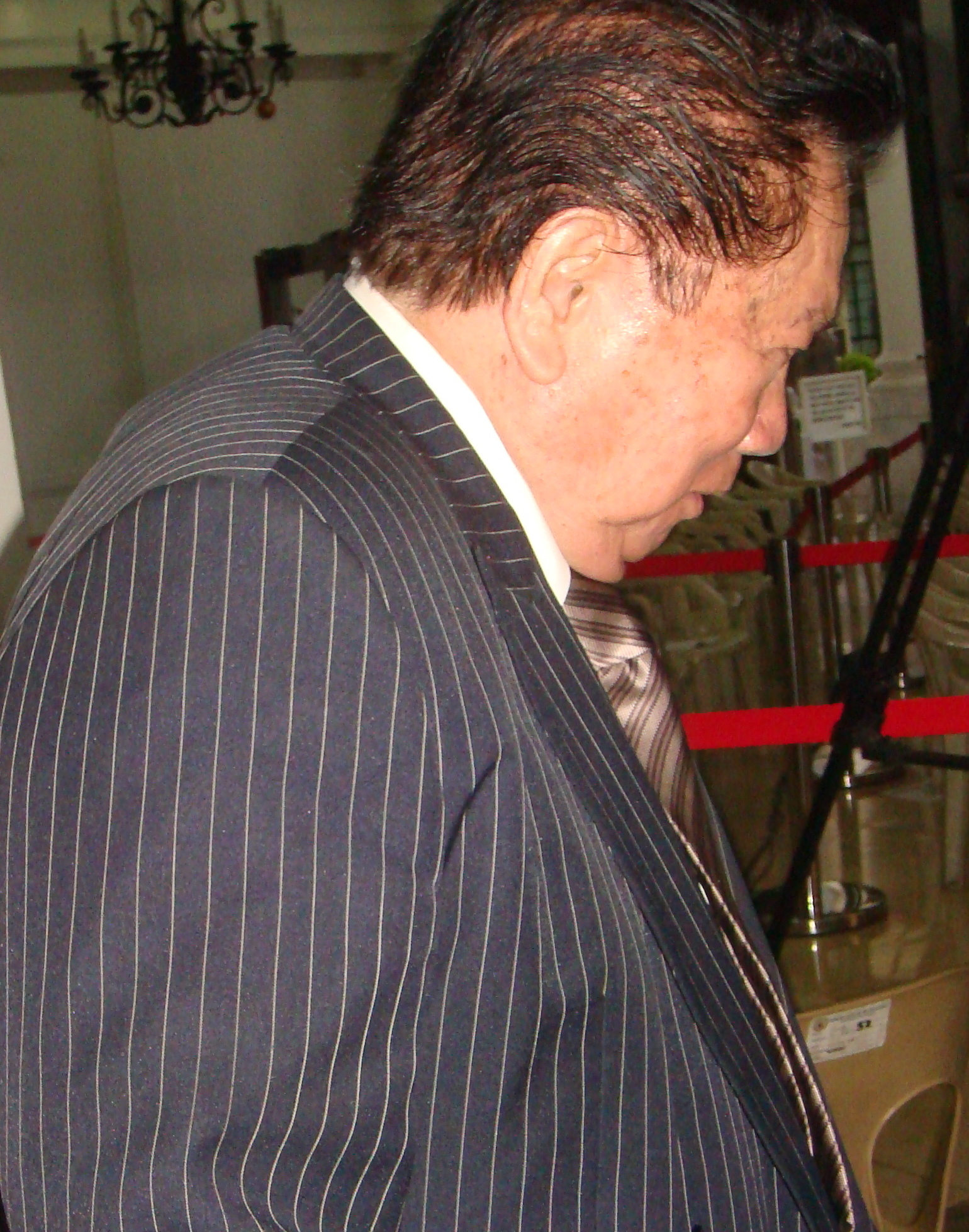
- Justice Hermosisima Jr. in 2012

4th member of the Judicial and Bar Council for retired Supreme Court justices
- In office November 24, 1997 – July 9, 2001
- Appointed by: Fidel V. Ramos
- Preceded by: Jose C. Campos
- In office September 10, 2001 – July 9, 2005
- Appointed by: Gloria Macapagal Arroyo
- In office October 4, 2005 – July 9, 2009
- Appointed by: Gloria Macapagal Arroyo
- In office July 9, 2009 – July 9, 2013
- Appointed by: Gloria Macapagal Arroyo
- Succeeded by: Angelina Sandoval Gutierrez

136th Associate Justice of the Supreme Court of the Philippines
- In office January 10, 1995 – October 18, 1997
- Appointed by: Fidel Ramos
- Preceded by: Abdulwahid Bidin
- Succeeded by: Fidel Purisima

15th Associate Justice of the Sandiganbayan
- In office May 16, 1986 – January 10, 1995
- Appointed by: Corazon Aquino
- Preceded by: Newly created seat
- Succeeded by: German Lee Jr.

Personal details
- Born: October 18, 1927 (age 99) Cebu, Philippine Islands

Regino Campos Hermosisima Jr. (born October 18, 1927) of Banilad and Sibonga, Cebu, Philippines, is a 4-termer regular member of the Judicial and Bar Council. Appointed on December 17, 1997, by Fidel Ramos, he was reappointed on September 12, 2001, and on October 4, 2005, by Gloria Macapagal Arroyo. Hermosisima Jr. was initially appointed to the Supreme Court as an Associate Justice on July 10, 1995, and retired on his 70th birthday on October 18, 1997.

== Profile ==
Hermosisima was born on October 18, 1927, at Sibonga, Cebu, Philippine Islands. Hermosisima Jr. graduated Valedictorian at the Sibonga Elementary School (1933–1940) and Salutatorian at the Cebu Provincial High School (1940–1941). He earned his Associate of Arts and his law degree with cum laude from the University of Visayas (1948–1952). He passed the Bar Examinations in 1953 with a fair rating of 83.45%.

Hermosisima Jr. started his career as Law Professor, Criminal Law and Criminal Law Review at the University of Visayas, Cebu City; he taught Evidence at the Far Eastern University, Manila and Trial Technique and Moot Court at the San Sebastian College; he was a Bar Reviewer in Criminal Law at the University of Visayas and FEU, and Bar Examiner, Criminal Law, 1999 Bar Examination.

Hermosisima Jr. attended post-graduate studies of Program for Executive Development at the Development Academy of the Philippines (1975) and at the University of the Philippines Law Center, Institute and Seminars.

Hermosisima Jr. began his legal career in private law practice (1953; 1955–1966) by establishing the famous Hermosisima Law Offices at Cebu, Basilan City, and Zamboanga City, Zamboanga del Sur. He was Technical Assistant in 1954 of the House of Representatives, Manila, City Councilor, Basilan City (1960–1963), Vice-Mayor, Basilan City (1963), chair, Eighth Amnesty Commission in 1973 at Mindanao (appointed by the then Secretary of Justice Vicente Abad Santos, while serving as CFI Judge of Basilan City).

Hermosisisa Jr. rose from the ranks. He had 31 years in the judiciary, starting as trial judge (20 YEARS): Judge, Court of First Instance (1966–1976) Basilan City and Province; Judge, CFI of Cebu (1976–1979), Branches IX and XI; Judge, Circuit Criminal Court (1983–1986), Cebu City, Branch XVIII, Region 7.

Hermosisima Jr. was appointed by Corazon Aquino as Sandiganbayan Justice (9 years) (May 16, 1986 – July 18, 1995), and was promoted as an Associate Justice on July 10, 1995, and retired on his 70th birthday on October 18, 1997. He is the incumbent chair of the Board of Trustees, University of Cebu. He was awarded a Medal of Honor as the most distinguished alumnus of the University of Visayas.

== Aquino-Galman case ==
On December 2, 1985, Justice Manuel Pamaran of the Sandiganbayan rendered judgment in Criminal Cases Nos. 10010-10011 acquitting all the 16 accused, who allegedly killed Ninoy Aquino However, the Supreme Court nullified the proceedings, which is regarded as a "sham", and ordered a retrial of the cases before the Sandiganbayan (Galman vs. Sandiganbayan, 144 SCRA 43, 1986).

In his 177 pages decision dated September 28, 1990, Hermosisima Jr.'s Sandiganbayn found the said accused guilty as principals of the crime of murder in both Criminal Cases Nos. 10010 and 10011, and he sentenced them to reclusion perpetua in each case. The judgment became final after this Court denied petitioners’ petition for review of the Sandiganbayan decision for failure to show reversible error in the questioned decision, as well as their subsequent motion for reconsideration. In August 2004, the said accused asked the High Tribunal to re-open the case, but the last appeal was denied.

On August 21, 2007, (Aquino's 24th death anniversary), Enrile stated that the case of the 14 soldiers incarcerated for 24 years now, due to the assassination of Ninoy Aquino should be reviewed for clemency. Enrile paid for the legal services of the soldiers during their trial and said the soldiers and their families have suffered enough. 15 soldiers of the Aviation Security Command were sentenced to double life imprisonment for the double murder of Aquino and scapegoat Rolando Galman, and one of them had died. They were all initially acquitted in December 1985, by the Sandiganbayan's Manuel Pamaran, but the Sandiganbayan's Regino C. Hermosisima Jr. (promoted to Supreme Court Justice and incumbent 3 termer Judicial and Bar Council regular member) convicted them on September 28, 1990.

On the 24th anniversary of the death of Ninoy, Cory stated that she had forgiven the 14 incarcerated soldiers for the assassination of her husband but she would not ever nod to appeals for their release.

== Two guns that changed Philippine history ==
On August 21, 2007, the 24th anniversary of Ninoy's murder, two guns that altered the course of Philippine history are rusting away in the drawers of the Sandiganbayan. The first is the charcoal-toned Smith & Wesson .357 Magnum pistol, with a grip made of deer horn, was discovered near the body of Rolando Galman, and was marked "Exhibit 32. Its twin or the second gun surfaced when the Supreme Court ordered a retrial in 1986. This second gun, which has the same serial number "K919079" as the first one was marked as "Exhibit 12", and really added to the mystery of Aquino's assassination. Sandiganbayan Associate Justice Regino C. Hermosisima Jr. in a 177-page decision promulgated in September 1990, incarcerated the 16 soldiers who were already acquitted by Manuel Pamaran's Sandiganbayan. In the 1990 judgment, the gun's owner was Col. Octavio Alvarez, who retired from the military on March 7, 1985.

Both the Agrava Board report and the Hermosisima Jr. court resolved that it was either a .45 cal. or a .38 cal. pistol that was used in killing Aquino, thereby dismissing Olivas' magnum theory, which pointed to Rolando Galman as the killer and the weapon as the .357 Magnum pistol. The court maintained that it was Moreno who shot Aquino but that he used a different gun. But the real weapon and the masterminds are still unaccounted for after 24 years. Meanwhile, the two mysterious Magnum revolvers will remain at the Sandiganbayan's bodega until the return of Capt. Felipe Valerio, the group commander of the Avsecom 805th Special Operations Squadron, might be the last key to Aquino's death.

== Timeline of Aquino-Galman murder ==
- August 21, 1983 - Ninoy Aquino was assassinated after disembarking a China Airlines plane at Manila International Airport. Also killed was Rolando Galman.
- August 24, 1983 – Ferdinand Marcos set a fact-finding commission headed by Supreme Court Chief Justice Enrique Fernando to investigate the Aquino murder (composed of four retired Supreme Court Justices who resigned, after its composition was challenged in court and thereafter, Arturo M. Tolentino declined appointment as board chair).
- August 31, 1983 – Burial of Ninoy at the Manila Memorial Park, Parañaque after the 11-hour procession joined by 2 million Filipinos.
- October 22, 1983 – Marcos created another fact-finding Agrava Board, headed by former Court of Appeals Justice Corazon Agrava, chair, with lawyer Luciano E. Salazar, businessman Dante G. Santos, labor leader Ernesto F. Herrera and educator Amado C. Dizon, as members (3 P.D. 1886 dated October 14, 1983, and Amendatory P.D. 1903 dated February 8, 1984). It held 125 hearing days from November 3, 1983 (including 3 hearings in Tokyo and 8 hearings in Los Angeles, California), heard 194 witnesses recorded in 20,377 pages of transcripts.
- October 22, 1984 – Agrava Board released the reports concluding that military officers, including Armed Forces Chief of Staff Gen. Fabian Ver, conspired to kill Ninoy; the Supreme Court assigned the case to the Sandiganbayan.
- December 2, 1985 – Manuel Pamaran Sandiganbayan acquitted all the accused.
- May 16, 1986 – Corazon Aquino appointed Regino C. Hermosisima Jr. Justice of the Sandigangbayan (until July 18, 1995).
- September 12, 1986 – The Supreme Court ordered a retrial, granting the 2nd Motion for Reconsideration in G.R. No. 72670.
- September 16, 1986 – The Sandiganbayan issued a warrant to arrest 25 military men, led by Ver, and a civilian.
- September 28, 1989 – Marcos died in exile at age 72 in Hawaii.
- September 28, 1990 – Regino C. Hermosisima Jr. penned the 177-page Sandiganbayan judgment to jail the 16 suspects, sentencing them to reclusion perpetua in each case. Convicted of the crime were the Avsecom chief, Brig. Gen. Luther Custodio, Capt. Romeo Bautista, 2nd Lt. Jesus Castro, and Sergeants Claro L. Lat, Arnulfo de Mesa, Filomeno Miranda, Rolando de Guzman, Ernesto Mateo, Rodolfo Desolong, Ruben Aquino, and Arnulfo Artates, gunman Constable Rogelio Moreno, M/Sgt. Pablo Martinez, C1C Mario Lazaga, A1C Cordova Estelo and A1C Felizardo Taran. Custodio died of cancer while in prison in 1991. Estelo was stabbed dead in 2005 by another inmate. However, no mastermind was named.
- July 23, 1991 – The Supreme Court affirmed the conviction.
- July 10, 1995 - Fidel Ramos appointed Regino C. Hermosisima Jr. Associate Justice of the Philippine Supreme Court and retired on his 70th natal day in October 18, 1997.
- December 17, 1997 – Regino C. Hermosisima Jr. was appointed Judicial and Bar Council regular member.
- November 21, 1998 – Ver died of a lung ailment in Bangkok.
- September 12, 2001 – Regino C. Hermosisima Jr. was re-appointed Judicial and Bar Council regular member.
- March 8, 2005 – The Supreme Court denied the petition of the accused (filed in August 2004) to re-open the case.
- October 4, 2005 – Regino C. Hermosisima Jr. was reappointed Judicial and Bar Council regular member, for his 3rd term, duplicating the 3rd term of Teresita Cruz-Sison. His last term was set to expire on July 9, 2009.
- August 21, 2007 – The 24th anniversary of Ninoy's murder. Chief Justice Andres Narvasa appealed for the closure of the case; Juan Ponce Enrile asked for the review for clemency in favor of the 14 convicts; Palawan Bishop Pedro Arigo, chair of the CBCP’s Episcopal Commission on Prison Pastoral Care (ECPPC) asked for a pardon for the convicts, though he said the ECPPC will have to study the cases before asking clemency for the soldiers; Corazon Aquino and Benigno Aquino III forgave the 14 soldiers but opposed their appeals for clemency or parole (which Sec. Raul Gonzales submitted to the President on 2004); Eduardo Ermita stated that the Bureau of Pardons and Parole had recommended a grant of executive clemency.
- August 24, 2007 - Eduardo Ermita officially announced that due to political implications, the appeal for clemency by the 14 soldiers was archived, even if the Bureau of Pardons and Parole presently reviews the plea. The executive secretary refused to give a time frame for the review.

== Judicial and Bar Council ==
In April 2004, Hermosisima Jr. was duly appointed chair of The Change Management Committee's Technical Group, with the function of restructuring and strengthening of the Judicial and Bar Council (JBC) and the Philippine Judicial Academy (PHILJA).

On March 10, 2006, Hermosisima Jr. delivered a brilliant speech on the Judicial and Bar Council Strategic and Operations Planning Workshop at the Pan Pacific Hotel, Adriatico, Manila.

Likewise, he stated in his JBC message that the Council aims to nominate the "best and the brightest" among the applicants. In support, he cited Oliver Wendell Holmes Jr., justice of the Supreme Court of the United States - (T)he rectitude and the fairness in the way the courts operate must be manifest to the members of the community, particularly to those whose interests are affected by the exercise of their functions.

== YMCA ==
Hermosisima Jr. was past President of the Councils of YMCA movements in Asia and Pacific countries and Territories and incumbent Member of Executive Committee, Standing Committees and Task Groups For the Quadrennium:2004-2007 and Member also of the CONSTITUTIONAL MATTERS, YMCA. On November 27, 2005, the feast day of Our Lady of the Miraculous Medal, Hermosisima Jr. was reelected national President of the YMCA, Philippines (established in 1911, 94 years ago).

Hermosisima Jr. was also:

- Charter Member, Community Chest
- Past President, Basilan JAYCEES
- Past President, Cebu Capitol Tennis Club
- Past President, Cebu Tennis Club
- Past President, Philippine Columbian Association
- Past President, Rotary Club of Basilan
- Past President, Rotary Club of Cebu
- President, Parish Pastoral Council, St. Peter Parish, Quezon City
- President, YMCA of Cebu
- Roman Catholic Lay Leader
- Special Minister of Holy Communion

Hermosisima Jr. wrote brilliant ponencias: Sombongh v. Court of Appeals, Atok Big Wedge Mining Company v. Intermediate Appellate Court, Catholic Bishop of Balanga v. Court of Appeals, Equatorial Realty Development Inc. v. Court of Appeals, Estate of Mariano San Pedro vs. Court of Appeals, GMRC, Inc., et al. v. Court of Appeals, Islamic Directorate of the Philippines v. Court of Appeals, De Santos v. Hon. Angeles, Defensor-Santiago, et al. v. Comelec, inter alia.

== Family ==
Hermosisima Jr. lives at a small condominium at the Capitol Estates, Fairview, near the St. Peter Parish and Ever Gotesco, Fairview, Quezon City.

Papa Ino to his grandchildren Regino is married to Rosemary P. Navarro of Alaminos, Pangasinan, and Lamitan, Basilan Province. Atty. Marceliano Hermosisima, Assistant Vice-President, Trust Department, Philippine National Bank; Mr. Mario Hermosisima, businessman; Dr. Carol Hermosisima-Carabaña, Asst. City Health Officer, Zamboanga City; Dr. Monalisa Hermosisima, Chua, Consultant Physician, Chong Hua Hospital, Cebu City; and Dr. Beverly Ann Hermosisima, Consultant Physician, Chong Hua Hospital, Cebu City.

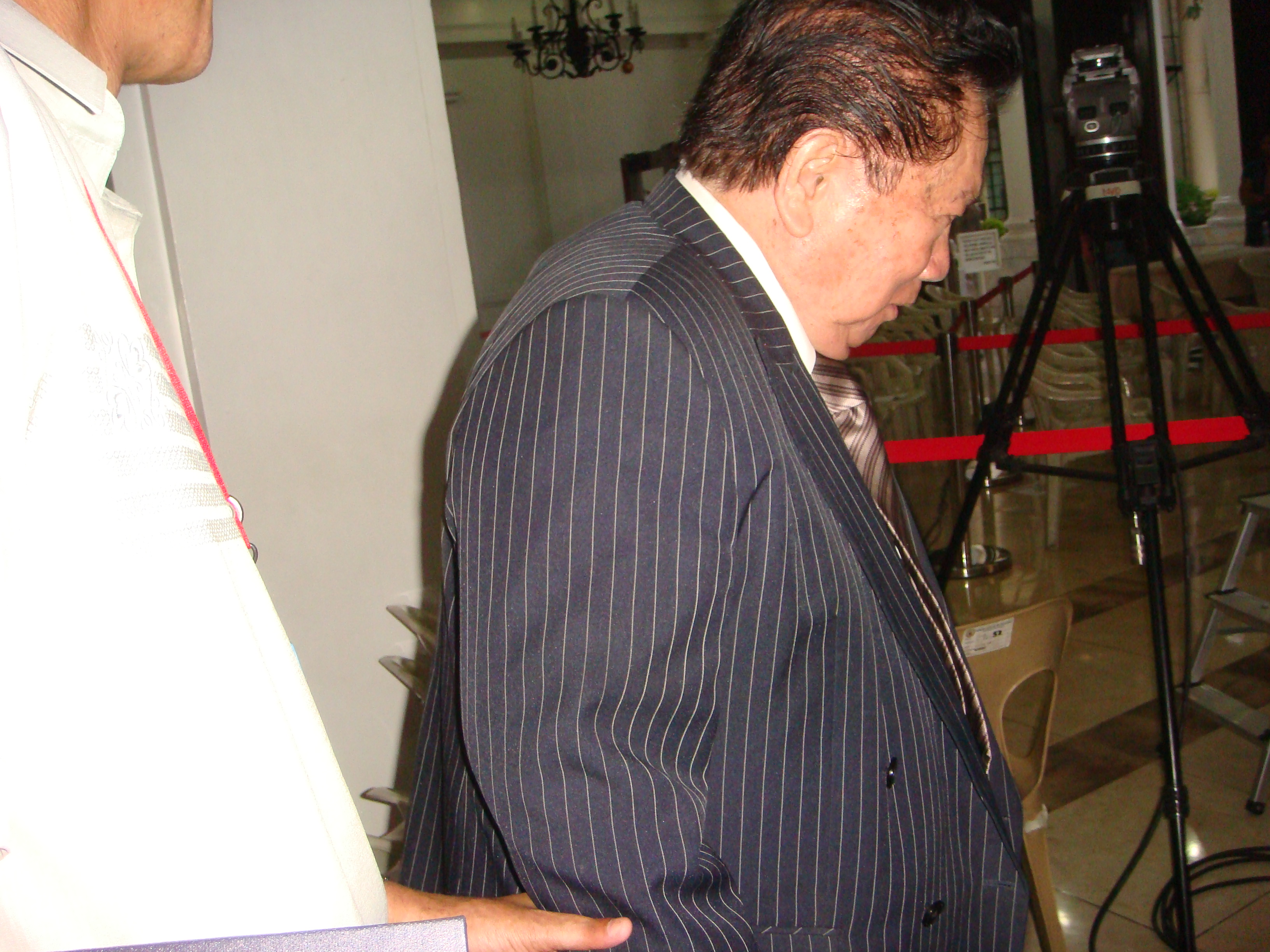
JBC member Justice Regino C. Hermosisima Jr. at the Press conference of the JBC Chief Justice Panel Interview

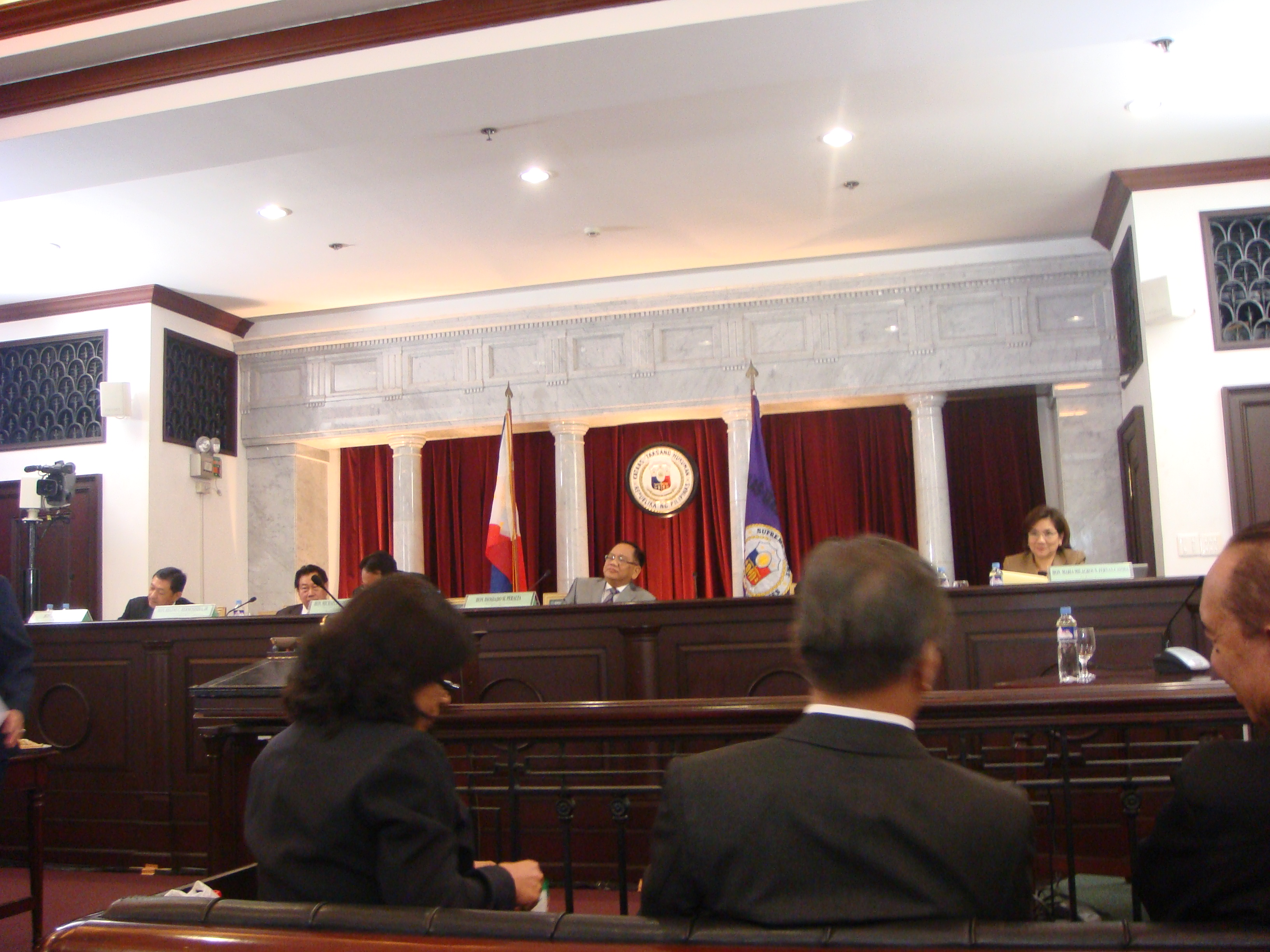
Hermososisima Jr. at the Panel Interview (2nd from left)

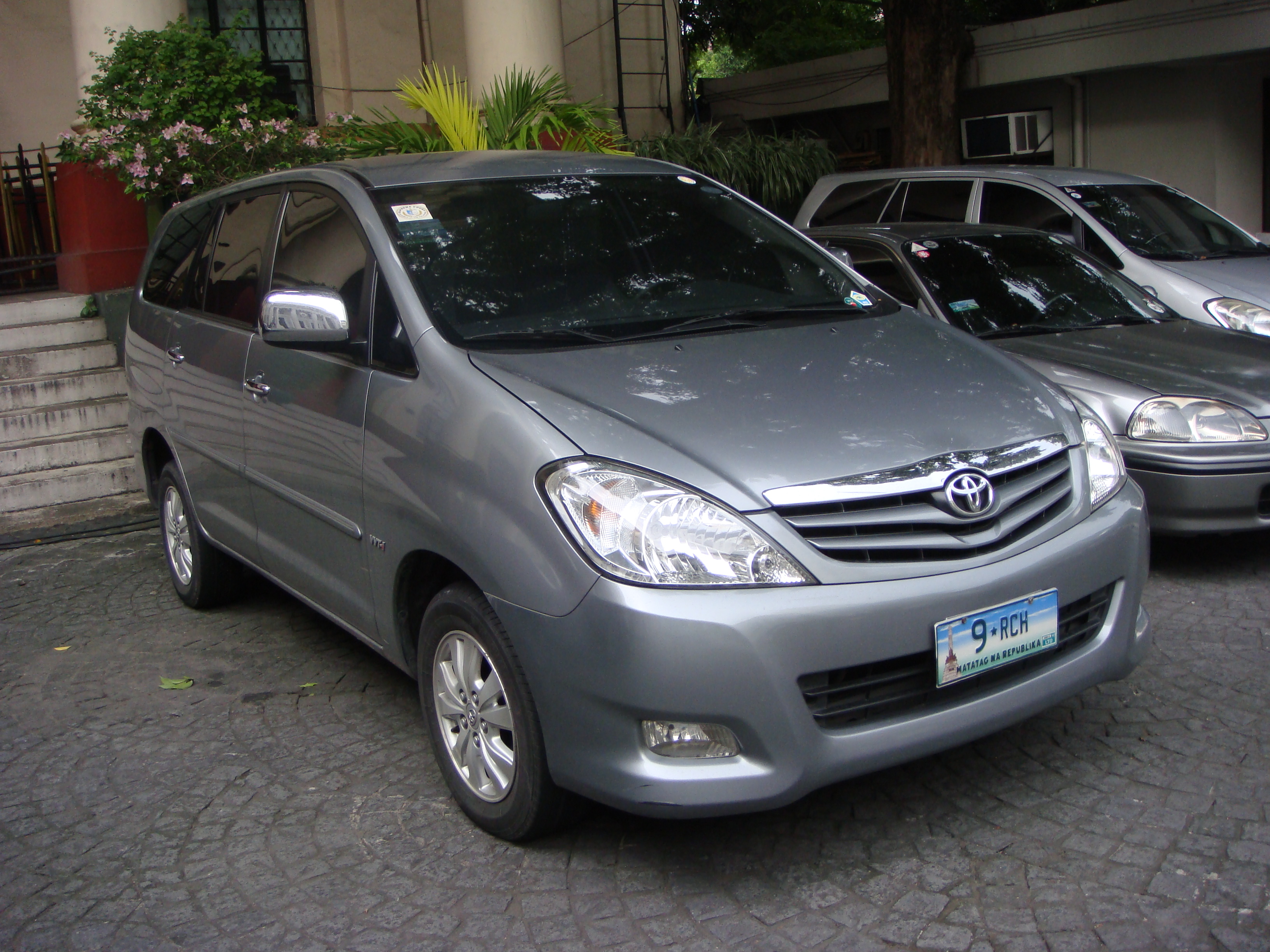
Official car with 1997 plate RCH of Justice Regino C. Hermosisima jr. JBC member.

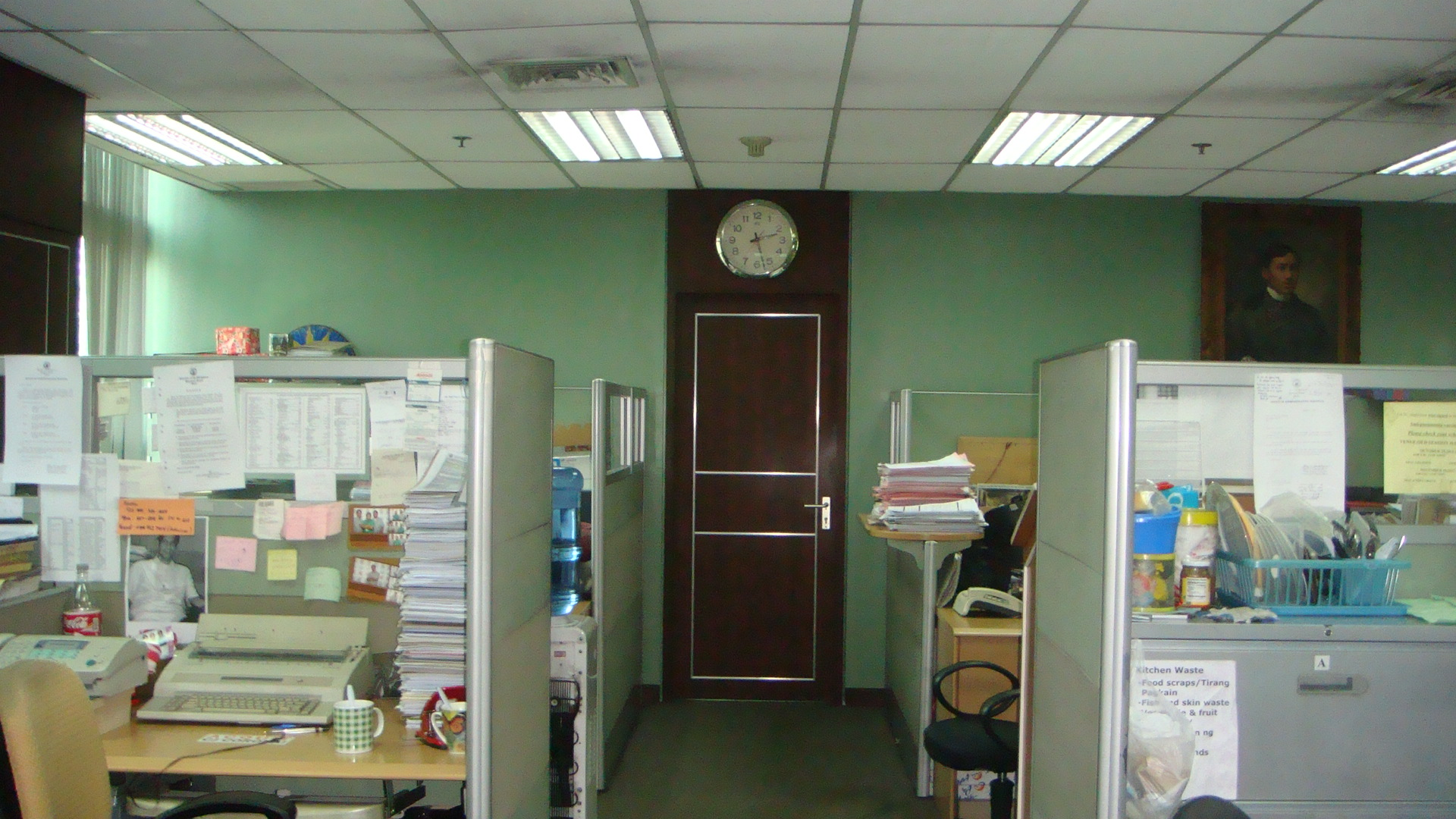
JBC court office and Judicial Chambers of JBC Member Regino C. Hermosisima Jr.

== See also ==
- Associate Justice of the Supreme Court of the Philippines
- Chief Justice of the Supreme Court of the Philippines
- Constitution of the Philippines
- Supreme Court of the Philippines

Legal offices
Preceded by Abdulwahid Bidin	Associate Justice of the Supreme Court of the Philippines; 1995–1997	Succeeded by Fidel Purisima
Preceded by Newy Created Seat	Associate Justice of the Sandiganbayan; 1986–1995	Succeeded by German Lee, Jr.
Preceded by Jose Campos Jr.	JBC Member repsenting the Retired Membera of the Supreme Court; 1997–2013	Succeeded by Angelina Sandoval-Gutierrez
