= Grand Alliance (Philippines) =

Philippine political coalition of opposition in 1961

- Leader: Raul Manglapus
- Founded: 1959
- Dissolved: 1965
- Coalition members: Progressive; Liberal (Note: Defectors' wing only); Nacionalista

The Grand Alliance (GA) was a political multi-party electoral alliance in the Philippines that existed from 1959 to 1965. It was composed of members of the Progressive Party and defectors from the Nacionalista Party and the Liberal Party.

== History ==
=== Formation ===
In 1959, the Liberals, led by Vice-president Diosdado Macapagal and Senate President Ferdinand Marcos, negotiated with Progressives for a possible alliance with the two parties. Under the terms of the negotiation, Manuel Manahan and Raul Manglapus would be included in the senatorial slate of the Liberal Party for the 1959 senatorial elections. According to Macapagal, Manahan initially agreed to the coalition.

However, the Progressive camp wanted Senator Emmanuel Pelaez and former Defense Secretary Jesus Vargas. This eventually found the support of the Liberal Senator Ambrosio Padilla. Due to a disagreement with the terms, the proposed coalition broke down. According to Manglapus, this also resulted in Padilla being ousted as Liberal.

With negotiations with the Liberals failing to move forward, the Progressives and defectors of both the Nacionalistas and Liberals formed the Grand Alliance (GA).

=== 1959 election ===
The GA put up its own six-man slate for the 1959 senatorial elections. Manahan, Manglapus, and Vargas represented the Progressive wing of the alliance, Pelaez represented the Nacionalista wing, while Narciso Pimentel Jr. and Osmundo Mondoñedo represented the Liberal wing. As candidates, Manahan, Manglapus, Vargas and Pelaez were backed by the United States' Central Intelligence Agency (CIA), with CIA operative Joseph Burkholder Smith having been assigned to oversee an influence campaign to help the GA win in the elections.

By the end of the election, none of them were successful in acquiring a Senate seat.

== Members ==
The following had served as members of the Grand Alliance:

- Jose S. Andres
- Vicente Araneta
- Abdulwahid Bidin
- Osmundo S. de Guzman
- Rogelio de la Rosa
- Manuel Manahan
- Raul Manglapus
- Osmundo Mondoñedo
- Ambrosio Padilla
- Emmanuel Pelaez
- Rodrigo Perez
- Narciso Pimentel Jr.
- Francisco Soc Rodrigo
- Murphy Sangkula
- Jesus Vargas
