= Batasang Pambansa canvass for the 1981 Philippine presidential election =

The following is the official canvassing of votes by the Batasang Pambansa for the 1981 Philippine presidential election. The canvassing started on June 20, 1981 and ended on June 21, 1981.

Candidate	Party	Votes	%
Ferdinand Marcos (incumbent)	Kilusang Bagong Lipunan	18,309,360	88.02
Alejo Santos	Nacionalista Party (Roy wing) (Note: Santos ran under Jose Roy's wing of the Nacionalista Party, while the rest of the party boycotted the election.)	1,716,449	8.25
Bartolome Cabangbang	Federal Party	749,845	3.60
Delfin R. Manapaz	Independent	6,499	0.03
Ursula C. Dajao	Independent	4,955	0.02
Benito L. Valdez	Independent	4,224	0.02
Lope B. Rimando	Independent	1,954	0.01
Lucio A. Hinigpit	Sovereign Citizen Party	1,945	0.01
Pacifico S. Morelos	Independent	1,740	0.01
Jose C. Igrobay	Independent	1,421	0.01
Simeon G. del Rosario	Independent	1,234	0.01
Salvador Q. Enage	Independent	1,185	0.01
Florencio Z. Tipano	Independent	592	0.00
Total		20,801,403	100.00
Valid votes		20,801,403	95.23
Invalid/blank votes		1,042,426	4.77
Total votes		21,843,829	100.00
Registered voters/turnout		26,986,451	80.94
Source: Nohlen, Grotz, Hartmann, Hasall and Santos

Province/City	Marcos	Santos	Cabangbang	Manlapaz	Dajao	Valdez	Rimando	Hingpit	Morelos	Igrobay	Del Rosario	Enage	Tipanao
Abra	85,633	302	53	0	1	0	0	0	0	0	1	0	0
Agusan del Norte	48,920	28,264	1,449	30	18	22	8	68	7	0	1	5	4
Agusan del Sur	115,080	12,179	2,074	21	25	10	5	79	6	3	4	11	3
Aklan	152,479	1,855	301	8	0	10	0	0	0	0	2	0	0
Albay	182,609	46,491	3,122	88	92	130	35	74	37	44	43	29	11
Angeles City	49,429	8,574	3,368	27	75	12	13	6	14	3	7	6	3
Antique	169,359	682	330	2	0	0	0	0	0	14	0	0	0
Aurora	–	–	–	–	–	–	–	–	–	–	–	–	–
Bacolod City	161,855	452	504	0	0	0	0	0	0	0	0	0	0
Bago	44,845	169	58	0	0	0	0	0	0	0	0	0	0
Baguio	59,339	5,836	3,048	31	57	38	122	9	13	8	13	5	7
Bais	16,357	791	1,895	6	5	0	0	1	3	2	2	1	0
Basilan	51,544	5,820	2,081	10	15	16	5	2	7	1	7	4	9
Bataan	115,133	14,559	1,646	1,376	30	82	19	10	21	16	17	6	4
Batanes	–	–	–	–	–	–	–	–	–	–	–	–	–
Batangas	323,158	43,811	4,456	126	86	84	44	32	30	31	29	12	9
Batangas City	50,576	4,863	1,016	13	12	12	6	6	7	10	8	3	4
Benguet	83,277	15,464	1,107	30	73	48	31	10	29	9	9	15	7
Bohol	276,407	18,639	33,517	39	18	33	2	11	15	4	4	7	4
Bukidnon	165,234	15,910	19,896	75	127	153	41	34	62	10	25	37	20
Bulacan	351,042	110,607	3,823	87	65	17	29	10	24	27	9	8	10
Butuan	39,317	25,315	1,455	27	25	18	4	413	29	0	2	7	1
Cabanatuan	58,547	5,712	612	3	2	0	2	0	0	1	0	0	1
Cadiz	59,488	157	72	0	0	0	0	0	0	0	0	0	0
Cagayan	311,783	8,166	467	18	36	35	15	6	11	1	4	3	2
Cagayan de Oro	70,172	6,593	8,453	41	64	79	13	31	15	11	16	15	12
Calbayog	38,485	2,129	399	6	2	0	0	0	0	21	0	2	0
Caloocan	256,048	10,813	5,406	42	22	21	16	2	17	16	10	4	8
Camarines Norte	40,293	28,136	1,716	96	55	65	15	14	18	12	28	13	10
Camarines Sur	226,582	85,002	1,722	55	111	53	31	13	33	13	26	17	13
Camiguin	21,308	1,396	701	4	2	2	0	6	2	1	0	2	3
Canlaon	10,246	528	384	4	1	0	0	0	0	0	0	1	0
Capiz	230,033	6,900	2,300	0	0	2	0	0	4	0	1	12	0
Catanduanes	46,485	26,877	28	2	1	5	0	0	1	0	0	1	0
Cavite	303,187	2,113	386	3	8	7	10	6	16	4	4	6	4
Cavite City	38,822	5,567	1,323	11	13	7	11	0	5	10	7	2	1
Cebu	503,905	23,998	26,111	96	49	39	14	23	27	8	16	12	6
Cebu City	248,385	20,190	18,774	2	94	72	0	2	0	4	0	0	1
Cotabato City	25,795	4,201	800	5	109	16	6	1	2	3	1	3	0
Dagupan	36,729	5,262	671	5	5	28	2	0	0	3	4	1	1
Danao	51,408	95	53	0	0	0	0	0	0	0	0	0	0
Dapitan	19,528	1,828	654	5	4	0	1	0	0	1	1	0	0
Davao City	112,838	6,970	98,835	55	94	83	45	41	26	16	24	16	9
Davao del Norte	158,528	8,234	106,151	58	124	85	61	41	45	11	34	24	10
Davao del Sur	103,437	4,909	56,135	25	59	48	16	19	21	7	24	8	8
Davao Oriental	87,293	4,978	38,444	14	31	20	10	5	6	4	11	4	1
Dipolog	22,068	2,825	1,694	9	11	29	3	1	2	1	2	1	3
Dumaguete	21,123	2,532	3,626	9	37	20	3	7	7	5	7	2	3
Eastern Samar	137,958	4,241	1,459	0	0	0	0	0	0	0	0	0	0
General Santos	49,425	3,937	7,158	13	27	10	8	10	15	23	10	4	4
Gingoog	23,931	3,200	1,964	31	11	11	4	8	4	5	6	1	2
Ifugao	40,950	2,600	233	4	10	5	3	2	2	1	2	0	1
Iligan City	39,742	11,191	3,875	38	67	57	12	14	22	11	19	16	7
Ilocos Norte	174,932	0	0	0	0	0	0	0	0	0	0	0	0
Ilocos Sur	225,761	2,533	401	1	2	0	0	2	0	0	0	2	0
Iloilo	547,040	11,907	6,184	0	0	0	0	0	0	0	0	0	0
Iloilo City	156,407	11,047	4,734	0	0	0	0	0	0	0	0	0	0
Iriga City	17,004	10,211	156	3	5	2	0	2	1	0	1	1	1
Isabela	423,367	3,089	259	0	6	1	4	1	0	0	0	0	0
Kalinga-Apayao	87,196	3,434	248	11	20	14	10	9	3	1	3	12	3
La Carlota City	31,874	0	0	0	0	0	0	0	0	0	0	0	0
La Union	227,319	3,696	890	0	0	0	0	0	0	0	0	0	0
Laguna	317,699	42,833	4,945	3	8	7	3	2	0	3	1	4	1
Lanao del Norte	103,905	11,721	3,617	36	54	98	6	10	25	2	12	15	9
Lanao del Sur	208,092	4,750	313	0	0	0	0	0	0	0	0	0	0
Laoag City	39,149	30	19	0	0	0	0	0	0	0	0	0	0
Lapu-Lapu City	43,081	998	1,279	3	8	1	1	2	2	2	1	1	1
Las Piñas	71,045	5,649	286	22	1	11	15	2	25	6	7	1	1
Legazpi City	36,289	4,932	385	8	12	16	2	2	3	4	10	2	3
Leyte	516,241	5,768	2,381	0	0	0	0	2	0	0	0	0	0
Lipa City	45,509	4,841	1,084	15	9	16	8	4	3	5	4	6	2
Lucena City	35,666	7,024	942	11	15	9	3	3	3	9	4	3	1
Maguindanao	229,992	9,619	906	37	53	95	32	37	58	31	32	32	24
Makati	282,765	12,654	6,652	166	195	57	65	81	50	80	40	100	10
Malabon	123,392	1,766	970	0	0	0	0	1	0	0	0	0	0
Mandaluyong	114,719	10,411	4,171	12	6	7	8	0	5	0	4	3	2
Mandaue City	40,845	2,200	5,207	11	11	8	4	11	2	2	2	1	0
Manila	687,024	78,196	29,211	1,116	506	372	219	126	134	249	102	116	58
Marawi City	25,082	3,225	183	2	0	1	1	0	6	1	0	1	0
Marikina	74,107	13,357	13,688	22	24	4	13	2	0	7	2	3	0
Marinduque	69,078	5,715	500	26	102	28	9	2	29	3	8	4	2
Masbate	182,234	16,318	1,950	91	23	23	13	3	19	2	10	9	1
Misamis Occidental	66,338	8,859	5,820	74	85	54	12	10	21	5	14	9	3
Misamis Oriental	118,102	12,060	8,287	95	91	65	25	45	13	6	12	12	8
Mountain Province	33,413	2,822	312	23	19	3	16	20	6	7	10	6	3
Muntinlupa	76,927	2,657	734	5	6	0	0	1	0	5	0	2	0
Naga City	28,622	6,378	385	9	28	10	6	4	2	6	6	2	7
Navotas	71,071	3,500	309	27	0	4	3	5	10	2	10	2	0
Negros Occidental	527,330	1,299	1,239	0	0	0	0	0	0	0	0	0	0
Negros Oriental	202,622	15,270	24,166	81	67	47	12	12	29	5	19	11	2
North Cotabato	127,700	41,339	7,090	44	59	120	39	29	50	9	24	17	19
Northern Samar	148,552	12,851	1,176	15	10	20	4	9	10	2	4	5	0
Nueva Ecija	328,440	28,812	1,375	28	26	37	3	2	5	7	7	6	1
Nueva Vizcaya	97,222	11,074	919	43	33	86	27	4	9	6	5	14	2
Occidental Mindoro	72,325	7,281	533	17	13	20	13	1	15	7	2	1	1
Olongapo City	67,072	6,435	1,564	16	10	9	6	4	7	13	3	2	1
Oriental Mindoro	154,295	13,189	1,053	1	6	1	0	1	0	0	0	1	0
Ormoc City	48,455	700	269	0	0	0	0	0	0	0	0	0	0
Oroquieta City	11,457	2,522	2,337	18	55	17	6	6	10	1	3	5	4
Ozamiz City	21,080	2,767	1,836	16	29	18	8	10	6	1	9	5	1
Pagadian City	20,564	3,356	1,059	10	18	21	1	4	5	3	5	2	1
Palawan	83,646	12,790	766	23	23	40	7	3	15	6	7	10	1
Palayan City	9,685	256	34	0	0	0	3	0	0	0	0	0	0
Pampanga	340,493	28,472	6,173	136	48	40	26	12	26	30	10	16	6
Pangasinan	574,285	61,965	4,067	65	44	263	31	5	20	19	35	5	5
Parañaque	124,782	8,449	609	0	0	0	0	0	0	0	0	0	0
Pasay City	134,856	9,318	4,860	67	45	20	20	8	14	23	5	11	8
Pasig	159,577	11,767	2,705	58	58	30	31	6	22	24	16	5	6
Pateros	22,877	1,342	335	6	5	0	13	0	1	1	0	0	2
Puerto Princesa City	22,556	2,481	157	4	3	1	0	1	1	0	1	0	0
Quezon	231,831	104,766	3,712	114	108	116	42	30	54	31	39	37	14
Quezon City	580,821	48,167	19,358	460	367	216	234	74	64	195	64	97	64
Quirino	37,005	1,918	38	3	1	3	0	0	2	0	0	1	0
Rizal	201,694	26,814	4,329	93	64	42	38	113	14	27	14	12	7
Romblon	67,721	3,463	473	8	22	4	1	3	3	3	2	4	1
Roxas City	42,020	2,974	1,263	0	0	0	0	0	0	0	0	0	0
Samar	164,566	1,611	736	0	1	0	0	2	1	3	1	1	0
San Carlos City, Negros Occidental	25,470	2,636	1,844	13	10	52	0	1	1	1	4	1	2
San Carlos City, Pangasinan	35,887	3,261	166	12	2	13	0	4	8	3	5	0	2
San Jose City	26,145	3,246	225	2	3	4	0	1	0	1	1	0	0
San Juan	63,189	6,476	3,057	73	48	15	19	6	6	14	10	8	7
San Pablo City	47,568	8,950	1,341	20	34	21	6	5	9	5	6	3	4
Silay City	37,895	144	37	0	0	0	0	0	0	0	0	0	0
Siquijor	27,935	2,006	1,247	7	4	2	1	1	1	1	1	3	0
Sorsogon	129,830	45,432	1,194	40	80	56	19	14	45	11	15	87	4
South Cotabato	153,454	39,549	10,142	26	46	22	28	5	33	6	22	16	8
Southern Leyte	142,989	3,175	2,200	0	0	0	0	0	0	0	0	0	0
Sultan Kudarat	89,564	13,680	1,147	16	17	50	3	4	12	6	6	2	2
Sulu	125,976	3,748	382	19	30	22	12	17	24	10	15	18	13
Surigao City	26,388	2,767	1,965	17	12	8	3	11	7	2	3	1	0
Surigao del Norte	104,644	9,510	5,632	28	30	5	9	8	7	5	5	11	2
Surigao del Sur	92,663	20,771	12,108	84	67	69	33	36	62	15	38	32	10
Tacloban City	58,614	703	330	0	0	0	0	0	0	0	0	0	0
Tagaytay City	8,181	138	15	0	0	0	0	0	0	0	0	0	0
Tagbilaran City	15,300	822	2,818	9	12	3	3	6	1	2	1	1	1
Taguig	45,037	5,705	1,017	20	9	19	5	2	3	5	4	1	1
Tangub City	13,973	310	144	1	2	2	0	0	0	0	2	0	0
Tarlac	294,750	7,427	1,236	28	18	7	4	2	5	2	1	5	0
Tawi-Tawi	33,331	0	0	0	0	0	0	0	0	0	0	0	0
Toledo City	31,354	2,121	3,455	18	2	8	0	5	1	0	2	8	0
Trece Martires City	5,236	0	0	0	0	0	0	0	0	0	0	0	0
Valenzuela	73,320	12,458	1,860	51	23	18	15	7	10	12	10	5	2
Zambales	124,609	3,759	515	3	6	5	4	2	3	63	1	0	0
Zamboanga City	78,495	13,264	2,191	36	67	56	17	11	36	11	14	11	8
Zamboanga del Norte	97,141	8,367	3,888	16	14	10	2	6	8	4	7	3	2
Zamboanga del Sur	207,311	36,153	12,258	149	242	196	63	46	50	14	51	26	32
Total	18,309,360	1,716,449	749,845	6,499	4,955	4,224	1,954	1,945	1,740	1,421	1,234	1,185	592
Province/City													
Province/City	Marcos	Santos	Cabangbang	Manlapaz	Dajao	Valdez	Rimando	Hingpit	Morelos	Igrobay	Del Rosario	Enage	Tipanao

Votes for the provinces of Aurora and Batanes were not included as the certificates of the votes for these provinces were delivered late due to inclement weather.
