= Fourth Philippine Republic =

Filipino government (1981–1986)

Republic of the Philippines: Republika ng Pilipinas (Filipino); República de Filipinas (Spanish)
- 1981–1986
- Flag Coat of arms (1978–1985)
- Motto: "Isang Bansa, Isang Diwa" "One Nation, One Spirit" "Peace, Freedom, Justice"
- Anthem: Lupang Hinirang (English: "Chosen Land")
- Location of the Philippines in Southeast Asia.
- Capital: 1976–1986: Manila (de jure); Metro Manila (de facto)
- Largest city: Quezon City (city proper); Metro Manila (metropolitan)
- Official languages: Filipino; English; Spanish
- Government: Unitary semi-presidential republic under a conjugal dictatorship (1981–1986); Revolutionary government (1986)
- President
  - 1965–1986: Ferdinand Marcos
  - 1986: Corazon Aquino
- Vice President
  - 1972–1986: abolished by the 1973 Constitution
  - 1986: Salvador Laurel
- Prime Minister
  - 1981–1986: Cesar Virata
  - 1986: Salvador Laurel
- Legislature: Interim Batasang Pambansa (1978–1984); Regular Batasang Pambansa (1984–1986)
- History
  - Established: June 30, 1981
  - Assassination of Ninoy Aquino: August 21, 1983
  - 1986 snap election: February 7, 1986
  - People Power Revolution: February 22–25, 1986
  - Corazon Aquino inaugurated: February 25, 1986
- Currency: Philippine peso (₱)
- Time zone: UTC+08:00 (PST)
Preceded by	Succeeded by
History of the Philippines (1965–1986)	Provisional Government

The Fourth Philippine Republic, also known as the Fourth Republic of the Philippines (Tagalog: Repúbliká ng Pilipinas; Spanish: República de Filipinas), was established after Ferdinand Marcos won the 1981 Philippine presidential election and referendum. Marcos announced the beginning of the Fourth Republic on June 30, during his inauguration speech. He was also the first and only president of the Fourth Philippine Republic. On February 25, 1986, due to the People Power Revolution, Marcos went into exile in Hawaii, and Corazon Aquino became the 11th president of the Philippines. The Fourth Republic would come to an end under Aquino's leadership, and the Fifth Republic would commence with the adoption of a new constitution.

== Background ==
Marcos officially lifted martial law on January 17, 1981. However, he retained much of the government's power for arrest and detention. At the time, corruption, nepotism, as well as civil unrest contributed to a serious decline in economic growth and development under Marcos, whose own health faced obstacles due to lupus. The political opposition boycotted the 1981 presidential elections, which pitted Marcos and his Kilusang Bagong Lipunan party against retired Gen. Alejo Santos of the Nacionalista Party, in protest over his control over the results. Marcos won by a margin of over 16 million votes, which constitutionally allowed him to have another six-year term under the new Constitution that his administration crafted. Finance Minister Cesar Virata was eventually appointed to succeed Marcos as prime minister by the Batasang Pambansa.

In 1983, opposition leader Benigno "Ninoy" Aquino Jr. was assassinated at Manila International Airport upon his return to the Philippines after a long period of exile in the United States. This coalesced popular dissatisfaction with Marcos began a series of events, including pressure from the United States, that culminated in a snap presidential election on February 7, 1986. The opposition united under Aquino's widow, Corazon Aquino, and Salvador Laurel, head of the United Nationalists Democratic Organizations (UNIDO). The election was marred by widespread reports of violence and tampering with results by both sides.

The official election canvasser, the Commission on Elections (COMELEC), declared Marcos the winner, despite a walk-out staged by disenfranchised computer technicians on February 9. According to the COMELEC's final tally, Marcos won with 10,807,197 votes to Aquino's 9,291,761 votes. By contrast, the partial 70% tally of the National Citizens' Movement for Free Elections, an accredited poll watcher, said Aquino won with 7,835,070 votes to Marcos's 7,053,068.

A peaceful civilian-military uprising, now popularly called the People Power Revolution, forced Marcos into exile and installed Corazon Aquino as president on February 25, 1986. The administration of Marcos has been called by various sources as a kleptocracy and a conjugal dictatorship.

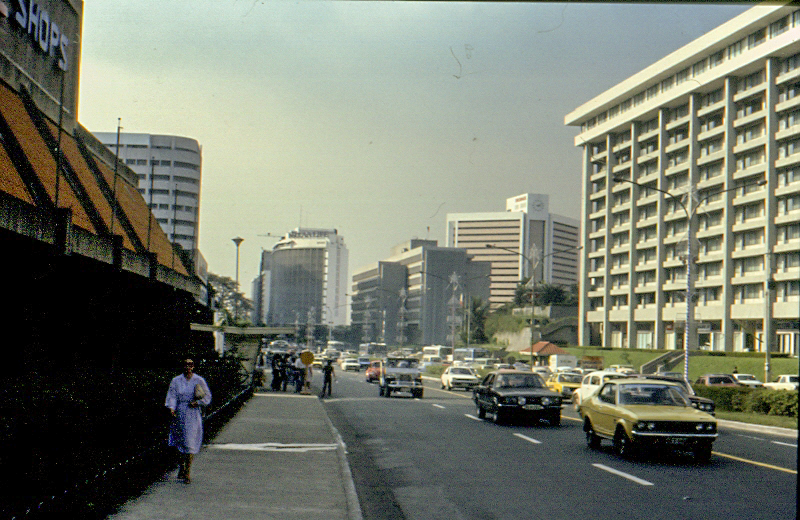
Manila in 1982

== History ==
=== 1981 presidential election ===
The 1981 Philippine presidential election and national referendum was held on June 16, 1981. President Ferdinand E. Marcos of the Kilusang Bagong Lipunan (KBL) defeated retired general and World War II veteran Alejo Santos of the Nacionalista Party in a landslide victory. Most opposition parties boycotted the election as a sign of protest over the 1978 election for the Interim Batasang Pambansa (National Assembly), which they condemned as fraudulent. At the same time, a national referendum was held on the question in holding elections for barangay elections in 1982.

Marcos's 80% margin of victory is the most lopsided Philippine presidential election ever, him getting 88% of the vote is also the largest in Philippine presidential election history, also beating Quezon's 1941 record of 82%. This is also the most votes received by a person in the Philippines for a single-winner election until 2022 when Sara Duterte won 32 million votes; for multiple-winner elections, it was beaten by Mar Roxas in 2004 with 19 million votes. This was also the presidential election with the most number of candidates, with 13, although nine candidates with the fewest votes collectively just got 0.13% of the vote.

Marcos would have served another six-year term ending in 1987, but it was cut short by the 1986 snap election that eventually resulted in his ouster in the People Power Revolution.

=== Assassination of Ninoy Aquino ===
The Assassination of Ninoy Aquino was credited with transforming the Philippine opposition to the Marcos regime from a small, isolated movement into a national crusade, incorporating people from all walks of life. The middle class got involved, the impoverished majority participated, and business leaders whom Marcos had irked during martial law endorsed the campaign—all with the crucial support of the military and the Catholic Church hierarchy. The assassination showed the increasing incapacity of the Marcos regime—Ferdinand was mortally ill when the crime occurred while his cronies mismanaged the country in his absence. It outraged Aquino's supporters that Marcos, if not masterminding it, allowed the assassination to happen and engineered its cover-up. The mass revolt caused by Aquino's demise attracted worldwide media attention and Marcos's American contacts, as well as the Reagan administration, began distancing themselves. There was a global media spotlight on the Philippine crisis, and exposes on Imelda's extravagant lifestyle (most infamously, her thousands of pairs of shoes) and "mining operations", as well as Ferdinand's excesses, came into focus.

=== End of the Fourth Republic ===
The 1986 Philippine presidential election was generally perceived to be fraudulent, both locally and internationally. The International observers, including a U.S. delegation led by Senator Richard Lugar, denounced the official results. Corazon Aquino rejected the results and held the "Tagumpay ng Bayan" (People's Victory) rally at Luneta Park on February 16, 1986, announcing a civil disobedience campaign and calling for her supporters to boycott publications and companies which were associated with Marcos or any of his cronies. The event was attended by a crowd of about two million people. Aquino's camp began making preparations for more rallies, and Aquino herself went to Cebu to rally more people to their cause.

In the aftermath of the election and the revelations of irregularities, A small contingent of Aquino supporters, led by her brother in law Butz Aquino, went to EDSA to express support the coup plotters, in the hope of preventing Marcos from annihilating them. At around the same time, Ramos and Enrile contacted the highly influential Archbishop of Manila, Cardinal Jaime Sin to ask for help. Cardinal Sin went on radio and encouraged people on the capital to likewise go to EDSA to support Ramos and Enrile, and crowds, already preparing to conduct election protests, trooped en masse to the stretch of EDSA between the two camps.

This evolved in the largely peaceful 1986 EDSA Revolution, which ended with Marcos going into exile in Hawaii and Corazon Aquino becoming the 11th president of the Philippines on February 25, 1986. Under Aquino, the Philippines would adopt a new constitution, ending the Fourth Republic and ushering in the beginning of the Fifth Republic.

By the end of the Marcos dictatorial era, the country was experiencing a debt crisis, extreme poverty, and severe underemployment.

== Government ==
=== 1981-1986 ===
Starting 1981, The Philippines was under unitary dominant-party semi-presidential republic under a conjugal dictatorship. Marcos's administration was noted for its authoritarian rule, especially under the Martial law era. Even after Marcos officially lifted martial law, he still retained all presidential decrees, legislative powers and the suspension of the privilege of the writ of habeas corpus. On 1986, A provisional revolutionary government was set up in the Philippines following the People Power Revolution which ended on February 25. The revolution removed President Ferdinand Marcos, who ruled as a dictator, from office and installed Corazon Aquino as the new president of the country.

=== 1986-1987 ===
The Provisional Government of the Philippines in 1986 to 1987 functioned as an interim provisional revolutionary government, although never was officially characterized as such. The legislative powers under the provisional government was exercised by the President with the abolishment of the Batasang Pambansa.

== Economy ==
During Marcos's declaration of Martial Law and his overthrow in the event of the 1986 People Power Revolution, the Philippine economy saw significant highs and lows.

The commodities boom continued throughout most of the 70s, only slowing down towards the early 1980s when it left the Philippine economy vulnerable to the instability of the international capital market. As a result, the economy grew amidst the two severe global oil shocks following the 1973 oil crisis and 1979 energy crisis – oil price was $3 / barrel in 1973 and $39.5 in 1979, or a growth of 1200% which drove inflation.

The Heritage Foundation pointed that when the economy began to weaken in 1979, the government did not adopt anti-recessionist policies and instead launched risky and costly industrial projects. Despite the 1984–1985 recession, GDP on a per capita basis more than tripled from $175.9 in 1965 to $565.8 in 1985 at the end of Marcos's term, though this averages less than 1.2% a year when adjusted for inflation.

The overall economy experienced a slower growth GDP per capita, lower wage conditions and higher unemployment especially towards the end of Marcos's term after the 1983–1984 recession. The Philippine peso devalued sharply from 3.9 to 20.53. The recession was triggered largely by political instability following Ninoy's assassination, high global interest rates, severe global economic recession, and significant increase in global oil price, the latter three of which affected all indebted countries in Latin America, Europe, and Asia. The Philippines was among these countries and was not exempted from the negative economic consequences.

The period is sometimes erroneously described as a golden age for the country's economy. However, by the period's end, the country was experiencing a debt crisis, extreme poverty, and severe underemployment. On the island of Negros, one-fifth of the children under six were seriously malnourished. By 1985, a survey by the National Nutrition Council estimated that about 350,000 children – 40 percent of Negros Occidental residents under the age of 14 – were suffering from malnutrition.

After the Negros famine, 1985 infant death statistics at Bacolod Hospital rose 67 percent, and Negros' infant mortality rose to nearly double the national average, with most of the deaths attributed to malnutrition.

The country's total external debt rose from US$ 2.3 billion in 1970 to US$ 26.2 billion in 1985.

== See also ==
- Negros famine
