= 1961 Philippine presidential election =

7th election of Philippine president

- November 14, 1961
- Turnout: 79.4% (▲3.9pp)
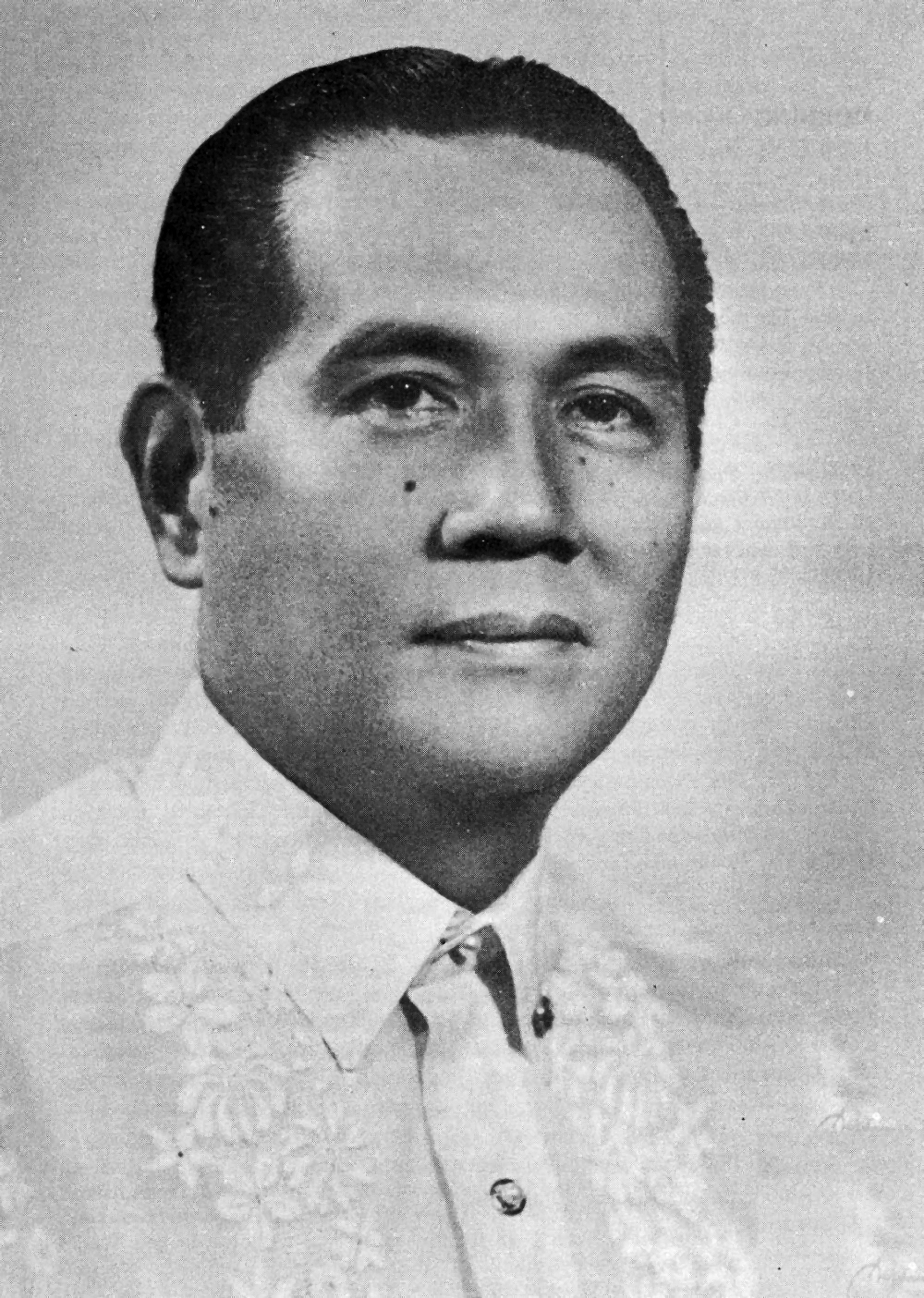

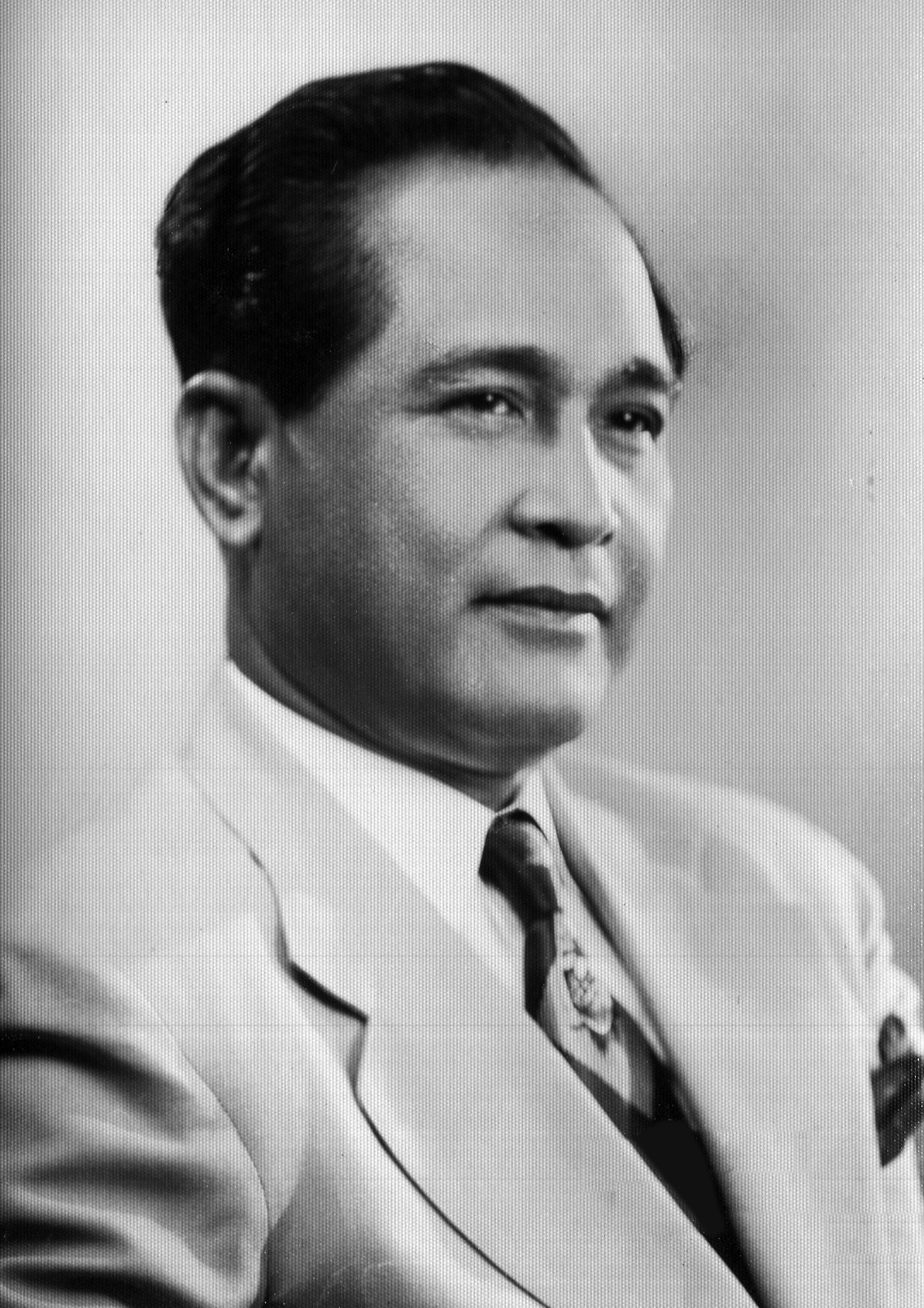
Nominee	Diosdado Macapagal	Carlos P. Garcia
Party	Liberal	Nacionalista
Running mate	Emmanuel Pelaez	Gil J. Puyat
Popular vote	3,554,840	2,902,996
Percentage	55.05%	44.95%
- Election results per province/city.
President before election
Carlos P. Garcia
Nacionalista
Elected President
Diosdado Macapagal
Liberal
- 1961 Philippine vice presidential election
- November 14, 1961
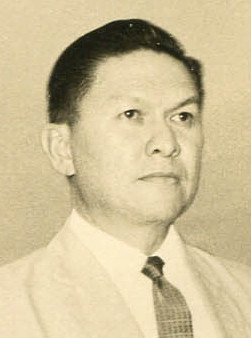

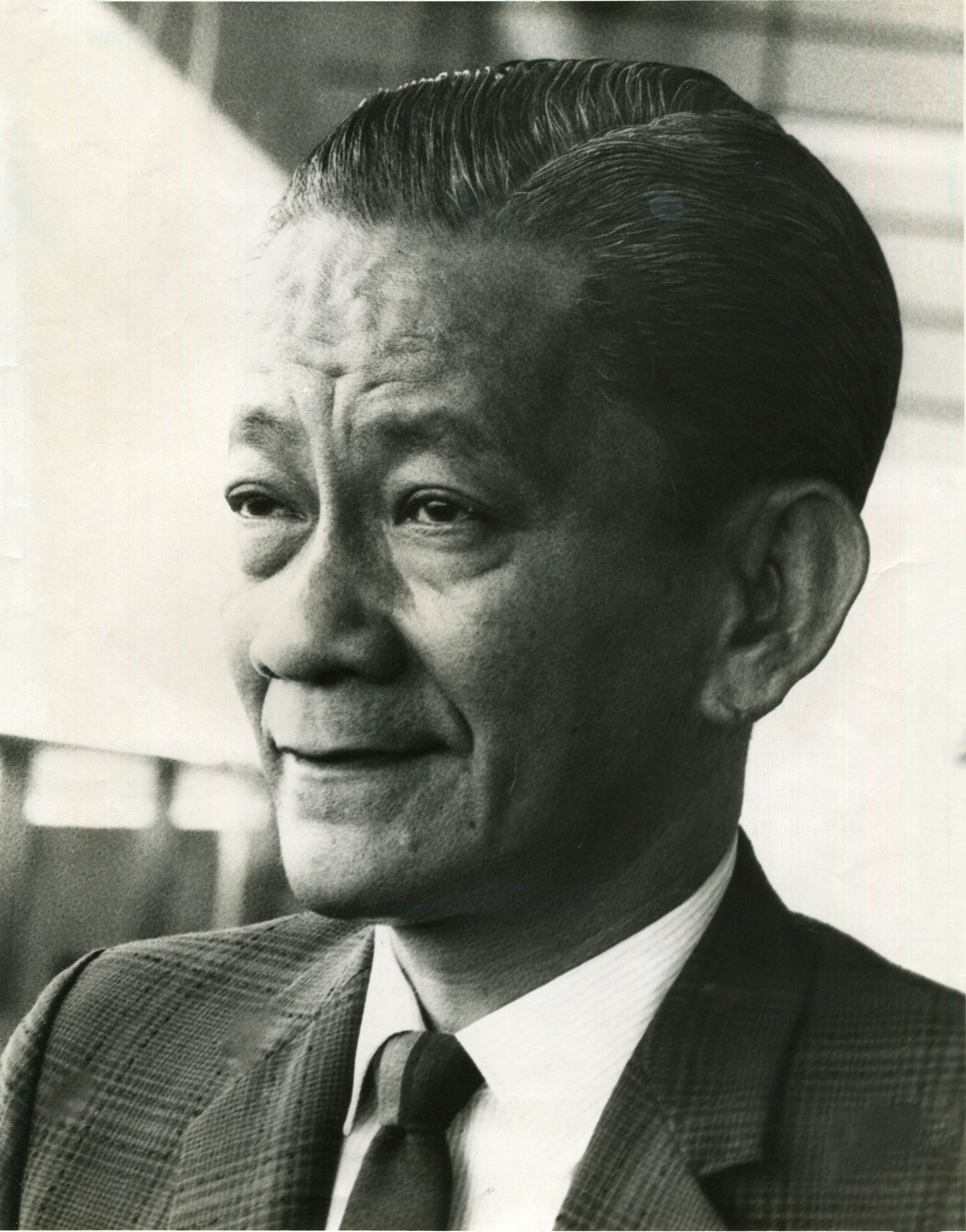

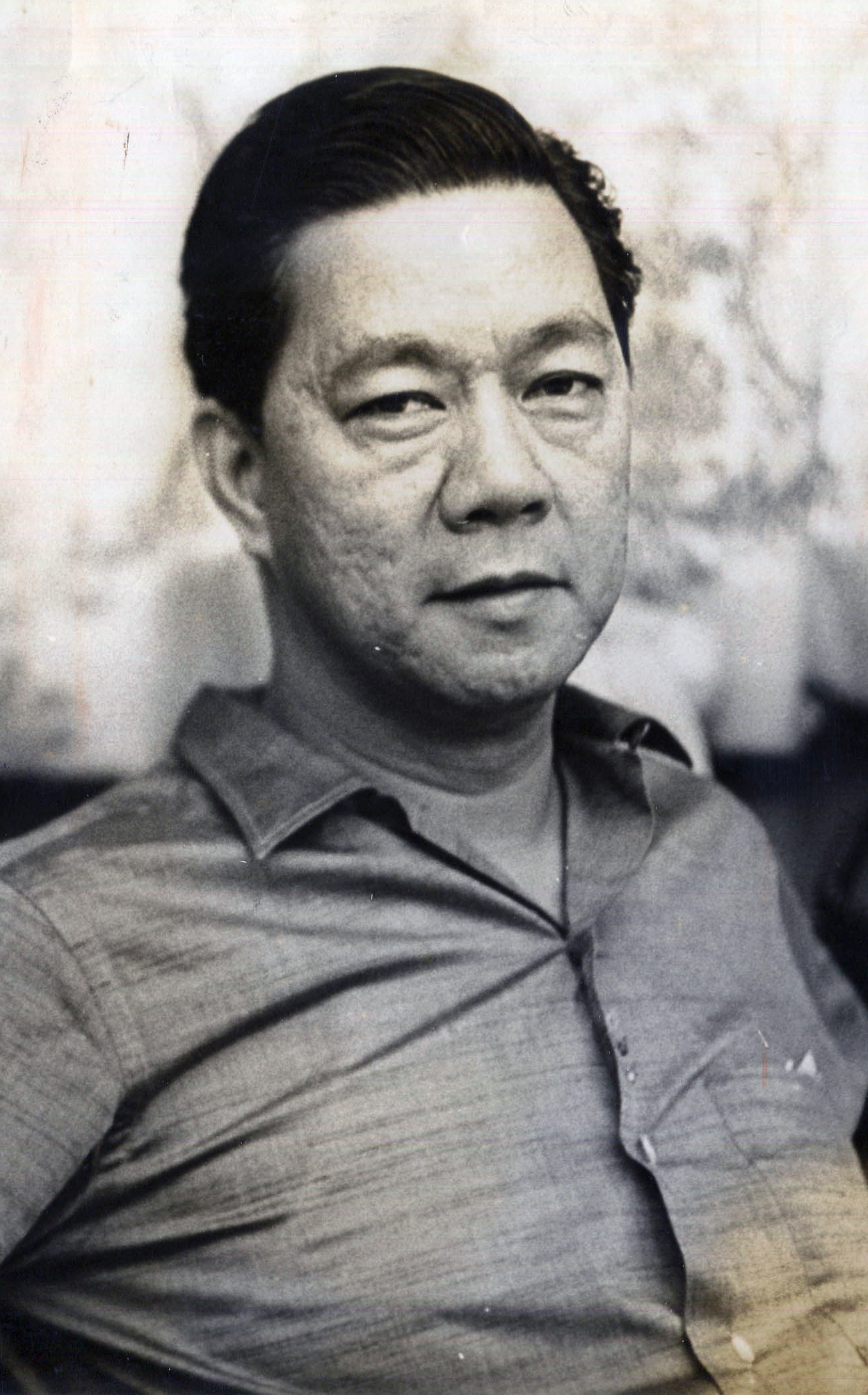
Candidate	Emmanuel Pelaez	Sergio Osmeña Jr.	Gil Puyat
Party	Liberal	Independent	Nacionalista
Popular vote	2,394,400	2,190,424	1,787,987
Percentage	37.57%	34.37%	28.06%
- Election results per province/city.
Vice President before election
Diosdado Macapagal
Liberal
Elected Vice President
Emmanuel Pelaez
Liberal

Presidential and vice presidential elections were held in the Philippines on November 14, 1961. Incumbent president Carlos P. Garcia lost his bid for a second full term to Vice President Diosdado Macapagal. His running mate, Senator Gil J. Puyat, lost to Senator Emmanuel Pelaez. Six candidates ran for president, four of whom got nine votes nationwide together. This was the only election in Philippine electoral history in which the incumbent vice president defeated the incumbent president.

== Results ==
=== President ===
Candidate	Party	Votes	%
Diosdado Macapagal	Liberal Party	3,554,840	55.05
Carlos P. Garcia (incumbent)	Nacionalista Party	2,902,996	44.95
Alfredo Abcede	Federal Party	7	0.00
German F. Villanueva	Independent	2	0.00
Gregorio L. Llanza	Independent	2	0.00
Praxedes Floro	Independent	0	0.00
Total		6,457,847	100.00
Valid votes		6,457,847	95.83
Invalid/blank votes		280,988	4.17
Total votes		6,738,835	100.00
Registered voters/turnout		8,483,568	79.43
Source: Nohlen, Grotz, Hartmann, Hasall and Santos

Popular vote
Macapagal	55.05%
Garcia	44.95%

==== Results by province and city ====
Province/City	Macapagal		Garcia		Abcede		Villanueva		Llanza		Floro	
Province/City	Votes	%	Votes	%	Votes	%	Votes	%	Votes	%	Votes	%
Abra	19,826	59.44	13,529	40.56	0	0.00	0	0.00	0	0.00	0	0.00
Agusan	25,161	46.08	29,439	53.92	0	0.00	0	0.00	0	0.00	0	0.00
Aklan	34,712	56.86	26,339	43.14	0	0.00	0	0.00	0	0.00	0	0.00
Albay	65,308	59.07	45,247	40.93	0	0.00	0	0.00	0	0.00	0	0.00
Antique	26,930	51.51	25,356	48.49	0	0.00	0	0.00	0	0.00	0	0.00
Bacolod	18,377	58.77	12,892	41.23	0	0.00	0	0.00	0	0.00	0	0.00
Baguio	10,539	67.29	5,122	32.71	0	0.00	0	0.00	0	0.00	0	0.00
Basilan	6,508	50.12	6,477	49.88	0	0.00	0	0.00	0	0.00	0	0.00
Bataan	27,282	56.87	20,694	43.13	0	0.00	0	0.00	0	0.00	0	0.00
Batanes	2,024	55.77	1,604	44.20	1	0.03	0	0.00	0	0.00	0	0.00
Batangas	89,466	52.14	82,101	47.85	5	0.00	2	0.00	1	0.00	0	0.00
Bohol	34,807	22.64	118,920	77.36	0	0.00	0	0.00	0	0.00	0	0.00
Bukidnon	17,436	46.45	20,104	53.55	0	0.00	0	0.00	0	0.00	0	0.00
Bulacan	110,970	56.65	84,917	43.35	0	0.00	0	0.00	0	0.00	0	0.00
Butuan	11,722	41.20	16,732	58.80	0	0.00	0	0.00	0	0.00	0	0.00
Cabanatuan	11,058	57.01	8,339	42.99	0	0.00	0	0.00	0	0.00	0	0.00
Cagayan	69,757	71.68	27,562	28.32	0	0.00	0	0.00	0	0.00	0	0.00
Cagayan de Oro	8,341	48.85	8,734	51.15	0	0.00	0	0.00	0	0.00	0	0.00
Calbayog	5,849	39.83	8,837	60.17	0	0.00	0	0.00	0	0.00	0	0.00
Camarines Norte	29,566	62.49	17,745	37.51	0	0.00	0	0.00	0	0.00	0	0.00
Camarines Sur	89,115	57.50	65,858	42.50	0	0.00	0	0.00	1	0.00	0	0.00
Capiz	38,309	58.36	27,336	41.64	0	0.00	0	0.00	0	0.00	0	0.00
Catanduanes	18,924	48.74	19,901	51.26	0	0.00	0	0.00	0	0.00	0	0.00
Cavite	63,852	67.33	30,976	32.67	0	0.00	0	0.00	0	0.00	0	0.00
Cavite City	9,116	65.86	4,725	34.14	0	0.00	0	0.00	0	0.00	0	0.00
Cebu	58,015	25.94	165,668	74.06	0	0.00	0	0.00	0	0.00	0	0.00
Cebu City	13,386	21.59	48,622	78.41	0	0.00	0	0.00	0	0.00	0	0.00
Cotabato	81,381	46.23	94,659	53.77	0	0.00	0	0.00	0	0.00	0	0.00
Cotabato City	4,319	61.47	2,707	38.53	0	0.00	0	0.00	0	0.00	0	0.00
Dagupan	11,652	56.63	8,922	43.37	0	0.00	0	0.00	0	0.00	0	0.00
Davao	47,829	42.37	65,063	57.63	0	0.00	0	0.00	0	0.00	0	0.00
Davao City	22,461	41.83	31,232	58.17	0	0.00	0	0.00	0	0.00	0	0.00
Dumaguete	4,302	47.52	4,751	52.48	0	0.00	0	0.00	0	0.00	0	0.00
Gingoog	5,810	63.78	3,299	36.22	0	0.00	0	0.00	0	0.00	0	0.00
Iligan	6,341	43.12	8,364	56.88	0	0.00	0	0.00	0	0.00	0	0.00
Ilocos Norte	57,004	70.15	24,251	29.85	0	0.00	0	0.00	0	0.00	0	0.00
Ilocos Sur	77,190	73.93	27,223	26.07	0	0.00	0	0.00	0	0.00	0	0.00
Iloilo	135,532	64.47	74,682	35.53	0	0.00	0	0.00	0	0.00	0	0.00
Iloilo City	23,361	47.93	25,383	52.07	0	0.00	0	0.00	0	0.00	0	0.00
Isabela	56,299	66.48	28,383	33.52	0	0.00	0	0.00	0	0.00	0	0.00
La Union	66,774	82.64	14,027	17.36	0	0.00	0	0.00	0	0.00	0	0.00
Laguna	60,981	51.98	56,337	48.02	0	0.00	0	0.00	0	0.00	0	0.00
Lanao del Norte	19,405	50.37	19,119	49.63	0	0.00	0	0.00	0	0.00	0	0.00
Lanao del Sur	29,623	40.84	42,913	59.16	0	0.00	0	0.00	0	0.00	0	0.00
Lapu-Lapu City	2,734	25.63	7,932	74.37	0	0.00	0	0.00	0	0.00	0	0.00
Legazpi	8,707	51.23	8,290	48.77	0	0.00	0	0.00	0	0.00	0	0.00
Leyte	91,728	48.52	97,338	51.48	0	0.00	0	0.00	0	0.00	0	0.00
Lipa	12,064	62.68	7,183	37.32	0	0.00	0	0.00	0	0.00	0	0.00
Lucena	7,717	64.49	4,250	35.51	0	0.00	0	0.00	0	0.00	0	0.00
Manila	174,055	59.38	119,061	40.62	0	0.00	0	0.00	0	0.00	0	0.00
Marawi	4,141	39.61	6,313	60.39	0	0.00	0	0.00	0	0.00	0	0.00
Marinduque	23,378	71.69	9,230	28.31	0	0.00	0	0.00	0	0.00	0	0.00
Masbate	36,623	53.45	31,893	46.55	0	0.00	0	0.00	0	0.00	0	0.00
Misamis Occidental	23,717	45.54	28,363	54.46	0	0.00	0	0.00	0	0.00	0	0.00
Misamis Oriental	34,948	57.53	25,795	42.47	0	0.00	0	0.00	0	0.00	0	0.00
Mountain Province	50,041	70.82	20,623	29.18	0	0.00	0	0.00	0	0.00	0	0.00
Naga	7,645	58.02	5,531	41.98	0	0.00	0	0.00	0	0.00	0	0.00
Negros Occidental	108,393	55.94	85,386	44.06	0	0.00	0	0.00	0	0.00	0	0.00
Negros Oriental	44,090	44.92	54,053	55.08	0	0.00	0	0.00	0	0.00	0	0.00
Nueva Ecija	93,416	62.19	56,790	37.81	0	0.00	0	0.00	0	0.00	0	0.00
Nueva Vizcaya	25,276	75.94	8,007	24.06	0	0.00	0	0.00	0	0.00	0	0.00
Occidental Mindoro	12,981	56.25	10,096	43.75	0	0.00	0	0.00	0	0.00	0	0.00
Oriental Mindoro	37,716	64.01	21,209	35.99	0	0.00	0	0.00	0	0.00	0	0.00
Ormoc	5,088	38.33	8,187	61.67	0	0.00	0	0.00	0	0.00	0	0.00
Ozamiz	4,992	39.45	7,662	60.55	0	0.00	0	0.00	0	0.00	0	0.00
Palawan	21,841	57.60	16,077	42.40	0	0.00	0	0.00	0	0.00	0	0.00
Pampanga	111,776	71.19	45,228	28.81	0	0.00	0	0.00	0	0.00	0	0.00
Pangasinan	181,801	59.77	122,371	40.23	0	0.00	0	0.00	0	0.00	0	0.00
Pasay	15,399	43.79	19,770	56.21	0	0.00	0	0.00	0	0.00	0	0.00
Quezon	99,441	65.08	53,364	34.92	0	0.00	0	0.00	0	0.00	0	0.00
Quezon City	42,989	59.82	28,880	40.18	0	0.00	0	0.00	0	0.00	0	0.00
Rizal	152,169	58.42	108,299	41.58	0	0.00	0	0.00	0	0.00	0	0.00
Romblon	16,452	46.29	19,092	53.71	0	0.00	0	0.00	0	0.00	0	0.00
Roxas City	8,697	60.70	5,631	39.30	0	0.00	0	0.00	0	0.00	0	0.00
Samar	91,918	54.68	76,185	45.32	0	0.00	0	0.00	0	0.00	0	0.00
San Carlos	5,255	42.39	7,142	57.61	0	0.00	0	0.00	0	0.00	0	0.00
San Pablo	13,639	64.48	7,513	35.52	0	0.00	0	0.00	0	0.00	0	0.00
Silay	7,272	57.73	5,325	42.27	0	0.00	0	0.00	0	0.00	0	0.00
Sorsogon	49,657	55.60	39,654	44.40	0	0.00	0	0.00	0	0.00	0	0.00
Southern Leyte	23,269	42.55	31,419	57.45	0	0.00	0	0.00	0	0.00	0	0.00
Sulu	28,010	59.51	19,056	40.49	0	0.00	0	0.00	0	0.00	0	0.00
Surigao del Norte	24,487	45.75	29,038	54.25	0	0.00	0	0.00	0	0.00	0	0.00
Surigao del Sur	21,353	48.93	22,290	51.07	0	0.00	0	0.00	0	0.00	0	0.00
Tacloban	7,045	45.63	8,394	54.37	0	0.00	0	0.00	0	0.00	0	0.00
Tagaytay	824	53.44	718	46.56	0	0.00	0	0.00	0	0.00	0	0.00
Tarlac	80,110	74.78	27,018	25.22	0	0.00	0	0.00	0	0.00	0	0.00
Toledo	1,390	13.41	8,973	86.59	0	0.00	0	0.00	0	0.00	0	0.00
Trece Martires	431	84.51	79	15.49	0	0.00	0	0.00	0	0.00	0	0.00
Zambales	38,620	63.30	22,388	36.70	0	0.00	0	0.00	0	0.00	0	0.00
Zamboanga City	13,671	56.31	10,605	43.69	0	0.00	0	0.00	0	0.00	0	0.00
Zamboanga del Norte	27,531	51.92	25,498	48.08	0	0.00	0	0.00	0	0.00	0	0.00
Zamboanga del Sur	33,137	47.53	36,580	52.47	0	0.00	0	0.00	0	0.00	0	0.00
Total	3,554,840	55.05	2,902,996	44.95	7	0.00	2	0.00	2	0.00	0	0.00
Source: Senate

=== Vice-President ===
Candidate	Party	Votes	%
Emmanuel Pelaez	Liberal Party	2,394,400	37.57
Sergio Osmeña Jr.	Independent	2,190,424	34.37
Gil Puyat	Nacionalista Party	1,787,987	28.06
Chencay Reyes Juta	Dominion Status Party	2	0.00
Total		6,372,813	100.00
Valid votes		6,372,813	94.57
Invalid/blank votes		365,992	5.43
Total votes		6,738,805	100.00
Registered voters/turnout		8,483,568	79.43
Source: Nohlen, Grotz, Hartmann, Hasall and Santos

Popular vote
Pelaez	37.57%
Osmeña	34.37%
Puyat	28.06%

==== Results by province and city ====
Province/City	Pelaez		Osmeña		Puyat		Juta	
Province/City	Votes	%	Votes	%	Votes	%	Votes	%
Abra	15,085	46.28	5,508	16.90	12,004	36.83	0	0.00
Agusan	22,921	42.74	17,422	32.49	13,281	24.77	0	0.00
Aklan	19,384	32.21	25,176	41.83	15,623	25.96	0	0.00
Albay	44,501	41.10	28,566	26.38	35,206	32.52	0	0.00
Antique	21,501	41.79	11,922	23.17	18,032	35.04	0	0.00
Bacolod	8,285	26.75	18,227	58.84	4,464	14.41	0	0.00
Baguio	7,572	48.46	4,774	30.55	3,280	20.99	0	0.00
Basilan	3,995	32.77	6,032	49.48	2,164	17.75	0	0.00
Bataan	16,189	34.46	16,013	34.09	14,775	31.45	0	0.00
Batanes	1,341	38.41	904	25.90	1,246	35.69	0	0.00
Batangas	40,922	23.67	72,039	41.67	59,900	34.65	0	0.00
Bohol	36,720	24.27	37,036	24.48	77,547	51.25	0	0.00
Bukidnon	17,946	48.12	11,458	30.72	7,894	21.16	0	0.00
Bulacan	83,961	43.67	53,664	27.91	54,616	28.41	0	0.00
Butuan	9,548	33.84	11,549	40.94	7,114	25.22	0	0.00
Cabanatuan	5,615	29.26	5,509	28.71	8,064	42.03	0	0.00
Cagayan	39,565	41.37	32,014	33.47	24,061	25.16	0	0.00
Cagayan de Oro	10,281	60.33	3,570	20.95	3,191	18.72	0	0.00
Calbayog	4,868	33.68	3,430	23.73	6,155	42.59	0	0.00
Camarines Norte	17,570	37.47	18,691	39.86	10,626	22.66	0	0.00
Camarines Sur	56,542	36.97	49,937	32.65	46,471	30.38	0	0.00
Capiz	31,126	48.50	10,701	16.68	22,345	34.82	0	0.00
Catanduanes	17,216	44.70	3,284	8.53	18,011	46.77	0	0.00
Cavite	42,552	44.91	36,873	38.92	15,318	16.17	0	0.00
Cavite City	5,128	36.39	7,503	53.24	1,462	10.37	0	0.00
Cebu	12,621	5.56	147,414	64.94	66,973	29.50	0	0.00
Cebu City	7,552	12.03	44,425	70.75	10,812	17.22	0	0.00
Cotabato	65,182	38.11	58,636	34.28	47,234	27.61	0	0.00
Cotabato City	3,170	45.92	2,620	37.95	1,114	16.14	0	0.00
Dagupan	9,618	47.17	3,513	17.23	7,259	35.60	0	0.00
Davao	33,852	30.18	58,751	52.38	19,567	17.44	0	0.00
Davao City	18,083	33.70	26,448	49.29	9,127	17.01	0	0.00
Dumaguete	3,663	40.69	2,469	27.43	2,870	31.88	0	0.00
Gingoog	6,357	70.37	1,838	20.35	839	9.29	0	0.00
Iligan	4,288	29.35	7,276	49.79	3,048	20.86	0	0.00
Ilocos Norte	39,054	48.44	15,883	19.70	25,690	31.86	0	0.00
Ilocos Sur	59,742	58.26	15,164	14.79	27,632	26.95	0	0.00
Iloilo	84,467	40.97	88,188	42.77	33,528	16.26	0	0.00
Iloilo City	18,273	37.66	10,741	22.13	19,511	40.21	0	0.00
Isabela	31,109	37.16	31,317	37.40	21,298	25.44	2	0.00
La Union	38,352	47.85	33,621	41.95	8,175	10.20	0	0.00
Laguna	29,791	25.14	56,628	47.78	32,101	27.08	0	0.00
Lanao del Norte	15,855	42.50	14,802	39.68	6,651	17.83	0	0.00
Lanao del Sur	14,189	21.55	15,638	23.75	36,022	54.70	0	0.00
Lapu-Lapu City	1,028	9.78	7,613	72.46	1,866	17.76	0	0.00
Legazpi	7,282	43.39	3,373	20.10	6,126	36.51	0	0.00
Leyte	74,439	40.08	37,429	20.15	73,861	39.77	0	0.00
Lipa	4,840	25.48	8,967	47.20	5,192	27.33	0	0.00
Lucena	3,994	32.79	5,616	46.10	2,571	21.11	0	0.00
Manila	129,595	44.04	125,607	42.68	39,067	13.28	0	0.00
Marawi	1,532	15.94	3,088	32.12	4,993	51.94	0	0.00
Marinduque	9,765	30.38	16,709	51.99	5,664	17.62	0	0.00
Masbate	19,800	29.60	34,886	52.15	12,211	18.25	0	0.00
Misamis Occidental	24,246	47.21	13,341	25.98	13,770	26.81	0	0.00
Misamis Oriental	41,825	69.65	8,233	13.71	9,988	16.63	0	0.00
Mountain Province	28,704	42.06	22,750	33.34	16,786	24.60	0	0.00
Naga	4,474	34.03	6,413	48.78	2,259	17.18	0	0.00
Negros Occidental	58,337	30.87	86,671	45.86	43,966	23.27	0	0.00
Negros Oriental	32,033	33.15	25,515	26.41	39,080	40.44	0	0.00
Nueva Ecija	54,144	36.87	41,976	28.58	50,744	34.55	0	0.00
Nueva Vizcaya	10,060	30.50	19,220	58.27	3,705	11.23	0	0.00
Occidental Mindoro	9,803	43.21	6,902	30.43	5,980	26.36	0	0.00
Oriental Mindoro	21,063	36.53	25,135	43.59	11,462	19.88	0	0.00
Ormoc	4,048	30.64	4,800	36.33	4,365	33.04	0	0.00
Ozamiz	5,219	41.45	4,972	39.49	2,399	19.05	0	0.00
Palawan	14,094	38.17	11,356	30.75	11,477	31.08	0	0.00
Pampanga	61,664	39.80	12,978	8.38	80,303	51.83	0	0.00
Pangasinan	146,375	48.53	52,036	17.25	103,228	34.22	0	0.00
Pasay	10,368	29.58	19,202	54.78	5,483	15.64	0	0.00
Quezon	61,895	40.49	47,020	30.76	43,939	28.75	0	0.00
Quezon City	32,334	44.90	28,816	40.01	10,868	15.09	0	0.00
Rizal	100,657	38.86	107,818	41.63	50,536	19.51	0	0.00
Romblon	15,428	43.61	2,626	7.42	17,325	48.97	0	0.00
Roxas City	7,329	51.92	1,838	13.02	4,949	35.06	0	0.00
Samar	69,558	42.44	32,672	19.93	61,670	37.63	0	0.00
San Carlos	1,834	14.95	7,711	62.84	2,725	22.21	0	0.00
San Pablo	5,364	24.79	11,849	54.75	4,429	20.46	0	0.00
Silay	5,189	43.41	3,920	32.79	2,845	23.80	0	0.00
Sorsogon	34,453	39.20	23,703	26.97	29,740	33.84	0	0.00
Southern Leyte	19,469	36.12	21,159	39.25	13,278	24.63	0	0.00
Sulu	14,803	36.21	14,229	34.80	11,851	28.99	0	0.00
Surigao del Norte	22,720	43.27	12,675	24.14	17,111	32.59	0	0.00
Surigao del Sur	19,115	44.94	12,693	29.84	10,722	25.21	0	0.00
Tacloban	6,659	43.55	1,526	9.98	7,105	46.47	0	0.00
Tagaytay	578	37.29	794	51.23	178	11.48	0	0.00
Tarlac	50,362	47.72	31,544	29.89	23,630	22.39	0	0.00
Toledo	444	4.26	5,038	48.33	4,943	47.41	0	0.00
Trece Martires	175	34.79	300	59.64	28	5.57	0	0.00
Zambales	20,132	33.27	27,445	45.36	12,927	21.37	0	0.00
Zamboanga City	10,612	44.79	6,980	29.46	6,100	25.75	0	0.00
Zamboanga del Norte	15,538	29.79	23,824	45.68	12,791	24.53	0	0.00
Zamboanga del Sur	25,266	36.94	29,847	43.64	13,280	19.42	0	0.00
Total	2,394,400	37.57	2,190,424	34.37	1,787,987	28.06	2	0.00
Source: Senate

== See also ==
- Commission on Elections
- Politics of the Philippines
- Philippine elections
- President of the Philippines
- 5th Congress of the Philippines
