= Bartolome Cabangbang =

Filipino soldier, war hero and politician

The Honorable Bartolome C. Cabangbang
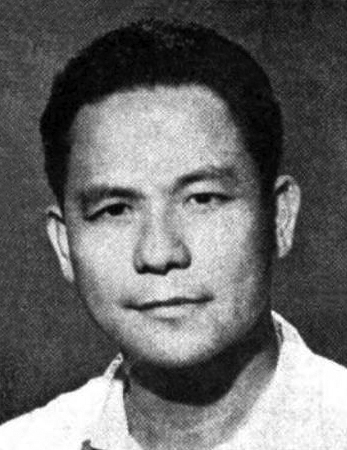
- Cabangbang's official portrait during the 3rd Congress

Member of the Interim Batasang Pambansa
- In office June 12, 1978 – June 5, 1984
- Constituency: Region VII

Member of the House of Representatives from Bohol's 2nd district
- In office December 30, 1953 – December 30, 1965
- Preceded by: Simeon Toribio
- Succeeded by: Jose Zafra

Personal details
- Born: October 23, 1917 Tubigon, Bohol, Philippine Islands
- Died: September 12, 1985 (aged 67) Loon, Bohol, Philippines
- Party: Federal (1981); Pusyon Bisaya (1978–1984); Nacionalista (1949–1978)
- Education: Philippine Military Academy; Far Eastern University (LL.B)
- Occupation: Politician
- Profession: Soldier, lawyer

Military service
- Branch/service: United States Air Force; Bureau of Constabulary; United States Marine Corps; Philippine Army Air Corps
- Rank: Colonel (Philippines); Major (United States)
- Unit: 6th Pursuit Squadron; 4th Marine Regiment; Allied Intelligence Bureau; Bulacan Military Area
- Battles/wars: World War II; Battle of the Philippines; Battle of Corregidor; Battle of Luzon
- Awards: Silver Star; Legion of Merit

Bartolome Constancia Cabangbang (23 October 1917 – 12 September 1985) was a Filipino soldier, war hero and politician who served as a member of the Philippine House of Representatives on behalf of the province of Bohol. He was also a candidate for President of the Federal Party, and campaigned for the Philippines to become the 51st state of the United States of America during the 1981 presidential elections, but lost to reelectionist incumbent Ferdinand Marcos.

== Early life ==
Cabangbang was born to a family of impoverished tenant farmers in Bohol. In 1936, he entered the newly-established Philippine Military Academy (PMA) in Baguio to pursue a free college education, and was among the members of its pioneer class in 1940.

== Wartime service ==
After graduating from the PMA, Cabangbang became a fighter pilot for the Philippine Army Air Corps, the predecessor of the Philippine Air Force, and was assigned to the 6th Pursuit Squadron led by Captain Jesus Villamor. Upon the outbreak of the Pacific War in December 1941 during World War II, Cabangbang, along with other pilots, lost their aircraft to Japanese bombing raids and were redeployed instead to Corregidor for land duties. While assigned to the 4th US Marines during the Battle of Corregidor, he was awarded a Silver Star for rescuing comrades who had been buried by debris displaced by Japanese shelling.

After the fall of Corregidor on 6 May 1942, he was among several POWs who were interned at Camp O'Donnell in Capas, Tarlac, where he witnessed Japanese atrocities against his fellow inmates. He was imprisoned for seven months before agreeing to join the Japanese-sponsored Bureau of Constabulary. But after completing his training, he escaped to Bohol and joined the guerrilla movement.

In 1943, Cabangbang was recruited by Villamor to work for the Allied Intelligence Bureau. After serving under Villamor's command in the guerrilla movement in Negros, Cabangbang was sent to Australia via the submarine Cabrilla for training. He returned to the Philippines via submarine in July 1944 and was dispatched to the eastern seaboard of Luzon, where he joined the Bulacan Military Area guerrilla unit led by Captain Alejo Santos. Cabangbang was responsible for setting up an extensive network of clandestine radio posts across Central Luzon which transmitted intelligence reports to General Douglas MacArthur's headquarters in Australia and enabled Allied forces to liberate Luzon in 1945. He also helped mediate between Santos' group and the Hukbalahap that ended fighting between the two guerrilla groups.

As a reward, MacArthur named him his direct agent, promoted him to captain and nominated him for the Distinguished Service Cross. He was eventually awarded the Legion of Merit.

== Postwar career ==
After the war, Cabangbang served in the U.S. Air Force and took training courses in San Angelo, Texas, and in Phoenix, Arizona. He resigned from the military with the rank of major in 1947 and returned to a now-independent Philippines, where he attained the rank of colonel in the Philippine Air Force.

Cabangbang started his civilian career as deputy head of the Civil Aviation Administration and operations manager of Manila International Airport, then located in Nichols Field. However, he later resigned after accusing his superiors in the Department of Public Works and Communications of corruption. Thereafter he entered politics and campaigned for Jose P. Laurel when he unsuccessfully ran for President in the 1949 elections, despite Laurel being the Japanese-installed President of the Second Philippine Republic during the war. Cabangbang himself, who ran for Congress as representative of his native Bohol, narrowly lost.

Cabangbang then entered private business and with the help of a PMA classmate, set up an airline company that smuggled high-duty items to the Philippines. He justified his actions by saying that he became "a smuggler to avoid becoming a thief".

== Congress ==
Cabangbang's earnings from his business enabled him to fund his successful campaign to represent the 2nd district of Bohol in the House of Representatives during the 1953 elections as a candidate of the Nacionalista Party. He served until 1965.

During his tenure in Congress, he finished his law degree at the Far Eastern University and also worked as a pilot for Philippine Airlines. His influence grew upon the accession of fellow Boholano Carlos P. Garcia as President, upon which Cabangbang became regarded as his representative in Congress. As Chairman of the House Defense Committee, he announced the discovery of a planned coup d'état against President Garcia by military officers associated with his predecessor, Ramon Magsaysay, in 1958. The incident led to the removal of Armed Forces of the Philippines Chief of Staff Lt. Gen. Alfonso Arellano and Defense Secretary Jesus Vargas, who was replaced by Cabangbang's guerrilla comrade Alejo Santos.

During the 1965 elections, Cabangbang unsuccessfully sought the Nacionalista Party's vice-presidential nomination, losing to Fernando Lopez. Instead, he was included in the party's senatorial lineup but lost again. In 1966, President Ferdinand Marcos appointed Cabangbang to head the Presidential Agency on Reforms and Government Operations (PARGO), which was tasked with investigating government corruption. However, he later resigned after Marcos blocked investigations into his cronies. Nevertheless, he ran again for the Senate in the 1969 elections as a Nacionalista candidate but lost again.

In 1978, Cabangbang was elected to the Interim Batasang Pambansa as a candidate of the opposition Pusyon Bisaya, which swept all 13 seats reserved for Region VII (Central Visayas). He served until 1984.

== Statehood USA Movement and the 1981 Presidential Election ==
After his loss in the Senate race in 1969, Cabangbang began advocating for the annexation of the Philippines as the 51st state of the United States of America. He founded the Statehood USA Movement as its secretary-general, and claimed to have gained a membership of 5.5 million before the declaration of martial law by President Marcos in 1972 forced the movement to disband. He defended his position saying that statehood would bring prosperity to the country and end corruption and the communist rebellion.

In 1981, while serving as an assemblyman, he ran for President as a candidate of the Federal Party in elections held on 16 June, running against his former comrade, Alejo Santos of the Nacionalista Party and reelectionist President Ferdinand Marcos, who had established his own Kilusang Bagong Lipunan party. Among his campaign promises were to hold a plebiscite on the annexation of the Philippines to the U.S. as its 51st state and a $1,000 per month minimum salary. He, along with Santos, lost to Marcos, winning only 4% of total votes versus Marcos's 88%.

After his loss, Cabangbang continued to advocate for Philippine admission into the Union, reviving the Statehood USA Movement following the assassination of Ninoy Aquino in 1983 and claiming to have regained 5,000 members while setting up chapters in eight U.S. states.

== Death ==
Cabangbang died from a cerebral hemorrhage in a hospital in Loon, Bohol on 12 September 1985. Despite his opposition to Marcos, he was given a state funeral at Armed Forces of the Philippines headquarters in Camp Aguinaldo, Quezon City, which was arranged by his classmates at the PMA. His eulogy was delivered by Marcos' cousin, acting AFP Chief of Staff Lieutenant General Fidel Ramos. A street in Caloocan was later named after him.
