= 1981 Philippine presidential election and referendum =

10th election of Philippine president

1981 Philippine presidential election
- June 16, 1981
- Turnout: 80.9% (▲1.3pp)
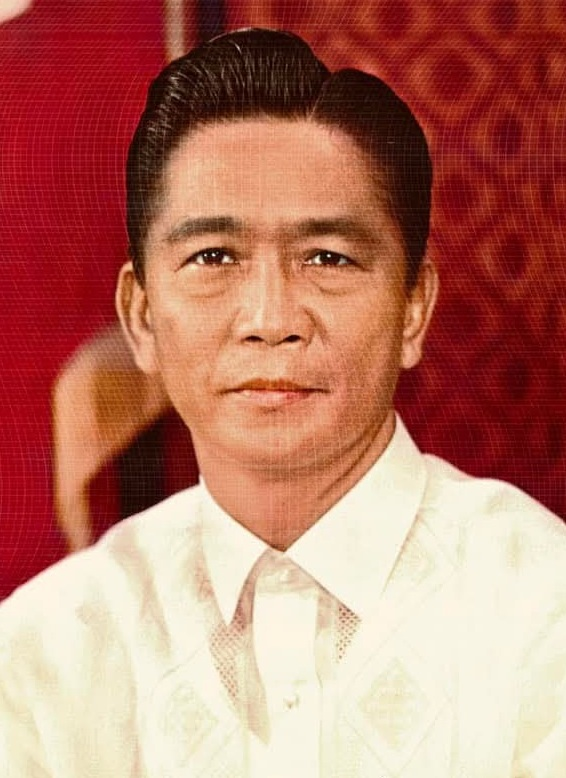

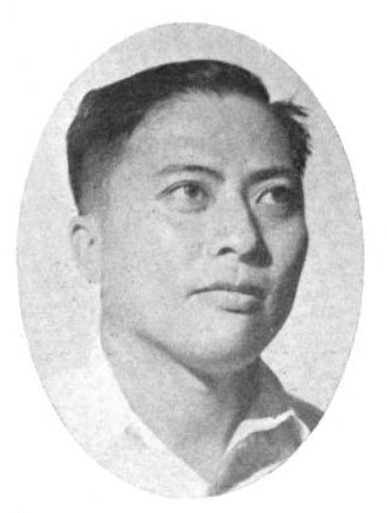
Candidate	Ferdinand Marcos	Alejo Santos
Party	KBL	Nacionalista
Popular vote	18,309,360	1,716,449
Percentage	88.02%	8.25%
President before election
Ferdinand Marcos
KBL
Elected President
Ferdinand Marcos
KBL
- 1981 Philippine referendum
- June 16, 1981
- Should there be barangay elections right after the presidential elections?
- Outcome: Proposal carried

Results
Choice	Votes	%
Yes	16,268,523	81.09%
No	3,793,322	18.91%
Valid votes	20,061,845	91.84%
Invalid or blank votes	1,781,984	8.16%
Total votes	21,843,829	100.00%

A presidential election and a national referendum were held in the Philippines on June 16, 1981. It was the first time an election was held 12 years after the presidential election in 1969, the declaration of martial law on September 21, 1972 and under the 1973 constitution. Incumbent President Ferdinand E. Marcos of the Kilusang Bagong Lipunan (KBL) defeated retired general and World War II veteran Alejo Santos of the Nacionalista Party in a landslide victory. Most opposition parties boycotted the election as a sign of protest over the election in 1978 for the Interim Batasang Pambansa (National Assembly), which they condemned as fraudulent. At the same time, a national referendum was held on the question in holding barangay elections in 1982.

Marcos' 80% margin of victory is the most lopsided presidential election ever, beating out Manuel L. Quezon's landslide victory of 82% in 1941. Marcos getting 88% of the vote is also the largest in Philippine presidential election history, also beating Quezon's 1941 record of 82%. This is also the most votes received by a person in the Philippines for a single-winner election until 2022 when Sara Duterte won 32 million votes; for multiple-winner elections, it was beaten by Mar Roxas in 2004 with 19 million votes. This was also the presidential election with the most number of candidates, with 13, although nine candidates with the fewest votes collectively just got 0.13% of the vote.

Marcos would have served another six-year term ending in 1987, but it was cut short by the 1986 snap election that eventually resulted in his ouster in the People Power Revolution. This was the most recent presidential election where an incumbent President won re-election.

== Lifting of martial law ==
On January 17, 1981, President Marcos announced the lifting of martial law via Proclamation No. 2045; in his address, he also inaugurated the "New Republic." Although martial law was ended, Marcos retained all presidential decrees, legislative powers and the suspension of the privilege of the writ of habeas corpus. The lifting of martial law was speculated to be due to the election of U.S. President Ronald Reagan, with whom Marcos wanted to have a close relationship, and who was to be inaugurated only three days later, and the arrival of Pope John Paul II in the country. In February, the Interim Batasang Pambansa (parliament) passed a constitutional amendment that changed the parliamentary system of government to a semi-presidential modeled on that of France. The electorate approved the amendment in a plebiscite held in April. Marcos then called for a presidential election to be scheduled in June.

== Campaign ==
The opposition, as early as April, had decided to boycott the election. The United Nationalist Democratic Organization (UNIDO), the main opposition umbrella group, wanted to clean the voters' list, a revamping of the Commission on Elections, a campaign to be held nationwide and that UNIDO accredited as a minority party. Marcos did not accept the demands which led UNIDO to call for a boycott. This caused for Marcos to be reportedly dismayed as he could not legitimize the election without a viable opposition candidate. UNIDO also refused to participate as Benigno Aquino Jr. (who was in exile in Massachusetts) was not allowed to participate since only people fifty years old or older were allowed to participate (Aquino was 48 years old at the time).

Marcos instructed Nacionalista Party president Jose Roy to find a token candidate to oppose him. The Nacionalista Party was then a moribund political entity because Marcos, who was elected twice before under its banner, had alternately lured and coerced the vast majority its members to his new Kilusang Bagong Lipunan. The Nacionalista Party chose former Defense Secretary and Bulacan governor Alejo Santos as their standard bearer. Santos, who was appointed by Marcos as chairman of the board of the Philippine Veterans Bank, had Francisco Tatad, Marcos' former information minister, as his campaign manager. The other main candidate was Bartolome Cabangbang of the Federal Party, whose platform was for the Philippines to become the 51st state of the United States.

With UNIDO pressing for a boycott, the government issued a statement that abstention was a mortal sin; the Archbishop of Manila, Cardinal Jaime Sin responded that the people "were free to exercise their moral judgment whether to vote or not." Those who did not vote on the April plebiscite were issued summons to force them to vote.

== Results ==
=== Presidential election ===
Marcos won in every province and city canvassed by the Batasang Pambansa. Marcos' vote totals wouldn't be surpassed until 2022, when his son Bongbong won the presidency.

Marcos won overwhelmingly, but with people remembering the American colonial era and wanting a change from the martial law conditions, Cabangbang surprisingly got 4% of the vote.

Candidate	Party	Votes	%
Ferdinand Marcos (incumbent)	Kilusang Bagong Lipunan	18,309,360	88.02
Alejo Santos	Nacionalista Party (Roy wing) (Note: Santos ran under Jose Roy's wing of the Nacionalista Party, while the rest of the party boycotted the election.)	1,716,449	8.25
Bartolome Cabangbang	Federal Party	749,845	3.60
Delfin R. Manapaz	Independent	6,499	0.03
Ursula C. Dajao	Independent	4,955	0.02
Benito L. Valdez	Independent	4,224	0.02
Lope B. Rimando	Independent	1,954	0.01
Lucio A. Hinigpit	Sovereign Citizen Party	1,945	0.01
Pacifico S. Morelos	Independent	1,740	0.01
Jose C. Igrobay	Independent	1,421	0.01
Simeon G. del Rosario	Independent	1,234	0.01
Salvador Q. Enage	Independent	1,185	0.01
Florencio Z. Tipano	Independent	592	0.00
Total		20,801,403	100.00
Valid votes		20,801,403	95.23
Invalid/blank votes		1,042,426	4.77
Total votes		21,843,829	100.00
Registered voters/turnout		26,986,451	80.94
Source: Nohlen, Grotz, Hartmann, Hasall and Santos

Popular vote
Marcos	88.02%
Santos	8.25%
Others	3.73%

==== Results by province and city ====
Province/City	Marcos		Santos		Cabangbang		Manapaz		Dajao		Valdez		Rimando		Hingpit		Morelos		Igrobay		Del Rosario		Enage		Tipanao	
Province/City	Votes	%	Votes	%	Votes	%	Votes	%	Votes	%	Votes	%	Votes	%	Votes	%	Votes	%	Votes	%	Votes	%	Votes	%	Votes	%
Abra	85,633	99.58	302	0.35	53	0.06	0	0.00	1	0.00	0	0.00	0	0.00	0	0.00	0	0.00	0	0.00	1	0.00	0	0.00	0	0.00
Agusan del Norte	48,920	62.08	28,264	35.87	1,449	1.84	30	0.04	18	0.02	22	0.03	8	0.01	68	0.09	7	0.01	0	0.00	1	0.00	5	0.01	4	0.01
Agusan del Sur	115,080	88.86	12,179	9.40	2,074	1.60	21	0.02	25	0.02	10	0.01	5	0.00	79	0.06	6	0.00	3	0.00	4	0.00	11	0.01	3	0.00
Aklan	152,479	98.59	1,855	1.20	301	0.19	8	0.01	0	0.00	10	0.01	0	0.00	0	0.00	0	0.00	0	0.00	2	0.00	0	0.00	0	0.00
Albay	182,609	78.44	46,491	19.97	3,122	1.34	88	0.04	92	0.04	130	0.06	35	0.02	74	0.03	37	0.02	44	0.02	43	0.02	29	0.01	11	0.00
Angeles City	49,429	80.32	8,574	13.93	3,368	5.47	27	0.04	75	0.12	12	0.02	13	0.02	6	0.01	14	0.02	3	0.00	7	0.01	6	0.01	3	0.00
Antique	169,359	99.40	682	0.40	330	0.19	2	0.00	0	0.00	0	0.00	0	0.00	0	0.00	0	0.00	14	0.01	0	0.00	0	0.00	0	0.00
Aurora	—	—	—	—	—	—	—	—	—	—	—	—	—	—	—	—	—	—	—	—	—	—	—	—	—	—
Bacolod	161,855	99.41	452	0.28	504	0.31	0	0.00	0	0.00	0	0.00	0	0.00	0	0.00	0	0.00	0	0.00	0	0.00	0	0.00	0	0.00
Bago	44,845	99.50	169	0.37	58	0.13	0	0.00	0	0.00	0	0.00	0	0.00	0	0.00	0	0.00	0	0.00	0	0.00	0	0.00	0	0.00
Baguio	59,339	86.59	5,836	8.52	3,048	4.45	31	0.05	57	0.08	38	0.06	122	0.18	9	0.01	13	0.02	8	0.01	13	0.02	5	0.01	7	0.01
Bais	16,357	85.80	791	4.15	1,895	9.94	6	0.03	5	0.03	0	0.00	0	0.00	1	0.01	3	0.02	2	0.01	2	0.01	1	0.01	0	0.00
Basilan	51,544	86.60	5,820	9.78	2,081	3.50	10	0.02	15	0.03	16	0.03	5	0.01	2	0.00	7	0.01	1	0.00	7	0.01	4	0.01	9	0.02
Bataan	115,133	86.62	14,559	10.95	1,646	1.24	1,376	1.04	30	0.02	82	0.06	19	0.01	10	0.01	21	0.02	16	0.01	17	0.01	6	0.00	4	0.00
Batanes	—	—	—	—	—	—	—	—	—	—	—	—	—	—	—	—	—	—	—	—	—	—	—	—	—	—
Batangas	323,158	86.89	43,811	11.78	4,456	1.20	126	0.03	86	0.02	84	0.02	44	0.01	32	0.01	30	0.01	31	0.01	29	0.01	12	0.00	9	0.00
Batangas City	50,576	89.46	4,863	8.60	1,016	1.80	13	0.02	12	0.02	12	0.02	6	0.01	6	0.01	7	0.01	10	0.02	8	0.01	3	0.01	4	0.01
Benguet	83,277	83.19	15,464	15.45	1,107	1.11	30	0.03	73	0.07	48	0.05	31	0.03	10	0.01	29	0.03	9	0.01	9	0.01	15	0.01	7	0.01
Bohol	276,407	84.09	18,639	5.67	33,517	10.20	39	0.01	18	0.01	33	0.01	2	0.00	11	0.00	15	0.00	4	0.00	4	0.00	7	0.00	4	0.00
Bukidnon	165,234	81.95	15,910	7.89	19,896	9.87	75	0.04	127	0.06	153	0.08	41	0.02	34	0.02	62	0.03	10	0.00	25	0.01	37	0.02	20	0.01
Bulacan	351,042	75.37	110,607	23.75	3,823	0.82	87	0.02	65	0.01	17	0.00	29	0.01	10	0.00	24	0.01	27	0.01	9	0.00	8	0.00	10	0.00
Butuan	39,317	59.02	25,315	38.00	1,455	2.18	27	0.04	25	0.04	18	0.03	4	0.01	413	0.62	29	0.04	0	0.00	2	0.00	7	0.01	1	0.00
Cabanatuan	58,547	90.24	5,712	8.80	612	0.94	3	0.00	2	0.00	0	0.00	2	0.00	0	0.00	0	0.00	1	0.00	0	0.00	0	0.00	1	0.00
Cadiz	59,488	99.62	157	0.26	72	0.12	0	0.00	0	0.00	0	0.00	0	0.00	0	0.00	0	0.00	0	0.00	0	0.00	0	0.00	0	0.00
Cagayan	311,783	97.27	8,166	2.55	467	0.15	18	0.01	36	0.01	35	0.01	15	0.00	6	0.00	11	0.00	1	0.00	4	0.00	3	0.00	2	0.00
Cagayan de Oro	70,172	82.06	6,593	7.71	8,453	9.88	41	0.05	64	0.07	79	0.09	13	0.02	31	0.04	15	0.02	11	0.01	16	0.02	15	0.02	12	0.01
Calbayog	38,485	93.77	2,129	5.19	399	0.97	6	0.01	2	0.00	0	0.00	0	0.00	0	0.00	0	0.00	21	0.05	0	0.00	2	0.00	0	0.00
Caloocan	256,048	93.99	10,813	3.97	5,406	1.98	42	0.02	22	0.01	21	0.01	16	0.01	2	0.00	17	0.01	16	0.01	10	0.00	4	0.00	8	0.00
Camarines Norte	40,293	57.18	28,136	39.93	1,716	2.44	96	0.14	55	0.08	65	0.09	15	0.02	14	0.02	18	0.03	12	0.02	28	0.04	13	0.02	10	0.01
Camarines Sur	226,582	72.24	85,002	27.10	1,722	0.55	55	0.02	111	0.04	53	0.02	31	0.01	13	0.00	33	0.01	13	0.00	26	0.01	17	0.01	13	0.00
Camiguin	21,308	90.95	1,396	5.96	701	2.99	4	0.02	2	0.01	2	0.01	0	0.00	6	0.03	2	0.01	1	0.00	0	0.00	2	0.01	3	0.01
Canlaon	10,246	91.78	528	4.73	384	3.44	4	0.04	1	0.01	0	0.00	0	0.00	0	0.00	0	0.00	0	0.00	0	0.00	1	0.01	0	0.00
Capiz	230,033	96.15	6,900	2.88	2,300	0.96	0	0.00	0	0.00	2	0.00	0	0.00	0	0.00	4	0.00	0	0.00	1	0.00	12	0.01	0	0.00
Catanduanes	46,485	63.33	26,877	36.62	28	0.04	2	0.00	1	0.00	5	0.01	0	0.00	0	0.00	1	0.00	0	0.00	0	0.00	1	0.00	0	0.00
Cavite	303,187	99.16	2,113	0.69	386	0.13	3	0.00	8	0.00	7	0.00	10	0.00	6	0.00	16	0.01	4	0.00	4	0.00	6	0.00	4	0.00
Cavite City	38,822	84.80	5,567	12.16	1,323	2.89	11	0.02	13	0.03	7	0.02	11	0.02	0	0.00	5	0.01	10	0.02	7	0.02	2	0.00	1	0.00
Cebu	503,905	90.91	23,998	4.33	26,111	4.71	96	0.02	49	0.01	39	0.01	14	0.00	23	0.00	27	0.00	8	0.00	16	0.00	12	0.00	6	0.00
Cebu City	248,385	86.39	20,190	7.02	18,774	6.53	2	0.00	94	0.03	72	0.03	0	0.00	2	0.00	0	0.00	4	0.00	0	0.00	0	0.00	1	0.00
Cotabato City	25,795	83.37	4,201	13.58	800	2.59	5	0.02	109	0.35	16	0.05	6	0.02	1	0.00	2	0.01	3	0.01	1	0.00	3	0.01	0	0.00
Dagupan	36,729	85.99	5,262	12.32	671	1.57	5	0.01	5	0.01	28	0.07	2	0.00	0	0.00	0	0.00	3	0.01	4	0.01	1	0.00	1	0.00
Danao	51,408	99.71	95	0.18	53	0.10	0	0.00	0	0.00	0	0.00	0	0.00	0	0.00	0	0.00	0	0.00	0	0.00	0	0.00	0	0.00
Dapitan	19,528	88.67	1,828	8.30	654	2.97	5	0.02	4	0.02	0	0.00	1	0.00	0	0.00	0	0.00	1	0.00	1	0.00	0	0.00	0	0.00
Davao City	112,838	51.51	6,970	3.18	98,835	45.12	55	0.03	94	0.04	83	0.04	45	0.02	41	0.02	26	0.01	16	0.01	24	0.01	16	0.01	9	0.00
Davao del Norte	158,528	57.98	8,234	3.01	106,151	38.83	58	0.02	124	0.05	85	0.03	61	0.02	41	0.01	45	0.02	11	0.00	34	0.01	24	0.01	10	0.00
Davao del Sur	103,437	62.80	4,909	2.98	56,135	34.08	25	0.02	59	0.04	48	0.03	16	0.01	19	0.01	21	0.01	7	0.00	24	0.01	8	0.00	8	0.00
Davao Oriental	87,293	66.73	4,978	3.81	38,444	29.39	14	0.01	31	0.02	20	0.02	10	0.01	5	0.00	6	0.00	4	0.00	11	0.01	4	0.00	1	0.00
Dipolog	22,068	82.81	2,825	10.60	1,694	6.36	9	0.03	11	0.04	29	0.11	3	0.01	1	0.00	2	0.01	1	0.00	2	0.01	1	0.00	3	0.01
Dumaguete	21,123	77.14	2,532	9.25	3,626	13.24	9	0.03	37	0.14	20	0.07	3	0.01	7	0.03	7	0.03	5	0.02	7	0.03	2	0.01	3	0.01
Eastern Samar	137,958	96.03	4,241	2.95	1,459	1.02	0	0.00	0	0.00	0	0.00	0	0.00	0	0.00	0	0.00	0	0.00	0	0.00	0	0.00	0	0.00
General Santos	49,425	81.50	3,937	6.49	7,158	11.80	13	0.02	27	0.04	10	0.02	8	0.01	10	0.02	15	0.02	23	0.04	10	0.02	4	0.01	4	0.01
Gingoog	23,931	82.02	3,200	10.97	1,964	6.73	31	0.11	11	0.04	11	0.04	4	0.01	8	0.03	4	0.01	5	0.02	6	0.02	1	0.00	2	0.01
Ifugao	40,950	93.47	2,600	5.93	233	0.53	4	0.01	10	0.02	5	0.01	3	0.01	2	0.00	2	0.00	1	0.00	2	0.00	0	0.00	1	0.00
Iligan	39,742	72.17	11,191	20.32	3,875	7.04	38	0.07	67	0.12	57	0.10	12	0.02	14	0.03	22	0.04	11	0.02	19	0.03	16	0.03	7	0.01
Ilocos Norte	174,932	100.00	0	0.00	0	0.00	0	0.00	0	0.00	0	0.00	0	0.00	0	0.00	0	0.00	0	0.00	0	0.00	0	0.00	0	0.00
Ilocos Sur	225,761	98.71	2,533	1.11	401	0.18	1	0.00	2	0.00	0	0.00	0	0.00	2	0.00	0	0.00	0	0.00	0	0.00	2	0.00	0	0.00
Iloilo	547,040	96.80	11,907	2.11	6,184	1.09	0	0.00	0	0.00	0	0.00	0	0.00	0	0.00	0	0.00	0	0.00	0	0.00	0	0.00	0	0.00
Iloilo City	156,407	90.84	11,047	6.42	4,734	2.75	0	0.00	0	0.00	0	0.00	0	0.00	0	0.00	0	0.00	0	0.00	0	0.00	0	0.00	0	0.00
Iriga	17,004	62.09	10,211	37.28	156	0.57	3	0.01	5	0.02	2	0.01	0	0.00	2	0.01	1	0.00	0	0.00	1	0.00	1	0.00	1	0.00
Isabela	423,367	99.21	3,089	0.72	259	0.06	0	0.00	6	0.00	1	0.00	4	0.00	1	0.00	0	0.00	0	0.00	0	0.00	0	0.00	0	0.00
Kalinga-Apayao	87,196	95.86	3,434	3.78	248	0.27	11	0.01	20	0.02	14	0.02	10	0.01	9	0.01	3	0.00	1	0.00	3	0.00	12	0.01	3	0.00
La Carlota	31,874	100.00	0	0.00	0	0.00	0	0.00	0	0.00	0	0.00	0	0.00	0	0.00	0	0.00	0	0.00	0	0.00	0	0.00	0	0.00
La Union	227,319	98.02	3,696	1.59	890	0.38	0	0.00	0	0.00	0	0.00	0	0.00	0	0.00	0	0.00	0	0.00	0	0.00	0	0.00	0	0.00
Laguna	317,699	86.92	42,833	11.72	4,945	1.35	3	0.00	8	0.00	7	0.00	3	0.00	2	0.00	0	0.00	3	0.00	1	0.00	4	0.00	1	0.00
Lanao del Norte	103,905	86.94	11,721	9.81	3,617	3.03	36	0.03	54	0.05	98	0.08	6	0.01	10	0.01	25	0.02	2	0.00	12	0.01	15	0.01	9	0.01
Lanao del Sur	208,092	97.62	4,750	2.23	313	0.15	0	0.00	0	0.00	0	0.00	0	0.00	0	0.00	0	0.00	0	0.00	0	0.00	0	0.00	0	0.00
Laoag	39,149	99.87	30	0.08	19	0.05	0	0.00	0	0.00	0	0.00	0	0.00	0	0.00	0	0.00	0	0.00	0	0.00	0	0.00	0	0.00
Lapu-Lapu City	43,081	94.93	998	2.20	1,279	2.82	3	0.01	8	0.02	1	0.00	1	0.00	2	0.00	2	0.00	2	0.00	1	0.00	1	0.00	1	0.00
Las Piñas	71,045	92.18	5,649	7.33	286	0.37	22	0.03	1	0.00	11	0.01	15	0.02	2	0.00	25	0.03	6	0.01	7	0.01	1	0.00	1	0.00
Legazpi	36,289	87.09	4,932	11.84	385	0.92	8	0.02	12	0.03	16	0.04	2	0.00	2	0.00	3	0.01	4	0.01	10	0.02	2	0.00	3	0.01
Leyte	516,241	98.45	5,768	1.10	2,381	0.45	0	0.00	0	0.00	0	0.00	0	0.00	2	0.00	0	0.00	0	0.00	0	0.00	0	0.00	0	0.00
Lipa	45,509	88.36	4,841	9.40	1,084	2.10	15	0.03	9	0.02	16	0.03	8	0.02	4	0.01	3	0.01	5	0.01	4	0.01	6	0.01	2	0.00
Lucena	35,666	81.63	7,024	16.08	942	2.16	11	0.03	15	0.03	9	0.02	3	0.01	3	0.01	3	0.01	9	0.02	4	0.01	3	0.01	1	0.00
Maguindanao	229,992	95.45	9,619	3.99	906	0.38	37	0.02	53	0.02	95	0.04	32	0.01	37	0.02	58	0.02	31	0.01	32	0.01	32	0.01	24	0.01
Makati	282,765	93.35	12,654	4.18	6,652	2.20	166	0.05	195	0.06	57	0.02	65	0.02	81	0.03	50	0.02	80	0.03	40	0.01	100	0.03	10	0.00
Malabon	123,392	97.83	1,766	1.40	970	0.77	0	0.00	0	0.00	0	0.00	0	0.00	1	0.00	0	0.00	0	0.00	0	0.00	0	0.00	0	0.00
Mandaluyong	114,719	88.69	10,411	8.05	4,171	3.22	12	0.01	6	0.00	7	0.01	8	0.01	0	0.00	5	0.00	0	0.00	4	0.00	3	0.00	2	0.00
Mandaue	40,845	84.56	2,200	4.55	5,207	10.78	11	0.02	11	0.02	8	0.02	4	0.01	11	0.02	2	0.00	2	0.00	2	0.00	1	0.00	0	0.00
Manila	687,024	86.15	78,196	9.81	29,211	3.66	1,116	0.14	506	0.06	372	0.05	219	0.03	126	0.02	134	0.02	249	0.03	102	0.01	116	0.01	58	0.01
Marawi	25,082	88.00	3,225	11.31	183	0.64	2	0.01	0	0.00	1	0.00	1	0.00	0	0.00	6	0.02	1	0.00	0	0.00	1	0.00	0	0.00
Marikina	74,107	73.21	13,357	13.19	13,688	13.52	22	0.02	24	0.02	4	0.00	13	0.01	2	0.00	0	0.00	7	0.01	2	0.00	3	0.00	0	0.00
Marinduque	69,078	91.49	5,715	7.57	500	0.66	26	0.03	102	0.14	28	0.04	9	0.01	2	0.00	29	0.04	3	0.00	8	0.01	4	0.01	2	0.00
Masbate	182,234	90.80	16,318	8.13	1,950	0.97	91	0.05	23	0.01	23	0.01	13	0.01	3	0.00	19	0.01	2	0.00	10	0.00	9	0.00	1	0.00
Misamis Occidental	66,338	81.59	8,859	10.90	5,820	7.16	74	0.09	85	0.10	54	0.07	12	0.01	10	0.01	21	0.03	5	0.01	14	0.02	9	0.01	3	0.00
Misamis Oriental	118,102	85.08	12,060	8.69	8,287	5.97	95	0.07	91	0.07	65	0.05	25	0.02	45	0.03	13	0.01	6	0.00	12	0.01	12	0.01	8	0.01
Mountain Province	33,413	91.14	2,822	7.70	312	0.85	23	0.06	19	0.05	3	0.01	16	0.04	20	0.05	6	0.02	7	0.02	10	0.03	6	0.02	3	0.01
Muntinlupa	76,927	95.76	2,657	3.31	734	0.91	5	0.01	6	0.01	0	0.00	0	0.00	1	0.00	0	0.00	5	0.01	0	0.00	2	0.00	0	0.00
Naga	28,622	80.70	6,378	17.98	385	1.09	9	0.03	28	0.08	10	0.03	6	0.02	4	0.01	2	0.01	6	0.02	6	0.02	2	0.01	7	0.02
Navotas	71,071	94.83	3,500	4.67	309	0.41	27	0.04	0	0.00	4	0.01	3	0.00	5	0.01	10	0.01	2	0.00	10	0.01	2	0.00	0	0.00
Negros Occidental	527,330	99.52	1,299	0.25	1,239	0.23	0	0.00	0	0.00	0	0.00	0	0.00	0	0.00	0	0.00	0	0.00	0	0.00	0	0.00	0	0.00
Negros Oriental	202,622	83.61	15,270	6.30	24,166	9.97	81	0.03	67	0.03	47	0.02	12	0.00	12	0.00	29	0.01	5	0.00	19	0.01	11	0.00	2	0.00
North Cotabato	127,700	72.34	41,339	23.42	7,090	4.02	44	0.02	59	0.03	120	0.07	39	0.02	29	0.02	50	0.03	9	0.01	24	0.01	17	0.01	19	0.01
Northern Samar	148,552	91.33	12,851	7.90	1,176	0.72	15	0.01	10	0.01	20	0.01	4	0.00	9	0.01	10	0.01	2	0.00	4	0.00	5	0.00	0	0.00
Nueva Ecija	328,440	91.55	28,812	8.03	1,375	0.38	28	0.01	26	0.01	37	0.01	3	0.00	2	0.00	5	0.00	7	0.00	7	0.00	6	0.00	1	0.00
Nueva Vizcaya	97,222	88.83	11,074	10.12	919	0.84	43	0.04	33	0.03	86	0.08	27	0.02	4	0.00	9	0.01	6	0.01	5	0.00	14	0.01	2	0.00
Occidental Mindoro	72,325	90.15	7,281	9.08	533	0.66	17	0.02	13	0.02	20	0.02	13	0.02	1	0.00	15	0.02	7	0.01	2	0.00	1	0.00	1	0.00
Olongapo	67,072	89.26	6,435	8.56	1,564	2.08	16	0.02	10	0.01	9	0.01	6	0.01	4	0.01	7	0.01	13	0.02	3	0.00	2	0.00	1	0.00
Oriental Mindoro	154,295	91.54	13,189	7.83	1,053	0.62	1	0.00	6	0.00	1	0.00	0	0.00	1	0.00	0	0.00	0	0.00	0	0.00	1	0.00	0	0.00
Ormoc	48,455	98.04	700	1.42	269	0.54	0	0.00	0	0.00	0	0.00	0	0.00	0	0.00	0	0.00	0	0.00	0	0.00	0	0.00	0	0.00
Oroquieta	11,457	69.69	2,522	15.34	2,337	14.21	18	0.11	55	0.33	17	0.10	6	0.04	6	0.04	10	0.06	1	0.01	3	0.02	5	0.03	4	0.02
Ozamiz	21,080	81.75	2,767	10.73	1,836	7.12	16	0.06	29	0.11	18	0.07	8	0.03	10	0.04	6	0.02	1	0.00	9	0.03	5	0.02	1	0.00
Pagadian	20,564	82.10	3,356	13.40	1,059	4.23	10	0.04	18	0.07	21	0.08	1	0.00	4	0.02	5	0.02	3	0.01	5	0.02	2	0.01	1	0.00
Palawan	83,646	85.93	12,790	13.14	766	0.79	23	0.02	23	0.02	40	0.04	7	0.01	3	0.00	15	0.02	6	0.01	7	0.01	10	0.01	1	0.00
Palayan	9,685	97.06	256	2.57	34	0.34	0	0.00	0	0.00	0	0.00	3	0.03	0	0.00	0	0.00	0	0.00	0	0.00	0	0.00	0	0.00
Pampanga	340,493	90.68	28,472	7.58	6,173	1.64	136	0.04	48	0.01	40	0.01	26	0.01	12	0.00	26	0.01	30	0.01	10	0.00	16	0.00	6	0.00
Pangasinan	574,285	89.62	61,965	9.67	4,067	0.63	65	0.01	44	0.01	263	0.04	31	0.00	5	0.00	20	0.00	19	0.00	35	0.01	5	0.00	5	0.00
Parañaque	124,782	93.23	8,449	6.31	609	0.46	0	0.00	0	0.00	0	0.00	0	0.00	0	0.00	0	0.00	0	0.00	0	0.00	0	0.00	0	0.00
Pasay	134,856	90.35	9,318	6.24	4,860	3.26	67	0.04	45	0.03	20	0.01	20	0.01	8	0.01	14	0.01	23	0.02	5	0.00	11	0.01	8	0.01
Pasig	159,577	91.55	11,767	6.75	2,705	1.55	58	0.03	58	0.03	30	0.02	31	0.02	6	0.00	22	0.01	24	0.01	16	0.01	5	0.00	6	0.00
Pateros	22,877	93.06	1,342	5.46	335	1.36	6	0.02	5	0.02	0	0.00	13	0.05	0	0.00	1	0.00	1	0.00	0	0.00	0	0.00	2	0.01
Puerto Princesa	22,556	89.49	2,481	9.84	157	0.62	4	0.02	3	0.01	1	0.00	0	0.00	1	0.00	1	0.00	0	0.00	1	0.00	0	0.00	0	0.00
Quezon	231,831	68.01	104,766	30.73	3,712	1.09	114	0.03	108	0.03	116	0.03	42	0.01	30	0.01	54	0.02	31	0.01	39	0.01	37	0.01	14	0.00
Quezon City	580,821	89.33	48,167	7.41	19,358	2.98	460	0.07	367	0.06	216	0.03	234	0.04	74	0.01	64	0.01	195	0.03	64	0.01	97	0.01	64	0.01
Quirino	37,005	94.96	1,918	4.92	38	0.10	3	0.01	1	0.00	3	0.01	0	0.00	0	0.00	2	0.01	0	0.00	0	0.00	1	0.00	0	0.00
Rizal	201,694	86.47	26,814	11.50	4,329	1.86	93	0.04	64	0.03	42	0.02	38	0.02	113	0.05	14	0.01	27	0.01	14	0.01	12	0.01	7	0.00
Romblon	67,721	94.44	3,463	4.83	473	0.66	8	0.01	22	0.03	4	0.01	1	0.00	3	0.00	3	0.00	3	0.00	2	0.00	4	0.01	1	0.00
Roxas City	42,020	90.84	2,974	6.43	1,263	2.73	0	0.00	0	0.00	0	0.00	0	0.00	0	0.00	0	0.00	0	0.00	0	0.00	0	0.00	0	0.00
Samar	164,566	98.59	1,611	0.97	736	0.44	0	0.00	1	0.00	0	0.00	0	0.00	2	0.00	1	0.00	3	0.00	1	0.00	1	0.00	0	0.00
San Carlos, Negros Occidental	25,470	84.80	2,636	8.78	1,844	6.14	13	0.04	10	0.03	52	0.17	0	0.00	1	0.00	1	0.00	1	0.00	4	0.01	1	0.00	2	0.01
San Carlos, Pangasinan	35,887	91.17	3,261	8.28	166	0.42	12	0.03	2	0.01	13	0.03	0	0.00	4	0.01	8	0.02	3	0.01	5	0.01	0	0.00	2	0.01
San Jose	26,145	88.24	3,246	10.96	225	0.76	2	0.01	3	0.01	4	0.01	0	0.00	1	0.00	0	0.00	1	0.00	1	0.00	0	0.00	0	0.00
San Juan	63,189	86.65	6,476	8.88	3,057	4.19	73	0.10	48	0.07	15	0.02	19	0.03	6	0.01	6	0.01	14	0.02	10	0.01	8	0.01	7	0.01
San Pablo	47,568	82.05	8,950	15.44	1,341	2.31	20	0.03	34	0.06	21	0.04	6	0.01	5	0.01	9	0.02	5	0.01	6	0.01	3	0.01	4	0.01
Silay	37,895	99.52	144	0.38	37	0.10	0	0.00	0	0.00	0	0.00	0	0.00	0	0.00	0	0.00	0	0.00	0	0.00	0	0.00	0	0.00
Siquijor	27,935	89.51	2,006	6.43	1,247	4.00	7	0.02	4	0.01	2	0.01	1	0.00	1	0.00	1	0.00	1	0.00	1	0.00	3	0.01	0	0.00
Sorsogon	129,830	73.42	45,432	25.69	1,194	0.68	40	0.02	80	0.05	56	0.03	19	0.01	14	0.01	45	0.03	11	0.01	15	0.01	87	0.05	4	0.00
South Cotabato	153,454	75.46	39,549	19.45	10,142	4.99	26	0.01	46	0.02	22	0.01	28	0.01	5	0.00	33	0.02	6	0.00	22	0.01	16	0.01	8	0.00
Southern Leyte	142,989	96.38	3,175	2.14	2,200	1.48	0	0.00	0	0.00	0	0.00	0	0.00	0	0.00	0	0.00	0	0.00	0	0.00	0	0.00	0	0.00
Sultan Kudarat	89,564	85.70	13,680	13.09	1,147	1.10	16	0.02	17	0.02	50	0.05	3	0.00	4	0.00	12	0.01	6	0.01	6	0.01	2	0.00	2	0.00
Sulu	125,976	96.69	3,748	2.88	382	0.29	19	0.01	30	0.02	22	0.02	12	0.01	17	0.01	24	0.02	10	0.01	15	0.01	18	0.01	13	0.01
Surigao City	26,388	84.62	2,767	8.87	1,965	6.30	17	0.05	12	0.04	8	0.03	3	0.01	11	0.04	7	0.02	2	0.01	3	0.01	1	0.00	0	0.00
Surigao del Norte	104,644	87.28	9,510	7.93	5,632	4.70	28	0.02	30	0.03	5	0.00	9	0.01	8	0.01	7	0.01	5	0.00	5	0.00	11	0.01	2	0.00
Surigao del Sur	92,663	73.55	20,771	16.49	12,108	9.61	84	0.07	67	0.05	69	0.05	33	0.03	36	0.03	62	0.05	15	0.01	38	0.03	32	0.03	10	0.01
Tacloban	58,614	98.27	703	1.18	330	0.55	0	0.00	0	0.00	0	0.00	0	0.00	0	0.00	0	0.00	0	0.00	0	0.00	0	0.00	0	0.00
Tagaytay	8,181	98.16	138	1.66	15	0.18	0	0.00	0	0.00	0	0.00	0	0.00	0	0.00	0	0.00	0	0.00	0	0.00	0	0.00	0	0.00
Tagbilaran City	15,300	80.62	822	4.33	2,818	14.85	9	0.05	12	0.06	3	0.02	3	0.02	6	0.03	1	0.01	2	0.01	1	0.01	1	0.01	1	0.01
Taguig	45,037	86.90	5,705	11.01	1,017	1.96	20	0.04	9	0.02	19	0.04	5	0.01	2	0.00	3	0.01	5	0.01	4	0.01	1	0.00	1	0.00
Tangub	13,973	96.81	310	2.15	144	1.00	1	0.01	2	0.01	2	0.01	0	0.00	0	0.00	0	0.00	0	0.00	2	0.01	0	0.00	0	0.00
Tarlac	294,750	97.12	7,427	2.45	1,236	0.41	28	0.01	18	0.01	7	0.00	4	0.00	2	0.00	5	0.00	2	0.00	1	0.00	5	0.00	0	0.00
Tawi-Tawi	33,331	100.00	0	0.00	0	0.00	0	0.00	0	0.00	0	0.00	0	0.00	0	0.00	0	0.00	0	0.00	0	0.00	0	0.00	0	0.00
Toledo	31,354	84.80	2,121	5.74	3,455	9.34	18	0.05	2	0.01	8	0.02	0	0.00	5	0.01	1	0.00	0	0.00	2	0.01	8	0.02	0	0.00
Trece Martires	5,236	100.00	0	0.00	0	0.00	0	0.00	0	0.00	0	0.00	0	0.00	0	0.00	0	0.00	0	0.00	0	0.00	0	0.00	0	0.00
Valenzuela	73,320	83.52	12,458	14.19	1,860	2.12	51	0.06	23	0.03	18	0.02	15	0.02	7	0.01	10	0.01	12	0.01	10	0.01	5	0.01	2	0.00
Zambales	124,609	96.62	3,759	2.91	515	0.40	3	0.00	6	0.00	5	0.00	4	0.00	2	0.00	3	0.00	63	0.05	1	0.00	0	0.00	0	0.00
Zamboanga City	78,495	83.31	13,264	14.08	2,191	2.33	36	0.04	67	0.07	56	0.06	17	0.02	11	0.01	36	0.04	11	0.01	14	0.01	11	0.01	8	0.01
Zamboanga del Norte	97,141	88.74	8,367	7.64	3,888	3.55	16	0.01	14	0.01	10	0.01	2	0.00	6	0.01	8	0.01	4	0.00	7	0.01	3	0.00	2	0.00
Zamboanga del Sur	207,311	80.79	36,153	14.09	12,258	4.78	149	0.06	242	0.09	196	0.08	63	0.02	46	0.02	50	0.02	14	0.01	51	0.02	26	0.01	32	0.01
Total	18,309,360	88.02	1,716,449	8.25	749,845	3.60	6,499	0.03	4,955	0.02	4,224	0.02	1,954	0.01	1,945	0.01	1,740	0.01	1,421	0.01	1,234	0.01	1,185	0.01	592	0.00
Source: Commission on Elections

=== Referendum on holding barangay elections ===
Like the presidential election, the measure was carried by overwhelming margins, but notably a large majority in Muntinlupa and a smaller majority in Marawi rejected the measure; it was otherwise carried other places canvassed by the Batasang Pambansa.

==== Summary ====
Do you want to have a barangay election immediately after the presidential election?
Choice	Votes	%
Yes	16,268,523	81.09
No	3,793,322	18.91
Total	20,061,845	100.00
Valid votes	20,061,845	91.84
Invalid/blank votes	1,781,984	8.16
Total votes	21,843,829	100.00
Registered voters/turnout	26,986,451	80.94
Source: Proclamation No. 2094, s. 1981

1981 Philippine barangay referendum results (excluding invalid votes)
Yes; 16,268,523 (81.1%)
▲50%

==== By province/city ====
Province/City	Yes	%	No	%	Total
Abra	75,348	88.40%	9,889	11.60%	85,237
Agusan del Norte	71,803	83.74%	13,946	16.26%	85,749
Agusan del Sur	75,720	82.04%	16,571	17.96%	92,291
Aklan	104,436	78.24%	29,038	21.76%	133,474
Albay	209,958	82.85%	43,452	17.15%	253,410
Angeles City	54,054	85.70%	9,016	14.30%	63,070
Antique	113,333	71.22%	45,796	28.78%	159,129
Aurora	27,961	74.78%	9,428	25.22%	37,389
Bacolod City	103,869	82.06%	22,708	17.94%	126,577
Bago	29,835	74.49%	10,218	25.51%	40,053
Baguio	49,448	85.40%	8,455	14.60%	57,903
Bais	15,819	81.47%	3,599	18.53%	19,418
Basilan	45,758	77.82%	13,042	22.18%	58,800
Bataan	115,717	85.37%	19,824	14.63%	135,541
Batanes	3,660	87.60%	518	12.40%	4,178
Batangas	307,990	75.73%	98,695	24.27%	406,685
Batangas City	46,368	79.37%	12,052	20.63%	58,420
Benguet	78,242	77.45%	22,787	22.55%	101,029
Bohol	284,571	84.05%	53,984	15.95%	338,555
Bukidnon	162,054	81.27%	37,339	18.73%	199,393
Bulacan	385,518	84.68%	69,766	15.32%	455,284
Butuan	57,128	86.41%	8,983	13.59%	66,111
Cabanatuan	49,215	89.44%	5,810	10.56%	55,025
Cadiz	51,271	85.92%	8,400	14.08%	59,671
Cagayan	241,410	74.10%	84,366	25.90%	325,776
Cagayan de Oro	79,992	84.71%	14,433	15.29%	94,425
Calbayog	35,527	86.16%	5,709	13.84%	41,236
Caloocan	173,165	84.54%	31,660	15.46%	204,825
Camarines Norte	66,338	79.00%	17,632	21.00%	83,970
Camarines Sur	258,506	76.90%	77,632	23.10%	336,138
Camiguin	21,548	87.64%	3,039	12.36%	24,587
Canlaon	9,332	83.66%	1,823	16.34%	11,155
Capiz	112,714	69.95%	48,418	30.05%	161,132
Catanduanes	61,973	85.76%	10,287	14.24%	72,260
Cavite	181,276	64.31%	100,602	35.69%	281,878
Cavite City	39,334	86.58%	6,099	13.42%	45,433
Cebu	451,192	80.68%	108,049	19.32%	559,241
Cebu City	270,575	94.23%	16,553	5.77%	287,128
Cotabato City	23,476	84.27%	4,383	15.73%	27,859
Dagupan	38,443	89.60%	4,464	10.40%	42,907
Danao	49,356	96.26%	1,916	3.74%	51,272
Dapitan	18,297	82.06%	3,999	17.94%	22,296
Davao City	128,028	79.34%	33,335	20.66%	161,363
Davao del Norte	211,333	76.55%	64,754	23.45%	276,087
Davao del Sur	126,691	79.49%	32,696	20.51%	159,387
Davao Oriental	100,175	82.27%	21,584	17.73%	121,759
Dipolog	20,040	71.35%	8,048	28.65%	28,088
Dumaguete	23,860	81.56%	5,395	18.44%	29,255
Eastern Samar	142,199	98.98%	1,459	1.02%	143,658
General Santos	48,544	77.55%	14,052	22.45%	62,596
Gingoog	26,025	83.29%	5,223	16.71%	31,248
Ifugao	26,405	69.69%	11,482	30.31%	37,887
Iligan City	51,067	84.64%	9,264	15.36%	60,331
Ilocos Norte	155,515	89.64%	17,980	10.36%	173,495
Ilocos Sur	196,979	85.92%	32,276	14.08%	229,255
Iloilo	406,918	76.04%	128,213	23.96%	535,131
Iloilo City	118,397	72.28%	45,412	27.72%	163,809
Iriga City	23,765	86.49%	3,711	13.51%	27,476
Isabela	341,115	88.91%	42,569	11.09%	383,684
Kalinga-Apayao	63,301	69.58%	27,673	30.42%	90,974
La Carlota City	27,267	87.84%	3,776	12.16%	31,043
La Union	230,516	84.17%	43,349	15.83%	273,865
Laguna	227,928	78.84%	61,180	21.16%	289,108
Lanao del Norte	85,853	77.32%	25,176	22.68%	111,029
Lanao del Sur	134,466	65.12%	72,039	34.88%	206,505
Laoag City	35,160	90.63%	3,633	9.37%	38,793
Lapu-Lapu City	38,394	84.70%	6,938	15.30%	45,332
Las Piñas	46,098	84.20%	8,649	15.80%	54,747
Legazpi City	36,156	82.61%	7,610	17.39%	43,766
Leyte	484,538	93.11%	35,853	6.89%	520,391
Lipa City	44,226	84.84%	7,900	15.16%	52,126
Lucena City	37,427	83.35%	7,475	16.65%	44,902
Maguindanao	163,076	72.99%	60,342	27.01%	223,418
Makati	84,150	70.23%	35,674	29.77%	119,824
Malabon	94,277	84.71%	17,014	15.29%	111,291
Mandaluyong	72,826	68.39%	33,657	31.61%	106,483
Mandaue City	43,300	85.38%	7,416	14.62%	50,716
Manila	699,432	85.24%	121,158	14.76%	820,590
Marawi City	11,600	46.90%	13,134	53.10%	24,734
Marikina	74,569	86.13%	12,009	13.87%	86,578
Marinduque	66,406	84.57%	12,117	15.43%	78,523
Masbate	171,991	85.36%	29,503	14.64%	201,494
Misamis Occidental	75,352	82.15%	16,369	17.85%	91,721
Misamis Oriental	124,987	83.21%	25,223	16.79%	150,210
Mountain Province	28,741	83.68%	5,606	16.32%	34,347
Muntinlupa	14,532	18.55%	63,805	81.45%	78,337
Naga City	32,039	85.12%	5,602	14.88%	37,641
Navotas	45,637	90.08%	5,027	9.92%	50,664
Negros Occidental	318,634	76.85%	96,008	23.15%	414,642
Negros Oriental	207,909	83.56%	40,908	16.44%	248,817
North Cotabato	195,220	81.38%	44,662	18.62%	239,882
Northern Samar	110,531	84.60%	20,114	15.40%	130,645
Nueva Ecija	269,078	80.77%	64,077	19.23%	333,155
Nueva Vizcaya	91,965	78.84%	24,682	21.16%	116,647
Occidental Mindoro	52,804	85.44%	8,995	14.56%	61,799
Olongapo City	61,506	77.15%	18,217	22.85%	79,723
Oriental Mindoro	145,221	85.92%	23,791	14.08%	169,012
Ormoc City	48,330	98.45%	761	1.55%	49,091
Oroquieta City	16,186	82.10%	3,529	17.90%	19,715
Ozamiz City	25,355	78.45%	6,965	21.55%	32,320
Pagadian City	22,538	80.91%	5,319	19.09%	27,857
Palawan	82,003	83.90%	15,735	16.10%	97,738
Palayan City	8,181	82.11%	1,782	17.89%	9,963
Pampanga	280,741	80.34%	68,714	19.66%	349,455
Pangasinan	569,883	88.90%	71,132	11.10%	641,015
Parañaque	108,216	85.18%	18,825	14.82%	127,041
Pasay City	116,428	77.37%	34,062	22.63%	150,490
Pasig	85,510	84.65%	15,508	15.35%	101,018
Pateros	16,704	81.48%	3,796	18.52%	20,500
Puerto Princesa City	22,407	87.79%	3,115	12.21%	25,522
Quezon	278,706	81.56%	62,996	18.44%	341,702
Quezon City	468,821	73.93%	165,349	26.07%	634,170
Quirino	30,772	79.93%	7,728	20.07%	38,500
Rizal	198,945	88.60%	25,596	11.40%	224,541
Romblon	62,993	85.01%	11,104	14.99%	74,097
Roxas City	26,085	80.90%	6,159	19.10%	32,244
Samar	98,334	82.55%	20,792	17.45%	119,126
San Carlos City, Negros Occidental	25,415	86.75%	3,882	13.25%	29,297
San Carlos City, Pangasinan	32,426	81.56%	7,329	18.44%	39,755
San Jose City	27,464	90.88%	2,756	9.12%	30,220
San Juan	59,500	80.27%	14,621	19.73%	74,121
San Pablo City	49,879	81.98%	10,964	18.02%	60,843
Silay City	28,473	77.17%	8,422	22.83%	36,895
Siquijor	26,807	81.42%	6,118	18.58%	32,925
Sorsogon	154,603	85.27%	26,708	14.73%	181,311
South Cotabato	147,860	72.48%	56,148	27.52%	204,008
Southern Leyte	145,189	97.86%	3,175	2.14%	148,364
Sultan Kudarat	86,585	85.83%	14,290	14.17%	100,875
Sulu	95,311	74.88%	31,980	25.12%	127,291
Surigao City	28,015	87.67%	3,941	12.33%	31,956
Surigao del Norte	110,183	88.29%	14,608	11.71%	124,791
Surigao del Sur	104,787	81.39%	23,967	18.61%	128,754
Tacloban City	58,945	99.01%	590	0.99%	59,535
Tagaytay City	5,231	63.78%	2,970	36.22%	8,201
Tagbilaran City	15,034	76.31%	4,666	23.69%	19,700
Taguig	45,214	86.71%	6,930	13.29%	52,144
Tangub City	10,433	71.00%	4,261	29.00%	14,694
Tarlac	233,144	93.37%	16,548	6.63%	249,692
Tawi-Tawi	45,610	77.01%	13,616	22.99%	59,226
Toledo City	27,486	71.87%	10,759	28.13%	38,245
Trece Martires City	3,218	61.42%	2,021	38.58%	5,239
Valenzuela	53,337	83.95%	10,198	16.05%	63,535
Zambales	111,470	87.07%	16,548	12.93%	128,018
Zamboanga City	73,896	78.86%	19,812	21.14%	93,708
Zamboanga del Norte	91,490	81.79%	20,365	18.21%	111,855
Zamboanga del Sur	208,751	79.81%	52,804	20.19%	261,555
Total	16,268,523	81.55%	3,793,322	18.45%	19,886,751
Source: Commission on Elections

== Aftermath ==
Marcos was inaugurated on June 30, 1981, at the Quirino Grandstand, with then-United States Vice President George H. W. Bush in attendance. This is when Bush made the infamous praise for Marcos: "We love your adherence to democratic principles and to the democratic process."

Barangay elections were indeed held on May 17, 1982.

On August 21, 1983, Senator Aquino returned from exile in the United States, but was assassinated at Manila International Airport. Growing unrest followed, and Marcos was forced to call the snap election of 1986, where UNIDO and Partido Demokratiko Pilipino–Lakas ng Bayan (PDP–Laban) participated and nominated Aquino's widow Corazon Aquino as their presidential nominee. Marcos claimed victory over Aquino despite reports of massive cheating, but he was removed from power a few hours after his oath-taking on February 25, 1986.

== See also ==
- Commission on Elections
- Politics of the Philippines
- Philippine elections
- President of the Philippines
