= Federal Party (Philippines) =

- Founded: 1953 (Third Republic); January 17, 1981 (Fourth Republic)
- Dissolved: 1961 (Third Republic); Late 1981 (Fourth Republic)
- Ideology: Pro-Statehood

Parties going by the name of the "Federal Party" were political parties that advocated for the Philippines to become a U.S state after it became independent in 1946. These parties were the ideological successors of the Federalista Party (transl. Federalist Party) of the early 20th century, a party that originally advocated for the Philippines to be a U.S. state while under U.S. rule.

== Third Republic (1953–1961) ==
A "Federal Party" existed during the Third Philippine Republic. Alfredo Abcede was a two-time presidential candidate of this Federal Party. In 1957, Abcede lost, winning 470 votes nationally or less than 0.01%. In 1961, he lost again, polling a mere seven votes. Abcede also ran for the Senate in 1953, 1955 and 1959, losing each time, and never getting more than 0.5% of the vote.

== Fourth Republic (1981) ==
Former Representative from Bohol Bartolome Cabangbang was one of the candidates in the 1981 presidential election overwhelmingly won by the incumbent president Ferdinand Marcos. This election was boycotted by most opposition parties when their preferred candidate, Benigno Aquino Jr., was barred from running for being underage. Cabangbang's platform of the Philippines becoming the 51st state of the United States earned him a surprising 4% of the vote, attributed to the people's yearning for the American colonial administration in preference to Marcos' just-concluded martial law.

== Electoral history ==
=== For president ===
Year	Candidate	Votes	%	Result
1957	Alfredo Abcede	470	0.01	Lost
1961	Alfredo Abcede	7	0.00	Lost
1965–1969	Did not participate			
1981	Bartolome Cabangbang	749,845	3.60	Lost

=== Senate ===
Year	Votes	%	Seats won	Seats after	Result
1953	5,365	0.1	0	0	Lost
1955	22,769	0.5	0	0	Lost
1957	Did not participate				
1959	27,383	0.4	0	0	Lost
