= Alejo Santos =

Filipino general and politician

The Honorable Alejo Santos
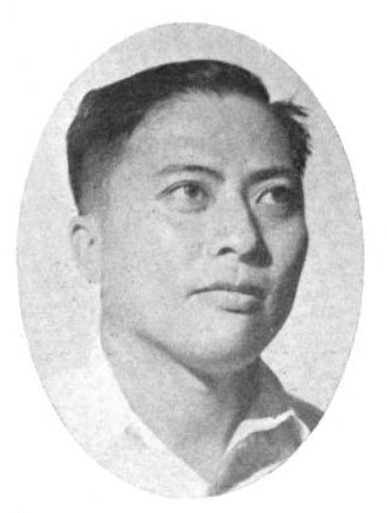
- Santos official portrait during the 2nd Congress.

Director of the Bureau of Prisons
- In office 1967–1971
- President: Ferdinand Marcos
- Preceded by: Dominador Danan
- Succeeded by: Vicente R. Raval

12th Secretary of National Defense of the Philippines
- In office June 11, 1959 – December 30, 1961
- President: Carlos P. Garcia
- Preceded by: Jesus M. Vargas
- Succeeded by: Macario Peralta Jr.

20th and 25th Governor of Bulacan
- In office 1951–1957
- Preceded by: Fortunato Halili
- Succeeded by: Tomas Martin
- In office 1945–1946
- Preceded by: Jose delos Reyes
- Succeeded by: Arturo Samaniego

Member of the House of Representatives from Bulacan's 2nd District
- In office 1946–1946
- Preceded by: Antonio Villarama
- Succeeded by: Vacant (Note: Santos was unseated together with several of his party-mates in the leftist Democratic Alliance in a controversial maneuver believed to be related with the looming congressional vote on the approval of the Bell Trade Act with the United States.)
- In office December 30, 1949 – December 30, 1951
- Preceded by: Vacant
- Succeeded by: Rogaciano M. Mercado

Personal details
- Born: Alejo de los Santos de los Santos; July 17, 1911 (Note: Alejo Santos was thirty-five days old when he was baptized on August 20, 1911, making July 17, 1911 as his date of birth.) Bustos, Bulacan, Insular Government of the Philippine Islands
- Died: February 18, 1984 (aged 72) Quezon City, Philippines
- Party: Nacionalista (1949–1984); Democratic Alliance (1946–1949)
- Spouse: Juanita Garcia (m. 1934)
- Children: 8

Military service
- Allegiance: Philippines
- Branch/service: United States Army Forces Far East; Philippine Commonwealth Army
- Rank: Brigadier general
- Commands: Bulacan Military Area
- Battles/wars: World War II; Battle of Bataan; Liberation of the Philippines

Alejo Santos Santos (born Alejo de los Santos de los Santos; July 17, 1911 – February 18, 1984) was a Filipino soldier, World War II hero and politician. He was the only major candidate opposing Ferdinand Marcos in the 1981 Philippine presidential election.

== Early life and public service ==
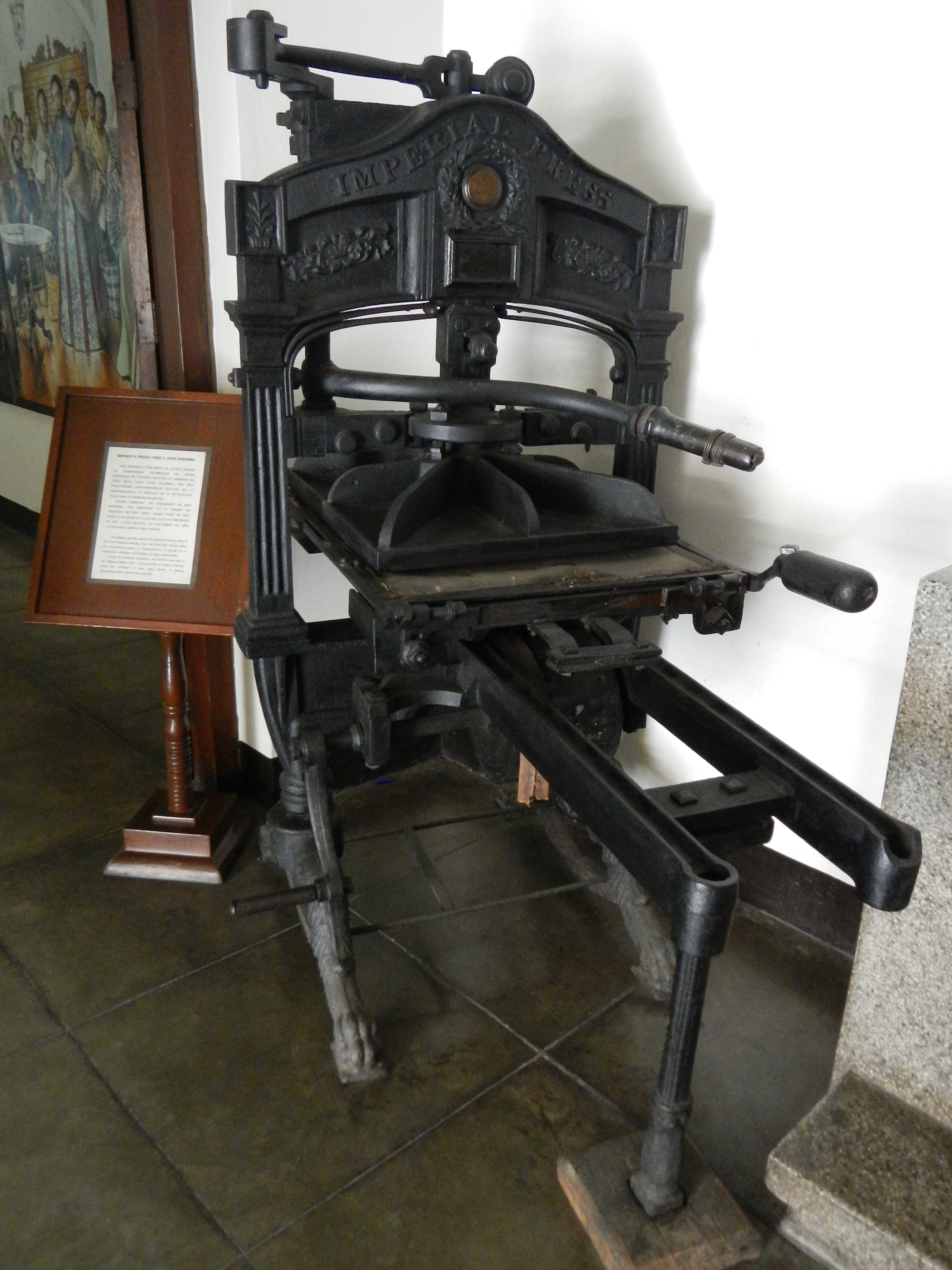
The 1860 Imprenta Press printed key revolutionary newspapers and was later used by the "Bulacan Military Area", under Capt. Alejo Santos, against the Japanese during WWII.

Santos was born in Barangay Bonga Menor, Bustos, Bulacan, to farmer Pedro de los Santos y de la Cruz and Regina de los Santos y Francisco. He graduated from the University of the Philippines with an education degree. He first served as Prison Guard with the Bureau of Prisons from 1933 to 1934. Santos married Juanita Garcia of Baliuag, Bulacan in 1934 and they had eight children: Reynaldo, Edgardo, Ravenal, Lamberto, Alexis, Liberty, Daisy, and Nenita. At the outbreak of World War II, he was a captain of the USAFFE. He was among the USAFFE soldiers who retreated to Bataan to make the last stand against the invading Imperial Japanese Army. However, he evaded capture by the Japanese when Bataan fell, escaping instead to his hometown. Santos then agreed to join the fledgling anti-Japanese guerrilla warfare movement under Bernard L. Anderson. He became one of the founders of the Bulacan Military Area, the main guerrilla movement in Bulacan which had 23,000 men under its command. The BMA attracted many patriotic Filipinos chafing under Japanese rule, and was soon organized into eight divisions. For his World War II activities, Santos received numerous citations and awards from the Philippine and American governments.

He was the only Filipino conferred the rank of brigadier general by the American Government.

== Political career ==
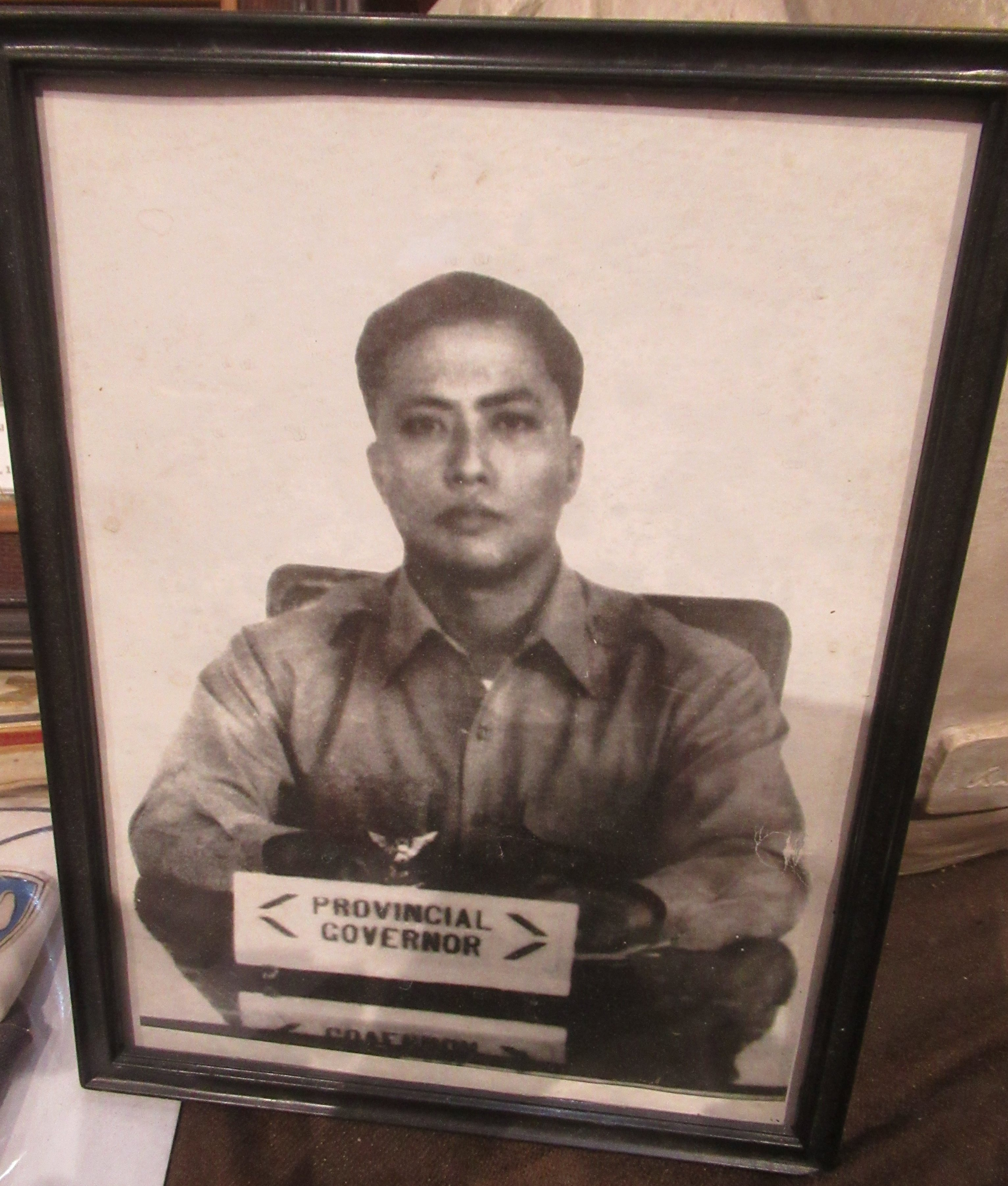
Photo of Santos as Bulacan governor

After the liberation of Bulacan by joint Filipino and American ground troops in 1945, Santos was named as its military governor. He was elected as to the House of Representatives in 1946, representing the 2nd District of Bulacan under the banner of the leftist Democratic Alliance, but was almost immediately unseated together with several of his party-mates in a controversial maneuver believed to be related with the looming congressional vote on the approval of the Bell Trade Act with the United States. Nonetheless, Santos was again elected to the House in 1949, and he served in the 2nd Congress until his election as governor of Bulacan in 1951. By then, Santos had affiliated with the Nacionalista Party. Santos would serve as governor until 1957, wherein 705 public works projects were constructed in Bulacan and the national government released ₱1.9 million for these. From 1959 to 1961, Santos served as Secretary of National Defense in the cabinet of President Carlos P. Garcia. In 1967, he was appointed by President Marcos to head the prison bureau, a post he held until 1971.

== Presidential candidacy ==
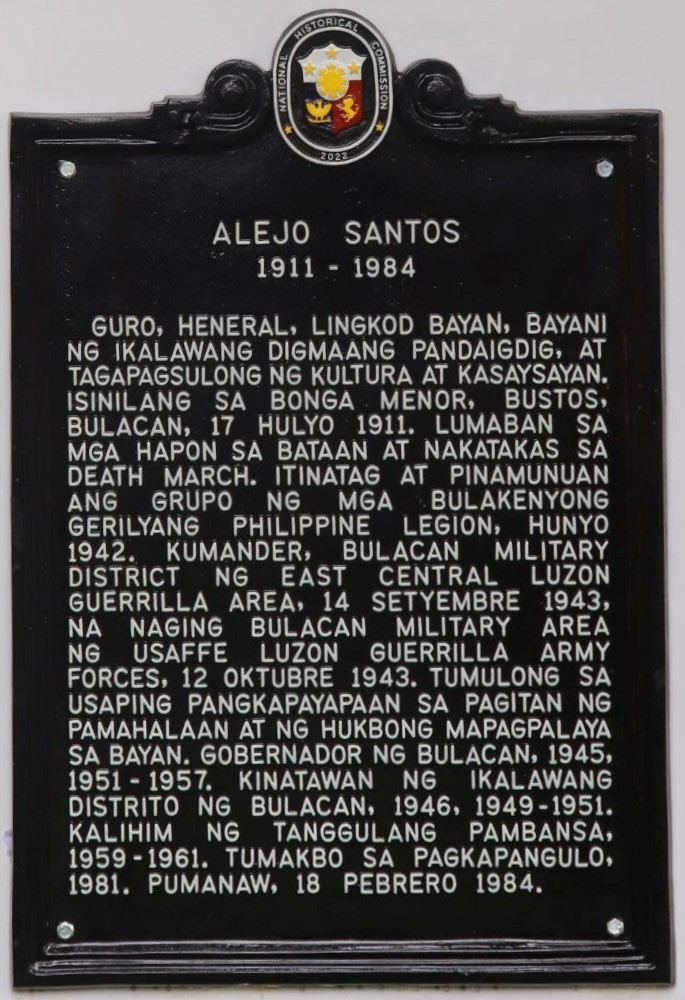
Historical marker installed in Bustos, Bulacan

By 1981, Santos had mostly retired from political life, devoting his activity to veterans affairs; thus, it came as a surprise when he agreed to run for President against Ferdinand Marcos in the 1981 elections. The elections were called shortly after Marcos lifted the nine-year-old declaration of martial law while retaining authoritarian powers at the same time, and were seen as a means of maintaining the veneer of democracy, especially in the international community. However, the anti-Marcos political opposition, which felt it was cheated out of victory in the 1978 parliamentary elections, refused to participate in the presidential elections and successfully called for a boycott. Santos' candidacy, ostensibly under the banner of the then-moribund Nacionalista Party, provided Marcos with at least one other "major" candidate he could run against. Santos, though the sole widely known opponent of Marcos, did not offer a vigorous campaign, and he was trounced in the election, garnering only 8% of the vote as against Marcos's 88%.

== Death ==
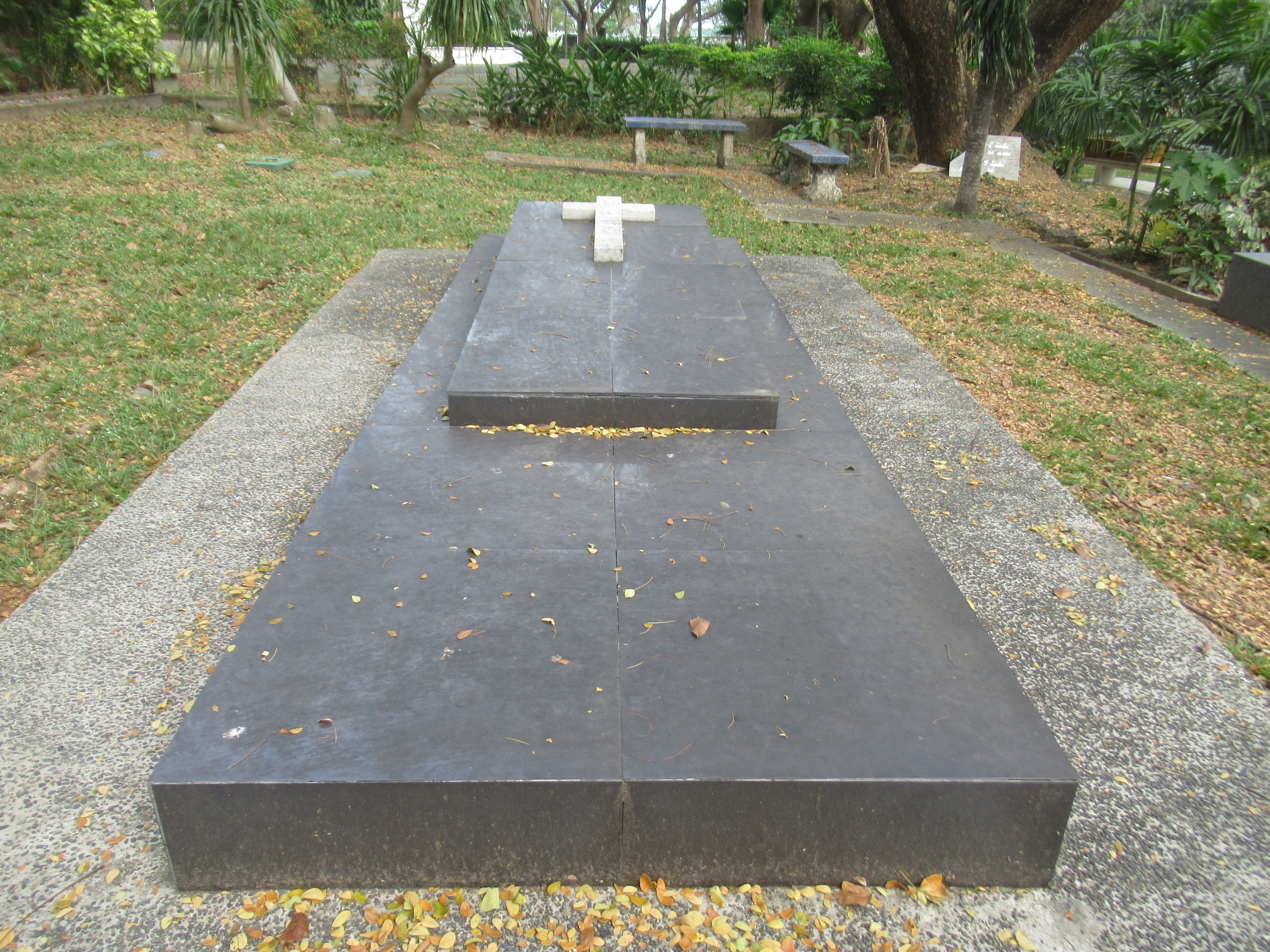
Gravesite of Santos and his wife Juanita at the Libingan ng mga Bayani, photo taken in 2025.

Santos died just three years after his presidential candidacy on February 18, 1984 and was buried at the Libingan ng mga Bayani. Later on, his remains were transferred into a memorial park in his hometown in Bulacan. A camp of the Philippine National Police in Bulacan is named after Santos.

== Memorials ==
- The new General Alejo S. Santos Bridge was inaugurated by Secretary Mark Villar on February 19, 2020. One of the oldest bridges in Bulacan, built in 1968, was renamed on September 25, 1989 by Republic Act No.6762 to honor Santos. It connects Barangay Tibag and Barangay Poblacion along Angat River.
- For being a World War II hero and founder of the Bulacan Military Area, a National Historical Commission of the Philippines marker was placed on 17 July 2022, at Bustos Heritage Park, Poblacion, Bustos, Bulacan for General Alejo S. Santos.
- The birth house of General Alejo S. Santos is now the Alejo Santos Memorial Shrine and Museum (Bulacan Military Area, Bustos, Bulacan), erected by the Dr. Jose P. Rizal Memorial Foundation
- Bulacan Military Area Memorial Park monument stands at Bustos, Bulacan and its historical marker was installed on August 2, 2012 by the National Historical Commission of the Philippines

== Bibliography ==
Filipinos in History: Volume IV, National Historical Institute (Manila, 1994)

Political offices
Preceded by Jose delos Reyes	Governor of Bulacan; 1945–1946	Succeeded by Arturo Samaniego
Preceded by Fortunato Halili	Governor of Bulacan; 1951–1957	Succeeded by Tomas Martin
Preceded by Macario Peralta, Jr.	Secretary of National Defense; 1959–1961	Succeeded by Jesus M. Vargas
House of Representatives of the Philippines
Preceded by Antonio Villarama	Representative, 2nd District of Bulacan; 1946–1953	Succeeded by Rogaciano M. Mercado
Party political offices
Preceded by Ferdinand Marcos	Nacionalista nominee for President of the Philippines; 1981	Vacant Title next held by Salvador Laurel
