= 1969 Philippine general election =

- November 11, 1969
- Presidential election
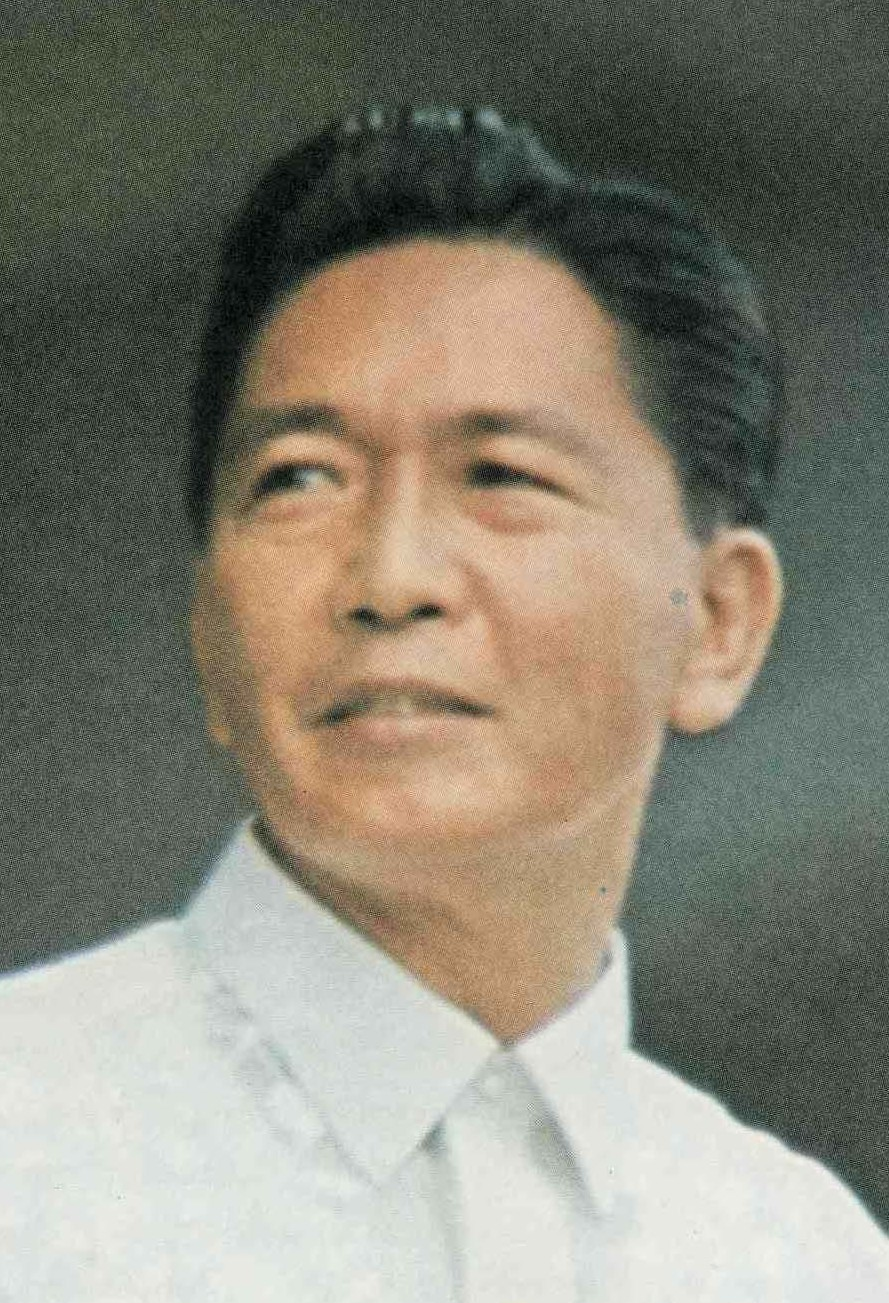

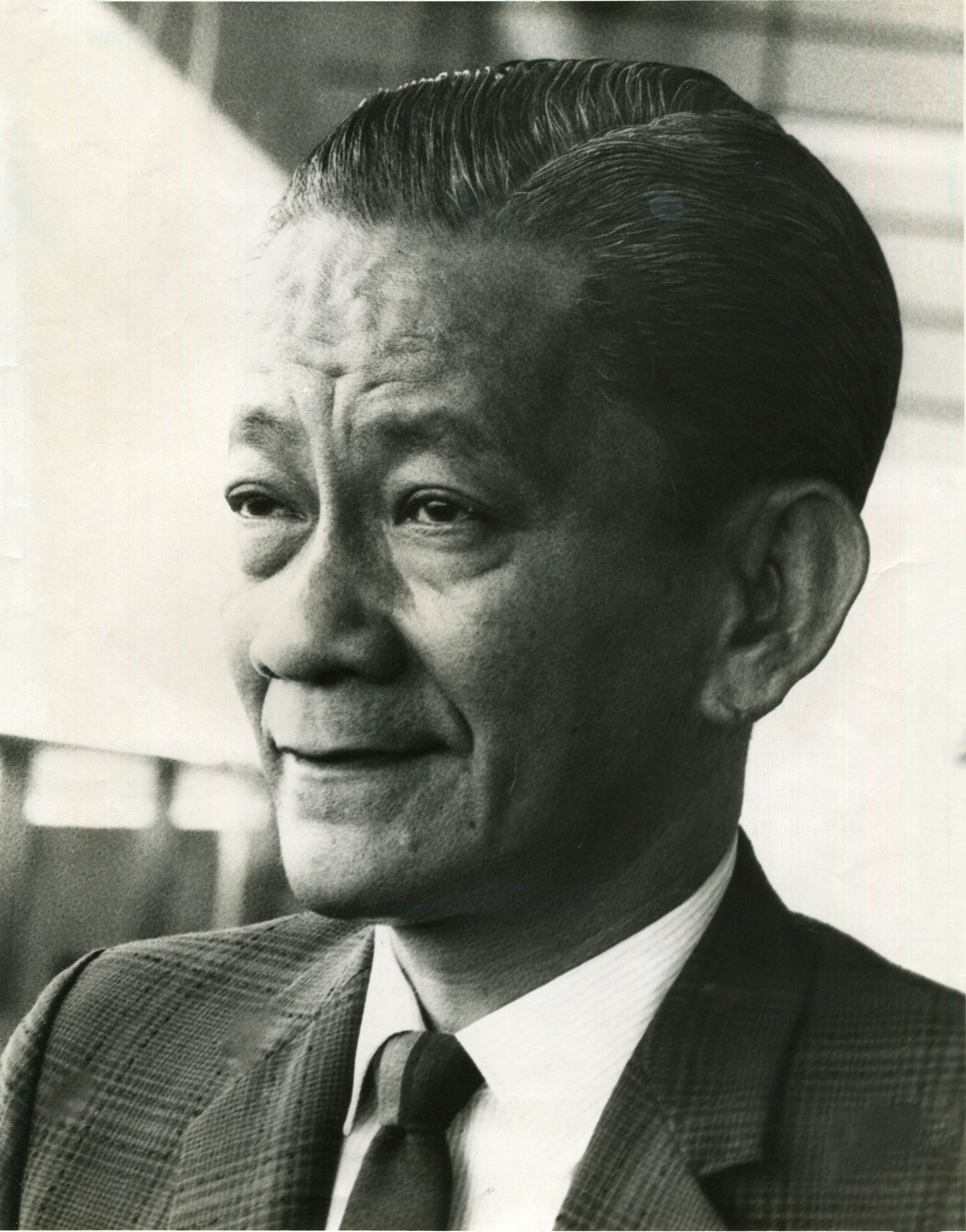
| Candidate | Ferdinand Marcos | Sergio Osmeña Jr. |
| Party | Nacionalista | Liberal |
| Running mate | Fernando Lopez | Genaro Magsaysay |
| Popular vote | 5,017,343 | 3,143,122 |
| Percentage | 61.47% | 38.51% |
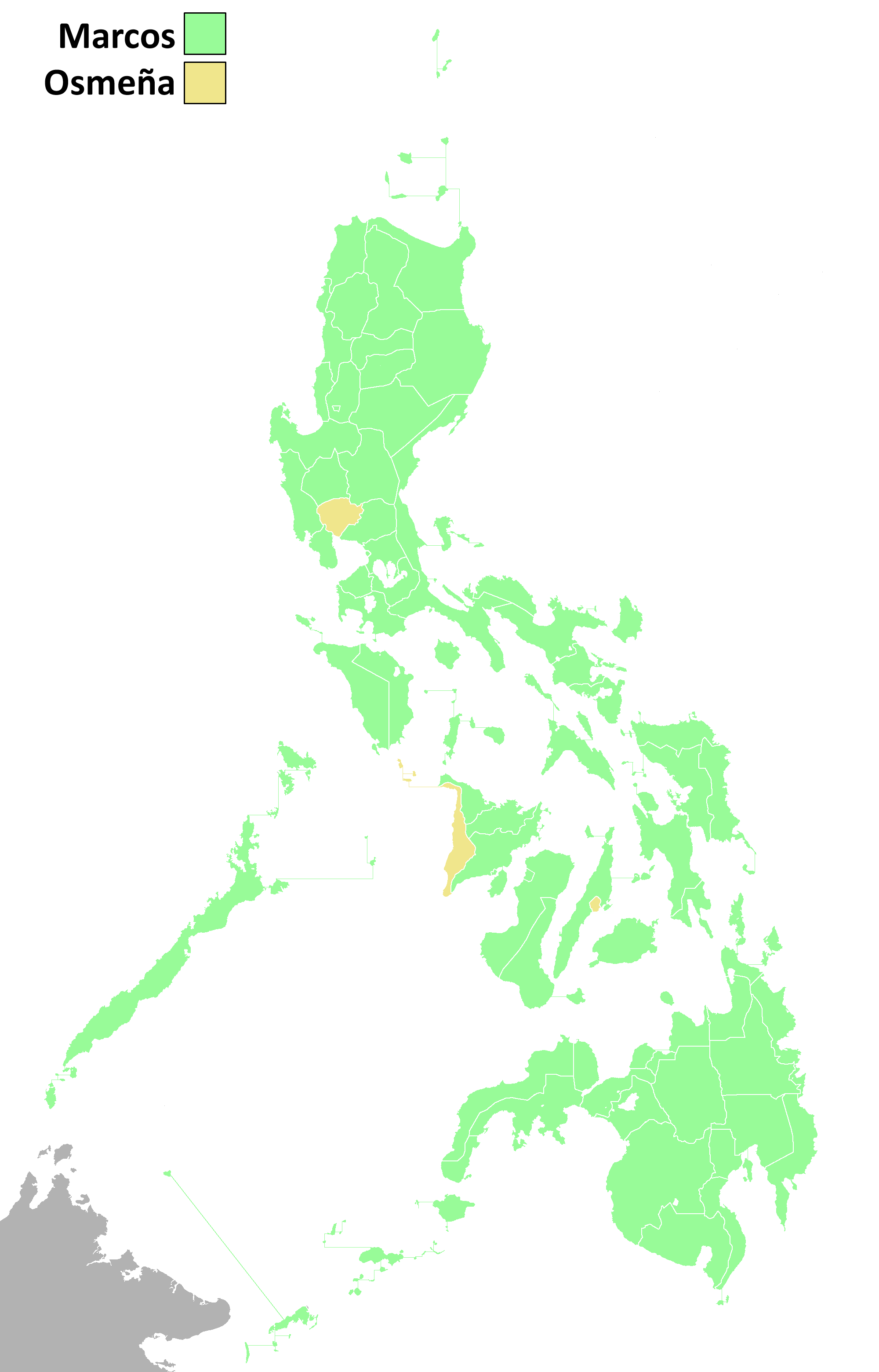
- Presidential election results per province.
President before election
Ferdinand Marcos
Nacionalista
Elected President
Ferdinand Marcos
Nacionalista
- Vice presidential election
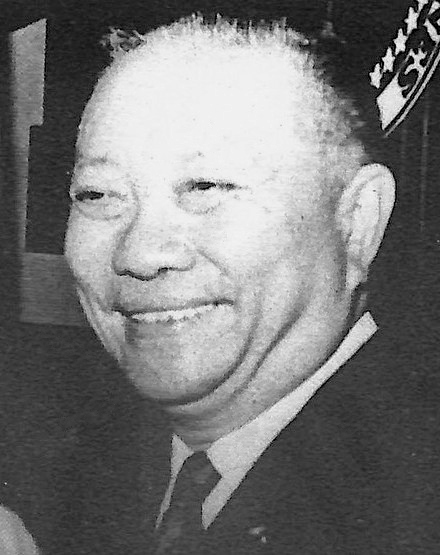

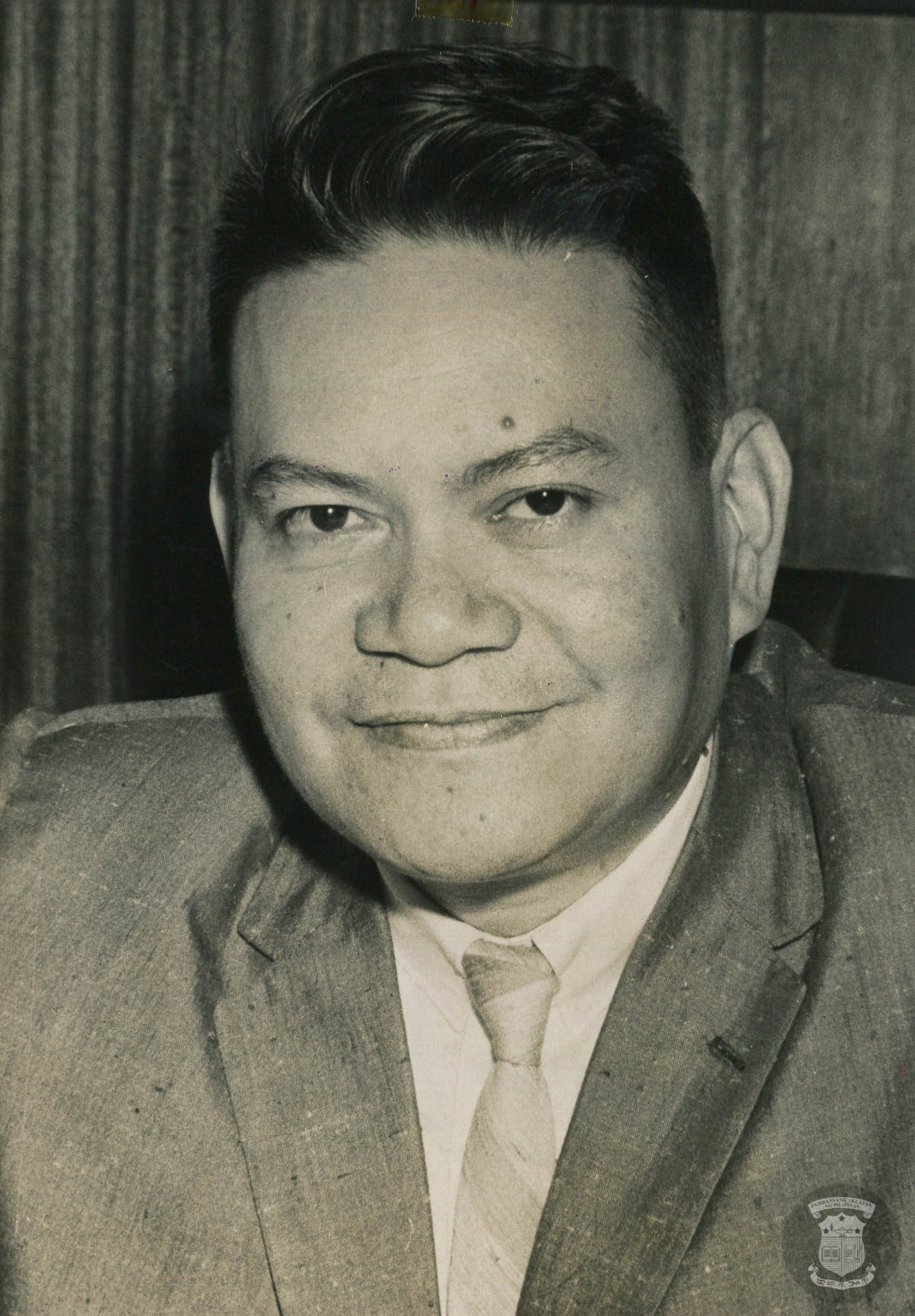
| Candidate | Fernando Lopez | Genaro Magsaysay |
| Party | Nacionalista | Liberal |
| Popular vote | 5,001,737 | 2,968,526 |
| Percentage | 62.75% | 37.24% |
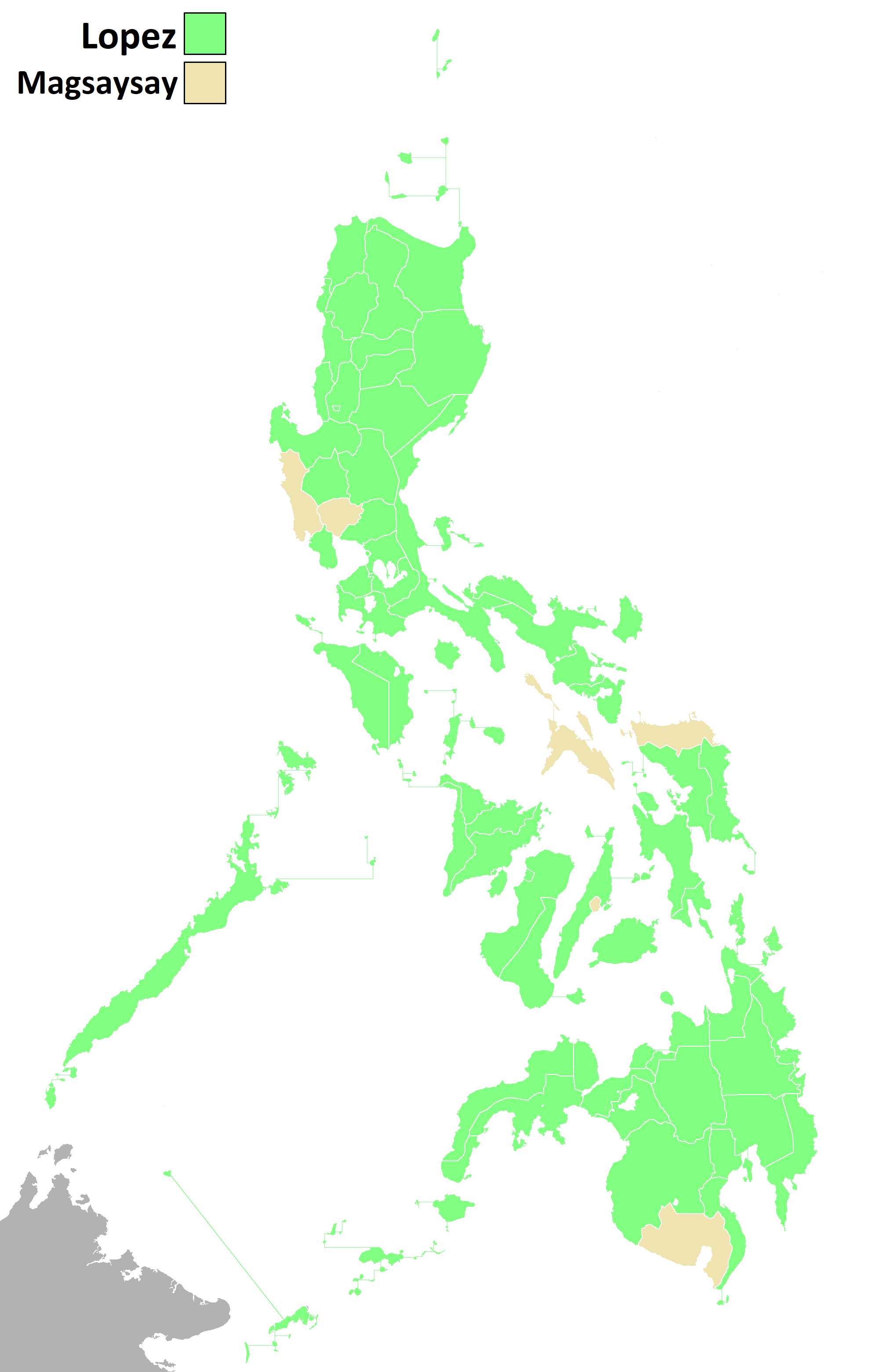
- Vice presidential election results per province.
Vice President before election
Fernando Lopez
Nacionalista
Elected Vice President
Fernando Lopez
Nacionalista
- Senate election

8 of the 24 seats in the Philippine Senate 13 needs for a majority
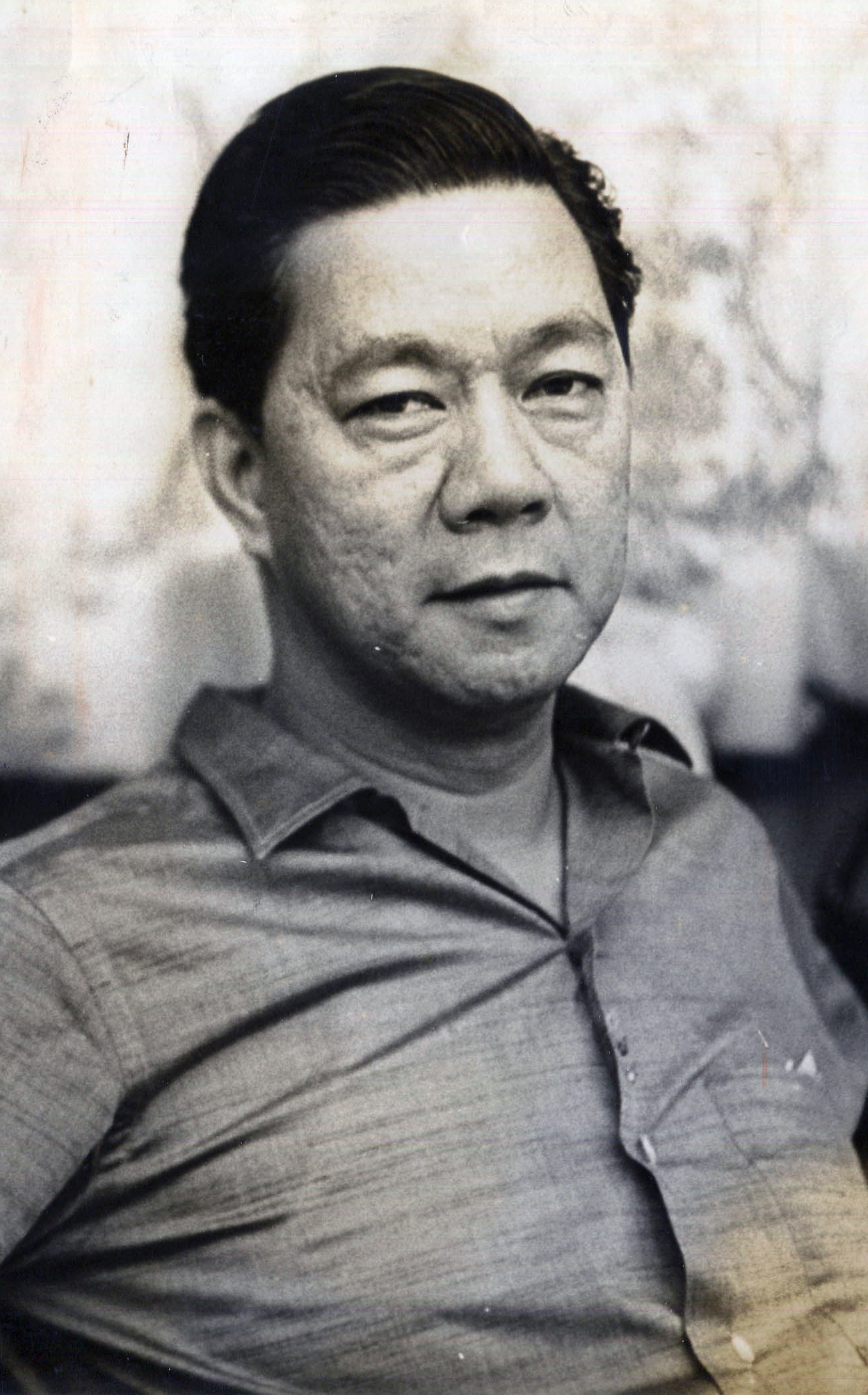

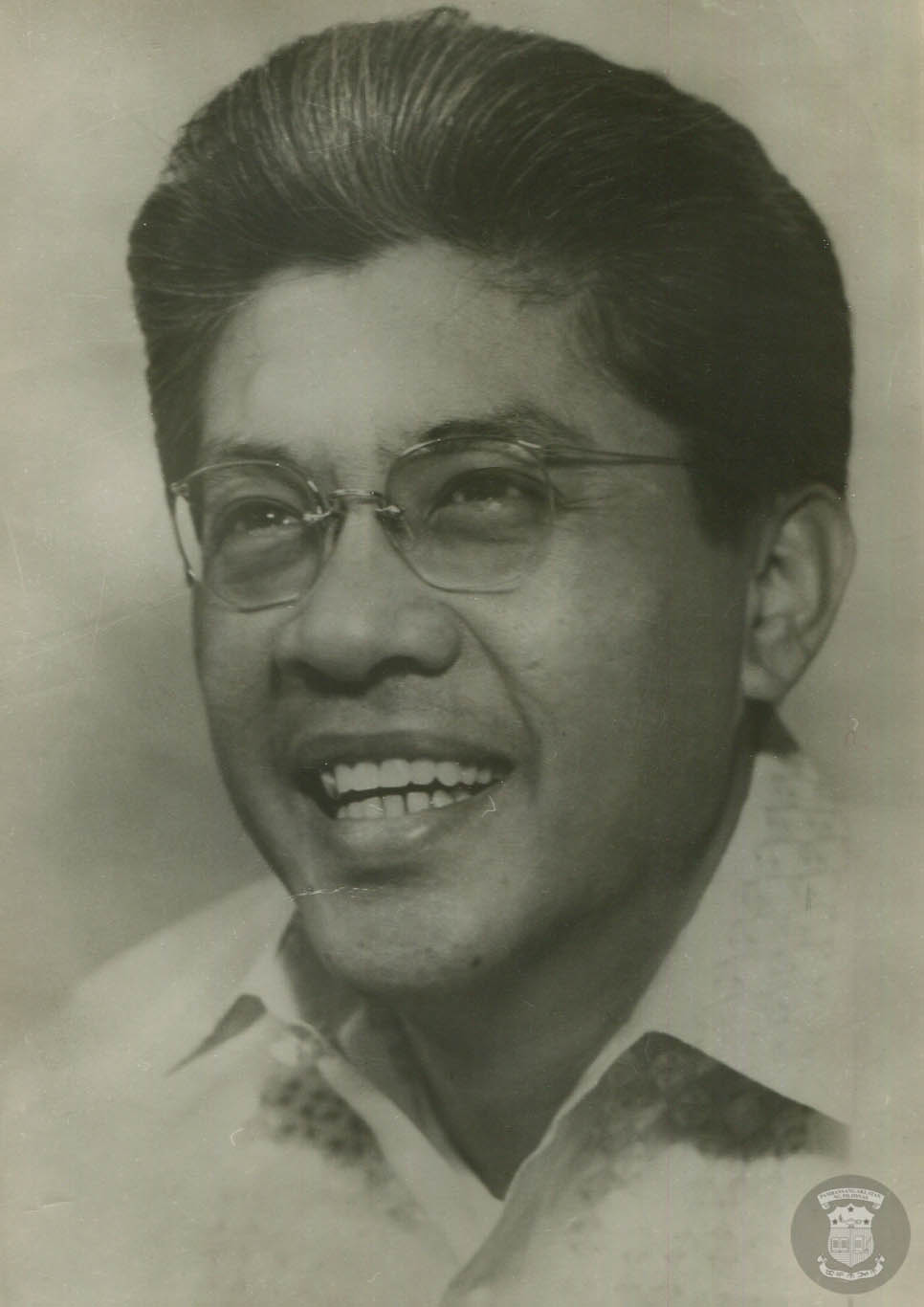
| | First party | Second party |
|---|---|---|
| Leader | Gil Puyat | Gerardo Roxas |
| Party | Nacionalista | Liberal |
| Seats before | 15 (4 up) | 8 (4 up) |
| Seats won | 6 | 2 |
| Seats after | 17 | 6 |
| Seat change | ▲2 | ▼2 |
| Popular vote | 31,526,492 | 22,256,444 |
| Percentage | 58.58 | 41.35 |
| Swing | ▲2.62 | ▲4.32 |
Senate President before election
Gil Puyat
Nacionalista
Elected Senate President
Gil Puyat
Nacionalista
- House elections

All 110 seats in the House of Representatives of the Philippines 56 seats needed for a majority
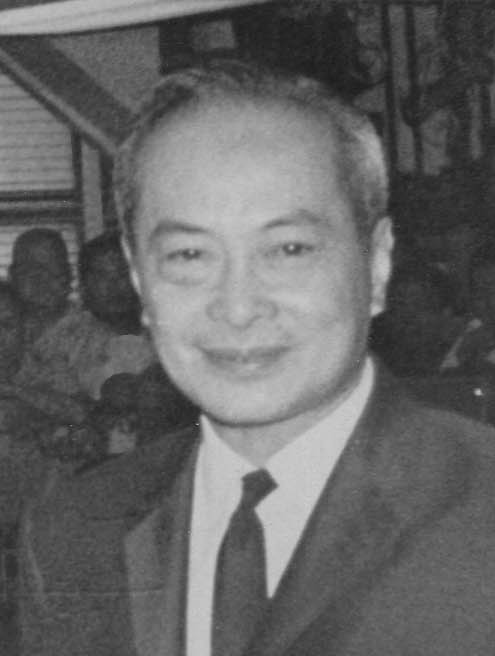

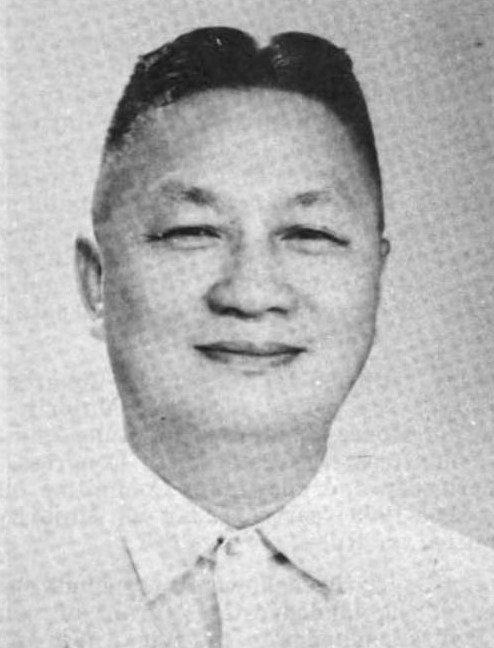
| | Majority party | Minority party |
|---|---|---|
| Leader | Jose Laurel, Jr. | Justiniano Montano |
| Party | Nacionalista | Liberal |
| Leader's seat | Capiz–2nd | Cavite |
| Last election | 38 seats, 41.76% | 61 seats, 51.32% |
| Seats won | 88 | 18 |
| Seat change | ▲50 | ▼43 |
| Popular vote | 4,590,374 | 2,641,786 |
| Percentage | 58.93 | 33.91 |
| Swing | ▲17.17 | ▼17.41 |
Speaker before election
Jose Laurel Jr.
Nacionalista
Elected Speaker
Jose Laurel Jr.
Nacionalista

Presidential, legislative and local elections were held in the Philippines on November 11, 1969. Incumbent President Ferdinand Marcos won an unprecedented second full term as President of the Philippines. Marcos was the last president in the entire electoral history who ran and won for a second term. His running mate, incumbent Vice President Fernando Lopez was also elected to a third full term as Vice President of the Philippines. An unprecedented twelve candidates ran for president, however ten of those were nuisance candidates.

== Results ==
=== President ===
| Candidate | Party | Votes | % |
|---|---|---|---|
| Ferdinand Marcos (incumbent) | Nacionalista Party | 5,017,343 | 62.24 |
| Sergio Osmeña Jr. | Liberal Party | 3,043,122 | 37.75 |
| Pascual Racuyal | Independent | 778 | 0.01 |
| Segundo Baldovi | Partido ng Bansa | 177 | 0.00 |
| Pantaleon H. Panelo | Independent | 123 | 0.00 |
| German F. Villanueva | Independent | 82 | 0.00 |
| Gaudencio Bueno | New Leaf Party | 44 | 0.00 |
| Angel Comagon | Independent | 35 | 0.00 |
| Cesar Bulacan | Independent | 31 | 0.00 |
| Espiridion D. Buencamino | NP | 23 | 0.00 |
| Nic V. Garces | Philippine Pro-Socialist Party | 23 | 0.00 |
| Benito Jose | Independent | 23 | 0.00 |
| Total | | 8,061,804 | 100.00 |
| Valid votes | | 8,061,804 | 98.28 |
| Invalid/blank votes | | 140,989 | 1.72 |
| Total votes | | 8,202,793 | 100.00 |
| Registered voters/turnout | | 10,300,898 | 79.63 |
Source: Nohlen, Grotz, Hartmann, Hasall and Santos

=== Vice president ===
| Candidate | Party | Votes | % |
|---|---|---|---|
| Fernando Lopez | Nacionalista Party | 5,001,737 | 62.75 |
| Genaro Magsaysay | Liberal Party | 2,968,526 | 37.24 |
| Victoriano Mallari | Partido ng Bansa | 229 | 0.00 |
| Modesto T. Jalandoni | Philippine Pro-Socialist Party | 161 | 0.00 |
| Total | | 7,970,653 | 100.00 |
| Valid votes | | 7,970,653 | 97.17 |
| Invalid/blank votes | | 232,140 | 2.83 |
| Total votes | | 8,202,793 | 100.00 |
| Registered voters/turnout | | 10,300,898 | 79.63 |
Source: Nohlen, Grotz, Hartmann, Hasall and Santos

=== Senate ===
Representation of results; seats contested are inside the box. Nacionalista Party Liberal Party Nationalist Citizens' Party

| Candidate | Party | Votes | % |
|---|---|---|---|
| Arturo Tolentino | Nacionalista Party | 4,826,809 | 58.84 |
| Gil Puyat | Nacionalista Party | 4,609,233 | 56.19 |
| Jose W. Diokno | Nacionalista Party | 4,566,353 | 55.67 |
| Lorenzo Sumulong | Nacionalista Party | 4,204,044 | 51.25 |
| Ambrosio Padilla | Liberal Party | 3,999,662 | 48.76 |
| Gerry Roxas | Liberal Party | 3,952,644 | 48.19 |
| Rene Espina | Nacionalista Party | 3,668,334 | 44.72 |
| Mamintal A. J. Tamano | Nacionalista Party | 3,458,193 | 42.16 |
| Rafael Palmares | Nacionalista Party | 3,393,677 | 41.37 |
| Eddie Ilarde | Liberal Party | 3,154,908 | 38.46 |
| Rodolfo Ganzon | Nacionalista Party | 2,799,849 | 34.13 |
| Tecla San Andres Ziga | Liberal Party | 2,742,113 | 33.43 |
| Juan Liwag | Liberal Party | 2,355,377 | 28.71 |
| Gaudencio Mañalac | Liberal Party | 2,250,665 | 27.44 |
| Manuel Cases Jr. | Liberal Party | 1,909,248 | 23.28 |
| Vincenzo Sagun | Liberal Party | 1,891,827 | 23.06 |
| Roger Nite | Partido Bagong Pilipino | 9,087 | 0.11 |
| Ernesto Hidalgo | New Party | 7,321 | 0.09 |
| Marcelina M. Angeles | Partido ng Bansa | 5,192 | 0.06 |
| Antonio Mendoza | National Liberal Party | 3,843 | 0.05 |
| Elsie Bawisan | Partido ng Bansa | 2,176 | 0.03 |
| Petronilo Cordero | Partido ng Bansa | 1,983 | 0.02 |
| Avelina Pulido | Partido ng Bansa | 1,837 | 0.02 |
| Tanni Ibarra | Partido ng Bansa | 1,624 | 0.02 |
| Tomas Talania | Partido ng Bansa | 1,477 | 0.02 |
| Mauro Macaso | Partido ng Bansa | 1,443 | 0.02 |
| Alejandro Gador | Partido ng Manggagawa/Labor Party | 1,440 | 0.02 |
| Estrada Jakosalem | New Leaf Party | 947 | 0.01 |
| Leopoldo Relayson | Partido ng Bansa | 793 | 0.01 |
| Total | | 53,822,099 | 100.00 |
| Total votes | | 8,202,793 | – |
| Registered voters/turnout | | 10,300,898 | 79.63 |

=== House of Representatives ===
| Party | Votes | % | +/– | Seats | +/– |
|---|---|---|---|---|---|
| Nacionalista Party | 4,590,374 | 58.93 | +17.17 | 88 | +50 |
| Liberal Party | 2,641,786 | 33.91 | −17.41 | 18 | −43 |
| Nacionalista Party (independent) | 129,424 | 1.66 | +0.67 | 2 | +1 |
| Liberal Party (independent) | 24,546 | 0.32 | −1.16 | 0 | −1 |
| Party for Philippine Progress | 5,031 | 0.06 | −0.52 | 0 | 0 |
| Young Philippines | 3,917 | 0.05 | −0.12 | 0 | 0 |
| Reformist Party | 43 | 0.00 | New | 0 | 0 |
| Independent | 394,700 | 5.07 | +1.37 | 2 | −1 |
| Total | 7,789,821 | 100.00 | – | 110 | +6 |
| Valid votes | 7,789,821 | 94.97 | −0.32 | | |
| Invalid/blank votes | 412,970 | 5.03 | +0.32 | | |
| Total votes | 8,202,791 | 100.00 | – | | |
| Registered voters/turnout | 10,300,898 | 79.63 | +3.24 | | |
Source: Nohlen, Grotz and Hartmann and Teehankee

== See also ==
- Commission on Elections
- Politics of the Philippines
- Philippine elections
- President of the Philippines
- 7th Congress of the Philippines
