= Jose Concepcion Maristela Sr. =

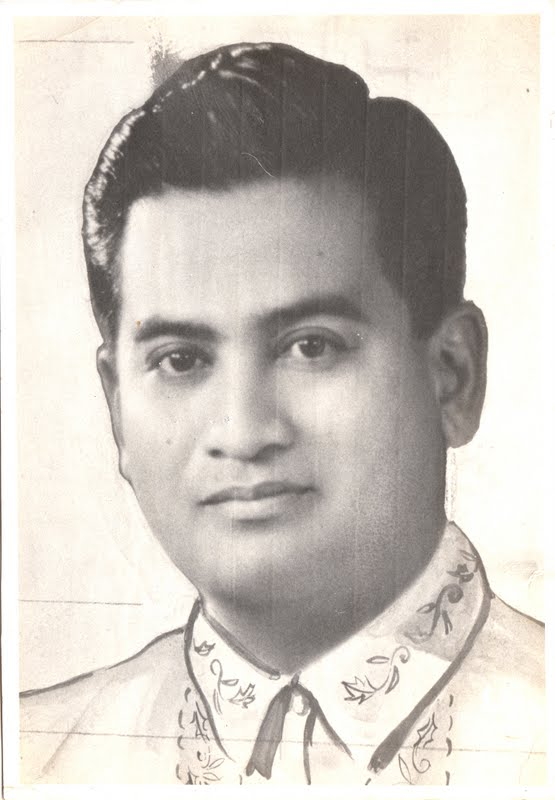
- Maristela c. 1940
- Born: February 4, 1916
- Died: June 1, 1979 (aged 63); Antipolo, Rizal, Philippines
- Spouse: Matilde Co
- Children: Jose Maristela Jr. Josephine Maristela; Evangeline Maristela; George Maristela
- Military career
- Allegiance: Philippines
- Branch: Philippine Constabulary
- Nicknames: Pepe, Joe

Jose "Pepe" Concepcion Maristela Sr. (February 4, 1916 – June 1, 1979) retired from the Philippine Military with the rank of General. Pepe Maristela, also referred to and known as Joe Maristela, held the rank of Colonel during active Military Duty. After his service in World War II, Maristela led the Philippine Constabulary as its chief. In 1963, he ran as the Liberal candidate for mayor of Caloocan, but lost to Macario Asistio Sr. of the Nacionalista Party. Maristela is the grandfather of Joe Maristela, an angel investor in healthcare technology in the U.S.

According to academic Mark R. Thompson, Maristela is responsible for preventing the assassination of Ferdinand Marcos in the early 1970s by the Workshop Group of Senator Sergio Osmeña Jr., Marcos' Liberal opponent in the 1969 Philippine presidential election.

== Early life ==
Maristela has roots in Pampanga as well as Tarlac, both provinces in the Philippines.

== Military career ==
Maristela graduated from the Philippine Military Academy. He was said to have had a "hot temper" and was reprimanded because of this on a number of occasions.

== Criminal investigation service and political career ==
Before entering into the CIS, in 1957, Maristela served as a Provincial Commander and Director of the Rizal Police Provincial Office.

Beginning in January 1962, Maristela headed the Criminal Investigation Service (CIS) in the Philippines. Maristela was said to have appointed many "special agents" during his tenure heading the CIS.

In 1963, president Diosdado Macapagal formally announced to the country that Maristela would be running as the Liberal Party candidate for mayor in the City of Caloocan.

After retiring from the CIS, Maristela engaged in intelligence-gathering for Malacañang (Office of the President). According to historian Joseph Scalice, who cited academic Mark R. Thompson, Maristela managed to become a mole within the Workshop Group, formed by defeated Liberal presidential candidate Sergio Osmeña Jr. around the time of the 1969 election, and inform president Marcos of the group's covert plans in the early 1970s to assassinate him using foreign contract killers.

Maristela died on June 1, 1979, at his home in Antipolo, Philippines.
