= Concession (politics) =

Losing candidate publicly acknowledging they lost an election

In politics, a concession is the act of a losing candidate publicly yielding to a winning candidate after an election after the overall result of the vote has become clear. A concession speech is usually made after an election.

== United States ==
=== History ===
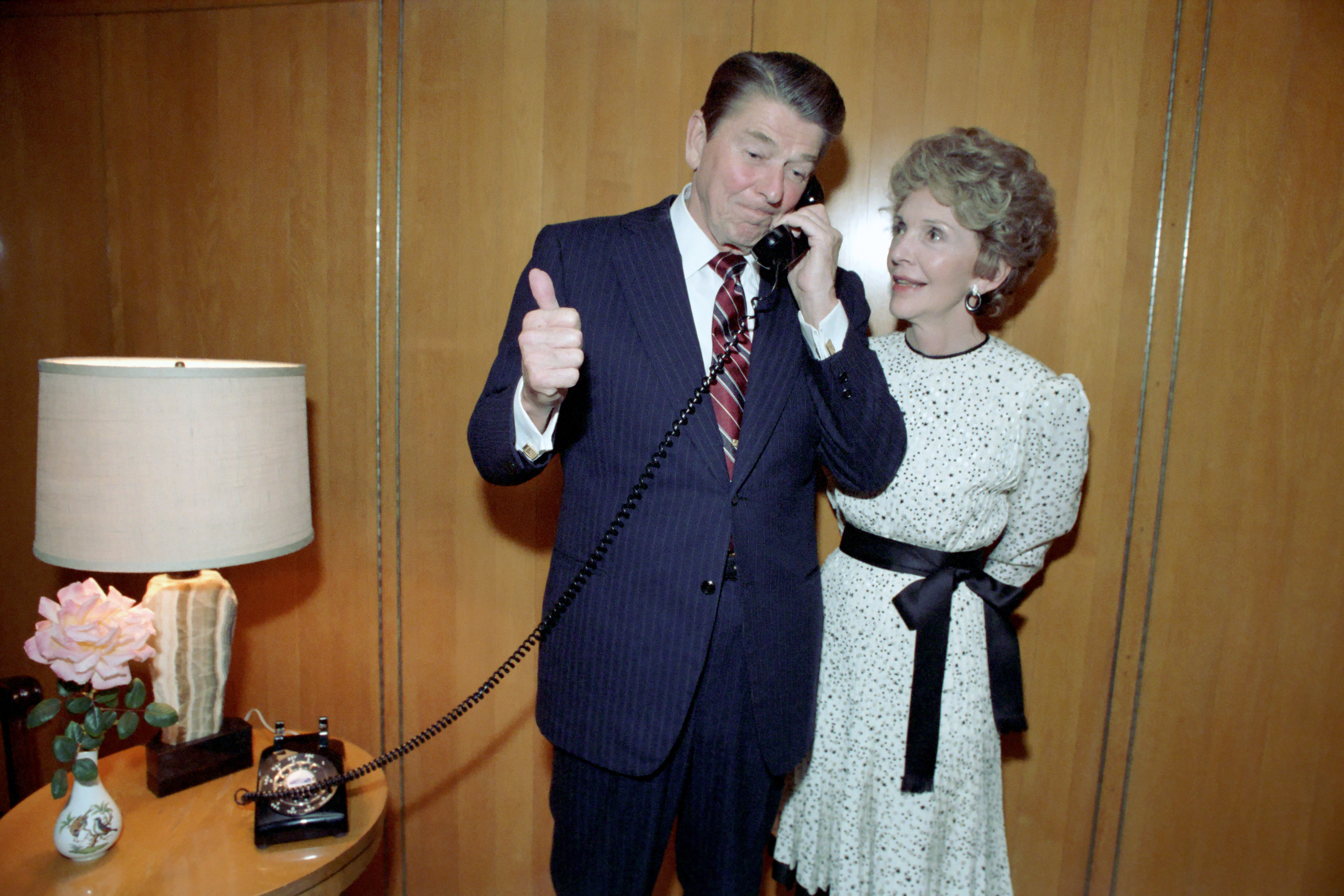
Ronald Reagan receiving a concession phone call from Walter Mondale after the 1984 United States presidential election.

The first time in the United States that a candidate lost a presidential election and privately conceded was Federalist John Adams to Democratic-Republican Thomas Jefferson in 1800. In 1860, Northern Democrat Stephen Douglas conceded to Republican Abraham Lincoln with the words: 'Partisan feeling must yield to patriotism. I'm with you, Mr. President, and God bless you.' However, during the country's first century, a public concession was the exception rather than the rule.

The first "concession telegram" occurred when William Jennings Bryan sent William McKinley a message two days after the 1896 US presidential election. Prior to that election, results took many days to be processed and made public, and thus candidates maintained an air of detachment from the process. The telegram was rather brief and read as follows:

Lincoln, Neb., November 5.

Hon. Wm. McKinley, Canton, Ohio: Senator Jones has just informed me that the returns indicate your election, and I hasten to extend my congratulations. We have submitted the issue to the American people and their will is law.

W.J. Bryan

Over time, concession speeches were introduced aimed at the electorate, especially one's own supporters. These were first broadcast on the radio by Al Smith in 1928, on a newsreel by Wendell Willkie in 1940, and on live television by Adlai Stevenson II in 1952. In the period between the 1896 and 2016 presidential elections, there had been 32 concessions speeches by major party candidates over the course of 120 years.

=== Template ===
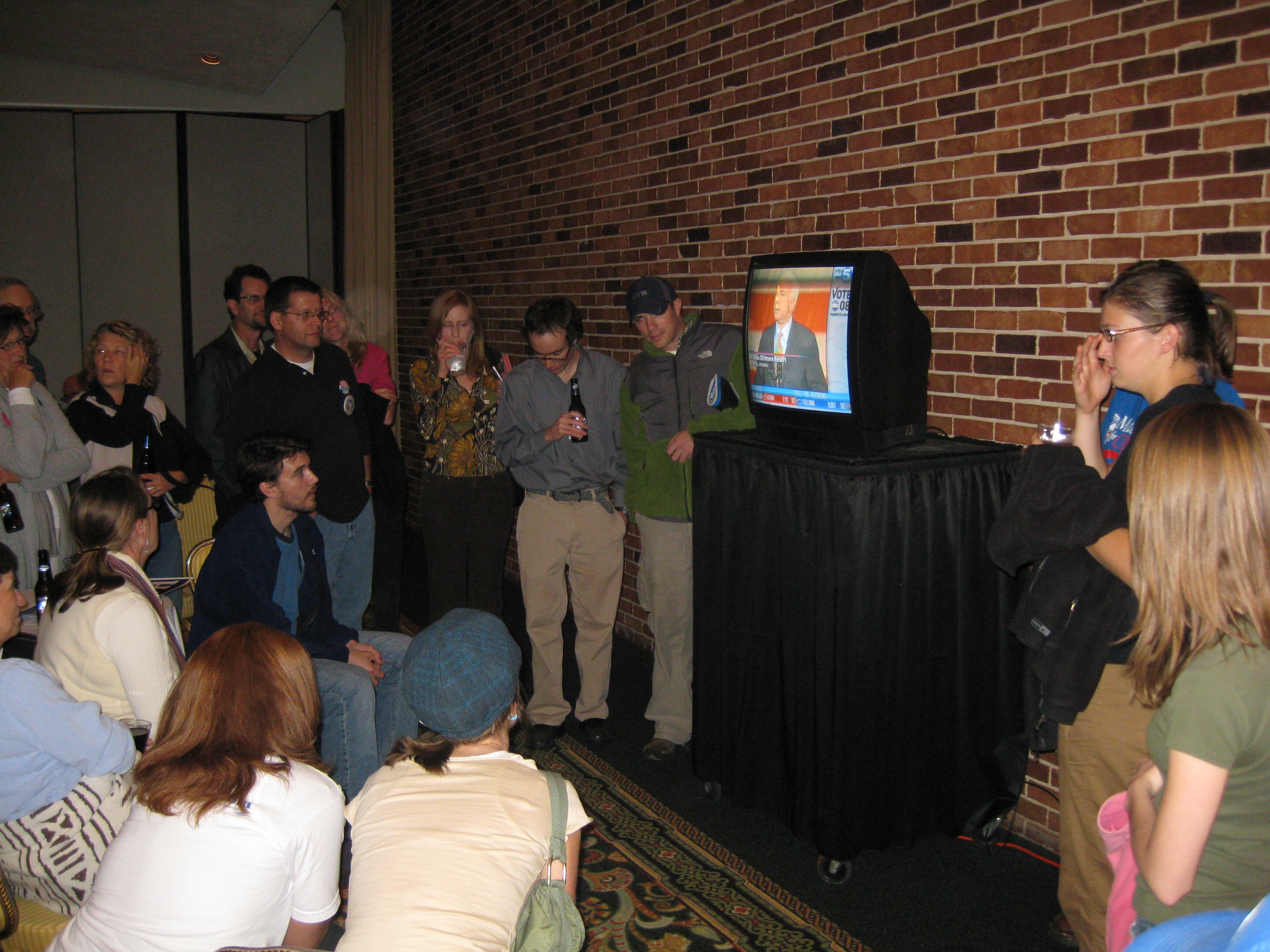
Democrats quietly watch John McCain's 2008 concession speech.

In modern U.S. elections (presidential or otherwise), a concession is usually a two-step process: first, the losing candidate makes a concession phone call to the winning candidate and congratulates them personally; second, the losing candidate makes a televised public speech, known as a concession speech, to their supporters, on an (improvised) podium surrounded by the candidate for the vice presidency, their spouses or other important relatives and friends. The concession speech consists of four elements:

1. The statement of defeat: an admission that the candidate has lost the election to their opponent, who is congratulated on their victory.
2. The call to unite: an expression of support for the victor's upcoming term in office, and a call for unity under their leadership, necessary after an often divisive and polarizing election campaign.
3. The celebration of democracy: a reflection on why democracy and the participation of millions of voters in the electoral process is important, and that their choice should be respected.
4. The vow to continue the fight: a reminder of the importance of the issues the candidate has raised during the campaign, and the policies their party advocates for. The candidate says that these remain important goals to strive toward, promises to continue fighting for them, and urges their supporters to do the same.

A losing candidate often thanks their supporters for their valiant efforts and points to the non-electoral successes of the campaign. Defeated candidates might also congratulate the winning candidate or offer a parting word of advice. The speech could be brief or last for minutes, with variation in how lighthearted they present their loss, and how warmly they congratulate the winner. In the broadcast age, the concession speech of a candidate for high office reaches a wide audience and is seen as the final swan song of a lost campaign. By publicly and honestly admitting defeat, the candidate is deemed to gain honor.

Republican John McCain's 2008 concession speech after losing to Democrat Barack Obama is frequently cited as a model of courtesy and grace: he called it his "honor" to congratulate Obama on being "elected the next president of the country that we both love" and applauded Obama's milestone as the first African American to win the office. In contrast, Republican Richard Nixon's press conference after losing the 1962 California gubernatorial race to Democrat Pat Brown was notorious for its grudging tone: "You won't have Nixon to kick around anymore," he told reporters.

After the 2026 midterm elections, The New York Times suggested that the tradition of concession calls was eroding, "the latest norm of polite politics to become a casualty of a less civil age". It noted that Donald Trump had refused to concede the 2020 presidential election; Mike Rogers did not call Abdul El-Sayed to concede the 2026 Michigan U.S. Senate election; and Amy Acton refused to take Vivek Ramaswamy's concession call after the 2026 Ohio gubernatorial election, citing an ad run by his campaign featuring her estranged mother calling her a liar.

=== Timing of concession ===
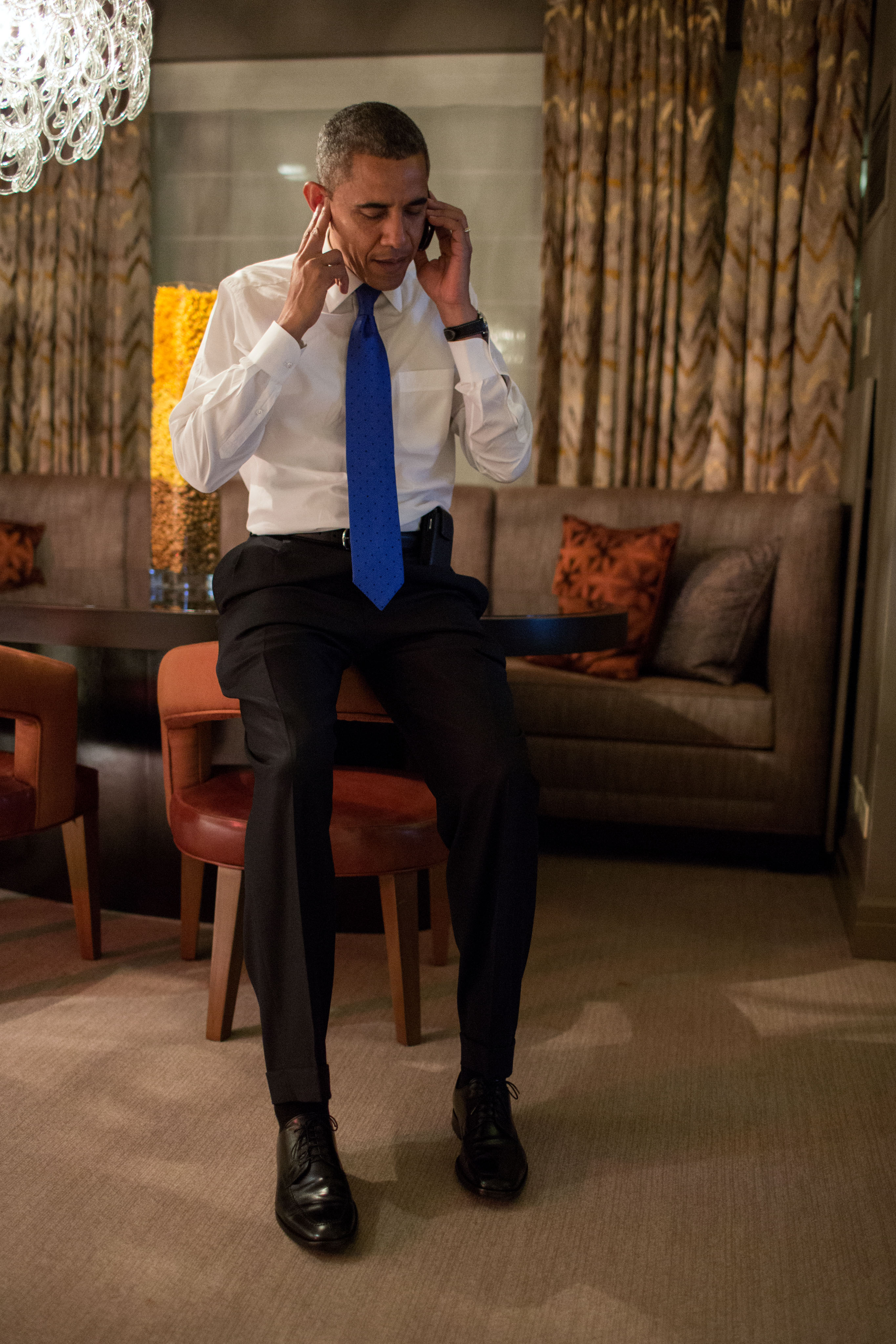
Obama takes Romney's concession call.

Romney gets ready for his 2012 concession speech, cheered on by his supporters one last time.

Out of courtesy, the winner of the campaign usually waits for a concession speech, if one is forthcoming, before delivering the acceptance speech. A losing candidate commonly offers a private concession directly to the winning candidate, usually by telephone, before making a public announcement.

In American history, the losing candidate usually made their concession speech a few hours after midnight when the outcome was clear. It's possible for a candidate to believe they have already lost or to do their political allies a disservice by making their concession too early. When Jimmy Carter made his concession speech in 1980, he either forgot or ignored the fact that polling places on the West Coast were still open; many Democratic voters seeing or hearing about the concession speech were too demoralized to still bring out their vote for Carter and Democratic senatorial candidates, who possibly lost a seat due to this last-minute lower Democratic voter turnout.

If the vote is relatively close, it can be unclear when it is appropriate for a losing candidate to concede an election. On election night, pressures from a media looking for news to report, an opposition campaign anxious to declare victory, and one's own campaign unwilling to concede defeat if there is any hope of a last-minute turnaround are all factors in the decision of the losing candidate.

One of the slowest concessions ever in American history was in 1916, when the counting took days and Republican Charles Evans Hughes was initially reported to be the winner by several newspapers, because he had a large lead over incumbent Democrat Woodrow Wilson. However, when all the votes were counted, Wilson had carried several key states and won re-election. Some Republicans cried foul, but Hughes calmed his supporters, saying 'in the absence of absolute proof of fraud, no such cry should be raised to becloud the title of the next president of the United States'. After two weeks, Wilson's narrow win was confirmed, and Hughes sent him a gracious telegram with congratulations.

It is exceedingly rare for a concession, once issued, to be retracted; such an event occurred in the 2000 presidential election, when Democrat Al Gore telephoned Republican George W. Bush on November 8 to concede the election. Gore was apparently unaware of the close vote count in the state of Florida, and when he realized it, he proceeded to cancel his concession address, and retracted his concession call. After a legal challenge that lasted 35 days, in which the Supreme Court ruled that Bush had won, Gore conceded a second time on December 13, 2000, this time with a concession speech. He began by saying, somewhat jokingly: 'Good evening. Just moments ago, I spoke with George W. Bush and congratulated him on becoming the 43rd President of the United States, and I promised him I wouldn't call him back this time.'

=== Importance ===
Excerpts from Hillary Clinton's 2016 concession speech

A concession, usually in the form of a concession speech, is considered a matter of courtesy and a gracious celebration of American democracy that helps with the peaceful transition of power, although there is no legal or constitutional need for it. However, when election campaigns have been very polarized and the race close, conceding one's loss was important in order to get the losing candidate's supporters to accept the outcome and ensure social and political stability in any form. Failing to urge one's own supporters toward reconciliation will let embitterment remain between supporters of both candidates, who need to live and work together in the same country for the next four years under a president, whose office term is not fully accepted by almost half of the population. This is why John McCain was commended for calming down his supporters who booed when he first mentioned the name of his opponent Barack Obama in his concession speech, and managed to have them applaud for their opponent later in his speech.

=== Refusal to concede ===
==== Presidential elections ====
After an unexpected defeat in the 1916 election, Republican Charles Evans Hughes waited two weeks before sending a concession telegram to President Woodrow Wilson. Upon receiving it, Wilson joked that it was "a little moth-eaten when it got here but still quite legible."

After losing the 1944 election, Republican Thomas E. Dewey conceded publicly in a radio address the following morning, but declined to personally call or send a telegram to President Franklin D. Roosevelt. This irritated Roosevelt, who sent Dewey a telegram reading, "I thank you for your statement, which I heard over the air a few minutes ago."

In the 1960 election, Republican Richard M. Nixon considered refusing to concede to his Democratic opponent John F. Kennedy and challenging the results in Illinois and Texas because of allegations of voter fraud in those states. However, he found that the United States had no legal framework for a losing candidate to challenge an election and decided that a lengthy constitutional crisis would destabilize the country and weaken its international standing, as well as damage Nixon's own political reputation.

In the 2000 election, Al Gore conceded to Bush and then on November 8, retracted his concession and refused to acknowledge Bush as the winner for over a month until the Supreme Court in a 5–4 decision, ruled in Bush v. Gore that certified George W. Bush as the winner of the closely called state of Florida. This was the longest refusal to concede of any modern presidential candidate until the 2020 election. On the night of the 2004 election, Democratic John Kerry also considered waiting to concede to Bush pending a challenge of the results in Ohio, but ultimately decided against a potential repeat of the contentious events of 2000.

Donald Trump has been an exception to the tradition of concession in American presidential politics, refusing to concede defeat and declaring victory for himself despite having lost both the popular vote and electoral college in the 2020 presidential election. He has alleged that there has been electoral fraud or miscounts in close races which negatively impacted him, despite there being no evidence of this according to election officials and media outlets. A candidate has the right to mount legal challenges against the electoral process if they have evidence that it was conducted improperly, and potentially they could thus subvert the outcome. If these legal challenges to the electoral processes fail and the losing candidate still refuses to concede, the winning candidate nevertheless starts their presidential term on January 20 (and if the losing candidate is the incumbent president, their term will end on the same day), in accordance with the Twentieth Amendment. On January 7, 2021, in what some news outlets have regarded as a concession despite lacking any admission of defeat, Trump condemned the attack on the United States Capitol and proceeded to say that his focus is to ensure a smooth transition of power to the Biden administration (without mentioning Biden's name).

If the incumbent president refuses to concede the election, the General Services Administration (GSA) may delay the transition process, as it did following both the 2000 election and 2020 election. The GSA has to "ascertain" the election in order to release funds, office space, briefings, and other government resources needed for a transition.

==== Gubernatorial elections ====
Republican Jim Ross Lightfoot did not concede his loss in the 1998 Iowa gubernatorial election, won by Democrat Tom Vilsack.

In the 2018 Georgia gubernatorial election, Democrat Stacey Abrams did not concede to Republican Brian Kemp, despite acknowledging him as governor-elect. Her refusal to concede has drawn comparisons to Trump's refusal to concede his loss in Georgia, though Abrams rejected such comparisons.

In the 2022 Arizona gubernatorial election, Republican Kari Lake did not concede to Democrat Katie Hobbs and had filed lawsuits against the state's largest county Maricopa, citing voting irregularities.

==== Senate elections ====
After losing the 2017 United States Senate special election in Alabama, Republican Roy Moore refused to concede defeat to Democrat Doug Jones. On December 27, 2017, Moore filed a lawsuit to block Jones from being certified as the winner of the race. However, the lawsuit was rejected by the Alabama Supreme Court, who declared Jones the winner.

After the 2026 Michigan U.S. Senate race, Democrat Abdul El-Sayed said Republican Mike Rogers had not called him to concede. The race had been combative, with Rogers repeatedly attempting to tie El-Sayed to the Muslim Brotherhood without evidence and El-Sayed saying voters had rejected a "hateful, spiteful campaign". Rogers had released a written statement that thanked supporters but did not mention El-Sayed.

== Other countries ==
=== Belgium ===
Not all countries have a formality or tradition of concession speeches, especially not in multi-party systems, where there may be multiple candidates, and the election results are not necessarily as binary as in two-party systems, and sometimes candidates represent their parties more than themselves. For example, when the Parti Socialiste lost 5 seats in Parliament and became the second-largest Francophone party out of five in the 2007 Belgian federal election, party leader Elio Di Rupo described his concession on behalf of his party as follows: 'We had lost, and I have quickly acknowledged our defeat. I had never suffered an electoral defeat before, but I had been preparing for it, and I knew we would end up in the opposition benches. When I came into the television studio, I conceded our defeat. During earlier victories, I never humiliated the losers. That's just how democracy works: you win some, you lose some.'

=== New Zealand ===
In the New Zealand political system, because of mixed-member proportional representation, it is difficult for one party to win enough seats to govern alone and there are examples of concession speeches not being given until coalitions are confirmed. These negotiations can take several days or even weeks. For example, after the 2017 New Zealand general election ended in a hung parliament both the centre-left New Zealand Labour Party and the centre-right New Zealand National Party looked for a coalition with NZ First, a right-wing populist party led by Winston Peters. With almost 46% of the vote counted on election night it was looking promising for the National Party and their leader Bill English, was confident that he would form the coalition with NZ First and be able to govern. On the night, however, the leader of the Labour Party, Jacinda Ardern said she was hoping for a better result and had phoned Bill English, with both agreeing that neither of them would decide the outcome. The battle was close and early in the evening Ardern said she took responsibility for Labour's 10-point loss at that stage, but ended her address on a positive note, neither confirming or conceding. Almost three weeks later, NZ First backed a Labour-led coalition. English immediately conceded and paid tribute to his opponent saying "Ms Ardern did a remarkable job in turning around the party after such a short time in the role, and said he hoped the incoming government took the opportunity provided by the 'pretty good shape' of the economy". In the 2020 New Zealand general election, the Ardern-led Labour Party did win enough seats to govern alone, and the leader of the National Party, Judith Collins, promptly rang Ardern and congratulated her on an "excellent result for the Labour Party".

=== Peru ===
Following the 2021 Peruvian general election, Popular Force leader Keiko Fujimori, daughter of former Peruvian President Alberto Fujimori, refused to concede defeat to socialist Free Peru candidate Pedro Castillo. She has alleged that there were voting irregularities, which has been rejected by the Organization of American States. She has also attempted to challenge the results, which has drawn comparisons to Trump's attempts to overturn the election. On July 19, Fujimori admitted defeat but reiterated her claim that Castillo's party "have stolen thousands of votes from us".

=== Philippines ===
Senator Sergio Osmeña Jr. never conceded defeat to Ferdinand Marcos after the latter won reelection in the 1969 Philippine presidential election.

Actor Fernando Poe Jr. did not concede to Gloria Macapagal Arroyo after the 2004 Philippine presidential election, and subsequently put the result of the election under protest. Poe later died in December 2004, still not conceding his defeat.

In 2010, Joseph Estrada conceded to Benigno Aquino III after the latter became president-elect. Estrada, who was second place in the election, was the last candidate to concede, with all other of Aquino's opponents conceding prior to the certification of results a month after the actual election.

In the 2016 election, Mar Roxas conceded to Rodrigo Duterte the day after the election. Roxas, who ultimately finished second, was the second candidate to concede, after Grace Poe (Fernando Poe Jr.'s daughter).

=== United Kingdom ===
Following the 2015 general election, Labour Party leader, Ed Miliband telephoned the Conservative Party leader and Prime Minister, David Cameron to concede defeat and then announced his resignation.

Following the 2024 General Election, the then Prime Minister, Rishi Sunak, conceded defeat to the Labour Party Leader, Keir Starmer, at the declaration at Sunak's seat of Richmond and Northallerton. In a speech following the declaration, Sunak stated that the Labour Party had won the election and that he had called Starmer to congratulate him.

== See also ==
- 2020 United States presidential election#Late counting
