= 1969 Philippine presidential election =

9th Philippine presidential election

- November 11, 1969
- Turnout: 79.6% (▲3.2pp)
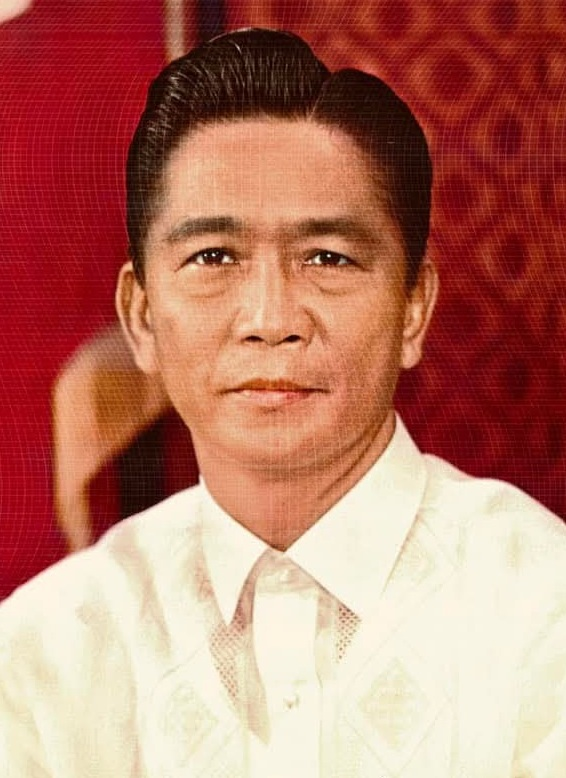

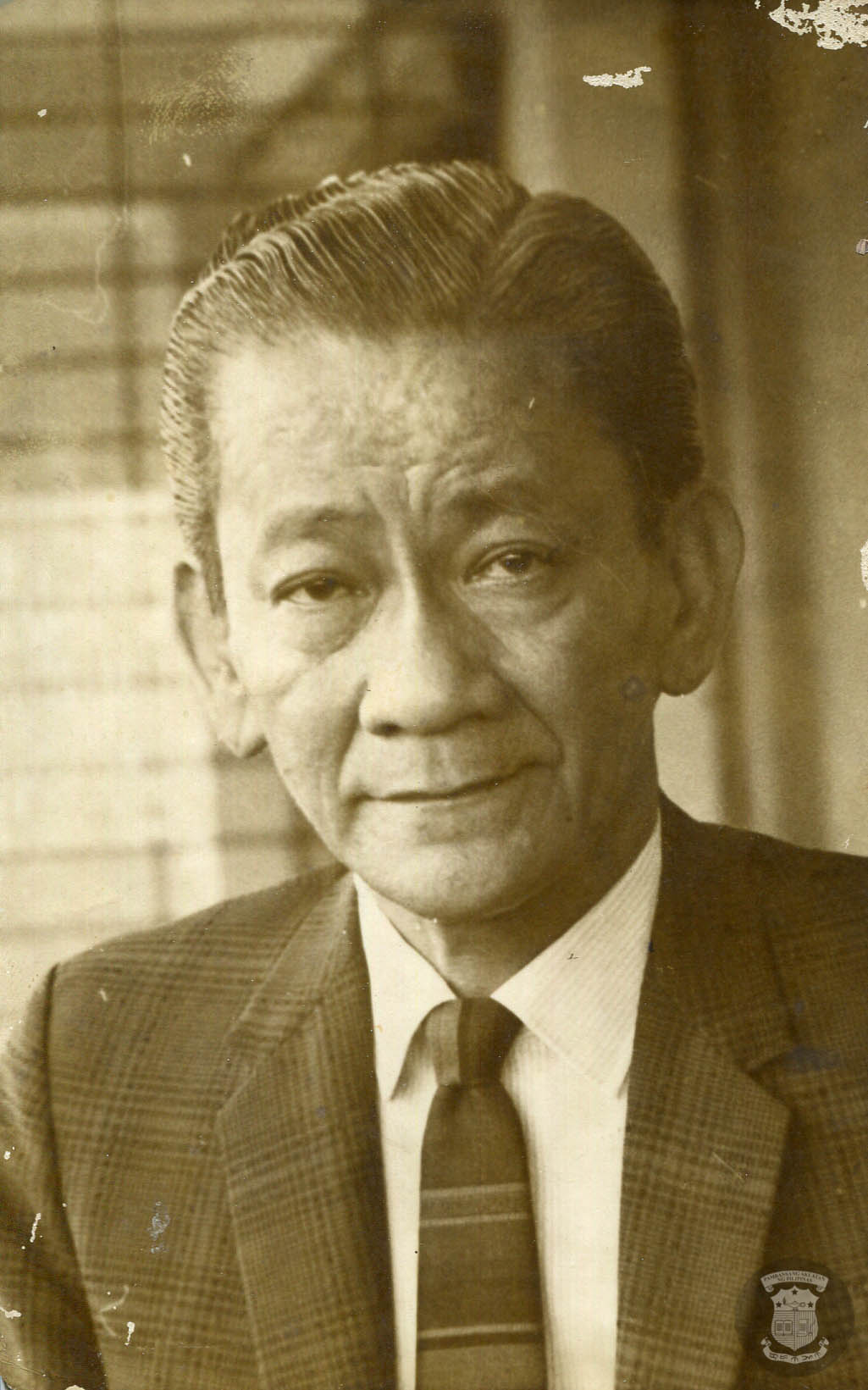
Candidate	Ferdinand Marcos	Sergio Osmeña Jr.
Party	Nacionalista	Liberal
Running mate	Fernando Lopez	Genaro Magsaysay
Popular vote	5,017,343	3,143,122
Percentage	61.47%	38.51%
- Presidential election results per province.
President before election
Ferdinand Marcos
Nacionalista
Elected President
Ferdinand Marcos
Nacionalista
- 1969 Philippine vice presidential election
- November 11, 1969
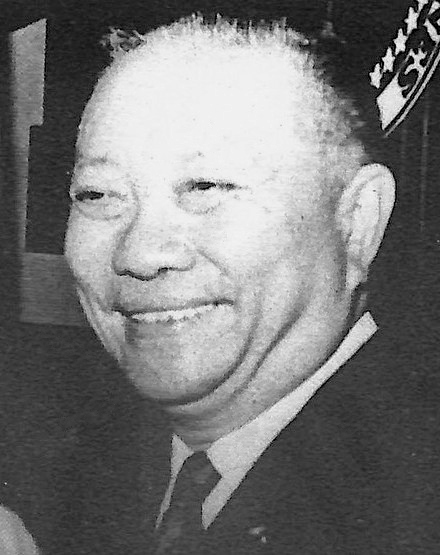

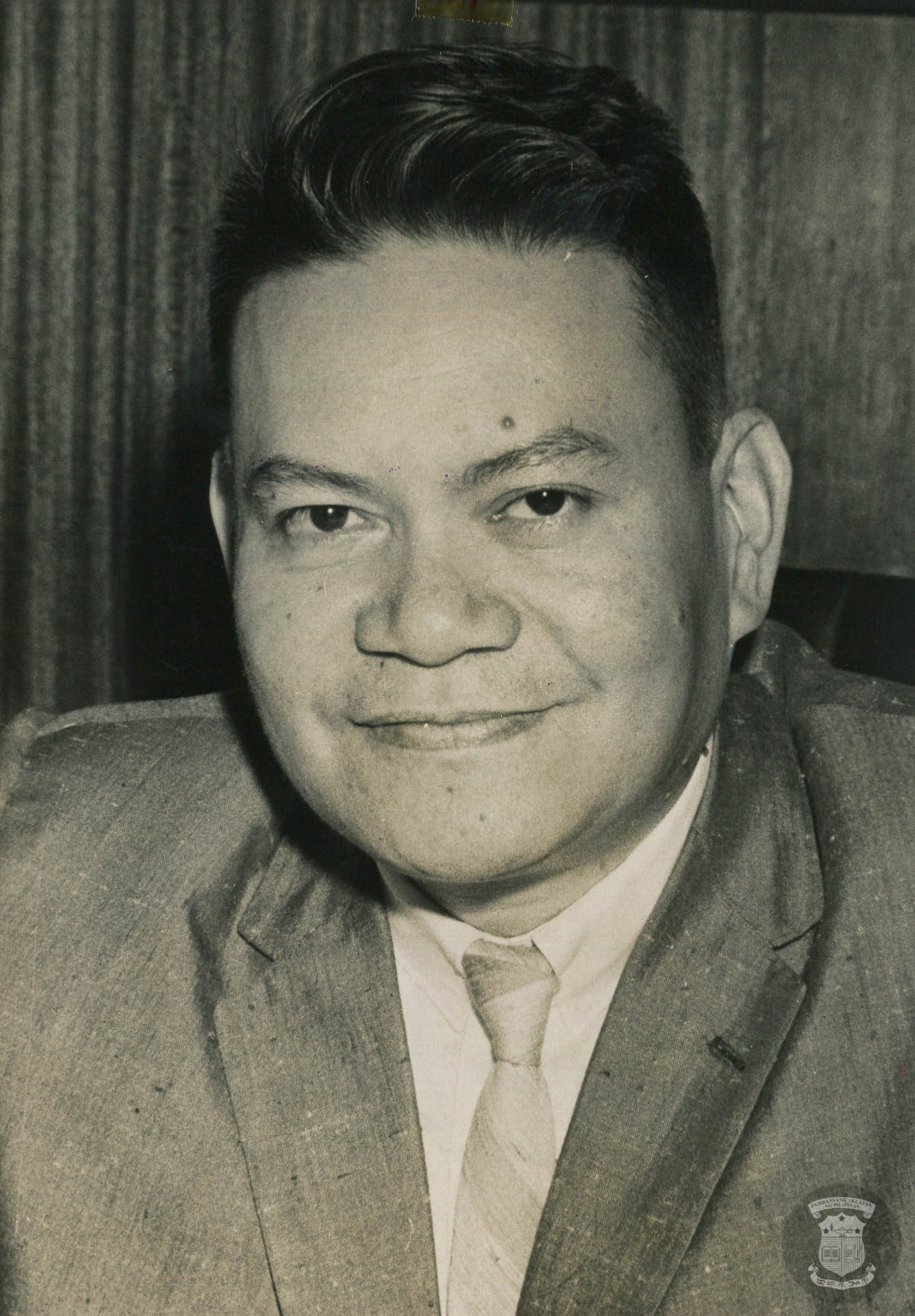
Candidate	Fernando Lopez	Genaro Magsaysay
Party	Nacionalista	Liberal
Popular vote	5,001,737	2,968,526
Percentage	62.75%	37.24%
- Vice presidential election results per province.
Vice President before election
Fernando Lopez
Nacionalista
Elected Vice President
Fernando Lopez
Nacionalista

Presidential and vice presidential elections were held in the Philippines were held on November 11, 1969. Incumbent Nacionalista President Ferdinand Marcos was reelected to a second term, defeating Liberal Sergio Osmeña Jr., senator and former Cebu City mayor. Marcos was the last president in the entire electoral history of the Philippines who ran for and won a second term. His running mate, incumbent Vice President Fernando Lopez, was also elected to a third full term as Vice President of the Philippines. A total of twelve candidates ran for president, but ten of those got less than 0.01% of the vote. Despite Marcos' win, Osmeña never conceded defeat.

Constitutionally barred for a third term, Marcos sought to amend the constitution to allow him to do so. A constitutional convention was elected in 1970 for this purpose. Growing unrest led to Marcos declaring martial law in 1972. Months later, the constitutional convention passed a new constitution, which was subsequently ratified in a plebiscite in 1973. Marcos then ruled by decree, and a presidential election would not be held again until 1981. The office of the vice president was abolished in the new constitution but was reinstated in 1984, and an election for it was first held in 1986.

== Background ==
The formal beginning of the 1969 campaign can be dated to the July 1969 meeting of the Philippines' Nacionalista Party, in which Ferdinand Marcos was formally nominated as the party's presidential candidate. A meeting of the party's ruling junta had met a week earlier to assure that the nomination would be unanimous. Ferdinand Marcos won his first campaign for the Philippine Presidency in November 1965, and was inaugurated just before New Year's Day in December the same year. Under the 1935 Philippine Constitution which was in force at the time, Marcos was supposed to be allowed a maximum of two four-year terms as president.

With his popularity already beefed up by debt-funded spending, Marcos's popularity made it very likely that he would win the election, but he decided, as National Artist for Literature Nick Joaquin reported in the Philippines Free Press, "leave nothing to chance." Time and Newsweek would eventually call the 1969 election the "dirtiest, most violent and most corrupt" in Philippine modern history, with the term "Three Gs", meaning "guns, goons, and gold" coined to describe administration's election tactics of vote-buying, terrorism and ballot snatching

Marcos used the military and the government bureaucracy for his campaign, and also went on a campaign spending spree, initiating US$50 million worth in infrastructure projects meant to impress the electorate.

The most infamous incidents of violence took place in Batanes, where Philippine Constabulary officers, paramilitary groups and hired guns essentially took over the island, and motorcycle-riding thugs rode around terrorizing voters and Comelec officials, and beating up opposition leaders.

On April 5, 1969, at the St. Francis Hotel, San Francisco, Marcos exposed Osmeña of collaborating with the Japanese in World War II.

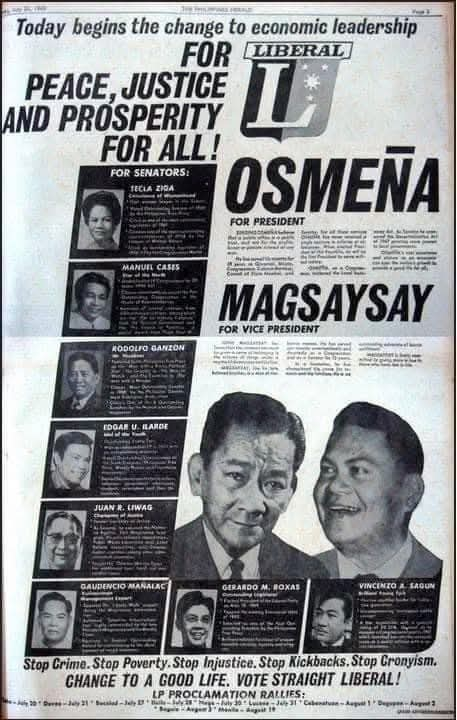

Later on June 15, Osmeña won the Liberal Party nomination for President of the Philippines, and would run against incumbent President Ferdinand Marcos for the 1969 Philippine presidential election. Marcos spent US$50 million in infrastructure projects in an effort to improve the country. This rapid campaign spending was so massive that it would be responsible for the Balance of Payments Crisis of 1970, whose inflationary effect would cause social unrest leading all the way up to the proclamation of Martial Law in 1972. Marcos was reported to have spent Php 100 for every Php 1 that Osmena spent, using up to Php 24 million in Cebu alone.

== Results ==
=== For president ===
Candidate	Party	Votes	%
Ferdinand Marcos (incumbent)	Nacionalista Party	5,017,343	62.24
Sergio Osmeña Jr.	Liberal Party	3,043,122	37.75
Pascual Racuyal	Independent	778	0.01
Segundo Baldovi	Partido ng Bansa	177	0.00
Pantaleon H. Panelo	Independent	123	0.00
German F. Villanueva	Independent	82	0.00
Gaudencio Bueno	New Leaf Party	44	0.00
Angel Comagon	Independent	35	0.00
Cesar Bulacan	Independent	31	0.00
Espiridion D. Buencamino	NP	23	0.00
Nic V. Garces	Philippine Pro-Socialist Party	23	0.00
Benito Jose	Independent	23	0.00
Total		8,061,804	100.00
Valid votes		8,061,804	98.28
Invalid/blank votes		140,989	1.72
Total votes		8,202,793	100.00
Registered voters/turnout		10,300,898	79.63
Source: Nohlen, Grotz, Hartmann, Hasall and Santos

Popular vote
Marcos	61.47%
Osmeña	38.51%
Others	0.02%

==== Results by province and city ====
Province/City	Marcos		Osmeña		Racuyal		Baldovi		Panelo		Villanueva		Bueno		Comagon		Bulacan		Buencamino		Garces		Jose	
Province/City	Votes	%	Votes	%	Votes	%	Votes	%	Votes	%	Votes	%	Votes	%	Votes	%	Votes	%	Votes	%	Votes	%	Votes	%
Abra	41,606	95.58	1,925	4.42	0	0.00	0	0.00	0	0.00	0	0.00	0	0.00	0	0.00	0	0.00	0	0.00	0	0.00	0	0.00
Agusan del Norte	24,015	58.95	16,722	41.05	0	0.00	0	0.00	0	0.00	0	0.00	0	0.00	0	0.00	0	0.00	0	0.00	0	0.00	0	0.00
Agusan del Sur	31,938	65.91	16,520	34.09	0	0.00	0	0.00	0	0.00	0	0.00	0	0.00	0	0.00	0	0.00	0	0.00	0	0.00	0	0.00
Aklan	38,492	57.36	28,609	42.63	3	0.00	0	0.00	0	0.00	0	0.00	0	0.00	0	0.00	0	0.00	0	0.00	0	0.00	0	0.00
Albay	84,071	64.56	46,145	35.43	3	0.00	2	0.00	0	0.00	0	0.00	2	0.00	0	0.00	0	0.00	0	0.00	1	0.00	1	0.00
Angeles City	7,212	39.83	10,889	60.14	5	0.03	0	0.00	0	0.00	0	0.00	0	0.00	0	0.00	0	0.00	0	0.00	0	0.00	0	0.00
Antique	30,042	48.52	31,865	51.46	4	0.01	1	0.00	0	0.00	2	0.00	0	0.00	0	0.00	0	0.00	1	0.00	0	0.00	1	0.00
Bacolod	25,998	52.18	23,797	47.76	5	0.01	24	0.05	0	0.00	0	0.00	0	0.00	0	0.00	0	0.00	0	0.00	4	0.01	0	0.00
Bago	8,483	47.73	9,290	52.27	0	0.00	0	0.00	0	0.00	0	0.00	0	0.00	0	0.00	1	0.01	0	0.00	0	0.00	0	0.00
Baguio	14,930	76.05	4,690	23.89	11	0.06	0	0.00	2	0.01	0	0.00	0	0.00	0	0.00	0	0.00	0	0.00	0	0.00	0	0.00
Bais	3,271	48.89	3,420	51.11	0	0.00	0	0.00	0	0.00	0	0.00	0	0.00	0	0.00	0	0.00	0	0.00	0	0.00	0	0.00
Basilan	7,536	49.45	7,704	50.55	0	0.00	0	0.00	0	0.00	1	0.01	0	0.00	0	0.00	0	0.00	0	0.00	0	0.00	0	0.00
Bataan	41,163	68.74	18,713	31.25	4	0.01	0	0.00	0	0.00	0	0.00	1	0.00	0	0.00	0	0.00	0	0.00	0	0.00	0	0.00
Batanes	3,526	77.41	1,029	22.59	0	0.00	0	0.00	0	0.00	0	0.00	0	0.00	0	0.00	0	0.00	0	0.00	0	0.00	0	0.00
Batangas	129,335	68.78	58,676	31.20	30	0.02	0	0.00	0	0.00	1	0.00	0	0.00	0	0.00	1	0.00	0	0.00	0	0.00	2	0.00
Batangas City	17,151	67.77	8,154	32.22	4	0.02	0	0.00	0	0.00	0	0.00	0	0.00	0	0.00	0	0.00	0	0.00	0	0.00	0	0.00
Benguet	19,752	62.55	11,698	37.05	9	0.03	110	0.35	4	0.01	1	0.00	1	0.00	0	0.00	0	0.00	0	0.00	1	0.00	0	0.00
Bohol	106,944	66.71	53,353	33.28	4	0.00	1	0.00	0	0.00	0	0.00	1	0.00	0	0.00	2	0.00	0	0.00	1	0.00	0	0.00
Bukidnon	28,431	54.09	24,130	45.91	1	0.00	0	0.00	0	0.00	1	0.00	1	0.00	0	0.00	0	0.00	1	0.00	0	0.00	0	0.00
Bulacan	136,701	58.86	95,369	41.06	99	0.04	1	0.00	85	0.04	1	0.00	0	0.00	4	0.00	5	0.00	0	0.00	0	0.00	2	0.00
Butuan	23,773	55.93	18,729	44.06	2	0.00	0	0.00	0	0.00	1	0.00	0	0.00	0	0.00	0	0.00	0	0.00	0	0.00	0	0.00
Cabanatuan	13,558	62.52	8,129	37.48	0	0.00	0	0.00	0	0.00	0	0.00	0	0.00	0	0.00	0	0.00	0	0.00	0	0.00	0	0.00
Cadiz	12,687	90.20	1,378	9.80	0	0.00	0	0.00	0	0.00	0	0.00	0	0.00	1	0.01	0	0.00	0	0.00	0	0.00	0	0.00
Cagayan	110,533	92.29	9,220	7.70	8	0.01	0	0.00	0	0.00	0	0.00	0	0.00	0	0.00	0	0.00	1	0.00	0	0.00	1	0.00
Cagayan de Oro	14,711	54.19	12,438	45.81	0	0.00	0	0.00	0	0.00	0	0.00	0	0.00	0	0.00	0	0.00	0	0.00	0	0.00	0	0.00
Calbayog	11,012	61.37	6,933	38.63	0	0.00	0	0.00	0	0.00	0	0.00	0	0.00	0	0.00	0	0.00	0	0.00	0	0.00	0	0.00
Caloocan	26,417	57.72	19,338	42.25	11	0.02	0	0.00	0	0.00	0	0.00	1	0.00	0	0.00	0	0.00	0	0.00	0	0.00	0	0.00
Camarines Norte	30,708	52.70	27,556	47.29	1	0.00	0	0.00	0	0.00	0	0.00	0	0.00	1	0.00	0	0.00	0	0.00	0	0.00	0	0.00
Camarines Sur	92,137	58.00	66,714	42.00	1	0.00	0	0.00	6	0.00	0	0.00	0	0.00	0	0.00	1	0.00	0	0.00	1	0.00	0	0.00
Camiguin	9,916	62.12	6,033	37.79	1	0.01	1	0.01	0	0.00	1	0.01	1	0.01	2	0.01	3	0.02	0	0.00	3	0.02	2	0.01
Canlaon	1,948	59.48	1,327	40.52	0	0.00	0	0.00	0	0.00	0	0.00	0	0.00	0	0.00	0	0.00	0	0.00	0	0.00	0	0.00
Capiz	44,152	62.37	26,642	37.63	0	0.00	0	0.00	0	0.00	0	0.00	0	0.00	0	0.00	0	0.00	0	0.00	0	0.00	0	0.00
Catanduanes	38,681	88.92	4,820	11.08	0	0.00	0	0.00	0	0.00	0	0.00	0	0.00	0	0.00	0	0.00	0	0.00	0	0.00	0	0.00
Cavite	65,686	56.94	49,663	43.05	1	0.00	0	0.00	0	0.00	0	0.00	0	0.00	0	0.00	0	0.00	0	0.00	0	0.00	0	0.00
Cavite City	8,492	55.75	6,735	44.22	4	0.03	0	0.00	0	0.00	0	0.00	0	0.00	0	0.00	0	0.00	0	0.00	0	0.00	0	0.00
Cebu	156,091	57.10	117,283	42.90	0	0.00	0	0.00	0	0.00	0	0.00	0	0.00	0	0.00	0	0.00	0	0.00	0	0.00	0	0.00
Cebu City	33,392	40.53	48,984	59.46	5	0.01	0	0.00	0	0.00	0	0.00	0	0.00	0	0.00	0	0.00	0	0.00	0	0.00	0	0.00
Cotabato	100,336	60.36	65,900	39.64	2	0.00	0	0.00	0	0.00	0	0.00	0	0.00	0	0.00	0	0.00	0	0.00	0	0.00	0	0.00
Cotabato City	7,801	72.79	2,914	27.19	1	0.01	0	0.00	0	0.00	1	0.01	0	0.00	0	0.00	0	0.00	0	0.00	0	0.00	0	0.00
Dagupan	12,836	57.08	9,649	42.91	4	0.02	0	0.00	0	0.00	0	0.00	0	0.00	0	0.00	0	0.00	0	0.00	0	0.00	0	0.00
Danao	15,416	94.61	877	5.38	2	0.01	0	0.00	0	0.00	0	0.00	0	0.00	0	0.00	0	0.00	0	0.00	0	0.00	0	0.00
Dapitan	7,234	73.94	2,550	26.06	0	0.00	0	0.00	0	0.00	0	0.00	0	0.00	0	0.00	0	0.00	0	0.00	0	0.00	0	0.00
Davao City	44,999	63.73	25,594	36.25	13	0.02	0	0.00	0	0.00	0	0.00	0	0.00	0	0.00	0	0.00	0	0.00	0	0.00	0	0.00
Davao del Norte	52,088	67.20	25,419	32.79	3	0.00	0	0.00	0	0.00	1	0.00	0	0.00	0	0.00	1	0.00	0	0.00	0	0.00	0	0.00
Davao del Sur	35,054	62.19	21,311	37.81	0	0.00	0	0.00	0	0.00	0	0.00	0	0.00	0	0.00	0	0.00	0	0.00	0	0.00	0	0.00
Davao Oriental	29,749	69.85	12,838	30.15	0	0.00	0	0.00	0	0.00	0	0.00	0	0.00	0	0.00	0	0.00	0	0.00	0	0.00	0	0.00
Dumaguete	7,224	51.59	6,769	48.34	9	0.06	0	0.00	0	0.00	0	0.00	0	0.00	0	0.00	0	0.00	0	0.00	0	0.00	0	0.00
Eastern Samar	36,457	65.47	19,231	34.53	0	0.00	0	0.00	0	0.00	0	0.00	0	0.00	0	0.00	0	0.00	0	0.00	0	0.00	0	0.00
General Santos	7,758	50.94	7,472	49.06	0	0.00	0	0.00	0	0.00	0	0.00	0	0.00	0	0.00	0	0.00	0	0.00	0	0.00	0	0.00
Gingoog	6,769	52.31	6,172	47.69	0	0.00	0	0.00	0	0.00	0	0.00	0	0.00	0	0.00	0	0.00	0	0.00	0	0.00	0	0.00
Ifugao	6,927	55.63	5,521	44.34	1	0.01	0	0.00	0	0.00	0	0.00	0	0.00	1	0.01	1	0.01	0	0.00	0	0.00	0	0.00
Iligan	9,486	40.68	13,827	59.30	3	0.01	0	0.00	0	0.00	0	0.00	1	0.00	0	0.00	0	0.00	0	0.00	0	0.00	0	0.00
Ilocos Norte	80,631	98.52	1,215	1.48	0	0.00	0	0.00	0	0.00	0	0.00	0	0.00	0	0.00	0	0.00	0	0.00	0	0.00	0	0.00
Ilocos Sur	95,379	91.50	8,860	8.50	0	0.00	0	0.00	0	0.00	0	0.00	0	0.00	0	0.00	0	0.00	0	0.00	0	0.00	0	0.00
Iloilo	123,461	50.84	119,393	49.16	5	0.00	1	0.00	0	0.00	0	0.00	2	0.00	0	0.00	0	0.00	0	0.00	0	0.00	2	0.00
Iloilo City	29,096	51.85	27,015	48.14	8	0.01	0	0.00	0	0.00	0	0.00	0	0.00	0	0.00	0	0.00	1	0.00	0	0.00	0	0.00
Iriga	7,021	54.62	5,834	45.38	0	0.00	0	0.00	0	0.00	0	0.00	0	0.00	0	0.00	0	0.00	0	0.00	0	0.00	0	0.00
Isabela	91,299	78.55	24,932	21.45	1	0.00	0	0.00	0	0.00	0	0.00	1	0.00	1	0.00	0	0.00	0	0.00	0	0.00	0	0.00
Kalinga-Apayao	21,257	78.95	5,663	21.03	2	0.01	0	0.00	0	0.00	0	0.00	0	0.00	0	0.00	0	0.00	0	0.00	1	0.00	1	0.00
La Carlota	7,515	65.36	3,983	34.64	0	0.00	0	0.00	0	0.00	0	0.00	0	0.00	0	0.00	0	0.00	0	0.00	0	0.00	0	0.00
La Union	89,165	90.68	9,157	9.31	2	0.00	0	0.00	0	0.00	0	0.00	0	0.00	0	0.00	0	0.00	0	0.00	0	0.00	0	0.00
Laguna	102,766	64.02	57,730	35.97	6	0.00	1	0.00	0	0.00	2	0.00	8	0.00	0	0.00	0	0.00	0	0.00	1	0.00	0	0.00
Lanao del Norte	53,053	83.66	10,364	16.34	0	0.00	0	0.00	0	0.00	0	0.00	0	0.00	0	0.00	0	0.00	0	0.00	0	0.00	0	0.00
Lanao del Sur	45,696	56.49	35,199	43.51	0	0.00	0	0.00	0	0.00	0	0.00	0	0.00	0	0.00	0	0.00	0	0.00	0	0.00	0	0.00
Laoag	18,110	97.21	520	2.79	0	0.00	0	0.00	0	0.00	0	0.00	0	0.00	0	0.00	0	0.00	0	0.00	0	0.00	0	0.00
Lapu-Lapu City	7,123	42.84	9,501	57.15	1	0.01	0	0.00	0	0.00	1	0.01	0	0.00	0	0.00	0	0.00	0	0.00	0	0.00	0	0.00
Legazpi	16,874	70.43	7,082	29.56	1	0.00	0	0.00	0	0.00	0	0.00	0	0.00	0	0.00	0	0.00	0	0.00	0	0.00	0	0.00
Leyte	134,680	65.15	72,055	34.85	1	0.00	0	0.00	0	0.00	1	0.00	0	0.00	0	0.00	0	0.00	0	0.00	0	0.00	0	0.00
Lipa	9,985	44.22	12,592	55.76	4	0.02	0	0.00	0	0.00	0	0.00	0	0.00	0	0.00	0	0.00	0	0.00	0	0.00	0	0.00
Lucena	10,043	55.57	8,028	44.42	2	0.01	0	0.00	0	0.00	0	0.00	0	0.00	0	0.00	0	0.00	0	0.00	0	0.00	0	0.00
Mandaue	5,751	45.80	6,804	54.18	2	0.02	0	0.00	0	0.00	0	0.00	0	0.00	0	0.00	0	0.00	0	0.00	0	0.00	0	0.00
Manila	182,956	54.34	153,541	45.60	158	0.05	2	0.00	7	0.00	4	0.00	3	0.00	8	0.00	4	0.00	2	0.00	1	0.00	2	0.00
Marawi	7,408	57.67	5,438	42.33	0	0.00	0	0.00	0	0.00	0	0.00	0	0.00	0	0.00	0	0.00	0	0.00	0	0.00	0	0.00
Marinduque	22,934	63.28	13,303	36.71	3	0.01	0	0.00	0	0.00	0	0.00	0	0.00	0	0.00	0	0.00	0	0.00	0	0.00	0	0.00
Masbate	45,662	53.31	39,994	46.69	0	0.00	0	0.00	0	0.00	0	0.00	0	0.00	0	0.00	0	0.00	0	0.00	0	0.00	0	0.00
Misamis Occidental	41,323	68.04	19,407	31.95	1	0.00	0	0.00	0	0.00	1	0.00	0	0.00	0	0.00	0	0.00	2	0.00	0	0.00	0	0.00
Misamis Oriental	33,242	56.57	25,518	43.42	2	0.00	0	0.00	1	0.00	1	0.00	1	0.00	0	0.00	0	0.00	0	0.00	0	0.00	1	0.00
Mountain Province	9,981	68.82	4,518	31.15	3	0.02	0	0.00	0	0.00	0	0.00	1	0.01	0	0.00	0	0.00	1	0.01	0	0.00	0	0.00
Naga	8,372	54.83	6,889	45.12	1	0.01	0	0.00	6	0.04	0	0.00	1	0.01	0	0.00	0	0.00	0	0.00	0	0.00	0	0.00
Negros Occidental	114,154	57.56	84,178	42.44	0	0.00	1	0.00	0	0.00	0	0.00	0	0.00	0	0.00	0	0.00	0	0.00	0	0.00	0	0.00
Negros Oriental	62,944	56.90	47,667	43.09	0	0.00	1	0.00	1	0.00	1	0.00	0	0.00	0	0.00	0	0.00	1	0.00	1	0.00	0	0.00
Northern Samar	29,544	51.04	28,337	48.96	0	0.00	0	0.00	0	0.00	0	0.00	0	0.00	0	0.00	0	0.00	0	0.00	0	0.00	0	0.00
Nueva Ecija	113,667	67.47	54,776	32.51	6	0.00	5	0.00	0	0.00	9	0.01	1	0.00	0	0.00	1	0.00	0	0.00	1	0.00	1	0.00
Nueva Vizcaya	34,763	76.26	10,818	23.73	1	0.00	0	0.00	0	0.00	0	0.00	2	0.00	0	0.00	1	0.00	0	0.00	0	0.00	0	0.00
Occidental Mindoro	23,085	65.70	12,053	34.30	0	0.00	0	0.00	0	0.00	0	0.00	0	0.00	0	0.00	0	0.00	0	0.00	0	0.00	0	0.00
Olongapo	10,550	54.70	8,734	45.28	3	0.02	0	0.00	0	0.00	1	0.01	0	0.00	0	0.00	0	0.00	0	0.00	0	0.00	0	0.00
Oriental Mindoro	44,060	61.24	27,879	38.75	3	0.00	0	0.00	0	0.00	0	0.00	0	0.00	0	0.00	0	0.00	0	0.00	0	0.00	0	0.00
Ormoc	11,250	70.12	4,794	29.88	0	0.00	0	0.00	0	0.00	0	0.00	0	0.00	0	0.00	0	0.00	0	0.00	0	0.00	0	0.00
Ozamiz	11,032	55.90	8,700	44.09	2	0.01	0	0.00	0	0.00	0	0.00	0	0.00	0	0.00	0	0.00	0	0.00	0	0.00	0	0.00
Pagadian	6,399	58.31	4,576	41.69	0	0.00	0	0.00	0	0.00	0	0.00	0	0.00	0	0.00	0	0.00	0	0.00	0	0.00	0	0.00
Palawan	23,602	53.27	20,705	46.73	1	0.00	0	0.00	0	0.00	0	0.00	0	0.00	0	0.00	0	0.00	0	0.00	0	0.00	0	0.00
Palayan	1,686	77.37	493	22.63	0	0.00	0	0.00	0	0.00	0	0.00	0	0.00	0	0.00	0	0.00	0	0.00	0	0.00	0	0.00
Pampanga	34,801	28.97	85,292	71.01	2	0.00	15	0.01	0	0.00	0	0.00	1	0.00	0	0.00	0	0.00	0	0.00	0	0.00	0	0.00
Pangasinan	207,458	64.59	113,724	35.41	17	0.01	0	0.00	0	0.00	4	0.00	0	0.00	2	0.00	0	0.00	1	0.00	2	0.00	0	0.00
Pasay	24,714	55.45	19,838	44.51	13	0.03	1	0.00	0	0.00	0	0.00	0	0.00	4	0.01	0	0.00	1	0.00	1	0.00	0	0.00
Quezon	114,768	56.51	88,306	43.48	7	0.00	2	0.00	1	0.00	0	0.00	0	0.00	0	0.00	1	0.00	0	0.00	1	0.00	0	0.00
Quezon City	67,216	58.83	46,905	41.05	119	0.10	0	0.00	5	0.00	0	0.00	6	0.01	4	0.00	0	0.00	4	0.00	1	0.00	1	0.00
Rizal	192,410	57.39	142,726	42.57	110	0.03	4	0.00	2	0.00	1	0.00	0	0.00	2	0.00	8	0.00	3	0.00	0	0.00	2	0.00
Romblon	20,197	50.45	19,832	49.54	1	0.00	0	0.00	0	0.00	0	0.00	0	0.00	0	0.00	0	0.00	0	0.00	0	0.00	0	0.00
Roxas	8,316	46.98	9,387	53.02	0	0.00	0	0.00	0	0.00	0	0.00	0	0.00	0	0.00	0	0.00	0	0.00	0	0.00	0	0.00
Samar	38,979	58.89	27,210	41.11	0	0.00	0	0.00	0	0.00	0	0.00	0	0.00	0	0.00	0	0.00	0	0.00	0	0.00	0	0.00
San Carlos, Negros Occidental	7,831	47.48	8,661	52.52	0	0.00	0	0.00	0	0.00	0	0.00	0	0.00	0	0.00	0	0.00	0	0.00	0	0.00	0	0.00
San Carlos, Pangasinan	10,776	53.96	9,192	46.03	1	0.01	0	0.00	0	0.00	0	0.00	0	0.00	0	0.00	0	0.00	0	0.00	0	0.00	0	0.00
San Jose	8,903	79.78	2,253	20.19	3	0.03	0	0.00	0	0.00	0	0.00	1	0.01	0	0.00	0	0.00	0	0.00	0	0.00	0	0.00
San Pablo	16,142	56.54	12,402	43.44	7	0.02	0	0.00	0	0.00	1	0.00	0	0.00	0	0.00	0	0.00	0	0.00	0	0.00	0	0.00
Silay	14,144	68.23	6,583	31.76	2	0.01	0	0.00	0	0.00	0	0.00	0	0.00	0	0.00	0	0.00	0	0.00	0	0.00	0	0.00
Sorsogon	67,275	65.83	34,917	34.17	4	0.00	0	0.00	0	0.00	0	0.00	0	0.00	0	0.00	0	0.00	0	0.00	0	0.00	0	0.00
South Cotabato	36,110	58.38	25,738	41.61	0	0.00	0	0.00	0	0.00	0	0.00	0	0.00	1	0.00	0	0.00	0	0.00	0	0.00	0	0.00
Southern Leyte	37,629	62.71	22,379	37.29	0	0.00	1	0.00	0	0.00	0	0.00	0	0.00	0	0.00	0	0.00	0	0.00	0	0.00	0	0.00
Sulu	78,722	66.53	39,608	33.47	0	0.00	0	0.00	0	0.00	0	0.00	0	0.00	0	0.00	0	0.00	1	0.00	0	0.00	1	0.00
Surigao del Norte	56,683	86.48	8,857	13.51	0	0.00	0	0.00	0	0.00	0	0.00	0	0.00	1	0.00	0	0.00	0	0.00	0	0.00	0	0.00
Surigao del Sur	33,912	56.96	25,625	43.04	1	0.00	0	0.00	0	0.00	0	0.00	0	0.00	0	0.00	0	0.00	0	0.00	0	0.00	0	0.00
Tacloban	11,696	67.12	5,730	32.88	0	0.00	0	0.00	0	0.00	0	0.00	0	0.00	0	0.00	0	0.00	0	0.00	0	0.00	0	0.00
Tagaytay	1,165	37.56	1,937	62.44	0	0.00	0	0.00	0	0.00	0	0.00	0	0.00	0	0.00	0	0.00	0	0.00	0	0.00	0	0.00
Tagbilaran	5,839	60.65	3,783	39.30	4	0.04	0	0.00	0	0.00	0	0.00	0	0.00	0	0.00	0	0.00	0	0.00	0	0.00	1	0.01
Tangub	3,001	49.81	3,024	50.19	0	0.00	0	0.00	0	0.00	0	0.00	0	0.00	0	0.00	0	0.00	0	0.00	0	0.00	0	0.00
Tarlac	76,078	63.62	43,487	36.37	5	0.00	0	0.00	2	0.00	0	0.00	1	0.00	2	0.00	0	0.00	3	0.00	0	0.00	1	0.00
Toledo	9,874	54.72	8,171	45.28	1	0.01	0	0.00	0	0.00	0	0.00	0	0.00	0	0.00	0	0.00	0	0.00	0	0.00	0	0.00
Trece Martires	304	18.51	1,338	81.49	0	0.00	0	0.00	0	0.00	0	0.00	0	0.00	0	0.00	0	0.00	0	0.00	0	0.00	0	0.00
Zambales	41,622	69.24	18,440	30.68	0	0.00	0	0.00	0	0.00	42	0.07	5	0.01	0	0.00	1	0.00	0	0.00	1	0.00	0	0.00
Zamboanga City	17,481	60.83	11,250	39.15	3	0.01	0	0.00	0	0.00	1	0.00	1	0.00	1	0.00	0	0.00	0	0.00	0	0.00	0	0.00
Zamboanga del Norte	53,909	71.47	21,511	28.52	5	0.01	1	0.00	1	0.00	0	0.00	0	0.00	0	0.00	0	0.00	0	0.00	1	0.00	1	0.00
Zamboanga del Sur	57,244	61.32	36,107	38.68	0	0.00	2	0.00	0	0.00	1	0.00	0	0.00	0	0.00	0	0.00	0	0.00	0	0.00	0	0.00
Total	5,017,343	62.24	3,043,122	37.75	778	0.01	177	0.00	123	0.00	82	0.00	44	0.00	35	0.00	31	0.00	23	0.00	23	0.00	23	0.00
Source: Senate

=== For vice-president ===
Candidate	Party	Votes	%
Fernando Lopez	Nacionalista Party	5,001,737	62.75
Genaro Magsaysay	Liberal Party	2,968,526	37.24
Victoriano Mallari	Partido ng Bansa	229	0.00
Modesto T. Jalandoni	Philippine Pro-Socialist Party	161	0.00
Total		7,970,653	100.00
Valid votes		7,970,653	97.17
Invalid/blank votes		232,140	2.83
Total votes		8,202,793	100.00
Registered voters/turnout		10,300,898	79.63
Source: Nohlen, Grotz, Hartmann, Hasall and Santos

Popular vote
Lopez	62.75%
Magsaysay	37.24%

==== Results by province and city ====
Province/City	Lopez		Magsaysay		Mallari		Jalandoni	
Province/City	Votes	%	Votes	%	Votes	%	Votes	%
Abra	35,686	82.08	7,792	17.92	0	0.00	0	0.00
Agusan del Norte	22,033	54.87	18,124	45.13	0	0.00	0	0.00
Agusan del Sur	31,695	68.05	14,883	31.95	0	0.00	0	0.00
Aklan	41,895	62.82	24,789	37.17	2	0.00	5	0.01
Albay	78,640	61.26	49,727	38.73	12	0.01	1	0.00
Angeles City	7,266	40.47	10,686	59.52	1	0.01	0	0.00
Antique	44,170	72.43	16,806	27.56	2	0.00	1	0.00
Bacolod	34,849	70.30	14,723	29.70	0	0.00	2	0.00
Bago	9,700	55.07	7,912	44.92	0	0.00	1	0.01
Baguio	14,040	71.55	5,578	28.43	3	0.02	2	0.01
Bais	3,517	53.30	3,082	46.70	0	0.00	0	0.00
Basilan	8,101	54.90	6,654	45.09	1	0.01	1	0.01
Bataan	37,395	63.11	21,862	36.89	0	0.00	0	0.00
Batanes	3,384	79.10	894	20.90	0	0.00	0	0.00
Batangas	130,475	70.77	53,871	29.22	13	0.01	2	0.00
Batangas City	16,810	67.28	8,175	32.72	1	0.00	0	0.00
Benguet	18,121	58.05	13,095	41.95	1	0.00	0	0.00
Bohol	108,083	68.12	50,576	31.88	3	0.00	1	0.00
Bukidnon	28,574	55.00	23,377	45.00	0	0.00	3	0.01
Bulacan	141,156	61.26	89,255	38.74	2	0.00	3	0.00
Butuan	22,920	55.05	18,717	44.95	0	0.00	1	0.00
Cabanatuan	11,681	54.20	9,869	45.80	0	0.00	0	0.00
Cadiz	13,082	93.19	956	6.81	0	0.00	0	0.00
Cagayan	100,493	83.01	20,505	16.94	56	0.05	1	0.00
Cagayan de Oro	15,755	58.44	11,205	41.56	0	0.00	0	0.00
Calbayog	11,075	62.85	6,545	37.15	0	0.00	0	0.00
Caloocan	25,651	56.30	19,913	43.70	0	0.00	0	0.00
Camarines Norte	29,045	50.22	28,790	49.78	0	0.00	0	0.00
Camarines Sur	92,270	58.90	64,396	41.10	0	0.00	0	0.00
Camiguin	9,650	62.70	5,726	37.21	8	0.05	6	0.04
Canlaon	1,900	59.01	1,320	40.99	0	0.00	0	0.00
Capiz	49,173	70.58	20,501	29.42	0	0.00	0	0.00
Catanduanes	38,102	88.22	5,089	11.78	1	0.00	0	0.00
Cavite	71,405	63.21	41,560	36.79	0	0.00	0	0.00
Cavite City	10,070	66.60	5,049	33.40	0	0.00	0	0.00
Cebu	161,459	60.42	105,754	39.58	0	0.00	0	0.00
Cebu City	38,383	46.85	43,550	53.15	1	0.00	0	0.00
Cotabato	113,276	69.63	49,373	30.35	5	0.00	27	0.02
Cotabato City	8,382	79.40	2,175	20.60	0	0.00	0	0.00
Dagupan	11,322	50.64	11,035	49.36	0	0.00	0	0.00
Danao	15,400	94.98	814	5.02	0	0.00	0	0.00
Dapitan	7,584	79.46	1,961	20.54	0	0.00	0	0.00
Davao City	49,073	69.90	21,133	30.10	0	0.00	0	0.00
Davao del Norte	52,425	68.22	24,417	31.77	1	0.00	1	0.00
Davao del Sur	35,628	63.72	20,289	36.28	0	0.00	0	0.00
Davao Oriental	28,614	67.82	13,571	32.17	1	0.00	2	0.00
Dumaguete	8,217	59.14	5,678	40.86	0	0.00	0	0.00
Eastern Samar	34,044	63.36	19,685	36.64	0	0.00	2	0.00
General Santos	7,501	49.54	7,638	50.45	0	0.00	2	0.01
Gingoog	6,011	47.21	6,722	52.79	0	0.00	0	0.00
Ifugao	6,503	53.16	5,726	46.81	2	0.02	2	0.02
Iligan	11,064	48.02	11,975	51.97	1	0.00	0	0.00
Ilocos Norte	75,199	92.49	6,106	7.51	0	0.00	0	0.00
Ilocos Sur	81,543	79.69	20,781	20.31	2	0.00	0	0.00
Iloilo	178,651	74.44	61,320	25.55	2	0.00	5	0.00
Iloilo City	37,287	66.71	18,607	33.29	1	0.00	0	0.00
Iriga	7,421	58.54	5,256	41.46	0	0.00	0	0.00
Isabela	69,819	60.59	45,413	39.41	1	0.00	0	0.00
Kalinga-Apayao	17,594	68.23	8,190	31.76	1	0.00	2	0.01
La Carlota	8,732	76.81	2,637	23.19	0	0.00	0	0.00
La Union	77,730	79.61	19,911	20.39	0	0.00	0	0.00
Laguna	104,943	65.94	54,203	34.06	0	0.00	3	0.00
Lanao del Norte	50,543	82.39	10,800	17.61	0	0.00	0	0.00
Lanao del Sur	39,364	56.11	30,797	43.89	0	0.00	0	0.00
Laoag	16,968	91.39	1,599	8.61	0	0.00	0	0.00
Lapu-Lapu City	6,929	42.49	9,377	57.50	1	0.01	1	0.01
Legazpi	16,046	67.57	7,701	32.43	0	0.00	0	0.00
Leyte	130,752	64.12	73,163	35.88	0	0.00	0	0.00
Lipa	10,017	45.79	11,856	54.20	0	0.00	1	0.00
Lucena	11,294	62.83	6,682	37.17	0	0.00	0	0.00
Mandaue	6,005	48.09	6,483	51.91	0	0.00	0	0.00
Manila	199,609	59.41	136,318	40.58	20	0.01	14	0.00
Marawi	6,452	55.29	5,218	44.71	0	0.00	0	0.00
Marinduque	20,484	57.74	14,987	42.25	2	0.01	3	0.01
Masbate	41,699	49.87	41,913	50.13	0	0.00	0	0.00
Misamis Occidental	41,142	68.74	18,710	31.26	1	0.00	2	0.00
Misamis Oriental	31,320	54.58	26,055	45.41	0	0.00	4	0.01
Mountain Province	8,433	60.23	5,567	39.76	0	0.00	1	0.01
Naga	8,603	56.62	6,592	43.38	0	0.00	0	0.00
Negros Occidental	135,306	68.95	60,946	31.05	0	0.00	0	0.00
Negros Oriental	65,190	59.83	43,763	40.17	1	0.00	1	0.00
Northern Samar	27,758	49.01	28,874	50.99	0	0.00	0	0.00
Nueva Ecija	96,258	57.72	70,513	42.28	3	0.00	0	0.00
Nueva Vizcaya	25,824	56.91	19,554	43.09	0	0.00	0	0.00
Occidental Mindoro	21,561	62.01	13,207	37.99	0	0.00	0	0.00
Olongapo	10,800	56.20	8,418	43.80	0	0.00	0	0.00
Oriental Mindoro	40,544	57.01	30,578	42.99	0	0.00	0	0.00
Ormoc	11,182	70.29	4,726	29.71	0	0.00	0	0.00
Ozamiz	11,102	57.29	8,274	42.70	1	0.01	0	0.00
Pagadian	6,386	58.87	4,461	41.13	0	0.00	0	0.00
Palawan	25,136	57.25	18,767	42.75	0	0.00	0	0.00
Palayan	1,197	55.37	965	44.63	0	0.00	0	0.00
Pampanga	35,865	25.79	103,176	74.19	25	0.02	3	0.00
Pangasinan	179,092	56.04	140,494	43.96	5	0.00	7	0.00
Pasay	28,191	63.47	16,222	36.52	3	0.01	0	0.00
Quezon	110,854	55.02	90,636	44.98	1	0.00	0	0.00
Quezon City	75,079	65.77	39,049	34.21	9	0.01	10	0.01
Rizal	207,285	62.12	126,384	37.88	9	0.00	8	0.00
Romblon	21,721	54.50	18,137	45.50	0	0.00	0	0.00
Roxas	9,552	54.60	7,942	45.40	0	0.00	0	0.00
Samar	36,905	57.07	27,763	42.93	0	0.00	0	0.00
San Carlos, Negros Occidental	8,989	55.29	7,269	44.71	0	0.00	0	0.00
San Carlos, Pangasinan	9,573	47.91	10,410	52.09	0	0.00	0	0.00
San Jose	7,341	66.03	3,776	33.97	0	0.00	0	0.00
San Pablo	16,940	59.92	11,330	40.08	0	0.00	0	0.00
Silay	16,222	78.98	4,317	21.02	0	0.00	0	0.00
Sorsogon	62,659	62.43	37,698	37.56	1	0.00	2	0.00
South Cotabato	39,116	63.94	22,054	36.05	2	0.00	0	0.00
Southern Leyte	37,244	62.54	22,311	37.46	2	0.00	0	0.00
Sulu	74,654	66.64	37,363	33.35	1	0.00	5	0.00
Surigao del Norte	52,904	81.55	11,967	18.45	0	0.00	2	0.00
Surigao del Sur	31,971	54.70	26,478	45.30	0	0.00	0	0.00
Tacloban	10,837	62.63	6,467	37.37	0	0.00	0	0.00
Tagaytay	1,472	49.45	1,505	50.55	0	0.00	0	0.00
Tagbilaran	6,108	63.79	3,467	36.21	0	0.00	0	0.00
Tangub	2,892	48.56	3,063	51.44	0	0.00	0	0.00
Tarlac	61,946	52.38	56,299	47.60	13	0.01	7	0.01
Toledo	10,020	56.35	7,763	43.65	0	0.00	0	0.00
Trece Martires	411	25.95	1,173	74.05	0	0.00	0	0.00
Zambales	21,678	36.22	38,170	63.78	1	0.00	1	0.00
Zamboanga City	18,069	63.94	10,182	36.03	3	0.01	4	0.01
Zamboanga del Norte	56,580	77.28	16,630	22.71	1	0.00	3	0.00
Zamboanga del Sur	53,996	59.83	36,245	40.16	0	0.00	6	0.01
Total	5,001,737	62.75	2,968,526	37.24	229	0.00	161	0.00
Source: Senate

== Aftermath ==
Despite the electoral victory of president Marcos, Osmeña never conceded defeat.

Marcos, who was term-limited in the upcoming 1973 election, proposed drafting a new constitution. An election in 1970 elected delegates to the constitutional convention. Due to rising unrest, Marcos declared martial law and suspended the current (1935) constitution in 1972. The constitutional convention, which by then had seen its delegates opposed to Marcos dictatorship arrested or fled the country, then passed its draft constitution, and a plebiscite in January 1973 approved the constitution. A petition declaring that the 1973 constitution as unlawfully enacted was dismissed by the Supreme Court. Further plebiscites in July 1973 and 1977 extended Marcos's term, and a presidential election wouldn't be held again until 1981.

== See also ==
- Commission on Elections
- Politics of the Philippines
- Philippine elections
- President of the Philippines
- 7th Congress of the Philippines
- Ferdinand Marcos 1969 presidential campaign
