= Genaro Magsaysay =

Filipino politician and brother of Ramon Magsaysay (1924–1978)

The Honorable Genaro Magsaysay
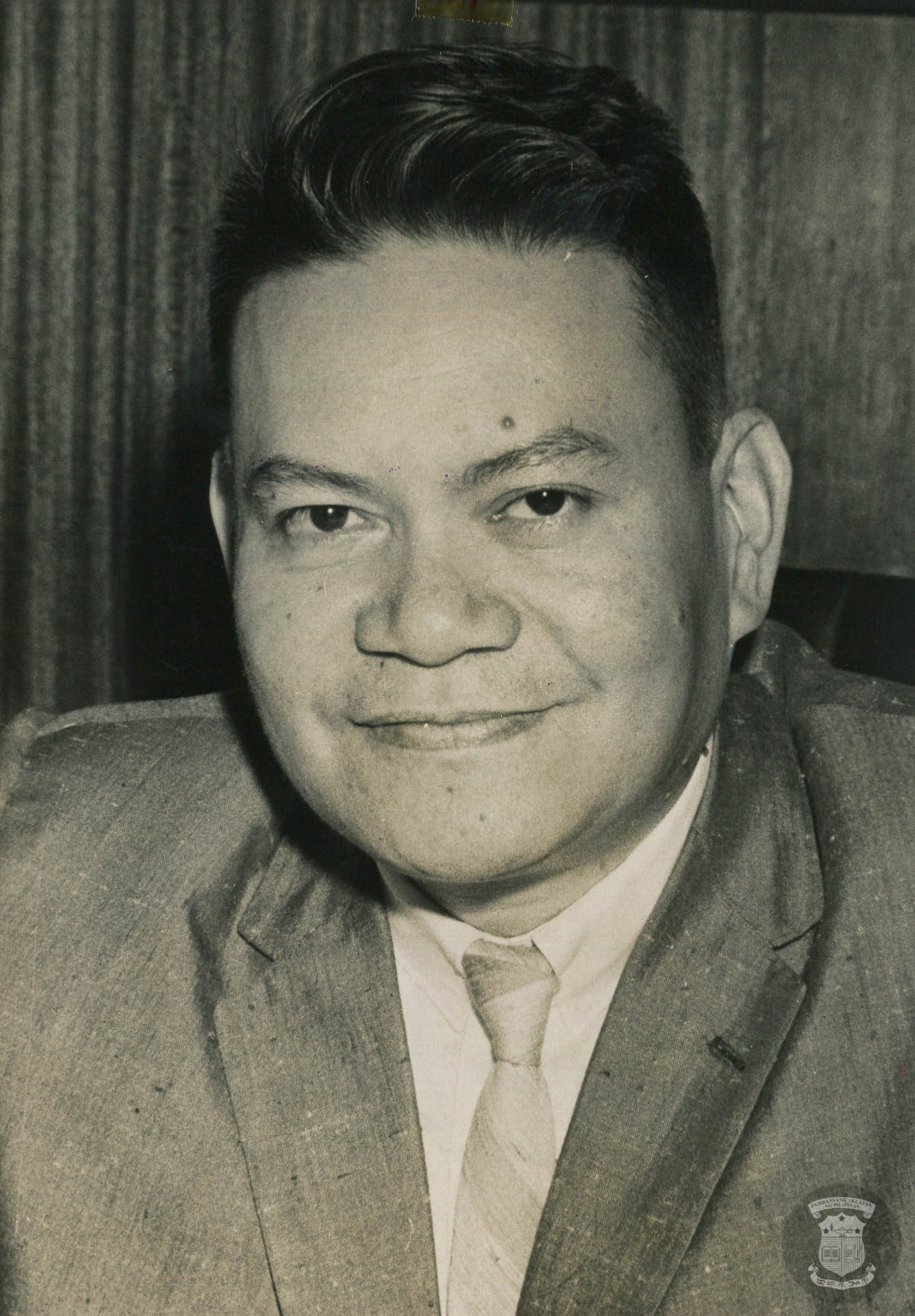

Senator of the Philippines
- In office December 30, 1959 – September 23, 1972

Member of the Philippine House of Representatives from Zambales' at-large district
- In office December 30, 1957 – December 30, 1959
- Preceded by: Enrique Corpus
- Succeeded by: Virgilio L. Afable

Personal details
- Born: Genaro del Fierro Magsaysay; September 19, 1924 Castillejos, Zambales, Philippine Islands
- Died: December 25, 1978 (aged 54) Manila, Philippines
- Party: Liberal (from 1969)
- Other political affiliations: Nacionalista (until 1969)
- Education: Ateneo de Manila University (LL.B)
- Profession: Lawyer, politician

Genaro del Fierro Magsaysay (19 September 1924 – 25 December 1978) was a Filipino lawyer and politician.

== Early life and education ==
He was born in Castillejos, Zambales on 19 September 1924 to Exequiel Magsaysay y de los Santos and Perfecta del Fierro y Quimson. He pursued his undergraduate studies in the University of the Philippines. There, he became a member of the Alpha Phi Beta Fraternity. Magsaysay earned a bachelor's degree in law from the Ateneo de Manila University.

== Political career ==
He ran in his first national level election in 1957 under the Nacionalista Party banner, shortly after the death of his elder brother, President Ramon Magsaysay. Genaro Magsaysay served in the House of Representatives, representing Zambales Lone District until 1959, when he contested his first Senate election. He won reelection to the Senate in 1965 and served a second six-year term.

In 1969, Sergio Osmeña Jr. and Genaro Magsaysay formed the Liberal Party presidential ticket, losing to incumbent Ferdinand Marcos. Afterwards, Magsaysay represented the Liberal Party in the Senate from 1971 to 1972. During his 1971 senatorial campaign, Magsaysay was injured by two grenade explosions while attending a political rally in Manila, as were fellow politicians Ramon Bagatsing, Eva Estrada Kalaw, Eddie Ilarde, Ramon Mitra Jr., and John Henry Osmeña. Over the course of his legislative career, Magsaysay was active in infrastructure and social service initiatives. Described by writer Yen Makabenta as "no talk, no mistake," Magsaysay did not often engage in oration or parliamentary debate.

== Personal life ==
Magsaysay died on 25 December 1978, and was interred in Manila North Cemetery. He was married to Adelaida Rodriguez, the daughter of Eulogio Rodriguez. Their second child, Eulogio Magsaysay, has also served as a member of the House of Representatives. An affair with actress Lyn Madrigal produced daughters - Genevieve Magsaysay and Genelyn Magsaysay, who was the mother of actor Ramgen Revilla.
