= Sergio Osmeña Jr. =

Filipino politician from Cebu (1916–1984)

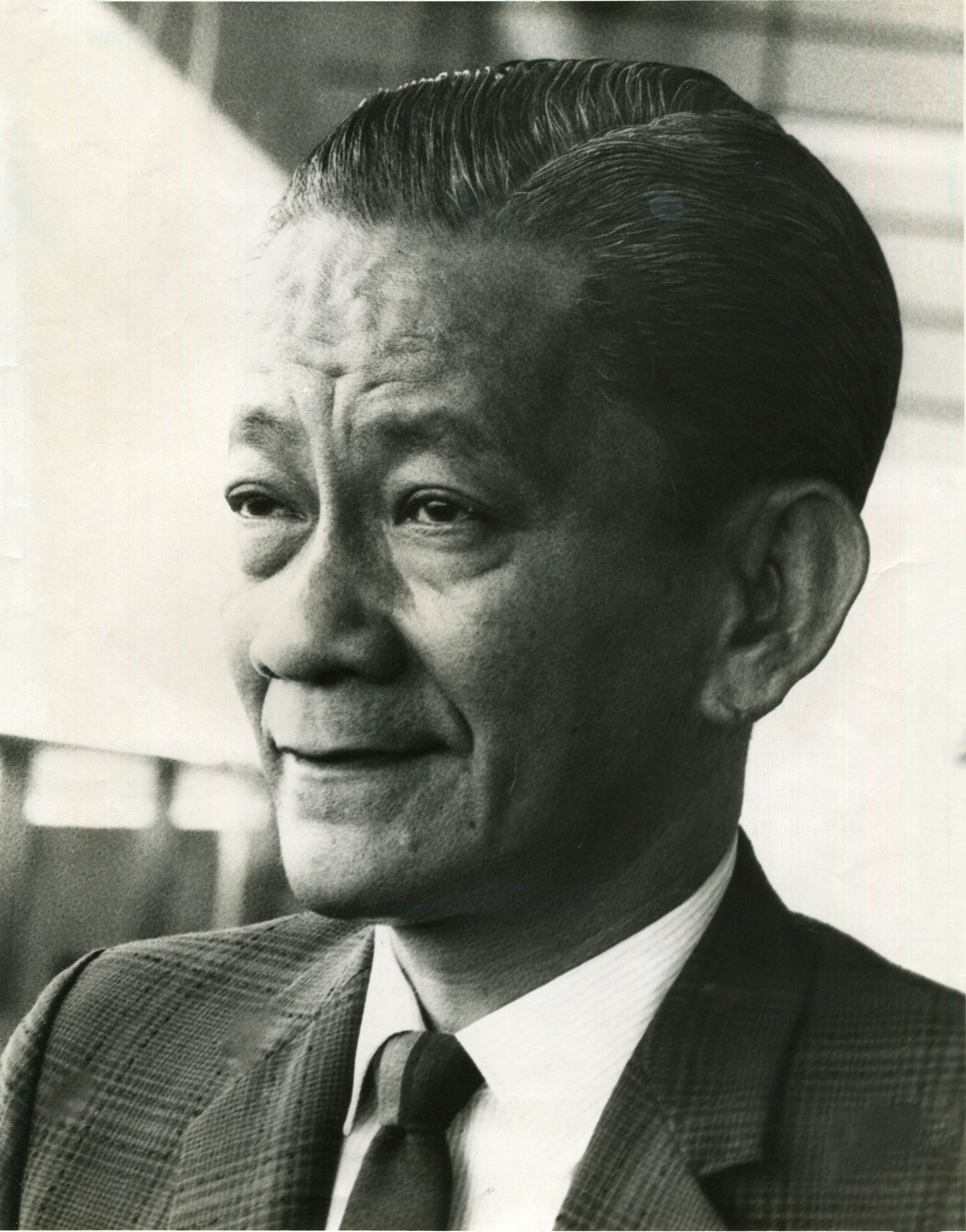

Senator of the Philippines
- In office December 30, 1965 – December 30, 1971

13th Mayor of Cebu City
- In office December 31, 1971 – September 17, 1972
- Vice Mayor: Eulogio Enriquez Borres
- Preceded by: Florencio S. Urot
- Succeeded by: Eulogio Enriquez Borres
- In office December 30, 1967 – January 3, 1968
- Vice Mayor: Eulogio Enriquez Borres
- Preceded by: Carlos Jurado Cuizon
- Succeeded by: Eulogio Enriquez Borres
- In office December 30, 1963 – September 16, 1965
- Vice Mayor: Carlos Jurado Cuizon
- Preceded by: Mario Diez Ortiz
- Succeeded by: Carlos Jurado Cuizon
- In office December 30, 1959 – January 1, 1960
- Vice Mayor: Carlos Jurado Cuizon
- Preceded by: Ramon Gonzales Duterte
- Succeeded by: Carlos Jurado Cuizon
- In office December 30, 1955 – September 12, 1957
- Vice Mayor: Ramon Gonzales Duterte
- Preceded by: Pedro Clavano / Jose V. Rodriguez
- Succeeded by: Ramon Gonzales Duterte

15th Governor of Cebu
- In office December 30, 1951 – December 30, 1955
- Preceded by: Manuel Cuenco
- Succeeded by: Jose Briones

Member of the Philippine House of Representatives from Cebu’s 2nd District
- In office March 18, 1957 – December 30, 1961
- Preceded by: Pedro T. Lopez
- Succeeded by: Jose Briones

Personal details
- Born: Sergio Veloso Osmeña Jr. December 4, 1916 Cebu, Cebu, Philippine Islands
- Died: March 26, 1984 (aged 67) Los Angeles, California, U.S.
- Party: Liberal (1955–1957; 1961–1984)
- Other political affiliations: Nacionalista (1957–1961)
- Spouse: Lourdes de la Rama (m. 1942)
- Children: Sergio Osmeña III; María Victoria Osmeña; Esteban Osmeña; Tomas Osmeña; Georgia Osmeña
- Education: New York University (BS)
- Occupation: Politician
- Nickname(s): Serging, S.O.J.

Sergio "Serging" Veloso Osmeña Jr. (December 4, 1916 – March 26, 1984) was a Filipino politician who served as mayor of Cebu City and as a Senator of the Philippines. He ran for vice president in the 1961 presidential election, and ran against Ferdinand Marcos for the presidency in the 1969 presidential election.

He was the son of Sergio Osmeña, the fourth president of the Philippines. His sons, Sergio "Serge" Osmeña III and Tomas Osmeña, also entered politics notably as senator of the Philippines and Mayor of Cebu City, respectively.

== Early life ==
Osmeña was born in the town of Cebu on December 4, 1916, to Sergio Osmeña Sr., then the House Speaker and representative from the 2nd district of Cebu, and Estefania Chiong Veloso. He had a brother, Emilio Osmeña, father of Emilio Mario Osmeña Jr. and John Henry Osmeña. He graduated Associate of Arts, cum laude, from the Ateneo de Manila University on 1935, and Bachelor of Science in commerce, summa cum laude, from New York University in 1936. After graduating which Osmeña opened an import-export business in New York.

== Actions in World War II ==
Osmeña collaborated with the Japanese in World War II. He escaped justice and returned to the Philippines and became President of the De La Rama Steamship Company, Inc.

== Political career ==
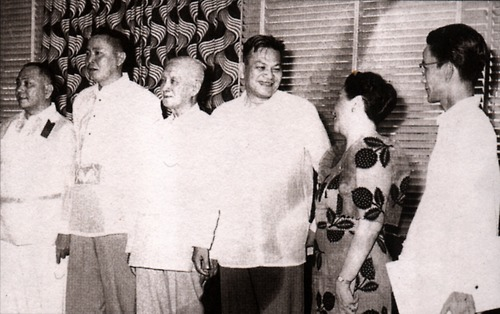
Cebu City Mayor Sergio Osmeña Jr. (right) with Presidents Ramon Magasaysay (4th from left) and Sergio Osmeña (3rd from left)

In 1951, he was elected provincial Governor of Cebu. He was later elected Mayor of Cebu City for three terms in 1955, 1959 and 1963. His tenure as mayor was criticized by his own father, former president Sergio Osmeña Sr., as being "extravagant, corrupt, and arbitrary".

Elected as representative for the second district of Cebu in 1958, Osmeña's notable work as fiscalizer brought him recognition from the Congressional Press Club which voted him as one of the Ten Most Outstanding Congressmen of 1959. On July 19, 1960, Osmeña was suspended by Congress after he accused President Carlos P. Garcia of bribery related to his veto of a "rice and corn" bill, and a few days later, President Garcia affirmed that Osmeña forfeited his position as mayor after attending the first session of Congress in January 1960.

In 1961, Osmeña ran for Vice President of the Philippines as an independent, but lost to Senator Emmanuel Pelaez. In the November 1965 elections, he won a seat in the Philippine Senate.

=== 1969 presidential campaign ===
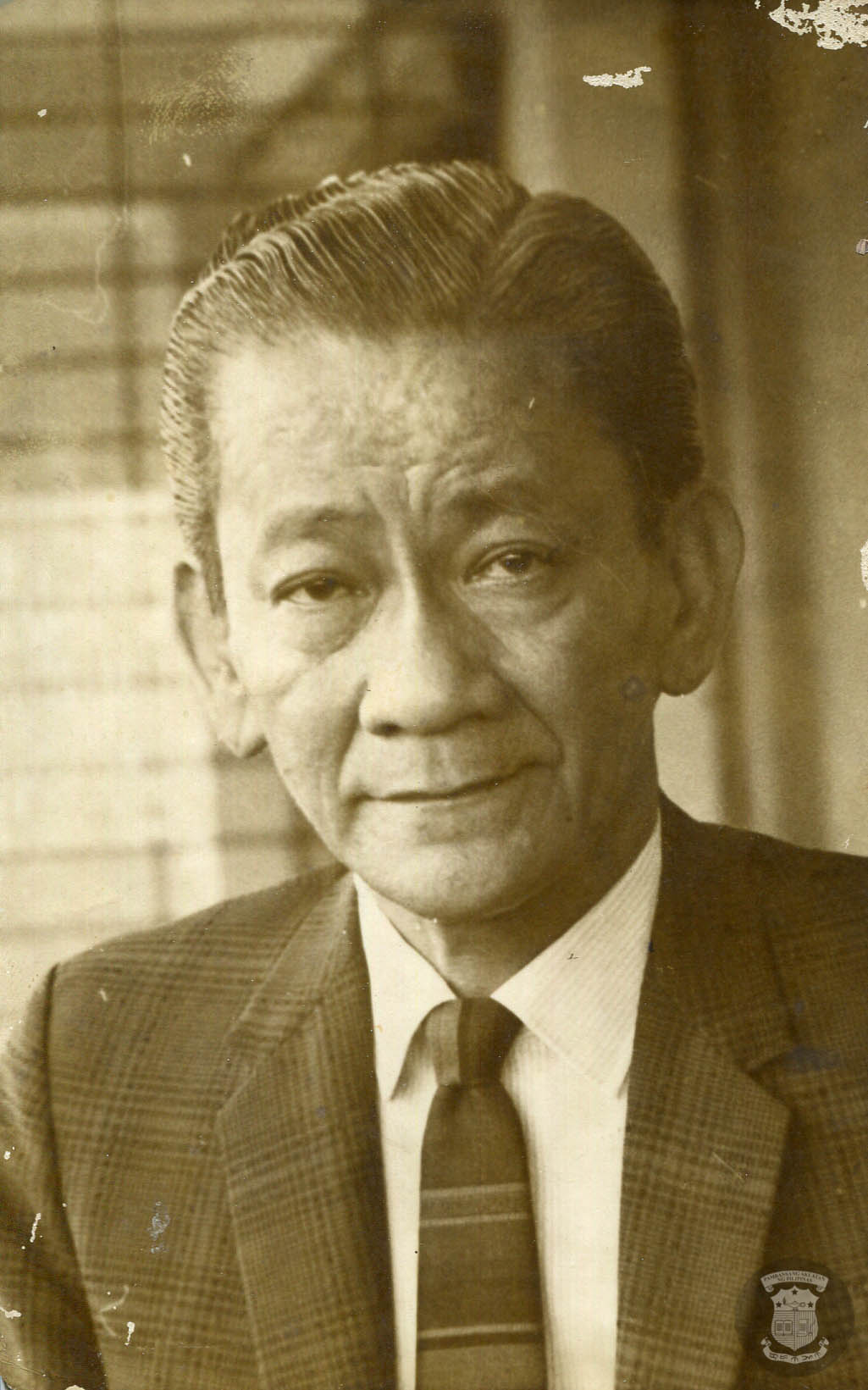
Serging in 1969

Osmeña publicly opposed the Marcos administration.

On April 5, 1969, at the St. Francis Hotel, San Francisco, Marcos exposed Osmeña of collaborating with the Japanese in World War II.

Later on June 15, Osmeña won the Liberal Party nomination for President of the Philippines, and would run against incumbent President Ferdinand Marcos for the 1969 Philippine presidential election. Marcos spent US$50 million in infrastructure projects in an effort to improve the country. This rapid campaign spending was so massive that it would be responsible for the Balance of Payments Crisis of 1970, whose inflationary effect would cause social unrest leading all the way up to the proclamation of Martial Law in 1972. Marcos was reported to have spent ₱100 (equivalent to ₱5,424 in 2021) for every ₱1 (equivalent to ₱54.24 in 2021) that Osmena spent, using up to ₱24,000,000 (equivalent to ₱1,301,856,337 in 2021) in Cebu alone.

Despite Marcos' win, Osmeña never conceded defeat.

=== Subsequent activities and exile ===
Following his defeat, Osmeña continued as a leader in the Liberal Party. According to historian Joseph Scalice, Osmeña organized a covert organization called the Workshop Group, led by Terry Adevoso, that plotted to assassinate president Marcos in the early 1970s by hiring foreign contract killers. The hitmen's numerous attempts were thwarted, however, due to a mole in the organization named Jose Maristela that informed Marcos of their plans.

On August 21, 1971, Osmeña along with prominent members of the Liberal Party held a proclamation rally at the Plaza Miranda in Quiapo, Manila. While on stage with the other Liberal leaders, two hand grenades were thrown on stage, injuring Osmeña. The Plaza Miranda bombing injured 95, including Osmeña, and killed nine. Afterwards, Osmeña left for the United States and lived in Beverly Hills, Los Angeles, California.

Marcos proclaimed martial law in September 1972, citing the threat of the Communist Party of the Philippines and the rebellion of the Muslim Independence Movement. Marcos also submitted documents to the US Congress charging that the declaration of martial law was also due to a plot to kill him. He claimed that Osmeña was a key figure in the plot, although no formal charges were filed against him. Osmeña's son, Serge, was captured and imprisoned due to allegations that he was involved in the assassination attempts.

== Personal life ==
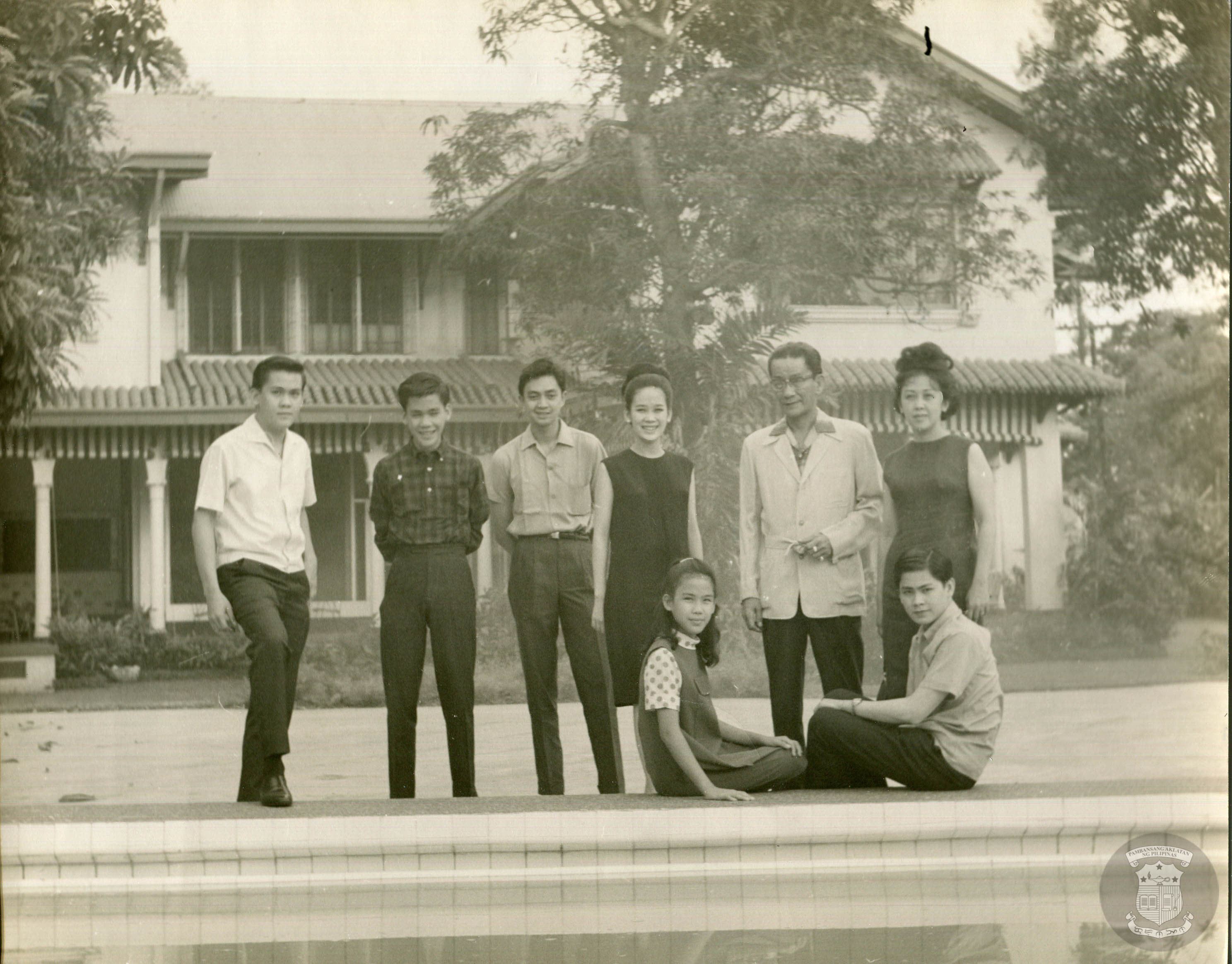
Osmeña family

Osmeña was married to Lourdes de la Rama of Negros Occidental with whom he had five children: Sergio III ("Serge"), Tomas ("Tommy"), Maria Victoria ("Minnie"), Esteban ("Stevie"), and Georgia.

== Death ==
Osmeña died of respiratory failure at the age of 67 on March 26, 1984, at Cedars Sinai Medical Center in Los Angeles, California.

== Historical commemoration ==
In 2014, a life-size brass statue of Osmeña was erected at Plaza Sugbu in Cebu City. It was designed by national artist for sculpture Eduardo Castrillo and commissioned by Insular Life.

In December 2025, the Cebu City Council proposed the renaming of Cebu South Coastal Road in Cebu City to Sergio Osmeña Jr. Boulevard in his honor.
