= List of Philippine presidential election results by province =

The following is a chronological table of Philippine presidential elections by province, and in some instances, by cities. The presidential election is a direct election by popular vote, where the winner with the most votes wins; there is no runoff.

== Key ==
=== President ===
Color	Meaning	Entered candidates for president																
Color	Meaning	35	41	46	49	53	57	61	65	69	81	86	92	98	04	10	16	22
Aksyon	Aksyon Demokratiko													Yes	Yes			Yes
DPP	Democratic Party of the Philippines																	Yes
KTPNAN	Katipunan ng Kamalayang Kayumanggi																	Yes
KBL	Kilusang Bagong Lipunan										Yes	Yes	Yes					
Lakas; LKS-KAM	Lakas-NUCD/Lakas-NUCD-UMDP/Lakas–CMD; Lakas Kampi CMD/Lakas–CMD												Yes	Yes	Yes	Yes		
LDP	Laban ng Demokratikong Pilipino												Yes					
LP	Liberal Party			Yes	Yes	Yes	Yes	Yes	Yes	Yes			Yes	Yes		Yes	Yes	
NP	Nacionalista Party	Yes	Yes	Yes	Yes	Yes	Yes	Yes	Yes	Yes	Yes		Yes			Yes		
NCP	Nationalist Citizens' Party								Yes									
NPC	Nationalist People's Coalition												Yes					
PDP-Laban	Partido Demokratiko Pilipino-Lakas ng Bayan											Yes					Yes	
PDSP	Partido Demokratiko Sosyalista ng Pilipinas																	Yes
PFP	Partido Federal ng Pilipinas																	Yes
PLM	Partido Lakas ng Masa																	Yes
PRP	People's Reform Party												Yes	Yes			Yes	
PROMDI	Probinsya Muna Development Initiative													Yes				Yes
PPP	Progressive Party of the Philippines						Yes		Yes									
LAMMP; KNP; PMP	Laban ng Makabayang Masang Pilipino; Koalisyon ng Nagkakaisang Pilipino; Pwersa ng Masang Pilipino													Yes	Yes	Yes		
Reporma	Partido para sa Demokratikong RepormaLapiang Manggagawa													Yes				
UNA	United Nationalist Alliance																Yes	
Ind	Independent	Yes				Yes		Yes	Yes	Yes	Yes			Yes		Yes	Yes	Yes

=== Vice-President ===
Color	Meaning	Entered candidates for vice-president																
Color	Meaning	35	41	46	49	53	57	61	65	69	81	86	92	98	04	10	16	22
Aksyon	Aksyon Demokratiko													Yes	Yes			Yes
DPP	Democratic Party of the Philippines																	Yes
KTPNAN	Katipunan ng Kamalayang Kayumanggi																	Yes
KBL	Kilusang Bagong Lipunan											Yes	Yes			Yes		
LPP	Labor Party Philippines																	Yes
Lakas; LKS-KAM	Lakas-NUCD/Lakas-NUCD-UMDP/Lakas–CMD; Lakas Kampi CMD/Lakas–CMD												Yes	Yes	Yes	Yes		Yes
LDP	Laban ng Demokratikong Pilipino												Yes	Yes				
LP	Liberal Party			Yes	Yes	Yes	Yes	Yes	Yes	Yes		Yes		Yes		Yes	Yes	Yes
NP	Nacionalista Party	Yes	Yes	Yes	Yes	Yes	Yes	Yes	Yes	Yes			Yes				Yes	
NPC	Nationalist People's Coalition												Yes			Yes		Yes
PDP-Laban	Partido Demokratiko Pilipino-Lakas ng Bayan											Yes	Yes			Yes		
PLM	Partido Lakas ng Masa																	Yes
PRP	People's Reform Party												Yes					
PROMDI	Probinsya Muna Development Initiative													Yes				Yes
PPP	Progressive Party of the Philippines						Yes		Yes									
LAMMP; KNP; PMP	Laban ng Makabayang Masang Pilipino; Koalisyon ng Nagkakaisang Pilipino; Pwersa ng Masang Pilipino													Yes	Yes			
Reporma	Partido para sa Demokratikong Reporma-Lapiang Manggagawa													Yes				
UNA	United Nationalist Alliance																Yes	
Ind	Independent								Yes							Yes	Yes	

== Chronological ==
=== For President ===
Province/city	2022	2016	2010	2004	1998	1992	1986	1981	1969	1965	1961	1957	1953	1949^{1}	1946^{2}	1941	1935
Luzon group of islands
Abra	PFP	UNA	PMP	KNP	LAMMP	NPC	KBL	KBL	NP	NP	LP	NP	LP	LP	(Roxas)	NP	NP
Albay	(Robredo)	LP	LP	Aksyon	Aksyon	LP	UNIDO	KBL	NP	NP	LP	LP	NP	NP	(Roxas)	NP	NP
Apayao^{4}	PFP	UNA	PMP	KNP	LAMMP	(see Kalinga)				(see Mountain Province)							
Aurora^{5}	PFP	(Poe)	PMP	KNP	LAMMP	NPC	(see Quezon)										
Baguio	PFP	PDP-Laban	LP	Lakas	Lakas	KBL	KBL	KBL	(see Benguet)	(see Mountain Province)							
Bataan	PFP	PDP-Laban	LP	KNP	LAMMP	NPC	UNIDO	KBL	NP	LP	LP	PPP	NP	NP	(Roxas)	NP	NP
Batanes	(Robredo)	LP	LP	Lakas	LP	Lakas	KBL	KBL	NP	LP	LP	NP	NP	LP	(Roxas)	NP	NP
Batangas	PFP	PDP-Laban	LP	KNP	Reporma	NP	UNIDO	KBL	NP	NP	LP	NCP	NP	NP	(Roxas)	NP	NP
Benguet^{4}	PFP	(Poe)	LP	Lakas	LAMMP	LDP	KBL	KBL	NP	(see Mountain Province)							
Bulacan	PFP	PDP-Laban	LP	KNP	LAMMP	PRP	UNIDO	KBL	NP	NP	LP	LP	NP	NP	(Roxas)	NP	NP
Cagayan	PFP	UNA	PMP	KNP	(Enrile)	KBL	KBL	KBL	NP	NP	LP	NP	NP	LP	(Osmeña)	NP	NP
Camarines Norte	(Robredo)	(Poe)	LP	KNP	Aksyon	PRP	UNIDO	KBL	NP	NP	LP	LP	NP	LP	(Roxas)	NP	NP
Camarines Sur	(Robredo)	LP	LP	Aksyon	Aksyon	LP	UNIDO	KBL	NP	NP	LP	LP	NP	NP	(Roxas)	NP	NP
Catanduanes	(Robredo)	(Poe)	PMP	KNP	Aksyon	Lakas	UNIDO	KBL	NP	LP	NP	NP	NP		(Osmeña)	(see Albay)	
Cavite	PFP	PDP-Laban	LP	LDP	LAMMP	Lakas	UNIDO	KBL	NP	LP	LP	NP	NP	LP	(Roxas)	NP	NSP
Ifugao^{4}	PFP	(Poe)	LP	Lakas	LAMMP	LDP	KBL	KBL	NP	(see Mountain Province)							
Ilocos Norte	PFP	PDP-Laban	NP	KNP	LAMMP	KBL	KBL	KBL	NP	NP	LP	LP	LP	LP	(Roxas)	NP	RP
Ilocos Sur	PFP	(Poe)	NP	Lakas	LAMMP	KBL	KBL	KBL	NP	NP	LP	NP	LP	LP	(Roxas)	NP	NP
Isabela	PFP	UNA	PMP	KNP	LAMMP	NPC	KBL	KBL	NP	NP	LP	NP	NP	LP	(Roxas)	NP	NP
Kalinga^{4}	PFP	UNA	PMP	Lakas	LAMMP	KBL	KBL	KBL	NP	(see Mountain Province)							
La Union	PFP	(Poe)	PMP	KNP	LAMMP	NPC	KBL	KBL	NP	NP	LP	LP	LP	LP	(Roxas)	NP	NP
Laguna	PFP	PDP-Laban	LP	KNP	LAMMP	PRP	UNIDO	KBL	NP	NP	LP	NP	NP	NP	(Roxas)	NP	NP
Marinduque	PFP	(Poe)	LP	KNP	LAMMP	Lakas	UNIDO	KBL	NP	NP	LP	PPP	NP	NP	(Roxas)	NP	NP
Masbate	(Robredo)	LP	LP	Lakas	LAMMP	Lakas	UNIDO	KBL	NP	LP	LP	NP	NP		(Osmeña)	NP	NP
Metro Manila^{15}	PFP	PDP-Laban	LP	KNP	LAMMP	PRP	UNIDO	KBL	NP	NP	LP	LP	NP	NP	(Roxas)	NP	NP
Mountain Province^{4}	PFP	(Poe)	LP	Lakas	LAMMP	Lakas	KBL	KBL	NP	NP	LP	PPP	NP	LP	(Osmeña)	NP	NP
Nueva Ecija	PFP	(Poe)	PMP	KNP	LAMMP	NPC	UNIDO	KBL	NP	NP	LP	PPP	NP	LP	(Osmeña)	NP	NP
Nueva Vizcaya	PFP	(Poe)	PMP	KNP	LAMMP	NPC	KBL	KBL	NP	NP	LP	PPP	NP	LP	(Roxas)	NP	NP
Occidental Mindoro	PFP	LP	PMP	KNP	LAMMP	NPC	UNIDO	KBL	NP	NP	LP	NP	NP	NP	(see Oriental Mindoro)		
Oriental Mindoro	PFP	(Poe)	LP	KNP	LAMMP	LP	UNIDO	KBL	NP	NP	LP	NP	NP	NP	(Roxas)	NP	NP
Palawan	PFP	LP	PMP	KNP	LAMMP	LDP	UNIDO	KBL	NP	NP	LP	NP	NP	NP	(Roxas)	NP	NP
Pampanga	PFP	PDP-Laban	LP	Lakas	LAMMP	Lakas	UNIDO	KBL	LP	LP	LP	LP	NP	LP	(Osmeña)	NP	NP
Pangasinan	PFP	(Poe)	LP	KNP	Lakas	Lakas	KBL	KBL	NP	NP	LP	LP	NP	LP	(Roxas)	NP	NP
Quezon	(Robredo)	(Poe)	LP	KNP	LAMMP	Lakas	UNIDO	KBL	NP	NP	LP	NCP	NP	NP	(Roxas)	NP	NP
Quirino^{16}	PFP	UNA	PMP	KNP	LAMMP	LDP	(see Nueva Vizcaya)										
Rizal	PFP	PDP-Laban	LP	KNP	LAMMP	PRP	UNIDO	KBL	NP	NP	LP	LP	NP	LP	(Roxas)	NP	NP
Romblon	PFP	LP	LP	KNP	LAMMP	LDP	UNIDO	KBL	NP	LP	NP	NP	NP		(see Capiz)		NP
Sorsogon	(Robredo)	(Poe)	LP	KNP	Aksyon	Lakas	UNIDO	KBL	NP	LP	LP	NP	NP	LP	(Roxas)	NP	NP
Tarlac	PFP	LP	LP	Lakas	LAMMP	NPC	UNIDO	KBL	NP	LP	LP	PPP	NP	LP	(Osmeña)	NP	NP
Zambales	PFP	(Poe)	LP	KNP	LAMMP	PRP	UNIDO	KBL	NP	NP	LP	PPP	NP	NP	(Roxas)	NP	NP
Luzon (total)	PFP	PDP-Laban	LP	KNP	LAMMP	Lakas	UNIDO	KBL	NP	NP	LP	NP	NP	LP	(Roxas)	NP	NP
Province/city	2022	2016	2010	2004	1998	1992	1986	1981	1969	1965	1961	1957	1953	1949^{1}	1946^{2}	1941	1935
Visayas group of islands
Aklan	PFP	LP	LP	Lakas	LAMMP	PRP	KBL	KBL	NP	NP	LP	NP	(see Capiz)				
Antique	(Robredo)	LP	LP	Aksyon	LAMMP	PRP	KBL	KBL	LP	NP	LP	NP	NP	NP	(Roxas)	NP	NP
Bacolod	PFP	LP	LP	Lakas	PRP	PRP	KBL	(see Negros Occidental)									
Biliran^{6}	PFP	PDP-Laban	NP	Lakas	PROMDI	(see Leyte)											
Bohol	PFP	PDP-Laban	LP	Lakas	PROMDI	LDP	UNIDO	KBL	NP	NP	NP	NP	NP	NP	(Osmeña)	NP	NP
Capiz	(Robredo)	LP	LP	Lakas	LAMMP	PRP	KBL	KBL	NP	NP	LP	LP	NP	NP	(Roxas)	NP	NP
Cebu	PFP	PDP-Laban	LP	Lakas	PROMDI	Lakas	UNIDO	KBL	NP	LP	NP	NP	NP	LP	(Osmeña)	NP	NP
Cebu City	PFP	PDP-Laban	LP	Lakas	PROMDI	Lakas	UNIDO	(see Cebu)									
Eastern Samar^{11}	(Robredo)	LP	LP	Lakas	LAMMP	Lakas	KBL	KBL	NP	(see Samar)							
Guimaras^{12}	(Robredo)	LP	Lakas	PRP	(see Iloilo)												
Iloilo	(Robredo)	LP	LP	Lakas	PRP	PRP	KBL	KBL	NP	NP	LP	PPP	NP	LP	(Roxas)	NP	NP
Iloilo City	(Robredo)	LP	LP	Lakas	(Enrile)	PRP	(see Iloilo)										
Leyte	PFP	PDP-Laban	LP	Lakas	PROMDI	KBL	KBL	KBL	NP	NP	NP	NP	NP	LP	(Roxas)	NP	NP
Negros Occidental	(Robredo)	LP	LP	Lakas	LAMMP	PRP	KBL	KBL	NP	NP	LP	NP	NP	LP	(Roxas)	NP	NP
Negros Oriental	PFP	LP	LP	Lakas	LAMMP	Lakas	UNIDO	KBL	NP	NP	NP	NP	NP	LP	(Osmeña)	NP	NP
Northern Samar^{11}	(Robredo)	LP	LP	KNP	LAMMP	LP	KBL	KBL	NP	(see Samar)							
Samar^{11}	PFP	LP	LP	KNP	LAMMP	LP	KBL	KBL	NP	LP	LP	NP	NP	(Avelino)	(Roxas)	NP	NP
Siquijor	PFP	LP	LP	Lakas	Reporma	LDP	(see Negros Oriental)										
Southern Leyte	PFP	PDP-Laban	LP	Lakas	PROMDI	LDP	KBL	KBL	NP	NP	NP	(see Leyte)					
Visayas (total)	PFP	LP	LP	Lakas	LAMMP	PRP	KBL	KBL	NP	NP	LP	NP	NP	LP	(Roxas)	NP	NP
Province/city	2022	2016	2010	2004	1998	1992	1986	1981	1969	1965	1961	1957	1953	1949^{1}	1946^{2}	1941	1935
Mindanao group of islands
Agusan del Norte^{3}	PFP	PDP-Laban	LP	Lakas	LAMMP	Lakas	UNIDO	KBL	NP	LP	NP	NP	NP		(Roxas)	NP	NP
Agusan del Sur	PFP	LP	LP	Lakas	LAMMP	KBL	UNIDO	KBL	NP	(see Agusan del Norte)							
Basilan	PFP	PDP-Laban	LP	Lakas	LAMMP	Lakas	UNIDO	KBL	(see Zamboanga del Sur)								
Bukidnon	PFP	PDP-Laban	PMP	Lakas	PROMDI	Lakas	UNIDO	KBL	NP	LP	NP	NP	NP	LP	(Roxas)	NP	NP
Cagayan de Oro	PFP	PDP-Laban	PMP	KNP	LAMMP	LP	UNIDO	(see Misamis Oriental)									
Camiguin^{7}	PFP	LP	LKS-KAM	Lakas	LAMMP	LDP	UNIDO	KBL	NP	(see Misamis Oriental)							
Compostela Valley^{8}	PFP	PDP-Laban	PMP	Lakas	(see Davao del Norte)												
Cotabato	PFP	PDP-Laban	PMP	KNP	LAMMP	PRP	UNIDO	KBL	NP	LP	NP	NP	NP	LP	(Roxas)	NP	NP
Davao City	PFP	PDP-Laban	PMP	Lakas	LAMMP	Lakas	UNIDO	(see Davao del Sur)		(see Davao del Norte)							
Davao del Norte	PFP	PDP-Laban	PMP	KNP	LAMMP	Lakas	UNIDO	KBL	NP	NP	NP	NP	NP	NP	(Osmeña)	NP	NP
Davao del Sur^{9}	PFP	PDP-Laban	PMP	KNP	LAMMP	NPC	UNIDO	KBL	NP	(see Davao del Norte)							
Davao Occidental^{17}	PFP	PDP-Laban	(see Davao del Sur)							(see Davao del Norte)							
Davao Oriental^{9}	PFP	PDP-Laban	PMP	Lakas	LAMMP	LDP	UNIDO	KBL	NP	(see Davao del Norte)							
Dinagat Islands^{10}	PFP	PDP-Laban	LKS-KAM	(see Surigao del Norte)													
Lanao del Norte^{13}	PFP	PDP-Laban	PMP	KNP	LAMMP	Lakas	UNIDO	KBL	NP	LP	LP	NP	(see Lanao del Sur)				
Lanao del Sur	KTPNAN	PDP-Laban	LP	Lakas	LAMMP	Lakas	UNIDO	KBL	NP	LP	NP	NP	NP	LP	(Osmeña)	NP	NP
Maguindanao^{14}	PFP	PDP-Laban	LP	Lakas	LAMMP	LDP	UNIDO	KBL	(see Cotabato)								
Misamis Occidental	PFP	LP	LP	Lakas	PROMDI	Lakas	UNIDO	KBL	NP	NP	NP	NP	NP	LP	(Osmeña)	NP	NP
Misamis Oriental	PFP	PDP-Laban	PMP	KNP	LAMMP	LP	UNIDO	KBL	NP	LP	NP	NP	NP	LP	(Roxas)	NP	NP
Sarangani	PROMDI	PDP-Laban	PMP	KNP	LAMMP	(see South Cotabato)				(see Cotabato)							
South Cotabato^{14}	PFP	PDP-Laban	PMP	KNP	LAMMP	PRP	UNIDO	KBL	NP	(see Cotabato)							
Sultan Kudarat^{14}	PFP	PDP-Laban	PMP	Lakas	LAMMP	PRP	UNIDO	KBL	(see Cotabato)								
Sulu	PFP	PDP-Laban	LP	Lakas	LAMMP	LDP	UNIDO	KBL	NP	LP	LP	LP	NP	LP	(Osmeña)	NP	NP
Surigao del Norte	PFP	PDP-Laban	LP	Lakas	PROMDI	Lakas	UNIDO	KBL	NP	LP	NP	NP	NP		(Roxas)	NP	NP
Surigao del Sur	PFP	PDP-Laban	LP	Lakas	PROMDI	Lakas	UNIDO	KBL	NP	NP	NP	(see Surigao del Norte)					
Tawi-Tawi	PFP	PDP-Laban	LP	KNP	PRP	LDP	UNIDO	KBL	(see Sulu)								
Zamboanga City	PFP	PDP-Laban	PMP	Lakas	PROMDI	PRP	UNIDO	(see Zamboanga del Sur)									
Zamboanga del Norte	PFP	LP	LP	Lakas	PROMDI	Lakas	UNIDO	KBL	NP	NP	LP	NP	NP	(see Zamboanga del Sur)			
Zamboanga del Sur	PFP	(Poe)	LP	Lakas	LAMMP	Lakas	UNIDO	KBL	NP	NP	NP	NP	NP	NP	(Osmeña)	NP	NP
Zamboanga Sibugay	PFP	PDP-Laban	PMP	KNP	(see Zamboanga del Sur)												
Mindanao (total)	PFP	PDP-Laban	LP	Lakas	LAMMP	Lakas	UNIDO	KBL	NP	LP	NP	NP	NP	LP	(Roxas)	NP	NP
Over-all Totals
Province/city	2022	2016	2010	2004	1998	1992	1986	1981	1969	1965	1961	1957	1953	1949^{1}	1946^{2}	1941	1935
Luzon (total)	PFP	PDP-Laban	LP	KNP	LAMMP	Lakas	UNIDO	KBL	NP	NP	LP	NP	NP	LP	(Roxas)	NP	NP
Visayas (total)	PFP	LP	LP	Lakas	LAMMP	PRP	KBL	KBL	NP	NP	LP	NP	NP	LP	(Roxas)	NP	NP
Mindanao (total)	PFP	PDP-Laban	LP	Lakas	LAMMP	Lakas	UNIDO	KBL	NP	LP	NP	NP	NP	LP	(Roxas)	NP	NP
Philippines (total)	PFP	PDP-Laban	LP	Lakas	LAMMP	Lakas	UNIDO	KBL	NP	NP	LP	NP	NP	LP	(Roxas)	NP	NP

==== Notes ====
^1 In 1949, two candidates from the Liberal Party contested the election: Jose Avelino and Elpidio Quirino. Avelino did not win at least a plurality of votes in a single province except his home province of Samar.
^2 In 1946, two candidates from the Nacionalista Party contested the election: Sergio Osmeña and Manuel Roxas. Both candidates won a plurality votes in more than one province.
^3 Prior to 1969, Agusan del Norte and Agusan del Sur were part of the province of Agusan. Agusan was split into two provinces on 1967.
^4 In 1966, the Mountain Province is divided into Kalinga-Apayao, Benguet, Ifugao and a smaller Mountain Province. Kalinga-Apayao was separated in 1995 as Kalinga and Apayao.
^5 Named after the wife of Philippine President Manuel Luis Quezon, Maria Aurora Aragon-Quezon, the province was separated from the province of Quezon on August 13, 1979. Prior to that, it became a sub-province of Quezon after Aurora's death in 1951.
^6 On April 8, 1959, Republic Act No. 2141 was signed into law effectively making Biliran a sub-province of Leyte. The island was only made an independent province on May 11, 1992 by virtue of Republic Act No. 7160.
^7 Prior to 1969, Camiguin is a sub-province under the jurisdiction of Misamis Oriental. It became an independent province on June 18, 1966.
^8 The eastern part of Davao del Norte on January 30, 1998 as the province of Compostela Valley by virtue of Republic Act No. 8470.
^9 The present-day Davao Region used to be a whole province simply known as Davao. This original province was split into three: Davao del Norte, Davao Oriental, and Davao del Sur when Republic Act No. 4867.
^10 The province of Dinagat Islands had been a part of the First District of Surigao del Norte until becoming a province on its own on December 2, 2006. On February 11, 2010, the Supreme Court of the Philippines declared the creation of Dinagat Islands null and void on grounds of failure to meet land area and population requirements for the creation of local government units. Dinagat Islands then reverted to Surigao del Norte. On March 30, 2011, however, the Supreme Court reversed its ruling from the previous year, and upheld the constitutionality of RA 9355 and the creation of Dinagat Islands as a province.
^11 On June 19, 1965 the Philippine Congress approved Republic Act No. 4221 dividing the province of Samar into three provinces: Northern Samar, Eastern Samar, and Western Samar. On June 21, 1969, Western Samar was renamed Samar.
^12 Guimaras first gained its status as a sub-province of Iloilo by virtue of R.A. 4667, which was enacted by Congress on 18 June 1966. It was proclaimed as a regular and full-fledged province on 22 May 1992 after a plebiscite was conducted to ratify the approval of its conversion.
^13 The province of Lanao was divided into Lanao del Norte and Lanao del Sur through Republic Act No. 2228 on May 22, 1959.
^14 The former province of Cotabato was once the largest in the Philippines. In 1966, South Cotabato was created as a separate province. On November 22, 1973, by virtue of Presidential Decree No. 341, what remained of the old Cotabato was further divided into the provinces of North Cotabato, Maguindanao, and Sultan Kudarat. North Cotabato was later renamed Cotabato through Batas Pambansa Blg. 660[3] approved on December 19, 1983.
^15 Prior to 1981, only includes results from the City of Manila. Metro Manila was created in 1975, prior to that almost all of Manila was a part of Rizal, with Valenzuela a part of Bulacan, with the city of Manila independent.
^16 Quirino province acquired its juridical personality as a result of the division of the provinces of Nueva Vizcaya and Isabela on June 18, 1966 under RA 4734. Quirino, named after the late president Elpidio Quirino, was created as a sub-province of Nueva Vizcaya in 1966. It became a full province in 1971.
^17 The province of Davao Occidental was created from the comprising five of the eight municipalities that constitute the 2nd district of Davao del Sur by the virtue of RA No. 10360 was signed by President Benigno Aquino III on January 14, 2013. Following the passage of the said charter province, a plebiscite was held on October 28, 2013, coinciding with the Barangay elections were held on the said date; and the majority of the votes cast by votes were "Yes", ratifying the province, while "No" is the very few number of voters' cast, about on opposing the said creation.

=== For Vice-President ===
Province/city	2022	2016	2010	2004	1998	1992	1986	1969	1965	1961	1957	1953	1949^{1}	1946^{2}	1941	1935
Luzon group of islands
Abra	Lakas	(Marcos)	PDP-Laban	KNP	Lakas	NPC	KBL	NP	NP	LP	LP	LP	LP	(Quirino)	NP	NP
Albay	LP	LP	LP	Lakas	Lakas	NPC	PDP-Laban	NP	NP	LP	LP	NP	NP	(Quirino)	NP	NP
Apayao^{4}	Lakas	(Marcos)	PDP-Laban	KNP	Lakas	(see Kalinga)			(see Mountain Province)							
Aurora^{5}	Lakas	(Marcos)	PDP-Laban	KNP	LAMMP	NPC	(see Quezon)									
Baguio	Lakas	(Marcos)	LP	Lakas	Lakas	PRP	KBL	(see Benguet)	(see Mountain Province)							
Bataan	Lakas	(Marcos)	PDP-Laban	KNP	Lakas	NPC	PDP-Laban	NP	NP	LP	LP	NP	NP	(Quirino)	NP	NP
Batanes	Lakas	LP	LP	Lakas	Lakas	NPC	KBL	NP	LP	LP	LP	NP		(Quirino)	NP	NP
Batangas	Lakas	LP	PDP-Laban	KNP	Reporma	NP	PDP-Laban	NP	NP	(Osmeña)	NP	NP	NP	(Quirino)	NP	NP
Benguet^{4}	Lakas	(Marcos)	LP	Lakas	Lakas	PRP	KBL	NP	(see Mountain Province)							
Bulacan	Lakas	(Marcos)	PDP-Laban	KNP	Lakas	NPC	PDP-Laban	NP	NP	LP	LP	NP	NP	(Quirino)	NP	NP
Cagayan	Lakas	(Marcos)	PDP-Laban	KNP	Lakas	NPC	KBL	NP	NP	LP	LP	NP	LP	(Rodriguez)	NP	NP
Camarines Norte	LP	LP	PDP-Laban	KNP	Lakas	NPC	PDP-Laban	NP	LP	(Osmeña)	LP	NP	LP	(Quirino)	NP	NP
Camarines Sur	LP	LP	LP	Lakas	Lakas	NPC	PDP-Laban	NP	NP	LP	LP	NP	NP	(Quirino)	NP	NP
Catanduanes	LP	LP	PDP-Laban	KNP	PRP	NPC	PDP-Laban	NP	LP	NP	NP	NP		(Rodriguez)	(see Albay)	
Cavite	Lakas	(Marcos)	PDP-Laban	LDP	Lakas	NPC	PDP-Laban	NP	NP	LP	LP	NP	LP	(Quirino)	NP	NSP
Ifugao^{4}	Lakas	(Marcos)	LP	Lakas	Lakas	NPC	KBL	NP	(see Mountain Province)							
Ilocos Norte	Lakas	(Marcos)	PDP-Laban	KNP	Lakas	NPC	KBL	NP	NP	LP	LP	LP	LP	(Quirino)	NP	NP
Ilocos Sur	Lakas	(Marcos)	LP	Lakas	Lakas	NPC	KBL	NP	NP	LP	LP	LP	LP	(Quirino)	NP	NP
Isabela	Lakas	(Marcos)	PDP-Laban	KNP	Lakas	NPC	KBL	NP	NP	LP	LP	LP		(Quirino)	NP	NP
Kalinga^{4}	Lakas	(Marcos)	PDP-Laban	Lakas	Lakas	NPC	KBL	NP	(see Mountain Province)							
La Union	Lakas	(Marcos)	PDP-Laban	KNP	Lakas	NPC	KBL	NP	NP	LP	LP	LP	LP	(Quirino)	NP	NP
Laguna	Lakas	(Marcos)	PDP-Laban	KNP	Lakas	NPC	PDP-Laban	NP	NP	(Osmeña)	LP	NP	NP	(Quirino)	NP	NP
Marinduque	Lakas	LP	LP	KNP	Lakas	NPC	PDP-Laban	NP	LP	(Osmeña)	NP	NP	NP	(Quirino)	NP	NP
Masbate	Lakas	LP	LP	Lakas	Lakas	NPC	PDP-Laban	LP	NP	(Osmeña)	LP	NP	LP	(Rodriguez)	NP	NP
Metro Manila^{15}	Lakas	(Marcos)	PDP-Laban	KNP	Lakas	NPC	KBL	NP	LP	LP	LP	NP	LP	(Quirino)	NP	NP
Mountain Province^{4}	Lakas	(Marcos)	LP	Lakas	Lakas	NPC	KBL	NP	NP	LP	LP	NP	LP	(Rodriguez)	NP	NP
Nueva Ecija	Lakas	(Marcos)	PDP-Laban	KNP	Lakas	NPC	PDP-Laban	NP	NP	LP	LP	NP	LP	(Rodriguez)	NP	NP
Nueva Vizcaya	Lakas	(Marcos)	PDP-Laban	Lakas	Lakas	NPC	KBL	NP	NP	(Osmeña)	LP	NP		(Quirino)	NP	NP
Occidental Mindoro	Lakas	LP	PDP-Laban	KNP	Lakas	NPC	PDP-Laban	NP	NP	LP	NP	NP	NP	(see Oriental Mindoro)		
Oriental Mindoro	Lakas	LP	LP	Lakas	Lakas	NPC	PDP-Laban	NP	NP	(Osmeña)	NP	NP	NP	(Quirino)	NP	NP
Palawan	Lakas	LP	PDP-Laban	KNP	Lakas	LDP	PDP-Laban	NP	LP	LP	NP	NP	LP	(Quirino)	NP	NP
Pampanga	Lakas	(Marcos)	LP	Lakas	Lakas	Lakas	PDP-Laban	LP	LP	NP	LP	NP	LP	(Rodriguez)	NP	NP
Pangasinan	Lakas	(Marcos)	LP	Lakas	Lakas	NPC	KBL	NP	NP	LP	LP	NP	LP	(Quirino)	NP	NP
Quezon	Lakas	LP	PDP-Laban	KNP	LAMMP	NPC	PDP-Laban	NP	LP	LP	NCP	NP	NP	(Quirino)	NP	NP
Quirino^{16}	Lakas	(Marcos)	PDP-Laban	KNP	Lakas	NPC	(see Nueva Vizcaya)									
Rizal	Lakas	(Marcos)	PDP-Laban	KNP	Lakas	NPC	PDP-Laban	NP	NP	NP	LP	NP	LP	(Quirino)	NP	NP
Romblon	Lakas	LP	LP	KNP	Lakas	NPC	PDP-Laban	NP	LP	NP	NP	NP	LP	(see Capiz)		NP
Sorsogon	NPC	(Escudero)	PDP-Laban	KNP	Lakas	NPC	PDP-Laban	NP	LP	LP	LP	NP	LP	(Quirino)	NP	NP
Tarlac	Lakas	LP	LP	Lakas	Lakas	NPC	PDP-Laban	NP	LP	LP	LP	NP	LP	(Rodriguez)	NP	NP
Zambales	Lakas	(Marcos)	LP	KNP	Lakas	PRP	PDP-Laban	LP	NP	(Osmeña)	LP	NP	LP	(Quirino)	NP	NP
Luzon (total)	Lakas	(Marcos)	PDP-Laban	KNP	Lakas	NPC	PDP-Laban	NP	NP	LP	LP	NP	LP	(Quirino)	NP	NP
Province/city	2022	2016	2010	2004	1998	1992	1986	1969	1965	1961	1957	1953	1949^{1}	1946^{2}	1941	1935
Visayas group of islands
Aklan	Lakas	LP	LP	Lakas	LAMMP	NPC	PDP-Laban	NP	LP	(Osmeña)	LP	(see Capiz)				
Antique	Lakas	LP	LP	KNP	Lakas	PRP	PDP-Laban	LP	LP	LP	LP	NP	NP	(Quirino)	NP	NP
Bacolod	Lakas	LP	LP	Lakas	Lakas	PRP	KBL	(see Negros Occidental)								
Biliran^{6}	Lakas	(Marcos)	PDP-Laban	Lakas	Lakas	(see Leyte)										
Bohol	Lakas	LP	LP	Lakas	Lakas	LDP	PDP-Laban	NP	NP	NP	NP	NP		(Rodriguez)	NP	NP
Capiz	Lakas	LP	LP	Lakas	Lakas	PRP	PDP-Laban	NP	LP	LP	LP	LP	LP	(Quirino)	NP	NP
Cebu	Lakas	LP	LP	Lakas	Lakas	LDP	PDP-Laban	NP	LP	(Osmeña)	NP	NP	LP	(Rodriguez)	NP	NP
Cebu City	Lakas	(Cayetano)	LP	Lakas	Lakas	LDP	PDP-Laban	(see Cebu)								
Eastern Samar^{11}	Lakas	LP	PDP-Laban	Lakas	Lakas	LP	KBL	NP	(see Samar)							
Guimaras^{12}	LP	LP	LP	Lakas	Lakas	(see Iloilo)										
Iloilo	LP	LP	LP	Lakas	Lakas	PRP	PDP-Laban	NP	NP	(Osmeña)	LP	NP	LP	(Quirino)	NP	NP
Iloilo City	LP	LP	LP	Lakas	Lakas	PRP	(see Iloilo)									
Leyte	Lakas	(Marcos)	PDP-Laban	Lakas	Lakas	LDP	KBL	NP	NP	LP	NP	NP	LP	(Quirino)	NP	NP
Negros Occidental	Lakas	LP	LP	Lakas	Lakas	PRP	PDP-Laban	NP	NP	(Osmeña)	LP	NP	LP	(Quirino)	NP	NP
Negros Oriental	Lakas	LP	LP	Lakas	Lakas	LDP	PDP-Laban	NP	NP	NP	NP	NP	LP	(Rodriguez)	NP	NP
Northern Samar^{11}	Lakas	LP	LP	KNP	Lakas	LP	KBL	LP	(see Samar)							
Samar^{11}	Lakas	LP	PDP-Laban	KNP	Lakas	LP	KBL	NP	LP	LP	NP	NP	(Francisco)	(Quirino)	NP	NP
Siquijor	Lakas	LP	LP	Lakas	Lakas	LDP	(see Negros Oriental)									
Southern Leyte	Lakas	LP	LP	Lakas	Lakas	LDP	KBL	NP	NP	(Osmeña)	(see Leyte)					
Visayas (total)	Lakas	LP	LP	Lakas	Lakas	LDP	PDP-Laban	NP	NP	(Osmeña)	LP	NP	LP	(Quirino)	NP	NP
Province/city	2022	2016	2010	2004	1998	1992	1986	1969	1965	1961	1957	1953	1949^{1}	1946^{2}	1941	1935
Mindanao group of islands
Agusan del Norte^{3}	Lakas	LP	LP	Lakas	Lakas	NPC	PDP-Laban	NP	NP	LP	NP	NP		(Quirino)	NP	NP
Agusan del Sur	Lakas	LP	LP	Lakas	Lakas	NPC	KBL	NP	(see Agusan del Norte)							
Basilan	Lakas	LP	PDP-Laban	Lakas	Lakas	NPC	PDP-Laban	(see Zamboanga del Sur)								
Bukidnon	Lakas	LP	LP	Lakas	Lakas	NPC	PDP-Laban	NP	LP	LP	NP	NP	LP	(Quirino)	NP	NP
Cagayan de Oro	Lakas	(Marcos)	PDP-Laban	KNP	Lakas	LP	PDP-Laban	(see Misamis Oriental)								
Camiguin^{7}	Lakas	LP	LKS-KAM	KNP	Lakas	LDP	PDP-Laban	NP	(see Misamis Oriental)							
Compostela Valley^{8}	Lakas	(Cayetano)	PDP-Laban	Lakas	(see Davao del Norte)											
Cotabato	Lakas	(Marcos)	PDP-Laban	KNP	Lakas	NPC	PDP-Laban	NP	LP	LP	NP	NP	LP	(Quirino)	NP	NP
Davao City	Lakas	(Cayetano)	PDP-Laban	Lakas	Lakas	LDP	KBL	(see Davao del Sur)	(see Davao del Norte)							
Davao del Norte	Lakas	(Cayetano)	PDP-Laban	Lakas	Lakas	LP	PDP-Laban	NP	NP	(Osmeña)	NP	NP	NP	(Rodriguez)	NP	NP
Davao del Sur^{9}	Lakas	(Cayetano)	PDP-Laban	Lakas	Lakas	NPC	PDP-Laban	NP	(see Davao del Norte)							
Davao Occidental^{17}	Lakas	(Cayetano)	(see Davao del Sur)							(see Davao del Norte)						
Davao Oriental^{9}	Lakas	(Cayetano)	PDP-Laban	Lakas	Lakas	LDP	PDP-Laban	NP	(see Davao del Norte)							
Dinagat Islands^{10}	Lakas	(Marcos)	LKS-KAM	(see Surigao del Norte)												
Lanao del Norte^{13}	Lakas	(Marcos)	PDP-Laban	Lakas	Lakas	NPC	PDP-Laban	NP	LP	LP	NP	(see Lanao del Sur)				
Lanao del Sur	Lakas	LP	PDP-Laban	KNP	Lakas	NPC	PDP-Laban	NP	LP	NP	NP	NP		(Rodriguez)	NP	NP
Maguindanao^{14}	Lakas	LP	PDP-Laban	Lakas	Lakas	NPC	PDP-Laban	(see Cotabato)								
Misamis Occidental	Lakas	LP	LP	Lakas	Lakas	Lakas	PDP-Laban	NP	NP	LP	NP	NP	LP	(Rodriguez)	NP	NP
Misamis Oriental	Lakas	LP	PDP-Laban	KNP	Lakas	LP	PDP-Laban	NP	LP	NP	NP	NP	LP	(Quirino)	NP	NP
Sarangani	Lakas	(Marcos)	PDP-Laban	Lakas	Lakas	(see South Cotabato)			(see Cotabato)							
South Cotabato^{14}	Lakas	(Marcos)	PDP-Laban	KNP	PROMDI	NPC	PDP-Laban	NP	(see Cotabato)							
Sultan Kudarat^{14}	Lakas	(Marcos)	PDP-Laban	KNP	Lakas	NPC	PDP-Laban	(see Cotabato)								
Sulu	Lakas	(Marcos)	PDP-Laban	KNP	Lakas	LDP	PDP-Laban	NP	LP	LP	NP	LP	LP	(Rodriguez)	NP	NP
Surigao del Norte	Lakas	LP	LP	Lakas	Lakas	LDP	PDP-Laban	NP	LP	LP	NP	NP		(Quirino)	NP	NP
Surigao del Sur	Lakas	(Cayetano)	LP	Lakas	Lakas	LDP	PDP-Laban	NP	NP	LP	(see Surigao del Norte)					
Tawi-Tawi	Lakas	LP	PDP-Laban	KNP	Lakas	NPC	PDP-Laban	(see Sulu)								
Zamboanga City	Lakas	LP	PDP-Laban	Lakas	Lakas	NPC	PDP-Laban	(see Zamboanga del Sur)								
Zamboanga del Norte	Lakas	LP	LP	Lakas	Lakas	NPC	PDP-Laban	NP	NP	(Osmeña)	NP	NP	(see Zamboanga del Sur)			
Zamboanga del Sur	Lakas	(Marcos)	PDP-Laban	Lakas	Lakas	NPC	PDP-Laban	NP	LP	(Osmeña)	NP	NP	NP	(Rodriguez)	NP	NP
Zamboanga Sibugay	Lakas	LP	PDP-Laban	Lakas	(see Zamboanga del Sur)											
Mindanao (total)	Lakas	LP	PDP-Laban	Lakas	Lakas	NPC	PDP-Laban	NP	LP	LP	NP	NP	LP	(Quirino)	NP	NP
Over-all Totals
Province/city	2022	2016	2010	2004	1998	1992	1986	1969	1965	1961	1957	1953	1949^{1}	1946^{2}	1941	1935
Luzon (total)	Lakas	(Marcos)	PDP-Laban	KNP	Lakas	NPC	PDP-Laban	NP	NP	LP	LP	NP	LP	(Quirino)	NP	NP
Visayas (total)	Lakas	LP	LP	Lakas	Lakas	LDP	PDP-Laban	NP	NP	(Osmeña)	LP	NP	LP	(Quirino)	NP	NP
Mindanao (total)	Lakas	LP	PDP-Laban	Lakas	Lakas	NPC	PDP-Laban	NP	LP	LP	NP	NP	LP	(Quirino)	NP	NP
Philippines (total)	Lakas	LP	PDP-Laban	Lakas	Lakas	NPC	PDP-Laban	NP	NP	LP	LP	NP	LP	(Quirino)	NP	NP

==== Notes ====
^1 In 1949, two candidates from the Liberal Party contested the election: Jose Avelino with Vicente Francisco and Elpidio Quirino with Fernando Lopez. Avelino and Francisco did not win at least a plurality of votes in a single province except Avelino's home province of Samar.
^2 In 1946, two candidates from the Nacionalista Party contested the election: Sergio Osmeña and Manuel Roxas. Both candidates won a plurality votes in more than one province.
^3 Prior to 1969, Agusan del Norte and Agusan del Sur were part of the province of Agusan. Agusan was split into two provinces on 1967.
^4 In 1966, the Mountain Province is divided into Kalinga-Apayao, Benguet, Ifugao and a smaller Mountain Province. Kalinga-Apayao was separated in 1995 as Kalinga and Apayao.
^5 Named after the wife of Philippine President Manuel Luis Quezon, Maria Aurora Aragon-Quezon, the province was separated from the province of Quezon on August 13, 1979. Prior to that, it became a sub-province of Quezon after Aurora's death in 1951.
^6 On April 8, 1959, Republic Act No. 2141 was signed into law effectively making Biliran a sub-province of Leyte. The island was only made an independent province on May 11, 1992 by virtue of Republic Act No. 7160.
^7 Prior to 1969, Camiguin is a sub-province under the jurisdiction of Misamis Oriental. It became an independent province on June 18, 1966.
^8 The eastern part of Davao del Norte on January 30, 1998 as the province of Compostela Valley by virtue of Republic Act No. 8470.
^9 The present-day Davao Region used to be a whole province simply known as Davao. This original province was split into three: Davao del Norte, Davao Oriental, and Davao del Sur when Republic Act No. 4867.
^10 The province of Dinagat Islands had been a part of the First District of Surigao del Norte until becoming a province on its own on December 2, 2006. On February 11, 2010, the Supreme Court of the Philippines declared the creation of Dinagat Islands null and void on grounds of failure to meet land area and population requirements for the creation of local government units. Dinagat Islands then reverted to Surigao del Norte. On March 30, 2011, however, the Supreme Court reversed its ruling from the previous year, and upheld the constitutionality of RA 9355 and the creation of Dinagat Islands as a province.
^11 On June 19, 1965 the Philippine Congress approved Republic Act No. 4221 dividing the province of Samar into three provinces: Northern Samar, Eastern Samar, and Western Samar. On June 21, 1969, Western Samar was renamed Samar.
^12 Guimaras first gained its status as a sub-province of Iloilo by virtue of R.A. 4667, which was enacted by Congress on 18 June 1966. It was proclaimed as a regular and full-fledged province on 22 May 1992 after a plebiscite was conducted to ratify the approval of its conversion.
^13 The province of Lanao was divided into Lanao del Norte and Lanao del Sur through Republic Act No. 2228 on May 22, 1959.
^14 The former province of Cotabato was once the largest in the Philippines. In 1966, South Cotabato was created as a separate province. On November 22, 1973, by virtue of Presidential Decree No. 341, what remained of the old Cotabato was further divided into the provinces of North Cotabato, Maguindanao, and Sultan Kudarat. North Cotabato was later renamed Cotabato through Batas Pambansa Blg. 660[3] approved on December 19, 1983.
^15 Prior to 1981, only includes results from the City of Manila. Metro Manila was created in 1975, prior to that almost all of Manila was a part of Rizal, with Valenzuela a part of Bulacan, with the city of Manila independent.
^16 Quirino province acquired its juridical personality as a result of the division of the provinces of Nueva Vizcaya and Isabela on June 18, 1966 under RA 4734. Quirino, named after the late president Elpidio Quirino, was created as a sub-province of Nueva Vizcaya in 1966. It became a full province in 1971.
^17 The province of Davao Occidental was created from the comprising five of the eight municipalities that constitute the 2nd district of Davao del Sur by the virtue of RA No. 10360 was signed by President Benigno Aquino III on January 14, 2013. Following the passage of the said charter province, a plebiscite was held on October 28, 2013, coinciding with the Barangay elections were held on the said date; and the majority of the votes cast by votes were "Yes", ratifying the province, while "No" is the very few number of voters' cast, about on opposing the said creation.
