= 1949 Philippine general election =

- November 8, 1949
- Presidential election
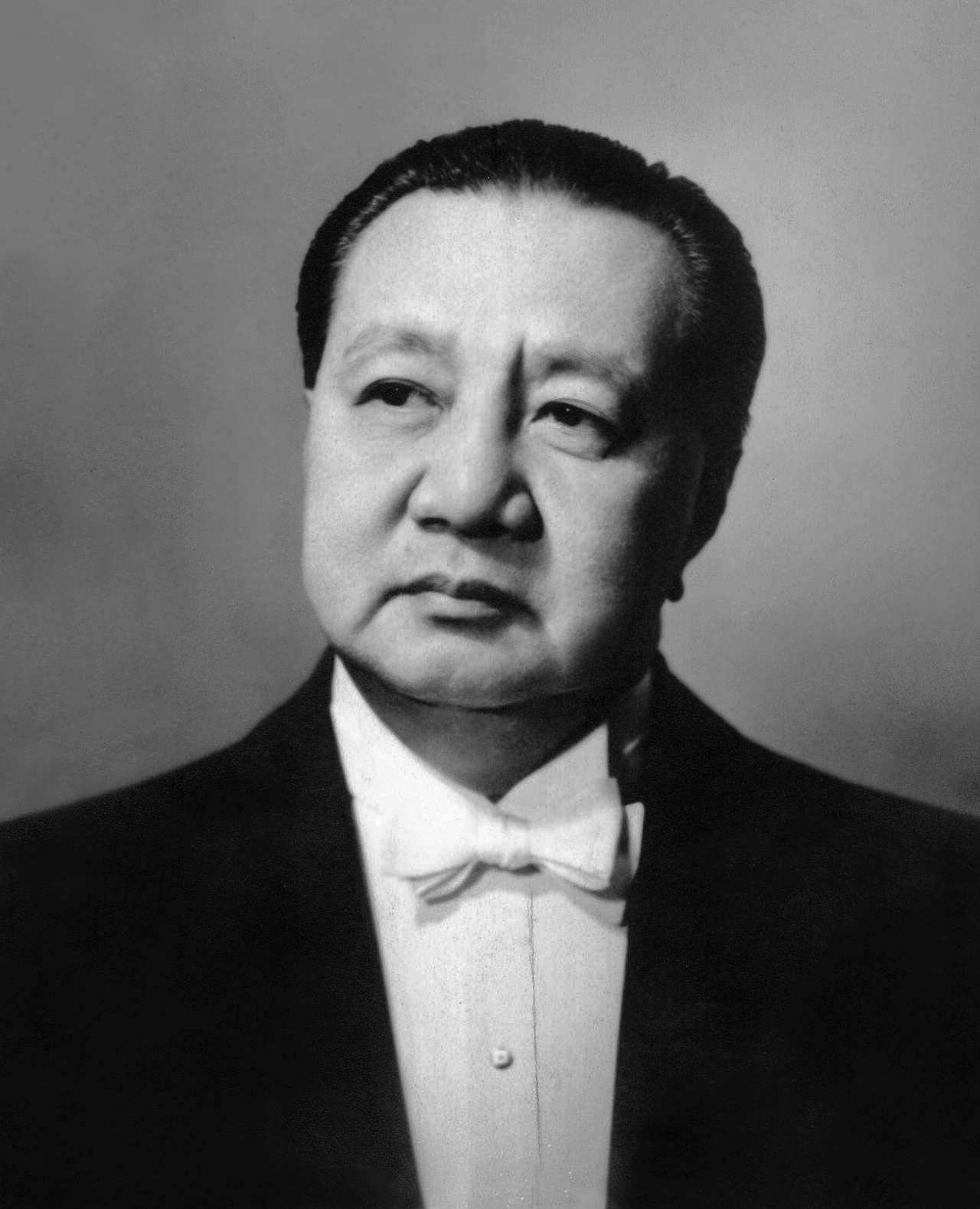

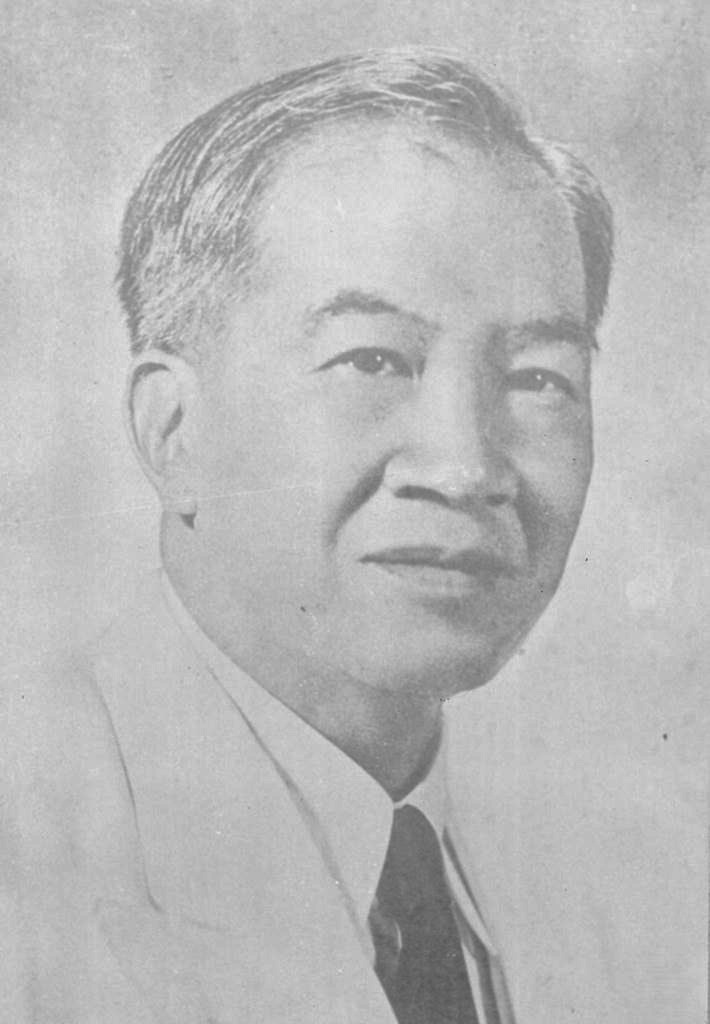

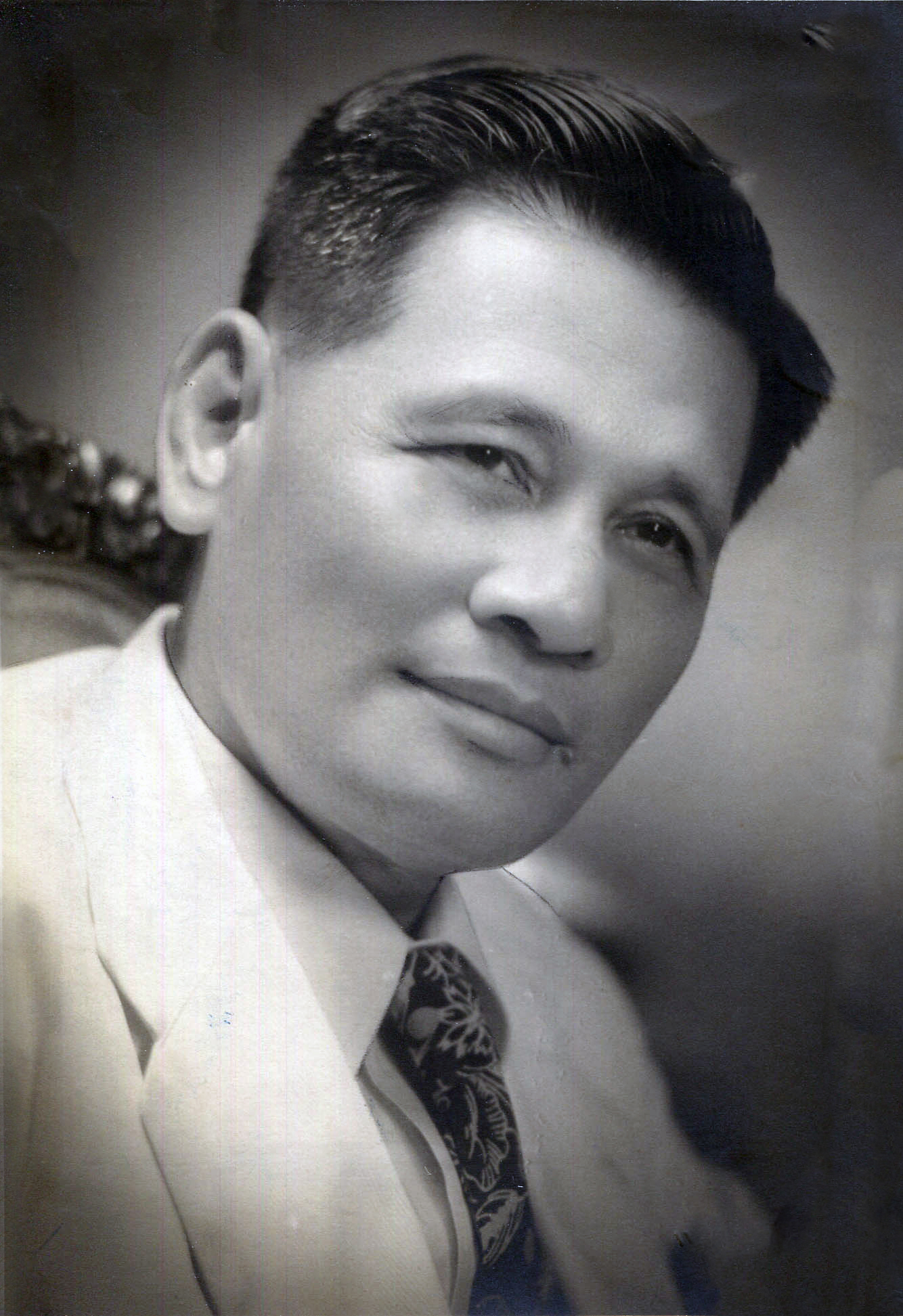
Candidate	Elpidio Quirino	José P. Laurel	José Avelino
Party	Liberal	Nacionalista	Liberal
Alliance	Quirinita		Avelinista
Running mate	Fernando Lopez	Manuel Briones	Vicente Francisco
Popular vote	1,803,808	1,318,330	419,890
Percentage	50.93%	37.22%	11.85%
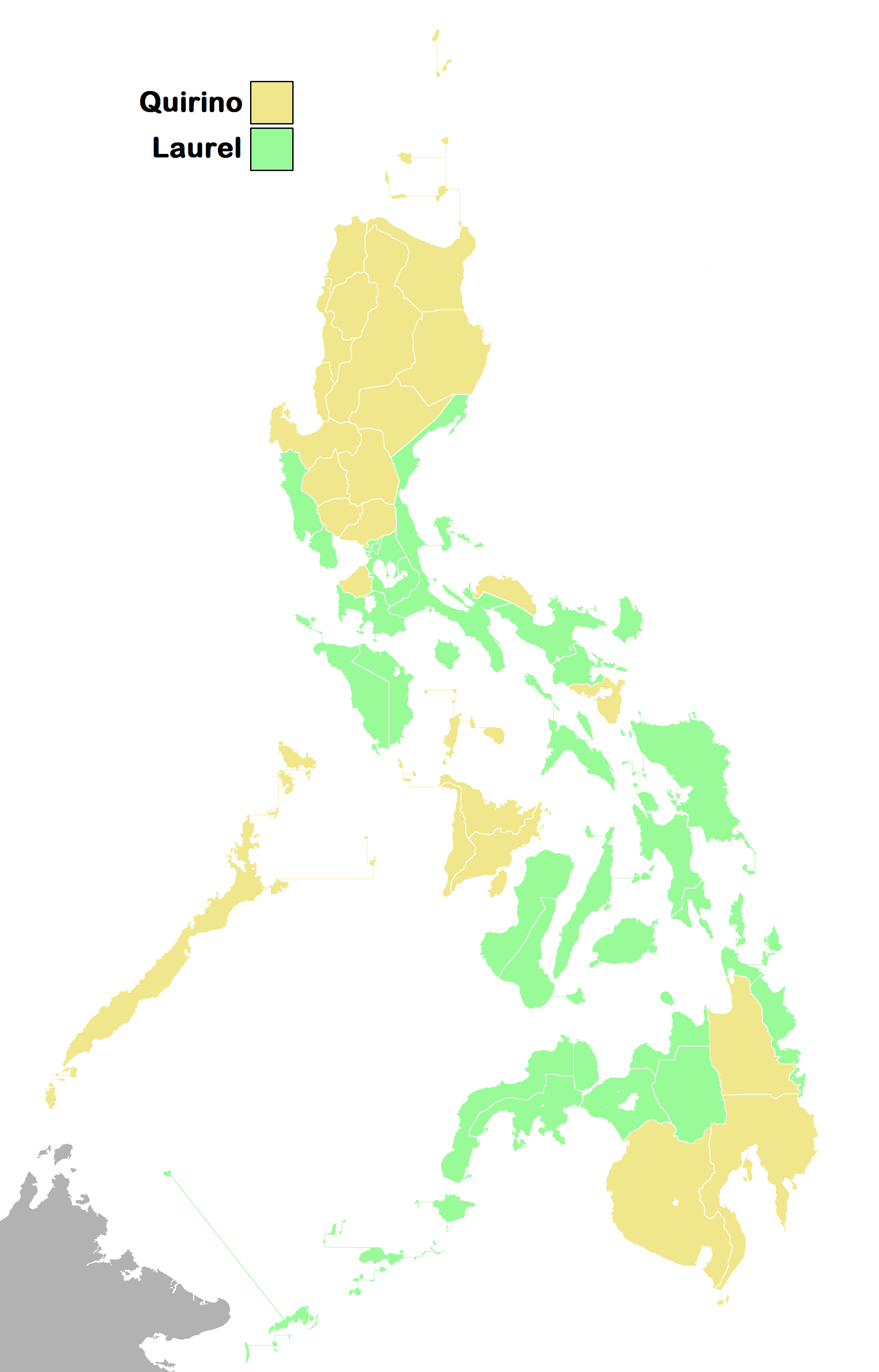
President before election
Elpidio Quirino
Liberal
Elected President
Elpidio Quirino
Liberal
- Vice presidential election
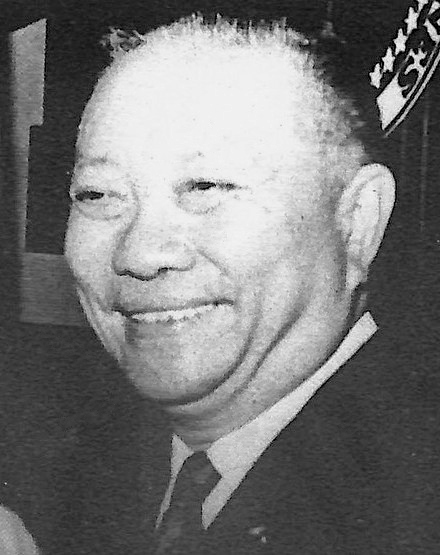

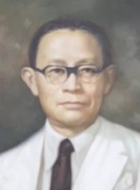

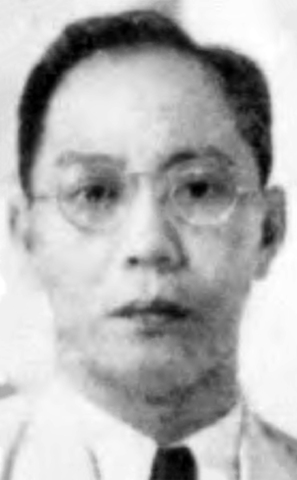
Candidate	Fernando Lopez	Manuel Briones	Vicente Francisco
Party	Liberal	Nacionalista	Liberal
Popular vote	1,741,302	1,184,215	444,550
Percentage	51.67%	35.14	13.19%
Vice President before election
Vacant
Elected Vice President
Fernando Lopez
Liberal
- Senate election

8 of the 24 seats in the Philippine Senate 13 needs for a majority
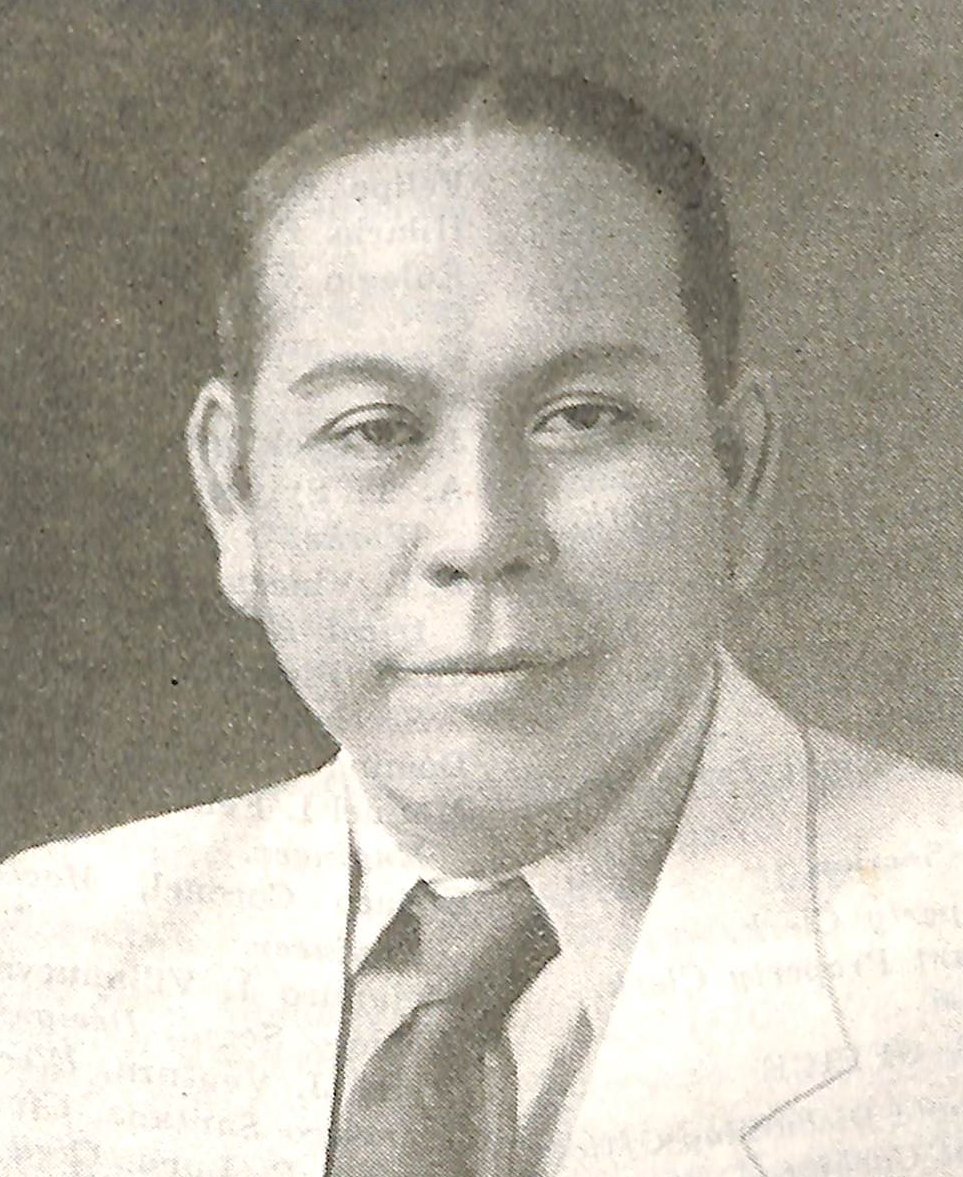

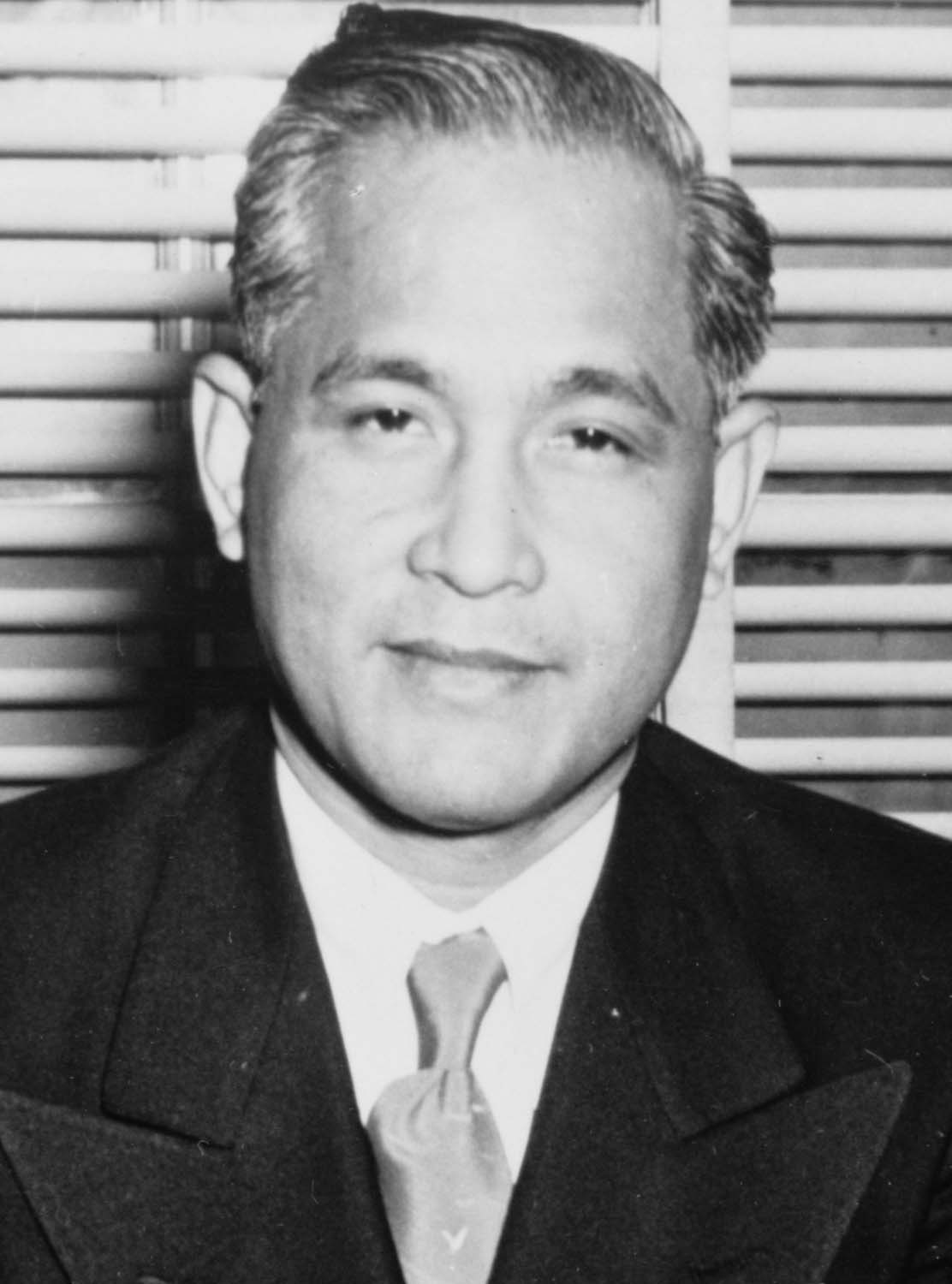
	First party	Second party
Leader	Mariano Jesús Cuenco	Carlos P. Garcia
Party	Liberal	Nacionalista
Seats before	12 (2 up)	8 (4 up)
Seats won	8	0
Seats after	17	4
Seat change	▲5	▼4
Popular vote	12,782,449	8,900,568
Percentage	52.52	36.57
Swing	▼2.20	▼8.47
Senate President before election
Mariano Jesús Cuenco
Liberal
Elected Senate President
Mariano Jesús Cuenco
Liberal
- House elections

All 100 seats in the House of Representatives of the Philippines 51 seats needed for a majority
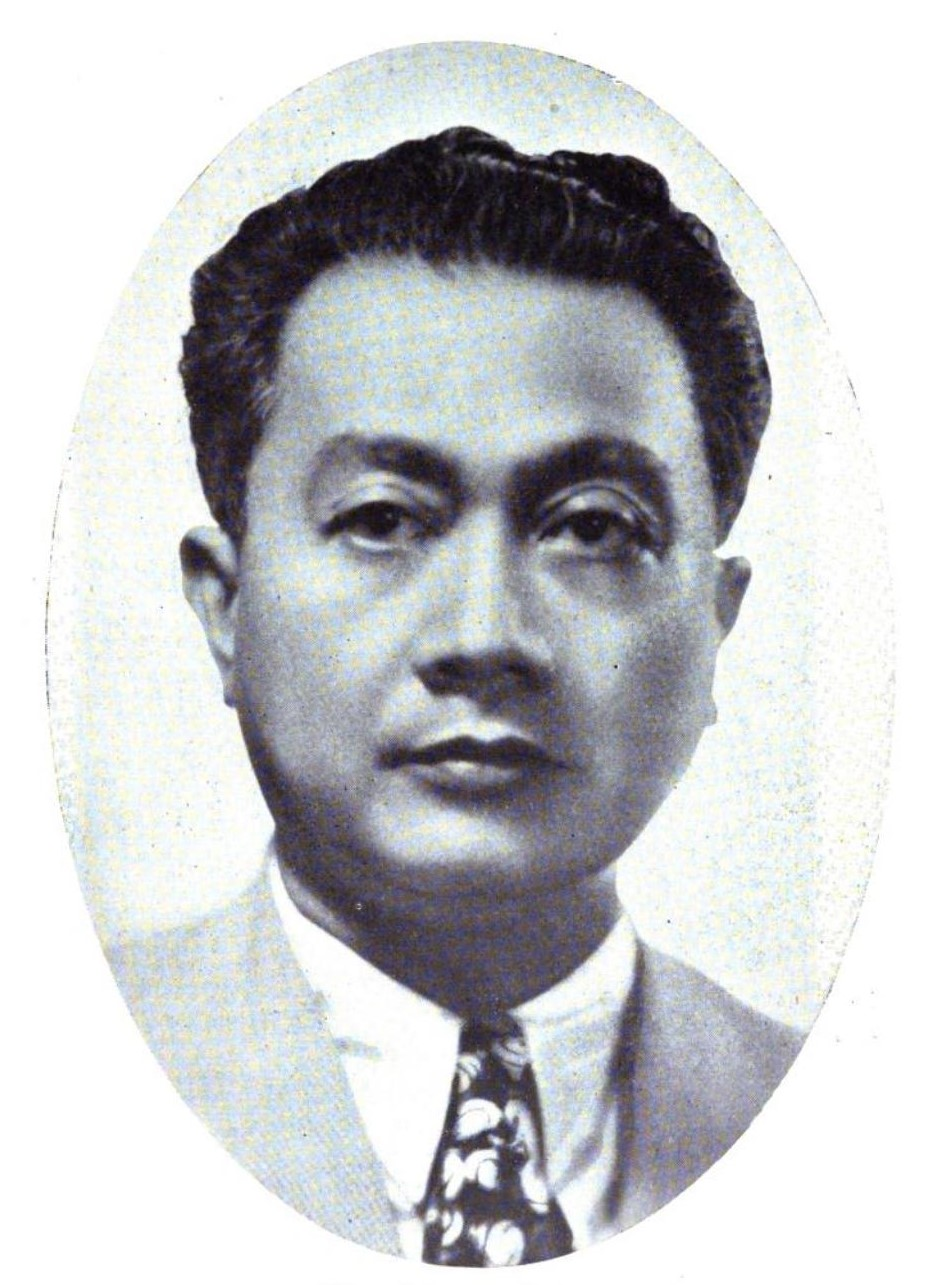

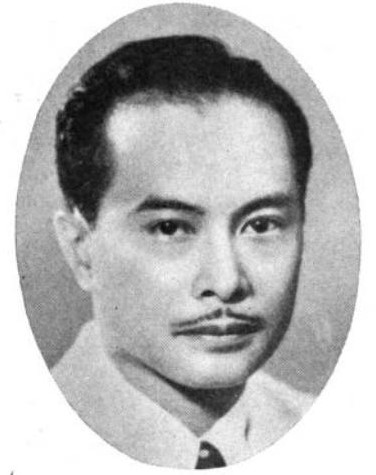

	First party	Second party	Third party
Leader	Eugenio Pérez	Jose Laurel Jr.
Party	Liberal	Nacionalista	Liberal (Avelino wing)
Leader's seat	Pangasinan–2nd	Batangas–3rd
Last election	49 seats, 38.89%	35 seats, 45.78%	New party
Seats won	66	33	6
Seat change	▲11	▼2	▲6
Popular vote	1,834,173	1,178,402	385,188
Percentage	53.00	34.05	11.13
Swing	▲14.11	▼11.73	▲11.13
Speaker before election
Eugenio Pérez
Liberal
Elected Speaker
Eugenio Pérez
Liberal

Presidential, legislative, and local elections were held in the Philippines on November 8, 1949. Incumbent President Elpidio Quirino won a full term as President of the Philippines after the death of late President Manuel Roxas in 1948. His running mate, Senator Fernando Lopez won as Vice President. Despite factions created in the administration party, Quirino won a satisfactory vote from the public. It was the only time in Philippine history where the duly elected president, vice president and senators all came from the same party, the Liberal Party.

== Results ==
=== President ===
Candidate	Party	Votes	%
Elpidio Quirino (incumbent)	Liberal Party (Quirino wing) (Note: The Liberal Party was split into two wings: those who supported Quirino or the "Quirinitas" or the "Quirino wing", and those who supported Avelino or the "Avelinistas" or the "Avelino wing".)	1,803,808	50.93
Jose P. Laurel	Nacionalista Party	1,318,320	37.22
José Avelino	Liberal Party (Avelino wing)	419,890	11.85
Total		3,542,018	100.00
Valid votes		3,542,018	98.94
Invalid/blank votes		37,899	1.06
Total votes		3,579,917	100.00
Registered voters/turnout		5,135,814	69.70
Source: Nohlen, Grotz, Hartmann, Hasall and Santos

=== Vice president ===
Candidate	Party	Votes	%
Fernando Lopez	Liberal Party (Quirino wing) (Note: The Liberal Party was split into two wings: those who supported Elpidio Quirino or the "Quirinitas" or the "Quirino wing", and those who supported Jose Avelino or the "Avelinistas" or the "Avelino wing".)	1,741,302	51.67
Manuel Briones	Nacionalista Party	1,184,215	35.14
Vicente Francisco	Liberal Party (Avelino wing)	444,550	13.19
Total		3,370,067	100.00
Valid votes		3,370,067	94.14
Invalid/blank votes		209,850	5.86
Total votes		3,579,917	100.00
Registered voters/turnout		5,135,814	69.70
Source: Nohlen, Grotz, Hartmann, Hasall and Santos

=== Senate ===
Representation of results; seats contested are inside the box. Liberal Party Nacionalista Party Popular Front Vacancy

Candidate	Party	Votes	%
Quintin Paredes	Liberal Party (Quirino wing) (Note: The Liberal Party was split into two wings: those who supported Elpidio Quirino or the "Quirinitas" or the "Quirino wing", and those who supported José Avelino or the "Avelinistas" or the "Avelino wing".)	1,756,898	49.08
Esteban Abada	Liberal Party (Quirino wing)	1,685,520	47.08
Lorenzo Sumulong	Liberal Party (Quirino wing)	1,615,124	45.12
Enrique Magalona	Liberal Party (Quirino wing)	1,577,083	44.05
Tomas Cabili	Liberal Party (Quirino wing)	1,575,075	44.00
Macario Peralta Jr.	Liberal Party (Quirino wing)	1,566,376	43.75
Justiniano Montano	Liberal Party (Quirino wing)	1,515,569	42.34
Teodoro de Vera (Note: Teodoro de Vera was later removed from office in favor of Claro M. Recto who won an election protest.)	Liberal Party (Quirino wing)	1,486,158	41.51
Claro M. Recto	Nacionalista Party	1,390,528	38.84
Alejo Mabanag	Nacionalista Party	1,150,818	32.15
Trinidad Legarda	Nacionalista Party	1,108,732	30.97
Jose O. Vera	Nacionalista Party	1,101,996	30.78
Jose Maria Veloso	Nacionalista Party	1,069,817	29.88
Marcelo Adduru	Nacionalista Party	1,053,754	29.44
Pedro Hernaez	Nacionalista Party	1,025,342	28.64
Domocao Alonto	Nacionalista Party	999,581	27.92
Jose T. Nueno	Liberal Party (Avelino wing)	391,394	10.93
Salipada Pendatun	Liberal Party (Avelino wing)	374,340	10.46
Olegario Clarin	Liberal Party (Avelino wing)	346,921	9.69
Filemon Sotto	Liberal Party (Avelino wing)	343,823	9.60
Felicidad Manuel	Liberal Party (Avelino wing)	340,781	9.52
Aurelio Intertas	Liberal Party (Avelino wing)	293,630	8.20
Jose Tando	Liberal Party (Avelino wing)	291,550	8.14
Apolonio Curato	Liberal Party (Avelino wing)	267,073	7.46
Leonardo Tenebro	Independent	4,592	0.13
Cesar Bulacan	Independent	1,531	0.04
Total		24,334,006	100.00
Total votes		3,579,917	–
Registered voters/turnout		5,135,814	69.70

=== House of Representatives ===
Party	Votes	%	+/–	Seats	+/–
Liberal Party (Quirino wing) (Note: The Liberal Party was split into two wings: those who supported Quirino or the "Quirinitas" or the "Quirino wing", and those who supported Avelino or the "Avelinistas" or the "Avelino wing".)	1,834,173	53.00	+14.11	60	+11
Nacionalista Party	1,178,402	34.05	−11.73	33	−2
Liberal Party (Avelino wing)	385,188	11.13	New	6	New
Citizens' Party	6,434	0.19	New	0	0
Democratic Party	3,760	0.11	New	0	0
People's Party	3,423	0.10	New	0	0
Collectivista Party	193	0.01	New	0	0
Christian Democrats	52	0.00	New	0	0
Independent	49,265	1.42	−2.34	1	−4
Total	3,460,890	100.00	–	100	+2
Valid votes	3,460,890	96.68	+5.74		
Invalid/blank votes	119,027	3.32	−5.74		
Total votes	3,579,917	100.00	–		
Registered voters/turnout	5,135,814	69.70	−18.96		
Source: Nohlen, Grotz and Hartmann and Teehankee

== See also ==
- Commission on Elections
- Politics of the Philippines
- Philippine elections
- President of the Philippines
- 2nd Congress of the Philippines
