= Coritha =

Filipino folk singer (1951–2024)

- Born: Socorro Avelino; June 27, 1951
- Died: September 27, 2024 (aged 73) Tagaytay, Cavite, Philippines
- Genres: Folk; Country
- Occupations: Singer; composer; songwriter
- Years active: 1960s–2017
- Partner: Chito Santos

Socorro Avelino (June 27, 1951 – September 27, 2024), commonly known professionally by the mononym Coritha, was a Filipino folk singer. She is best known for the 1979 song "Oras Na", and other songs such as "Sierra Madre" and "Lolo Jose".

== Career ==
Coritha popularized the songs "Oras Na" (lit. 'It's Time') and "Sierra Madre" in the 1970s. She also performed "Awit Kay Leandro" (lit. 'Song for Leandro'), "Gising na, O Kuya Ko" (lit. 'Wake Up, My Older Brother') and "Lolo Jose" (lit. 'Grandpa Jose'). Peaking in the 1960s and 1970s, she is noted for her folk-country songs which devises native Philippine instruments.

"Lolo Jose" was an own composition which was an entry at the Metro Pop Songwriting Contest. She is also a recipient of two Cecil awards for Best Folk-Pop Song and Best Folk-Pop Vocal Performance.

Coritha retired from full-time performing in 2000. She also composed the song "Mabuhay Ang Kalayaan" (lit. 'Long live Freedom'), which was used as the theme song of the 2002 film Lapu-Lapu and was nominated as Best Theme Song in the 2002 Metro Manila Film Festival.

The song "Oras Na" was used a protest anthem in the 2001 EDSA Revolution which deposed president Joseph Estrada. Coritha personally took part in the protests. The song composed in 1978 and released a year later was made during the Martial law era under president and dictator, Ferdinand Marcos. The song, particularly the line Ang takot ay nasa isip lamang (lit. 'Fear is only in the mind') was also referenced by Corazon Aquino in a rally against Marcos in 1986. It was also used as a theme for the 2018 film BuyBust.

== Illness and death ==
Coritha was diabetic and became bedridden in her final years of her life after suffering from a stroke in February 2024. Coritha died on September 27, 2024, at her partner's residence in Tagaytay. Her condition was first publicized in July 2024 by her partner through a video by Julius Babao's vlog channel in YouTube, with Coritha's colleagues in the industry organizing a fundraiser for her. Coritha's remains were subsequently cremated.

== Personal life ==
Coritha's paternal grandfather was José Avelino, who served as president of the Philippine Senate. Avelino was the inspiration for her popular song "Lolo Jose".

Luisito "Chito" Santos was Coritha's domestic partner who found her after Coritha's house in Quezon City burned down in 2018. She first met Santos in the 1980s during a concert in Escolta. Following the fire, she lived in Santos's residence in Tagaytay in Cavite until her death. She also had a sister and a brother.
