= Vicente Francisco =

Filipino jurist and politician

Vicente J. Francisco
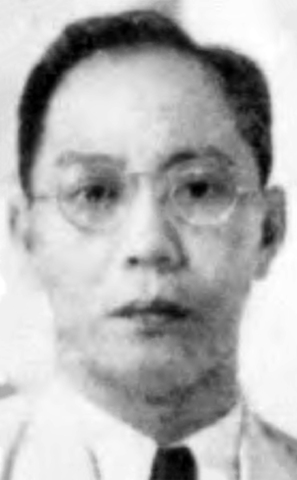

Senator of the Philippines
- In office May 25, 1946 – December 30, 1951

Senate Majority Leader
- In office May 25, 1946 – February 21, 1949
- Preceded by: Melecio Arranz
- Succeeded by: Tomas Cabili

Personal details
- Born: July 19, 1890 Cavite Puerto, Cavite, Captaincy General of the Philippines
- Died: May 8, 1974 (aged 83)
- Resting place: Loyola Memorial Park, Marikina, Philippines
- Party: Liberal (1946–1974)
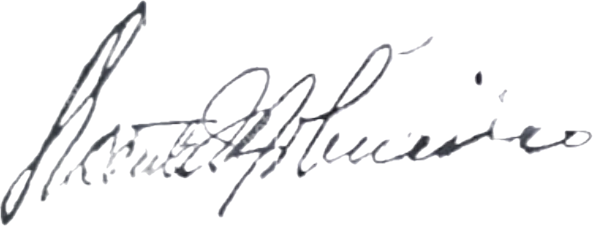
- Signature

Vicente J. Francisco y Santos (July 19, 1890 – May 8, 1974) was a Filipino jurist and politician. Known as one of the best Filipino lawyers of his time, he was part of the 1934 Constitutional Convention, and served in the Senate of the Philippines from 1946 to 1949.

== Early life and education ==
Francisco was born on July 19, 1890 to Bibiano Francisco and Josefa Santos in Cavite, Cavite. He studied at Escuela de Derecho de Manila where he obtained his Bachelor of Laws in 1914. He then went to New York, United States and enrolled at Columbia University to study mercantile law.

== Legal career ==
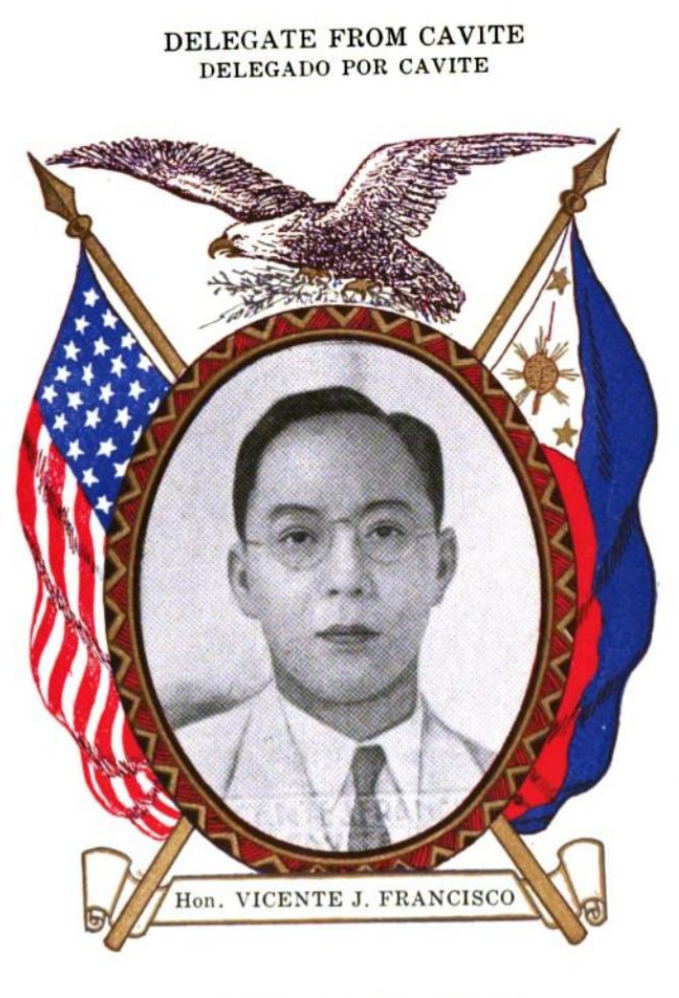
Francisco as a delegate to the Philippine Constitutional Convention, published by Benipayo Press (c. 1935)

As a lawyer, he worked as the Dean of the College of Law at the University of Manila and was president of the Lawyer's League of the Philippines.

He was elected as a delegate from Cavite in the 1934 Philippine Constitutional Convention election. Aside from politics, Francisco also owned and became president of East Publishing Company, Inc. He was a prolific writer and published his own law books.

== Political career ==
In 1946, Francisco was elected to the Senate of the Philippines as a candidate of the Liberal Party, winning the largest number of votes. After his election, he was elected Majority Leader by his colleagues. In the Senate, he filed many bills including Act 52, which re-established the Court of Appeals.

In the 1949 elections, Francisco ran for Vice President of the Philippines as running mate of Senate President Jose Avelino, but lost to Fernando Lopez with 1.73% of the vote.

== Personal life and death ==
Francisco died in 1974. He was married to María Jalbuena; their son Ricardo Francisco served as a justice in the Court of Appeals and later of the Supreme Court.

== Gallery ==
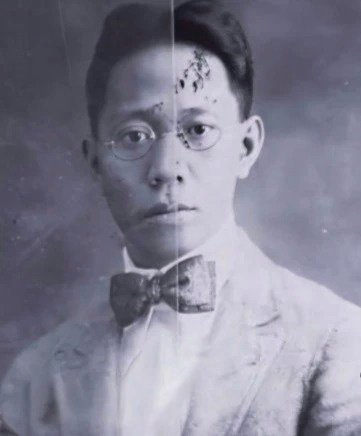
Francisco's U.S. passport application picture, 1920

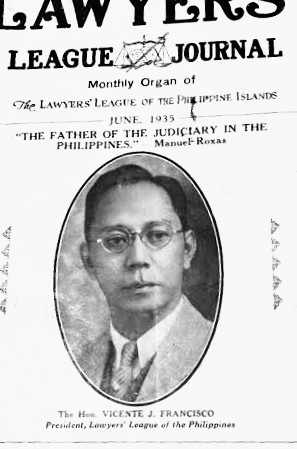
Francisco depicted from the Lawyer's League Journal, dated June 1935

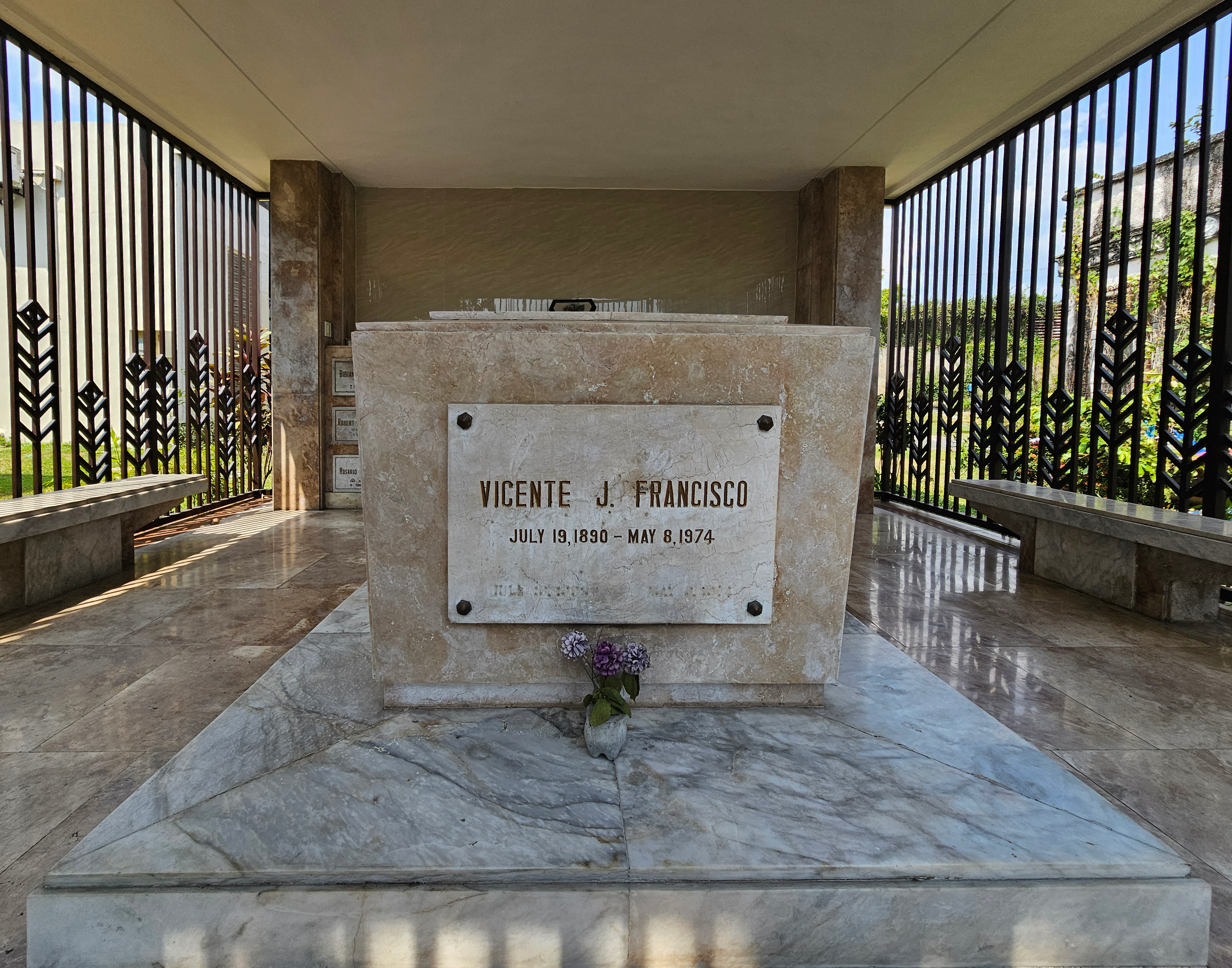
Tomb of Francisco
