= 1949 Philippine presidential election =

4th election of Philippine president

- November 8, 1949
- Turnout: 69.70 (▼19.89pp)
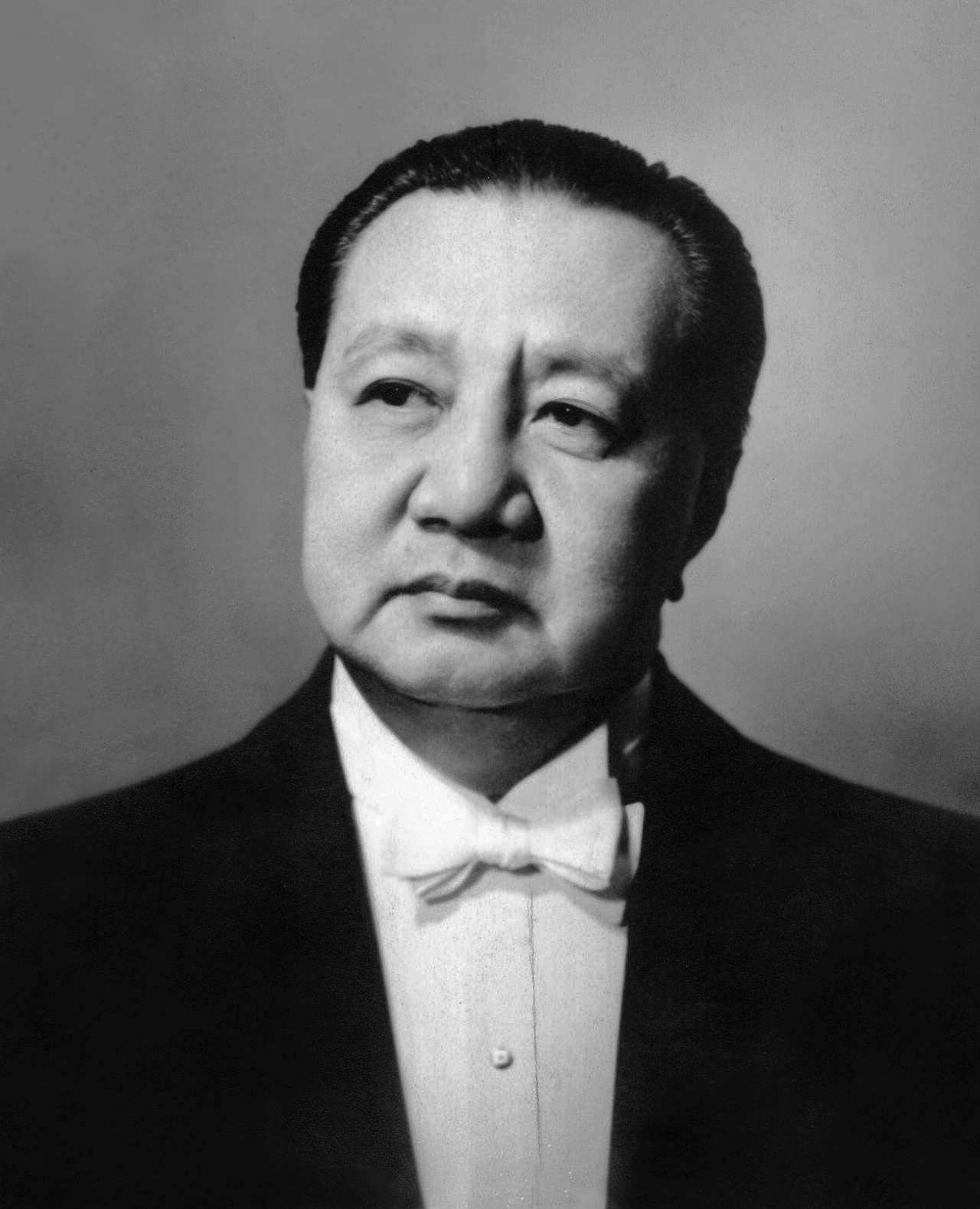

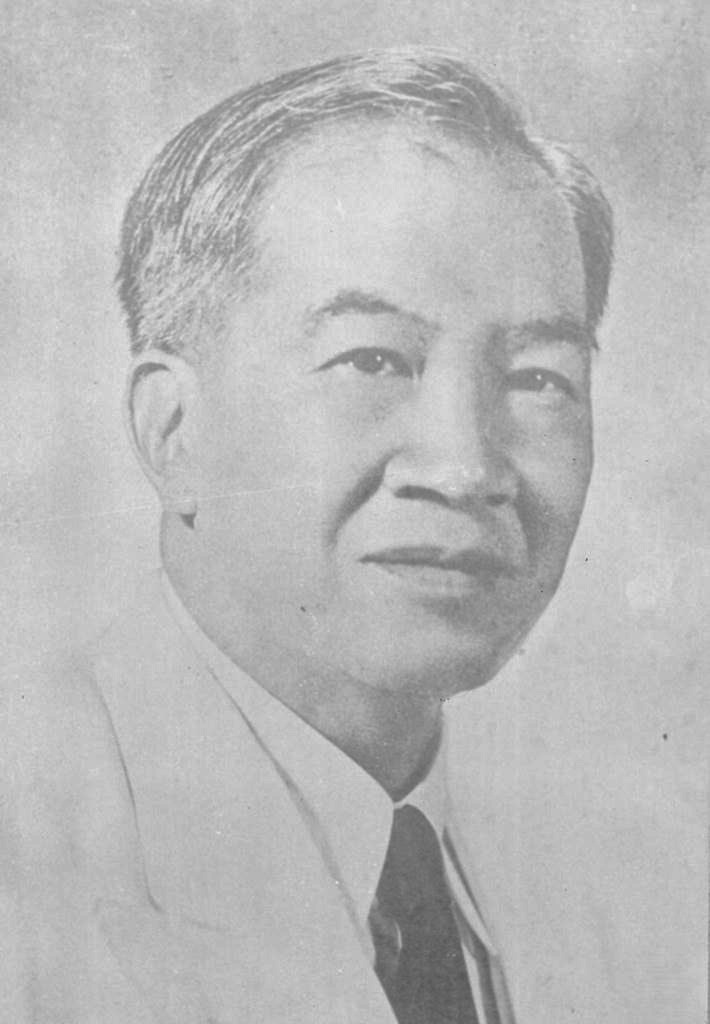

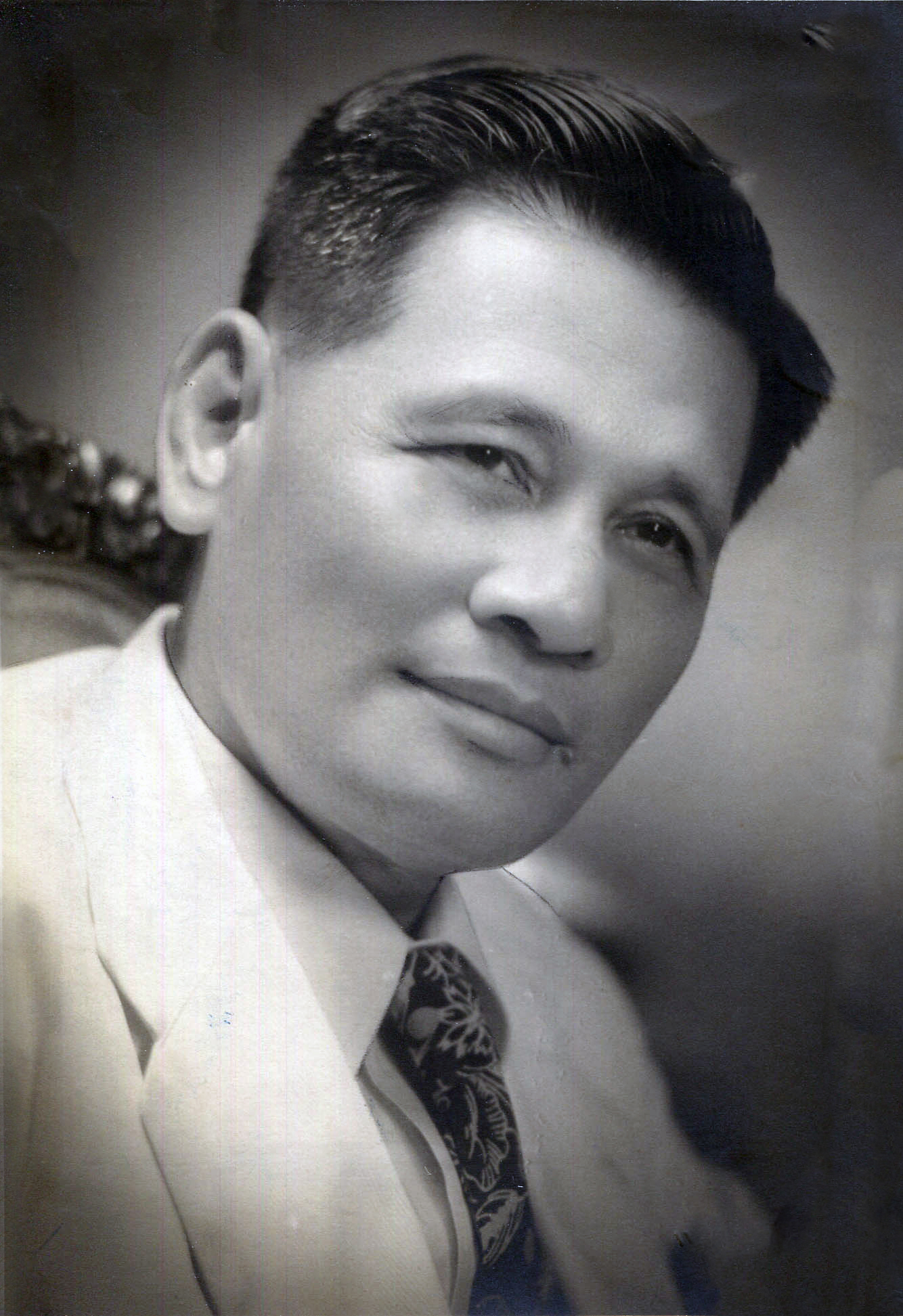
| Candidate | Elpidio Quirino | José P. Laurel | José Avelino |
| Party | Liberal | Nacionalista | Liberal |
| Alliance | Quirinita | | Avelinista |
| Running mate | Fernando Lopez | Manuel Briones | Vicente Francisco |
| Popular vote | 1,803,808 | 1,318,330 | 419,890 |
| Percentage | 50.93% | 37.22% | 11.85% |
President before election
Elpidio Quirino
Liberal
Elected President
Elpidio Quirino
Liberal
- 1949 Philippine vice presidential election
- November 8, 1949
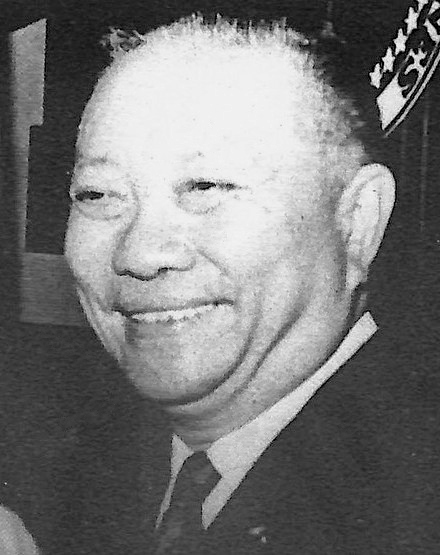

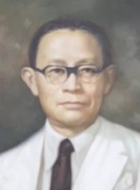

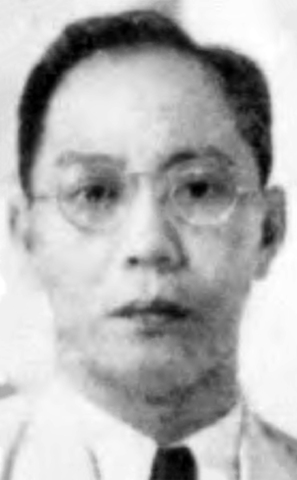
| Candidate | Fernando Lopez | Manuel Briones | Vicente Francisco |
| Party | Liberal | Nacionalista | Liberal |
| Popular vote | 1,741,302 | 1,184,215 | 444,550 |
| Percentage | 51.67% | 35.14 | 13.19% |
Vice President before election
Vacant (Elpidio Quirino in previous election)
Elected Vice President
Fernando Lopez
Liberal

Presidential and vice presidential elections were held in the Philippines on November 8, 1949. Incumbent President Elpidio Quirino won a full term as President of the Philippines after the death of President Manuel Roxas in 1948. His running mate, Senator Fernando Lopez, won as Vice President. Despite factions created in the administration party, Quirino won a satisfactory vote from the public. It was the only time in Philippine history where the duly elected president, vice president and senators all came from the same party, the Liberal Party.

Fraud and violence was prevalent during the election. Carlos P. Romulo and Marvin M. Gray, publisher of the Manila Evening News, accuse Quirino in their book The Magsaysay Story of widespread fraud and intimidation of the opposition by military action, calling it the "dirty election".

== Criticism of the election ==
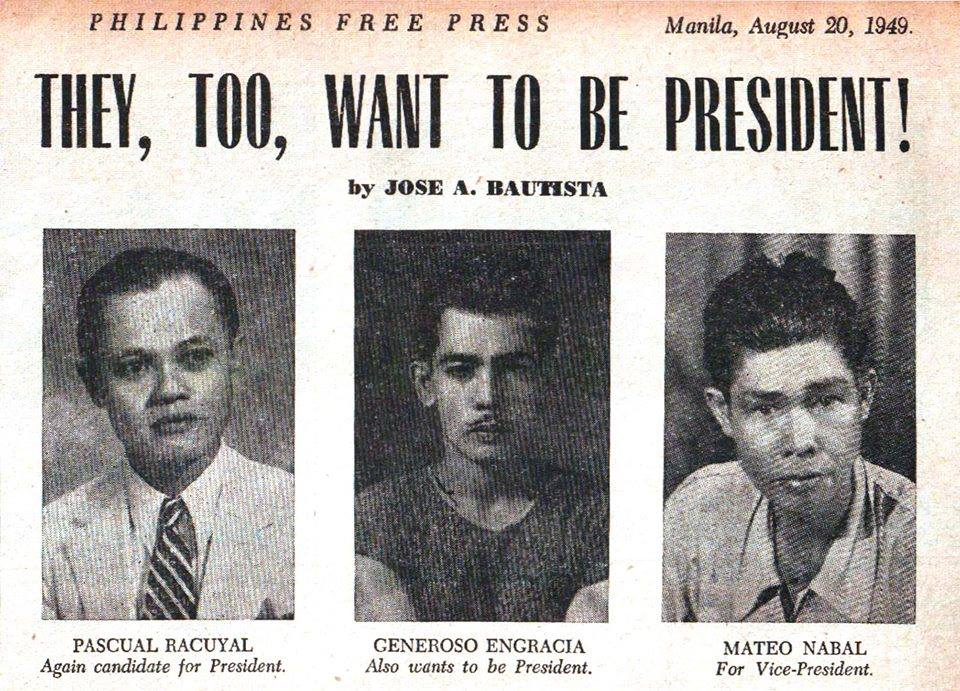

The election was widely criticized as being corrupt, with violence and fraud taking place. Opponents of Quirino were either beaten up or murdered by his supporters or the police, and the election continues to be perceived as corrupt.

== Results ==
=== President ===
| Candidate | Party | Votes | % |
|---|---|---|---|
| Elpidio Quirino (incumbent) | Liberal Party (Quirino wing) (Note: The Liberal Party was split into two wings: those who supported Quirino or the "Quirinitas" or the "Quirino wing", and those who supported Avelino or the "Avelinistas" or the "Avelino wing".) | 1,803,808 | 50.93 |
| Jose P. Laurel | Nacionalista Party | 1,318,320 | 37.22 |
| José Avelino | Liberal Party (Avelino wing) | 419,890 | 11.85 |
| Total | | 3,542,018 | 100.00 |
| Valid votes | | 3,542,018 | 98.94 |
| Invalid/blank votes | | 37,899 | 1.06 |
| Total votes | | 3,579,917 | 100.00 |
| Registered voters/turnout | | 5,135,814 | 69.70 |
Source: Nohlen, Grotz, Hartmann, Hasall and Santos

Popular vote
| Quirino | 50.93% |
| Laurel | 37.22% |
| Avelino | 11.85% |

=== Vice-President ===
| Candidate | Party | Votes | % |
|---|---|---|---|
| Fernando Lopez | Liberal Party (Quirino wing) (Note: The Liberal Party was split into two wings: those who supported Elpidio Quirino or the "Quirinitas" or the "Quirino wing", and those who supported Jose Avelino or the "Avelinistas" or the "Avelino wing".) | 1,741,302 | 51.67 |
| Manuel Briones | Nacionalista Party | 1,184,215 | 35.14 |
| Vicente Francisco | Liberal Party (Avelino wing) | 444,550 | 13.19 |
| Total | | 3,370,067 | 100.00 |
| Valid votes | | 3,370,067 | 94.14 |
| Invalid/blank votes | | 209,850 | 5.86 |
| Total votes | | 3,579,917 | 100.00 |
| Registered voters/turnout | | 5,135,814 | 69.70 |
Source: Nohlen, Grotz, Hartmann, Hasall and Santos

Popular vote
| Lopez | 51.67% |
| Briones | 35.14% |
| Francisco | 13.19% |

== See also ==
- Commission on Elections
- Politics of the Philippines
- Philippine elections
- President of the Philippines
- 2nd Congress of the Philippines
