= José Avelino =

President of the Senate of the Philippines from 1946 to 1949

The Honourable José Avelino
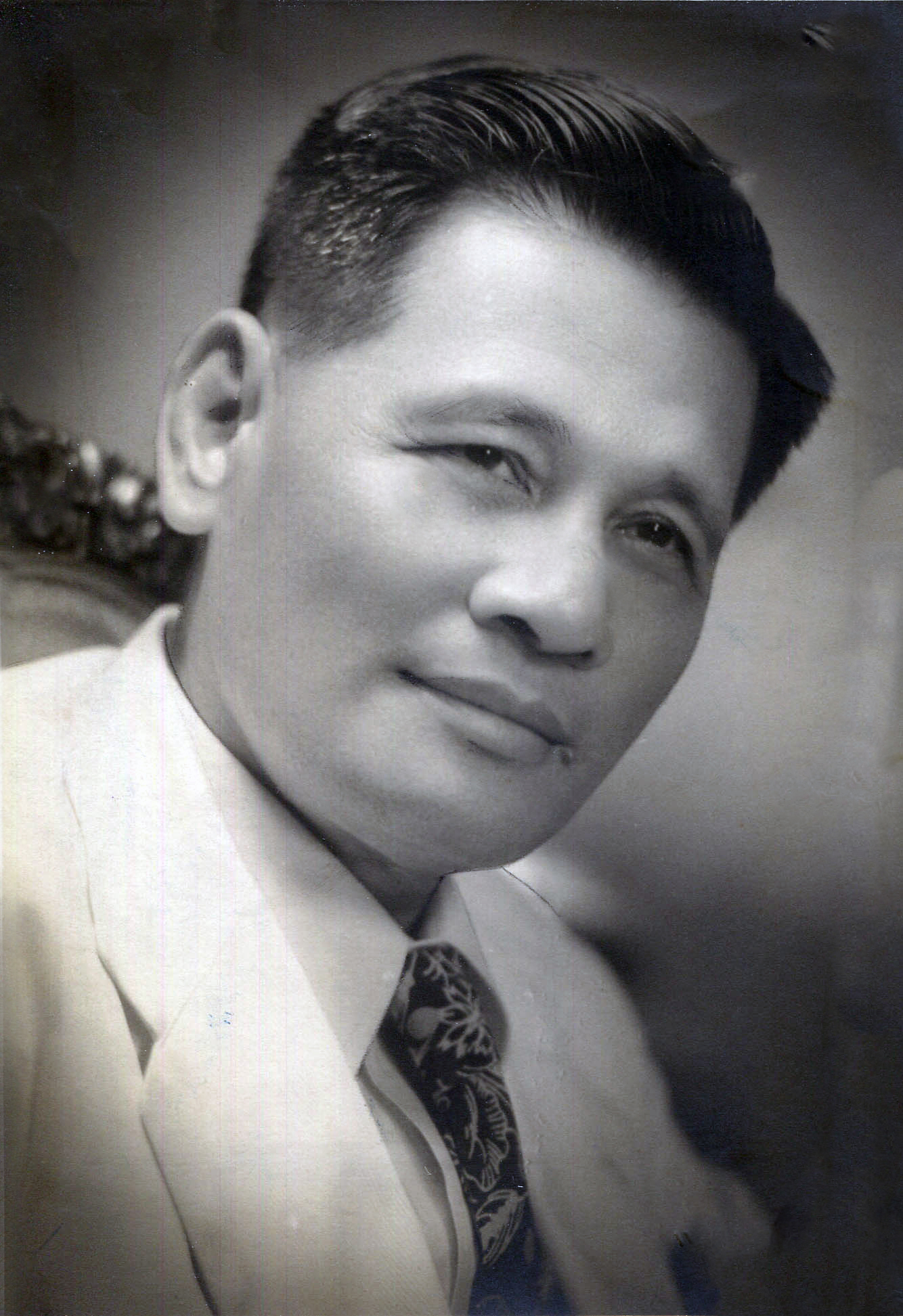

3rd President of the Senate of the Philippines
- In office May 28, 1946 – February 21, 1949
- Preceded by: Manuel Roxas
- Succeeded by: Mariano Cuenco

President pro tempore of the Senate of the Philippines
- In office June 2, 1935 – November 15, 1935
- Preceded by: José Clarín
- Succeeded by: Senate abolished (Next held by Elpidio Quirino)

Senator of the Philippines
- In office May 25, 1946 – December 30, 1951
- In office June 5, 1928 – November 15, 1935
- Preceded by: Pastor Salazar
- Succeeded by: District abolished
- Constituency: 9th senatorial district

Secretary of Public Works and Communications
- In office 1939 – 1941
- President: Manuel L. Quezon
- Preceded by: Mariano Jesús Cuenco
- Succeeded by: Sotero Baluyut

Secretary of Labor
- In office 1937–1939
- President: Manuel L. Quezon
- Preceded by: Ramon Torres
- Succeeded by: Leon Guinto

Member of the House of Representatives from Samar's 1st district
- In office June 6, 1922 – June 5, 1928
- Preceded by: Pedro Mendiola
- Succeeded by: Tiburcio Tancinco

2nd President of the Liberal Party
- In office April 19, 1948 – May 8, 1949
- Preceded by: Manuel Roxas
- Succeeded by: Elpidio Quirino

Personal details
- Born: José Avelino y Dira; August 5, 1890 Calbayog, Samar, Captaincy General of the Philippines
- Died: July 21, 1986 (aged 95) Manila, Philippines
- Resting place: Loyola Memorial Park Marikina, Philippines
- Party: Liberal (1946–1986)
- Other political affiliations: Nacionalista (1928–1946); Democrata (1922–1928)
- Spouse: Enriqueta Casal
- Children: 5
- Relatives: Coritha (granddaughter); Paulo Avelino (great-grandson)
- Education: Ateneo de Manila (AB); University of Santo Tomas (LL.B)

José Dira Avelino Sr. (August 5, 1890 – July 21, 1986) was the first president of the Senate of the Third Republic of the Philippines and the second president of the Liberal Party. Born in Calbayog, Avelino started as a municipal councilor of the city and served as a representative of Samar from 1922 to 1928. He earned a law degree and was admitted to the Philippine Bar in 1934. He served as Secretary of Labor and later as Secretary of Public Works and Communications in the late 1930s under President Manuel L. Quezon. He served as Senate President pro tempore to President Quezon prior to the establishment of the Commonwealth and was eventually elected as the president of the Senate in 1946. He unsuccessfully ran in the 1949 Philippine presidential election. Avelino died on July 21, 1986, at the age of 95.

== Early life and career ==
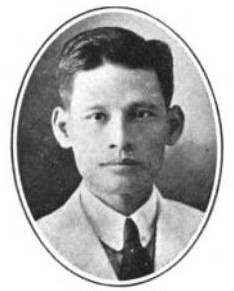
Avelino as member of the House of Representatives, c. 1923

Avelino was born in Calbayog, Samar, to Alfonsa Dira and Baltazar Avelino. Avelino was educated at the Ateneo de Manila, where he received his Bachelor of Arts degree, and the University of Santo Tomas, where he graduated with his Bachelor of Laws. He was admitted to the Philippine Bar in 1934 and was a municipal councilor for Calbayog for one term during 1917 to 1919. He served as a representative of Samar's 1st congressional district from 1922 until 1928.

== Secretary of Labor and Public Works and Highways ==
In 1935, Avelino went into private practice of his profession and became a senior member of Avelino & Yatco. In 1937, he returned to government service. He served as Secretary of Labor and later as Secretary of Public Works and Communications in the late 1930s under President Manuel L. Quezon. When he was the Secretary of Labor, Avelino unified the labor unions by organizing them into two commissions: the National Commission of Labor (NCL) and the National Commission of Peasants (NCP); he was designated chairman of these two commissions in 1938.

== Senate ==
He participated in the 8th Philippine Legislature from 1928 to 1931 representing the Philippines's 9th senatorial district of Leyte and Samar. He then participated in the 9th Philippine Legislature from 1931 to 1934. Avelino is known as the "father of the Philippine Workmen’s Compensation Law" which he authored during his term in Senate. The bill focused on creating a contingency insurance fund for workers as a way to protect them from economic problems. Avelino also founded the first labor union in Eastern Visayas, Gremio Obrero de Stevedores.

He was a part of the passage of the Social Security System and pushed for the establishment of public high schools in every province in the Philippines. From 1934 to 1935, he was the President pro tempore of the Senate of the Philippines in the 10th Philippine Legislature after the death of José Clarín. From 1946 to 1949 in the National Senate of the Philippines, he was elected as the president. Due to this, he became a popular politician in the Liberal Party next to President Manuel Roxas, contributing a large part in Roxas' 1946 campaign; he was "frustrated" with Elpidio Quirino's leadership. He became the president of the Liberal Party but was ousted shortly after due to a Senate investigation regarding alleged fraud.

== 1949 presidential election ==
Avelino ran for the Philippine presidency in the 1949 election, where he became third in a race between incumbent president Elpidio Quirino and former president José P. Laurel. In the Senate, Avelino was evenly divided with Quirino, but the latter still won with 50.93% of the votes. Avelino garnered 11.85% of the votes, and his vice-presidential mate, Vicente Francisco, garnered 13.19%.

=== "What are we in power for?" quote ===
Avelino was quoted as saying "What are we in power for?" during a party caucus in Malacañang. The whole statement was:

"Why did you have to order an investigation Honorable Mr. President? If you cannot permit abuses, you must at least tolerate them. What are we in power for? We are not hypocrites. Why should we pretend to be saints when in reality we are not? We are not angels. When we die, we will all go to hell. It is better to be in hell because in that place there are no investigations, no secretary of justice, no secretary of the interior to go after us."

The above account is disputed by historian Quintin Doroquez. Doroquez claims that Avelino was misquoted as "corrupt" by Celso Cabrera, a news reporter who did not speak Spanish. Doroquez also states that Congressman Faustino Tobia of Ilocos Norte confessed to the Avelino family later that the entire quote was fabricated and that the original context of Avelino's comment at the said party caucus on January 15, 1949, was about the Quirino administration dealing with the problems of the country. According to Doroquez, Congressman Tobia offered the following paraphrase as closer to what Avelino actually said in Spanish at the meeting, with the translation being: "Mr. President, is it not the truth that not addressing vigorously these problems is to betray and negate fundamentally our duties as public servants? What for is our mandate from the people?"

== Personal life ==
Avelino was married to Enriqueta Casal and had four sons. One of his grandchildren was the Filipino folk singer Coritha. Avelino was the inspiration of her popular song "Lolo Jose" (lit. 'Grandpa Jose'). He is the great-grandfather of actor Paulo Avelino. Calbayog, his birthplace, became a city due to Avelino (as president of the Senate) when he merged three contiguous municipalities (Oquendo, Calbayog and Tinambacan) into the 19th city of the Philippines on July 15, 1948—the date President Elpidio Quirino signed Republic Act No. 328.

== Later life, death, and legacy ==
After his loss in the 1949 elections, he held a post as an ambassador to President Elpidio Quirino, and subsequently returned to practicing law. He died on July 21, 1986, at the age of 95. Honoring his 129th birthday, the Presidential Palace declared August 5, 2019 as a special non-working day in Samar. On social media, the city information office wrote: "The people of Calbayog acknowledge him as The Father of Calbayog City. Together with Congressman Agripino Escareal, he pushed for the creation of the City of Calbayog".

Political offices
Preceded by Manuel Roxas	President of the Senate of the Philippines; 1946–1949	Succeeded by Mariano Jesús Cuenco
Party political offices
Preceded by Manuel Roxas	President of the Liberal Party; 1948–1949	Succeeded by Elpidio Quirino
