= Lingayen–Lucena corridor =

Voting bloc in the Philippines

The locations of Lingayen, Manila and Lucena in the Philippines

The Lingayen–Lucena corridor is the part of Luzon in the Philippines, between Lingayen (in Pangasinan) to Lucena, comprising the province of Pangasinan, and the regions of Central Luzon, Metro Manila, and Calabarzon, where national elections are claimed to be won. The corridor comprises about 40% of all registered voters in the Philippines.

== History ==
Between Lingayen in the north and Lucena in the southern part of Luzon is the part of the Philippines that is described as the most urbanized. This is where the high concentration of television and radio makes advertising in those mediums to be critical in winning votes.

Aside from being easily reached by candidates either via television or radio, it also has the highest number of internet connections, is the primary market of national dailies, and is the wealthiest area in the country. The corridor, which contains up to 40% of voters in the country, has been used as a sample in opinion polls to gauge how candidates are faring.

The voters in the corridor, which has been described as the so-called "market vote", was described in 2003 by Antonio Gatmaitan, political strategist for Eduardo Cojuangco, Jr.'s failed 1992 presidential bid, as the place where anyone can win, and if one can win there, he can win nationally. Market votes are votes which cannot be commanded by political kingpins; this is opposed to the so-called "command votes", which can be delivered by political kingpins.

In 2004, Gatmaitan introduced the corridor plus Naga, Legazpi, Cebu City, Bacolod, Iloilo City, Davao City, Cagayan de Oro and Zamboanga City which together comprises almost 52% of the voters.

=== Electoral history ===
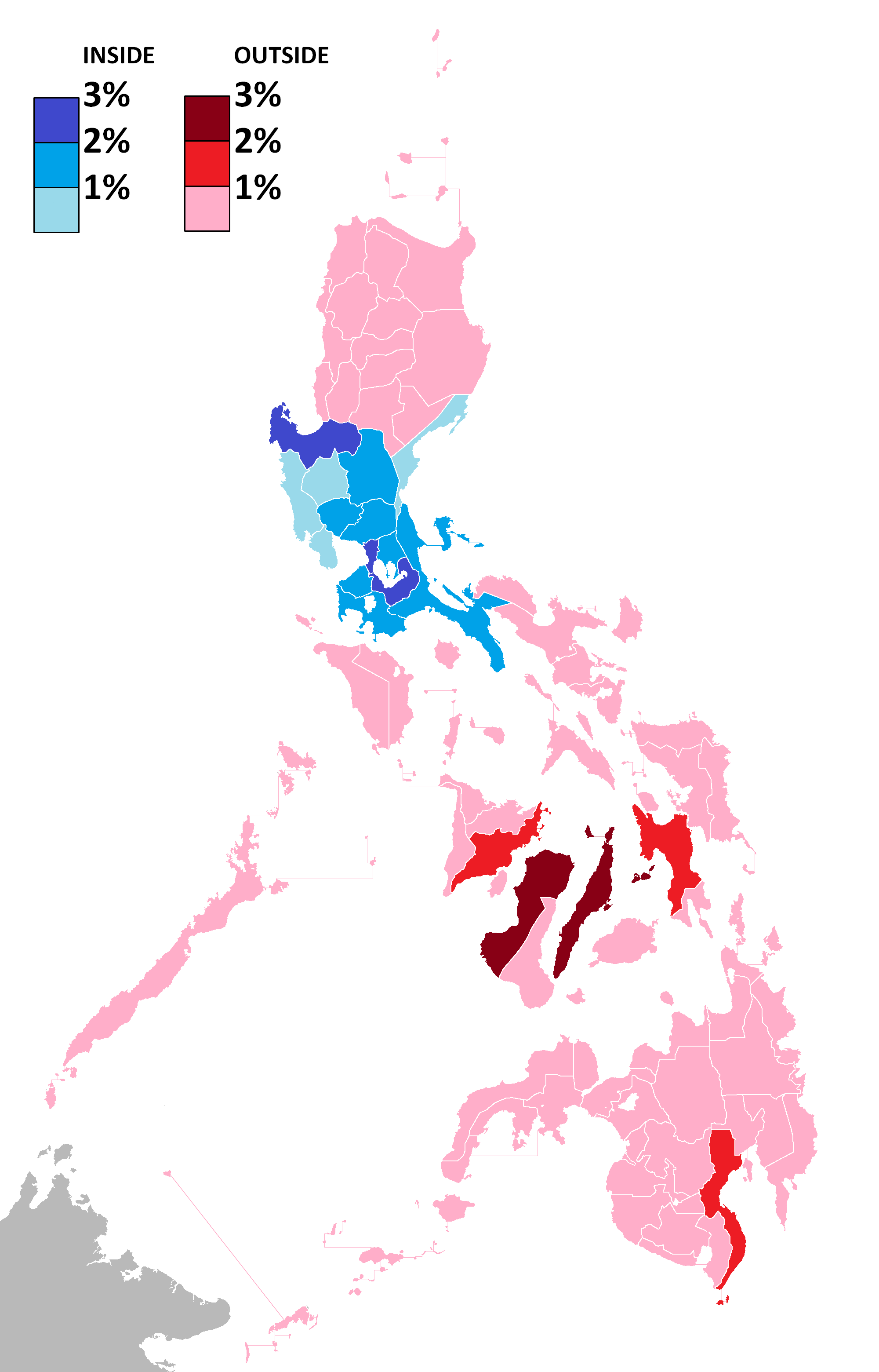
Provinces of the Philippines by percentage of the voting population as of 2010. Those within the corridor are in blue shades, and those outside of it in red shades.

The only post-People Power Revolution presidential election where the winner of the Corridor failed to win nationally was Fernando Poe, Jr. in 2004. In the thirteen provinces/regions of the corridor (Aurora, Bataan, Batangas, Bulacan, Cavite, Laguna, Metro Manila, Nueva Ecija, Pampanga, Quezon, Rizal, Tarlac, and Zambales), Poe won 40.8% of the total votes cast, or 4.65 million votes, 1.32 million more than did Gloria Macapagal-Arroyo, who won 29.2% or 3.33 million. GMA more than made up for this deficit in the Visayas.

In the 15 provinces (Aklan, Antique, Biliran, Bohol, Capiz, Cebu, Eastern Samar, Guimaras, Iloilo, Leyte, Negros Occidental, Negros Oriental, Northern Samar, Samar and Southern Leyte) of Western, Central, and Eastern Visayas, GMA won 61% or 3.6 million votes, versus 27% or 1.6 million votes for FPJ, an insurmountable wave of more than 2 million votes. (In Cebu alone, GMA won just under a million votes or 79.9% of the total, opening up an 842,531 vote lead.) Adding the Visayas results to the Corridor tally, GMA led with 697,039 votes.

Alleged cheating and vote-tampering in the Autonomous Region in Muslim Mindanao does not negate this result. Official results from the five provinces of ARMM plus Sultan Kudarat and Isabela City, Basilan, show that GMA won 685,076 votes there. Even if GMA did not win a single vote in ARMM and all of the votes were given to Poe, it would still fall short of the 697,000-vote defeat of the Corridor by the Visayas.

What would become Metro Manila, Bulacan, Rizal, and Laguna have all voted for the same candidate starting from the 1961 election.

== Composition ==
Province/Region	2010 voters	Percent	2016 voters	Percent	2019 voters	Percent	2022 voters	Percent
Calabarzon	6,736,126	13.28%	7,619,272	14.02%	8,674,351	14.02%	9,193,096	13.98%
Central Luzon	5,648,686	11.14%	6,056,392	11.14%	6,829,661	11.04%	7,289,791	11.09%
Metro Manila (National Capital Region)	6,137,728	12.10%	6,253,249	11.50%	7,074,603	11.43%	7,322,361	11.14%
Pangasinan (part of Region I)	1,621,959	3.20%	1,705,260	3.14%	1,946,692	3.14%	2,096,936	3.19%
Lingayen–Lucena corridor	20,144,499	39.71%	21,634,173	39.80%	24,525,307	39.65%	25,848,184	39.32%
Philippines	50,723,733	100%	54,363,844	100%	61,843,771	100%	65,745,526	100%

== See also ==
- Solid North, part of Luzon dominated by the Ilocano people that voted solidly for Ferdinand Marcos and his family and allies (ironically, Lingayen and Pangasinan overlaps part of the latter aside from this corridor).
- Urban Luzon
