= Solid North =

Voting bloc in the Philippines

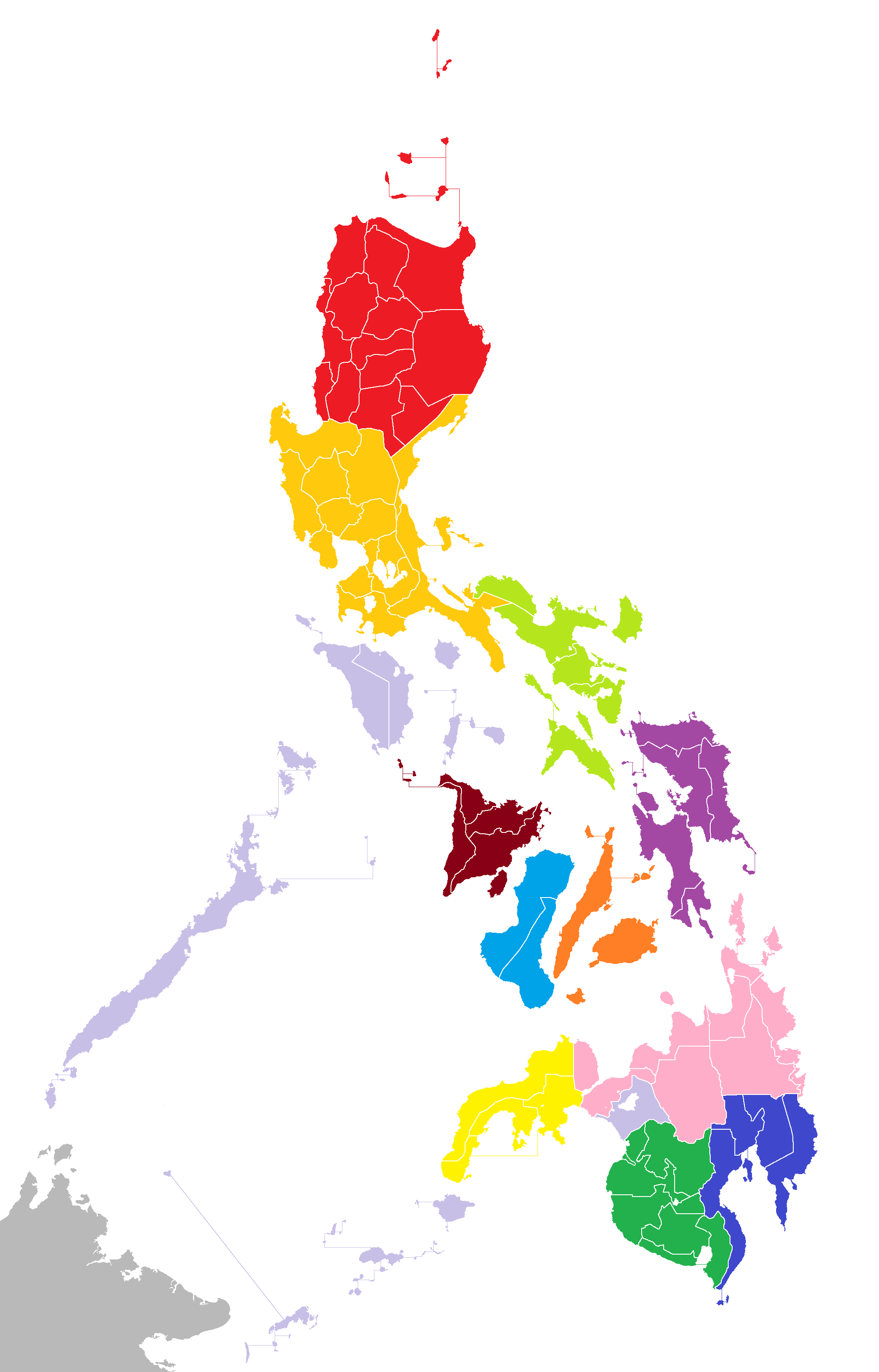
Areas under the Solid North are colored red

The Solid North is a political narrative in the Philippines which posits the existence of a regional voting bloc in the northern provinces of the Philippines for politicians of Ilocano descent - more particularly the Marcos family and their allies. Built on a foundation of political patronage, it is also associated with the presence of persistent political dynasties and socio-economic monopolies, while minimizing incidents of coercive political violence. The provinces often considered part of the Solid North are Ilocos Region, Cordillera Administrative Region (CAR), and Cagayan Valley.

The exact phrase was first extensively used during Ferdinand Marcos' campaign for the 1965 Philippine presidential election. The electoral phenomenon was most prominent during the presidency of Ferdinand Marcos as he consolidated regional loyalties for himself, but then waned after his ouster during the People Power Revolution; the north no longer delivered a reliable bloc vote from 1992 until 2016, when Marcos' son, Bongbong Marcos, ran for the vice presidency in 2016 and won in the Solid North provinces, except for Batanes.

== History ==
The provinces with at least a plurality of its population being Ilocano people are denoted by green on the map.

The phrase "Solid North" was first used during Ferdinand Marcos' campaign for the 1965 Philippine presidential election, but there had been some precedent of politicians and political groups acquiring commanding electoral margins in Northern Luzon prior to then. After winning the presidency, Ferdinand Marcos heavily promoted the idea of the solid north, portraying himself as invincible in the region and effectively trivializing the opposition in the Northern Luzon provinces as well as the election violence that defined Ilocano politics of that time. The first persisted in the post-Marcos years despite the fact that the phenomenon it was describing did not necessarily hold statistically true anymore until the 2016 Philippine presidential election when Bongbong Marcos won every Northern Luzon province except Batanes.

=== Prior to independence ===
In the first national elections in 1907, the North became a stronghold of the Progresista Party, the primary opposition party to the Nacionalista Party at that time.

=== The postwar era ===
Before the election of Ferdinand Marcos in 1965, it was President Elpidio Quirino who consistently carried the Ilocano heartland in the presidential elections during which he was a candidate. Despite Ramon Magsaysay's landslide victory in the 1953 presidential election, Quirino still won in his home province of Ilocos Sur, as well as Ilocos Norte, Abra and La Union.

=== The Marcos era ===
In the 1965 presidential election, Senator Ferdinand Marcos of the Nacionalista Party, from Ilocos Norte, faced the incumbent president Diosdado Macapagal of the Liberal Party, who hailed from Pampanga. Marcos successfully campaigned on the issues of graft, peace and order, and economic progress, although these had been staple campaign issues since independence. Marcos carried not only the Solid North, but most of Luzon as well, with Macapagal only carrying the provinces of Pampanga, Tarlac and Bataan.

It was during the 1965 election campaign that the exact phrase "Solid North" first became extensively used, in connection to the electoral machinery Marcos had established by allying with three dominant politicians of the time: Floro Crisologo of Ilocos Sur, Manuel T. Cases of La Union, and Antonio Raquiza of Ilocos Norte.

While Marcos won an even larger mandate during his successful reelection bid in 1969, support from the Solid North was not as crucial in his victory. Pampanga and Antique in the Visayas were the only provinces that he did not win.

=== 1986 snap presidential election ===
Marcos eventually declared martial law and stayed in power until 1986, when he called for a "snap election". With his popularity declining after the assassination of Benigno Aquino Jr., Marcos relied heavily on support from the Solid North in the 1986 election, when he faced Aquino's widow, Corazon Aquino. Marcos depended on the Ilocos Region, described as "impregnable to the opposition", and on Eastern Visayas, the home region of his wife, First Lady Imelda Marcos. Marcos was eventually declared the winner but allegations of massive fraud erupted into the People Power Revolution which drove the Marcoses into exile and concluded with Aquino's ascension into the presidency.

=== Fifth Republic elections ===
Beginning in 1992, the Solid North did not deliver a solid vote for a single candidate. Two figures associated with Ferdinand Marcos, his widow, Imelda Marcos, and one of his allies, Danding Cojuangco, won in several provinces of the Solid North. In the vice presidential election, Joseph Estrada won all provinces as running mate of Cojuangco. In 1998, Imelda, who initially planned to run again, endorsed eventual winner Joseph Estrada, who won in all northern provinces except Cagayan which was won by Juan Ponce Enrile.

In 2004, Fernando Poe Jr.'s campaign was endorsed by Imelda for the presidency. He would win in most provinces except Benguet, Ifugao, Ilocos Sur, Kalinga, and Mountain Province. Poe narrowly lost to incumbent president Gloria Macapagal Arroyo, but the election would later be tainted by fraud allegations.

In 2010, the Marcoses supported the candidacy of Manny Villar of the Nacionalista Party, while Joseph Estrada ran again but without support from the Marcoses. The bloc was divided between Villar, Estrada, and winner Aquino III in the presidential election; and divided between winner Jejomar Binay, Loren Legarda and KBL candidate Jay Sonza. Both Villar and Estrada lost the presidential election. Meanwhile, several Marcoses ran in the elections; Bongbong Marcos, who ran for senator under Villar's slate, won a seat, Imelda Marcos won a seat in the House of Representatives, and Imee Marcos won the gubernatorial election in Ilocos Norte. Bongbong's Senate victory is the highest elected position won by a Marcos since their ouster in 1986. According to Bongbong, his candidacy made the Solid North "intact again."

In 2016, Bongbong ran for vice president as the running mate of senator Miriam Defensor Santiago. Marcos won in all of the Solid North provinces except Batanes, but lost to Leni Robredo. Marcos later filed an electoral protest which was dismissed. In the presidential race, the bloc was not as solid, with some voting for Jejomar Binay, running mate of Estrada in 2010, and Rodrigo Duterte, who has been endorsed by some alongside Marcos, and Grace Poe, daughter of Fernando Poe Jr.

In 2022, Bongbong ran for president alongside Sara Duterte as his running mate. Marcos won again in all provinces except Batanes, while Duterte won in all of the Solid North provinces.

== Solid North in the presidential elections ==
Key:

- Boldface: Winner
- Italicized: Marcos, or candidate supported by the Marcoses.

Year	Ilocos Region				Cagayan Valley					Cordillera Administrative Region						
Year	Ilocos Norte	Ilocos Sur	La Union	Pangasinan	Batanes	Cagayan	Isabela	Nueva Vizcaya	Quirino	Abra	Kalinga	Apayao	Baguio	Benguet	Ifugao	Mountain Province
1965	**Marcos**															
1969	**Marcos**															
1981	**Marcos**															
1986	**Marcos**															
1992	Marcos		Cojuangco	**Ramos**		Marcos	Cojuangco		Mitra	Cojuangco	Marcos		Santiago	Mitra		**Ramos**
1998	**Estrada**			de Venecia	Lim	Enrile	**Estrada**						de Venecia	**Estrada**		
2004	Poe	**Arroyo**	Poe								**Arroyo**	Poe	**Arroyo**			
2010	Villar		Estrada	**Aquino**		Estrada							**Aquino**			
2016	**Duterte**	Poe			Roxas	Binay							**Duterte**	Poe		
2022	**Marcos**				Robredo	**Marcos**										

=== Election maps ===
In these maps, the provinces of the candidates where one won at least a plurality of votes is shaded.

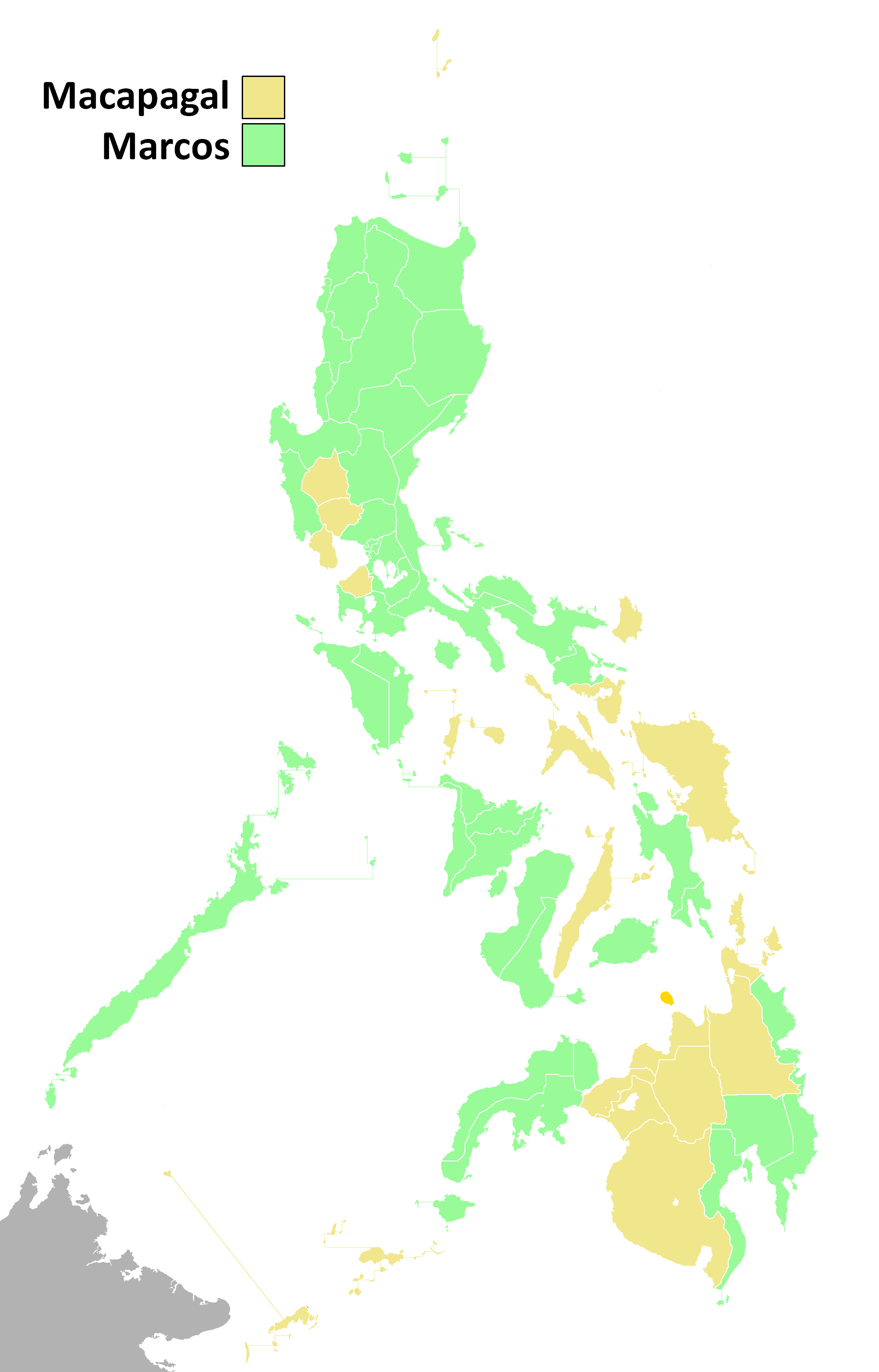
Provinces where Marcos won at least a plurality are in light green.

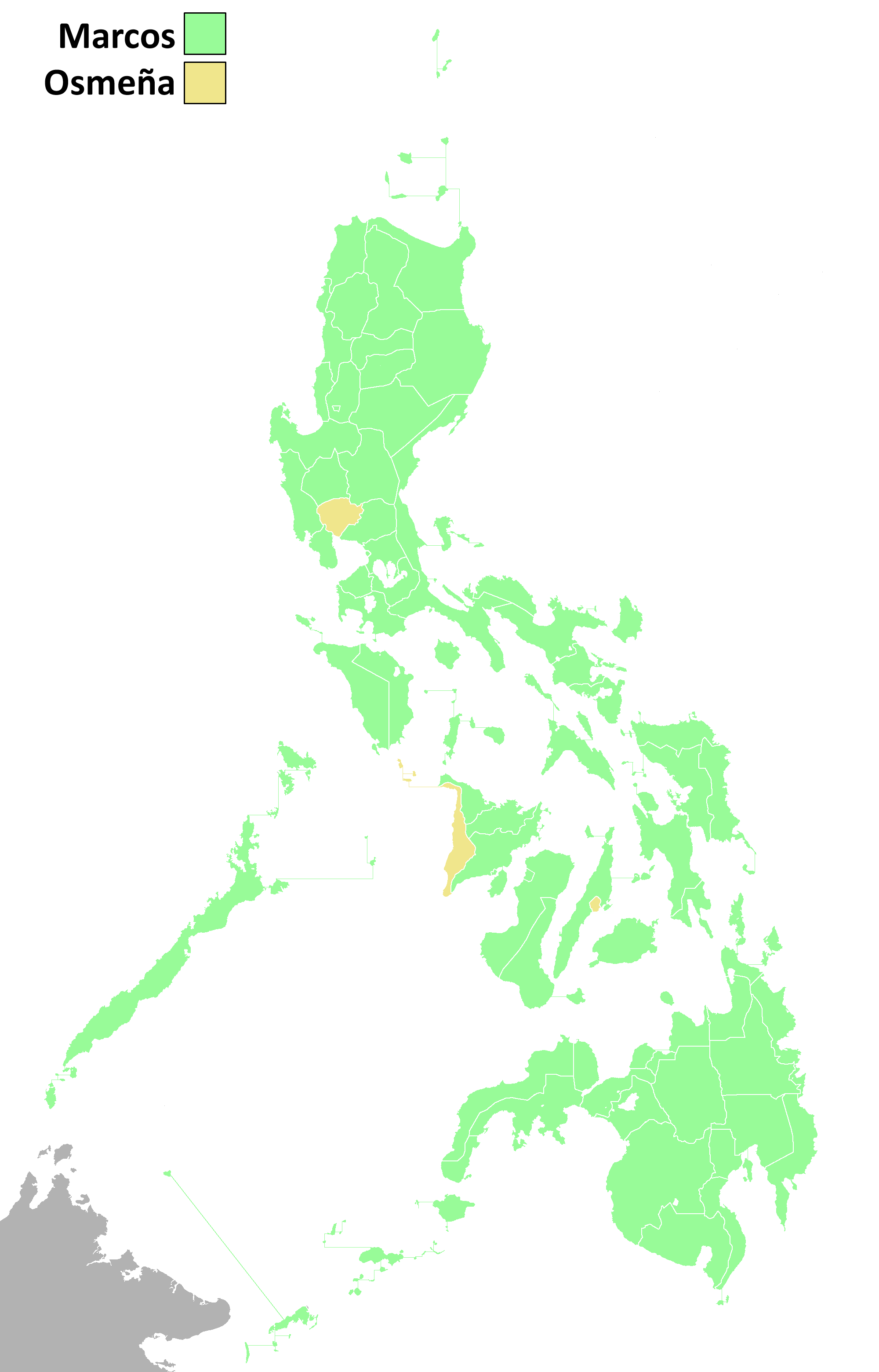
Provinces where Marcos won at least a plurality are in light green.

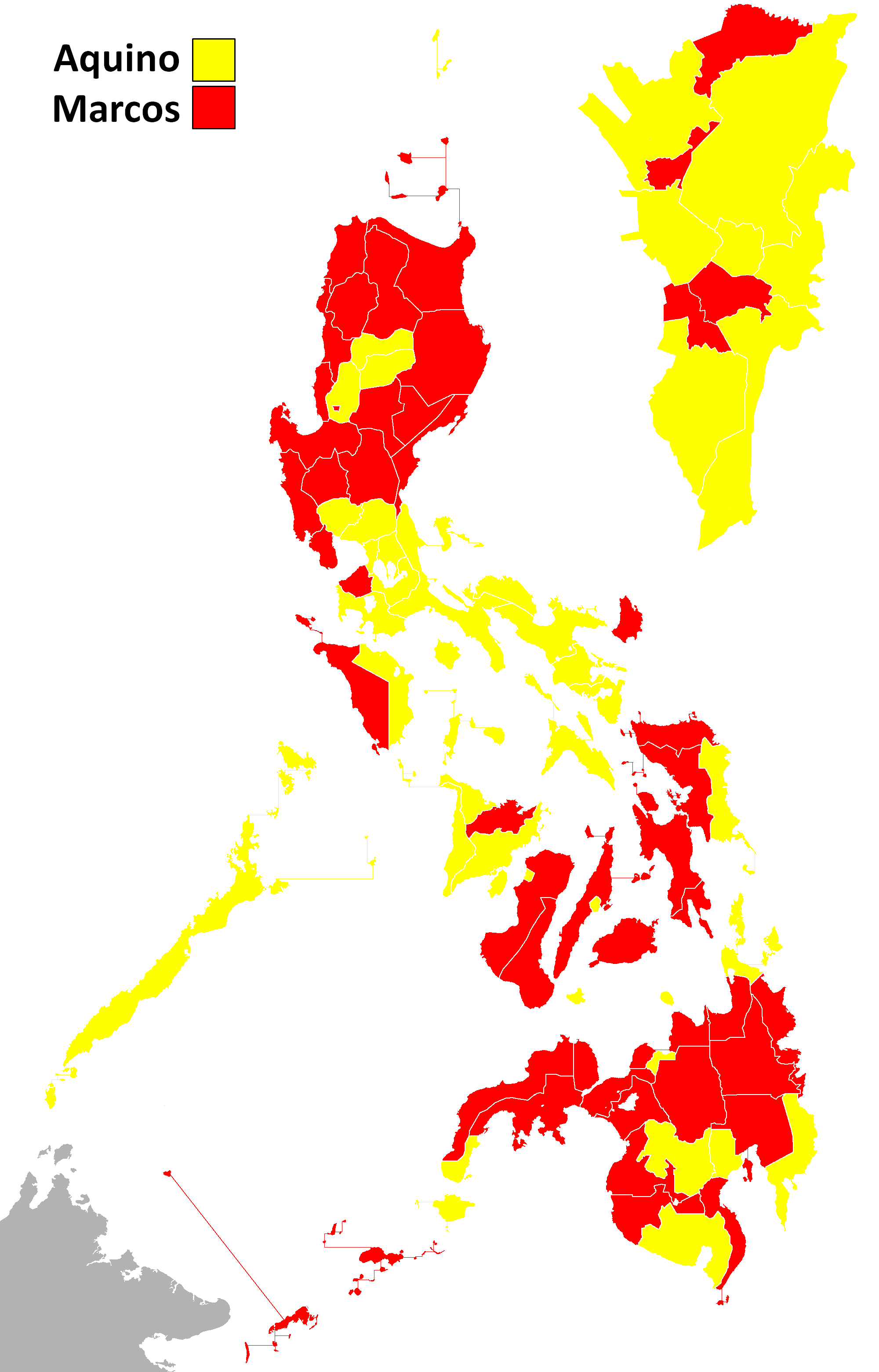
Provinces where Marcos won at least a plurality are in red. This is the clearest manifestation of the Solid North.

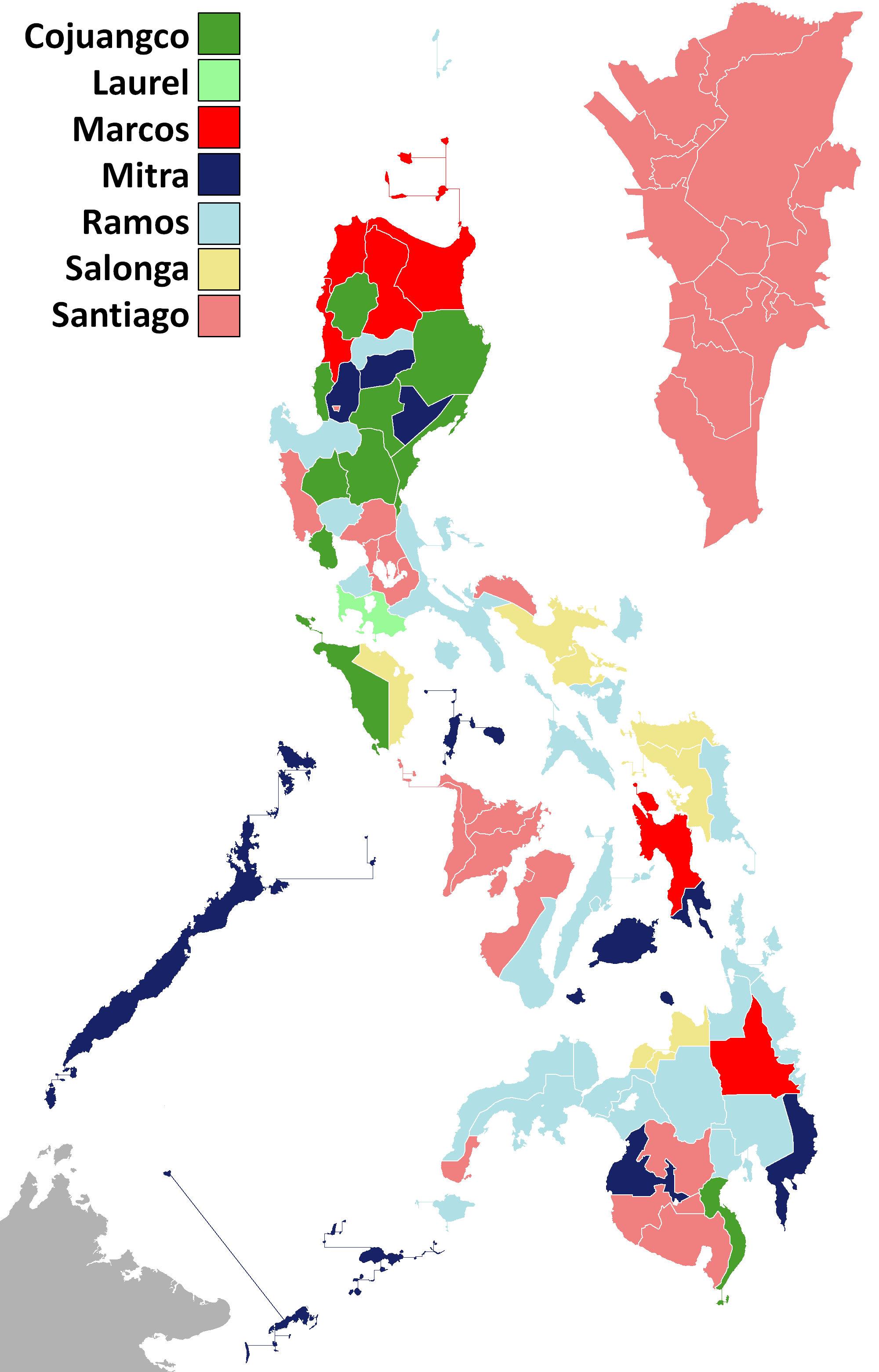
Provinces where Marcos won at least a plurality are in red; provinces where Marcos' ally Danding Cojuangco won at least a plurality are in dark green.

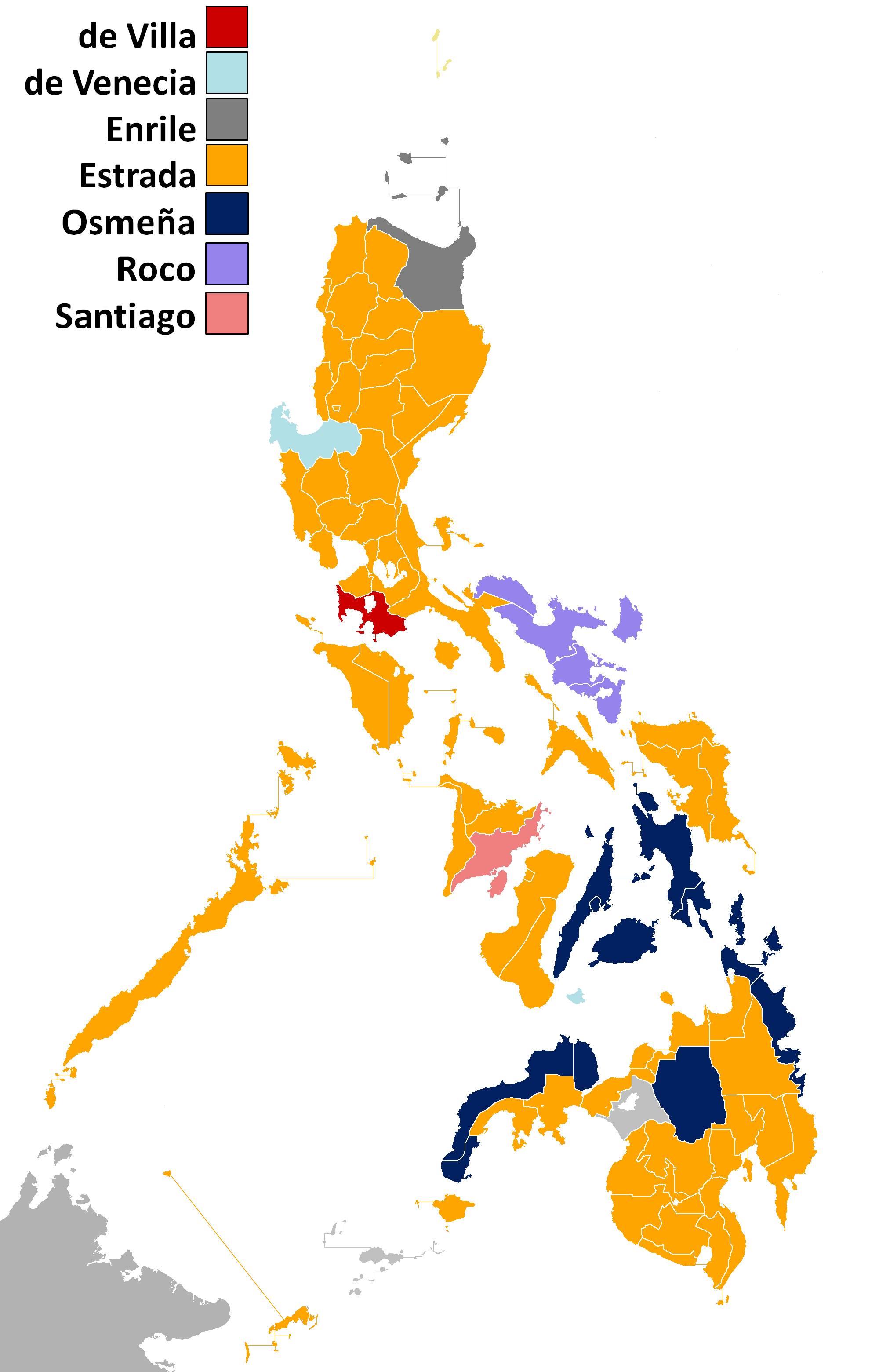
Provinces where Estrada won at least a plurality are in orange; provinces where Marcos' ally Juan Ponce Enrile won at least a plurality are in gray. The Marcoses supported Estrada in the election.

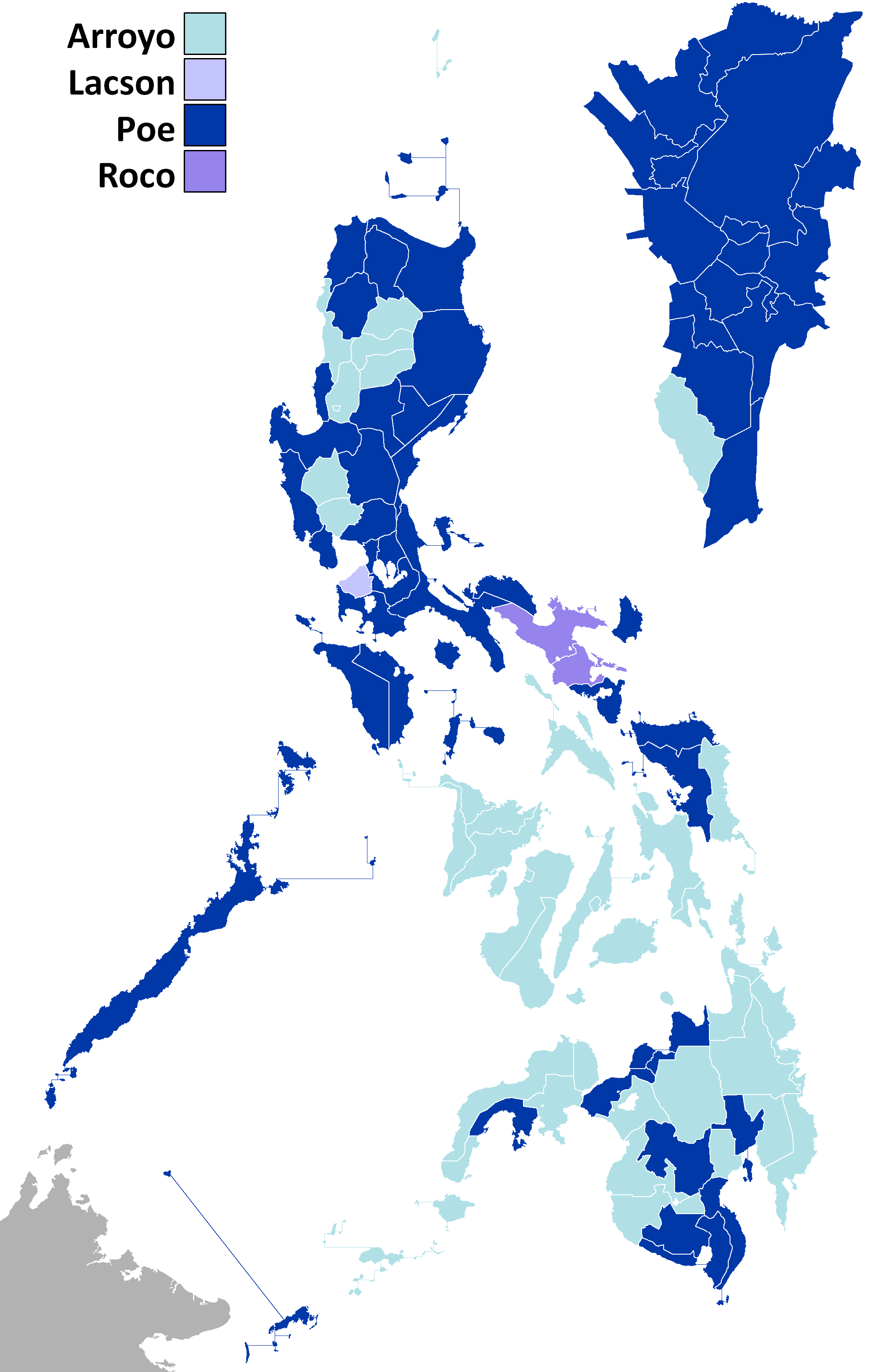
Provinces where Poe won at least a plurality are in dark blue. The Marcoses supported Poe in the election.

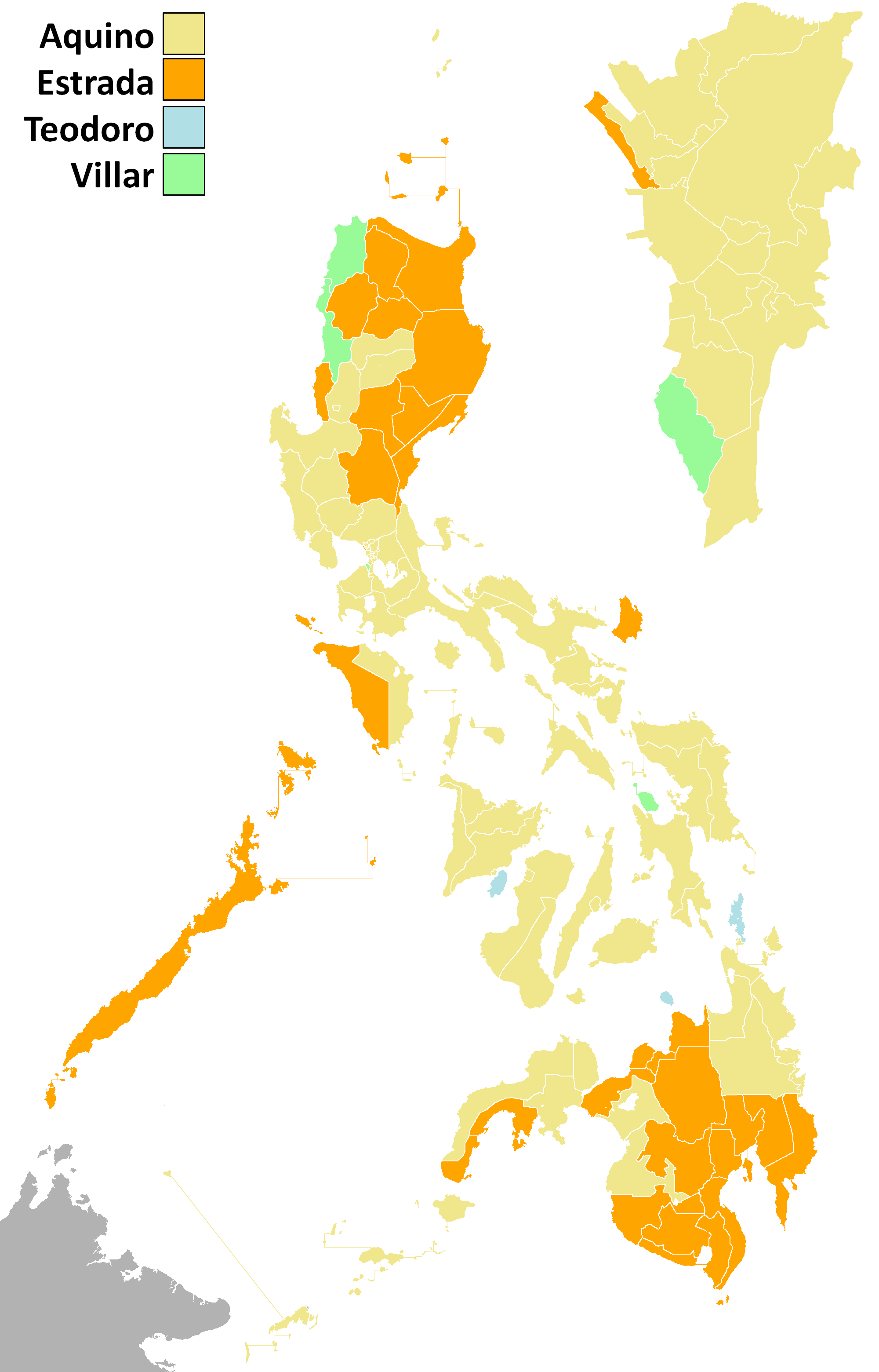
Provinces where Villar won at least a plurality are in light green; provinces where Estrada won at least a plurality are in orange. The Marcoses supported Villar in the election.

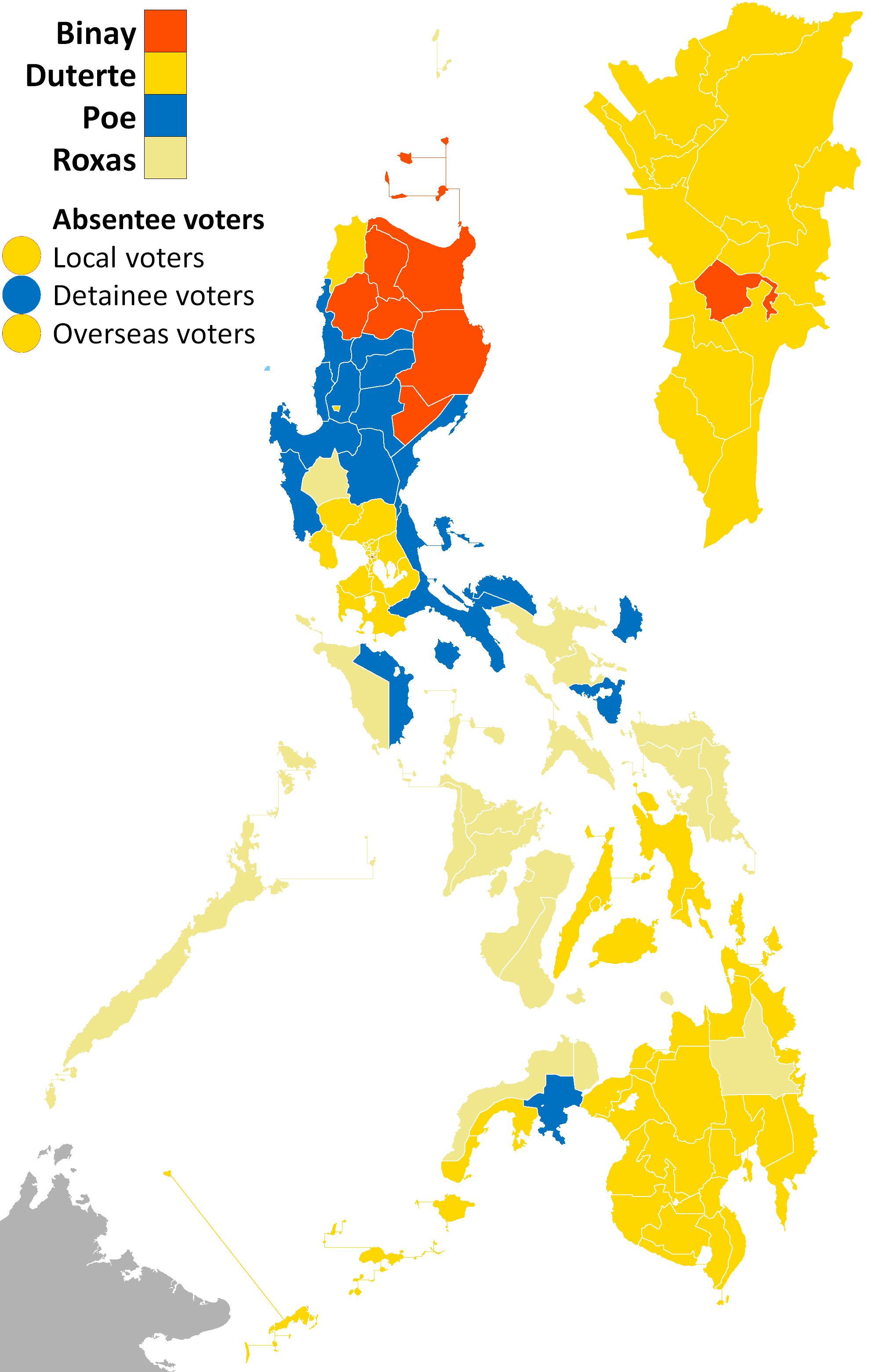
Provinces where Duterte won at least a plurality are in bright yellow. The Marcoses supported both Duterte and Defensor-Santiago in the election. Provinces where Binay (former running mate of Estrada) won at least a plurality are in orange. Provinces where Poe's daughter won at least a plurality are in blue.

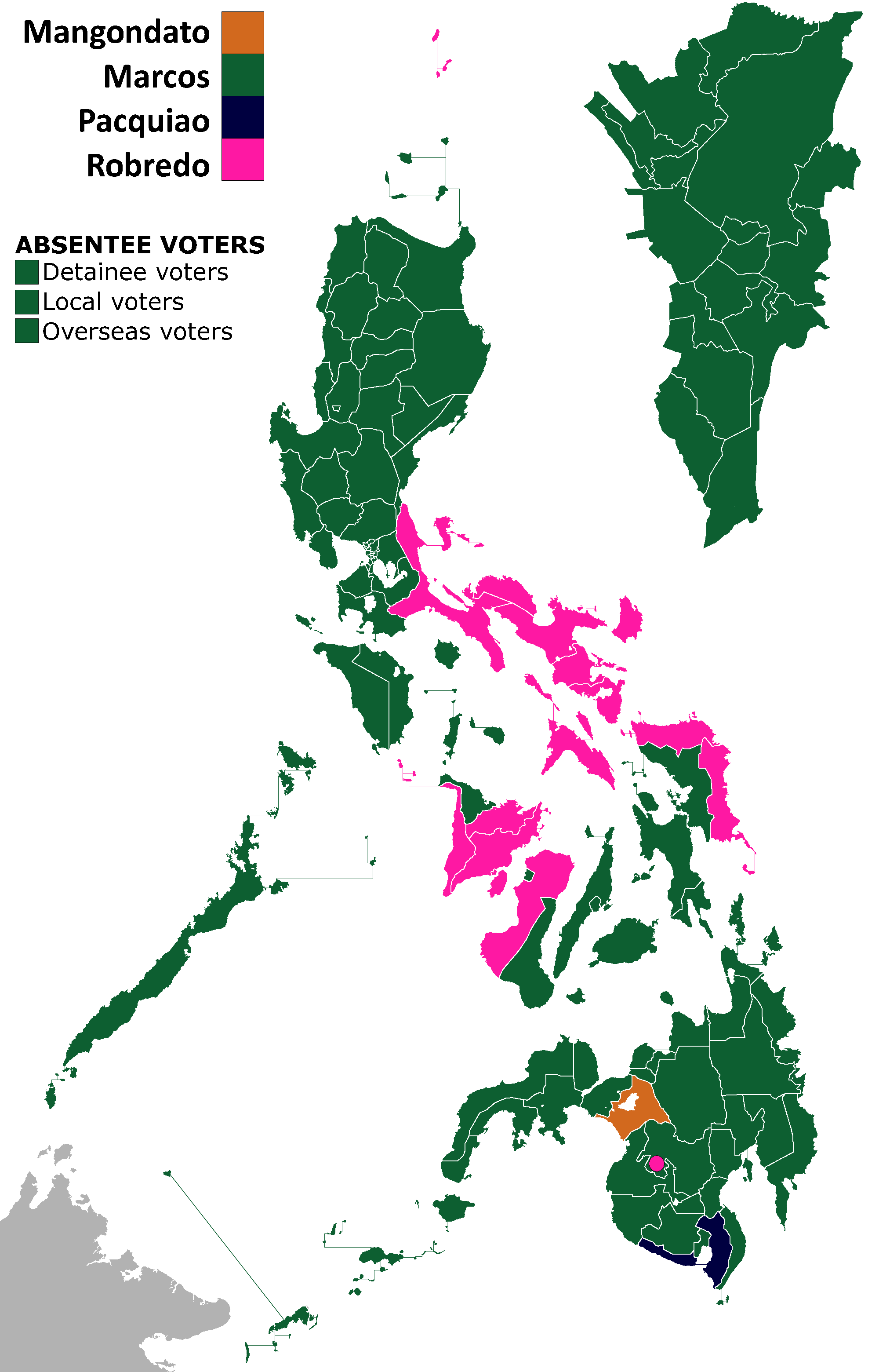
Provinces where Marcos won at least a plurality are in jade green.

== Solid North in the vice presidential elections ==
Key:

- Boldface: Winner
- Italicized: Marcos, or candidate supported by the Marcoses.

Year	Ilocos Region				Cagayan Valley					Cordillera Administrative Region						
Year	Ilocos Norte	Ilocos Sur	La Union	Pangasinan	Batanes	Cagayan	Isabela	Nueva Vizcaya	Quirino	Abra	Kalinga	Apayao	Baguio	Benguet	Ifugao	Mountain Province
1965	**Lopez**				Roxas	**Lopez**										
1969	**Lopez**															
1986	Tolentino															
1992	**Estrada**												Magsaysay, Jr.		**Estrada**	
1998	**Arroyo**															
2004	Legarda	**de Castro**	Legarda	**de Castro**		Legarda					**de Castro**	Legarda		**de Castro**		Legarda
2010	**Binay**	Roxas	**Binay**	Roxas		**Binay**							Roxas			
2016	Marcos				**Robredo**	Marcos										
2022	**Duterte**															

=== Election maps ===
In these maps, the provinces of the candidates where one won at least a plurality of votes is shaded.

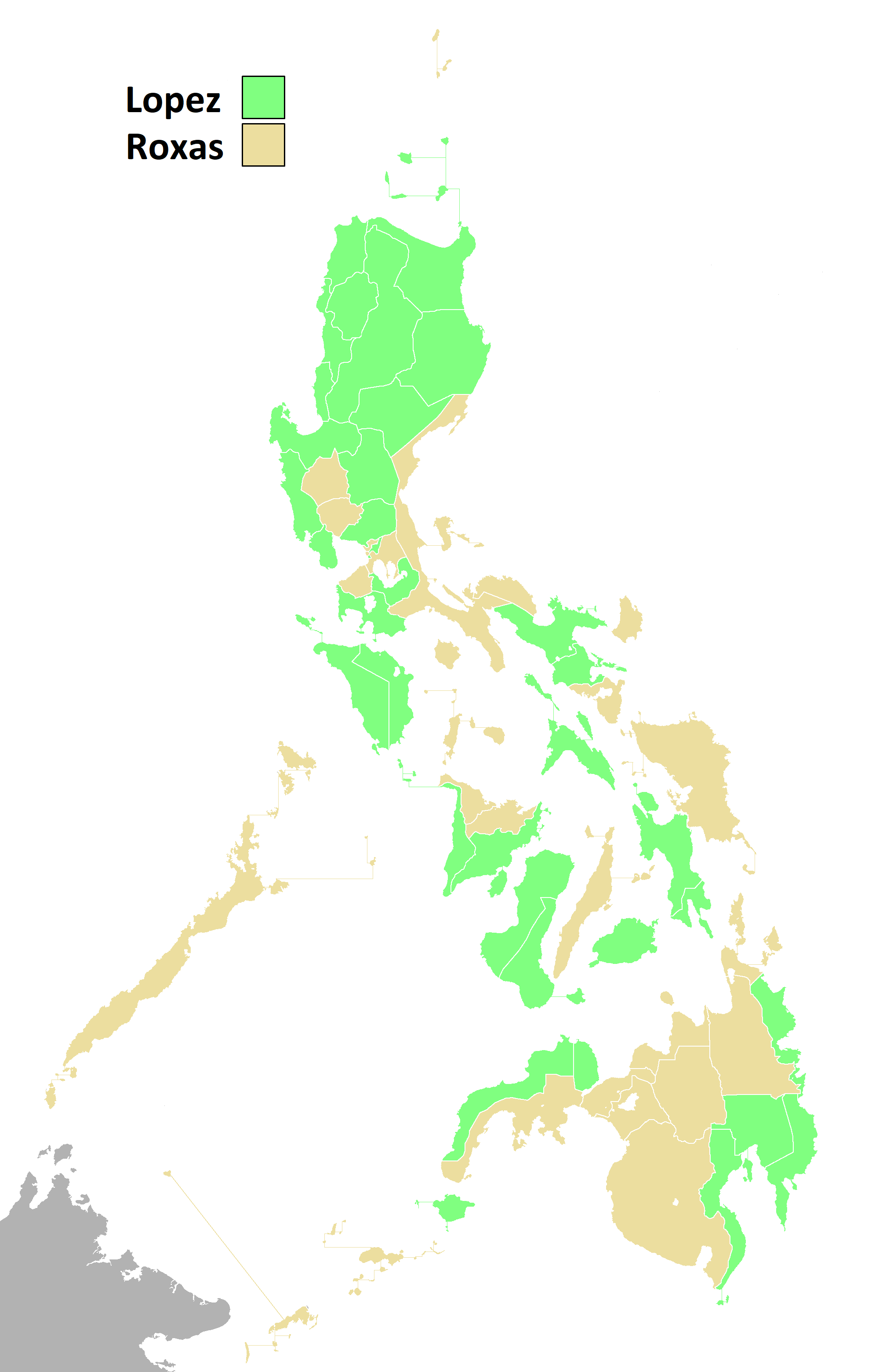
Provinces where Lopez won at least a plurality are in light green. The Marcoses supported Lopez in the election.

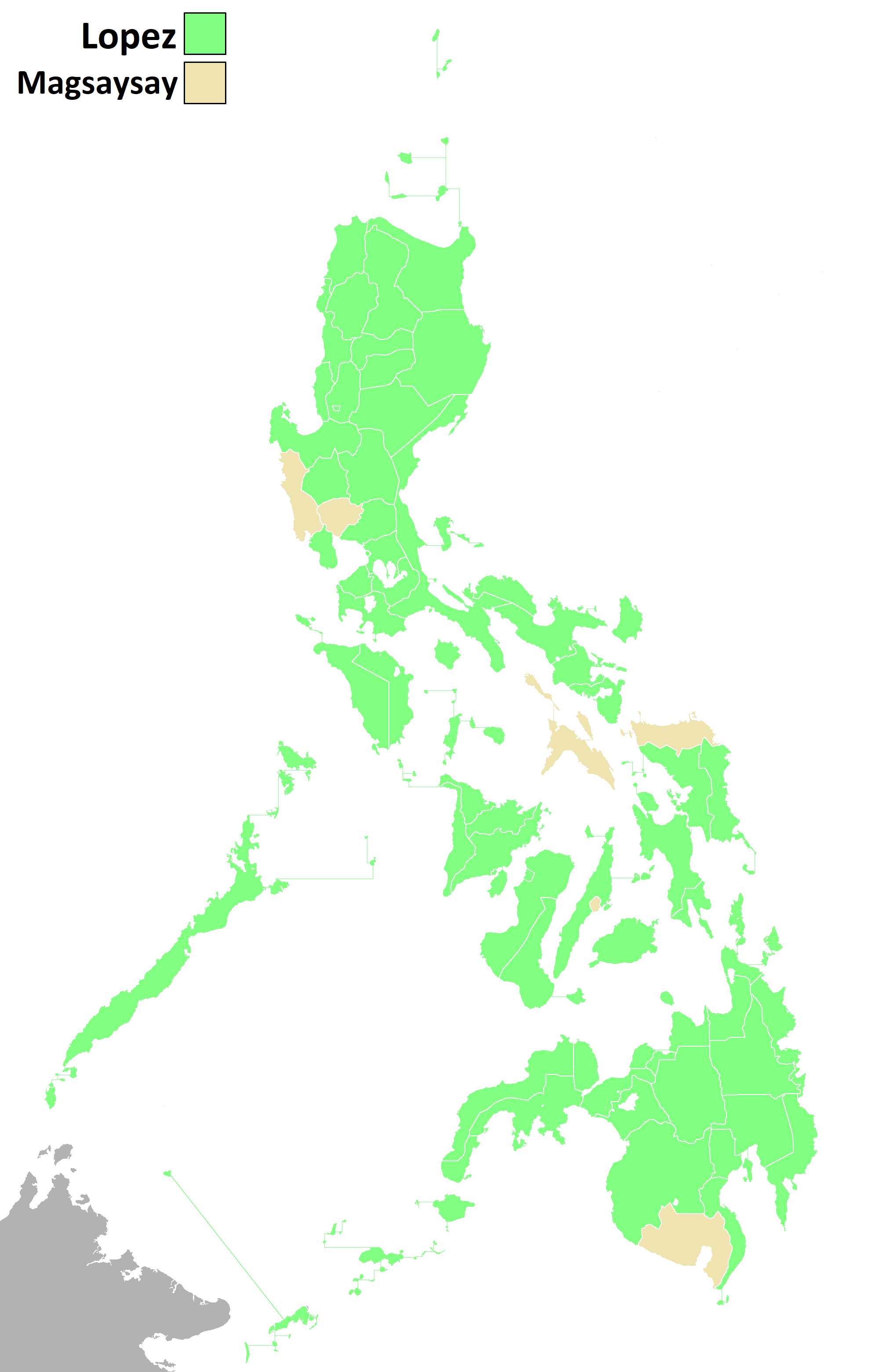
Provinces where Lopez won at least a plurality are in light green. The Marcoses supported Lopez in the election.

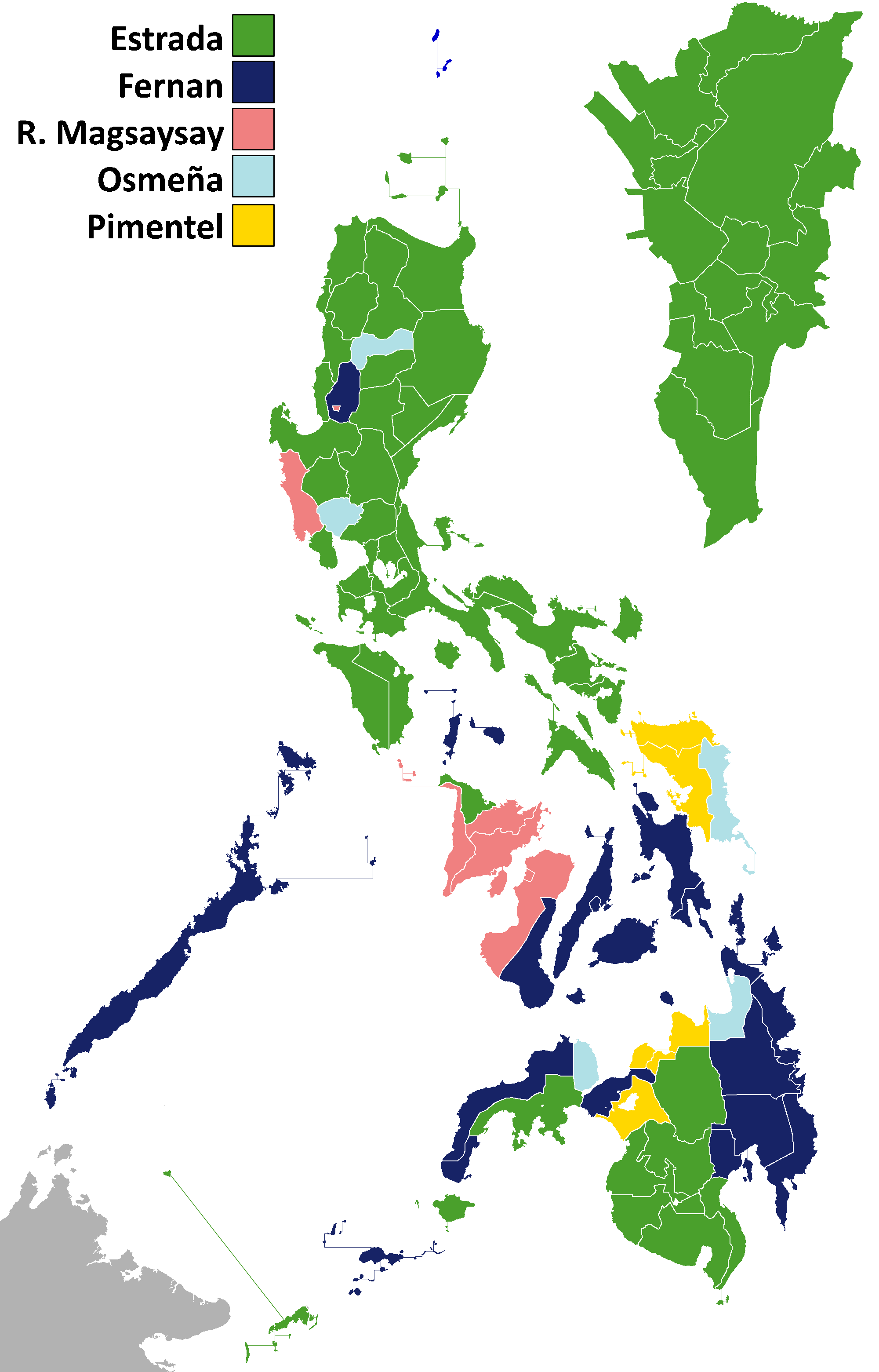
Provinces where Estrada (running mate of Cojuangco) won at least a plurality are in dark green. Marcos' running mate Vicente Magsaysay won no provinces.

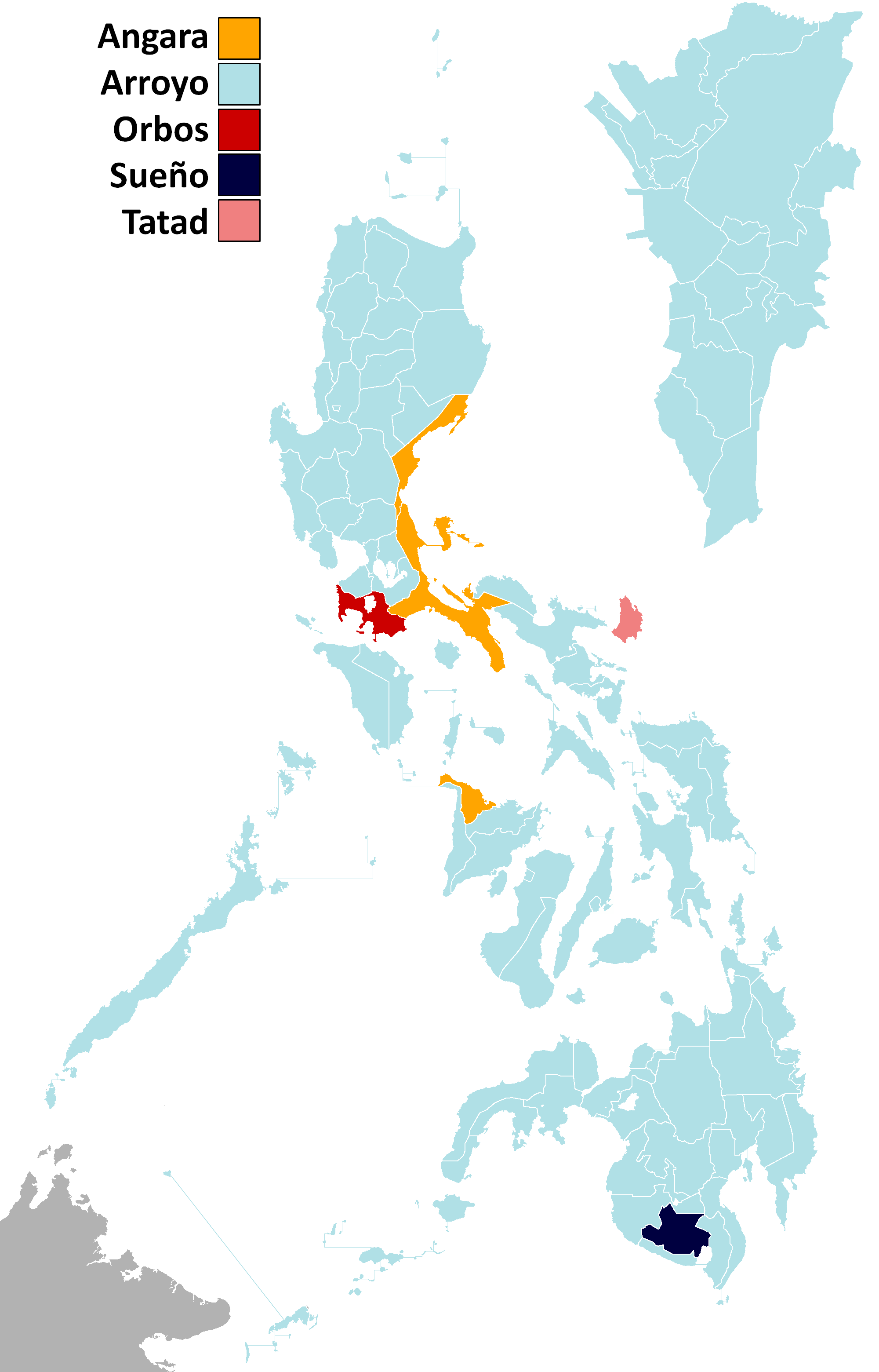
Provinces where Arroyo won at least a plurality are in light blue.

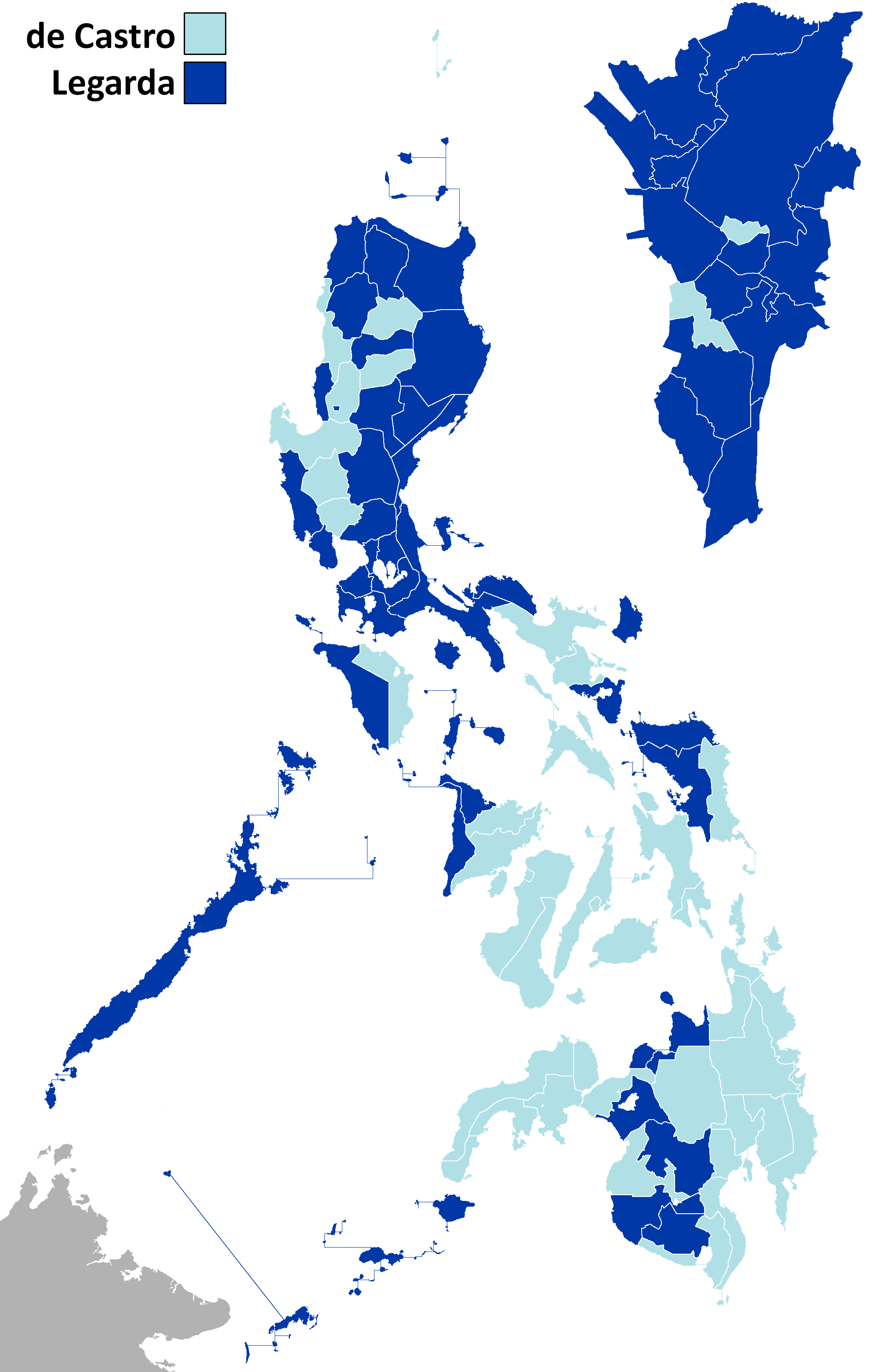
Provinces where Legarda won at least a plurality are in dark blue. The Marcoses supported Legarda in the election.

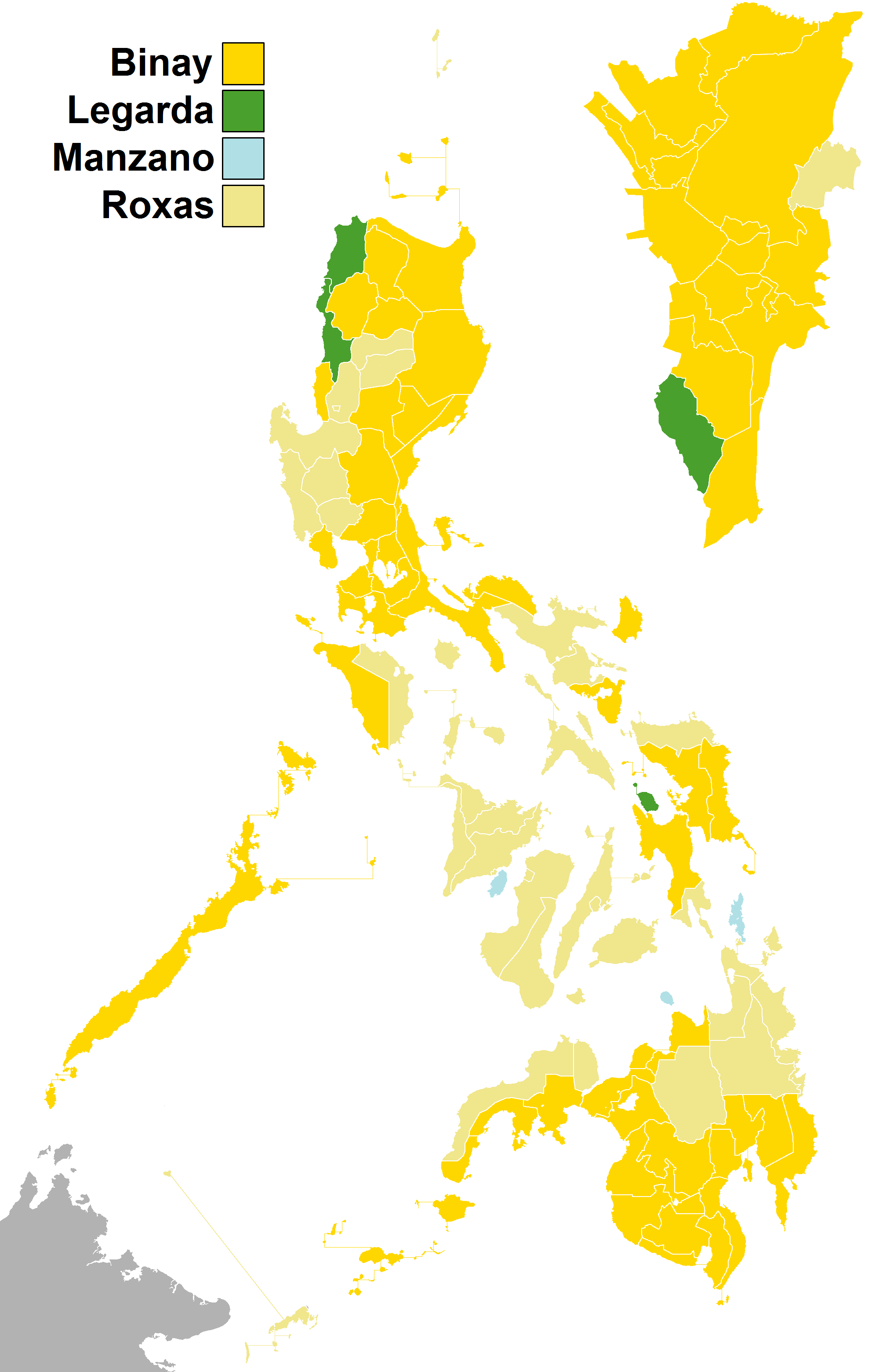
Provinces where Jejomar Binay (running mate of Estrada) won at least a plurality are in bright yellow; provinces where Legarda won at least a plurality are in dark green.

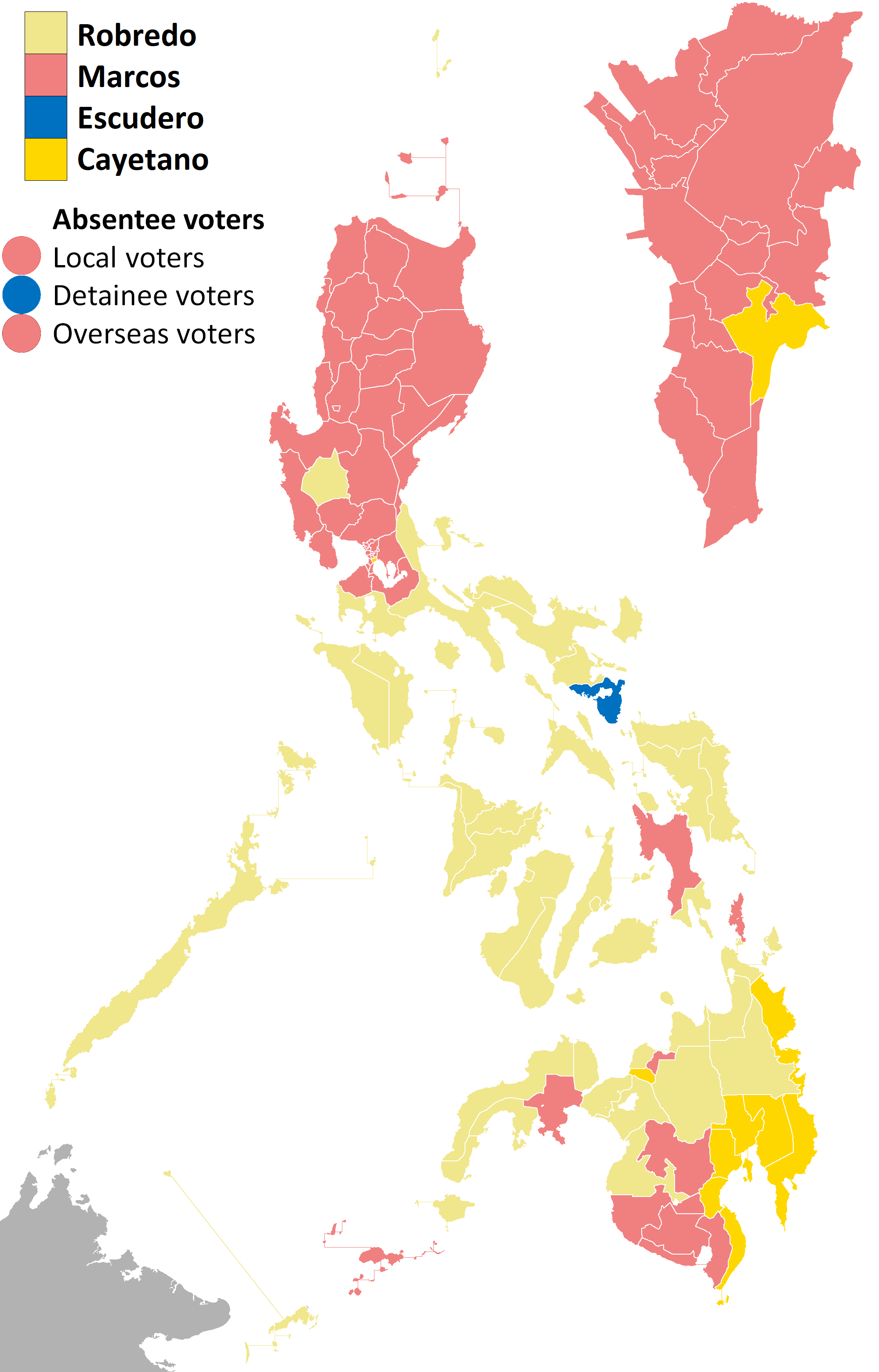
Provinces where Marcos won at least a plurality are in pink.

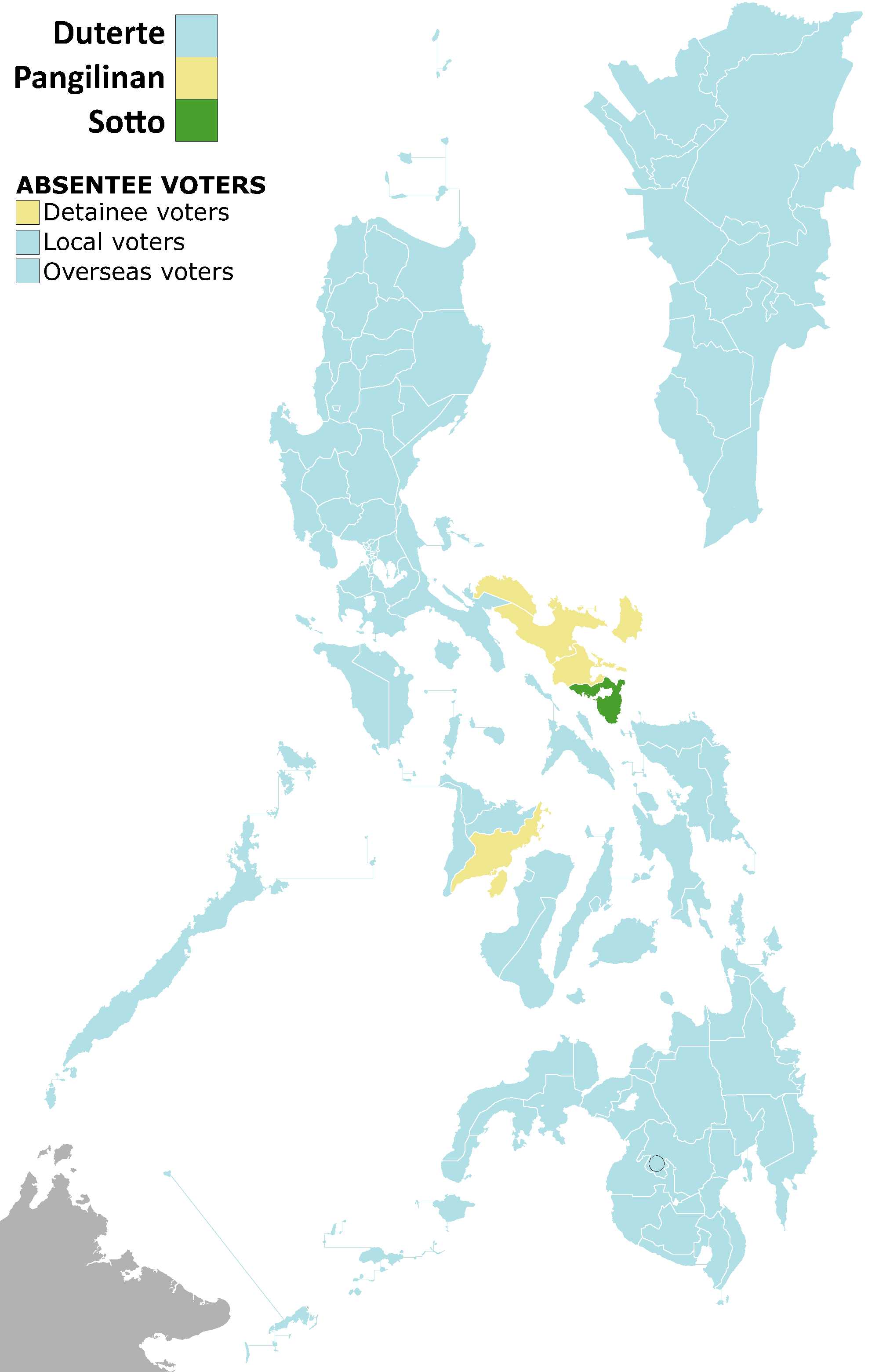
Provinces where Duterte won at least a plurality are in light blue. The Marcoses supported Duterte in the election.

== Solid South as an equivalent ==
Its southern counterpart, called Solid South (not to be confused with the American Solid South), refers to either part or all of Mindanao as a voting bloc, supporting politicians from Mindanao, especially the Duterte family and their allies. The term "Solid South" first emerged after then Davao City mayor Rodrigo Duterte won the presidency with a majority of provinces in Mindanao voting for him.

== See also ==
- Counterparts in other countries
  - Blue wall, American counterpart
  - Canadian Prairies, Canadian counterpart
  - Red wall, British counterpart
  - Solid South, near-defunct American counterpart
- Lingayen–Lucena corridor, where the national elections have said to be "won".
- Ticket balance
