= Congressional canvass for the 2004 Philippine presidential election =

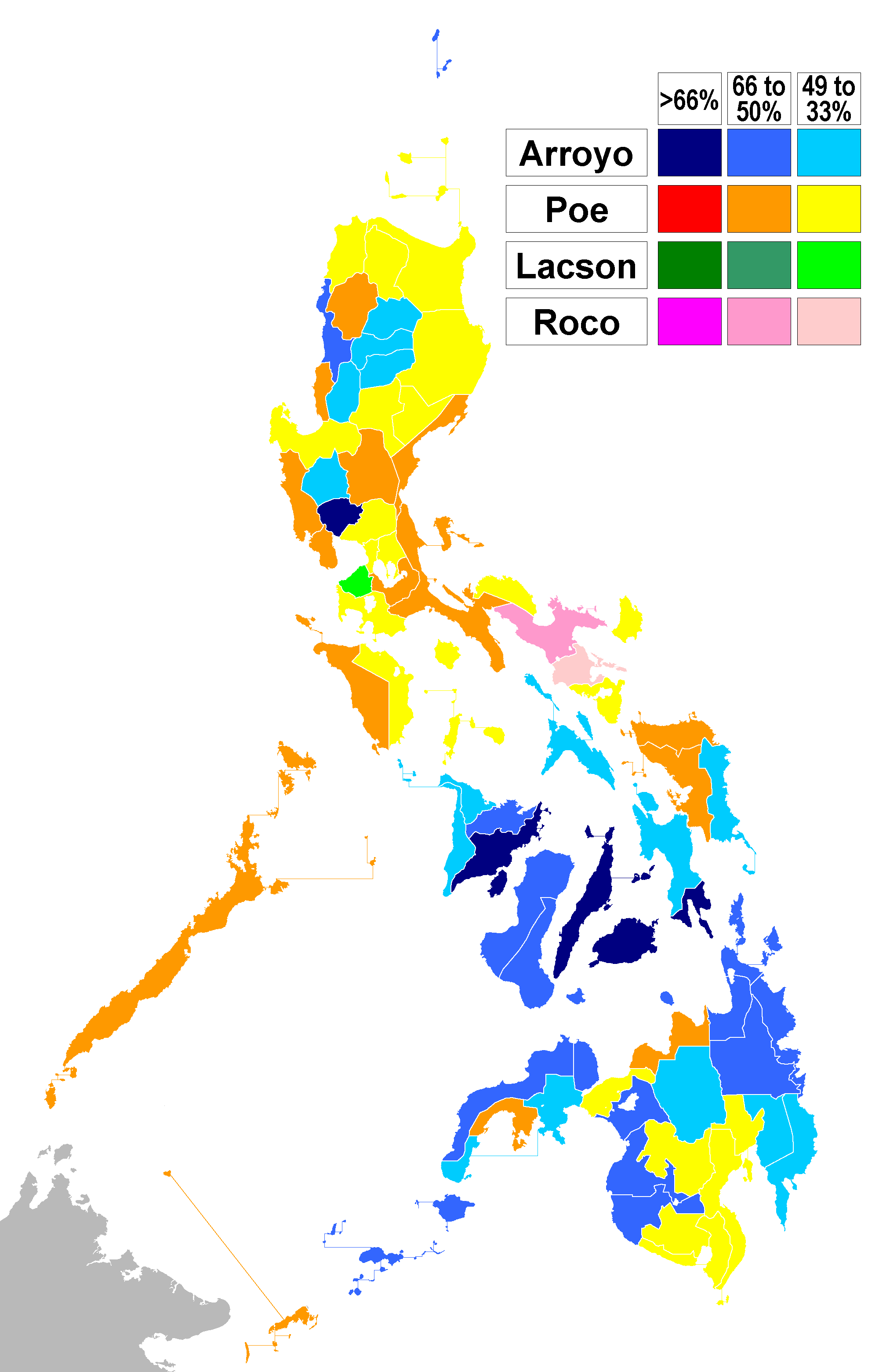
Percentages per province.

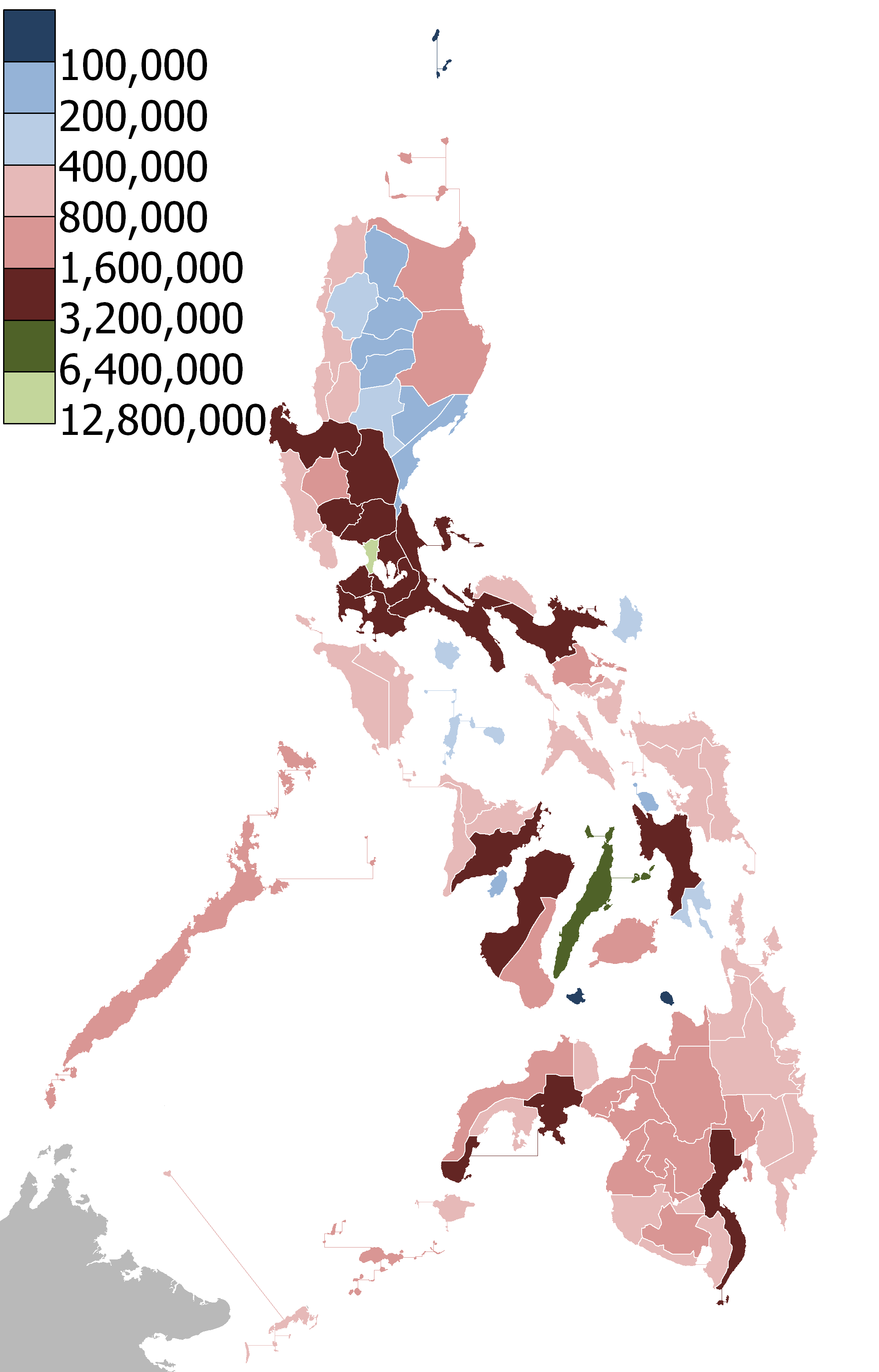
Population per province.

The following is the official canvassing of votes by the Congress of the Philippines for the 2004 Philippine presidential election.

== Presidential election ==
Candidate	Party	Votes	%
Gloria Macapagal Arroyo	Lakas–CMD	12,905,808	39.99
Fernando Poe Jr.	Koalisyon ng Nagkakaisang Pilipino	11,782,232	36.51
Panfilo Lacson	Laban ng Demokratikong Pilipino (Aquino wing) (Note: Lacson ran under the wing of the LDP led by Butz Aquino; the rest of the party supported Poe's candidacy.)	3,510,080	10.88
Raul Roco	Aksyon Demokratiko	2,082,762	6.45
Eddie Villanueva	Bangon Pilipinas	1,988,218	6.16
Total		32,269,100	100.00
Valid votes		32,269,100	96.30
Invalid/blank votes		1,240,992	3.70
Total votes		33,510,092	100.00
Registered voters/turnout		43,895,324	76.34

Province/City	Arroyo		Poe		Lacson		Roco		Villanueva	
Province/City	Votes	%	Votes	%	Votes	%	Votes	%	Votes	%
Abra	32,644	32.40	50,866	50.48	11,256	11.17	2,251	2.23	3,741	3.71
Agusan del Norte	138,402	56.97	66,125	27.22	12,585	5.18	7,152	2.94	18,680	7.69
Agusan del Sur	100,998	52.02	61,949	31.91	10,905	5.62	4,643	2.39	15,649	8.06
Aklan	87,197	43.27	84,080	41.72	11,247	5.58	8,830	4.38	10,158	5.04
Albay	172,777	36.02	74,711	15.57	23,079	4.81	197,345	41.14	11,802	2.46
Antique	92,992	49.33	63,650	33.76	10,586	5.62	12,024	6.38	9,260	4.91
Apayao	15,018	38.73	15,789	40.71	4,195	10.82	787	2.03	2,992	7.72
Aurora	16,755	22.89	42,282	57.77	7,492	10.24	1,911	2.61	4,754	6.50
Bacolod	105,712	52.40	51,044	25.30	12,040	5.97	11,024	5.46	21,925	10.87
Baguio	32,546	34.30	17,809	18.77	23,928	25.22	8,017	8.45	12,577	13.26
Basilan	79,702	58.48	48,685	35.72	4,796	3.52	2,290	1.68	824	0.60
Bataan	65,955	22.35	171,070	57.97	28,646	9.71	12,447	4.22	16,970	5.75
Batanes	4,198	56.51	2,166	29.16	442	5.95	426	5.73	197	2.65
Batangas	264,007	29.46	377,915	42.17	141,122	15.75	46,520	5.19	66,540	7.43
Benguet	56,894	45.35	19,996	15.94	20,336	16.21	8,806	7.02	19,434	15.49
Biliran	27,865	43.98	27,133	42.83	2,909	4.59	1,771	2.80	3,675	5.80
Bohol	337,336	68.05	94,380	19.04	17,175	3.46	26,660	5.38	20,166	4.07
Bukidnon	191,409	47.28	149,987	37.05	24,333	6.01	11,107	2.74	28,003	6.92
Bulacan	237,080	22.60	505,164	48.15	131,759	12.56	69,139	6.59	106,065	10.11
Cagayan	142,653	36.86	166,209	42.95	49,141	12.70	11,065	2.86	17,953	4.64
Cagayan de Oro	62,133	35.48	77,778	44.41	13,013	7.43	8,077	4.61	14,139	8.07
Caloocan	86,016	23.10	151,281	40.63	69,774	18.74	30,998	8.33	34,275	9.21
Camarines Norte	46,641	26.69	70,566	40.38	13,240	7.58	37,846	21.66	6,462	3.70
Camarines Sur	117,427	19.93	89,080	15.12	16,894	2.87	351,868	59.71	13,979	2.37
Camiguin	21,760	52.46	15,093	36.39	1,959	4.72	1,058	2.55	1,606	3.87
Capiz	149,832	54.71	86,023	31.41	12,040	4.40	12,828	4.68	13,129	4.79
Catanduanes	17,358	17.64	39,342	39.99	4,657	4.73	32,635	33.17	4,399	4.47
Cavite	183,719	20.55	239,749	26.81	347,539	38.87	46,925	5.25	76,213	8.52
Cebu	965,630	79.88	123,099	10.18	46,056	3.81	42,213	3.49	31,812	2.63
Cebu City	220,060	67.16	58,591	17.88	22,055	6.73	15,251	4.65	11,715	3.58
Compostela Valley	94,867	44.34	80,544	37.65	17,673	8.26	5,911	2.76	14,935	6.98
Cotabato	131,749	32.59	171,950	42.53	72,417	17.91	9,115	2.25	19,037	4.71
Cotabato City	8,510	16.12	29,417	55.71	10,925	20.69	2,107	3.99	1,847	3.50
Davao City	193,880	40.09	192,074	39.72	49,400	10.22	18,434	3.81	29,803	6.16
Davao del Norte	131,537	41.00	133,018	41.46	32,253	10.05	8,391	2.62	15,658	4.88
Davao del Sur	115,728	37.26	154,144	49.62	20,667	6.65	7,037	2.27	13,055	4.20
Davao Oriental	82,098	47.94	67,006	39.13	7,607	4.44	3,964	2.31	10,581	6.18
Eastern Samar	75,049	45.24	73,439	44.27	6,377	3.84	3,779	2.28	7,232	4.36
Guimaras	44,987	74.29	6,528	10.78	2,215	3.66	4,011	6.62	2,814	4.65
Ifugao	29,404	42.49	13,941	20.14	10,023	14.48	2,283	3.30	13,558	19.59
Ilocos Norte	42,488	17.18	104,695	42.34	80,077	32.38	4,941	2.00	15,091	6.10
Ilocos Sur	140,736	50.02	76,040	27.03	41,524	14.76	10,493	3.73	12,570	4.47
Iloilo	512,812	73.20	82,244	11.74	34,470	4.92	44,229	6.31	26,773	3.82
Iloilo City	105,597	60.57	35,251	20.22	10,477	6.01	10,930	6.27	12,071	6.92
Isabela	153,791	29.81	250,988	48.64	74,992	14.53	12,491	2.42	23,712	4.60
Kalinga	33,261	41.95	18,461	23.28	12,688	16.00	3,110	3.92	11,769	14.84
La Union	56,902	18.66	169,415	55.57	53,595	17.58	9,771	3.20	15,194	4.98
Laguna	195,340	20.55	477,630	50.24	121,600	12.79	68,296	7.18	87,757	9.23
Lanao del Norte	130,485	41.48	137,597	43.74	25,308	8.05	8,667	2.76	12,520	3.98
Lanao del Sur	158,748	68.42	50,107	21.60	9,987	4.30	11,156	4.81	2,012	0.87
Las Piñas	60,117	31.68	58,241	30.69	34,080	17.96	16,856	8.88	20,474	10.79
Leyte	332,715	49.45	250,831	37.28	43,755	6.50	24,167	3.59	21,407	3.18
Maguindanao	199,431	69.40	63,313	22.03	15,199	5.29	7,222	2.51	2,183	0.76
Makati	65,750	27.01	81,306	33.40	51,194	21.03	19,133	7.86	26,035	10.70
Malabon–Navotas	43,952	20.68	106,919	50.31	33,474	15.75	11,999	5.65	16,178	7.61
Mandaluyong	34,163	28.56	42,116	35.21	21,428	17.91	9,165	7.66	12,746	10.66
Manila	186,704	26.82	269,114	38.66	140,039	20.12	38,960	5.60	61,214	8.79
Marikina	43,084	29.16	50,178	33.96	25,275	17.10	12,423	8.41	16,812	11.38
Marinduque	24,676	27.49	43,861	48.87	13,242	14.75	3,240	3.61	4,730	5.27
Masbate	112,711	44.74	94,741	37.60	6,139	2.44	25,452	10.10	12,896	5.12
Misamis Occidental	125,300	55.46	69,481	30.75	8,566	3.79	6,714	2.97	15,882	7.03
Misamis Oriental	111,401	33.71	180,123	54.51	13,276	4.02	8,695	2.63	16,944	5.13
Mountain Province	24,919	41.50	11,564	19.26	9,765	16.26	4,416	7.35	9,378	15.62
Muntinlupa	40,337	24.50	60,735	36.89	29,193	17.73	15,486	9.41	18,872	11.46
Negros Occidental	479,211	54.48	283,926	32.28	31,994	3.64	35,838	4.07	48,651	5.53
Negros Oriental	260,291	60.88	119,588	27.97	12,134	2.84	11,686	2.73	23,829	5.57
Northern Samar	57,306	28.95	122,485	61.88	7,837	3.96	3,490	1.76	6,807	3.44
Nueva Ecija	160,438	20.50	476,220	60.86	90,426	11.56	20,710	2.65	34,696	4.43
Nueva Vizcaya	40,721	27.08	57,151	38.01	35,670	23.72	4,726	3.14	12,103	8.05
Occidental Mindoro	34,267	24.10	78,668	55.33	15,670	11.02	4,302	3.03	9,270	6.52
Oriental Mindoro	81,691	31.04	124,258	47.21	26,188	9.95	9,075	3.45	21,987	8.35
Palawan	54,645	18.74	185,538	63.65	18,557	6.37	12,847	4.41	19,932	6.84
Pampanga	642,712	80.41	84,720	10.60	19,881	2.49	16,173	2.02	35,779	4.48
Pangasinan	445,230	41.29	487,463	45.21	62,397	5.79	30,770	2.85	52,474	4.87
Parañaque	53,549	29.69	54,417	30.17	35,366	19.61	17,493	9.70	19,531	10.83
Pasay	39,888	23.83	63,529	37.95	35,814	21.39	13,249	7.91	14,940	8.92
Pasig	61,385	25.26	91,432	37.63	41,527	17.09	22,629	9.31	26,012	10.71
Quezon	170,853	26.46	336,488	52.10	69,261	10.72	33,747	5.23	35,475	5.49
Quezon City	223,768	28.59	258,382	33.02	161,053	20.58	61,169	7.82	78,195	9.99
Quirino	21,185	35.03	24,574	40.63	6,746	11.15	1,896	3.14	6,077	10.05
Rizal	156,356	22.32	324,703	46.36	106,063	15.14	52,203	7.45	61,043	8.72
Romblon	41,562	38.35	45,909	42.36	8,649	7.98	2,611	2.41	9,645	8.90
Samar	84,754	30.48	167,974	60.41	11,441	4.11	4,909	1.77	8,967	3.23
San Juan	13,647	25.67	16,534	31.10	13,596	25.58	3,340	6.28	6,042	11.37
Sarangani	46,893	32.89	66,718	46.80	17,258	12.11	3,461	2.43	8,231	5.77
Siquijor	27,629	65.36	10,174	24.07	1,773	4.19	981	2.32	1,715	4.06
Sorsogon	73,724	26.69	97,040	35.14	10,277	3.72	87,025	31.51	8,119	2.94
South Cotabato	91,508	21.26	188,143	43.71	105,410	24.49	15,423	3.58	29,912	6.95
Southern Leyte	125,096	74.16	28,138	16.68	6,258	3.71	3,365	1.99	5,824	3.45
Sultan Kudarat	126,622	53.48	40,714	17.20	60,189	25.42	3,214	1.36	6,029	2.55
Sulu	78,429	53.48	60,807	41.46	5,095	3.47	1,903	1.30	418	0.29
Surigao del Norte	123,986	54.67	70,440	31.06	17,158	7.57	3,179	1.40	12,030	5.30
Surigao del Sur	114,075	53.17	68,192	31.79	10,481	4.89	4,863	2.27	16,924	7.89
Taguig–Pateros	53,445	25.87	74,672	36.15	41,065	19.88	18,700	9.05	18,696	9.05
Tarlac	210,171	45.24	166,248	35.79	40,833	8.79	17,847	3.84	29,461	6.34
Tawi-Tawi	33,634	38.43	49,803	56.90	2,379	2.72	1,383	1.58	321	0.37
Valenzuela	42,211	23.31	73,533	40.60	32,002	17.67	15,499	8.56	17,877	9.87
Zambales	75,085	26.43	146,974	51.73	34,540	12.16	12,846	4.52	14,669	5.16
Zamboanga City	61,705	24.77	142,236	57.09	29,422	11.81	7,472	3.00	8,311	3.34
Zamboanga del Norte	207,175	59.57	107,330	30.86	8,750	2.52	11,086	3.19	13,467	3.87
Zamboanga del Sur	203,122	60.60	96,556	28.81	9,654	2.88	5,632	1.68	20,213	6.03
Zamboanga Sibugay	65,836	36.13	95,677	52.51	3,913	2.15	2,707	1.49	14,077	7.73
Local absentee voters	4,164	71.47	421	7.23	988	16.96	151	2.59	102	1.75
Overseas absentee voters										
Total	12,905,808	39.99	11,782,232	36.51	3,510,080	10.88	2,082,762	6.45	1,988,218	6.19

== Vice presidential election ==
Candidate	Party	Votes	%
Noli de Castro (Note: Running mate of Gloria Macapagal Arroyo (Lakas–CMD))	Independent	15,100,431	49.80
Loren Legarda	Koalisyon ng Nagkakaisang Pilipino	14,218,709	46.89
Herminio Aquino	Aksyon Demokratiko	981,500	3.24
Rodolfo Pajo (Note: Running mate of Eddie Gil (Partido Isang Bansa, Isang Diwa) who was disqualified)	Partido Isang Bansa, Isang Diwa	22,244	0.07
Total		30,322,884	100.00
Valid votes		30,322,884	90.49
Invalid/blank votes		3,187,208	9.51
Total votes		33,510,092	100.00
Registered voters/turnout		43,895,324	76.34

Region	De Castro		Legarda		Aquino		Pajo	
Region	Votes	%	Votes	%	Votes	%	Votes	%
Abra	29,666	33.21	58,769	65.78	825	0.92	81	0.09
Agusan del Norte	168,486	73.16	59,346	25.77	2,256	0.98	204	0.09
Agusan del Sur	131,761	74.74	43,252	24.53	1,109	0.63	170	0.10
Aklan	90,840	47.71	98,162	51.56	1,350	0.71	33	0.02
Albay	244,345	55.82	158,517	36.21	34,718	7.93	136	0.03
Antique	56,069	30.92	123,780	68.26	1,444	0.80	42	0.02
Apayao	9,475	28.34	23,513	70.33	397	1.19	46	0.14
Aurora	21,282	29.61	49,756	69.23	789	1.10	42	0.06
Bacolod	130,273	66.64	52,874	27.05	12,194	6.24	140	0.07
Baguio	47,191	51.01	39,533	42.73	5,623	6.08	172	0.19
Basilan	27,945	22.16	97,380	77.21	649	0.51	156	0.12
Bataan	82,670	29.22	192,117	67.89	8,108	2.87	76	0.03
Batanes	3,849	55.83	2,970	43.08	65	0.94	10	0.15
Batangas	364,496	41.80	489,907	56.19	17,208	1.97	333	0.04
Benguet	74,995	63.24	38,342	32.33	5,030	4.24	212	0.18
Biliran	31,823	55.32	25,132	43.69	554	0.96	18	0.03
Bohol	349,434	76.42	101,734	22.25	5,848	1.28	246	0.05
Bukidnon	260,538	69.44	111,287	29.66	2,993	0.80	357	0.10
Bulacan	338,633	33.80	613,678	61.26	48,960	4.89	465	0.05
Cagayan	147,442	41.71	201,703	57.06	4,147	1.17	197	0.06
Cagayan de Oro	79,153	47.10	83,762	49.84	4,856	2.89	295	0.18
Caloocan	135,272	37.26	203,679	56.10	23,732	6.54	388	0.11
Camarines Norte	57,795	33.66	107,681	62.72	6,133	3.57	70	0.04
Camarines Sur	270,136	50.00	204,716	37.89	65,189	12.07	236	0.04
Camiguin	11,928	30.74	26,577	68.49	277	0.71	23	0.06
Capiz	160,577	61.66	97,251	37.34	2,580	0.99	26	0.01
Catanduanes	31,223	35.10	54,690	61.49	2,979	3.35	54	0.06
Cavite	360,999	42.89	438,223	52.07	41,712	4.96	695	0.08
Cebu	886,910	80.19	198,372	17.94	20,241	1.83	443	0.04
Cebu City	214,663	67.66	90,499	28.52	11,912	3.75	189	0.06
Compostela Valley	136,027	66.91	65,358	32.15	1,715	0.84	213	0.10
Cotabato	178,452	46.38	202,208	52.55	3,685	0.96	413	0.11
Cotabato City	15,859	30.75	34,620	67.13	1,064	2.06	27	0.05
Davao City	289,740	61.56	169,051	35.92	11,426	2.43	476	0.10
Davao del Norte	205,259	65.95	103,009	33.10	2,730	0.88	248	0.08
Davao del Sur	159,228	55.02	127,158	43.94	2,839	0.98	174	0.06
Davao Oriental	100,706	64.87	53,180	34.26	1,268	0.82	78	0.05
Eastern Samar	75,395	50.78	71,854	48.40	1,160	0.78	57	0.04
Guimaras	41,497	73.30	14,362	25.37	727	1.28	26	0.05
Ifugao	31,299	50.30	29,126	46.81	1,621	2.61	176	0.28
Ilocos Norte	69,747	29.64	163,602	69.53	1,861	0.79	99	0.04
Ilocos Sur	145,805	54.65	118,625	44.46	2,234	0.84	141	0.05
Iloilo	468,768	70.33	189,164	28.38	8,419	1.26	219	0.03
Iloilo City	104,644	61.58	58,728	34.56	6,475	3.81	76	0.04
Isabela	195,839	40.47	283,580	58.60	4,275	0.88	191	0.04
Kalinga	32,016	50.10	30,570	47.84	1,143	1.79	171	0.27
La Union	103,258	35.38	184,055	63.07	4,354	1.49	163	0.06
Laguna	285,097	31.26	587,117	64.37	39,406	4.32	534	0.06
Lanao del Norte	151,622	51.95	136,141	46.64	3,956	1.36	158	0.05
Lanao del Sur	66,705	37.13	105,602	58.78	5,326	2.96	2,029	1.13
Las Piñas	82,822	44.79	86,653	46.86	15,258	8.25	185	0.10
Leyte	355,896	58.92	240,492	39.81	7,384	1.22	284	0.05
Maguindanao	171,861	61.56	105,039	37.63	1,808	0.65	452	0.16
Makati	90,372	38.29	122,366	51.84	22,893	9.70	392	0.17
Malabon–Navotas	68,405	33.13	125,888	60.96	12,040	5.83	160	0.08
Mandaluyong	44,380	38.34	61,055	52.75	10,178	8.79	132	0.11
Manila	247,194	36.68	374,667	55.60	50,992	7.57	1,066	0.16
Marikina	56,057	39.12	72,588	50.65	14,492	10.11	174	0.12
Marinduque	37,847	44.56	46,265	54.47	796	0.94	22	0.03
Masbate	109,244	52.53	93,925	45.16	4,722	2.27	88	0.04
Misamis Occidental	137,437	65.91	69,337	33.25	1,636	0.78	97	0.05
Misamis Oriental	143,847	47.51	156,111	51.56	2,545	0.84	283	0.09
Mountain Province	25,379	47.38	26,268	49.04	1,815	3.39	105	0.20
Muntinlupa	63,330	39.78	85,003	53.39	10,766	6.76	98	0.06
Negros Occidental	520,836	63.78	283,923	34.77	11,644	1.43	250	0.03
Negros Oriental	246,219	66.49	118,012	31.87	5,806	1.57	263	0.07
Northern Samar	58,132	32.23	121,109	67.14	1,089	0.60	60	0.03
Nueva Ecija	202,858	26.92	538,094	71.40	12,497	1.66	159	0.02
Nueva Vizcaya	60,617	42.78	78,826	55.63	2,057	1.45	195	0.14
Occidental Mindoro	60,704	44.69	74,060	54.52	1,023	0.75	42	0.03
Oriental Mindoro	171,829	66.61	84,666	32.82	1,391	0.54	60	0.02
Palawan	67,172	25.64	192,085	73.31	2,631	1.00	127	0.05
Pampanga	572,448	74.16	179,725	23.28	19,455	2.52	241	0.03
Pangasinan	547,276	52.23	488,311	46.60	11,876	1.13	331	0.03
Parañaque	67,021	40.61	79,112	47.94	18,679	11.32	207	0.13
Pasay	61,662	38.02	89,115	54.95	11,156	6.88	252	0.16
Pasig	92,623	39.14	123,514	52.20	20,120	8.50	371	0.16
Quezon	210,285	33.83	399,529	64.27	11,620	1.87	212	0.03
Quezon City	303,056	39.93	380,795	50.17	74,232	9.78	908	0.12
Quirino	26,088	45.70	30,427	53.31	523	0.92	42	0.07
Rizal	251,729	37.10	389,204	57.35	37,203	5.48	458	0.07
Romblon	49,544	48.77	50,639	49.85	1,364	1.34	43	0.04
Samar	112,538	45.84	131,676	53.64	1,201	0.49	85	0.03
San Juan	17,812	34.77	27,084	52.88	6,230	12.16	95	0.19
Sarangani	67,685	52.15	61,038	47.03	985	0.76	73	0.06
Siquijor	27,689	72.28	10,389	27.12	217	0.57	15	0.04
Sorsogon	111,147	44.81	128,585	51.84	8,214	3.31	81	0.03
South Cotabato	197,019	47.43	212,334	51.12	5,817	1.40	223	0.05
Southern Leyte	120,251	75.80	37,252	23.48	984	0.62	156	0.10
Sultan Kudarat	79,534	35.70	139,767	62.73	3,120	1.40	388	0.17
Sulu	42,182	37.02	71,118	62.41	512	0.45	136	0.12
Surigao del Norte	133,098	65.31	69,277	34.00	1,315	0.65	90	0.04
Surigao del Sur	131,248	66.57	64,621	32.78	1,165	0.59	112	0.06
Taguig–Pateros	81,661	42.11	100,802	51.98	11,296	5.83	153	0.08
Tarlac	217,768	48.35	173,768	38.58	58,714	13.04	175	0.04
Tawi-Tawi	23,818	34.04	45,266	64.69	817	1.17	69	0.10
Valenzuela	67,897	38.52	97,764	55.47	10,488	5.95	107	0.06
Zambales	111,298	40.36	159,304	57.76	5,079	1.84	107	0.04
Zamboanga City	110,436	47.77	116,618	50.45	3,938	1.70	168	0.07
Zamboanga del Norte	187,702	65.32	95,050	33.08	4,396	1.53	221	0.08
Zamboanga del Sur	177,913	59.11	121,162	40.25	1,835	0.61	93	0.03
Zamboanga Sibugay	79,743	49.51	79,884	49.60	1,335	0.83	92	0.06
Local absentee voters	3,197	57.87	2,045	37.02	275	4.98	7	0.13
Overseas absentee voters								
Total	15,100,431	49.80	14,218,709	46.89	981,500	3.24	22,244	0.07
